= 1st Jammu and Kashmir Assembly (union territory) =

Legislature of Jammu and Kashmir, 2024–present

←	12th Jammu and Kashmir Assembly (state)

Overview
- Legislative body: Jammu and Kashmir Legislative Assembly
- Term: October 2024 – Present
- Election: 2024 Jammu and Kashmir Legislative Assembly election
- Government: Second Omar Abdullah ministry
- Members: 90 elected + 5 appointed
- Speaker: Abdul Rahim Rather
- Deputy Speaker: vacant
- Chief Minister: Omar Abdullah
- Deputy Chief Minister: Surinder Kumar Choudhary
- Leader of the Opposition: Sunil Kumar Sharma
- Deputy Leaders of the Opposition: Surjeet Singh Slathia, BJP; Pawan Kumar Gupta
- Party control: Jammu and Kashmir National Conference

The first Legislative Assembly of the union territory of Jammu and Kashmir was convened following the 2024 Jammu and Kashmir Legislative Assembly election held in September and October 2024.

== Office bearers ==
Office	Holder	Since
Speaker	Abdul Rahim Rather	4 November 2024
Leader of the House (Chief Minister)	Omar Abdullah	16 October 2024
Deputy Chief Minister	Surinder Kumar Choudhary	16 October 2024
Leader of the Opposition	Sunil Kumar Sharma	3 November 2024

== Membership by party ==
Membership by party in the 1st Jammu and Kashmir UT Assembly

The membership of the assembly by party is as follows:

Party	MLAs
Jammu & Kashmir National Conference	41
Bharatiya Janata Party	29
Indian National Congress	6
Jammu and Kashmir People's Democratic Party	4
Aam Aadmi Party	1
Communist Party of India (Marxist)	1
Jammu and Kashmir Awami Ittehad Party	1
Jammu and Kashmir People's Conference	1
Independent	6
Nominated	5
Total	95

== Members of Legislative Assembly (MLA) ==
The membership of the assembly is as follows:

District	Constituency		Name	Party	Remarks
District	No.	Name	Name	Party	Remarks
Kupwara	1	Karnah	Javaid Ahmad Mirchal	JKNC	
Kupwara	2	Trehgam	Saifullah Mir	JKNC	
Kupwara	3	Kupwara	Mir Mohammad Fayaz	JKPDP	
Kupwara	4	Lolab	Qaysar Jamshaid Lone	JKNC	
Kupwara	5	Handwara	Sajad Gani Lone	JKPC	
Kupwara	6	Langate	Khursheed Ahmed Sheikh	AIP	
Baramulla	7	Sopore	Irshad Rasool Kar	JKNC	
Baramulla	8	Rafiabad	Javid Ahmad Dar	JKNC	Cabinet Minister
Baramulla	9	Uri	Sajjad Safi	JKNC	
Baramulla	10	Baramulla	Javid Hassan Baig	JKNC	
Baramulla	11	Gulmarg	Pirzada Farooq Ahmed Shah	JKNC	
Baramulla	12	Wagoora–Kreeri	Irfan Hafiz Lone	INC	
Baramulla	13	Pattan	Javaid Riyaz	JKNC	
Bandipora	14	Sonawari	Hilal Akbar Lone	JKNC	
Bandipora	15	Bandipora	Nizam Uddin Bhat	INC	
Bandipora	16	Gurez (ST)	Nazir Ahmed Khan	JKNC	
Ganderbal	17	Kangan (ST)	Mian Mehar Ali	JKNC	
Ganderbal	18	Ganderbal	Omar Abdullah	JKNC	Chief Minister
Srinagar	19	Hazratbal	Salman Sagar	JKNC	
Srinagar	20	Khanyar	Ali Mohammad Sagar	JKNC	
Srinagar	21	Habba Kadal	Shamim Firdous	JKNC	
Srinagar	22	Lal Chowk	Sheikh Ahsan Ahmed	JKNC	
Srinagar	23	Chanapora	Mushtaq Guroo	JKNC	
Srinagar	24	Zadibal	Tanvir Sadiq	JKNC	
Srinagar	25	Eidgah	Mubarik Gul	JKNC	
Srinagar	26	Central Shalteng	Tariq Hameed Karra	INC	
Budgam	27	Budgam	Omar Abdullah	JKNC	Resigned on 21 October 2024
Budgam	27	Budgam	Aga Syed Muntazir Mehdi	JKPDP	Elected in by-election
Budgam	28	Beerwah	Shafi Ahmad Wani	JKNC	
Budgam	29	Khan Sahib	Saif Ud Din Bhat	JKNC	
Budgam	30	Charari Sharief	Abdul Rahim Rather	JKNC	Speaker
Budgam	31	Chadoora	Ali Mohammad Dar	JKNC	
Pulwama	32	Pampore	Hasnain Masoodi	JKNC	
Pulwama	33	Tral	Rafiq Ahmad Naik	JKPDP	
Pulwama	34	Pulwama	Waheed Ur Rehman Para	JKPDP	
Pulwama	35	Rajpora	Ghulam Mohit Uddin Mir	JKNC	
Shopian	36	Zainapora	Showkat Hussain	JKNC	
Shopian	37	Shopian	Shabir Ahmad Kullay	IND	
Kulgam	38	DH Pora	Sakina Itoo	JKNC	Cabinet Minister
Kulgam	39	Kulgam	Mohammad Yusuf Tarigami	CPI(M)	
Kulgam	40	Devsar	Peerzada Feroze Ahamad	JKNC	
Anantnag	41	Dooru	Gulam Ahmad Mir	INC	
Anantnag	42	Kokernag (ST)	Zafar Ali Khatana	JKNC	
Anantnag	43	Anantnag West	Abdul Majeed Bhat	JKNC	
Anantnag	44	Anantnag	Peerzada Mohammad Syed	INC	
Anantnag	45	Srigufwara–Bijbehara	Bashir Ahmed Shah Veeri	JKNC	
Anantnag	46	Shangus–Anantnag East	Reyaz Ahmad Khan	JKNC	
Anantnag	47	Pahalgam	Altaf Ahmad Wani	JKNC	
Kishtwar	48	Inderwal	Payare Lal Sharma	IND	Supports JKNC
Kishtwar	49	Kishtwar	Shagun Parihar	BJP	
Kishtwar	50	Padder–Nagseni	Sunil Kumar Sharma	BJP	Leader of Opposition
Doda	51	Bhadarwah	Daleep Singh	BJP	
Doda	52	Doda	Mehraj Malik	AAP	
Doda	53	Doda West	Shakti Raj Parihar	BJP	
Ramban	54	Ramban	Arjun Singh Raju	JKNC	
Ramban	55	Banihal	Sajad Shaheen	JKNC	
Reasi	56	Gulabgarh (ST)	Khurshied Ahmed	JKNC	
Reasi	57	Reasi	Kuldeep Raj Dubey	BJP	
Reasi	58	Shri Mata Vaishno Devi	Baldev Raj Sharma	BJP	
Udhampur	59	Udhampur West	Pawan Kumar Gupta	BJP	
Udhampur	60	Udhampur East	Ranbir Singh Pathania	BJP	
Udhampur	61	Chenani	Balwant Singh Mankotia	BJP	
Udhampur	62	Ramnagar (SC)	Sunil Bhardwaj	BJP	
Kathua	63	Bani	Rameshwar Singh Thakur	IND	Supports JKNC
Kathua	64	Billawar	Satish Kumar Sharma	BJP	
Kathua	65	Basohli	Thakur Darshan Singh	BJP	
Kathua	66	Jasrota	Rajiv Jasrotia	BJP	
Kathua	67	Kathua (SC)	Bharat Bhushan	BJP	
Kathua	68	Hiranagar	Vijay Kumar Sharma	BJP	
Samba	69	Ramgarh (SC)	Devinder Kumar Manyal	BJP	
Samba	70	Samba	Surjeet Singh Slathia	BJP	
Samba	71	Vijaypur	Chander Prakash Ganga	BJP	
Jammu	72	Bishnah (SC)	Rajeev Kumar	BJP	
Jammu	73	Suchetgarh (SC)	Gharu Ram Bhagat	BJP	
Jammu	74	RS Pora–Jammu South	Narinder Singh Raina	BJP	
Jammu	75	Bahu	Vikram Randhawa	BJP	
Jammu	76	Jammu East	Yudhvir Sethi	BJP	
Jammu	77	Nagrota	Devender Singh Rana	BJP	Died on 31 October 2024
Jammu	77	Nagrota	Devyani Singh Rana	BJP	Elected in by-election
Jammu	78	Jammu West	Arvind Gupta	BJP	
Jammu	79	Jammu North	Sham Lal Sharma	BJP	
Jammu	80	Marh (SC)	Surinder Kumar	BJP	
Jammu	81	Akhnoor (SC)	Mohan Lal	BJP	
Jammu	82	Chhamb	Satish Sharma	IND	Supports JKNC; Cabinet Minister
Rajouri	83	Kalakote–Sunderbani	Randhir Singh	BJP	
Rajouri	84	Nowshera	Surinder Choudhary	JKNC	Deputy Chief Minister
Rajouri	85	Rajouri (ST)	Iftkar Ahmed	INC	
Rajouri	86	Budhal (ST)	Javaid Iqbal	JKNC	
Rajouri	87	Thanamandi (ST)	Muzaffar Iqbal Khan	IND	
Poonch	88	Surankote (ST)	Choudhary Mohammed Akram	IND	Supports JKNC
Poonch	89	Poonch Haveli	Ajaz Ahmed Jan	JKNC	
Poonch	90	Mendhar (ST)	Javed Ahmed Rana	JKNC	Cabinet Minister
