= 2024 Jammu and Kashmir Legislative Assembly election =

Assembly elections in India

- 18 September – 1 October 2024

90 seats (Note: There are 119 seats in Jammu and Kashmir Legislative Assembly. Elections are not conducted in 24 seats that fall under Azad Jammu and Kashmir. 5 more seats are additionally nominated by Lieutenant Governor of the union territory.) in the Jammu and Kashmir Legislative Assembly 48 seats needed for a majority
- Opinion polls
- Turnout: 64.28% (▼1.63pp)
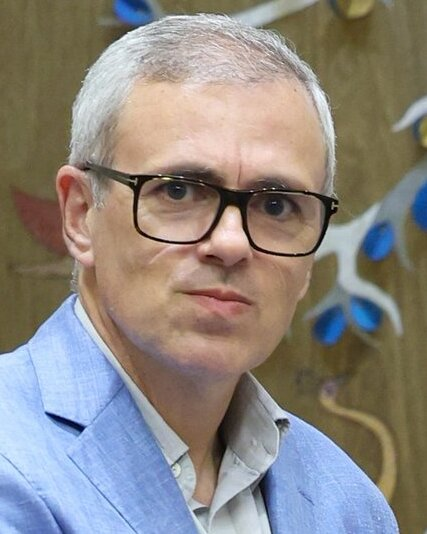

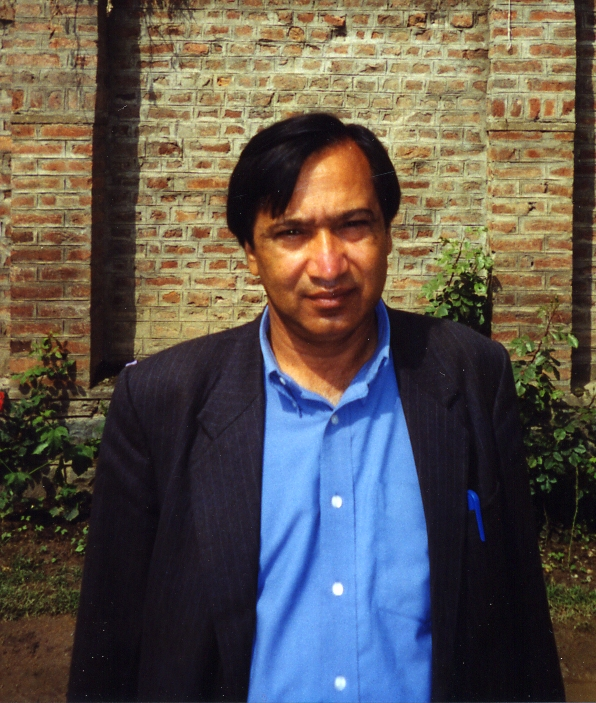
	Majority party	Minority party	Third party
Leader	Omar Abdullah	Ravinder Raina	Tariq Hameed Karra
Party	JKNC	BJP	INC
Alliance	INDIA	NDA	INDIA
Leader since	2009	2018	2024
Leader's seat	Ganderbal (won, retained); Budgam (won, vacated)	Nowshera (lost)	Central Shalteng (won)
Last election	20.77%, 15 seats	22.98%, 25 seats	18.01%, 12 seats
Seats won	42	29	6
Seat change	▲27	▲4	▼6
Popular vote	1,336,147	1,462,225	682,666
Percentage	23.43%	25.64%	11.97%
Swing	▲2.66pp	▲2.66pp	▼6.04pp
	Fourth party	Fifth party	Sixth party
		JKPC
Leader	Mehbooba Mufti	Sajjad Gani Lone	Mohammed Yousuf Tarigami
Party	JKPDP	JKPC	CPI(M)
Alliance	Steady	Steady	INDIA
Leader since	2016	2015	1996
Leader's seat	Did not contest	Handwara (won)	Kulgam (won)
Last election	22.67%, 28 seats	1.93%, 2 seats	0.5%, 1 seat
Seats won	3	1	1
Seat change	▼25	▼1	Steady
Popular vote	505,498	141,692	33,634
Percentage	8.87%	2.5%	0.59%
Swing	▼13.8pp	▲0.57pp	▲0.09pp

- Structure of the Jammu and Kashmir Legislative Assembly after the election
Chief Minister before election
President's rule
Elected Chief Minister
Omar Abdullah
JKNC

Legislative Assembly elections were held in Jammu and Kashmir from 18 September to 1 October 2024 in 3 phases to elect 90 members of Jammu and Kashmir Legislative Assembly. The results of the elections were announced on 8 October 2024. The INDIA alliance (Note: Consisting the Jammu and Kashmir National Conference (JKNC), the Indian National Congress (INC), the Communist Party of India (Marxist) (CPI(M)), and the Jammu and Kashmir National Panthers Party (JKNPP),) won a majority of seats in the election, winning 49 of the 90 seats for which elections were held, with the Jammu and Kashmir National Conference (JKNC) winning the highest number of seats. The Bharatiya Janata Party (BJP) won the second largest number of seats and the largest share of the popular vote.

This was the first assembly election in over a decade, and the first since the territory's special status was revoked, its statehood withdrawn, martial curfew imposed and over 300 political leaders detained or under house arrest in 2019. The Indian government indefinitely suspended elections in order to stabilise the conditions in Kashmir Valley due to the decades long and ongoing armed insurgency in Jammu and Kashmir. A Supreme Court plea challenging this was brought forward by Panthers Party in May 2023. In December 2023, the Supreme Court directed the Election Commission of India to restore the democratic process by 30 September 2024. The order also upheld the revocation of article 370 and deemed it to be within the laws set by the constitution. Foreign diplomats were allowed to observe the election but foreign journalists were kept out.

JKNC emerged as the single largest party, winning 42 seats in total, while BJP came second with 29 seats won. The Indian National Congress (INC) won 6 seats, Jammu and Kashmir People’s Democratic Party (JKPDP) won 3 seats, while Communist Party of India (Marxist) (CPI(M)), Jammu and Kashmir People's Conference and Aam Aadmi Party won one seat each. 7 seats were won by independent candidates. After BJP's 25.64% largest share of the popular vote, JKNC won the second largest share at 23.43%. The INC and JKPDP got 11.97% and 8.87% of the votes respectively, with remaining 30.09% going to other parties, independents and NOTA (none of the above). Coincidentally, this was the worst performance of the Indian National Congress, winning just 6 out of the 38 seats it contested and garnering a vote share of 11.97%. The JKNC's Omar Abdullah was sworn in as the union territory's first chief minister on 16 October.

== Background ==
The previous assembly elections were held in November–December 2014. After the election, coalition of Jammu and Kashmir Peoples Democratic Party and Bharatiya Janata Party formed the state government, with Mufti Mohammad Sayeed becoming the Chief Minister.

Chief Minister Mufti Mohammad Sayeed died on 7 January 2016. After a brief period of Governor's rule, Mehbooba Mufti was sworn in as the next Chief Minister of Jammu and Kashmir.

=== Political developments ===
==== Dissolution of assembly and President's rule ====
In June 2018, BJP withdrew its support to the PDP-led government and Governor's rule was subsequently imposed in Jammu and Kashmir. In November 2018, the state assembly was dissolved by Governor of Jammu and Kashmir Satya Pal Malik. despite the fact that many political parties had written to the Governor expressing their willingness to form the Government. President's rule was imposed on 20 December 2018.

==== Revocation of Article 370 and reorganisation of state ====
In 2019, Article 370 of the Constitution of India, which gave special status to the disputed Jammu and Kashmir, was abrogated and the Jammu and Kashmir Reorganisation Act was passed to reconstitute the state of Jammu and Kashmir into union territory of Jammu and Kashmir and Ladakh with effect from 31 October 2019. The changes allowed Hindu refugees residing in Jammu who were displaced from Pakistan following Partition in 1947 to vote in assembly elections.

==== Delimitation ====
In March 2020, a three-member Delimitation Commission was formed, chaired by retired Justice Ranjana Prakash Desai, for the delimitation of the union territory of Jammu and Kashmir. The commission published its interim report in February 2022. The final delimitation report was released on 5 May 2022 under which additional 6 seats were added to Jammu division and 1 seat to Kashmir division. After delimitation, the total seats in the assembly rose to 114 seats, out of which 24 seats are designated for areas that fall under Pakistan-administered Kashmir. Out of the remaining 90 seats, 43 seats are in Jammu division and 47 seats are in the Kashmir division. The final delimitation report came into force from 20 May 2022.

==== DDC elections ====
In 2020, DDC elections were held after revocation of special status. People's Alliance for Gupkar Declaration (PAGD) secured 110 seats, while BJP was the single largest party with 75 seats.

==== Supreme Court verdict on abrogation on Article 370 ====
On 11 December 2023, the Supreme Court in its verdict upheld the abrogation of article 370 as constitutional and ordered the Election Commission of India to hold legislative assembly elections in Indian-administered Jammu and Kashmir before 30 September 2024.

==== Reservation for SC/STs ====
The parliament passed the Jammu and Kashmir Reorganisation (Amendment) Bill 2023 which provides for reservation of 7 seats for the Scheduled Castes and 9 seats for the Scheduled Tribes.

==== Jammu and Kashmir lithium reserves ====
On 2 May 2024, Ministry of Mines secretary Vivek Bharadwaj announced that an auction to assign mining rights was planned on priority basis by December 2024. Former minister and JKNPP president Harsh Dev Singh, challenged the legal premise, upon which the federal government planned to assign mineral rights valued at US$500 billion (half a trillion dollars). On 29 May 2023, Harsh Dev, stated that in accordance to Mines and Minerals (Development and Regulation) Act 1957, only a federated state or union territory government had the lawful right to hold auctions and assign mining concessions for minerals found on land. In December 2023, the first attempt to auction Jammu and Kashmir lithium failed. As the auction only received two bids, as per legislation a minimum of three bids is required for the auction to be considered valid. In July 2024 a second attempt by the central Indian government of auction Jammu and Kashmir's lithium failed to receive any bids.

== Schedule ==
The schedule of the election was announced by the Election Commission of India on 16 August 2024. The date of counting of votes was postponed from 4 to 8 October.

Phase wise schedule of 2024 Jammu and Kashmir Legislative Assembly election Phase I Phase II Phase III

Poll event	Phase		
Poll event	I	II	III
Notification date	20 August	29 August	5 September
Last date for filing nomination	27 August	5 September	12 September
Scrutiny of nomination	28 August	6 September	13 September
Last date for withdrawal of nomination	30 August	9 September	17 September
Date of poll	18 September	25 September	1 October
Date of counting of votes	8 October 2024		
No. of constituencies	24	26	40

== Parties and alliances ==
=== Indian National Developmental Inclusive Alliance ===
Indian National Developmental Inclusive Alliance

Alliance between Jammu & Kashmir National Conference, Indian National Congress and Communist Party of India (Marxist) was announced on 22 August 2024. The seat sharing was finalized on 26 August 2024 with friendly contest on 6 seats between alliance partners.

Party	Flag	Symbol	Leader	Seats contesting
Jammu and Kashmir National Conference			Farooq Abdullah	56 (Note: JKNC and INC had friendly contests in 6 seats.)
Indian National Congress			Tariq Hameed Karra	38
Communist Party of India (Marxist)			Mohammed Yousuf Tarigami	1

=== National Democratic Alliance ===
National Democratic Alliance

Party	Flag	Symbol	Leader	Seats contesting
Bharatiya Janata Party			Ravinder Raina	62

=== Jammu and Kashmir People's Democratic Party ===

Party	Flag	Symbol	Leader	Seats contesting
Jammu and Kashmir People's Democratic Party		Ink-pot & Pen	Mehbooba Mufti	81

=== Others ===
Party	Flag	Symbol	Leader	Seats contested
Jammu and Kashmir Apni Party			Altaf Bukhari	46
Jammu and Kashmir Awami Ittehad Party			Engineer Rashid	44 (Note: In some places in alliance with Jamaat-e-Islami Kashmir.)
Bahujan Samaj Party			Darshan Rana	27
Democratic Progressive Azad Party			Ghulam Nabi Azad	23
Jammu and Kashmir People's Conference			Sajjad Gani Lone	15
Aam Aadmi Party			Mehraj Malik	7
Jammu and Kashmir National Panthers Party			Harsh Dev Singh	4 (Note: One seat contested by JKNPP was supported by INDIA bloc.)
Jamaat-e-Islami Jammu and Kashmir (Note: Jamaat-e-Islami Kashmir was banned in 2019, but fielded candidates on 4 seats as independents and extended support to a further 4.)			Ghulam Qadir Wani	4
Jammu and Kashmir People's Movement			Mohammed Hussain Padder	
Jammu and Kashmir Awami National Conference			Khalida Begum	

== Candidates ==
JKNC released the first list of 18 candidates on 26 August; the second list of 32 candidates on 27 August; the third list of four candidates on 8 September.

INC released the first list of 9 candidates on 26 August; the second list of 6 candidates on 2 September; the third list of 19 candidates on 9 September.

BJP released the first list of 15 candidates and the second list of one candidate on 26 August; the third list of 29 candidates on 27 August; the fourth list of 6 candidates on 2 September. BJP released sixth list of 10 candidates on 8 September.

JKPDP announced 25 candidates on 26 August; 17 candidates on 28 August; 4 candidates on 29 August; 8 candidates on 30 August; 6 candidates on 1 September; 2 candidates on 3 September; 1 candidate on 6 September.

Voting date	District	Constituency							
Voting date	District	Constituency		INDIA		BJP		JKPDP	
1 October 2024	Kupwara	1	Karnah	JKNC	Javid Mirchal	BJP	Mohammad Idrees Karnahi	JKPDP	Firdous Ahmed Mir
1 October 2024	Kupwara	2	Trehgam	JKNC	Mir Saifullah			JKPDP	Mohammad Afzal Wani
1 October 2024	Kupwara	3	Kupwara	JKNC	Nasir Aslam Wani			JKPDP	Fayaz Ahmad Mir
1 October 2024	Kupwara	4	Lolab	JKNC	Qaiser Jamsheed Lone			JKPDP	Abdul Haq Khan
1 October 2024	Kupwara	5	Handwara	JKNC	Chowdary Mohammad Ramzan	BJP	Ghulam Mohammad Mir	JKPDP	Mir Azad Parwaz
1 October 2024	Kupwara	6	Langate	INC	Irshad Ab Gani			JKPDP	Syed Gh Nabi Bukhari
1 October 2024	Baramulla	7	Sopore	JKNC	Irshad Rasool Kar			JKPDP	Irfan Ali Lone
1 October 2024	Baramulla	7	Sopore	INC	Haji Abdul Rashid Dar			JKPDP	Irfan Ali Lone
1 October 2024	Baramulla	8	Rafiabad	JKNC	Javid Ahmed Dar			JKPDP	Altaf Ahmed Malik
1 October 2024	Baramulla	9	Uri	JKNC	Shahzad Shafi				
1 October 2024	Baramulla	10	Baramulla	JKNC	Javid Hassan Baig			JKPDP	Mohammad Rafique Rather
1 October 2024	Baramulla	10	Baramulla	INC	Mir Iqbal			JKPDP	Mohammad Rafique Rather
1 October 2024	Baramulla	11	Gulmarg	JKNC	Farooq Ahmad Shah				
1 October 2024	Baramulla	12	Wagoora–Kreeri	INC	Irfan Hafeez Lone			JKPDP	Syed Basharat Ahmed Bukhari
1 October 2024	Baramulla	13	Pattan	JKNC	Javid Reyaz Bedar			JKPDP	Javaid Iqbal Ganaie
1 October 2024	Bandipora	14	Sonawari	JKNC	Hilal Akbar Lone	BJP	Abdul Rashid Khan	JKPDP	Tahir Qadri
1 October 2024	Bandipora	15	Bandipora	INC	Nizamuddin Bhat	BJP	Nasir Ahmad Lone	JKPDP	Syed Tajamul Islam
1 October 2024	Bandipora	16	Gurez (ST)	JKNC	Nazir Ahmad Gurezi	BJP	Fakir Mohammad Khan		
25 September 2024	Ganderbal	17	Kangan (ST)	JKNC	Mian Mehar Ali			JKPDP	Syed Jamaat Ali Shaheen
25 September 2024	Ganderbal	18	Ganderbal	JKNC	Omar Abdullah			JKPDP	Bashir Ahmed Mir
25 September 2024	Srinagar	19	Hazratbal	JKNC	Salman Ali Sagar			JKPDP	Asiea Naqash
25 September 2024	Srinagar	20	Khanyar	JKNC	Ali Mohammad Sagar			JKPDP	Tafazul Mushtaq
25 September 2024	Srinagar	21	Habba Kadal	JKNC	Shamim Firdous	BJP	Ashok Bhat	JKPDP	Arif Laigroo
25 September 2024	Srinagar	22	Lal Chowk	JKNC	Ahsan Pardesi	BJP	Er. Aijaz Hussain	JKPDP	Zuhaib Yousf Mir
25 September 2024	Srinagar	23	Chanapora	JKNC	Mushtaq Guroo	BJP	Hilal Ahmad Wani	JKPDP	Mohammad Iqbal Trumboo
25 September 2024	Srinagar	24	Zadibal	JKNC	Tanvir Sadiq			JKPDP	Sheikh Gowher Ali
25 September 2024	Srinagar	25	Eidgah	JKNC	Mubarak Gul	BJP	Arif Raja	JKPDP	Mohammad Khursheed Alam
25 September 2024	Srinagar	26	Central Shalteng	INC	Tariq Hameed Karra				
25 September 2024	Budgam	27	Budgam	JKNC	Omar Abdullah			JKPDP	Aga. Syed Munatzir Mehdi
25 September 2024	Budgam	28	Beerwah	JKNC	Mohammed Shafi Wani			JKPDP	Haji Gh Ahmed Khan
25 September 2024	Budgam	29	Khan Sahib	JKNC	Saif-Ud-Din Bhat	BJP	Ali Mohammad Mir	JKPDP	Manzoor Ahmed Wani
25 September 2024	Budgam	30	Charar-i-Sharif	JKNC	Abdul Rahim Rather	BJP	Zahid Hussain	JKPDP	Ghulam Nabi Lone
25 September 2024	Budgam	31	Chadoora	JKNC	Ali Mohammad Dar				
18 September 2024	Pulwama	32	Pampore	JKNC	Hasnain Masoodi	BJP	Syed Showkat Gayoor Andrabi	JKPDP	Waheed-ur Rehman Parra
18 September 2024	Pulwama	33	Tral	INC	Surinder Singh Channi			JKPDP	Rafiq Ahmed Naik
18 September 2024	Pulwama	34	Pulwama	JKNC	Mohammad Khalil Bandh			JKPDP	Waheed Para
18 September 2024	Pulwama	35	Rajpora	JKNC	Ghulam Mohi-Ud-Din Mir	BJP	Arshid Bhat	JKPDP	Syed Bashir Ahmed
18 September 2024	Shopian	36	Zainapora	JKNC	Showkat Hussain Ganie				
18 September 2024	Shopian	37	Shopian	JKNC	Sheikh Mohammad Rafi	BJP	Javed Ahmad Qadri	JKPDP	Yawar Bandey
18 September 2024	Kulgam	38	D. H. Pora	JKNC	Sakina Itoo				
18 September 2024	Kulgam	39	Kulgam	CPI(M)	Mohammed Yousuf Tarigami			JKPDP	Mohd Amin Dar
18 September 2024	Kulgam	40	Devsar	JKNC	Peerzada Feroze Ahmad			JKPDP	Sartaj Ahmed Madani
18 September 2024	Kulgam	40	Devsar	INC	Amanullah Mantoo			JKPDP	Sartaj Ahmed Madani
18 September 2024	Anantnag	41	Dooru	INC	Ghulam Ahmad Mir			JKPDP	Mohd Ashraf Malik
18 September 2024	Anantnag	42	Kokernag (ST)	JKNC	Chowdary Zaffer Ahmad	BJP	Roshan Hussain Gujjar	JKPDP	Haroon Rashid Khatana
18 September 2024	Anantnag	43	Anantnag West	JKNC	Abdul Majeed Larmi	BJP	Mohammad Rafiq Wani	JKPDP	Abdul Gaffar Sofi
18 September 2024	Anantnag	44	Anantnag	INC	Peerzada Mohammad Syed	BJP	Syed Wajahat	JKPDP	Mehboob Baig
18 September 2024	Anantnag	45	Srigufwara–Bijbehara	JKNC	Bashir Ahmad Veeri	BJP	Sofi Yousuf	JKPDP	Iltija Mufti
18 September 2024	Anantnag	46	Shangus–Anantnag East	JKNC	Reyaz Ahmad Khan	BJP	Veer Saraf	JKPDP	Abdul Rehman Veeri
18 September 2024	Anantnag	47	Pahalgam	JKNC	Altaf Ahmad Kaloo				
18 September 2024	Kishtwar	48	Inderwal	INC	Sheikh Zafarullah	BJP	Tariq Hussain Keen	JKPDP	Nasir Hussain Sheikh
18 September 2024	Kishtwar	49	Kishtwar	JKNC	Sajad Kichloo	BJP	Shagun Parihar	JKPDP	Firdous Ahmad Tak
18 September 2024	Kishtwar	50	Padder–Nagseni	JKNC	Pooja Thakur	BJP	Sunil Kumar Sharma		
18 September 2024	Doda	51	Bhadarwah	JKNC	Mehboob Iqbal	BJP	Daleep Singh Parihar		
18 September 2024	Doda	51	Bhadarwah	INC	Nadeem Sharief	BJP	Daleep Singh Parihar		
18 September 2024	Doda	52	Doda	JKNC	Khalid Najeeb Soharwardy	BJP	Gajay Singh Rana	JKPDP	Mansoor Ahmed Bhat
18 September 2024	Doda	52	Doda	INC	Sheikh Riyaz	BJP	Gajay Singh Rana	JKPDP	Mansoor Ahmed Bhat
18 September 2024	Doda	53	Doda West	INC	Pradeep Kumar Bhagat	BJP	Shakti Raj Parihar		
18 September 2024	Ramban	54	Ramban	JKNC	Arjun Singh Raju	BJP	Rakesh Singh Thakur		
18 September 2024	Ramban	55	Banihal	JKNC	Sajad Shaheen	BJP	Salim Bhat		
18 September 2024	Ramban	55	Banihal	INC	Vikar Rasool Wani	BJP	Salim Bhat		
25 September 2024	Reasi	56	Gulabgarh (ST)	JKNC	Engineer Khursheed	BJP	Mohammad Akram Chaudhary	JKPDP	Farooq Inqilabi
25 September 2024	Reasi	57	Reasi	INC	Mumtaz Khan	BJP	Kuldeep Raj Dubey	JKPDP	Bodh Raj Meania
25 September 2024	Reasi	58	Shri Mata Vaishno Devi	INC	Bhupender Jamwal	BJP	Baldev Raj Sharma	JKPDP	Pratap Krishan Sharma
1 October 2024	Udhampur	59	Udhampur West	INC	Summit Mangotra	BJP	Pawan Kumar Gupta		
1 October 2024	Udhampur	60	Udhampur East	JKNC	Sunil Verma	BJP	Ranbir Singh Pathania		
1 October 2024	Udhampur	61	Chenani	JKNPP(I)	Harsh Dev Singh	BJP	Balwant Singh Mankotia		
1 October 2024	Udhampur	62	Ramnagar (SC)	INC	Mool Raj	BJP	Sunil Bhardwaj		
1 October 2024	Kathua	63	Bani	INC	Kajal Rajput	BJP	Jeevan Lal	JKPDP	Romesh Chandar Verma
1 October 2024	Kathua	64	Billawar	INC	Manohar Lal Sharma	BJP	Satish Sharma	JKPDP	Akhter Ali
1 October 2024	Kathua	65	Basohli	INC	Chaudhary Lal Singh	BJP	Darshan Singh	JKPDP	Joginder Singh
1 October 2024	Kathua	66	Jasrota	INC	Thakur Balbir Singh	BJP	Rajiv Jasrotia		
1 October 2024	Kathua	67	Kathua (SC)	JKNC	Subash Chander Azad	BJP	Bharat Bhushan		
1 October 2024	Kathua	68	Hiranagar	INC	Rakesh Choudhary Jatt	BJP	Vijay Kumar Sharma	JKPDP	Vishal Salgotra
1 October 2024	Samba	69	Ramgarh (SC)	INC	Yash Paul Kundal	BJP	Devinder Kumar Manyal		
1 October 2024	Samba	70	Samba	INC	Krishan Dev Singh	BJP	Surjit Singh Slathia	JKPDP	Rajender Manhas
1 October 2024	Samba	71	Vijaypur	JKNC	Rajesh Pargotra	BJP	Chander Prakash Ganga	JKPDP	Bachan Lal
1 October 2024	Jammu	72	Bishnah (SC)	INC	Neeraj Kundan	BJP	Rajeev Bhagat		
1 October 2024	Jammu	73	Suchetgarh (SC)	INC	Bhushan Dogra	BJP	Gharu Ram Bhagat		
1 October 2024	Jammu	74	R. S. Pura–Jammu South	INC	Raman Bhalla	BJP	Narinder Singh Raina	JKPDP	Narendra Shamra
1 October 2024	Jammu	75	Bahu	INC	T.S. Tony	BJP	Vikram Randhawa	JKPDP	Verinder Singh Sonu
1 October 2024	Jammu	76	Jammu East	INC	Yogesh Sawhney	BJP	Yudhvir Sethi	JKPDP	Aditya Gupta
1 October 2024	Jammu	77	Nagrota	JKNC	Joginder Singh	BJP	Devender Singh Rana		
1 October 2024	Jammu	77	Nagrota	INC	Balbir Singh	BJP	Devender Singh Rana		
1 October 2024	Jammu	78	Jammu West	INC	Thakur Manmohan Singh	BJP	Arvind Gupta	JKPDP	Rajat Gupta
1 October 2024	Jammu	79	Jammu North	JKNC	Ajay Kumar Sadhotra	BJP	Sham Lal Sharma	JKPDP	Darshan Mangotra
1 October 2024	Jammu	80	Marh (SC)	INC	Mula Ram	BJP	Surinder Bhagat		
1 October 2024	Jammu	81	Akhnoor (SC)	INC	Ashok Bhagat	BJP	Mohan Lal Bhagat		
1 October 2024	Jammu	82	Chhamb	INC	Tara Chand	BJP	Rajeev Sharma		
25 September 2024	Rajouri	83	Kalakote–Sunderbani	JKNC	Yashu Vardhan Singh	BJP	Thakur Randhir Singh	JKPDP	Syed Majid Shah
25 September 2024	Rajouri	84	Nowshera	JKNC	Surinder Chowdary	BJP	Ravinder Raina	JKPDP	Haq Nawaz
25 September 2024	Rajouri	85	Rajouri (ST)	INC	Iftkar Ahmed	BJP	Vibodh Gupta	JKPDP	Tasaduq Hussain
25 September 2024	Rajouri	86	Budhal (ST)	JKNC	Javid Chowdary	BJP	Chowdary Zulfikar Ali	JKPDP	Guftar Ahmed Choudhary
25 September 2024	Rajouri	87	Thannamandi (ST)	INC	Shabir Ahmad Khan	BJP	Mohammad Iqbal Malik	JKPDP	Qamar Hussain Choudhary
25 September 2024	Poonch	88	Surankote (ST)	INC	Mohd Shahnawaz Choudhary	BJP	Syed Mushtaq Ahmad Bukhari	JKPDP	Javid Choudhary
25 September 2024	Poonch	89	Poonch Haveli	JKNC	Ajaz Ahmad Jan	BJP	Chowdary Abdul Ghani	JKPDP	Shamim Ganai
25 September 2024	Poonch	90	Mendhar (ST)	JKNC	Javed Rana	BJP	Murtaza Khan	JKPDP	Mahroof Khan

== Observers ==
Diplomats from 16 countries, including the United States and Russia, observed the voting in Srinagar.

== Voter turnout ==
Phase	Date	Seats	Turnout (%)
I	18 September	24	61.38
II	25 September	26	57.31
III	1 October	40	69.69
Total		90	63.88

== Surveys and polls ==
=== Exit polls ===
Exit polls were released on 5 October 2024.

Polling agency					Lead
Polling agency	INDIA	BJP	JKPDP	Others	Lead
India Today – CVoter	40-48	27-32	6-12	6-11	0-13
South First – People's Pulse	46-50	23-27	7-11	4-06	0-17
Axis My India	35-45	24-34	4-6	8-23	Hung
Gulistan News	31-36	28-30	5-7	6-16	Hung
Poll of Polls	42	27	7	14	Hung

Polling agency					Lead
Polling agency	INDIA	BJP	JKPDP	Others	Lead
India Today – CVoter	38.7%	22.9%	10.2%	28.2%	15.8%
South First – People's Pulse	43%	24%	16%	17%	19%
Axis My India	38%	21%	9%	32%	6%

== Results ==
=== Results by alliance or party ===
Alliance/ Party			Votes	%	Seats Contested	Seats Won				
Alliance/ Party				INDIA		JKNC	13,36,147	23.43	56	42
INC	6,82,666	11.97		INDIA	39	6				
CPI(M)	33,634	0.59		INDIA	1	1				
Total	20,52,447	35.99		INDIA	96	49				
BJP			14,62,225	25.64	62	29				
JKPDP			5,11,434	8.97	81	3				
JKPC			1,41,692	2.48	20	1				
AAP			29,733	0.52	7	1				
JKAP			1,91,827	3.36	46	0				
JKNPP(I)			66,295	1.16	4	0				
IND			9,48,985	16.64	346	7				
Others			2,97,686	3.76	211	0				
NOTA			84,397	1.48						
Total			57,02,324	100%	873	90				

=== Results by division ===
Division	Seats				
Division	Seats	INDIA	BJP	PDP	OTH
Kashmir	47	41	0	3	3
Jammu	43	8	29	0	6
Total	90	49	29	3	9

=== Results by district ===
Division	District	Seats				
Division	District	Seats	INDIA	BJP	PDP	OTH
Kashmir	Kupwara	6	3	—N/a	1	2
Kashmir	Baramulla	7	7	—N/a	—N/a	—N/a
Kashmir	Bandipora	3	3	—N/a	—N/a	—N/a
Kashmir	Ganderbal	2	2	—N/a	—N/a	—N/a
Kashmir	Srinagar	8	8	—N/a	—N/a	—N/a
Kashmir	Budgam	5	5	—N/a	—N/a	—N/a
Kashmir	Pulwama	4	2	—N/a	2	—N/a
Kashmir	Shopian	2	1	—N/a	—N/a	1
Kashmir	Kulgam	3	3	—N/a	—N/a	—N/a
Kashmir	Anantnag	7	7	—N/a	—N/a	—N/a
Jammu	Kishtwar	3	—N/a	2	—N/a	1
Jammu	Doda	3	—N/a	2	—N/a	1
Jammu	Ramban	2	2	—N/a	—N/a	—N/a
Jammu	Reasi	3	1	2	—N/a	—N/a
Jammu	Udhampur	4	—N/a	4	—N/a	—N/a
Jammu	Kathua	6	—N/a	5	—N/a	1
Jammu	Samba	3	—N/a	3	—N/a	—N/a
Jammu	Jammu	11	—N/a	10	—N/a	1
Jammu	Rajouri	5	3	1	—N/a	1
Jammu	Poonch	3	2	—N/a	—N/a	1
Total		90	49	29	3	9

=== Results by constituency ===
District	Constituency		Winner				Runner-up				Margin
District	No.	Name	Candidate	Party	Votes	%	Candidate	Party	Votes	%	Margin
Kupwara	1	Karnah	Javaid Ahmad Mirchal	JKNC	14,294	34.59	Naseer Ahmad Awan	JKPC	8,032	19.44	6,262
Kupwara	2	Trehgam	Saifullah Mir	JKNC	18,002	33.74	Bashir Ahmad Dar	JKPC	14,376	26.95	3,636
Kupwara	3	Kupwara	Mir Mohammad Fayaz	JKPDP	27,773	44.76	Nasir Aslam Wani	JKNC	17,976	28.97	9,797
Kupwara	4	Lolab	Qaysar Jamshaid Lone	JKNC	19,603	33.73	Dawood Bashir Bhat	IND	11,732	19.77	7,871
Kupwara	5	Handwara	Sajad Gani Lone	JKPC	29,812	40.78	Chowdary Mohammad Ramzan	JKNC	29,150	39.88	662
Kupwara	6	Langate	Khursheed Ahmed Sheikh	IND	25,984	33.29	Irfan Sultan Pandithpuri	JKPC	24,382	31.23	1,602
Baramulla	7	Sopore	Irshad Rasool Kar	JKNC	26,975	55.32	Mursaleen Aajir	IND	6,619	12.84	20,356
Baramulla	8	Rafiabad	Javid Ahmad Dar	JKNC	28,783	40.42	Yawar Ahmad Mir	JKAP	19,581	27.50	9,202
Baramulla	9	Uri	Sajjad Safi	JKNC	39,713	53.73	Taj Mohiuddin	IND	25,244	34.16	14,469
Baramulla	10	Baramulla	Javid Hassan Baig	JKNC	22,523	32.75	Shoaib Nabi Lone	IND	10,750	15.63	11,773
Baramulla	11	Gulmarg	Farooq Ahmed Shah	JKNC	26,984	41.27	Ghulam Hassan Mir	JKAP	22,793	34.86	4,191
Baramulla	12	Wagoora–Kreeri	Irfan Hafiz Lone	INC	17,002	38.17	Syed Basharat Ahmed Bukhari	JKPDP	9,251	20.77	7,751
Baramulla	13	Pattan	Javaid Riyaz	JKNC	29,893	42.54	Imran Raza Ansari	JKPC	29,290	41.68	603
Bandipora	14	Sonawari	Hilal Akbar Lone	JKNC	31,535	37.07	Yasir Reshi	IND	17,791	20.94	13,744
Bandipora	15	Bandipora	Nizam Uddin Bhat	INC	20,391	27.45	Usman Abdul Majid	IND	19,580	26.35	811
Bandipora	16	Gurez (ST)	Nazir Ahmed Khan	JKNC	8,378	46.64	Faqeer Mohammad Khan	BJP	7,246	40.34	1,132
Ganderbal	17	Kangan (ST)	Mian Mehar Ali	JKNC	28,907	49.97	Syed Jamat Ali Shah	JKPDP	25,088	43.37	3,819
Ganderbal	18	Ganderbal	Omar Abdullah	JKNC	32,727	43.80	Bashir Ahmed Mir	JKPDP	22,153	29.65	10,574
Srinagar	19	Hazratbal	Salman Sagar	JKNC	18,890	51.52	Asiya Naqash	JKPDP	8,595	23.44	10,295
Srinagar	20	Khanyar	Ali Mohammad Sagar	JKNC	14,906	62.46	Sheikh Imran	IND	4,994	20.93	9,912
Srinagar	21	Habba Kadal	Shamim Firdous	JKNC	12,437	64.38	Ashok Kumar Bhat	BJP	2,899	15.08	9,538
Srinagar	22	Lal Chowk	Sheikh Ahsan Ahmed	JKNC	16,731	45.45	Mohammad Ashraf Mir	JKAP	5,388	14.64	11,765
Srinagar	23	Chanapora	Mushtaq Guroo	JKNC	13,717	53.94	Syed Mohammad Altaf Bukhari	JKAP	8,029	31.57	5,688
Srinagar	24	Zadibal	Tanvir Sadiq	JKNC	22,189	64.52	Abid Hussain Ansari	JKPDP	6,016	17.24	16,173
Srinagar	25	Eidgah	Mubarik Gul	JKNC	7,700	33.50	Ghulam Nabi Bhat	IND	6,020	26.19	1,680
Srinagar	26	Central Shalteng	Tariq Hameed Karra	INC	18,933	55.86	Muhammed Irfan Shah	IND	4,538	13.38	14,395
Budgam	27	Budgam	Omar Abdullah	JKNC	36,010	54.52	Aga Syed Muntazir Mehdi	JKPDP	17,525	26.53	18,485
Budgam	28	Beerwah	Shafi Ahmad Wani	JKNC	20,118	30.37	Nazir Ahmed Khan	IND	15,957	24.09	4,161
Budgam	29	Khan Sahib	Saif Ud Din Bhat	JKNC	33,225	48.62	Hakeem Yaseen	JKPDF(S)	21,611	31.63	11,614
Budgam	30	Charari Sharief	Abdul Rahim Rather	JKNC	35,957	48.48	Ghulam Nabi Lone	JKPDP	24,461	32.98	11,496
Budgam	31	Chadoora	Ali Mohammad Dar	JKNC	31,991	63.57	Mohammad Yaseen Bhat	JKPDP	14,773	29.36	17,218
Pulwama	32	Pampore	Hasnain Masoodi	JKNC	15,088	33.22	Zahoor Ahmed Mir	JKPDP	12,325	27.14	2,763
Pulwama	33	Tral	Rafiq Ahmad Naik	JKPDP	10,710	24.69	Surinder Singh	INC	10,250	23.63	460
Pulwama	34	Pulwama	Waheed Ur Rehman Para	JKPDP	24,716	48.94	Mohammad Khalil Band	JKNC	16,568	32.81	8,148
Pulwama	35	Rajpora	Ghulam Mohit Uddin Mir	JKNC	25,627	47.93	Syed Bashir Ahmad	JKPDP	11,314	21.16	14,313
Shopian	36	Zainapora	Showkat Hussain	JKNC	28,251	46.42	Aijaz Ahmed Mir	IND	15,018	24.67	13,233
Shopian	37	Shopian	Shabir Ahmad Kullay	IND	14,113	23.74	Rafi Mohammad Sheikh	IND	12,906	21.71	1,207
Kulgam	38	DH Pora	Sakeena Masood	JKNC	36,623	53.45	Gulzar Ahmad Dar	JKPDP	19,174	27.98	17,449
Kulgam	39	Kulgam	Md Yusuf Tarigami	CPI(M)	33,634	44.86	Sayar Ahmad Reshi	IND	25,796	34.40	7,838
Kulgam	40	Devsar	Peerzada Feroze Ahamad	JKNC	18,230	27.91	Mohammad Sartaj Madni	JKPDP	17,390	26.63	840
Anantnag	41	Dooru	Gulam Ahmad Mir	INC	44,270	61.15	Mohammad Ashraf Malik	JKPDP	14,542	20.09	29,728
Anantnag	42	Kokernag (ST)	Zafar Ali Khatana	JKNC	17,949	31.23	Haroon Rashid Khatana	JKPDP	11,787	20.51	6,162
Anantnag	43	Anantnag West	Abdul Majeed Bhat	JKNC	25,135	40.58	Abdul Gafar Sofi	JKPDP	14,700	23.74	10,435
Anantnag	44	Anantnag	Peerzada Mohammad Syed	INC	6,679	23.77	Mirza Mehboob Beg	JKPDP	4,993	17.77	1,686
Anantnag	45	Srigufwara–Bijbehara	Bashir Ahmed Shah Veeri	JKNC	33,299	56.63	Iltija Mehbooba Mufti	JKPDP	23,529	37.89	9,770
Anantnag	46	Shangus–Anantnag East	Reyaz Ahmad Khan	JKNC	30,345	52.32	Abdul Rehman Veeri	JKPDP	15,813	27.27	14,532
Anantnag	47	Pahalgam	Altaf Ahmad Wani	JKNC	26,210	52.25	Rafi Ahmad Mir	JKAP	12,454	24.83	13,756
Kishtwar	48	Inderwal	Payare Lal Sharma	IND	14,195	26.36	Ghulam Mohd Saroori	IND	13,552	25.16	643
Kishtwar	49	Kishtwar	Shagun Parihar	BJP	29,053	48.00	Sajjad Ahmad Kichloo	JKNC	28,532	47.41	521
Kishtwar	50	Padder–Nagseni	Sunil Kumar Sharma	BJP	17,036	50.41	Pooja Thakur	JKNC	15,490	45.83	1,546
Doda	51	Bhadarwah	Daleep Singh	BJP	42,128	48.98	Sheikh Mehboob Iqbal	JKNC	31,998	37.20	10,130
Doda	52	Doda	Mehraj Malik	AAP	23,228	31.83	Gajay Singh Rana	BJP	18,690	25.61	4,538
Doda	53	Doda West	Shakti Raj Parihar	BJP	33,964	49.99	Pardeep Kumar	INC	30,511	44.91	3,453
Ramban	54	Ramban	Arjun Singh Raju	JKNC	28,425	41.07	Suraj Singh Parihar	IND	19,412	28.05	9,013
Ramban	55	Banihal	Sajad Shaheen	JKNC	33,128	36.67	Imtiaz Ahmad Shan	JKPDP	27,018	29.66	6,110
Reasi	56	Gulabgarh (ST)	Khurshied Ahmed	JKNC	30,591	42.82	Ajaz Ahmed Khan	IND	24,064	33.69	6,527
Reasi	57	Reasi	Kuldeep Raj Dubey	BJP	39.647	63.51	Mumtaz Ahmed	INC	20,832	33.37	18,815
Reasi	58	Shri Mata Vaishno Devi	Baldev Raj Sharma	BJP	18,199	39.96	Jugal Kishore	IND	16,204	35.58	1,995
Udhampur	59	Udhampur West	Pawan Kumar Gupta	BJP	47,164	51.06	Summit Mangotra	INC	26,412	29.15	20,752
Udhampur	60	Udhampur East	Ranbir Singh Pathania	BJP	32,966	41.61	Pawan Khajuriya	IND	30,647	38.69	2,349
Udhampur	61	Chenani	Balwant Singh Mankotia	BJP	47,990	56.40	Harsh Dev Singh	JKNPP(I)	32,379	38.06	15,611
Udhampur	62	Ramnagar (SC)	Sunil Bhardwaj	BJP	34,550	48.50	Ashri Devi	JKNPP(I)	25,244	35.44	9,306
Kathua	63	Bani	Rameshwar Singh	IND	18,672	43.43	Jewan Lal	BJP	16,624	38.67	2,048
Kathua	64	Billawar	Satish Kumar Sharma	BJP	44,629	64.38	Manohar Lal Sharma	INC	23,261	33.56	21,368
Kathua	65	Basohli	Darshan Kumar	BJP	31,874	65.38	Chaudhary Lal Singh	INC	15,840	32.49	16,034
Kathua	66	Jasrota	Rajiv Jasrotia	BJP	34,157	51.94	Brijeshwar Singh	IND	21,737	33.05	12,420
Kathua	67	Kathua (SC)	Bharat Bhushan	BJP	45,944	55.19	Sandeep Majotra	BSP	33,827	40.64	12,117
Kathua	68	Hiranagar	Vijay Kumar	BJP	36,737	54.75	Rakesh Kumar	INC	28,127	41.92	8,610
Samba	69	Ramgarh (SC)	Devinder Kumar Manyal	BJP	35,672	51.53	Yash Paul Kundal	INC	21,470	31.02	14,202
Samba	70	Samba	Surjeet Singh Slathia	BJP	43,182	61.74	Ravinder Singh	IND	12,873	18.41	30,309
Samba	71	Vijaypur	Chander Prakash Ganga	BJP	32,859	52.60	Rajesh Kumar Pargotra	JKNC	13,819	22.12	19,040
Jammu	72	Bishnah (SC)	Rajeev Kumar	BJP	53,435	56.48	Neeraj Kundan	INC	37808	39.96	15,627
Jammu	73	Suchetgarh (SC)	Gharu Ram Bhagat	BJP	39,302	46.32	Bhushan Lal	INC	28,161	33.19	11,141
Jammu	74	RS Pora–Jammu South	Narinder Singh Raina	BJP	43,317	49.23	Raman Bhalla	INC	41,351	47.00	1,966
Jammu	75	Bahu	Vikram Randhawa	BJP	40,385	55.34	Taranjit Singh Tony	INC	29,134	39.92	11,251
Jammu	76	Jammu East	Yudhvir Sethi	BJP	42,589	61.46	Yogesh Sawhney	INC	24,475	34.35	18,114
Jammu	77	Nagrota	Devender Singh Rana	BJP	48,113	64.94	Joginder Singh	JKNC	17,641	23.81	30,472
Jammu	78	Jammu West	Arvind Gupta	BJP	41,963	64.74	Thakur Manmohan Singh	INC	19,836	30.60	22,127
Jammu	79	Jammu North	Sham Lal Sharma	BJP	47,219	63.66	Ajay Kumar Sadhotra	JKNC	19,856	26.77	27,363
Jammu	80	Marh (SC)	Surinder Kumar	BJP	42,563	55.25	Mula Ram	INC	19,477	25.28	23,086
Jammu	81	Akhnoor (SC)	Mohan Lal	BJP	49,927	64.87	Ashok Kumar	INC	24,679	32.81	25,248
Jammu	82	Chhamb	Satish Sharma	IND	33,985	39.09	Rajeev Sharma	BJP	27,056	31.12	6,929
Rajouri	83	Kalakote–Sunderbani	Randhir Singh	BJP	35,010	50.81	Yashu Vardhan Singh	JKNC	20,601	29.90	14,409
Rajouri	84	Nowshera	Surinder Choudhary	JKNC	35,069	54.16	Ravinder Raina	BJP	27,250	42.09	7,819
Rajouri	85	Rajouri (ST)	Iftkar Ahmed	INC	28,293	45.04	Vibod Gupta	BJP	27,519	42.85	1,404
Rajouri	86	Budhal (ST)	Javaid Iqbal	JKNC	42,043	61.49	Chowdhary Zulfkar Ali	BJP	23,135	33.84	18,908
Rajouri	87	Thanamandi (ST)	Muzaffar Iqbal Khan	IND	32,645	28.96	Mohd Iqbal Malik	BJP	26,466	24.06	6,179
Poonch	88	Surankote (ST)	Choudhary Mohammed Akram	IND	34,201	39.37	Mohd Shahnawaz	INC	25,350	29.18	8,551
Poonch	89	Poonch Haveli	Ajaz Ahmed Jan	JKNC	41,807	42.72	Choudhary Abdul Ghani	BJP	20,879	21.39	20,879
Poonch	90	Mendhar (ST)	Javed Ahmed Rana	JKNC	32,176	38.89	Murtaza Ahmed Khan	BJP	17,270	20.87	14,906

== Aftermath ==
The INDIA coalition including the Jammu and Kashmir National Conference, the Indian National Congress and Communist Party of India (Marxist), secured 49 seats, one more than the 48 seats needed to form a government, with JKNC winning 42 of these. President of the JKNC, Farooq Abdullah, stated that Omar Abdullah will be their nominee for Chief Minister of Jammu and Kashmir. On 8 October, the BJP conceded defeat and congratulated Omar Abdullah. On 10 October, four independent MLAs pledged to support the incoming National Conference led government. On 11 October, the Aam Aadmi Party offered its support to an Omar Abdullah led administration but later withdrew it. Omar Abdullah met with the Lieutenant Governor of Jammu and Kashmir, Manoj Sinha, on 11 October and sworn in as Chief Minister on 16 October 2024. The Indian National Congress did not join the Second Omar Abdullah ministry but gave outside confidence support.

== Reactions ==
=== Domestic ===
On 8 October 2024, senior BJP leader Mukhtar Abbas Naqvi congratulated Omar Abdullah on the National Conference's election victory and expressed hope that the new government would focus on regional development, welfare peace, prosperity and human rights. Later that day prime minister Narendra Modi complimented the National Conference in what he described as a "commendable performance".

=== Foreign ===
==== Pakistan ====
On 18 September 2024, Pakistan's President Asif Ali Zardari categorically rejected the J&K legislative assembly elections in the Indian-administered Kashmir asserting that the polls were "no substitute for the Kashmiri people’s right to self-determination". The defense minister of Pakistan Khawaja Asif stated that "There is a high chance the INDIA bloc may come to power and that the bloc and the country are on the same page when it comes to the problems of Article 370 and 35A." This attracted a series of controversy with the BJP leader and Home Minister of India Amit Shah saying "The Congress has always been hand in glove with anti-national forces." BJP leaders further accused the INDIA bloc of being anti-nationalist forces and received endorsements from the Pakistan government. JKNC leader Farooq Abdullah reacted to Asif's remarks, saying “I don’t know what Pakistan says. I am not a Pakistani, I am an Indian citizen.”

== By-elections ==
Date	S.No	Constituency	MLA before election	Party before election	Reason	Elected MLA	Party after election
Nov 11, 2025	27	Budgam	Omar Abdullah	Jammu & Kashmir National Conference	(Note: Vacated by Chief Minister Omar Abdullah after he won two seats in the 2024 assembly elections and chose to retain Ganderbal.)	Aga Syed Muntazir Mehdi	Jammu and Kashmir Peoples Democratic Party
Nov 11, 2025	77	Nagrota	Devender Singh Rana	Bharatiya Janata Party	(Note: Vacated due to the demise of BJP legislator Devender Singh Rana.)	Devyani Singh Rana	Bharatiya Janata Party

== See also ==
- 2024 elections in India
- Elections in Jammu and Kashmir
- Politics of Jammu and Kashmir
- List of chief ministers of Jammu and Kashmir
- List of lieutenant governors of Jammu and Kashmir
- Jammu and Kashmir State Election Commission
