= Ashok Kumar Khajuria =

Indian politician

Ashok Kumar Khajuria is an Indian politician and member of the Bharatiya Janata Party. Khajuria was a member of the Jammu and Kashmir Legislative Assembly from the Jammu East constituency in Jammu district. He was also Member of J&K legislative council.
