= Jammu and Kashmir Legislative Assembly =

Unicameral legislature of the Indian union territory of Jammu and Kashmir

- 1st Jammu and Kashmir Assembly (union territory)
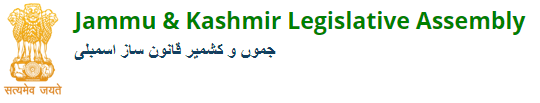

Type
- Type: Unicameral Lower house (1957–2019)
- Term limits: 5 years

History
- Founded: 7 October 1934
- Preceded by: Jammu and Kashmir Constituent Assembly

Leadership
- Lieutenant Governor: Manoj Sinha since 7 August 2020
- Speaker: Abdul Rahim Rather, JKNC since 4 November 2024
- Leader of the House (Chief Minister): Omar Abdullah, JKNC since 16 October 2024
- Deputy Leader of the House (Deputy Chief Minister): Surinder Kumar Choudhary, JKNC since 16 October 2024
- Leader of the Opposition: Sunil Kumar Sharma, BJP since 3 November 2024
- Deputy Leaders of the Opposition: Surjeet Singh Slathia, BJP; Pawan Kumar Gupta, BJP since 2 June 2025

Structure
- Seats: 95 (Note: 90 directly elected members and 5 appointed members by the Government of India.)
- Political groups: Government (54): JKNC (41); INC (6); CPI(M) (1); IND (6); Opposition (36): BJP (29); JKPDP (4); AAP (1); JKAIP (1); JKPC (1); Nominated (5): Nominated members (5)

Elections
- Voting system: 90 seats elected via First past the post; 5 seats nominated by the Lieutenant Governor
- First election: 24 February – 25 March 1957
- Last election: 18 September – 1 October 2024
- Next election: By November 3rd, 2029

Meeting place
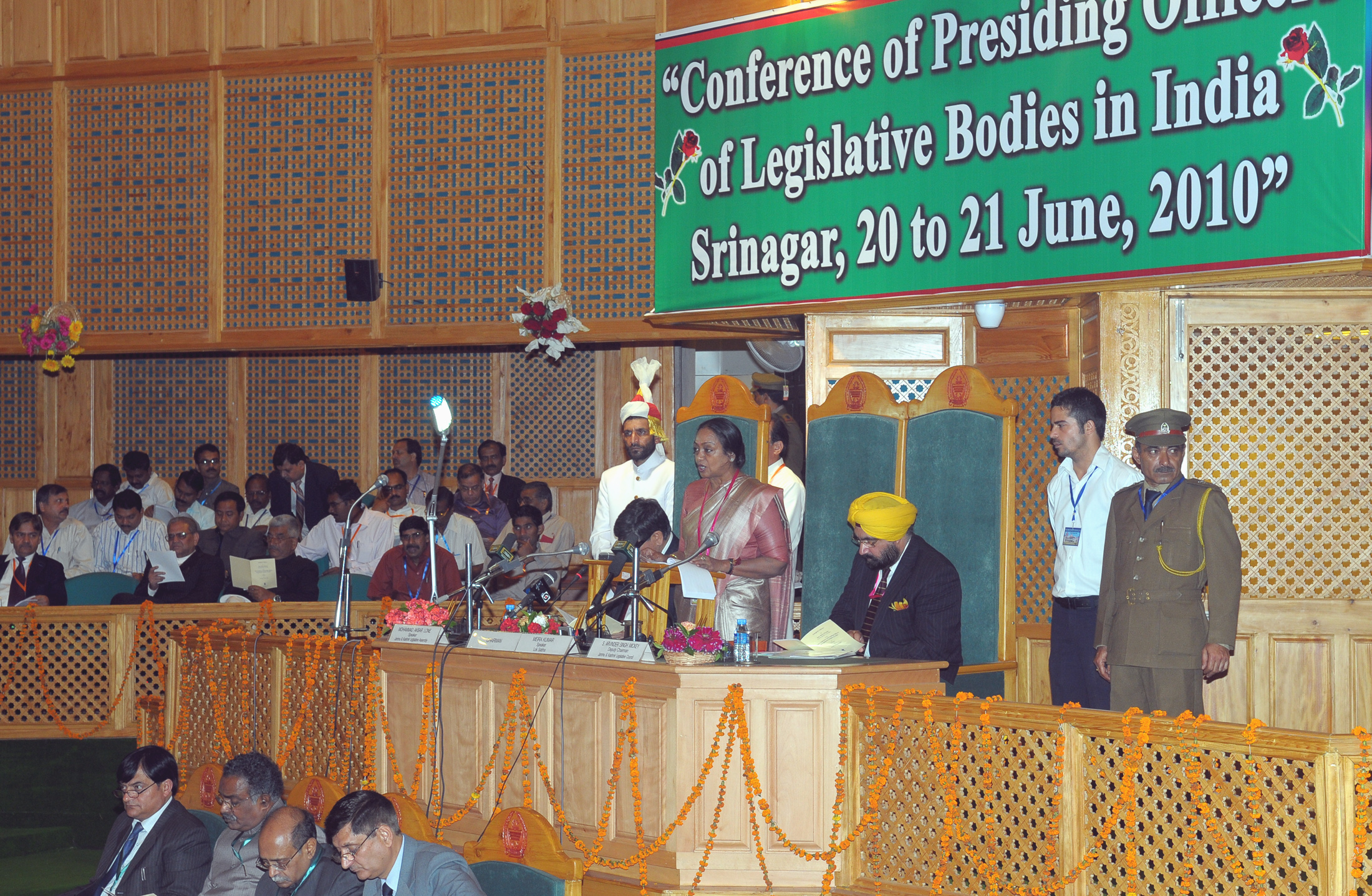
- Legislative Assembly, Srinagar (Autumn session)
- Legislative Assembly, Jammu (Winter session)

Website
- jkla.neva.gov.in

The Jammu and Kashmir Legislative Assembly is the unicameral legislature of Indian union territory of Jammu and Kashmir. Jammu and Kashmir Legislative Assembly is the legislative arm of the Government of Jammu and Kashmir. At present, it consists of 95 members, directly elected from 95 constituencies. The tenure of the Legislative Assembly is five years unless dissolved sooner.

Prior to 2019, the State of Jammu and Kashmir had a bicameral legislature with a legislative assembly (lower house) and a legislative council (upper house). The Jammu and Kashmir Reorganisation Act, passed by the Parliament of India in August 2019, replaced this with a unicameral legislature while also re-organising the state into a union territory. The current assembly was elected in September and October 2024.

== History ==
=== Praja Sabha ===
The first legislature of the princely state of Jammu and Kashmir, called the Praja Sabha, was established by the government of the Maharaja Hari Singh in 1934. It had 33 elected seats, 30 nominated members and 12 ex-officio members.

The first election in 1934 saw the Liberal Group headed by Pandit Ram Chander Dubey emerge as the largest party and the Muslim Conference as the second largest (with 14 seats). Further elections were held in 1938 and 1947.

In 1939, the Muslim Conference party renamed itself to National Conference under the leadership of Sheikh Abdullah and opened its membership to people of all religions. It launched a Quit Kashmir movement in 1946 and boycotted the 1947 election.

=== Post-accession ===
After the accession of the princely state of Jammu and Kashmir to the Union of India in 1947, the Maharaja ceded powers to a popular government headed by Sheikh Abdullah. Elections for a constituent assembly were held in 1951, in which Abdullah's National Conference won all 75 seats.

In 1957, a new constitution was adopted by the constituent assembly, which established a bicameral legislature consisting of an upper house, the Jammu and Kashmir Legislative Council and a lower house, the Jammu and Kashmir Legislative Assembly. Wali Mohammad Itoo of the National Conference was speaker of the assembly between 7 July 1983 and 31 July 1984.

=== Union Territory (with legislation) ===
In 2019, Article 370 of the Constitution of India, which gave special status to Jammu and Kashmir, was abrogated and Jammu and Kashmir Reorganisation Act was passed to reconstitute the state of Jammu and Kashmir into union territories of Jammu and Kashmir and Ladakh with effect from 31 October 2019. The union territory of Jammu and Kashmir has a unicameral Legislative Assembly. The Jammu and Kashmir Legislative Council was formally abolished on 31 October 2019.

In March 2020, a three-member Delimitation Commission was formed, chaired by retired Justice Ranjana Prakash Desai, for the delimitation of the union territory of Jammu and Kashmir. The commission published its interim report in February 2022. The final delimitation report was released on 5 May 2022 and it came into force from 20 May 2022.

The first elections to the reconstituted assembly with 90 elected seats were held in September 2024.

== Composition ==
=== Initial Composition ===
The Legislative Assembly was initially composed of 100 members, later increased to 111 by the then Constitution of Jammu and Kashmir (Twentieth Amendment) Act of 1988. Of these, 24 seats were designated for the territorial constituencies of the state that came under Pakistani control in 1947. These seats remained officially vacant as per section 48 of the then state constitution and now also in The Constitution of India. These seats were not taken into account for reckoning the total membership of the assembly, especially for deciding quorum and voting majorities for legislation and government formation. Hence the total contestable and filled seats of the assembly were 87 seats. The Kashmir Valley region had 46 seats, the Jammu region had 37 seats, and Ladakh region had 4 seats.

=== State Reorganisation and Delimitation ===
Jammu and Kashmir Reorganisation Act was passed to reconstitute the state of Jammu and Kashmir into union territories of Jammu and Kashmir and Ladakh. In March 2020, Delimitation Commission was formed for the delimitation of the union territory of Jammu and Kashmir prior to the 2024 Jammu and Kashmir Legislative Assembly election. The delimitation report added additional 6 seats to the Jammu division and 1 seat to Kashmir division. After delimitation, the total seats in the assembly rose to a total of 119 seats with 114 elected seats, out of which 24 seats are designated for areas that fall under Pakistan-administered Kashmir and 5 seats are to be nominated by the Lt. Governor of UT. Out of the remaining 90 seats, 43 seats are in Jammu division and 47 seats are in the Kashmir division. With this, hindu majority Jammu with a population of 53 lakh (43% of the total population of 1.22 crore) will have 47% seats, while muslim majority Kashmir which has a population of 68 lakh (56%) will have 52% of the seats.

==== Reservation for SC/STs ====
The parliament passed the Jammu and Kashmir Reorganisation (Amendment) Bill 2023 which provides for reservation of 7 seats for the Scheduled Castes and 9 seats for the Scheduled Tribes.

=== Provisions for Nominated Members ===
Jammu and Kashmir Reorganisation Act, 2019 provides for nomination of 2 members to the Legislative Assembly by the Lieutenant Governor if women are not adequately represented in the house. Following amendment to the Act in 2023, the Lieutenant Governor may also nominate two representatives of Kashmiri migrant families (one seat reserved for woman) and one member to represent the migrants from Pakistan-administered Kashmir, presently making the total number of nominated members maximum five.

== Tenure and functions ==
Members of the Legislative Assembly were elected for a six-year term up to 2019 and five-year term thereafter. The seats are filled by direct election from single member constituencies using the first past the post method. The assembly may be dissolved before the completion of the full term by the Lieutenant Governor upon the advice of the Chief Minister. The Lieutenant Governor may also convene special sessions of the legislative assembly.

== Membership by party ==
The membership of the 1st Jammu and Kashmir UT Assembly by party is as follows:

Party	MLAs	Leader
JKNC	41	Omar Abdullah
BJP	29	Sunil Kumar Sharma
INC	6	Ghulam Ahmad Mir
JKPDP	4	Waheed Para
JKPC	1	Sajjad Gani Lone
AIP	1	Khursheed Ahmed Sheikh
CPI(M)	1	Mohammed Yousuf Tarigami
AAP	1	Mehraj Malik
IND	6	
Total	90	

== Members ==
=== Office bearers ===
Office	Holder	Since
Speaker	Abdul Rahim Rather	4 November 2024
Chief Minister (Leader of the House)	Omar Abdullah	16 October 2024
Deputy Chief Minister (Deputy Leader of the House)	Surinder Kumar Choudhary	16 October 2024
Leader of the Opposition	Sunil Kumar Sharma	3 November 2024
Secretary	Manoj Kumar Pandit	31 October 2022

=== Members of Legislative Assembly (MLA) ===
The membership of the assembly is as follows:

District	Constituency		Name	Party	Remarks
District	No.	Name	Name	Party	Remarks
Kupwara	1	Karnah	Javaid Ahmad Mirchal	JKNC	
Kupwara	2	Trehgam	Saifullah Mir	JKNC	
Kupwara	3	Kupwara	Mir Mohammad Fayaz	JKPDP	
Kupwara	4	Lolab	Qaysar Jamshaid Lone	JKNC	
Kupwara	5	Handwara	Sajad Gani Lone	JKPC	
Kupwara	6	Langate	Khursheed Ahmed Sheikh	AIP	
Baramulla	7	Sopore	Irshad Rasool Kar	JKNC	
Baramulla	8	Rafiabad	Javid Ahmad Dar	JKNC	Cabinet Minister
Baramulla	9	Uri	Sajjad Safi	JKNC	
Baramulla	10	Baramulla	Javid Hassan Baig	JKNC	
Baramulla	11	Gulmarg	Pirzada Farooq Ahmed Shah	JKNC	
Baramulla	12	Wagoora–Kreeri	Irfan Hafiz Lone	INC	
Baramulla	13	Pattan	Javaid Riyaz	JKNC	
Bandipora	14	Sonawari	Hilal Akbar Lone	JKNC	
Bandipora	15	Bandipora	Nizam Uddin Bhat	INC	
Bandipora	16	Gurez (ST)	Nazir Ahmed Khan	JKNC	
Ganderbal	17	Kangan (ST)	Mian Mehar Ali	JKNC	
Ganderbal	18	Ganderbal	Omar Abdullah	JKNC	Chief Minister
Srinagar	19	Hazratbal	Salman Sagar	JKNC	
Srinagar	20	Khanyar	Ali Mohammad Sagar	JKNC	
Srinagar	21	Habba Kadal	Shamim Firdous	JKNC	
Srinagar	22	Lal Chowk	Sheikh Ahsan Ahmed	JKNC	
Srinagar	23	Chanapora	Mushtaq Guroo	JKNC	
Srinagar	24	Zadibal	Tanvir Sadiq	JKNC	
Srinagar	25	Eidgah	Mubarik Gul	JKNC	
Srinagar	26	Central Shalteng	Tariq Hameed Karra	INC	
Budgam	27	Budgam	Omar Abdullah	JKNC	Resigned on 21 October 2024
Budgam	27	Budgam	Aga Syed Muntazir Mehdi	JKPDP	Elected in by-election
Budgam	28	Beerwah	Shafi Ahmad Wani	JKNC	
Budgam	29	Khan Sahib	Saif Ud Din Bhat	JKNC	
Budgam	30	Charari Sharief	Abdul Rahim Rather	JKNC	Speaker
Budgam	31	Chadoora	Ali Mohammad Dar	JKNC	
Pulwama	32	Pampore	Hasnain Masoodi	JKNC	
Pulwama	33	Tral	Rafiq Ahmad Naik	JKPDP	
Pulwama	34	Pulwama	Waheed Ur Rehman Para	JKPDP	
Pulwama	35	Rajpora	Ghulam Mohit Uddin Mir	JKNC	
Shopian	36	Zainapora	Showkat Hussain	JKNC	
Shopian	37	Shopian	Shabir Ahmad Kullay	IND	
Kulgam	38	DH Pora	Sakina Itoo	JKNC	Cabinet Minister
Kulgam	39	Kulgam	Mohammad Yusuf Tarigami	CPI(M)	
Kulgam	40	Devsar	Peerzada Feroze Ahamad	JKNC	
Anantnag	41	Dooru	Gulam Ahmad Mir	INC	
Anantnag	42	Kokernag (ST)	Zafar Ali Khatana	JKNC	
Anantnag	43	Anantnag West	Abdul Majeed Bhat	JKNC	
Anantnag	44	Anantnag	Peerzada Mohammad Syed	INC	
Anantnag	45	Srigufwara–Bijbehara	Bashir Ahmed Shah Veeri	JKNC	
Anantnag	46	Shangus–Anantnag East	Reyaz Ahmad Khan	JKNC	
Anantnag	47	Pahalgam	Altaf Ahmad Wani	JKNC	
Kishtwar	48	Inderwal	Payare Lal Sharma	IND	Supports JKNC
Kishtwar	49	Kishtwar	Shagun Parihar	BJP	
Kishtwar	50	Padder–Nagseni	Sunil Kumar Sharma	BJP	Leader of Opposition
Doda	51	Bhadarwah	Daleep Singh	BJP	
Doda	52	Doda	Mehraj Malik	AAP	
Doda	53	Doda West	Shakti Raj Parihar	BJP	
Ramban	54	Ramban	Arjun Singh Raju	JKNC	
Ramban	55	Banihal	Sajad Shaheen	JKNC	
Reasi	56	Gulabgarh (ST)	Khurshied Ahmed	JKNC	
Reasi	57	Reasi	Kuldeep Raj Dubey	BJP	
Reasi	58	Shri Mata Vaishno Devi	Baldev Raj Sharma	BJP	
Udhampur	59	Udhampur West	Pawan Kumar Gupta	BJP	
Udhampur	60	Udhampur East	Ranbir Singh Pathania	BJP	
Udhampur	61	Chenani	Balwant Singh Mankotia	BJP	
Udhampur	62	Ramnagar (SC)	Sunil Bhardwaj	BJP	
Kathua	63	Bani	Rameshwar Singh Thakur	IND	Supports JKNC
Kathua	64	Billawar	Satish Kumar Sharma	BJP	
Kathua	65	Basohli	Thakur Darshan Singh	BJP	
Kathua	66	Jasrota	Rajiv Jasrotia	BJP	
Kathua	67	Kathua (SC)	Bharat Bhushan	BJP	
Kathua	68	Hiranagar	Vijay Kumar Sharma	BJP	
Samba	69	Ramgarh (SC)	Devinder Kumar Manyal	BJP	
Samba	70	Samba	Surjeet Singh Slathia	BJP	
Samba	71	Vijaypur	Chander Prakash Ganga	BJP	
Jammu	72	Bishnah (SC)	Rajeev Kumar	BJP	
Jammu	73	Suchetgarh (SC)	Gharu Ram Bhagat	BJP	
Jammu	74	RS Pora–Jammu South	Narinder Singh Raina	BJP	
Jammu	75	Bahu	Vikram Randhawa	BJP	
Jammu	76	Jammu East	Yudhvir Sethi	BJP	
Jammu	77	Nagrota	Devender Singh Rana	BJP	Died on 31 October 2024
Jammu	77	Nagrota	Devyani Singh Rana	BJP	Elected in by-election
Jammu	78	Jammu West	Arvind Gupta	BJP	
Jammu	79	Jammu North	Sham Lal Sharma	BJP	
Jammu	80	Marh (SC)	Surinder Kumar	BJP	
Jammu	81	Akhnoor (SC)	Mohan Lal	BJP	
Jammu	82	Chhamb	Satish Sharma	IND	Supports JKNC; Cabinet Minister
Rajouri	83	Kalakote–Sunderbani	Randhir Singh	BJP	
Rajouri	84	Nowshera	Surinder Choudhary	JKNC	Deputy Chief Minister
Rajouri	85	Rajouri (ST)	Iftkar Ahmed	INC	
Rajouri	86	Budhal (ST)	Javaid Iqbal	JKNC	
Rajouri	87	Thanamandi (ST)	Muzaffar Iqbal Khan	IND	
Poonch	88	Surankote (ST)	Choudhary Mohammed Akram	IND	Supports JKNC
Poonch	89	Poonch Haveli	Ajaz Ahmed Jan	JKNC	
Poonch	90	Mendhar (ST)	Javed Ahmed Rana	JKNC	Cabinet Minister

== See also ==
- Elections in Jammu and Kashmir
- List of constituencies of the Jammu and Kashmir Legislative Assembly
- Government of Jammu and Kashmir
- List of chief ministers of Jammu and Kashmir
- List of deputy chief ministers of Jammu and Kashmir
