= Ramgarh Assembly constituency =

Ramgarh Assembly constituency may refer to

- Ramgarh, Bihar Assembly constituency
- Ramgarh, Jammu and Kashmir Assembly constituency
- Ramgarh, Jharkhand Assembly constituency
- Ramgarh, Rajasthan Assembly constituency
