= Vijaypur, Jammu and Kashmir Assembly constituency =

Constituency of the Jammu and Kashmir Legislative Assembly

Coordinates: 32.57°N 75.02°E

Vijaypur
- Constituency No. 71 for the Jammu and Kashmir Legislative Assembly

Constituency details
- Country: India
- State: Jammu and Kashmir
- District: Samba
- Lok Sabha constituency: Jammu
- Established: 1996

Member of Legislative Assembly
- Incumbent Chander Prakash Ganga
- Party: BJP
- Alliance: NDA
- Elected year: 2024

Vijaypur Assembly constituency is one of the 90 constituencies in the Jammu and Kashmir Legislative Assembly of Jammu and Kashmir a north state of India. Vijaypur is also part of Jammu Lok Sabha constituency.

== Members of the Legislative Assembly ==
Election	Member	Party
1996	Surjeet Singh Slathia	Jammu and Kashmir National Conference
2002	Manjit Singh	Bahujan Samaj Party
2008	Surjeet Singh Slathia	Jammu and Kashmir National Conference
2014	Chander Prakash Ganga	Bharatiya Janata Party
2024	Chander Prakash Ganga	Bharatiya Janata Party

== Election results ==
=== Assembly Election 2024 ===
2024 Jammu and Kashmir Legislative Assembly election : Vijaypur
Party	Candidate	Votes	%	±%
BJP	Chader Prakash Sharma	32,859	52.60%	▲9.16
JKNC	Rajesh Kumar Pargotra	13,819	22.12%	New
JKAP	Manjit Singh	13,161	21.07%	New
JKPDP	Bachan Lal	672	1.08%	▼2.84
BSP	Raj Kumar Chalotra	544	0.87%	▲0.16
NOTA	None of the Above	320	0.51%	▲0.22
Margin of victory		19,040	30.48%	▲16.78
Turnout		62,465	77.56%	▼1.02
Registered electors		80,536		▼28.78
BJP hold		Swing	▲9.16	

=== Assembly Election 2014 ===
2014 Jammu and Kashmir Legislative Assembly election : Vijaypur
Party	Candidate	Votes	%	±%
BJP	Chader Prakash Sharma	38,607	43.45%	▲17.80
JKNC	Surjeet Singh Slathia	26,435	29.75%	▲2.54
INC	Manjit Singh	15,761	17.74%	▲15.95
JKPDP	Harmesh Singh Slathia	3,480	3.92%	▼12.26
Independent	Raj Singh	1,108	1.25%	New
BSP	Jagdish Raj	629	0.71%	▼0.67
Independent	Rajan Jamwal	543	0.61%	New
NOTA	None of the Above	263	0.30%	New
Margin of victory		12,172	13.70%	▲12.13
Turnout		88,857	78.58%	▼1.69
Registered electors		1,13,082		▲17.10
BJP gain from JKNC		Swing	▲16.24	

=== Assembly Election 2008 ===
2008 Jammu and Kashmir Legislative Assembly election : Vijaypur
Party	Candidate	Votes	%	±%
JKNC	Surjeet Singh Slathia	21,090	27.21%	▼4.16
BJP	Chader Prakash Sharma	19,878	25.64%	▲5.07
JKPDP	Manjit Singh	12,536	16.17%	▲15.22
JKNPP	Rajesh Kumar Pargotra	11,051	14.26%	▲12.49
Independent	Sat Paul	6,091	7.86%	New
INC	Hari Singh	1,383	1.78%	▼1.62
BSP	Jarnail Singh	1,066	1.38%	▼37.83
Independent	Tara Chand Sharma	882	1.14%	New
Independent	Rajinder Singh Jamwal	586	0.76%	New
NCP	Sudarshan Kumar	529	0.68%	New
BBP	Milap Singh	511	0.66%	New
Margin of victory		1,212	1.56%	▼6.27
Turnout		77,515	80.27%	▲16.14
Registered electors		96,568		▼4.43
JKNC gain from BSP		Swing	▼12.00	

=== Assembly Election 2002 ===
2002 Jammu and Kashmir Legislative Assembly election : Vijaypur
Party	Candidate	Votes	%	±%
BSP	Manjit Singh	25,406	39.21%	▲3.90
JKNC	Surjeet Singh Slathia	20,329	31.37%	▼4.38
BJP	Chader Prakash Sharma	13,332	20.57%	▲11.97
INC	Prakash Sharma	2,205	3.40%	▼7.78
JKNPP	Rajesh Kumar Pargotra	1,148	1.77%	▲1.14
JKPDP	Ganesh Kumar Sharma	619	0.96%	New
SS	Anil Gupta	587	0.91%	New
Independent	Des Raj	394	0.61%	New
Margin of victory		5,077	7.83%	▲7.39
Turnout		64,802	64.19%	▼2.41
Registered electors		1,01,046		▲37.11
BSP gain from JKNC		Swing	▲3.46	

=== Assembly Election 1996 ===
1996 Jammu and Kashmir Legislative Assembly election : Vijaypur
Party	Candidate	Votes	%	±%
JKNC	Surjeet Singh Slathia	17,529	35.75%	New
BSP	Manjit Singh	17,311	35.30%	New
INC	Rani Gargi Blowria	5,484	11.18%	New
BJP	Suresh Jamwal	4,221	8.61%	New
JD	Gurbachan Kumari Rana	2,069	4.22%	New
Independent	Rattan Chand Sharma	1,118	2.28%	New
Independent	Raspal Singh Bogal	454	0.93%	New
Independent	Ragubir Singh Slathia	326	0.66%	New
JKNPP	Som Nath	312	0.64%	New
Margin of victory		218	0.44%	
Turnout		49,037	67.49%	
Registered electors		73,696		
JKNC win (new seat)				

== See also ==
- Vijaypur
- List of constituencies of Jammu and Kashmir Legislative Assembly
