= Kalakote–Sunderbani Assembly constituency =

Constituency of the Jammu and Kashmir Legislative Assembly

Coordinates: 33.22°N 74.42°E

Kalakote–Sunderbani
- Constituency No. 83 for the Jammu and Kashmir Legislative Assembly

Constituency details
- Country: India
- State: Jammu and Kashmir
- District: Rajouri
- Lok Sabha constituency: Jammu
- Established: 2022
- Reservation: None

Member of Legislative Assembly
- Incumbent Randhir Singh
- Party: BJP
- Alliance: NDA
- Elected year: 2024

Kalakote–Sunderbani Assembly constituency is one of the 90 constituencies in the Jammu and Kashmir Legislative Assembly of Jammu and Kashmir a north state of India. Kalakote is also part of Jammu Lok Sabha constituency.

== Members of Legislative Assembly ==
Year	Member	Party
Kalakote
1996	Ashok Kumar Sharma	Indian National Congress
2002	Rachhpal Singh	Jammu and Kashmir National Conference
2008	Rachhpal Singh	Jammu and Kashmir National Conference
2014	Abdul Ghani Kohli	Bharatiya Janata Party
Kalakote–Sunderbani
2024	Randhir Singh	Bharatiya Janata Party

== Election results ==
=== Assembly Election 2024 ===
2024 Jammu and Kashmir Legislative Assembly election : Kalakote–Sunderbani
Party	Candidate	Votes	%	±%
BJP	Randhir Singh	35,010	50.81%	▲12.68
JKNC	Yashu Vardhan Singh	20,601	29.90%	New
JKAP	Arun K Sharma	9,380	13.61%	New
DPAP	Ashok Kumar Sharma	1,695	2.46%	New
NOTA	None of the Above	577	0.84%	▼0.32
JKPDP	Majid Hussain Shah	507	0.74%	▼11.85
Margin of victory		14,409	20.91%	▲11.57
Turnout		68,903	70.64%	▼6.02
Registered electors		97,541		▲13.02
BJP hold		Swing	▲12.68	

=== Assembly Election 2014 ===
2014 Jammu and Kashmir Legislative Assembly election : Kalakote
Party	Candidate	Votes	%	±%
BJP	Abdul Ghani Kohli	25,225	38.13%	▲35.56
JKNC	Rachhpal Singh	19,047	28.79%	▼16.83
INC	Ashok Kumar Sharma	10,520	15.90%	▲14.07
JKPDP	Asad Bari Shah	8,325	12.58%	▼1.37
BSP	Mohammed Rafiq	1,472	2.22%	▼4.71
NOTA	None of the Above	766	1.16%	New
Independent	Ashok Kumar	526	0.80%	New
Margin of victory		6,178	9.34%	▼11.24
Turnout		66,162	76.66%	▲3.34
Registered electors		86,303		▲14.03
BJP gain from JKNC		Swing	▼7.49	

=== Assembly Election 2008 ===
2008 Jammu and Kashmir Legislative Assembly election : Kalakote
Party	Candidate	Votes	%	±%
JKNC	Rachhpal Singh	25,314	45.62%	▼0.99
Independent	Ashok Kumar Sharma	13,894	25.04%	New
JKPDP	Abdul Khaliq	7,742	13.95%	▲7.72
BSP	Raj Kumar	3,851	6.94%	▲6.03
BJP	Bharat Bushan Vaid	1,423	2.56%	▲0.03
INC	Abdul Ghani Kohli	1,017	1.83%	▼41.88
Independent	Mohinder Kour	484	0.87%	New
Independent	Khaliq Hussain	421	0.76%	New
Independent	Ram Parkash Sharma	338	0.61%	New
Margin of victory		11,420	20.58%	▲17.68
Turnout		55,494	73.32%	▲24.66
Registered electors		75,684		▼11.18
JKNC hold		Swing	▼0.99	

=== Assembly Election 2002 ===
2002 Jammu and Kashmir Legislative Assembly election : Kalakote
Party	Candidate	Votes	%	±%
JKNC	Rachpal Singh	19,324	46.61%	▲33.14
INC	Ashok Kumar Sharma	18,124	43.71%	▼1.79
JKPDP	Fallail Singh	2,585	6.23%	New
BJP	Bodh Raj	1,052	2.54%	▼6.27
BSP	Bhan Singh	377	0.91%	New
Margin of victory		1,200	2.89%	▼29.14
Turnout		41,462	48.66%	▼5.77
Registered electors		85,210		▲48.95
JKNC gain from INC		Swing	▲1.10	

=== Assembly Election 1996 ===
1996 Jammu and Kashmir Legislative Assembly election : Kalakote
Party	Candidate	Votes	%	±%
INC	Ashok Kumar Sharma	14,169	45.51%	New
JKNC	Puran Singh Thakur	4,194	13.47%	New
Independent	Gian Singh	4,096	13.15%	New
Independent	Liaqat Ali	3,432	11.02%	New
BJP	Kuldeep Raj Gupta	2,742	8.81%	New
Independent	Kashmir Singh Kanwar	1,573	5.05%	New
JD	Mohammed Yaqub Bhatti	576	1.85%	New
JKNPP	Kamal Gouria	195	0.63%	New
Margin of victory		9,975	32.04%	
Turnout		31,137	54.96%	
Registered electors		57,209		
INC win (new seat)				

== See also ==
- Kalakote
- List of constituencies of Jammu and Kashmir Legislative Assembly
