= Yash Paul Kundal =

Indian politician

President of Young Panthers (JKNPP)
- In office November 2014 – March 2022
- Preceded by: Syed Mohammad Rafiq Shah

Animal and Sheep Husbandry Minister of Jammu and Kashmir
- In office 2002–2008
- Governor: Srinivas Kumar Sinha
- Succeeded by: Governor's rule

Member of Jammu and Kashmir Legislative Assembly
- In office 2002–2014
- Succeeded by: Dr Devinder Kumar Manyal
- Constituency: Samba, Jammu
- Preceded by: Som Nath

Personal details
- Born: Jammu and Kashmir
- Party: Indian National Congress (2022–Present)
- Other political affiliations: Jammu and Kashmir National Panthers Party (1997–2021)
- Education: Jammu University

Yash Paul Kundal is an Indian politician belonging to Indian National Congress in Jammu and Kashmir. He was the state president of Young Panthers, the youth wing of the Jammu and Kashmir National Panthers Party. He has twice been a Member of the Jammu and Kashmir Legislative Assembly, and was the Minister of Animal and Sheep Husbandry from 2002 to 2008. On 8 April 2022, he joined Aam Admi Party.

== Early life ==
Kundal graduated from Jammu University in 1997. Later he completed Masters in Political Science.

== Career ==
Kundal has won two elections for the Jammu and Kashmir Legislative Assembly in Samba, Jammu. After the 2002 Jammu and Kashmir general elections, he served as the Minister of Animal and Sheep Husbandry in the government. After his second election victory in 2008 Jammu and Kashmir elections he was part of the opposition.

In November 2014, he was appointed as the state president of Young Panthers.

As a MLA he supported the Indian Border Security Force's tree planting drive, being their chief guest and planting the first tree in his constituency of Samba. The BSF went on to plant 200,000 saplings.

Kundal, with Harsh Dev Singh, led protests in Jammu on 18 September 2016 against Pakistan after the 2016 Uri attack on an Indian army base, accusing Pakistan of supporting the terrorist attacks.

In October 2016, he accused the police of not pressing appropriate charges against BJP workers who brutally assaulted Bishan Dass, a scheduled caste youth, at Ramnagar Temple. He wanted the case to be registered as attempted murder. He alleged that hate crimes against scheduled caste members had risen in the area as a consequence of recent BJP electoral victories, saying that seven unexplained deaths of scheduled caste members had gone unsolved in the area over a period of 18 months. Previously, in the December 2014 Jammu and Kashmir general elections, he had lost his seat to a BJP candidate.

In February 2020, Kundul was named as the Chairman of the National Panthers Party Working Committee.

== Electoral performance ==
Election	Constituency	Party	Result	Votes %	Opposition Candidate	Opposition Party	Opposition vote %	Ref
2024	Ramgarh, Jammu and Kashmir	INC	Lost	31.02%	Dr. Devinder Kumar Manyal	BJP	51.53%	
2014	Samba	JKNPP	Lost	18.63%	Dr. Devinder Kumar Manyal	BJP	53.08%	
2008	Samba	JKNPP	Won	27.15%	Satwant Kour	BJP	23.45%	
2002	Samba	JKNPP	Won	25.31%	Swarn Lata	INC	23.60%	
