= Padder–Nagseni Assembly constituency =

Constituency of the Jammu and Kashmir legislative assembly in India

Padder–Nagseni
- Constituency No. 50 for the Jammu and Kashmir Legislative Assembly

Constituency details
- Country: India
- State: Jammu and Kashmir
- District: Kishtwar
- Lok Sabha constituency: Udhampur
- Established: 2022
- Reservation: None

Member of Legislative Assembly
- Incumbent Sunil Kumar Sharma
- Party: BJP
- Alliance: NDA
- Elected year: 2024

Padder–Nagseni Assembly constituency is one of the 90 constituencies in the Jammu and Kashmir Legislative Assembly of Jammu and Kashmir a north state of India. Paddar is also part of Udhampur Lok Sabha constituency.

== Members of the Legislative Assembly ==
| Year | Member | Party |
|---|---|---|
| 2024 | Sunil Kumar Sharma | Bharatiya Janata Party |

== Election results ==
=== Assembly Election 2024 ===
2024 Jammu and Kashmir Legislative Assembly election : Padder–Nagseni
| Party | Candidate | Votes | % | ±% |
|---|---|---|---|---|
| BJP | Sunil Kumar Sharma | 17,036 | 50.41% | New |
| JKNC | Pooja Thakur | 15,490 | 45.83% | New |
| JKPDP | Sandesh Kumar | 372 | 1.10% | New |
| Independent | Rakesh Goswami | 209 | 0.62% | New |
| NOTA | None of the Above | 362 | 1.07% | New |
| Margin of victory | | 1,546 | 4.57% | |
| Turnout | | 33,796 | 82.97% | |
| Registered electors | | 40,732 | | |
| BJP win (new seat) | | | | |

== See also ==
- List of constituencies of the Jammu and Kashmir Legislative Assembly
