= Jammu East Assembly constituency =

Constituency of the Jammu and Kashmir legislative assembly in India

Coordinates: 32.710°N 74.926°E

Jammu East
- Constituency No. 76 for the Jammu and Kashmir Legislative Assembly

Constituency details
- Country: India
- State: Jammu and Kashmir
- District: Jammu
- Lok Sabha constituency: Jammu
- Established: 1977

Member of Legislative Assembly
- Incumbent Yudhvir Sethi
- Party: BJP
- Alliance: NDA
- Elected year: 2024

Jammu East Assembly constituency is one of the 90 constituencies in the Jammu and Kashmir Legislative Assembly of Jammu and Kashmir a north state of India. Jammu East is also part of Jammu Lok Sabha constituency.

== Members of the Legislative Assembly ==
Election	Member	Party
1977	Ram Nath Bhalgotra	Janata Party
1983	Om Parkash	Indian National Congress
1987	Chaman Lal	Bharatiya Janata Party
1996	Vaid Vishno Dutt	Bharatiya Janata Party
2002	Yogesh Kumar Sawhney	Indian National Congress
2008	Ashok Kumar Khajuria	Bharatiya Janata Party
2014	Rajesh Gupta	Bharatiya Janata Party
2024	Yudhvir Sethi	Bharatiya Janata Party

== Election results ==
=== Assembly Election 2024 ===
2024 Jammu and Kashmir Legislative Assembly election : Jammu East
Party	Candidate	Votes	%	±%
BJP	Yudhvir Sethi	42,589	61.46%	
INC	Yogesh Sawhney	24,475	35.32%	
Jammu & Kashmir Peoples Democratic Party	Aditya Gupta	448	0.65%	
BSP	Rajesh Gupta	339	0.49%	
NOTA	None of the Above	565	0.82%	
Margin of victory		18,114		
Turnout		69,298		
Registered electors				
BJP hold		Swing		

=== Assembly Election 2014 ===
2014 Jammu and Kashmir Legislative Assembly election : Jammu West
Party	Candidate	Votes	%	±%
BJP	Sat Paul Sharma	69,626	70.63%	▲30.38
INC	Surinder Singh Shingari	18,997	19.27%	▲3.01
JKNC	Dharamveer Singh	4,733	4.80%	▼2.30
JKPDP	Sarv Daman Bhasin	2,419	2.45%	New
NOTA	None of the Above	359	0.36%	New
Margin of victory		50,629	51.36%	▲36.06
Turnout		98,574	64.09%	▲3.24
Registered electors		1,53,794		▲9.88
BJP hold		Swing	▲30.38	

=== Assembly Election 2008 ===
2008 Jammu and Kashmir Legislative Assembly election : Jammu West
Party	Candidate	Votes	%	±%
BJP	Chaman Lal Gupta	34,288	40.26%	▲37.64
Independent	Surinder Singh Shangari	21,251	24.95%	New
INC	Mangat Ram Sharma	13,848	16.26%	▼24.21
JKNC	Chander Mohan Sharma	6,050	7.10%	▼4.95
BSP	Rattan Lal Chargotra	1,791	2.10%	▼2.09
Independent	Ashok Kumar	887	1.04%	New
JKNPP	Mohinder Paul Singh	837	0.98%	New
Margin of victory		13,037	15.31%	▲2.80
Turnout		85,174	60.85%	▲22.17
Registered electors		1,39,965		▼14.49
BJP gain from INC		Swing	▼0.21	

=== Assembly Election 2002 ===
2002 Jammu and Kashmir Legislative Assembly election : Jammu West
Party	Candidate	Votes	%	±%
INC	Mangat Ram Sharma	25,627	40.47%	▲11.57
Independent	Virander Kumar Gupta	17,704	27.96%	New
JKNC	Chander Mohan Sharma	7,631	12.05%	New
SS	Anan Sharma	2,822	4.46%	New
BSP	Raj Kumar	2,652	4.19%	New
BJP	Kavinder Gupta	1,655	2.61%	▼52.00
Independent	Hans Raj Dogra	1,211	1.91%	New
Margin of victory		7,923	12.51%	▼13.20
Turnout		63,327	38.69%	▲5.13
Registered electors		1,63,689		▲127.88
INC gain from BJP		Swing	▼14.14	

=== Assembly By-election 1998 ===
1998 Jammu and Kashmir Legislative Assembly by-election : Jammu West
Party	Candidate	Votes	%	±%
BJP	Ashok Kumar Khajuria	13,164	54.61%	▲8.94
INC	Ved Kumar	6,967	28.90%	▲8.47
JKNC	Rattan Lal Gupta Advocate	2,693	11.17%	New
JD	Dhan Raj Bargotra	464	1.92%	▼2.38
Independent	Vipan Mahajan	353	1.46%	New
Independent	Shri Kant	152	0.63%	New
Margin of victory		6,197	25.71%	▲0.47
Turnout		24,106	33.56%	▼9.19
Registered electors		71,832		▼37.69
BJP hold		Swing	▲8.94	

=== Assembly Election 1996 ===
1996 Jammu and Kashmir Legislative Assembly election : Jammu West
Party	Candidate	Votes	%	±%
BJP	Hans Raj	22,506	45.67%	▲15.04
INC	Yogesh Sawhney	10,068	20.43%	▼28.57
BSP	Pawan Kumar	6,767	13.73%	New
JKNC	Chander Mohan	6,276	12.73%	New
JD	Ayoudhia Kumar	2,123	4.31%	New
Independent	Tilak Raj Mahajan	480	0.97%	New
JKNPP	Udhay Chand	429	0.87%	▼3.86
Margin of victory		12,438	25.24%	▲6.87
Turnout		49,283	43.31%	▼17.72
Registered electors		1,15,286		▲110.79
BJP gain from INC		Swing	▼3.33	

=== Assembly Election 1987 ===
1987 Jammu and Kashmir Legislative Assembly election : Jammu West
Party	Candidate	Votes	%	±%
INC	Mangat Ram Sharma	16,204	48.99%	▼17.38
BJP	Chander Mohan Sharma	10,130	30.63%	▲13.39
Independent	Bishwa Nath	3,131	9.47%	New
JKNPP	Udhay Chand	1,566	4.73%	New
JP	Sham Sunder	585	1.77%	New
Independent	Rattan Lal	382	1.16%	New
Independent	Vijay Kumar Malhotra	343	1.04%	New
Margin of victory		6,074	18.37%	▼30.77
Turnout		33,073	61.52%	▲9.91
Registered electors		54,692		▲10.10
INC hold		Swing	▼17.38	

=== Assembly Election 1983 ===
1983 Jammu and Kashmir Legislative Assembly election : Jammu West
Party	Candidate	Votes	%	±%
INC	Rangil Singh	16,672	66.38%	▲28.39
BJP	Tilak Raj Sharma	4,331	17.24%	New
Independent	Udhey Chand	1,824	7.26%	New
JKNC	Sudershan Lal Mahajan	1,210	4.82%	▲1.40
Independent	Om Parkash S/O Sh. Beli Ram	309	1.23%	New
Independent	Om Parkash S/O Sh. Dhani Ram	264	1.05%	New
Independent	Jatinder Paul	225	0.90%	New
Margin of victory		12,341	49.13%	▲32.35
Turnout		25,117	51.65%	▼2.35
Registered electors		49,676		▲31.38
INC gain from JP		Swing	▲11.61	

=== Assembly Election 1977 ===
1977 Jammu and Kashmir Legislative Assembly election : Jammu West
Party	Candidate	Votes	%	±%
JP	Harbans Lal Bhagotra	10,956	54.76%	New
INC	Romesh Chander	7,599	37.98%	New
JKNC	Rattan Lal Gupta	684	3.42%	New
Independent	Som Nath	333	1.66%	New
Independent	Master Modh Sharif	267	1.33%	New
Margin of victory		3,357	16.78%	
Turnout		20,006	53.73%	
Registered electors		37,810		
JP win (new seat)				

== See also ==
- Jammu
- List of constituencies of Jammu and Kashmir Legislative Assembly
