= Chanapora Assembly constituency =

Constituency of the Jammu and Kashmir legislative assembly in India

Chanapora
- Constituency No. 23 for the Jammu and Kashmir Legislative Assembly

Constituency details
- Country: India
- State: Jammu and Kashmir
- District: Srinagar
- Lok Sabha constituency: Srinagar
- Established: 2022
- Reservation: None

Member of Legislative Assembly
- Incumbent Mushtaq Guroo
- Party: Jammu & Kashmir National Conference
- Elected year: 2024

Chanapora is one of the 90 constituencies in the Jammu and Kashmir Legislative Assembly of Jammu and Kashmir a north state of India. Chanapora is also part of Srinagar Lok Sabha constituency.

== Members of Legislative Assembly ==
Year	Member	Party
2024	Mushtaq Guroo	Jammu & Kashmir National Conference

== Election results ==
=== Assembly Election 2024 ===
2024 Jammu and Kashmir Legislative Assembly election : Chanapora
Party	Candidate	Votes	%	±%
JKNC	Mushtaq Guroo	13,717	53.94%	New
JKAP	Syed Mohammad Altaf Bukhari	8,029	31.57%	New
JKPDP	Mohammed Iqbal Trumboo	1,450	5.70%	New
BJP	Hilal Ahmad Wani	722	2.84%	New
Independent	Jibran Dar	598	2.35%	New
NOTA	None of the Above	355	1.40%	New
Independent	Sheeban Ashai	225	0.88%	New
Independent	Showkat Ahmad Bhat	212	0.83%	New
Margin of victory		5,688	22.37%	
Turnout		25,431	29.77%	
Registered electors		85,431		
JKNC win (new seat)				

== See also ==
- List of constituencies of the Jammu and Kashmir Legislative Assembly
