= Anantnag West Assembly constituency =

Constituency of the Jammu and Kashmir legislative assembly in India

Anantnag West
- Constituency No. 43 for the Jammu and Kashmir Legislative Assembly

Constituency details
- Country: India
- State: Jammu and Kashmir
- District: Anantnag
- Lok Sabha constituency: Anantnag-Rajouri
- Established: 2024
- Reservation: None

Member of Legislative Assembly
- Incumbent Abdul Majeed Bhat
- Party: JKNC
- Elected year: 2024

Anantnag West is a constituency of the Jammu and Kashmir Legislative Assembly. It is also part of Anantnag-Rajouri lok sabha constituency. As of 2024, its representative is Abdul Majeed Bhat of the Jammu & Kashmir National Conference party.

== Members of the Legislative Assembly ==
Election	Name	Party
2024	Abdul Majeed Bhat	Jammu & Kashmir National Conference

== Election results ==
=== 2024 ===
2024 Jammu and Kashmir Legislative Assembly election: Anantnag West
Party	Candidate	Votes	%	±%
JKNC	Abdul Majeed Bhat	25,135	40.58	
JKPDP	Abdul Gaffar Sofi	14,700	23.74	
BJP	Mohammad Rafiq Wani	6,574	10.61	
DPAP	Bilal Ahmad Deva	6,530	10.54	
Independent	Aaqib Mushtaq Ganie	2,877	4.65	
Independent	Fayaz Ahmad Khanday	1,862	3.01	
JD(U)	Gul Mohammad Bhat	1,546	2.50	
NOTA	None of the Above	1,382	2.23	
Independent	Gulshan Akhter	899	1.45	
JKNPP	Mohammad Rafiq Wani	428	0.69	
Majority		10,435	16.85	
Turnout		61,933	49.15	
JKNC win (new seat)				
