= Abdul Ghani Kohli =

Indian politician

Abdul Ghani Kohli (born 1943) is an Indian politician from Jammu and Kashmir. He was a member of Jammu and Kashmir Legislative Assembly elected in 2014 from Kalakote in Rajouri district as a candidate of Bharatiya Janata Party. He defeated Rashpal Singh of National Conference by 6,178 votes. He became the first Muslim MLA to win on BJP ticket in Jammu and Kashmir. The BJP replaced him by Thakur Randhir Singh ji to contest the 2024 Assembly election from the new Kalakote-Sunderbani constituency, who won.

== Education ==
Kohli obtained a bachelor's degree in civil engineering from the University of Kashmir in 1968.
