= Central Shalteng Assembly constituency =

Constituency of the Jammu and Kashmir legislative assembly in India

Central Shalteng
- Constituency No. 26 for the Jammu and Kashmir Legislative Assembly

Constituency details
- Country: India
- State: Jammu and Kashmir
- District: Srinagar
- Lok Sabha constituency: Srinagar
- Established: 2022

Member of Legislative Assembly
- Incumbent Tariq Hameed Karra
- Party: Indian National Congress
- Elected year: 2024

Central Shalteng is one of the 90 constituencies in the Jammu and Kashmir Legislative Assembly of Jammu and Kashmir a north state of India. Shalteng is also part of Srinagar Lok Sabha constituency.

== Members of Legislative Assembly ==
Year	Member	Party
2024	Tariq Hameed Karra	Indian National Congress

== Election results ==
=== Assembly Election 2024 ===
2024 Jammu and Kashmir Legislative Assembly election : Central Shalteng
Party	Candidate	Votes	%	±%
INC	Tariq Hameed Karra	18,933	55.86%	New
Independent	Mohammed Irfan Shah	4,538	13.39%	New
Independent	Noor Mohammad Sheikh	4,103	12.11%	New
JKPDP	Abdul Qayoom Bhat	2,730	8.06%	New
JKAP	Zaffer Habib Dar	886	2.61%	New
NOTA	None of the Above	821	2.42%	New
Independent	Adil Hussain Dar	357	1.05%	New
Independent	Indomeet Singh	350	1.03%	New
JKANC	Riyaz Ahmad Mir	295	0.87%	New
Independent	Muddasir Rashid Bazaz	203	0.60%	New
Margin of victory		14,395	42.47%	
Turnout		33,891	31.45%	
Registered electors		1,07,770		
INC win (new seat)				

== See also ==
- List of constituencies of the Jammu and Kashmir Legislative Assembly
