= Bharat Bhushan (politician) =

Indian politician

Dr. Bharat Bhushan

Member of Jammu and Kashmir Legislative Assembly
- Incumbent
- Assumed office 8 October 2024
- Preceded by: Rajiv Jasrotia
- Constituency: Kathua

Personal details
- Party: Bharatiya Janata Party
- Profession: Politician

Dr. Bharat Bhushan is an Indian politician from Jammu & Kashmir. He is a Member of the Jammu & Kashmir Legislative Assembly from 2024, representing Kathua Assembly constituency as a Member of the Bharatiya Janta Party.

== Electoral performance ==
Election	Constituency	Party	Result	Votes %	Opposition Candidate	Opposition Party	Opposition vote %	Ref
2024	Kathua	BJP	Won	55.19%	Sandeep Majotra	BSP	40.64%	

== See also ==
- 2024 Jammu & Kashmir Legislative Assembly election
- Jammu and Kashmir Legislative Assembly
