= Samba Assembly constituency =

Constituency of the Jammu and Kashmir Legislative Assembly

Coordinates: 32.56°N 75.11°E

Samba
- Constituency No. 70 for the Jammu and Kashmir Legislative Assembly

Constituency details
- Country: India
- State: Jammu and Kashmir
- District: Samba
- Lok Sabha constituency: Jammu
- Established: 1962

Member of Legislative Assembly
- Incumbent Surjeet Singh Slathia
- Party: BJP
- Alliance: NDA
- Elected year: 2024

Samba Assembly constituency is one of the 90 constituencies in the Jammu and Kashmir Legislative Assembly of Jammu and Kashmir a north state of India. Samba is also part of Jammu Lok Sabha constituency.

== Members of the Legislative Assembly ==
Election	Member	Party
1962	K. Sagar Singh	Jammu & Kashmir National Conference
1967	P. Nand	Indian National Congress
1972	Gouri Shankar	Indian National Congress
1977	Dhayan Singh	Independent politician
1983	Parkash Sharma	Indian National Congress
1987	Parkash Sharma	Indian National Congress
1996	Som Nath	Bahujan Samaj Party
2002	Yash Paul Kundal	Jammu and Kashmir National Panthers Party
2008	Yash Paul Kundal	Jammu and Kashmir National Panthers Party
2014	Dr. Devinder Kumar Manyal	Bharatiya Janata Party
2024	Surjeet Singh Slathia	Bharatiya Janata Party

== Election results ==
=== Assembly Election 2024 ===
2024 Jammu and Kashmir Legislative Assembly election : Samba
Party	Candidate	Votes	%	±%
BJP	Surjeet Singh Slathia	43,182	61.74%	▲8.66
Independent	Ravinder Singh	12,873	18.41%	New
DPAP	Vinod Kumar	4,289	6.13%	New
INC	Krishan Dev Singh	3,628	5.19%	▼8.93
BSP	Baldev Raj	1,309	1.87%	▼2.46
Independent	Bhanu Partap Singh	1,140	1.63%	New
JKAP	Lovely Mangol	901	1.29%	New
Independent	Reena Choudhary	544	0.78%	New
ASP(KR)	Raj Kumar	488	0.70%	New
NOTA	None of the Above	330	0.47%	▼0.34
Margin of victory		30,309	43.34%	▲8.88
Turnout		69,939	76.79%	▲1.19
Registered electors		91,080		▲7.26
BJP hold		Swing	▲8.66	

=== Assembly Election 2014 ===
2014 Jammu and Kashmir Legislative Assembly election : Samba
Party	Candidate	Votes	%	±%
BJP	Dr. Devinder Kumar Manyal	34,075	53.08%	▲29.63
JKNPP	Yash Paul Kundal	11,957	18.63%	▼8.52
INC	Subhash Chander	9,063	14.12%	▼5.76
JKPDP	Sunny Sangral	2,971	4.63%	▲3.63
BSP	Som Nath	2,779	4.33%	▼8.00
JKNC	Satwant Kaur	2,220	3.46%	▼8.34
NOTA	None of the Above	524	0.82%	New
Margin of victory		22,118	34.45%	▲30.76
Turnout		64,195	75.60%	▲3.08
Registered electors		84,916		▲14.25
BJP gain from JKNPP		Swing	▲25.94	

=== Assembly Election 2008 ===
2008 Jammu and Kashmir Legislative Assembly election : Samba
Party	Candidate	Votes	%	±%
JKNPP	Yash Paul Kundal	14,631	27.15%	▲1.84
BJP	Satwant Kour	12,642	23.45%	▲9.36
INC	Subhash Chander	10,714	19.88%	▼3.72
BSP	Som Nath	6,647	12.33%	▼9.06
JKNC	Som Nath	6,361	11.80%	▼2.08
Independent	Kartar Chand	1,235	2.29%	New
JKPDP	Anita Devi	536	0.99%	▲0.37
Margin of victory		1,989	3.69%	▲1.99
Turnout		53,899	72.52%	▲14.09
Registered electors		74,325		▼0.81
JKNPP hold		Swing	▲1.84	

=== Assembly Election 2002 ===
2002 Jammu and Kashmir Legislative Assembly election : Samba
Party	Candidate	Votes	%	±%
JKNPP	Yash Paul Kundal	11,079	25.31%	New
INC	Swarn Lata	10,333	23.60%	▼0.53
BSP	Som Nath	9,367	21.40%	▼20.69
BJP	Subhash Chander	6,172	14.10%	▼2.30
JKNC	Som Nath	6,077	13.88%	New
JKPDP	Prabh Dayal	273	0.62%	New
NCP	Bishan Dass	262	0.60%	New
Margin of victory		746	1.70%	▼16.25
Turnout		43,780	58.47%	▲3.27
Registered electors		74,934		▲23.29
JKNPP gain from BSP		Swing	▼16.78	

=== Assembly Election 1996 ===
1996 Jammu and Kashmir Legislative Assembly election : Samba
Party	Candidate	Votes	%	±%
BSP	Som Nath	14,107	42.08%	New
INC	Swaran Lata	8,090	24.13%	▼3.21
BJP	Parma Nand	5,498	16.40%	▼2.81
Independent	Subhash Chander	2,249	6.71%	New
JD	Tilak Raj Atri	1,884	5.62%	New
Independent	Narsingh Dyal	1,094	3.26%	New
Independent	Khazan Chand	422	1.26%	New
Margin of victory		6,017	17.95%	▲10.24
Turnout		33,521	56.31%	▼13.19
Registered electors		60,779		▲10.07
BSP gain from INC		Swing	▲14.74	

=== Assembly Election 1987 ===
1987 Jammu and Kashmir Legislative Assembly election : Samba
Party	Candidate	Votes	%	±%
INC	Parkash Sharma	10,318	27.34%	▼17.32
Independent	Hoshiar Singh	7,407	19.63%	New
BJP	Satya Pal	7,248	19.21%	▲6.78
Independent	Som Nath	7,159	18.97%	New
Independent	Balraj Singh	2,241	5.94%	New
Independent	Mohammed Din	1,060	2.81%	New
Independent	Gurnam Singh	865	2.29%	New
JKNPP	Sudarshan Sambyal	601	1.59%	New
INS(SCS)	Dhanantar Singh	329	0.87%	New
Margin of victory		2,911	7.71%	▼15.80
Turnout		37,736	70.20%	▲5.59
Registered electors		55,218		▲14.51
INC hold		Swing	▼17.32	

=== Assembly Election 1983 ===
1983 Jammu and Kashmir Legislative Assembly election : Samba
Party	Candidate	Votes	%	±%
INC	Parkash Sharma	13,515	44.66%	▲25.59
JKNC	Surjeet Singh	6,400	21.15%	▲7.22
BJP	Satya Pal	3,760	12.42%	New
Independent	Persidh Singh	1,354	4.47%	New
LKD	Manshi Ram	1,269	4.19%	New
Independent	Babu Ram	1,166	3.85%	New
JP	Mohinder	839	2.77%	▼9.86
JKNC	Bhopinder Singh	520	1.72%	▼12.21
Independent	Balraj Singh	425	1.40%	New
Independent	Kartar Singh	361	1.19%	New
Independent	Dhorab Singh	184	0.61%	New
Margin of victory		7,115	23.51%	▲16.97
Turnout		30,262	64.54%	▲2.11
Registered electors		48,223		▲17.95
INC gain from Independent		Swing	▲19.05	

=== Assembly Election 1977 ===
1977 Jammu and Kashmir Legislative Assembly election : Samba
Party	Candidate	Votes	%	±%
Independent	Dhayan Singh	6,349	25.61%	New
INC	Harbans Singh	4,728	19.07%	▼35.84
JKNC	Rawel Singh	3,453	13.93%	New
JP	Gulchain Singh	3,131	12.63%	New
Independent	Puran Singh	1,564	6.31%	New
Independent	Gianchand	1,370	5.53%	New
Independent	Rajinder Nath	1,300	5.24%	New
Independent	Babu Nath	1,128	4.55%	New
Independent	Mangat Ram	725	2.92%	New
Independent	Swaran Singh	461	1.86%	New
Independent	Harsant Singh	186	0.75%	New
Margin of victory		1,621	6.54%	▼15.08
Turnout		24,792	62.22%	▲2.44
Registered electors		40,884		▲34.70
Independent gain from INC		Swing	▼29.30	

=== Assembly Election 1972 ===
1972 Jammu and Kashmir Legislative Assembly election : Samba
Party	Candidate	Votes	%	±%
INC	Gouri Shankar	9,700	54.91%	▲8.32
ABJS	Gian Chand	5,882	33.30%	▲4.52
Independent	Munshi Ram	2,082	11.79%	New
Margin of victory		3,818	21.61%	▲3.79
Turnout		17,664	60.07%	▼11.46
Registered electors		30,352		▲18.00
INC hold		Swing		

=== Assembly Election 1967 ===
1967 Jammu and Kashmir Legislative Assembly election : Samba
Party	Candidate	Votes	%	±%
INC	P. Nand	8,349	46.60%	New
ABJS	G. Chand	5,156	28.78%	New
Democratic National Conference	P. Singh	2,969	16.57%	New
JKNC	M. Ram	1,443	8.05%	▼35.66
Margin of victory		3,193	17.82%	▲13.34
Turnout		17,917	72.54%	▼3.62
Registered electors		25,722		▲9.93
INC gain from JKNC		Swing	▲2.89	

=== Assembly Election 1962 ===
1962 Jammu and Kashmir Legislative Assembly election : Samba
Party	Candidate	Votes	%	±%
JKNC	K. Sagar Singh	7,495	43.71%	New
JPP	Dhyan Singh	6,727	39.23%	New
Harijan Mandal	Ram Dass	1,334	7.78%	New
Independent	Fateh Mohammed	1,039	6.06%	New
Independent	Shanta Bharti	551	3.21%	New
Margin of victory		768	4.48%	
Turnout		17,146	73.36%	
Registered electors		23,398		
JKNC win (new seat)				

== See also ==
- Samba
- List of constituencies of Jammu and Kashmir Legislative Assembly
