= Zainapora Assembly constituency =

Zainapora
- Constituency No. 36 for the Jammu and Kashmir Legislative Assembly

Constituency details
- Country: India
- State: Jammu and Kashmir
- District: Shopian
- Lok Sabha constituency: Anantnag-Rajouri
- Established: 2022

Member of Legislative Assembly
- Incumbent Showkat Hussain
- Elected year: 2024

Zainapora is one of the 90 constituencies in the Jammu and Kashmir Legislative Assembly of Jammu and Kashmir a north state of India. Zainapora is also part of Anantnag-Rajouri Lok Sabha constituency.

== Members of the Legislative Assembly ==
Election	Member	Party
2024	Showkat Hussain Ganie	Jammu and Kashmir National Conference

== Election results ==
=== Assembly Election 2024 ===
2024 Jammu and Kashmir Legislative Assembly election : Zainapora
Party	Candidate	Votes	%	±%
JKNC	Showkat Hussain Ganie	28,251	46.42%	New
Independent	Aijaz Ahmad Mir	15,018	24.67%	New
JKPDP	Ghulam Mohi-Ud-Din Wani	6,209	10.20%	New
JKAP	Gowhar Hussain Wani	5,163	8.48%	New
Independent	Mohammed Suhaib Bhat	1,152	1.89%	New
Independent	Umar Hamid Malla	731	1.20%	New
Garib Democratic Party	Mashooq Ahmad Dar	629	1.03%	New
NOTA	None of the Above	2,082	3.42%	New
Margin of victory		13,233	21.74%	
Turnout		60,864	56.10%	
Registered electors		1,08,493		
JKNC win (new seat)				
