= Showkat Hussain Ganie =

Indian politician

Member of Jammu and Kashmir Legislative Assembly
- Incumbent
- Assumed office 8 October 2024
- Constituency: Zainapora

Personal details
- Party: Jammu & Kashmir National Conference
- Profession: Politician

Showkat Hussain Ganie is an Indian politician, serving as a member of Jammu and Kashmir legislative assembly. A member of Jammu and Kashmir National Conference, he represents Zainapora assembly constituency since October 2024. He was elected during the 2024 assembly elections.

He has also served as a member of the Jammu and Kashmir state legislative council (MLC) twice.

== Members of the Legislative Assembly ==
Election	Member	Party
2024	Showkat Hussain Ganie	Jammu and Kashmir National Conference

== Election results ==
=== Assembly Election 2024 ===
2024 Jammu and Kashmir Legislative Assembly election : Zainapora
Party	Candidate	Votes	%	±%
JKNC	Showkat Hussain Ganie	28,251	46.42%	New
Independent	Aijaz Ahmad Mir	15,018	24.67%	New
JKPDP	Ghulam Mohi-Ud-Din Wani	6,209	10.20%	New
JKAP	Gowhar Hussain Wani	5,163	8.48%	New
NOTA	None of the Above	2,082	3.42%	New
Independent	Mohammed Suhaib Bhat	1,152	1.89%	New
Independent	Umar Hamid Malla	731	1.20%	New
Garib Democratic Party	Mashooq Ahmad Dar	629	1.03%	New
Liberal Democratic Party	Abdul Rehman Bhat	578	0.95%	New
Independent	Mohammad Yousuf Mir	538	0.88%	New
Jammu and Kashmir Nationalist People's Front	Nazir Ahmed Najar	513	0.84%	New
Margin of victory		13,233	21.74%	
Turnout		60,864	56.10%	
Registered electors		1,08,493		
JKNC win (new seat)				
