= Satish Kumar Sharma =

Indian politician

Shri Satish Kumar Sharma is a politician from the Indian National Congress party who is a Member of the Parliament of India, representing Uttarkhand in the Rajya Sabha, the upper house of the Indian Parliament.
