= Surjeet Singh Slathia =

Indian politician

Deputy Leader of the Opposition in the Jammu and Kashmir Legislative Assembly
- Incumbent
- Assumed office 5 June 2025 Serving with Pawan Gupta
- Leader: Sunil Kumar Sharma

Member of Jammu and Kashmir Legislative Assembly
- Incumbent
- Assumed office 8 October 2024
- Preceded by: Devinder Kumar Manyal
- Constituency: Samba

Personal details
- Party: Bharatiya Janata Party
- Profession: Politician

Surjeet Singh Slathia is an Indian politician from Jammu & Kashmir. He is a currently serving as the deputy leader of opposition alongwith Pawan Gupta in the Jammu and Kashmir Legislative Assembly under Sunil Sharma. He was elected in 2024, representing Samba Assembly constituency as a Member of the Bharatiya Janta Party.

== See also ==
- 2024 Jammu & Kashmir Legislative Assembly election
- Jammu and Kashmir Legislative Assembly
