= Javaid Riyaz =

Indian politician

Member of Jammu and Kashmir Legislative Assembly
- Incumbent
- Assumed office 8 October 2024
- Preceded by: Imran Raza Ansari
- Constituency: Pattan

Personal details
- Political party: Jammu & Kashmir National Conference
- Profession: Politician

Javaid Riyaz is an Indian politician from Jammu and Kashmir. He is a member of the Jammu and Kashmir Legislative Assembly from 2024, representing Pattan Assembly constituency as a Member of the Jammu & Kashmir National Conference party.

== See also ==
- 2024 Jammu and Kashmir Legislative Assembly election
- Jammu and Kashmir Legislative Assembly
