= Udhampur West Assembly constituency =

Constituency of the Jammu and Kashmir legislative assembly in India

Udhampur West
- Constituency No. 59 for the Jammu and Kashmir Legislative Assembly

Constituency details
- Country: India
- State: Jammu and Kashmir
- District: Udhampur
- Lok Sabha constituency: Udhampur
- Established: 2022
- Reservation: None

Member of Legislative Assembly
- Incumbent Pawan Kumar Gupta
- Party: BJP
- Alliance: NDA
- Elected year: 2024

Udhampur West Assembly constituency is one of the 90 constituencies in the Jammu and Kashmir Legislative Assembly of Jammu and Kashmir a north state of India. Udhampur is also part of Udhampur Lok Sabha constituency.

== Members of Legislative Assembly ==
Year	Member	Party
2024	Pawan Kumar Gupta	Bharatiya Janata Party

== Election results ==
=== Assembly Election 2024 ===
2024 Jammu and Kashmir Legislative Assembly election : Udhampur West
Party	Candidate	Votes	%	±%
BJP	Pawan Kumar Gupta	47,164	52.06%	New
INC	Sumeet Magotra	26,412	29.15%	New
Independent	Jasvir Singh	12,556	13.86%	New
Jammu and Kashmir National Panthers Party (Bhim)	Tranter Singh	637	0.70%	New
NOTA	None of the Above	1,290	1.42%	New
Margin of victory		20,752	22.90%	
Turnout		90,603	78.34%	
Registered electors		1,15,655		
BJP win (new seat)				

== See also ==
- List of constituencies of the Jammu and Kashmir Legislative Assembly
