= Rajeev Kumar (Jammu & Kashmir politician) =

Indian politician

Member of Jammu and Kashmir Legislative Assembly
- Incumbent
- Assumed office 8 October 2024
- Preceded by: Kamal Verma
- Constituency: Bishnah

Personal details
- Party: Bharatiya Janata Party
- Profession: Politician

Rajeev Kumar is an Indian politician from Jammu & Kashmir. He is a Member of the Jammu & Kashmir Legislative Assembly from 2024, representing Bishnah Assembly constituency as a Member of the Bharatiya Janta Party.

== Electoral performance ==
| Election | Constituency | Party | Result | Votes % | Opposition Candidate | Opposition Party | Opposition vote % | Ref |
|---|---|---|---|---|---|---|---|---|
| 2024 | Bishnah | BJP | Won | 56.48% | Neeraj Kundan | INC | 39.96% | |

== See also ==
- 2024 Jammu & Kashmir Legislative Assembly election
- Jammu and Kashmir Legislative Assembly
