= Jasrota Assembly constituency =

Constituency of the Jammu and Kashmir Legislative Assembly

Jasrota
- Constituency No. 66 for the Jammu and Kashmir Legislative Assembly

Constituency details
- Country: India
- State: Jammu and Kashmir
- District: Kathua
- Lok Sabha constituency: Udhampur
- Established: 1962
- Reservation: SC

Member of Legislative Assembly
- Incumbent Rajiv Jasrotia
- Party: BJP
- Alliance: NDA
- Elected year: 2024

Jasrota Assembly constituency is one of the 90 assembly constituencies in the Jammu and Kashmir Legislative Assembly.

== Members of the Legislative Assembly ==
Election	Name	Party
2024	Rajiv Jasrotia	Bharatiya Janata Party

== Election results ==
=== Assembly Election 2024 ===
2024 Jammu and Kashmir Legislative Assembly election : Jasrota
Party	Candidate	Votes	%	±%
BJP	Rajiv Jasrotia	34,157	51.94%	New
Independent	Brijeshwar Singh	21,737	33.05%	New
BSP	Raman Kumar	3,302	5.02%	New
INC	Balbir Singh	3,219	4.89%	New
Independent	Amrish Jasrotia	1,755	2.67%	New
ASP(KR)	Jaswinder Singh	926	1.41%	New
NOTA	None of the Above	456	0.69%	New
Margin of victory		12,420	18.88%	
Turnout		65,768	75.81%	
Registered electors		86,753		
BJP win (new seat)				
