= Pirzada Farooq Ahmed Shah =

Indian politician

Member of the Jammu and Kashmir Legislative Assembly
- Incumbent
- Assumed office 2024
- Constituency: Gulmarg

Personal details
- Born: May 1961 (age 65) Jammu and Kashmir, India
- Party: Jammu & Kashmir National Conference
- Education: National Institute of Technology, Srinagar
- Profession: Politician; Former Indian Administrative Service officer

Pirzada Farooq Ahmed Shah (born May 1961) is a Kashmiri politician and former Indian Administrative Service (IAS) officer. He was elected as a Member of the Jammu and Kashmir Legislative Assembly from the Gulmarg constituency in 2024.

Prior to entering electoral politics, he served as an officer of the Indian Administrative Service in the Jammu and Kashmir cadre and resigned from service in 2019.

== Early life and education ==
He was born in Hardushoora. Shah holds a Bachelor of Engineering (Civil Engineering) degree from the National Institute of Technology (NIT), Srinagar.

== Civil service career ==
Shah joined government service in 1987 and later served as an IAS officer in Jammu and Kashmir. During his administrative career, he held senior positions including Secretary to the Government in departments such as Public Health Engineering, Irrigation and Flood Control, Disaster Management, School Education, and Tourism.

He also served in district-level administrative roles including District Magistrate and District Development Commissioner in Srinagar and Anantnag.

== Political career ==
After resigning from the IAS in 2019, Shah entered active politics. In 2024, he was elected to the Jammu and Kashmir Legislative Assembly from the Gulmarg constituency.

== See also ==
- 2024 Jammu and Kashmir Legislative Assembly election
- Jammu and Kashmir Legislative Assembly
