= Majeed Bhat Laram =

Indian politician, social worker and businessman

Abdul Majeed Bhat
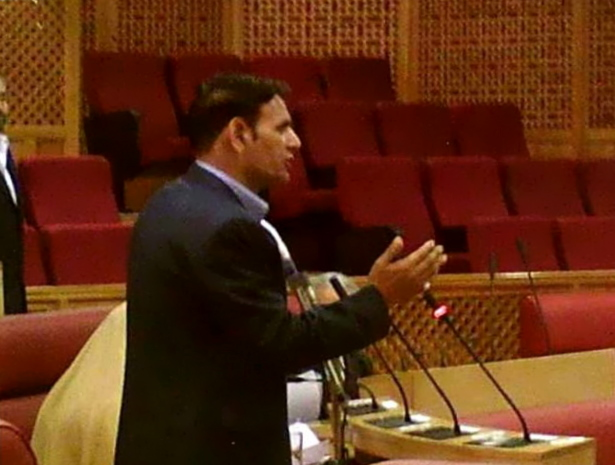
- Abdul Majeed Bhat in J&K Legislative council

Member of legislative assembly of Jammu and Kashmir
- Incumbent
- Assumed office 2024
- In office 2014–2018
- Governor: Narinder Nath Vohra
- Preceded by: President's Rule
- Succeeded by: President's Rule

Personal details
- Born: 10 March 1967 (age 59) Laram, Anantnag, Jammu and Kashmir, India
- Website: www.ambhat.com

Abdul Majeed Bhat Laram (born 10 March 1967), also known as Majeed Larmi, is an Indian politician and businessman from the union territory of Jammu and Kashmir. He is a Member of Legislative Assembly from the Anantnag West Assembly constituency in Anantnag district. Previously, he was an MLA from Hom Shali Bugh Assembly constituency of Kulgam district.

== Early life and education ==
Bhat was born in Larm village in South Kashmir's erstwhile Anantnag district. He completed his bachelor's degree from Degree College for Boys, Khanabal, Anantnag and later did law at Kashmir University.

== Career ==
Bhat won from Hom Shali Bugh Assembly constituency in the 2014 Jammu and Kashmir Legislative Assembly election representing the Jammu and Kashmir National conference. He polled 11,406 votes and defeated his nearest rival, Abdul Gaffar Sofi of JKPDP, by a margin of 1,269 votes. In the 2024 Jammu and Kashmir Legislative Assembly election, he won from Anantnag West assembly constituency by defeating Abdul Gaffar Sofi of JKPDP, by a margin of 10,435 votes.
