= Pawan Kumar Gupta =

Indian politician

Deputy Leader of the Opposition in the Jammu and Kashmir Legislative Assembly
- Incumbent
- Assumed office 5 June 2025 Serving with Surjeet Singh Slathia
- Leader: Sunil Kumar Sharma

Member of the Jammu and Kashmir Legislative Assembly
- Incumbent
- Assumed office 2024
- Preceded by: Constituency established
- Constituency: Udhampur West
- In office 2014–2018
- Succeeded by: Constituency abolished
- Constituency: Udhampur

Personal details
- Party: Bharatiya Janata Party

Pawan Kumar Gupta is an Indian political leader from Union Territory of Jammu and Kashmir. Gupta is the Deputy Leader of Opposition alongwith Surjeet Singh (Dy. LoP) in the Jammu and Kashmir Legislative Assembly under Sunil Sharma. He is a member (MLA) of the Jammu and Kashmir Legislative Assembly from the Udhampur West constituency in Udhampur district as a member of BJP.

He has served as the Minister of State (MoS) - ‘Finance’ & ‘IT’ while he was member of Legislative Assembly of erstwhile State of Jammu and Kashmir from Udhampur Vidhan Sabha before the delimitation of the union territory of Jammu and Kashmir.

== Electoral performance ==
Election	Constituency	Party	Result	Votes %	Opposition Candidate	Opposition Party	Opposition vote %	Ref
2024	Udhampur West	BJP	Won	52.06%	Sumeet Magotra	INC	29.15%	
2014	Udhampur	Independent	Won	42.57%	Balwant Singh Mankotia	JKNPP	25.36%	
2008	Udhampur	BJP	Lost	31.61%	Balwant Singh Mankotia	JKNPP	35.49%	
2002	Udhampur	BJP	Lost	24.10%	Balwant Singh Mankotia	JKNPP	40.39%	
