= Randhir Singh (politician) =

Indian politician

Member of Jammu and Kashmir Legislative Assembly
- Incumbent
- Assumed office 8 October 2024
- Constituency: Kalakote–Sunderbani

Personal details
- Party: Bharatiya Janata Party
- Profession: Politician

Randhir Singh (born 1966) is an Indian politician from Jammu and Kashmir. He is a member of the Jammu and Kashmir Legislative Assembly from Kalakote–Sunderbani Assembly constituency representing the Bharatiya Janta Party.

== Early life and education ==
Singh is from Kalakote, Rajouri District, Jammu and Kashmir. He is the son of Gian Singh.

== Career ==
Singh won from Kalakote Sunderbani Assembly constituency representing Bharatiya Janata Party in the 2024 Jammu and Kashmir Legislative Assembly election. He polled 35,010 votes and defeated his nearest rival which was his nephew Yashu Vardhan Singh of Jammu and Kashmir National Conference, by a margin of 14,409 votes.

== See also ==
- 2024 Jammu & Kashmir Legislative Assembly election
- Jammu and Kashmir Legislative Assembly
