= Javid Hassan Baig =

Indian politician (born 1964)

Javid Hassan Baig (born 1964) is an Indian politician from Jammu and Kashmir. He is an MLA from Baramulla Assembly constituency in Baramulla district. He won the 2014 Jammu and Kashmir Legislative Assembly election representing the Jammu and Kashmir People's Democratic Party and the 2024 Jammu and Kashmir Legislative Assembly election as a member of the Jammu and Kashmir National Conference.

== Early life and education ==
Baig is from Baramulla, Jammu and Kashmir. He is the son of Mohammad Hassan Baig. His wife is a government teacher. He completed his B.A. at a college affiliated with University of Kashmir, Srinagar.

== Career ==
Baig won from Baramulla Assembly constituency representing the Jammu and Kashmir People's Democratic Party in the 2014 Jammu and Kashmir Legislative Assembly election. He polled 14,418 votes and defeated his nearest rival, Gh. Hassan Rahi of the Jammu and Kashmir National Conference, by a margin of 7,017 votes. In July 2018, he rebelled against the party but later in September 2018, he rejoined the JKPDP fold. He again quit the party and joined the National Conference, winning in 2024 from the Baramulla assembly and defeating his closest rival and independent candidate Shoaib Nabi Lone by a margin of 11,773 votes.

== Electoral performance ==
Election	Constituency	Party	Result	Votes %	Opposition Candidate	Opposition Party	Opposition vote %	Ref
2024	Baramulla	JKNC	Won	32.75%	Shoaib Nabi Lone	Independent	15.63%	
2014	Baramulla	JKPDP	Won	43.75%	Ghulam Hassan Rahi	JKNC	22.46%	
