= Rajiv Jasrotia =

Indian politician

Member of the Jammu and Kashmir Legislative Assembly
- Incumbent
- Assumed office 2024
- Constituency: Jasrota
- In office 2014–2019
- Succeeded by: Sandeep Majotra
- Constituency: Kathua

Personal details
- Born: 26 October 1973 (age 52)
- Party: Bharatiya Janata Party

Rajiv Jasrotia (born 26 October 1973) is an Indian politician and member of the Bharatiya Janata Party. Jasrotia is a member of the Jammu and Kashmir Legislative Assembly from the Jasrota constituency since 2024 and was formerly elected from Kathua constituency in 2014.. He was the Minister for Forest, Environment, and Ecpology of Jammu and Kashmir in a PDP-BJP coalition government for a short period of over weeks until the coalition failed on 19 June 2018. He courted controversy after participating in a rally in support of the accused in the kathua rape case.

== Electoral performance ==
Election	Constituency	Party	Result	Votes %	Opposition Candidate	Opposition Party	Opposition vote %	Ref
2024	Jasrota	BJP	Won	51.94%	Brijeshwar Singh	Independent	33.05%	
2014	Kathua	BJP	Won	39.11%	Som Raj Majotra	BSP	31.65%	
