= Ramgarh, Jammu and Kashmir Assembly constituency =

Constituency of the Jammu and Kashmir legislative assembly in India

Ramgarh
- Constituency No. 69 for the Jammu and Kashmir Legislative Assembly

Constituency details
- Country: India
- State: Jammu and Kashmir
- District: Samba
- Lok Sabha constituency: Jammu
- Established: 2022
- Reservation: SC

Member of Legislative Assembly
- Incumbent Devinder Kumar Manyal
- Party: BJP
- Alliance: NDA
- Elected year: 2024

Ramgarh Assembly constituency is an assembly constituency in the Jammu and Kashmir Legislative Assembly.

== Members of Legislative Assembly ==
Year	Member	Party
2024	Devinder Kumar Manyal	Bharatiya Janata Party

== Election results ==
=== 2024 ===
Jammu and Kashmir Legislative Assembly election, 2024: Ramgarh
Party	Candidate	Votes	%	±%
BJP	Devinder Kumar Manyal	35,672	51.53	
INC	Yash Paul Kundal	21,470	31.02	
JKAP	Sahil Bharti	10,426	15.06	
BSP	Parshotam Singh	457	0.66	
Independent	Manoj Kumar	208	0.30	
NOTA	None of the Above	283	0.41	
Majority		14,202	20.51	
Turnout		69,224		
BJP win (new seat)				
