= Chander Prakash (politician) =

Indian politician

Chander Prakash is an Indian politician from Jammu and Kashmir. He is an MLA from Vijaypur Jammu and Kashmir Assembly constituency in Samba district. He won the 2014 Jammu and Kashmir Legislative Assembly election and 2024 Jammu and Kashmir Legislative Assembly election representing Bharatiya Janata Party.

== Career ==
He was a former State Minister of Industries of Jammu & Kashmir.
