= Mushtaq Guroo =

Indian politician and business tycoon

Member of Jammu and Kashmir Legislative Assembly
- Incumbent
- Assumed office 8 October 2024
- Constituency: Chanapora

Personal details
- Political party: Jammu & Kashmir National Conference
- Spouse: Mehar Guroo (Lawyer)
- Children: Yahya Guroo (Managing Partner Shuhul Group)
- Profession: Politician, Businessman

Mushtaq Guroo is an Indian politician and business tycoon serving as the member of the Jammu and Kashmir Legislative Assembly from 2024, representing Chanapora constituency through Jammu & Kashmir National Conference. He won this seat by defeating Jammu & Kashmir Apni Party Supremo Altaf Bukhari with a margin of 6000 votes. In addition to his legislative role, he serves as the Political Advisor to the Jammu & Kashmir National Conference President Dr Farooq Abdullah since 2018. He is associated with JKNC Party Leadership and is Omar’s confidant. He is the owner of Shuhul Group of Companies.
