= Devinder Kumar Manyal =

Jammu and Kashmiri Politician

Dr Devinder Kumar Manyal
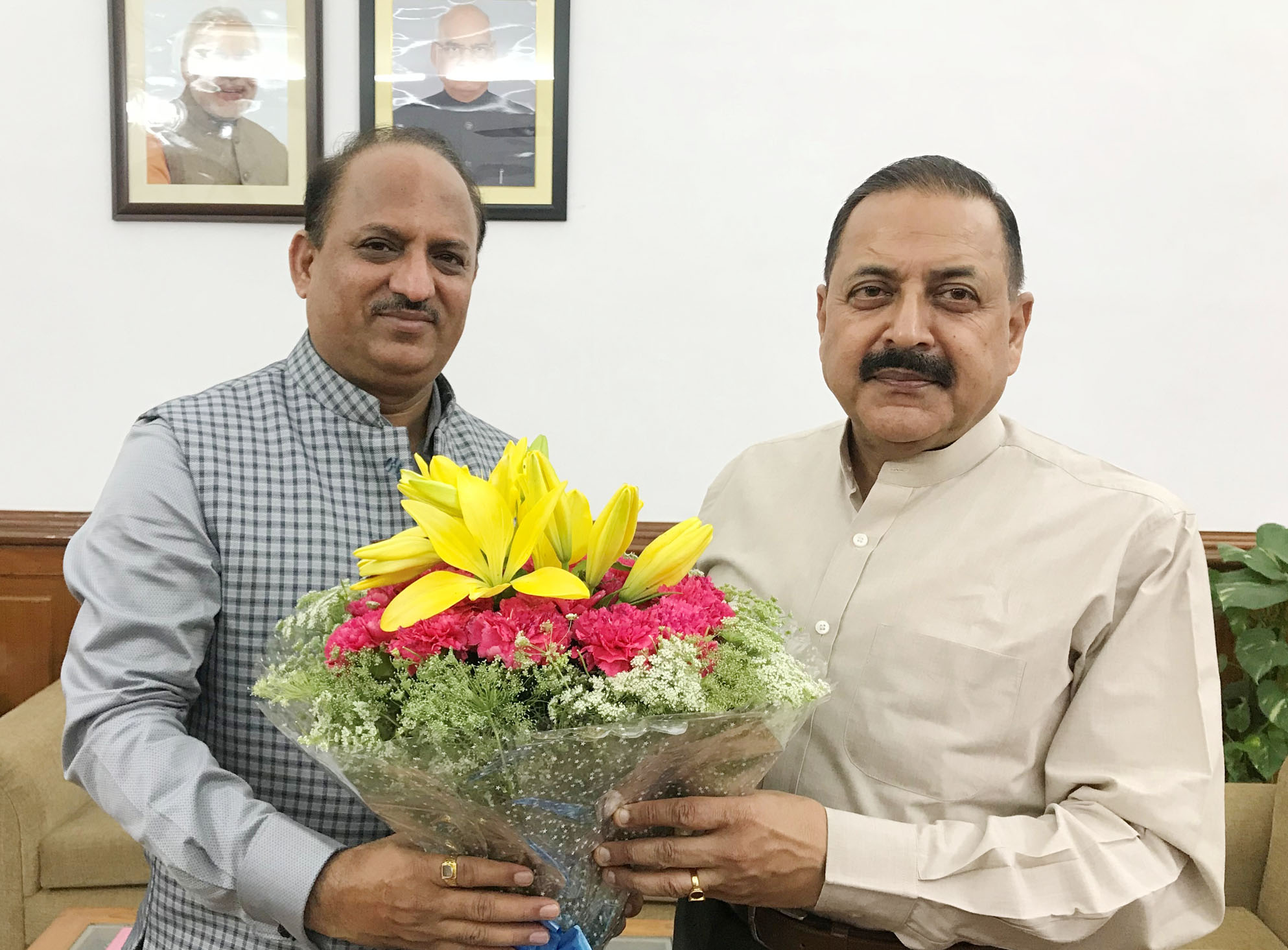

MLA Ramgarh
- Constituency: Ramgarh

Member of Legislative Assembly of Jammu & Kashmir from Ramgrah
- Incumbent
- Assumed office 2024

Former Health Minister of Jammu and Kashmir, He is an MLA from Samba Assembly constituency

Personal details
- Party: Bharatiya Janata Party
- Spouse: Poonam Manyal
- Children: 2
- Education: MBBS
- Occupation: Politician

Dr Devinder Kumar Manyal (born 21 April 1969) is an Indian politician from Jammu and Kashmir. The current MLA of Ramgarh and former health minister of Jammu and Kashmir. He was an MLA from Samba Assembly constituency which is reserved for Scheduled Caste community in Samba district. He won the 2024 Jammu and Kashmir Legislative Assembly election representing the Bharatiya Janata Party.

== Early life and education ==
Dr Devinder Kumar Manyal is from Diani Village, Samba Tehsil and District, Jammu and Kashmir. He is the son of Late Som Nath Manyal, a retired politician. He is a doctor by profession and a retired government employee and his wife is a doctor in government service. He completed his MBBS at B.L.D.E. Medical College, Bijapur. Later, he did a Diploma in Orthopaedics at Wardha Jawahar Lal Nehru Medical College, Maharashtra.

== Career ==
Dr Devinder Kumar Manyal won the Samba Assembly constituency representing the Bharatiya Janata Party in the 2014 Jammu and Kashmir Legislative Assembly election. He polled 34,075 votes and defeated his nearest rival, Yash Paul Kundal of Jammu and Kashmir National Panthers Party, by a margin of 22,118 votes. Later, he won on a Bharatiya Janata Party ticket, the Ramgarh Assembly constituency in the 2024 Jammu and Kashmir Legislative Assembly election. He polled 35,672 votes and defeated his nearest rival, Yash Paul Kundal of Indian National Congress, by a margin of 14,202 votes.

== Electoral performance ==
Election	Constituency	Party	Result	Votes %	Opposition Candidate	Opposition Party	Opposition vote %	Ref
2024	Ramgarh, Jammu and Kashmir	BJP	Won	51.53%	Yash Paul Kundal	INC	31.02%	
2014	Samba	BJP	Won	53.08%	Yash Paul Kundal	JKNPP	18.63%	
