= Jammu and Kashmir People's Democratic Party =

Political party in Jammu and Kashmir, India

- Abbreviation: JKPDP
- President: Mehbooba Mufti
- Chairperson: Waheed Para
- General Secretary: Abdul Haq Khan, Mohd Khurshid Alam
- Founder: Mufti Mohammed Sayeed
- Founded: 1999
- Headquarters: 2, Circuit House, Emporium Lane, Residency Road, Srinagar, Jammu and Kashmir, India
- Student wing: Peoples Democratic Student Union
- Youth wing: PDP Youth Wing
- Ideology: Kashmiriyat; Jammu and Kashmir statehood Regionalism; Islamic democracy
- Political position: Centre-right
- ECI status: State Party
- Alliance: INDIA (2023–present); Former Alliances: UPA (2004–2008); People's Alliance for Gupkar Declaration (2019–2024) (State Level); NDA (2014–2018) (India)
- Seats in Rajya Sabha: 0 / 245
- Seats in Lok Sabha: 0 / 543
- Seats in Jammu and Kashmir Legislative Assembly: 4 / 90
- Seats in District Development Council: 27 / 280

Election symbol
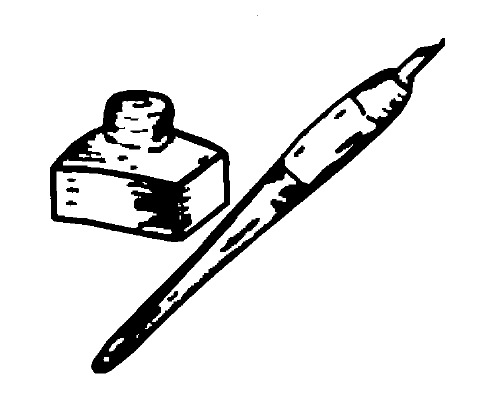

Website
- jkpdp.in

The Jammu and Kashmir Peoples Democratic Party (JKPDP) is a state political party in Jammu and Kashmir, India. The PDP was headed and founded by Mufti Mohammed Sayeed. His daughter, Mehbooba Mufti, succeeded him as party leader and as chief minister of Jammu and Kashmir following his death in January 2016. The party was a member of the People's Alliance for Gupkar Declaration electoral alliance.

Currently Mehbooba Mufti remains as the president of the party, with Waheed Para serving as the legislative party leader in the J&K Assembly, Fayaz Ahmad Mir as whip and Mirza Mehboob Beg as the Chief Spokesperson for the party.

== History ==
The PDP was founded in 1999 by the former Union Home Minister Mufti Mohammed Sayeed. It captured power in Jammu and Kashmir in October 2002 Assembly elections. In 2004, it had one member each in the Lok Sabha and in the Rajya Sabha. It was a member of the ruling United Progressive Alliance until the 2009 general election.

Sayeed headed the PDP-Indian National Congress coalition government between October 2002 and November 2005, and the PDP- BJP government between March 2015 and January 2016 and he was the party's patron until his death on 7 January 2016. The PDP is now headed by Mehbooba Mufti, Sayeed's daughter.

The PDP operates on the ideology of self-rule, as distinctly different from the issues of autonomy. It believes that self-rule as a political philosophy, as opposed to autonomy, ensures the empowerment of the people of Jammu and Kashmir, while further engaging in debates over new political territoriality of the Jammu and Kashmir.

In the 2019 and 2024 Indian general election, it failed to win any Lok Sabha seat.

In the 2014 general election, three of its members were elected to the Lok Sabha, and its strength in the Legislative Assembly was 28. The party ran a coalition government in Jammu and Kashmir with the Bharatiya Janata Party until the BJP abandoned the coalition on 19 June 2018, due to concerns about terrorism and radicalization in Kashmir.

The party won just 3 seats in the 2024 Jammu and Kashmir Legislative Assembly election. It was also its worst election performance in Jammu and Kashmir since its formation.

== Election results ==
=== Lok Sabha ===
Election Year	Lok Sabha	Seats contested	Seats won	Overall votes	(%) of votes	(±) in seats	Vote swing
Lok Sabha
2004	14th	3	1 / 6	2,67,457	11.94%	▲1	new
2009	15th	6	0 / 6	5,22,760	20.06%	▼1	▲8.12
2014	16th	5	3 / 6	7,32,644	20.54%	▲3	▲0.48
2019	17th	3	0 / 6	1,20,754	3.38%	▼3	▼17.16
2024	18th	3	0 / 5	4,33,049	8.48%	Steady	▲5.10

=== Jammu and Kashmir Legislative Assembly ===
Election Year	Assembly	Seats contested	Seats won	Overall votes	(%) of votes	(±) in seats	Vote swing	Outcome
Jammu and Kashmir Legislative Assembly
2002	10th	59	16 / 87	2,46,480	9.28%	▲16	new	Government
2008	11th	78	21 / 87	6,10,502	15.39%	▲5	▲6.11	Opposition
2014	12th	84	28 / 87	10,92,203	22.67%	▲7	▲7.28	Government
2024	1st (UT)	81	3 / 90	5,11,434	8.97%	▼25	▼13.70	Opposition

== List of Chief Ministers ==
=== Chief Ministers ===
No	Name	Image	Constituency	Term of office		Tenure length	Party	Governor
1	Mufti Mohammad Sayeed		Pahalgam	2 November 2002	2 November 2005	3 years, 0 days	People's Democratic Party	Girish Chandra Saxena
2	Mufti Mohammad Sayeed		Anantnag	1 March 2015	7 January 2016	312 days	People's Democratic Party	N. N. Vohra
3	Mehbooba Mufti		Anantnag	4 April 2016	20 June 2018	2 years, 77 days	People's Democratic Party	N. N. Vohra

=== Deputy chief ===
No	Name	Constituency	Term of office		Tenure length	5,years
1	Muzaffar Hussain Baig	Pahalgam	2 November 2006	11 July 2008	1 year, 252 days	10th

== See also ==
- Jammu and Kashmir National Conference
- Jammu and Kashmir Apni Party
- Jammu and Kashmir Workers Party
- Ikkjutt Jammu
- Politics of Jammu and Kashmir
- Bharatiya Janata Party
- Indian National Congress
- Jammu and Kashmir People's Conference
