= Chowdry Mohammad Ramzan =

Indian politician

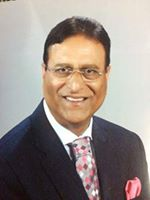
- Ramzan in 2014

Member of Parliament, Rajya Sabha
- Incumbent
- Assumed office 25 October 2025
- Preceded by: Nazir Ahmad Laway
- Constituency: Jammu and Kashmir

Member of Jammu and Kashmir Legislative Assembly
- In office 1983–2002
- Preceded by: Abdul Ghani Lone
- Succeeded by: Ghulam Mohi-Ud-Din Sofi
- Constituency: Handwara
- In office 2008–2014
- Preceded by: Ghulam Mohi-Ud-Din Sofi
- Succeeded by: Sajjad Gani Lone
- Constituency: Handwara

Personal details
- Born: 27 July 1948 (age 78) India
- Party: Jammu and Kashmir National Conference
- Spouse: Fatima Begum
- Occupation: Politician

Chowdry Mohammad Ramzan (born 27 July 1949) is an Indian politician and member of Rajya Sabha. He is affiliated with Jammu & Kashmir National Conference party. Ramzan has served 4 terms as the member of Legislative assembly from Handware constituency.

== Personal life ==
Ramzan was born on 27 July 1948 in Handwara, Kupwara, Indian-administrative Kashmir, to Gulam Ahmad Chowdry and Mehtaba Begum. He earned his Bachelor of Science from Degree College, Baramulla. In 1973, he obtained Bachelor of Laws form ILS Law College. Ramzan is married to Fatima Begum. They have one son and two daughters.

== Political Career ==
Ramzan contested his first election in 1983 and won with a margin of 10 votes. Subsequently, he won consecutively in 1987 and 1996. In 2025, Ramzan won the Rajya Sabha Seat and is now serving as a member of the upper house of Indian Parliament.

Elections results of 1983, 1987, 1996, 2008
Constituency	Year of Election	Name of Winner	Party	Votes Polled (%)	Runner up	Party	Votes Polled (%)
Handwara	1983	Chowdry Mohammad Ramzan	JKNC	45.48%	Abdul Ghani Lone	JKPC	45.46%
Handwara	1987	Chowdry Mohammad Ramzan	JKNC	46.93%	Abdul Ghani Lone	JKPC	43.88%
Handwara	1996	Chowdry Mohammad Ramzan	JKNC	66.71%	Ali Mohammed Dar	INC	18.40%
Handwara	2008	Chowdry Mohammad Ramzan	JKNC	48.38%	Ghulam Mohi-Ud-Din Sofi	Independent	28.29%
