= Mohamad Yousuf Tarigami =

Indian politician

Mohammed Yousuf Tarigami
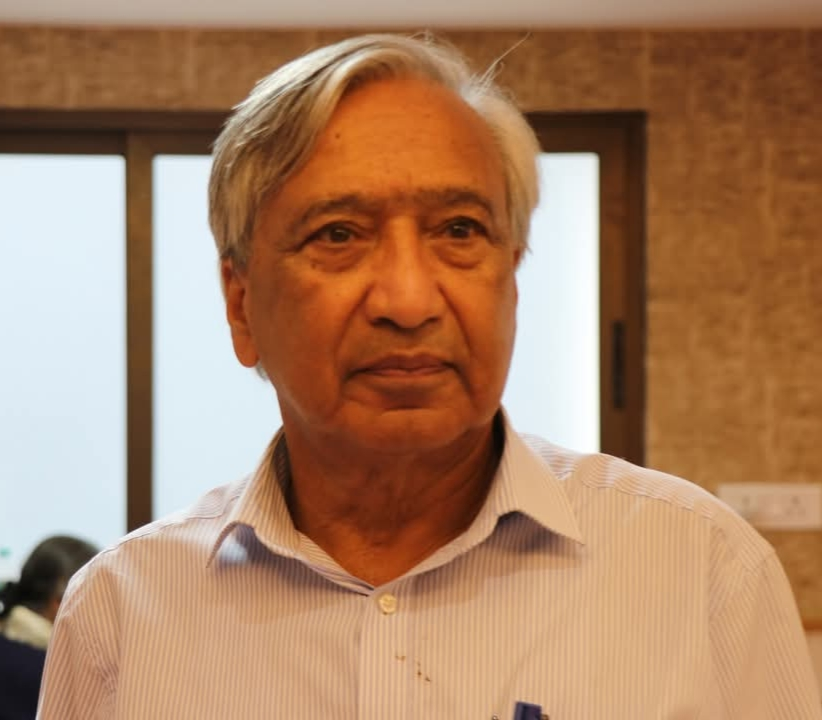
- MY Tarigami

Member of Jammu and Kashmir Legislative Assembly
- Incumbent
- Assumed office 8 October 2024
- Preceded by: Himself
- Constituency: Kulgam
- In office 1996–2018
- Preceded by: Abdul Razak Mir
- Succeeded by: Himself
- Constituency: Kulgam

Personal details
- Born: 17 July 1949 (age 77) Tarigam village, Kulgam district, Princely State of Jammu and Kashmir, Dominion of India (now in Union Territory of Jammu and Kashmir, India)
- Party: Communist Party of India (Marxist)

Mohammed Yousuf Tarigami (born 17 July 1949) is an Indian politician from Jammu and Kashmir. He belongs to the Communist Party of India (Marxist) (CPI(M)) and is a member of the Jammu and Kashmir Legislative Assembly, to which he has been elected five times consecutively since 1996, representing the Kulgam Assembly Constituency.

He is the Central Committee member of CPI(M) and the former state secretary of the party in Jammu and Kashmir. He was the convenor and spokesperson of the People’s Alliance for Gupkar Declaration.

== Early life ==
Tarigami was born into a farmer family in Tarigam village of Kulgam. Named Mohammed Yousuf Rather, he took on the last name 'Tarigami' later in life. His late father was Gulam Rasool Rather. He could not appear for the B.A. final year examination due to the political turbulence in Kashmir. He lost his wife during childbirth in 1975, during which he was a political prisoner.

He came to be known as Tarigami after Press Trust of India journalist P.N. Jalali asked Sheikh Abdullah, the then Chief Minister of Jammu and Kashmir about his arrest during a press briefing. Abdullah responded, 'Woh Jo Tarigam Wala', referring to his village. From then on, the media, especially newspapers, wrote his name as Mohammed Yousuf Tarigami.

== Political life ==
Yousuf Tarigami was shaped as a communist under the influence of Abdul Kabir Wani of Chawalgam. In 1967, when he was 18, Tarigami and his friend Ghulam Nabi Malik, now the J&K secretary of the CPI(M), organised a protest to demand an increase in intake capacity at Anantnag Degree College. The two were then part of a local communist group called the Revolutionary Students and Youth Federation. They did a hunger strike for 36 hours at the deputy commissioner’s office and the authorities were forced to raise the total intake of the college. After the successful campaign, Tarigami took part in various farmer movements in J&K under farmer leader Abdul Qadir, but their political activism took a more solid shape when they joined the Democratic Conference, which was part of the CPI(M), in 1967. Tarigami grew close to communist leader Ram Pyaare Saraf and served as his understudy. When Saraf split from the CPI(M) to lend support to the Naxalite movement and joined the CPI (Marxist-Leninist), so did Tarigami.

In 1967, he was imprisoned for taking up the cause of farmers against the forcible procurement of rice. After the 1975 Indira-Sheikh Accord, under which Jammu and Kashmir was made a constituent unit of the Union of India, Tarigami demanded the right to self-determination, and his activism landed him in jail. While he was in prison, his wife died. The government released him on parole for a month but rearrested him after three days.

In 1979, when the execution of former Pakistan PM Zulfikar Ali Bhutto led to riots in Kashmir, Sheikh Abdullah, confronted Marxists and Tarigami became among the first people to be booked under the controversial Public Safety Act (PSA). In the aftermath of the Bhutto episode, both Malik and Tarigami rejoined the CPI(M) and restarted their journey in Kulgam as mainstream politicians. In his political journey, he has been imprisoned in various jails like the Sub-Jail Reasi, the very dangerous torture centres of Red-16 and Papa II.

In 2005, militants entered the heavily guarded Tulsibagh colony in Srinagar and attacked the homes of Tarigami and the Minister for Education Ghulam Nabi Lone. Lone was killed. (In 2015, ten years after Ghulam Nabi Lone's death, there was another minister in Kashmir with the same name belonging to People's Democratic Party PDP) In the attack in 2005, Tarigami's guards fought off the attackers, although one of his guards was killed. He is a Z category protectee by Government of India.

In 2016, he slammed the former MP Tariq Hameed Karra for resigning from Lok Sabha membership and said he should have raised the Kashmir issue in Indian Parliament. He added that the dialogue with Kashmir should not be through interlocutors but with the involvement of the Parliament by constituting a committee of senior Parliamentarians. He views the tradition of Kashmir as built on the sacrifices of the working class. He said that the Zaldagar martyrs of 1865 laid the foundation of a struggle against the exploitation and atrocities on the artisans and the Shawlbaff protest launched at Zaldagar against the ruling class has given vent to numerous movements of the working class which are awaiting successful culmination.

He saw the BJP’s policy vis-a-vis Kashmir as successful in distracting people from pressing issues such as unemployment and economic stagnation by centring its campaign around Kashmir as a vehicle to further its bellicose nationalism. He views BJP's approach on Articles 370 and 35A as a great disservice to the nation’s unity as it will lead to disintegration of the State of J&K from India, also by eroding the Kashmiris’ sense of unity with the nation.

=== After abrogation of Article 370 ===
Immediately after the abrogation of Article 370, Tarigami was placed in house arrest at Srinagar for 35 days. In August 2019, CPI(M) General Secretary Sitaram Yechury filed a Habeas corpus petition in Supreme Court to find Mohammed Yusuf Tarigami, who was targeted by Jammu & Kashmir authority. Sitaram Yechury was allowed by the court to visit Jammu and Kashmir only to meet his party colleague. Yousuf Tarigami, was kept under detention in Srinagar since Jammu and Kashmir lost its special status, and he was shifted to All India Institute of Medical Sciences in New Delhi for medical care, following a Supreme Court order on 5 September 2019. Supreme Court later allowed him to return freely to Kashmir.

Tarigami was the first political leader from the state to address a press conference after the abrogation of Article 370. He slammed the modi Government for detaining former Jammu and Kashmir Chief Minister Farooq Abdullah under the Public Safety Act. He said, "We, Abdullah and others are not terrorists,... We also want to live, a Kashmiri, is saying this,"..This is my appeal, please listen to us too. The average Kashmiri doesn’t ask for heavens, we just ask for a chance to march with you."

Tarigami approached the Supreme Court challenging the order of the Union Ministry of Home Affairs that allowed people from across the country to buy land in the territory of Jammu and Kashmir, including agricultural land. In the aftermath of repealing Article 370, he said, "Kashmiris have been humiliated, feel betrayed." He refuted the government claim that there is normalcy in Kashmir, and pointed out that Modi Government made Kashmir into graveyards.

On 24 October 2020 he was elected as the convenor of the People's Alliance for Gupkar Declaration (PAGD). The seven-party PAGD swept the maiden District Development Council (DDC) polls by winning 110 seats out of 276 seats, and Tarigami said that the results was a clear indication that the people of Jammu and Kashmir want "restoration of their rights". He said that, for the PAGD, the dignity of the people of J&K matters the most.

He called on Jammu and Kashmir Lieutenant Governor Manoj Sinha and raised the issue of the encounter in Srinagar’s Hokersar-Lawaypora. He demanded an impartial and time-bound probe into the incident in which three youths including a 17-year-old from South Kashmir’s Pulwama and Shopian districts were killed on 30 December inside a house in Hokersar on the outskirts of Srinagar by the security forces in an encounter. He slammed New Delhi and the UT administration for utilising the pandemic and security induced lockdown to pass contentious laws without consultation, confident that there would be no resistance.

Tarigami argued that there was no need for the J&K administration to constitute a special task force (STF) to deal with government employees allegedly involved in "anti-national activities" as there were already enough provisions in the law to act against such people. He also demanded the release of Kashmiri "political detainees" lodged in various jails within the Valley in view of the surge in Covid-19 cases. Further, he urged the government to provide adequate incentives and wages to ASHA workers on the pattern of COVID-19 warriors of the Health and Medical Education Department.

==== People’s Alliance for Gupkar Declaration ====
Tarigami was the Convenor and Spokesperson of People’s Alliance for Gupkar Declaration, an alliance of regional parties in Jammu and Kashmir committed for the restoration of Article 370.

The alliance was headed by headed by National Conference chief Dr Farooq Abdullah and it includes Jammu & Kashmir National Conference, Jammu and Kashmir People's Democratic Party, Communist Party of India (Marxist), Jammu and Kashmir Awami National Conference and Jammu & Kashmir People's Movement.

=== Electoral Politics ===
Tarigami was repeatedly successful in electoral polls from the Kulgam constituency. He became the Member of Legislative Assembly from Kulgam (Vidhan Sabha constituency) in 1996, 2002, 2008 ,2014 and 2024 assembly polls. In 1996 assembly polls, his winning margin was 51.56 percentage. He sustained the constituency in 2002, 2008, 2014 and 2024 by a winning margin of 30.27, 0.47, 0.63 and 10.46 percentage respectively. He was also the only elected communist politician in Jammu and Kashmir Legislative assembly during these times.

1996, 2002, 2008, 2014 & 2024 Jammu & Kashmir Assembly Election
Constituency	Year of Election	Name of Winner	Party	Votes Polled (%)	Runner up	Party	Votes Polled (%)
Kulgam	1996	Mohammed Yousuf Tarigami	Communist Party of India (Marxist)	69.65	Habibullah Laway	Janata Dal	18.09
Kulgam	2002	Mohammed Yousuf Tarigami	Communist Party of India (Marxist)	51.72	Gh.Nabi Dar	Jammu & Kashmir National Conference	21.45
Kulgam	2008	Mohammed Yousuf Tarigami	Communist Party of India (Marxist)	34.24	Nazir Ahmad Laway	Jammu and Kashmir Peoples Democratic Party	33.77
Kulgam	2014	Mohammed Yousuf Tarigami	Communist Party of India (Marxist)	38.69	Nazir Ahmad Laway	Jammu and Kashmir Peoples Democratic Party	38.06
Kulgam	2024	Mohammed Yousuf Tarigami	Communist Party of India (Marxist)	44.86	Sayar Ahmed Reshi	Independent	34.40
