= Handwara Assembly constituency =

Constituency of the Jammu and Kashmir legislative assembly in India

Coordinates: 34.402°N 74.281°E

Handwara
- Constituency No. 5 for the Jammu and Kashmir Legislative Assembly

Constituency details
- Country: India
- State: Jammu and Kashmir
- District: Kupwara
- Lok Sabha constituency: Baramulla
- Established: 1962
- Total electors: number of electors at last election. Add a ref

Member of Legislative Assembly
- Incumbent Sajad Gani Lone
- Party: Jammu and Kashmir People's Conference
- Elected year: 2024

Handwara Assembly constituency is one of the 90 constituencies in the Jammu and Kashmir Legislative Assembly of Jammu and Kashmir a north state of India. Handwara is also part of Baramulla Lok Sabha constituency.

== Member of Legislative Assembly ==
Year	Member	Party
1962	Abdul Gani Mir	Independent politician
1967	Abdul Gani Lone	Indian National Congress
1972	Abdul Gani Lone	Indian National Congress
1977	Abdul Gani Lone	Janata Party
1983	Chowdry Mohammad Ramzan	Jammu & Kashmir National Conference
1987	Chowdry Mohammad Ramzan	Jammu & Kashmir National Conference
1996	Chowdry Mohammad Ramzan	Jammu & Kashmir National Conference
2002	Ghulam Mohi-Ud-Din Sofi	Independent politician
2008	Chowdary Mohmad Ramzan	Jammu & Kashmir National Conference
2014	Sajad Gani Lone	Jammu and Kashmir People's Conference
2024	Sajad Gani Lone	Jammu and Kashmir People's Conference

== Election results ==
=== Assembly Election 2024 ===
2024 Jammu and Kashmir Legislative Assembly election : Handwara
Party	Candidate	Votes	%	±%
JKPC	Sajjad Gani Lone	29,812	40.78%	▼2.40
JKNC	Chowdary Mohammed Ramzan	29,150	39.88%	New
Independent	Abdul Majid Banday	7,639	10.45%	New
JKPDP	Gauhar Azad Mir	2,010	2.75%	▼11.74
BJP	Ghulam Mohammad Mir	1,750	2.39%	New
Independent	Zahid Mushtaq Sheikh	1,218	1.67%	New
NOTA	None of the Above	1,253	1.71%	▲0.57
Margin of victory		662	0.91%	▼7.07
Turnout		73,100	74.29%	▼1.26
Registered electors		98,404		▲9.36
JKPC hold		Swing	▼2.40	

=== Assembly Election 2014 ===
2014 Jammu and Kashmir Legislative Assembly election : Handwara
Party	Candidate	Votes	%	±%
JKPC	Sajjad Gani Lone	29,355	43.19%	New
JKNC	Chowdary Mohammed Ramzan	23,932	35.21%	▼13.18
JKPDP	Ghulam Mohi-Ud-Din Sofi	9,849	14.49%	▲8.47
INC	Mohammed Yaseen Bhat	1,119	1.65%	New
Independent	Abdul Rahman Tantry	747	1.10%	New
BSP	Sajjad Ahmad Pir	492	0.72%	New
NOTA	None of the Above	776	1.14%	New
Margin of victory		5,423	7.98%	▼12.12
Turnout		67,974	75.54%	▼0.04
Registered electors		89,983		▲17.91
JKPC gain from JKNC		Swing	▼5.20	

=== Assembly Election 2008 ===
2008 Jammu and Kashmir Legislative Assembly election : Handwara
Party	Candidate	Votes	%	±%
JKNC	Chowdary Mohammed Ramzan	27,907	48.38%	▲10.81
Independent	Ghulam Mohi-Ud-Din Sofi	16,317	28.29%	New
Independent	Mohammed Yaseen Bhat	4,825	8.37%	New
JKPDP	Ghulam Mohammed Mir	3,471	6.02%	New
JKANC	Mohammed Shafi Dar	1,562	2.71%	New
Jammu & Kashmir National United Front	Pawan Kumar	883	1.53%	New
Independent	Ghulam Nabi Shah	731	1.27%	New
Margin of victory		11,590	20.09%	▲11.01
Turnout		57,678	75.58%	▲24.10
Registered electors		76,316		▲19.14
JKNC gain from Independent		Swing	▲1.72	

=== Assembly Election 2002 ===
2002 Jammu and Kashmir Legislative Assembly election : Handwara
Party	Candidate	Votes	%	±%
Independent	Ghulam Mohi-Ud-Din Sofi	15,389	46.67%	New
JKNC	Chowdary Mohammed Ramzan	12,392	37.58%	▼29.13
JD(U)	Bashir Ahmad Bara	1,463	4.44%	New
Independent	Ghulam Mohi-Ud-Din Wani	1,092	3.31%	New
Independent	Aman - Ullah Khan	849	2.57%	New
INC	Ali Mohammed Dar	619	1.88%	▼16.53
Independent	Abdul Rashid Khan	414	1.26%	New
Margin of victory		2,997	9.09%	▼39.22
Turnout		32,976	51.48%	▲20.51
Registered electors		64,056		▲20.99
Independent gain from JKNC		Swing	▼20.05	

=== Assembly Election 1996 ===
1996 Jammu and Kashmir Legislative Assembly election : Handwara
Party	Candidate	Votes	%	±%
JKNC	Mohammed Ramzan Chowdry	10,937	66.71%	▲19.78
INC	Ali Mohammed Dar	3,017	18.40%	New
JD	Ghulam Nabi Peer	1,467	8.95%	New
JKNPP	Taja Begum	973	5.94%	New
Margin of victory		7,920	48.31%	▲45.25
Turnout		16,394	34.82%	▼47.79
Registered electors		52,943		▼4.19
JKNC hold		Swing	▲19.78	

=== Assembly Election 1987 ===
1987 Jammu and Kashmir Legislative Assembly election : Handwara
Party	Candidate	Votes	%	±%
JKNC	Chowdary Mohammed Ramzan	20,423	46.93%	▲1.45
JKPC	Abdul Ghani Lone	19,093	43.88%	▼1.61
Independent	Nazir Ahmed Bhat	2,438	5.60%	New
Independent	Mohmed-Rustum Bhat	574	1.32%	New
Independent	Ghulam Mohmad Dar	462	1.06%	New
Independent	Ghulam Mohmad Mochi	306	0.70%	New
Margin of victory		1,330	3.06%	▲3.03
Turnout		43,516	82.19%	▲4.84
Registered electors		55,258		▲5.70
JKNC hold		Swing	▲1.45	

=== Assembly Election 1983 ===
1983 Jammu and Kashmir Legislative Assembly election : Handwara
Party	Candidate	Votes	%	±%
JKNC	Chowdary Mohammed Ramzan	17,575	45.48%	▲0.75
JKPC	Abdul Ghani Lone	17,565	45.46%	▲0.73
INC	Ghulam Rasool	1,658	4.29%	▲2.55
JI	Ghulam Nabi	1,209	3.13%	New
Independent	Sheikh Abdul Rahman	481	1.24%	New
Margin of victory		10	0.03%	▼7.03
Turnout		38,641	76.85%	▼7.47
Registered electors		52,280		▲29.45
JKNC gain from JP		Swing	▼6.30	

=== Assembly Election 1977 ===
1977 Jammu and Kashmir Legislative Assembly election : Handwara
Party	Candidate	Votes	%	±%
JP	Abdul Ghani Lone	17,021	51.78%	New
JKNC	Sharif Ud Din	14,702	44.73%	New
Independent	Sheikh Abdul Rahman	575	1.75%	New
INC	Ghulam Rasool War	571	1.74%	▼86.68
Margin of victory		2,319	7.06%	▼69.77
Turnout		32,869	83.41%	▼3.51
Registered electors		40,387		▲24.80
JP gain from INC		Swing	▼36.63	

=== Assembly Election 1972 ===
1972 Jammu and Kashmir Legislative Assembly election : Handwara
Party	Candidate	Votes	%	±%
INC	Abdul Ghani Lone	24,291	88.41%	New
Independent	Sharif Ud Din	3,183	11.59%	New
Margin of victory		21,108	76.83%	
Turnout		27,474	86.10%	▲84.90
Registered electors		32,362		▲12.37
INC hold		Swing		

=== Assembly Election 1967 ===
1967 Jammu and Kashmir Legislative Assembly election : Handwara
Party	Candidate	Votes	%	±%
INC	Abdul Ghani Lone	Unopposed		
Registered electors		28,800		▲21.80
INC gain from Independent		Swing		

=== Assembly Election 1962 ===
1962 Jammu and Kashmir Legislative Assembly election : Handwara
Party	Candidate	Votes	%	±%
Independent	Abdul Gani Mir	11,429	60.63%	New
JKNC	Ghulam Qadir Massala	7,422	39.37%	New
Margin of victory		4,007	21.26%	
Turnout		18,851	79.77%	
Registered electors		23,645		
Independent win (new seat)				

== See also ==
- Handwara
- Kupwara district
- List of constituencies of Jammu and Kashmir Legislative Assembly
