= Politics of Jammu and Kashmir =

Union Territory In India

- Emblem of Jammu and Kashmir
- Polity type: Union territory of India: A federal territory with its own elected legislatures and governments; with partial statehood
- Constitution: Constitution of India

Legislative branch
- Name: Legislative Assembly
- Type: Unicameral
- Presiding officer: Abdul Rahim Rather

Executive branch
- Head of state
- Title: Lieutenant Governor
- Currently: Manoj Sinha
- Head of government
- Title: Chief Minister
- Currently: Omar Abdullah

Judicial branch
- Jammu and Kashmir High Court
- Chief judge: Ali Mohammad Magrey

Jammu and Kashmir is administered by the Republic of India within the framework of a federal parliamentary republic as a union territory, like the union territory of Puducherry, with a multi-party democratic system of governance. Until 2019, it was governed as a state administered by India. Politics in the region reflects the historical tension and dispute that the state has been a part of in the form of the Kashmir conflict. The head of state is the Lieutenant Governor of Jammu and Kashmir, currently Manoj Sinha, while the head of government is the Chief Minister of Jammu and Kashmir, currently Omar Abdullah. Legislative power is vested in the Legislative Assembly of Jammu and Kashmir. The judiciary is independent of the executive and the legislature.

== History ==
Gulab Singh has been called as the founder of the polity of Jammu and Kashmir. Following the 1860s, interaction with British India resulted in the region becoming a part of the geopolitical game between Russia and Britain. During the period of India's independence, the partition, up till and after India becoming a Republic, the question of Kashmir's future marked political decisions. The introduction of Pakistan into the internal political situation at this stage created complexities.

Some observers point out that the Kashmir conflict is a political issue. Amidst the political instability that the conflict has brought to the region, all the governments of Jammu and Kashmir have been engaged in attaining normalcy. The state has seen a "parallel existence of the democratic and separatist sphere of politics" and a shift from political hegemony till as late as 2002 to a multi-party system.

Historically Kashmiri Muslims preferred greater autonomy and sovereignty for the region or an independent Kashmir. However a minority of the non-Muslims who live in the region prefer the state to be fully integrated into India. Some Kashmiri Muslims also prefer to be part of Pakistan and a small part of Kashmir is under Pakistan control. There have also been a number of separatist movements, both political and militant, mostly led by Muslim leaders. However, in recent years there have been claims that a growing number of Kashmiri Muslims have been leaning towards remaining in India for economic and cultural reasons. A 2008 report by United Nations High Commissioner for Refugees determined that the State of Jammu and Kashmir was the only 'Partly free' state in India but it is now a Union Territory rather than a State. Human rights abuses in the Indian state of Jammu and Kashmir and a strong Indian army presence have also been an issue and affect the politics of the region.

In August 2019, the Government of India introduced the Jammu and Kashmir Reorganisation Bill, 2019 in the Rajya Sabha and moved resolution to scrap the Article 370 from the Constitution of India and bifurcate the state of Jammu and Kashmir into two Union Territories – Jammu & Kashmir with a legislation like Delhi, and Ladakh with a legislation like Chandigarh. Jammu and Kashmir was the only Indian state that had its own flag. However, as Article 370 of the Indian constitution, which granted Jammu and Kashmir autonomy, was abrogated in August 2019, the flag has lost its official status.

== Political parties of Jammu & Kashmir ==
List of political parties:

- Jammu & Kashmir National Conference (JKNC)
- Bharatiya Janata Party (BJP)
- Indian National Congress (INC)
- Communist Party of India (CPI)
- Communist Party of India (Marxist) (CPIM)
- Jammu and Kashmir Peoples Democratic Party (JKPDP)
- Jammu and Kashmir Apni Party (JKAP)
- Jammu and Kashmir Awami Ittehad Party (AIP)
- Bahujan Samaj Party (BSP)
- Aam Aadmi Party (AAP)
- Jammu and Kashmir National Panthers Party (JKNPP)
- Jammu and Kashmir Workers Party (JKWP)
- Jammu and Kashmir People's Conference (JKPC)
- Jammu & Kashmir People's Movement (JKPM)
- Jammu and Kashmir Awami National Conference (JKANC)
- Democratic Progressive Azad Party (DPAP)
- All Jammu & Kashmir Patriotic Peoples Front
- Democratic Janata Dal (Jammu and Kashmir)
- Jammu and Kashmir Democratic Freedom Party
- Mallah Insaf Party
- Dogra Swabhiman Sangathan
- National Democratic Party (Indian) [NDPI]
- Jammu Republic Party (JRP)

== See also ==
- Politics of Ladakh
- 2024 Jammu and Kashmir Legislative Assembly election
- Government of Jammu and Kashmir

== Bibliography ==
- Tajuddin, Muhammad (2019). "10— Religion-polity interface in Jammu and Kashmir: An analysis". In Kumar, Narender (ed.). Politics and Religion in India. Taylor & Francis. ISBN 9781000691474.
- Kaur, Ravinderjit (1996). Political Awakening in Kashmir. New Delhi: APH Publishing. ISBN 9788170247098.
- Wani, Aijaz Ashraf (2018). What Happened to Governance in Kashmir?. New Delhi: Oxford University Press. ISBN 9780199097159.
- Chowdhary, Rekha (2019). Jammu and Kashmir: 1990 and Beyond: Competitive Politics in the Shadow of Separatism. Tamil Nadu: SAGE Publishing India. ISBN 9789353282325.
- Puri, Balraj (2015). "V: Jammu and Kashmir". In Wiener, Myron (ed.). State Politics in India. Princeton University Press. pp. 215–243. ISBN 9781400879144.
