= Ghulam Nabi Gowhar =

Indian Kashmiri author, novelist, and poet (1934–2018)

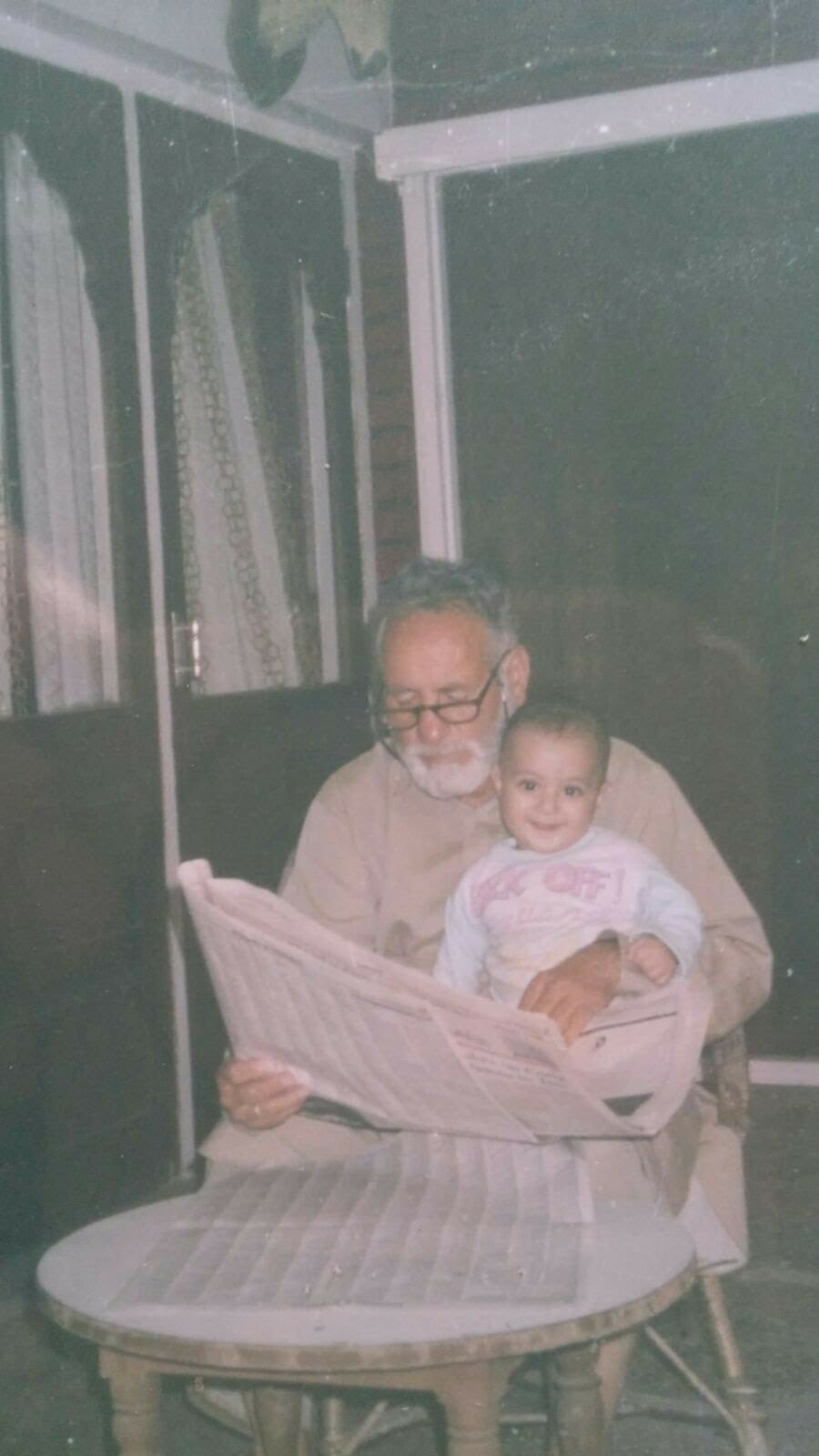
- G.N. Gowhar with his grandson
- Born: Ghulam Nabi Muqeem; June 26, 1934; Charari Sharief, Jammu and Kashmir (princely state), British India
- Died: June 19, 2018 (aged 83); Budgam, Jammu and Kashmir, India
- Resting place: Durj-e-Gowhar
- Education: Postgraduate in Persian, Gandhi Memorial College, Srinagar Bachelor of Law, Aligarh Muslim University
- Occupation: Author, Novelist, Poet, Columnist, Jurist
- Spouse: Haseena Gowhar
- Children: 4
- Writing career
- Language: Kashmiri, Urdu, English
- Years active: 1969–2018
- Subjects: Politics, Literature, History
- Notable awards: Sahitya Akademi Award

Ghulam Nabi Gowhar (born Ghulam Nabi Muqeem; 26 June 1934 – 19 June 2018) was a multilingual Kashmiri author, novelist, poet, columnist and a retired sessions jurist. He wrote about sixty books in Kashmiri, Urdu, and in English languages on various subjects such as politics, literature, history and on Sufism. In 1971, he wrote a novel titled Mujrim, leading him to become the "first novelist of Kashmiri literature". The recipient of cultural and literary awards and accordion, including Sahitya Akademi Award, he is also credited for translating the constitution of India into Kashmiri language.

He also conducted extensively research on various subjects such as history of Kashmir and Sufi saints. He is also credited for deciphering the poetry (called Shruks) of Nund Rishi. He also documented Bijbehara Massacre and Charari Sharief operation in his two historical books titled The Central Stage of Kashmir Politics and Military operation in Kashmir: insurgency at Charar-e-Sharief.

== Early life and education ==
He was born as Ghulam Nabi Muqeem to Haji Mohammed Akram Mukim in Charari Sharief town of Budgam district, Jammu and Kashmir princely state of British India. He received his initial schooling at his hometown, and graduated from Gandhi Memorial College, Srinagar. Later, he went to Uttar Pradesh and did his Bachelor of Laws from the Aligarh Muslim University (AMU). He postgraduated in Persian language from AMU.

Gowhar originally started his career in judicial. He started legal practice in Budgam, and was then appointed as a judge. Prior to his appointment, he wanted to be a politician, however before participating in elections, he qualified the judicial examination and was appointed as a judge and retired as a Sessions Judge. He, according to the Greater Kashmir wrote some judgements in the form of rhythmic poems, and sometimes used to deliver verdict on the pattern of poetry and stories.

== Literary career ==
He was also involved in writings while serving as a judge. However, he became known to literary society around 1969 when his first novel titled Mujrim (The Guilty) was published. He later wrote numerous novels until he became the "first novelist of Kashmiri literature" with a first-ever Kashmiri language novel titled Arg-e-Ashud, published in 2012 by the Adbee Markaz Kamraz (AMK), a literary organization of the union territory. In 1973, he wrote second novel titled Meoul (Union), and later Paap Ti Punye (Vice and Virtue). His third novel, which was awarded Sahitya Akademi award in 1988 was also broadcast on Radio Kashmir Jammu. He covered the history of Kashmir before partition in his another novel titled Gilnavith Kath (Torch Bearer), published by the Raider Publishing International, New York.

Besides writing novels, he conducted extensive research about Sufi saints, including Nund Rishi and wrote research books titled Kalam e Sheikhul Alam and Saheef-e-Noor on the subject. He translated poetry of Muhammad Iqbal and Bankim Chandra Chatterjee into Kashmiri language. He also edited the complete literary work of Ghulam Nabi Aariz, the 9th century's Kashmiri poet.

== Publications ==
Key
†	Remarks denote a short description of the work where available.

#	Title	Year	Type/Credited as	Remarks
1	Mujrim (The Guilty)	1969	Novel	The novel was awarded Sahitya Akademi Award
2	Meoul (Union)	1973	Novel	—N/a
3	Paap ti Punye (Vice and Virtue)	1973	Novel	The novel was awarded Sahitya Akademi Award, 1988
4	Arg-e-Ashud	2012	Novel	First-ever novel written in Kashmiri language. It covers detailed account of history of Kashmir before and after 1947
5	Taap Ti Kul (Note: also spelled Pun-Te-Pap, it was written with multiple spellings by the news media)	—N/a	Novel	—N/a
6	Gilnavith Kath (Torch Bearer)	—N/a	Novel	—N/a
7	Kalam e Sheikhul Alam	—N/a	Book	Translation of Nund Reshi's poetry
8	Saheef-e-Noor	—N/a	Book	A detailed account of Nund Reshi
9	The Central Stage of Kashmir Politics	—N/a	Book	A detailed account Bijbehara Massacre
10	Military operation in Kashmir: insurgency at Charar-e-Sharief	—N/a	Book	A detailed account of Charari Sharief operation

== Death ==
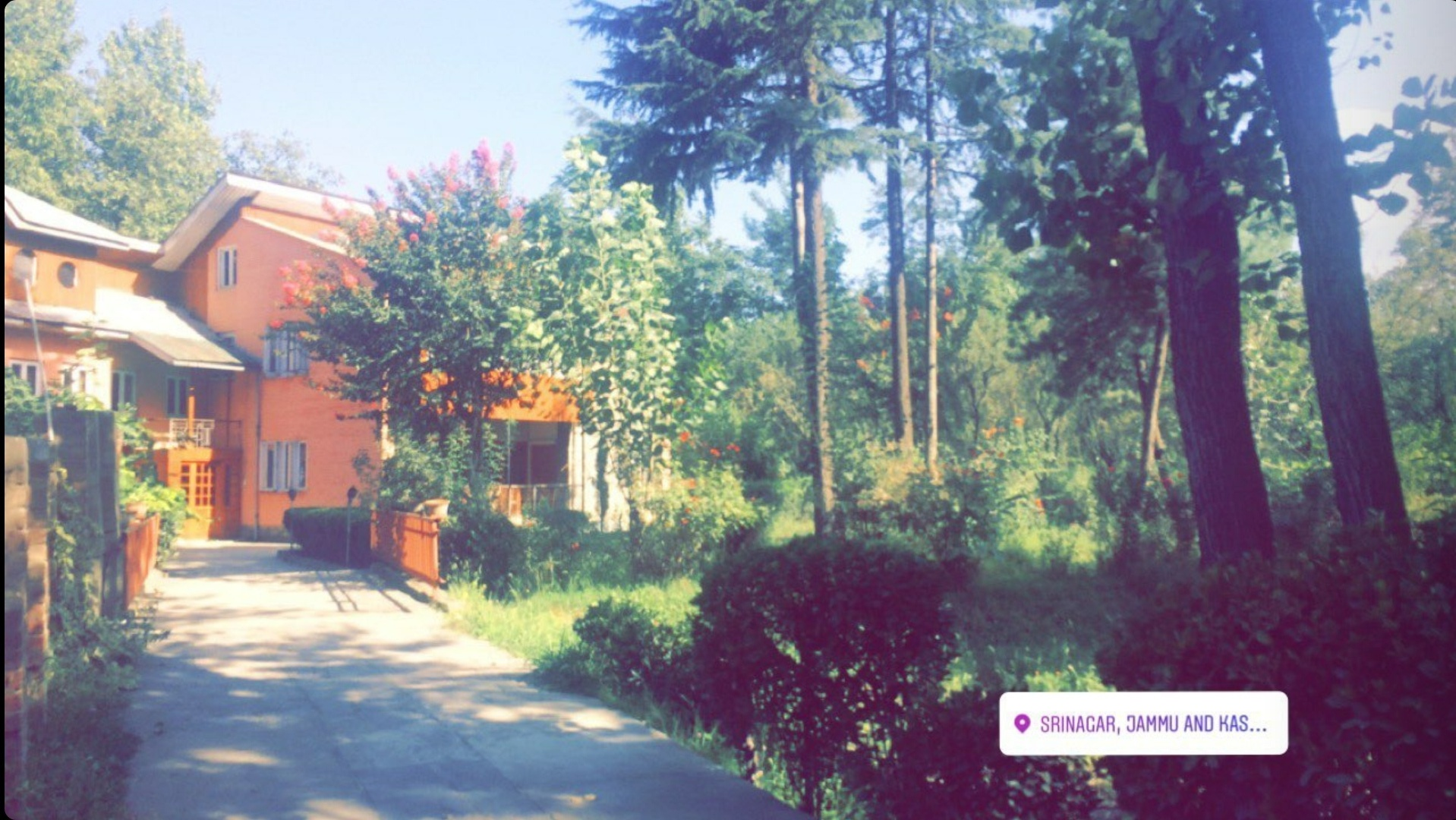
Durj-e-Gowhar - G.N. Gowhar's home and final resting place in Kralpora, Budgam, Jammu & Kashmir

Gowhar was suffering from Kidney disease and died of Kidney failure on 19 June 2018 in Kralpora of Budgam district. His death anniversary is celebrated annually by the Jammu and Kashmir Academy of Art, Culture and Languages, a state-owned literary organization dedicated to promote regional languages and art and culture in the state.
