= Abdul Gani Vakil =

Kashmiri politician

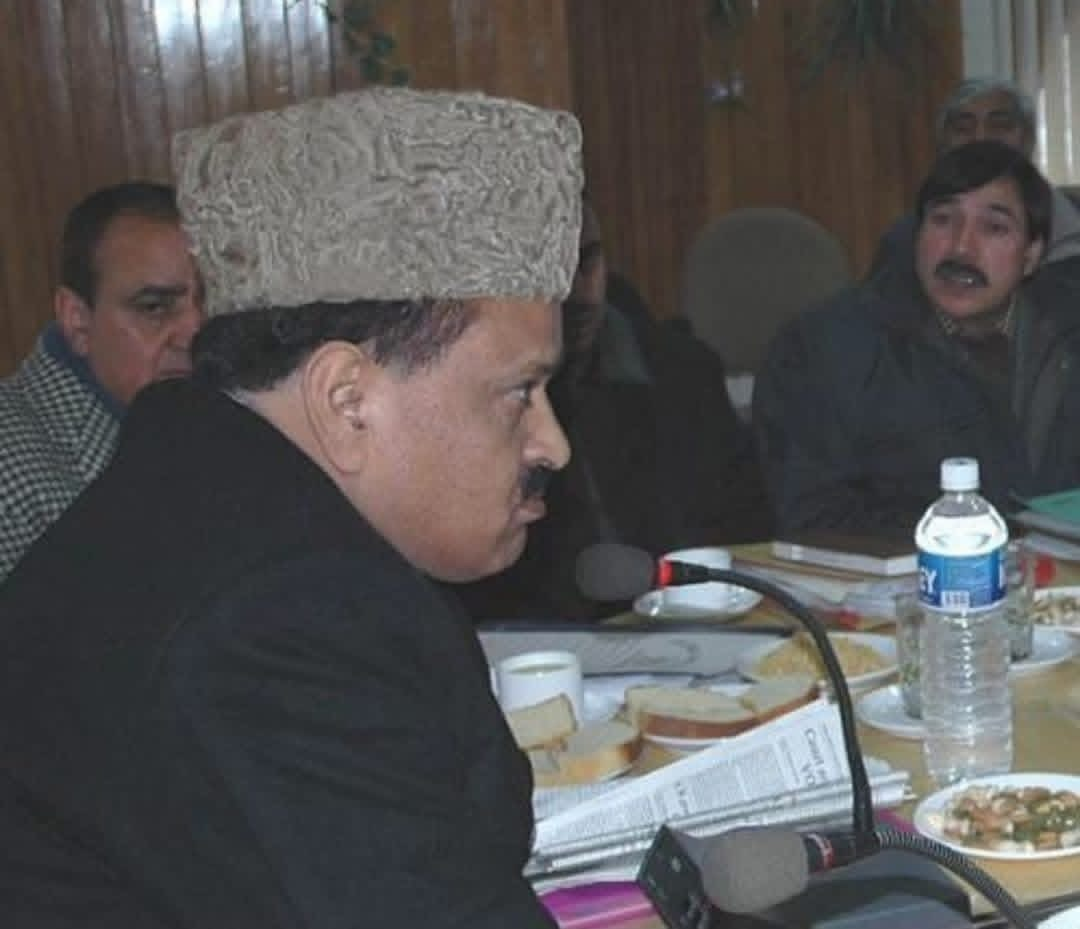
- Born: Nowpore Kalan Sopore; 1952 (age 73–74)
- Education: Aligarh Muslim University
- Political party: Jammu and Kashmir People's Conference
- Spouse: Amina Gani Wani (m. 1987)
- Children: 3 sons 1 daughter
- Parent: Haji Ghulam Rasool

Abdul Gani Vakil is a senior Indian politician from Jammu and Kashmir, currently serving as Senior Vice President of the Jammu and Kashmir Peoples Conference (JKPC). He is known for his long-standing political career, having transitioned from the Indian National Congress to the JKPC, and for his outspoken approach to political discourse. He previously served as Cabinet Minister for Social Welfare in the government led by Ghulam Nabi Azad.

== Political career ==
Abdul Gani Vakil was active in social work from his college days and began his political career in 1972. In 1977, he received a mandate from the Jammu and Kashmir National Conference to contest the Legislative Assembly elections. However, following the accord between Sheikh Abdullah and Indira Gandhi, he reconsidered his decision to contest the election on the National Conference ticket. He subsequently chose to align himself with a national political party and later joined the Indian National Congress.

He contested his first election in 1983 on a Congress Party ticket, with then Prime Minister Indira Gandhi campaigning in support of his candidature. In 1998, Vakil contested the parliamentary elections from the Baramulla–Kupwara constituency on the Indian National Congress ticket, replacing the sitting MP and veteran Congress leader Ghulam Rasool Kar, who was denied the party ticket. In the same election, Mufti Mohammad Sayeed contested from the Anantnag constituency in south Kashmir on the Congress ticket. During the campaign, Vakil alleged that he faced internal opposition from his then Congress colleague Taj Mohiuddin, which affected his campaign. Following these events, Taj Mohiuddin was expelled from the Indian National Congress for six years on charges of anti-party activities. He also remained the member of All India Congress Committee and Chief Spokesperson of Jammu Kashmir Pradesh Congress Committee.

Vakil has held several organisational positions within the Indian National Congress in Jammu and Kashmir, including General Secretary and Senior Vice President. He has represented India at international forums, including the Pugwash Conference in Pakistan on the Kashmir issue, and has participated in engagements in other countries, such as Russia and Sri Lanka. He was nominated by the Government of India as a member of the Central Silk Board, where he chaired meetings with senior officials to promote sericulture development, and was later appointed to the Board of Directors of the Ellaquai Dehati Bank.

He served as an observer for the 2012 Uttar Pradesh Legislative Assembly elections, working closely with Digvijay Singh, the Indian National Congress General Secretary in charge of the party’s campaign in the state and a former Chief Minister of Madhya Pradesh.

Vakil was conferred the Best Legislator Award for 2010–11 by the then Chief Minister of Jammu and Kashmir, Omar Abdullah, at a function held at the Legislative Assembly complex in 2011, in recognition of his performance in the House.

On 19 July 2015, he announced his resignation from Congress in protest against the Party High Command for appointing Ghulam Ahmed Mir as President of the Jammu and Kashmir Pradesh Congress Committee. He termed the appointment of Mir as an arbitrary and undemocratic decision and blamed the congress party for ruining the party in the state. He was considered a close associate of Ghulam Nabi Azad in the Indian National Congress, and after nearly four decades with the party, he resigned in July 2015.

In 2005, when Ghulam Nabi Azad became Chief Minister of Jammu and Kashmir, Vakil was the Congress nominee for the Rafiabad constituency, which was considered a safe seat. Vakil had narrowly lost the previous election in 2002 by 632 votes. At the time, Vakil was also a member of the Legislative Council, and the Rafiabad seat became strategically important as Azad planned to contest there after resignations in the constituency.

On 25 October 2017, Vakil launched his own political party, Jammu Kashmir Bachao Tehreek.

On 24 January 2019, Abdul Gani Vakil joined the Jammu and Kashmir People’s Conference in the presence of party chairman Sajad Gani Lone."Former minister Abdul Gani Vakil joins People's Conference". Business Standard. 24 January 2019.

On 22 February 2019, Vakil was appointed Senior Vice President of the Jammu and Kashmir People’s Conference.

Hours before the Bharatiya Janata Party‑led central government revoked the special status of Jammu and Kashmir by reading down Article 370, many mainstream political leaders were placed under detention or house arrest as part of a broader security operation. On 5 August 2019, Vakil was taken into preventive custody. He remained under restrictions at his residence in Tulsi Bagh until the restrictions on his movement were lifted on 19 September 2020, after 380 days of detention.

Vakil, as a senior leader of the Jammu and Kashmir People’s Conference, publicly criticized the People’s Alliance for Gupkar Declaration (PAGD), stating that the alliance lacked a clear roadmap and that its constituent parties had long been political rivals. In the interview, he also noted that there were internal disagreements over an electoral tie‑up within the PAGD, which placed pressure on party leadership, including Sajad Gani Lone, who was a spokesman for the alliance at the time.

On 19 January 2021, the Jammu and Kashmir People’s Conference, led by Sajad Gani Lone, decided to withdraw from the People’s Alliance for Gupkar Declaration (PAGD), citing the fielding of proxy candidates by constituent parties against officially mandated alliance candidates during the District Development Council (DDC) elections.

=== Political Views and Advocacy ===
Vakil has been a vocal critic of political alliances and government actions that he considers detrimental to the people of Jammu and Kashmir. He has publicly criticised the National Conference and the administration led by Omar Abdullah for what he described as administrative failures, particularly in relation to demolition drives in Kangan and Jammu, calling the “ignorance” of demolition orders by authorities “shocking, surprising, and deeply unfortunate.” He has also advocated for measures related to the restoration of Article 370.

Abdul Gani Vakil has been a vocal critic of corruption during his political career. In 2012, while serving as a senior leader of the Indian National Congress in Jammu and Kashmir, he publicly alleged large-scale corruption in government departments, particularly the Public Health Engineering (PHE), Irrigation, and Flood Control departments. Vakil stated that he was acting on the instructions of the Congress high command to expose corrupt practices and asserted that he would “leave no stone unturned” until the alleged scams were brought to light.

Vakil’s anti-corruption stance led to internal controversy within the Congress party. He openly criticised senior party leaders, including Taj Mohiuddin, accusing them of corruption and land encroachment. His statements highlighted what he described as rampant corruption within sections of the state administration and triggered public debate as well as internal party tensions.

He also criticised the state government for what he termed a weak response to corruption, arguing that oversight bodies such as the State Accountability Commission and the Vigilance Commission were ineffective. Vakil called for strict enforcement of anti-corruption laws and impartial action against politicians and bureaucrats accused of wrongdoing.

More broadly, Vakil has described corruption as a systemic issue that undermines governance and public welfare. He has consistently advocated greater administrative accountability, stronger anti-corruption institutions, and transparent investigations, maintaining that individuals facing credible allegations should be subject to due process irrespective of their political position. https://www.tribuneindia.com/2012/20120202/j&k.htm#6

Abdul Gani Vakil has contested multiple elections to the Jammu and Kashmir Legislative Assembly from the Rafiabad constituency. In the 2002 Assembly election, he secured 10,944 votes (33.1%) as a candidate of the Indian National Congress (INC). He finished second to Mohammad Dilawar Mir of the Jammu and Kashmir National Conference (JKN), who polled 11,576 votes (35.0%). The margin of defeat was 632 votes (1.9%).

In the 2008 Assembly election, Vakil again contested from Rafiabad in a triangular contest. Both Vakil and Mohammad Dilawar Mir were defeated by National Conference candidate Javid Ahmad Dar in a closely fought election.

In the 2014 Jammu and Kashmir Legislative Assembly election, Vakil secured 15,584 votes (28.1%) and finished second. The seat was won by Yawar Ahmad Mir of the Peoples Democratic Party (PDP), who polled 17,918 votes (32.3%), defeating Vakil by a margin of 2,334 votes. His repeated second-place finishes and substantial vote share in successive elections reflect his continued electoral presence in the constituency.

In the 2024 Assembly election, Vakil contested for the first time as a candidate of the Jammu and Kashmir Peoples Conference (JKPC), having previously been associated with the Indian National Congress. He was defeated in the election. Vakil attributed the decline in his vote share to the delimitation process, stating that his native village was shifted to another constituency following the redrawing of boundaries. https://www.indiavotes.com/ac/allcabdidateparty?stateac=32&emid=161&party=1&radio=ac

https://www.indiavotes.com/vidhan-sabha-details/2014/jammu-&-kashmir/rafiabad/32/35645/242

=== Role in JKPC ===
As a senior vice president, Vakil is an active voice within the party, frequently commenting on governance and policy issues. He has often criticised the National Conference (India)|National Conference and the administration led by Omar Abdullah for perceived administrative failures and has called for an all‑party meeting to press for the early restoration of statehood for Jammu and Kashmir.

== Personal life ==
Abdul Gani Vakil married Amina Wani in 1987, and they have two sons and a daughter.
