= Ghulam Nabi Dar =

Indian politician and former MLA

Member of the Jammu and Kashmir Legislative Assembly
- In office 1977–1987
- Preceded by: Abdul Razak Mir
- Succeeded by: Abdul Razak Mir
- Constituency: Kulgam

Personal details
- Party: Jammu & Kashmir National Conference

Ghulam Nabi Dar was an Indian politician and advocate. He was a member of Jammu & Kashmir National Conference (JKNC) and served two terms as the Member of Legislative Assembly from Kulgam constituency in 1977 and 1983.

== Personal life ==
According to his son, Imran Nabi, Dar survived many assassination attempts. Consequently, he moved to Srinagar in 1990's. He was once kidnapped by militants and was later released after negotiations. He is Survived by his Wife Mehmooda his two children Imran Nabi Dar and Muniza Nabi

== Political career ==
Dar contested his first election in 1977 from the Kulgam constituency, representing Jammu & Kashmir National Conference. He won the election with 2430 votes against Abdul Razak Mir. In the 1983 Jammu and Kashmir Legislative Assembly election, he again won against Sheikh Ghulam Hassan by 2880 votes. However, in 1987 Jammu and Kashmir Legislative Assembly election, he lost by 3576 against Abdul Razak Mir.

== Death ==
During an NC procession on 8 July 2006 in Kulgam, militants hurled a hand grenade onto the road. Dar was injured in the attack and was shifted to SMHS hospital, where he later succumbed to his injuries. The police alleged that Reyaz Ahmed lone, a Hizbul Mujahideen militant, was behind the attack and he was killed in a subsequent encounter in Anantnag.
