= Handwara =

Town in Jammu and Kashmir, India

- Town
- Location in Jammu and Kashmir, India Handwara (India)
- Coordinates: 34°23′59″N 74°16′54″E
- Country: India
- Union Territory: Jammu and Kashmir
- District: Kupwara

Government
  - Type: Municipal Committee
  - Body: Government of Jammu and Kashmir

Area
  - Total: 291.47 km^{2} (112.54 sq mi)

Population (2011)
  - Total: 13,600
  - Density: 46.7/km^{2} (121/sq mi)

Demographics
  - Literacy: 64.39%
  - Sex ratio: 843 ♀/ 1000 ♂

Languages
  - Official: Kashmiri, Urdu, Hindi, Dogri, English
- Time zone: UTC+5:30 (IST)
- PIN: 193221
- Vehicle registration: JK-09
- Website: kupwara.nic.in

Handwara (Urdu pronunciation: [ɦənd̪ʋɑːɽɑː] ; Kashmiri pronunciation: [hand̪ʋoːr]) is a town in Kupwara district of Jammu and Kashmir, India. It is located on Baramulla-Handwara National Highway NH-701 and is governed by a municipal committee.

== History ==
=== Sikh rule ===
During Sikh rule, Raja Zabardast Khan, chieftain of the Bomba tribe, led guerrilla warfare against the forces of the Sikh Empire, targeting their garrisons and posts in Handwara.

== Geography ==
Handwara is located at 34.40°N 74.28°E at an average elevation of 1,582 metres (5,190 feet) above sea level. The region boasts breathtaking natural beauty, with the Pohru River (locally called 'Talri river')—a tributary of the Jhelum—flowing through the town.

Famous volcanic peak, 'Soyamji' (1860 metres), locally known as 'Paput' is situated in North Machhipura (Handwara). It is known for its unique conical shape. It continued eruption of lava for about 13 months during 1934 and has been dormant since then.

== Demographics ==
Religion in Handwara Town (2011)
1. Islam (90.3%)
2. Hinduism (8.25%)
3. Sikhism (0.54%)
4. Christianity (0.51%)
5. Buddhism (0.02%)
6. Jainism (0.01%)
7. Others (0.04%)
8. Not stated (0.34%)

According to the 2011 Indian census, Handwara has a population of 13,600. Males constitute 54.26% of the population and females 45.74%. Handwara has an average literacy rate of 64.39%. The dominant religion in the town is Islam.

Historical population
| Year | Pop. | ±% p.a. |
|---|---|---|
| 1911 | 792 | — |
| 1971 | 5,025 | +3.13% |
| 1981 | 6,616 | +2.79% |
| 2001 | 10,638 | +2.40% |
| 2011 | 13,600 | +2.49% |

=== Literacy ===
The Census of 2011 showed the literacy rate of Handwara at 64.39%, lower than the national average of 67.16%. There is a gender difference in literacy, with a male literacy rate of 75.62% and a much lower female literacy rate of 51.88%.

== Educational Institutions ==
- Government Medical College, Handwara
- Government Degree College, Handwara
- Shaheen Public Secondary School, Handwara
- Industrial Training Institute

== Politics ==
Handwara is a region of considerable strategic significance, primarily due to its proximity to the Line of Control (LoC). This geographical positioning renders it a critical and sensitive zone in military and security discussions. Handwara was the home constituency of the late separatist leader Abdul Ghani Lone. The current MLA of Handwara is Sajjad Gani Lone of the Jammu and Kashmir People's Conference, who defeated Chowdhary Mohammad Ramzaan of the Jammu & Kashmir National Conference by over 600 votes in the 2024 assembly elections.

Municipal Committee Handwara is an Urban Local Body with 13 elected members, which administers the town.

| # | Name | Municipal Ward | Reservation Status | Party |
|---|---|---|---|---|
| 1 | Iram Amin Banday | Banday Mohalla | Women Open | Independent |
| 2 | Farooq Ahmad Bhat | Herpora | Open | Independent |
| 3 | Masroor Ah. Banday | Jamia Jadeed | Open | Independent |
| 4 | Dilshada Jan | Jamia Qadeem | Women Open | Independent |
| 5 | Gh. Mohd. Ganie | Khunabal Maqboolabad | Open | Independent |
| 6 | Bashir Ah. Khan | Khunabal Umerabad | Open | Independent |
| 7 | Zoona Behum | Durishpora | Women Open | Independent |
| 8 | Mumtaza Begum | Baghatpora | Open | Independent |
| 9 | Ateeqa Begum | Kachiwari | Open | Independent |
| 10 | Zamrooda Begum | Chotipora | Women Open | Independent |
| 11 | Mushtaq Ahmad Hanji | Tootigund | Open | Independent |
| 12 | Nazir Ahmed Bhat | Zalipora | Open | Independent |
| 13 | Ab. Majid Pandith | Wani Mohalla | Open | Independent |

== Notable people ==
- Ali Mohammad Shahbaz (Poet)
- Abdul Gani Lone (Politician)
- Sajad Lone (Politician)
- Engineer Rashid (Politician)
- Noor Mohammad (Singer)
