= Kulgam Assembly constituency =

Constituency of the Jammu and Kashmir legislative assembly in India

Coordinates: 33.65°N 75.02°E

Kulgam
- Constituency No. 39 for the Jammu and Kashmir Legislative Assembly

Constituency details
- Country: India
- State: Jammu and Kashmir
- District: Kulgam
- Lok Sabha constituency: Anantnag-Rajouri
- Established: 1962

Member of Legislative Assembly
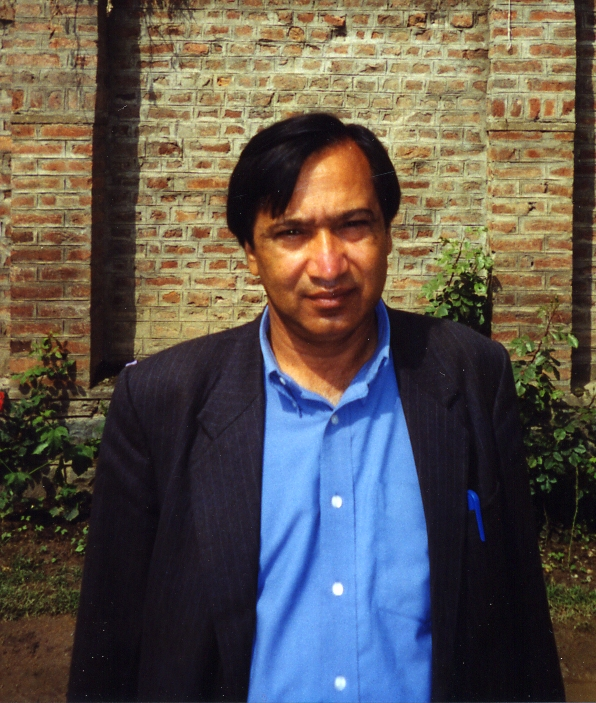
- Incumbent Mohammed Yousuf Tarigami
- Party: CPI(M)
- Elected year: 2024

Kulgam Assembly constituency is one of the 90 constituencies in the Jammu and Kashmir Legislative Assembly of Jammu and Kashmir a north state of India. Kulgam is also part of Anantnag-Rajouri Lok Sabha constituency.

== Members of Legislative Assembly ==
Year	Member	Party
1962	Mohammed Yaqub Bhat	Jammu & Kashmir National Conference
1967	Mohammed Yaqub Bhat	Indian National Congress
1972	Abdul Razak Mir	Jamaat-e-Islami
1977	Ghulam Nabi Dar	Jammu & Kashmir National Conference
1983	Ghulam Nabi Dar	Jammu & Kashmir National Conference
1987	Haji Abdul Razak Mir	Independent
1996	Mohammed Yousuf Tarigami	Communist Party of India (Marxist)
2002	Mohammed Yousuf Tarigami	Communist Party of India (Marxist)
2008	Mohammed Yousuf Tarigami	Communist Party of India (Marxist)
2014	Mohammed Yousuf Tarigami	Communist Party of India (Marxist)
2024	Mohammed Yousuf Tarigami	Communist Party of India (Marxist)

== Election results ==
=== Assembly Election 2024 ===
Major boundary change occurred between 2024 and 2014, comparisons may be not accurate.

2024 Jammu and Kashmir Legislative Assembly election : Kulgam
Party	Candidate	Votes	%	±%
CPI(M)	Mohamad Yousuf Tarigami	33,634	44.86%	▲6.17
Independent	Sayar Ahmad Reshi	25,796	34.40%	New
JKPDP	Mohammed Amin Dar	7,561	10.08%	▼27.98
JKAP	Mohammad Aaqib Dar	2,726	3.64%	New
Independent	Zaman Irshad Parry	993	1.32%	New
Jammu and Kashmir National Panthers Party (Bhim)	Sudarshan Singh	778	1.04%	New
Aman Aur Shanti Tehreek-E-Jammu and Kashmir	Abdul Ahad Mir	646	0.86%	New
NOTA	None of the Above	1,358	1.81%	▲0.54
Margin of victory		7,838	10.45%	▲9.83
Turnout		74,978	63.91%	▲7.55
Registered electors		1,17,322		▲24.33
CPI(M) hold		Swing	▲6.17	

=== Assembly Election 2014 ===
2014 Jammu and Kashmir Legislative Assembly election : Kulgam
Party	Candidate	Votes	%	±%
CPI(M)	Mohamad Yousuf Tarigami	20,574	38.69%	▲4.45
JKPDP	Nazir Ahmad Laway	20,240	38.06%	▲4.29
JKNC	Imran Nabi Dar	8,273	15.56%	▲4.01
BJP	Ghulam Hassan Zargar	1,944	3.66%	New
INC	Peer Nazim-Ud-Din	519	0.98%	New
Independent	Towseef Ahmad Shah	483	0.91%	New
Independent	Rashida Mir	350	0.66%	New
NOTA	None of the Above	674	1.27%	New
Margin of victory		334	0.63%	▲0.16
Turnout		53,178	56.36%	▼5.26
Registered electors		94,362		▲15.90
CPI(M) hold		Swing	▲4.45	

=== Assembly Election 2008 ===
2008 Jammu and Kashmir Legislative Assembly election : Kulgam
Party	Candidate	Votes	%	±%
CPI(M)	Mohamad Yousuf Tarigami	17,175	34.24%	▼17.48
JKPDP	Nazir Ahmad Laway	16,939	33.77%	▲15.11
JKNC	Safder Ali Khan	5,792	11.55%	▼9.90
Independent	Mohmad Ayoub Dar	2,116	4.22%	New
Independent	Peer Nizam Ud Din	1,344	2.68%	New
Independent	Mohmad Yousuf Lone	975	1.94%	New
Independent	Rashida Akbar	829	1.65%	New
Margin of victory		236	0.47%	▼29.80
Turnout		50,163	61.61%	▲37.22
Registered electors		81,414		▲23.06
CPI(M) hold		Swing	▼17.48	

=== Assembly Election 2002 ===
2002 Jammu and Kashmir Legislative Assembly election : Kulgam
Party	Candidate	Votes	%	±%
CPI(M)	Mohamad Yousuf Tarigami	8,346	51.72%	▼17.94
JKNC	Ghulam Nabi Dar	3,461	21.45%	New
JKPDP	Mohammed Yousf Lone	3,011	18.66%	New
RJD	Abdul Rashid Lone	503	3.12%	New
BJP	Manzoor Ahmed	493	3.05%	New
Independent	Ramesh Kumar Bhat	324	2.01%	New
Margin of victory		4,885	30.27%	▼21.29
Turnout		16,138	24.40%	▼32.31
Registered electors		66,159		▲19.65
CPI(M) hold		Swing	▼17.94	

=== Assembly Election 1996 ===
1996 Jammu and Kashmir Legislative Assembly election : Kulgam
Party	Candidate	Votes	%	±%
CPI(M)	Mohamad Yousuf Tarigami	21,837	69.65%	▲59.43
JD	Habibullah Laway	5,671	18.09%	New
JKAL	Mohammed Ismail Bhat	2,745	8.76%	New
INC	Abdul Aziz Zargar	1,098	3.50%	New
Margin of victory		16,166	51.56%	▲40.12
Turnout		31,351	59.65%	▼20.87
Registered electors		55,292		▲37.26
CPI(M) gain from Independent		Swing	▲19.71	

=== Assembly Election 1987 ===
1987 Jammu and Kashmir Legislative Assembly election : Kulgam
Party	Candidate	Votes	%	±%
Independent	Haji Abdul Razak Mir	15,607	49.95%	New
JKNC	Ghulam Nabi Dar	12,031	38.50%	▲0.47
CPI(M)	Mohamad Yousuf Tarigami	3,196	10.23%	▲1.75
Independent	Mohammed Yousuf Wani	413	1.32%	New
Margin of victory		3,576	11.44%	▲0.18
Turnout		31,247	79.97%	▲1.10
Registered electors		40,282		▲20.49
Independent gain from JKNC		Swing	▲11.92	

=== Assembly Election 1983 ===
1983 Jammu and Kashmir Legislative Assembly election : Kulgam
Party	Candidate	Votes	%	±%
JKNC	Ghulam Nabi Dar	9,723	38.03%	▼4.60
JI	Sheikh Ghulam Hassan	6,843	26.77%	▼4.14
INC	Habib Ullah Laway	5,002	19.57%	▲10.63
CPI(M)	Mohamad Yousuf Tarigami	2,168	8.48%	New
JKNC	Mohammed Yaqoob	1,051	4.11%	▼38.52
Independent	Abdul Majid Khan	302	1.18%	New
Independent	Ghulam Mohd. Bandey	190	0.74%	New
Margin of victory		2,880	11.26%	▼0.46
Turnout		25,566	79.98%	▲4.14
Registered electors		33,431		▲16.72
JKNC hold		Swing	▼4.60	

=== Assembly Election 1977 ===
1977 Jammu and Kashmir Legislative Assembly election : Kulgam
Party	Candidate	Votes	%	±%
JKNC	Ghulam Nabi Dar	8,833	42.63%	New
JI	Abdul Razak Mir	6,403	30.91%	▼7.76
JP	Mohammad Yaqub Bhat	2,944	14.21%	New
INC	Habibullah Laway	1,851	8.93%	▼18.70
Independent	Ghulam Mohammad Banday	442	2.13%	New
Independent	Mohan Lal	245	1.18%	New
Margin of victory		2,430	11.73%	▲6.77
Turnout		20,718	74.92%	▲8.46
Registered electors		28,643		▼13.07
JKNC gain from JI		Swing	▲3.97	

=== Assembly Election 1972 ===
1972 Jammu and Kashmir Legislative Assembly election : Kulgam
Party	Candidate	Votes	%	±%
JI	Abdul Razak Mir	8,137	38.66%	New
Independent	Habibullah Laway	7,094	33.71%	New
INC	Mohammed Yaqub Bhat	5,815	27.63%	New
Margin of victory		1,043	4.96%	
Turnout		21,046	68.63%	▲63.87
Registered electors		32,951		▲14.70
JI gain from INC		Swing		

=== Assembly Election 1967 ===
1967 Jammu and Kashmir Legislative Assembly election : Kulgam
Party	Candidate	Votes	%	±%
INC	M. Y. Bhat	Unopposed		
Registered electors		28,729		▲15.25
INC gain from JKNC		Swing		

=== Assembly Election 1962 ===
1962 Jammu and Kashmir Legislative Assembly election : Kulgam
Party	Candidate	Votes	%	±%
JKNC	Mohammed Yaqub Bhat	Unopposed		
Registered electors		24,928		
JKNC win (new seat)				

== See also ==
- Kulgam
- Kulgam district
- List of constituencies of Jammu and Kashmir Legislative Assembly
