= Ali Mohammad Shahbaz =

Kashmiri Poet

Ali Mohammad Qureshi Shahbaz
- Born: 1 May 1939; Shatgund payeen Handwara, Jammu and Kashmir, British India
- Died: 4 July 1996 (aged 57); Hangah, Handwara, Jammu and Kashmir, India
- Education: Master's degree
- Occupations: Poet, writer, teacher
- Writing career
- Language: Kashmiri

Ali Mohammad Shahbaz, (born Ali Mohammad Qureshi, 1939 – 1996) known by his pen name Shahbaz, was a Kashmiri-language revolutionary poet, satirist, humanist, philanthropist, calligrapher, and teacher. His literary work revolved around the conflict in Kashmir.

== Early life ==
Ali Mohammad Shahbaz was born on 1 May 1939 at his ancestral resident Mawer (Langate), a village in Handwara town of North Kashmir's Kupwara district. He had his primary school education from Islamia Model School, Qalamabad and completed high school at Handwara. He has done masters in the Kashmiri language.

== Personal life ==
Shahbaz was a teacher by profession and was appointed as the Principal of Government Boys Higher Secondary School Handwara until his death. His father, Gh Mohammad Quershi was a cleric, who died when Shahbaz was in teens. Shahbaz turned to poetry at a very tender age. He was tremendously influenced by his teacher Shahlal Bahar. Bahar was the Vice President of Adbee Markaz Kamraz, member cultural academy Srinagar and Sahitya Academy, New Delhi.

== His poetry in music field ==
Kashmiri singers have sung most of Shahbaz's gazals and one among them is broadcast on Radio Kashmir almost every morning.

His poetry have been sung at national level by singer Noor Mohammad titled "Janaan" (11 November 2020) and "Baliye" (9 April 2021) which have been released by Zee Music Company at the Online Video Platform YouTube.

== Death ==
Shahbaz was shot dead by an unidentified gunmen on 4 July 1996 at his native village Hangah Langate. An award is named in his honour.

== Bibliography ==
- Ali Mohammad Shahbaz (Monograph on the Kashmiri Poet), Enayat Gul
