= Shabnam Gani Lone =

Jammu and Kashmir politician and lawyer

- Education: University of Kashmir; Aligarh Muslim University
- Occupations: Advocate, Political analyst
- Father: Abdul Ghani Lone
- Relatives: Sajjad Ghani Lone (brother)

Shabnum Gani Lone is an Indian Kashmiri woman analyst, politician and lawyer at Supreme Court of India. She is the younger daughter of Abdul Ghani Lone, a separatist leader who was killed in a rally in Srinagar in 2002.

== Education and career ==
She completed her graduation in English from Kashmir University and then pursued law from Aligarh Muslim University. She practised law at the Jammu and Kashmir Bar for three years before moving to Delhi. After the assassination of her father. In 2007 she joined politics. In the general election, 2008, she stood as an independent candidate but lost it with a narrow margin to the member of Jammu and Kashmir Legislative Assembly election, 2008.

Being an activist, Shabnum was held hostage by unidentified gunmen in Srinagar, and was booked under TADA by government of Jammu and Kashmir.

Shabnam Lone, who is a lawyer in Supreme Court of India is elder sister of Sajjad Gani Lone, who was a minister in Jammu and Kashmir.

== Awards and recognition ==
- Shabnum Ghani Lone has been awarded by American Bibliographic Institute as 'Outstanding Woman of the Millennium'.
