= Nazir Ahmad Laway =

Indian politician

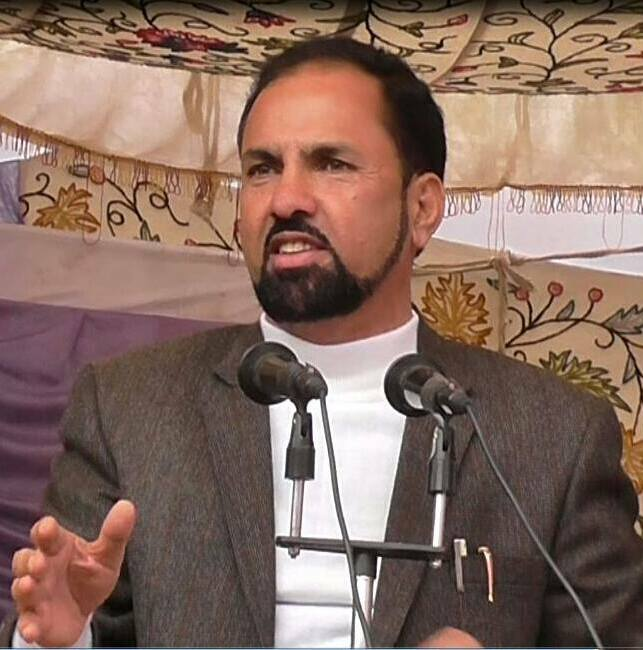

Member of Parliament, Rajya Sabha
- In office 16 February 2015 – 15 Febuaray 2021
- Succeeded by: Chowdry Mohammad Ramzan
- Constituency: Jammu and Kashmir

Personal details
- Born: 5 November 1963 (age 62) Hanad Chawalgam, Kulgam, Jammu & Kashmir
- Party: J&K Peoples Conference
- Spouse: Parveena Nazir
- Children: 3
- Profession: Politician

Nazir Ahmad Laway (born 5 November 1963) is an Indian politician and former member of Rajya Sabha from erstwhile state of Jammu and Kashmir.

He lost his election by only few votes to Yusuf Tairgami(CPI). After that he was elected as the Member of parliament. His term of Member of Parliament, Rajya Sabha representing the state of Jammu & Kashmir in Rajya Sabha ended on 15 February 2021. On 1 November, he was expelled through an anonymous press release from J&KPDP for anti-party activities as he attended the swearing-in ceremony of first Lt. Governor of Jammu and Kashmir, Girish Chandra Murmu. He strongly opposed the move of Central Government in Parliament when Article 370 & 35 A were abrogated on 5 November 2019. He joined Jammu and Kashmir People's Conference party after being expelled from Jammu and Kashmir Peoples Democratic Party.

In December 2022, he was appointed as vice president of J&K peoples conference.
