= District Development Council =

Indian political system

District Development Councils

Type
- Type: Development Councils of the Districts of Jammu and Kashmir

A District Development Council (abbreviated as DDC) is a form of elected local government in Jammu and Kashmir facilitated by the Jammu and Kashmir Panchayati Raj Act, 1989 and created under Jammu and Kashmir Panchayati Raj Rule, 1996 of the constitution of India. They are primarily aimed at electing the members from the rural and urban areas for the District Planning Committee and the councils themselves with fourteen members from each district for speedy development and economic upliftment.

Each council have additional district development commissioner (Additional D. C.) as chief executive officer and the chairperson of the council representing the district. It works at district-level for the term of five years until new DDC elections are announced or held. It also replaced District Planning and Development Boards (DDB), which was implemented in erstwhile state of Jammu and Kashmir in 1954 to perform its functions such as formulation of periodic and annual plans for the development of a district.

== Functions ==
- To formulate, prepare, approve a plan or capital expenditure for respective districts
- To organize general meetings after every three months designed to suggest a new plan or to process pending plans
- To supervise the activities of gram panchayats, Block Development Council and panchayat samiti in its own jurisdiction at district-level
- To utilize the development aid or government funds for the development of an entire district
- To implement the schemes sponsored by the government of India
- To receive the district development plans compiled and formulated by the Block Development Council and submit it to the District Planning Committee "for adherence to the government guidelines, norms and rules"

== Composition ==
A council consists of fourteen members elected from the countryside and also from the built-up areas where needed or approved by the Election Commission of India. Its chairperson and vice-chairperson are selected by its members; however all the elected members, including chairperson and vice-chairperson are literally headed by a government revenue officer such as additional district development commissioner.

DDCs work jointly with District Planning Committee (DPC) and Block Development Council from each district. Since they work jointly with the other committees or councils, a jurisdiction's DDC consists of a member of parliament, member of state legislator, chairperson of town hall or municipal committee, and the president of a municipal corporation.

== Creation and elections ==
District Development Councils were first introduced by the Ministry of Home Affairs on 16 October 2020, fourteen months after the special status of Jammu and Kashmir was revoked by the parliament of India on 5 August 2019, leading the government of India to limit the powers of the Jammu and Kashmir Legislative Assembly and to run the union territory under the union government's rule administered by a lieutenant governor.

DDCs supervises, implement, sponsor and prepare for five main fields such as welfare, health, education, finance, public works and development intended to ensure the community development of a representing district.

=== DDCs before 2020 elections ===
DDCs have been existent in Jammu and Kashmir before the 2020 elections in the form of District Planning and Development Boards, but their members were not elected and rather selected by the state government of the erstwhile state of Jammu and Kashmir. In 2020, Government of India decided to hold elections to these councils in order to bring more democracy at the Panchayati raj level and have its members more accountable to the people.

=== 2020 DDC elections ===
The first DDC elections in the history of Jammu and Kashmir were held from 28 November 2020 in eight phases across the two-hundred and eighty DDC constituencies. People's Alliance for Gupkar Declaration (PAGD) won 110 seats while BJP emerged as the single largest party by winning 75 seats. But later on 19 January, the JKPC left the PAGD, which brought down the PAGD's seat tally from 110 to 102, as JKPC had won 8 seats.

2020 Jammu & Kashmir DDC Election Detailed Results
| Alliance | Party | Seats | % |
|---|---|---|---|
| PAGD | JKNC | 67 | |
| PAGD | JKPDP | 27 | |
| PAGD | JKPC | 8 | |
| PAGD | CPI(M) | 5 | |
| PAGD | JKPM | 3 | |
| PAGD | JKANC | 0 | |
| NDA | BJP | 75 | |
| UPA | INC | 26 | |
| None | Independents | 50 | |
| None | JKAP | 12 | |
| None | JKPDF(S) | 2 | |
| None | JKNPP | 2 | |
| None | BSP | 1 | |
| Total | | 278/280 | 51.76% |

Some of the opposition's leaders of Jammu and Kashmir were arrested under detention laws prior to the elections.

The counting of votes in two DDC constituencies has been kept in abeyance as two of the candidates in them are reportedly from Pakistani administered Kashmir. An Apni Party backed Independent won in one, while JKNC backed Independent won in the other seat.

==== Defections of elected candidates ====
The elected members of DDC defected from one party to another as the process of voting for the post of DDC Chairman and Vice-Chairman began. 2 elected DDC members from Jammu & Kashmir National Conference left the party and joined Jammu and Kashmir Apni Party. Apart from this several independent DDC members also joined Jammu and Kashmir Apni Party before the voting for DDC Chairman had begun.

== DDC Chairpersons ==
Every DDC consists of a DDC Chairman and Vice-Chairman. The elections for this post in each DDC began from 6 February 2021 till 20 February 2021. Since each DDC has 14 members, the winning candidate requires the support of minimum 8 DDC members in that council. The election for this post also requires quorum which is minimum of 10 members for the election to take place. On 6 April 2021 Government of Jammu and Kashmir issued fresh warrant of precedence in which DDC Chairpersos were placed as equivalent to Minister of State with in their respective territorial jurisdictions, above Member of parliament, Member of the Legislative Assembly (India) and Chief secretary (India) and Vice Chairpersons equivalent to Administrative Secretaries within their respective jurisdictions in Jammu and Kashmir (union territory)

| S.No | District | Chairperson | Vice-Chairperson | Political Party | Alliance |
|---|---|---|---|---|---|
| 1 | Kulgam | Mohd Afzal Parrey | Shazia Jan | Communist Party of India (Marxist) | People's Alliance for Gupkar Declaration |
| 2 | Srinagar | Aftab Malik | Bilal Ahmad | Jammu and Kashmir Apni Party | None |
| 3 | Shopian | Bilquees Bano | Irfan Manhas | Jammu and Kashmir Apni Party | None |
| 4 | Jammu | Bharat Bhushan | Suraj Singh | Bharatiya Janata Party | None |
| 5 | Kathua | Col (Retd) Mahan Singh | Raghunandan Singh | Bharatiya Janata Party | None |
| 6 | Doda | Dhananter Singh Kotwal | Sangeeta Bhagat | Bharatiya Janata Party | None |
| 7 | Reasi | Saraf Singh Nag | Sajra Qadir (IND.) | Bharatiya Janata Party | None |
| 8 | Samba | Keshav Dutt Sharma | Balwan Singh | Bharatiya Janata Party | None |
| 9 | Udhampur | Lal Chand Bhagat | Juhi Singh Manhas | Bharatiya Janata Party | None |
| 10 | Budgam | Nazir Ahmad Khan | Nazir Jahara (NC) | Independent politician | None |
| 11 | Poonch | Tazeem Akhter | Md Ashfaq | Independent politician | None |
| 12 | Baramulla | Safina Baig | Sanauleah Parray | Jammu & Kashmir People's Conference | None |
| 13 | Kupwara | Irfan Panditpuri | Haji Md Farooq | Jammu & Kashmir People's Conference | None |
| 14 | Kishtwar | Pooja Thakur | Saima Parveen (INC) | Jammu & Kashmir National Conference | People's Alliance for the Gupkar Declaration |
| 15 | Ganderbal | Nuzhat Ishfaq | Bilal Sheikh (PDP) | Jammu & Kashmir National Conference | People's Alliance for the Gupkar Declaration |
| 16 | Anantnag | Yousuf Gorsi | Javaidhmad (PDP) | Jammu & Kashmir National Conference | People's Alliance for the Gupkar Declaration |
| 17 | Bandipore | Abdul Gani Bhat (NC) | Kousar Shafeeq (INC) | Jammu & Kashmir National Conference | People's Alliance for the Gupkar Declaration |
| 18 | Rajouri | Naseem Liaqat (PDP) | Shabir Khan | Jammu & Kashmir Peoples Democratic Party | People's Alliance for the Gupkar Declaration |
| 19 | Pulwama | Syed Abdul Bari Andrabi (PDP) | Mukhtar Ahmad Bandh (JKNC) | Jammu & Kashmir Peoples Democratic Party | People's Alliance for the Gupkar Declaration |
| 20 | Ramban | Dr. Shamshada Shan (JKNC) | Mrs. Rabia Beigh (INDEPENDENT) | Jammu & Kashmir National Conference | People's Alliance for the Gupkar Declaration |

== Membership by council ==
=== Kashmir Division ===
==== Kulgam DDC ====
DDC Kulgam

- DDC Chairperson Kulgam: Mohd Afzal Parrey (CPI(M))
- Vice-chairperson: Shazia Jan (JKNC)

| S.No | Party | Alliance | No. of Members |
|---|---|---|---|
| 1. | Communist Party of India (Marxist) | PAGD | 5 |
| 2. | JKNC | PAGD | 5 |
| 3. | JKPDP | PAGD | 2 |
| 4. | Indian National Congress | United Progressive Alliance | 2 |
| Total | | | 14 |

==== Anantnag DDC ====
- Chairperson: Yousuf Gorsi (JKNC)
- Vice-chairpwrson: Javaid Ahmad (JKPDP)

| S.No | Party | Alliance | No. of Members |
|---|---|---|---|
| 1. | INC | UPA | 2 |
| 2. | JKNC | PAGD | 6 |
| 3. | JKPDP | PAGD | 4 |
| 4. | Independent | | 2 |
| Total | | | 14 |

==== Budgam DDC ====
- DDC Chairperson Budgam: Nazir Ahmad Khan (IND)
- Vice-chairperson: Nazir Ahmad Jahara (JKNC)

| S.No | Party | Alliance | No. of Members |
|---|---|---|---|
| 1. | JKPDP | PAGD | 1 |
| 2. | JKNC | PAGD | 8 |
| 3. | JKPDF | | 2 |
| 4. | JKPM | | 1 |
| 5. | Independent | | 2 |
| Total | | | 14 |

==== Bandipora DDC ====
- DDC Chairperson Bandipora: Abdul Gani Bhat (JKNC)
- Vice-chairperson: Kaunser Shafeeq (INC)

| S.No | Party | Alliance | No. of Members |
|---|---|---|---|
| 1. | INC | UPA | 1 |
| 2. | BJP | NDA | 1 |
| 3. | JKNC | PAGD | 4 |
| 4. | JKPDP | PAGD | 2 |
| 5. | JKAP | | 1 |
| 6. | JKPM | | 1 |
| 7. | Independent | | 4 |
| Totak | | | 14 |

==== Pulwama DDC ====
- DDC Chairperson Pulwama: Syed Abdul Bari Andrabi (JKPDP)
- Mukhtar Ahmad Bandh of (JKNC) was elected from Litter constituency and became Vice‑Chairperson of Pulwama DDC.

| S.No | Party | Alliance | No. of Members |
|---|---|---|---|
| 1. | INC | UPA | |
| 2. | BJP | NDA | 1 |
| 3. | JKNC | PAGD | 2 |
| 4. | JKPDP | PAGD | 8 |
| 5. | JKAP | | |
| 6. | JKPM | | |
| 7. | Independent | | 4 |
| Totak | | | 14 |
