= Democratic Janata Dal (Jammu and Kashmir) =

Political party in Jammu and Kashmir

The Democratic Janata Dal is a political party in Jammu and Kashmir. DJD had merged with the Jammu & Kashmir National Conference in 1998, but on 3 February 1999 DJD was revived as a separate party. The party president is Ghulam Qadir Wani and the general secretary is Yograj Singh.
