= People's Alliance for Gupkar Declaration =

- Abbreviation: PAGD
- Chairman: Farooq Abdullah
- Spokesperson: Mohammed Yousuf Tarigami
- Founder: Farooq Abdullah; Mehbooba Mufti
- Founded: 20 October 2020
- Dissolved: 2024
- Headquarters: Srinagar, Jammu and Kashmir
- Ideology: Restoration of Article 370 and Article 35A
- Political position: Big tent
- Alliance: 4 parties

Party flag

Website
- https://twitter.com/JKPAGD

The People's Alliance for Gupkar Declaration (PAGD) was a political alliance between several political parties in Jammu and Kashmir campaigning for autonomy for the region by restoring special status along with Article 35A of the erstwhile state of Jammu and Kashmir. It was dissolved in 2024. Farooq Abdullah was president and Mohammed Yousuf Tarigami was the convener and spokesperson of the pact.

== Background ==
On 5 August 2019, the Parliament of India revoked Article 370 of the Constitution of India, the temporary special status of Jammu and Kashmir, thereby ending the limited autonomy the state enjoyed in affairs other than foreign affairs, defence and communication, etc. Further, the state was re-organised and evolved into two new union territories, Jammu and Kashmir in the west and Ladakh in the east.

The BJP-led Government of India had placed major political leaders of the state including former Chief Ministers Farooq Abdullah, Omar Abdullah and Mehbooba Mufti under house arrest, and suspended internet services across the state.

== Member parties ==
Party	Flag	Abbr.	Leader
Jammu & Kashmir National Conference		JKNC	Farooq Abdullah
Jammu and Kashmir People's Democratic Party		JKPDP	Mehbooba Mufti
Communist Party of India (Marxist)		CPI(M)	Collective leadership
Jammu and Kashmir Awami National Conference		JKANC	Begum Khalida Shah

=== Former members ===
- Jammu and Kashmir People's Conference (JKPC) (2020-21)
- Jammu & Kashmir People's Movement (JKPM) (2020-22)

== Gupkar declarations ==
=== First declaration ===
On 4 August 2019, the following leaders met at Gupkar Residence:

- Farooq Abdullah (chair)
- Mehbooba Mufti (vice-chair)
- Muzaffar Hussain Baig
- Abdul Rehman Veeri
- Sajad Ghani Lone
- Imran Reza Ansari
- Abdul Ghani Vakeel
- Taj Mohiudin
- Mohammed Yousuf Tarigami
- Omar Abdullah
- Mohamad Akbar Lone
- Nasir Aslam Wani
- Shah Faesal
- Ali Mohammad Sagar
- Muzaffar Shah
- Uzair Ronga
- Suhail Bukhari

The first Gupkar Declaration was unanimously passed by all present as a baseline:

It was unanimously resolved:

1. That all the parties would be united in their resolve to protect and defend the identity, autonomy and special status of J&K against all attacks and onslaughts whatsoever.

2. That modification, abrogation of Articles 35A, 370, unconstitutional delimitation or trifurcation of the State would be an aggression against the people of Jammu, Kashmir and Ladakh.

3. That the parties participating in the meeting resolved to seek audience with the President and Prime Minister of India and the leaders of other political parties to apprise them of the current situation and make an appeal to them to safeguard the legitimate interests of the people of the State with regard to the guarantees given to the State by the Constitution of our country.

=== Second declaration ===
The second Gupkar Declaration, was signed on 22 August 2020 by seven political parties, including National Conference, People's Democratic Party, Communist Party of India (Marxist), Jammu and Kashmir People's Conference, Awami National Conference, Indian National Congress and Jammu & Kashmir People's Movement. The signatories once again asserted that they were bound by the status quo of 4 August 2019. The Gupkar declaration and parties would strive for the restoration of Article 370 and Article 35A.

On 17 November 2020, the Indian National Congress denied their involvement with the PAGD. Their Jammu and Kashmir leadership claimed that they may pursue a state-level electoral alliance but denied that they are signatories of the proclamations. The Congress Party also condemned Mehbooba Mufti's comments on abandoning the Indian Tricolour as well as Farooq Abdullah's statements asking for foreign interference into India's internal matters.

=== District Development Council (DDC) Results ===
In the 2020 Jammu and Kashmir District Development Council (DDC) elections, the People’s Alliance for Gupkar Declaration (PAGD) secured a majority in several districts.

In Pulwama district, Mukhtar Ahmad Bandh of the Jammu and Kashmir National Conference (JKNC), a PAGD constituent, was elected as a DDC member and later chosen as the Vice-Chairperson of the Pulwama DDC. His election reflected PAGD's grassroots support in South Kashmir.

=== Later developments ===
On 19 January 2021, the Jammu and Kashmir People's Conference announced that it was pulling out of the alliance, citing differences with the member parties. On 4 July 2022, Jammu & Kashmir People's Movement left the alliance citing lack of a clear roadmap.

In 2023 the alliance members joined the newly formed Indian National Developmental Inclusive Alliance which is led by Indian National Congress on the national level to contest the upcoming 2024 Lok Sabha election together. But the alliance partners failed to reach a seat sharing agreement before the elections and ended up contesting separately within the state.

After the national election the alliance members once again failed to reach a seat sharing agreement before the state legislative election held in 2024, ten years after the last state election and again contested the elections separately, which effectively ended the alliance as an electoral or political force within the state.

== Symbols ==
The alliance used the flag of the former State of Jammu and Kashmir as an official symbol.

== See also ==
- Indian National Developmental Inclusive Alliance
- All Jammu and Kashmir Plebiscite Front

== External ==
- Official Twitter feed
