= Abdul Ghani Lone =

Kashmiri Pro-Indenence Leader

Abdul Gani Lone
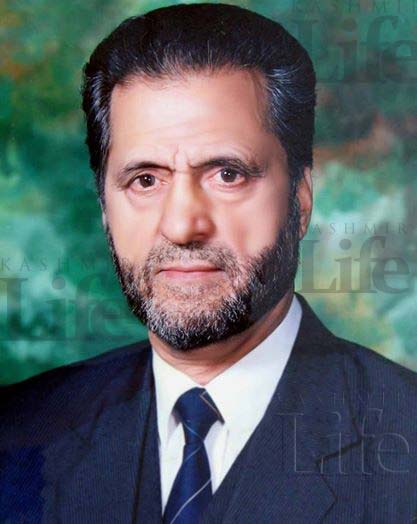

Former Cabinet Minister of Education and Health (J&K)
- Chief Minister: Syed Mir Qasim

Former Deputy Minister of, Law, Irrigation, Flood control, Animal husbandry and Power

Personal details
- Born: 6 May 1932 Dard Harie, Kupwara , Jammu & Kashmir, British India
- Died: 21 May 2002 (aged 70) Srinagar, Jammu and Kashmir
- Cause of death: Assassination
- Party: Jammu and Kashmir People's Conference
- Other political affiliations: Jammu and Kashmir People's Independence Conference
- Children: Bilal Lone; Sajjad Lone; Shabnam Gani Lone
- Occupation: lawyer, Politician

Abdul Gani Lone (/ˈɑːbdʊl ˈɡɑːni ˈloʊn/ AHB-duul GAH-nee LOHN; 6 May 1932 – 21 May 2002) was an Indian political leader.

== Life ==
Lone was born in Dard Harie in the Kralpora tehsil of the Kupwara district of the princely state of Kashmir and Jammu in British India into a Kashmiri Muslim family. He earned a law degree from Aligarh Muslim University in 1957.

His sons Bilal Lone and Sajjad Lone are Kashmiri politicians. Sajjad Lone was a member of the Legislative Assembly. His daughter Shabnam Gani Lone is a lawyer at the Supreme Court of India, while his eldest daughter Safiya Lone, a teacher by profession, died on 22 October 2017.

== Career ==
He made his entry into politics serving in the state assembly as a Congress candidate in 1967. In 1978, he formed a Kashmiri separatist organization called People's Conference dedicated to "the restoration of 'internal autonomy' in Kashmir."

== Electoral performance ==
Election	Constituency	Party	Result	Votes %	Opposition Candidate	Opposition Party	Opposition vote %	Ref
1987	Handwara	JKPC	Lost	43.88%	Chowdary Mohammed Ramzan	JKNC	46.93%	
1983	Handwara	JKPC	Lost	45.46%	Chowdary Mohammed Ramzan	JKNC	45.48%	
1977	Handwara	JP	Won	51.78%	Sharif Ud Din	JKNC	44.73%	
1972	Handwara	INC	Won	88.41%	Sharif Ud Din	Independent	11.59%	
1967	Handwara	INC	Won	Elected Unopposed				

== Death ==
Lone and his guards were gunned down by two young assassins before they threw grenades and escaped on 21 May 2002 while commemorating the twelfth death anniversary of Kashmiri leader, Mirwaiz Maulvi Farooq. Eyewitnesses said that earlier in the day a group of youths arrived at the Idgah, shouting pro-Pakistan slogans, and two of them fired on Lone.

Jammu and Kashmir Chief Minister Farooq Abdullah said "Pakistan wants Kashmir and so is desperate in its action, which this killing has proved." The then Prime Minister of India, Atal Bihari Vajpayee, said, "Mr. Lone was assassinated because he was working for peace in Jammu and Kashmir."

His son Sajjad Lone said separatist leader Syed Ali Shah Geelani and Pakistani spy agency ISI were responsible for his father's death, then later said Abdullah had provided inadequate security to his father.

The United States condemned the assassination, with Secretary of State Colin Powell issuing a statement, calling Lone a moderate who sought a peaceful resolution of the Kashmir issue.

== See also ==
- List of assassinated Indian politicians
