= Jammu and Kashmir Panchayati Raj Act, 1989 =

Jammu and Kashmir Legislature
- Long title: An Act to provide for the constitutions of Halqa Panchayats, Block Development Councils and The District Planning And Development Boards and matters concerned therewith.
- Citation: Act No. XI of 1989
- Territorial extent: Jammu and Kashmir
- Commenced: 8 July 1989

Amended by
- J&K Panchayati Raj Rules, 1996; 2020 amendments

Keywords
- Panchayati Raj
- Status: Amended

Jammu and Kashmir Panchayati Raj Act, 1989 provides for Panchayati Raj in Jammu and Kashmir as an instrument of a local self government. This act preceded the 73rd constitutional amendment which gave constitutional status to PRI's in India.

== District Development Councils ==
On 16 October 2020, the Ministry of Home Affairs amended the 1989 Act and 1996 Rules to allow for the creation of a new form of governance in Jammu and Kashmir, District Development Councils, to which members would be elected.
