= Ghulam Mohammad Shah =

Indian politician

5th Chief Minister of Jammu and Kashmir(state)
- In office 2 July 1984 – 6 March 1986
- Preceded by: Farooq Abdullah
- Succeeded by: Governor's Rule

President and founder of Jammu and Kashmir Awami National Conference
- Succeeded by: Begum Khalida Shah

Personal details
- Party: Jammu and Kashmir Awami National Conference
- Spouse: Begum Khalida Shah daughter of Sheikh Abdullah
- Relations: Farooq Abdullah brother-in-law, Muzaffar Shah (son)
- Education: Punjab University; Aligarh Muslim University; London School of Economics

Ghulam Mohammad Shah or G. M. Shah or Gul Shah (20 July 1920 – 6 January 2009) was an Indian politician who was Chief Minister of the state of Jammu and Kashmir from 2 July 1984 to 6 March 1986. He succeeded his brother-in-law Farooq Abdullah. Shah's father-in-law was Sheikh Mohammad Abdullah, the founder of the Jammu and Kashmir National Conference, of which Shah was once a senior member. Shah died on 6 January 2009 at the Sher-e-Kashmir Institute of Medical Sciences in Srinagar. He was 88.

== Early life ==
Ghulam Mohammad Shah was born in Srinagar (Kashmir) on 20 July 1920. He completed his bachelor's degree from Punjab University. Later, he pursued a degree in Law from Aligarh Muslim University. He also got Fellowship from London School of Economics in the field of Agriculture Economics under the United Nations Fellowship Programme. He joined National Conference in 1944. Right at the inception of his political career, he was detained several times in his struggle for people's rights. Shah was also the eldest son-in-law of former Chief Minister of the State, Sheikh Muhammad Abdullah, brother-in-law of Dr Farooq Abdullah and uncle of the former Chief Minister, Omar Abdullah.

== Career ==
After the formation of popular Government in 1947, Shah was appointed as Controller of Supplies and Prices, a post he held till 1953. After extended incarceration of nearly eight years and following the 1975 Indira-Abdullah Accord, Shah was inducted as a Minister of State in the Government. Shah is also known for masterminding the National Conference campaign in the 1977 elections, which the party won. He was later sworn in as a cabinet minister and held portfolios of Transport, Food & Supplies, Trade Agencies, Estate Works, and Power.

Shah became Chief Minister by toppling the government of his brother-in-law Farooq Abdullah in 1984. He defected from National Conference along with 12 party MLAs on 2 July 1984 bringing down the government of Farooq Abdullah, a move that created a bitter rift between the two families. Shah joined hands with the 26-member Indian National Congress legislature party and became Chief Minister. However, his government was dismissed on 12 March 1986, by the then Governor Jagmohan following the communal 1986 Anantnag Riots in south Kashmir caused by his provocative statements and announcements.

Shah had formed a new party, Awami National Conference which also participated in the Jammu and Kashmir Legislative Assembly Elections 2008.

He is survived by his wife, Begum Khalida Shah, two sons Muzaffar Ahmad Shah and a daughter.

== Controversies ==
In early 1986, Gul Shah announced the construction of a masjid inside the location of an ancient Hindu Temple in the Jammu Civil Secretariat. This move sparked widespread criticism and protests in Jammu. In February, Gul Shah then went to Kashmir and provocatively said, "Islam khatre mein hain" (Translation: "Islam is in danger"). Subsequently, Muslim rioters attacked Hindu-owned businesses and places of worship. The resulting death toll was 2000 people, consisting primarily of Hindus.

Political offices
Preceded by Farooq Abdullah	Chief Minister of Jammu and Kashmir; 1984 - 1986	Succeeded by President's Rule
