= Shaheen Public Sec. School Handwara =

Shaheen Public Secondary School Handwara

Location
- Umerabad, Khunabal; Handwara, Jammu & Kashmir, 193221; India; 34.3996°N 74.2817°E

Information
- Other names: SPSS Handwara
- School type: Private
- Motto: Ad-Adthera Tendons (Fly Higher & Higher)
- Established: 2002
- Founder: Pirzada Shabir Ahmad
- Status: Secondary
- Sister school: Wular Valley College Of Education, Bandipora
- School board: Jammu and Kashmir State Board of School Education
- School district: Kupwara
- Specialist: Mohammad Kaamil Pirzada
- School code: 01011004402
- Chairman: Pirzada Shabir Ahmad
- Principal: Shabnum Kounsar
- Teaching staff: 40+
- Employees: 60+
- Enrollment: 500+
- Classes: Nur-10th
- Education system: Co-education
- Language: English
- Hours in school day: 6
- Classrooms: 30+
- Campus type: Urban
- Sports: Cricket, football, volleyball, badminton, Kho Kho, etc.
- Newspaper: Kashmir Rays
- Website: www.spsshandwara.org

Shaheen Public Secondary School Handwara, commonly known as SPSS Handwara, is an academic and professional Private School in the Handwara, a town in the Kupwara district of the Kashmir Valley in Jammu and Kashmir, India. It is one of the oldest institutions of secondary education in Handwara. It has been upgraded to Secondary Level in 2008. It was established in 2002 and is recognised by J&K Board Of School Education.

== History ==
The school was founded on 13 March 2002 by Pirzada Shabir Ahmad. It is a private secondary school. It is recognised by J&K Board Of School Education vide renewed registration order no. 131- Aff of 2018 dated 15-10-2018. It has been upgraded to Secondary Level in 2008. It is located in Handwara, Kupwar, Jammu and Kashmir.

== Notable alumni ==
- Mohammad Kaamil Pirzada - Managing director, marketing & SEO
