= Government Degree College, Handwara =

College in Kupwara, J&K

- GDC Handwara Logo
- Motto in English: Knowledge is Power
- Type: Degree college
- Established: 1988 (38 years ago)
- Academic affiliations: University of Kashmir
- Principal: Prof. Dilruba Hamdhani
- Location: Handwara, Jammu and Kashmir, India; 34.408°N 74.288°E
- Campus: Urban
- Language: English and Urdu
- Website: www.gdchandwara.edu.in

The Government Degree College Handwara also known as GDC Handwara is University Grants Commission co-educational autonomous degree college, in Handwara town, Kupwara district, in the Indian union territory of Jammu and Kashmir. It is located about 1 km (0.62 mi) from Handwara town. It is affiliated to University of Kashmir, and is recognised by UGC under 2(f) and 12(b) of UGC Act 1956.

== Location ==
Government Degree College Handwara is located on Baramulla-Rafiabad-Kupwara National Highway NH-701 near Braripora at a distance of 1 km (0.62 mi) from Handwara town about 77 km (48 mi) from the summer capital of Jammu and Kashmir, Srinagar and 18 km (11 mi) from district headquarter Kupwara. The campus of the college is spread over an area of 100 Kanals (12.5 acre) of land.

== Establishment ==
Government of Jammu and Kashmir established the college under the Chief-Ministership of Dr. Farooq Abdullah in the year 1988. It was founded with a view to promote the need of education and to help the economically and socially under privileged students of this rural backward area to achieve the higher education.

== Courses offered ==
GDC Handwara offers bachelors courses in Arts, Science, Commerce and Computer subjects. College offers 34 combinations of 21 subjects. Geography & English literature as subjects are also available only in this college of Kupwara District.

=== Bachelors Courses ===
- Bachelor of Arts
- Bachelor of Science (Medical)
- Bachelor of Business Administration
- Bachelor of Science (Non-Medical)
- Bachelor of Commerce
- Bachelor of Computer Applications
