= National Conference Students' Union =

- Abbreviation: NCSU
- Formation: 21 July 2012; 14 years ago
- Type: Student wing
- Legal status: Active
- Purpose: To empower the student community to create responsible citizens and leaders based on the values of democracy, secularism, liberty, quality & equality.
- Headquarters: Nawa-i-Subh Comiplex Zero Bridge Srinagar, Jammu & Kashmir
- Members: Over 5 thousand
- Parent organization: Jammu & Kashmir National Conference

The National Conference Students' Union (NCSU) is the student wing of the Jammu & Kashmir National Conference party, established on 21 July 2012. The organisation was founded by Omar Abdullah working president of the National Conference.

== See also ==
- Jammu & Kashmir National Conference
- Jammu & Kashmir Youth National Conference
- Lists of political parties
