= Mukhtar Ahmad Bandh =

Kashmiri politician

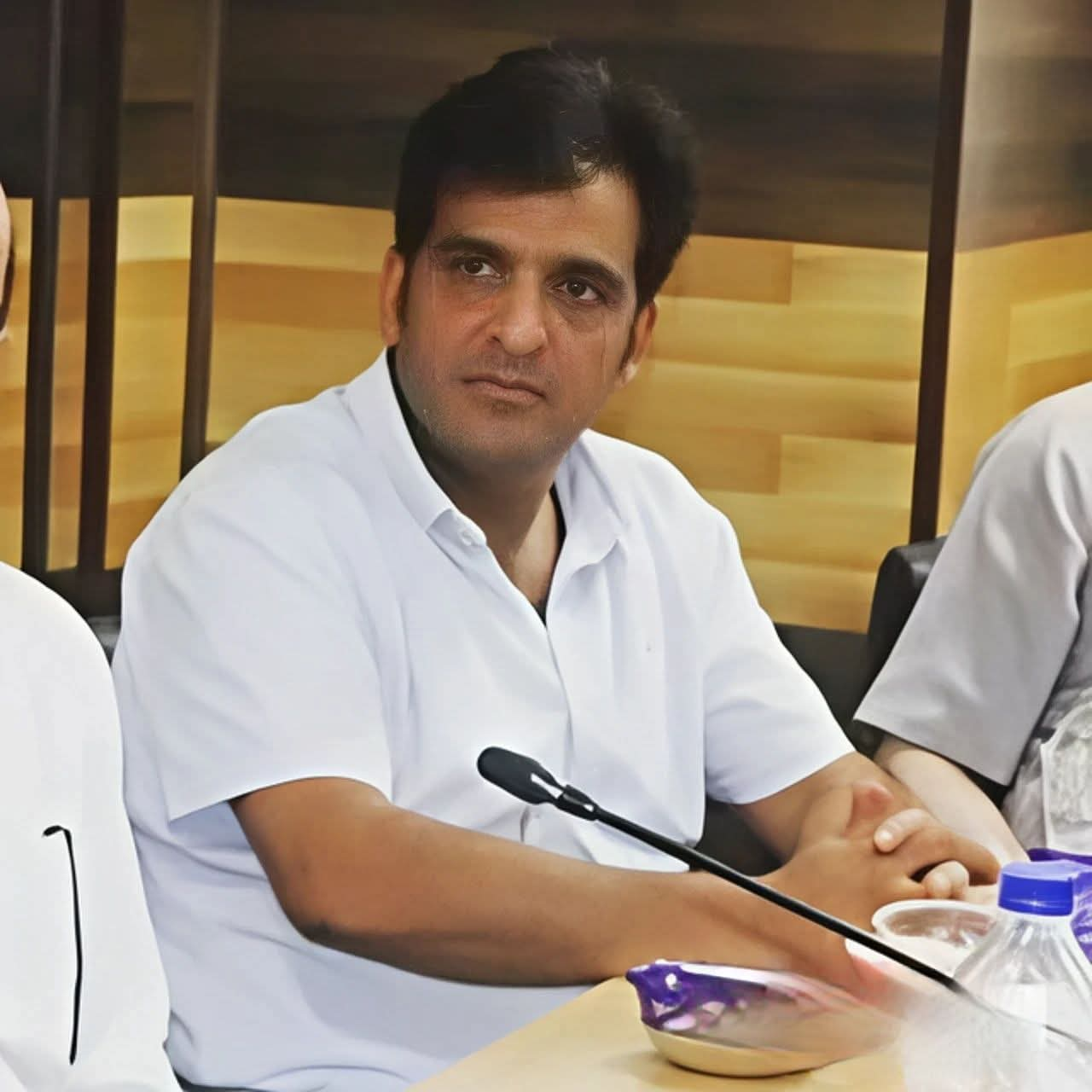

Vice-Chairperson of District Development Council, Pulwama
- Incumbent
- Assumed office 10 February 2021

Personal details
- Born: Banderpora, Pulwama, Jammu and Kashmir, India
- Party: Jammu and Kashmir National Conference
- Parent: Mohammad Khalil Bandh

Mukhtar Ahmad Bandh is an Indian politician who serves as the Vice-Chairperson of the Pulwama District Development Council (DDC) in Jammu and Kashmir. He is affiliated with the Jammu and Kashmir National Conference (JKNC), and was elected from the Litter constituency in the Pulwama DDC in December 2020 with the People's Alliance for Gupkar Declaration (PAGD) coalition.

== Early life and family ==
Mukhtar Ahmad Bandh hails from Banderpora village of Pulwama district in the Kashmir Valley. He is the son of Mohammad Khalil Bandh, a senior politician and former minister in Jammu and Kashmir government.

== Political career ==
In 2019 Bandh was detained in the state-wide protests in Jammu and Kashmir after the abrogation of Article 370 by the Indian parliament. He was elected from the Litter constituency in the Pulwama District Development Council (PDDC) in 2020 on the JKNC party ticket, and subsequently won its vice-chairperson post.

=== Detention and release post Article 370 abrogation ===
Bandh had previously joined the People's Democratic Party (PDP) like his father, Mohammad Khalil Bandh who one of its founding members. Khalil joined the Jammu and Kashmir National Conference (JKNC) party in July 2019 citing humiliation from the party leadership.

After the abrogation of Article 370 for Jammu and Kashmir by the Indian parliament on 5 August 2019, Mukhtar Ahmad Bandh was detained by the Jammu and Kashmir administration and lodged at the Sher-i-Kashmir International Conference Centre (SKICC) in Srinagar, along with several other mainstream political leaders. On 13 February 2020, he was released as part of the phased release of detainees. Other released leaders included Altaf Kaloo, Showkat Ganaie, Salman Sagar, and Nizam Uddin Bhat.

=== Pulwama District Development Council ===
After the abrogation, the three-tier panchayati raj system was implemented in the union territory of Jammu and Kashmir. The first District Development Council elections were held in eight phases in the winter of 2020. The JKNC fielded Bandh as its candidate for the Litter constituency in the Pulwama DDC. In December 2020 he won the seat defeating the nearest rival, Mushtaq Ahmad Yatoo of Apni Party by 894 votes. He took the oath for the office on 28 December 2020.

On 10 February 2021, as part of People's Alliance for Gupkar Declaration, Bandh won the post of vice-chairperson of the Pulwama DDC with nine votes over Minha Lateef on the Bharatiya Janata Party who secured four votes. His alliance partner from People's Democratic Party was elected the chairperson.

=== Public service and development work ===
Bandh continues to work for implementation of rural development schemes and infrastructure improvements in the district. He has actively participated in addressing rural governance issues. In 2023, he raised concerns about solid waste mismanagement in rural Pulwama and emphasised the need for systemic improvement.

In June 2025, following the breach of the Awantipora canal, he visited the affected area, oversaw the response measures, and assured residents that restoration would be completed by the weekend.
