= Sajjad Gani Lone =

Indian politician and Chairman of Jammu and Kashmir People's Conference

Sajad Gani Lone
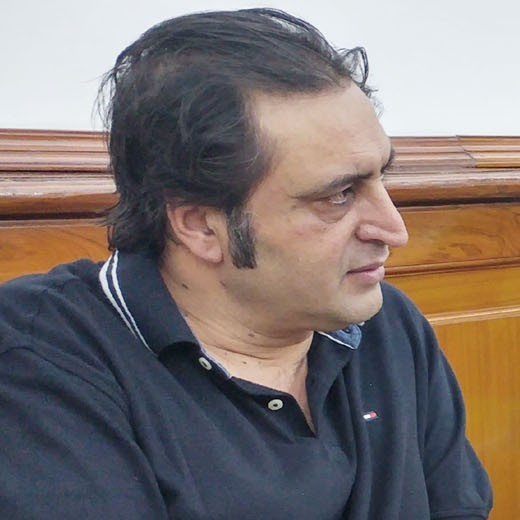
- Sajad Gani Lone

Spokesperson of People's Alliance for Gupkar Declaration
- In office 24 October 2020 – 19 January 2021
- Preceded by: position established
- Succeeded by: Mohammed Yousuf Tarigami

Member in J&K Legislative Assembly
- Incumbent
- Assumed office 8 October 2024
- Preceded by: Chowdary Mohmad Ramzan
- Constituency: Handwara

Minister for Social Welfare, ARI & Trainings and Science & Technology, Government of J&K
- In office April 2016 – 19 June 2018
- Preceded by: Sakina Itoo
- Succeeded by: Governor's rule

Minister for Animal, Sheep Husbandry, Fisheries and Science & Technology, Government of J&K
- In office 1 March 2015 – 7 January 2016

Personal details
- Born: 9 December 1966 (age 59) Handwara, Jammu and Kashmir, India
- Party: Jammu and Kashmir People's Conference
- Other political affiliations: National Democratic Alliance (2014–2019)
- Spouse: Asma Khan Lone (m. 2000)
- Children: Amad Gani Lone (son) Adnan Gani Lone (son)
- Parent: Abdul Gani Lone (father)
- Relatives: Shabnam Gani Lone (sister); Bilal Gani Lone (brother)
- Education: Bachelor of Commerce

Sajad Gani Lone (born 9 December 1966) is an Indian politician, and Member of the Legislative Assembly elected from the Handwara constituency. He is the chairman of Jammu and Kashmir People's Conference. He was also a Cabinet Minister of the Social Welfare department of the Government of Jammu and Kashmir during the People's Democratic Party - BJP Alliance Government (2014 - 2018).

== Early and personal life ==
Sajjad Lone was born on 9 December 1966. Sajjad Gani Lone is the younger of the two sons of Abdul Ghani Lone, a former separatist, who was assassinated in a rally in Srinagar in 2002. His elder brother, Bilal Gani Lone, is a member of moderate faction of Hurriyat, also a member of Hurriyat Conference's Executive Council. His sister, Shabnam Gani Lone, is a lawyer by profession and an independent politician from Kupwara, J&K.

Sajjad attended Burn Hall School in Srinagar and graduated from the University of Wales, College of Cardiff, UK in 1989.

Sajjad Lone is married to Asma Khan, daughter of JKLF ideologue Amanullah Khan, the Pakistan-based leader of the Jammu and Kashmir Liberation Front. The couple have two sons.

== Political career ==
Lone remained associated with the Hurriyat for a while in early 2000's but in 2004, after the assassination of his father, Lone became the chairman of People's Conference.

Before he stood as an independent candidate in the 2009 Indian general election from the Baramulla Lok Sabha constituency, he in 2008, at the height of the Amarnath land transfer controversy, believed that the protests were a mass uprising against Indian rule and decided to boycott the Assembly elections. He was defeated by the National Conference candidate Sharifuddin Shariq.

In 2014 Jammu and Kashmir Legislative Assembly election, Lone won Handwara assembly constituency in north Kashmir, by a margin of more than 5000 votes. He was one of the two People's Conference candidates elected to the state legislative assembly. His party JKPC led in all blocks of Handwara constituency including Rajwar, Ramhal and Magam.

In 2018, days after BJP withdrew its support to the PDP-BJP coalition government in Jammu and Kashmir, Lone staked claim to form the government in the erstwhile state as he possessed the required support of BJP and some other lawmakers. However, the then Governor Satya Pal Malik dissolved the state assembly without letting Lone prove his claim.

=== Opposition to the revocation of special status ===
Sajad Gani Lone has been vocal supporter of special status of Jammu & Kashmir. He was part of an-all party group formed for safeguarding Jammu and Kashmir's special status. Hours before BJP-led centre revoked the special status of Jammu and Kashmir by reading down the Article 370, Lone was put under house arrest. On 5 August, Lone was arrested by Jammu & Kashmir police and lodged in a jail in Srinagar. He was taken into police custody on 5 August 2019 and was freed from detention on 31 July 2020. In 2024 Jammu and Kashmir Legislative Assembly election, Lone won Handwara assembly constituency in north Kashmir, by a margin of more than 650 votes.

== Recognition ==
- Sajjad Lone featured in list of top 6 Indians of 2015 by Khaleej Times, UAE.
