= Restoration of the statehood of Jammu and Kashmir and Ladakh =

Following the revocation of the special status of Jammu and Kashmir, the former state of Jammu and Kashmir was bifurcated into the union territory of Jammu and Kashmir and the union territory of Ladakh. Following the bifurcation, calls in Jammu and Kashmir began for the restoration of its statehood, while Ladakh also saw similar demands in the following months.

On 11 December 2023, the Supreme Court of India unanimously upheld the abrogation of Articles 370 and 35A, while also directing the union government to restore the statehood of Jammu and Kashmir, and hold legislative assembly elections no later than September 2024.
