= Noor Mohammad Shah =

Kashmiri Sufi musician, songwriter (born 1954)

- Born: 1954 (age 71–72); Handwara, Jammu and Kashmir, India
- Genres: Sufi music
- Occupations: Musician; songwriter
- Instrument: Rabab
- Years active: 1970–present
- Label: Zee Music Company Renzu Music Coke Studio Bharat

Noor Mohammad Shah (Kashmiri: نوٗر مُحمد شاہ, born 1954) is a Kashmiri traditional Sufi music performer and songwriter, from Baki-Aker village in Handwara town, in the Kupwara district of North Kashmir.

== Background ==
Shah is a traditional Sufi music performer and songwriter and a virtuoso of the rabab. When a boy, in 1970, he was noticed for his talent with the idiophone-style Kashmiri percussion instrument of nout (clay pot) by the local singer Mohammad Yousuf Shah who then invited him to his troupe for training and work. Having become a musician in his own right, for three decades Shah played and sang for the Sufi saint Ahad Sahib of Sopore (1980–2010), beginning at the turn of the 1980s.

== Career ==
In 2016, the posh Rawalpora (Colony) section of Srinagar, the summer capital of the Indian state of Jammu and Kashmir, a group of young men for whom he performed filmed Shah on a mobile phone and uploaded the video to the internet. The song which Noor Mohammad sang was "Kato chukh nudibaney walo mashiko myani" was filmed by Shah Jahan Tantray of Rawalpora. The musician sang for them a famous elegy by a 16th-century Muslim poet and ascetic Habba Khatoon (who was also Empress Consort of the last Emperor of Kashmir). Without the humble and God-fearing musician's knowledge, this video went viral on the web and unexpectedly made him into a celebrity. Previously, he performed in mehfils (Dervish gatherings) and for weddings, while at present his songs are listened to online around the world. In 2018 the Kashmiri and Urdu-language poet and musician Mohammad Muneer Nazir and his band Alif, invited Shah to produce a Kashmiri-language single 'Ride Home'. It proved a great success, watched online by over 3 million viewers. His song with Danish's Renzu's label Renzu Music Hoshdar won hearts and has become the anthem for Kashmiri youth. His biggest hit Janaan which hit organic 4 million views released on Zee music and was also produced by Danish Renzu
