= Gandhi Memorial College, Srinagar =

College in Jammu and Kashmir, India

Gandhi Memorial College
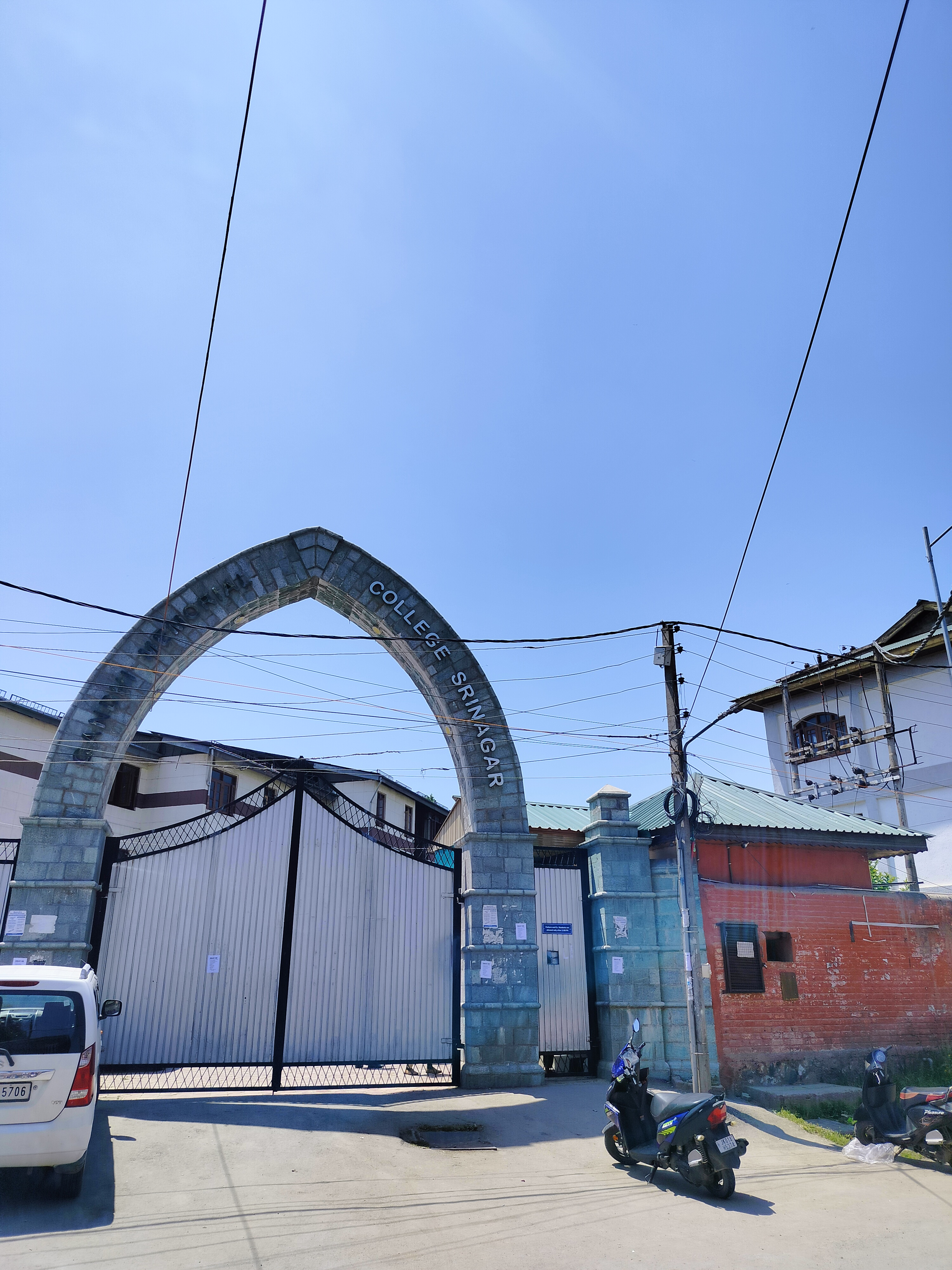
- Main gate of Gandhi Memorial College
- Type: Degree College
- Established: 1942
- Academic affiliation: University of Kashmir
- Vice-Chancellor: Khurshid Iqbal Andrabi
- Location: Fateh Kadal, Srinagar, Jammu and Kashmir, India
- Campus: Urban
- Language: English, Urdu, Hindi
- Website: https://gandhicollegesrinagar.edu.in/Main/Default.aspx

The Gandhi Memorial College Srinagar, is a co-educational college located on 1.75 (14 kanal) acre campus in Shamswari, Fateh Kadal, Srinagar in the Indian union territory of Jammu and Kashmir. The college was established in the year 1942. It is a grant-in-aid college and is run by Hindu Education Society of Kashmir. The college gets grant-in-aid from Govt. of Jammu and Kashmir. It is affiliated with the University of Kashmir.

== Location ==
Gandhi Memorial College is located in Shamswari, Fateh Kadal locality of Srinagar. It is situated near the Baba demb lake near Mangleshwar Temple. The college is about two kilometres (1.2 mi) from Srinagar city centre Lal Chowk.

== Establishment ==
The college was established by eminent philanthropic personalities of Kashmiri Pandit Community, Hindu Society of Kashmir in 1943, during the regime of Maharaja Hari Singh, to cater to the educational needs of the society.

== Degrees offered ==
- Bachelor of Arts
- Bachelor of Science
- Bachelor of Commerce
- Bachelor of Business Administration

== Awards and achievements ==
Gandhi Memorial College has won sixth Inter College Prof. Yousuf Memorial Cricket Championship, Inter College Football Championship (boys), Inter College Judo Championship (boys) .

== See also ==
- Islamia College of Science and Commerce, Srinagar
