= Kralpora =

Kralpora Kralpur Kral Pora
- Town
- Location in Jammu and Kashmir, India Kralpora (India)
- Coordinates: 34.50°N 74.10°E
- Country: India
- Union Territory: Jammu and Kashmir
- District: Kupwara

Population (2011)
  - Total: 6,518

Languages
  - Official: Kashmiri, Urdu, Hindi, Dogri, English
- Time zone: UTC+5:30 (IST)
- PIN: 193224

Kralpora or Kralpur is a Tehsil and a village in Kupwara district of the Indian administered union territory of Jammu and Kashmir. The village is located just 15 kilometres from district headquarters Kupwara town.

== Demographics ==
According to the 2011 census of India, Kralpora has 569 households. The literacy rate of Kralpora was 66.45% compared to 67.16% of Jammu and Kashmir. In Kralpora, Male literacy stands at 73.92% while the female literacy rate was 57.96%.

== Transport ==
=== Road ===
Kralpora is well-connected by road with other places in Jammu and Kashmir and India by the Kupwara-Kralpora Road and Kupwara-Trehgam Road.

=== Rail ===
The nearest railway stations to Kralpora are Sopore railway station and Baramulla railway station located at a distance of 56 and 53 kilometres respectively.

=== Air ===
The nearest airport is Srinagar International Airport located at a distance of 108 kilometres and is a 3-hour drive.

== See also ==
- Kupwara
- Gogjigund
- Jammu and Kashmir
- Lolab Valley
- Watter Khani
- Drugmulla
