= Jammu & Kashmir People's Movement =

Jammu and Kashmir People's Movement
- Abbreviation: JKPM
- President: Mohammad Hussain Padder
- Founded: 17 March 2019
- Colours: Green
- Alliance: People's Alliance for Gupkar Declaration (2020–2022)
- Seats in District Development Council: 3 / 280
- Seats in Jammu and Kashmir Legislative Assembly: 0 / 90

The Jammu and Kashmir People's Movement (JKPM) is a political party in Jammu and Kashmir, India.

On July 24, 2024 Mohammad Hussain Padder was chosen as President of the party.

== History ==
The party was founded in 2019 by Indian Administrative Service officer Shah Faesal. As of August 2020, the party is currently headed by Mustafa Khan after the resignation of Javed Mustafa Mir.

JKPM was the leading petitioner in supreme court of India regarding the abrogation of article 370. Its members M. Hussain and Rohit Sharma are the petitioners in the supreme court of India.

After the revocation of Article 370, Faesal was detained and placed under house arrest with other leaders of Kashmir. After his release, Faesal decided to step down as president.

The party joined the People's Alliance for Gupkar Declaration in October 2020 and left in June 2022.

On 14 July 2022, some media sources stated that the Jammu and Kashmir People's Movement had merged into the Aam Aadmi Party. These claims were disputed by party vice-president Syed Iqbal Tahir, who claimed that no merger had taken place, and that such a merger would need approval from 2/3 of the party membership. However, he did confirm that some members of the some party executive, including president Dr. Mustafa Khan, had defected to the AAP.

== Platform ==
The Jammu and Kashmir People's Movement invites Young and energetic youth to provide an alternative political platform for the people of all the regions of Jammu and Kashmir for electoral alliance to keep dynasty rulers away from power as they betrayed people of Jammu and Kashmir since 1947 for their personal and vested interests.
