= Jammu and Kashmir Awami National Conference =

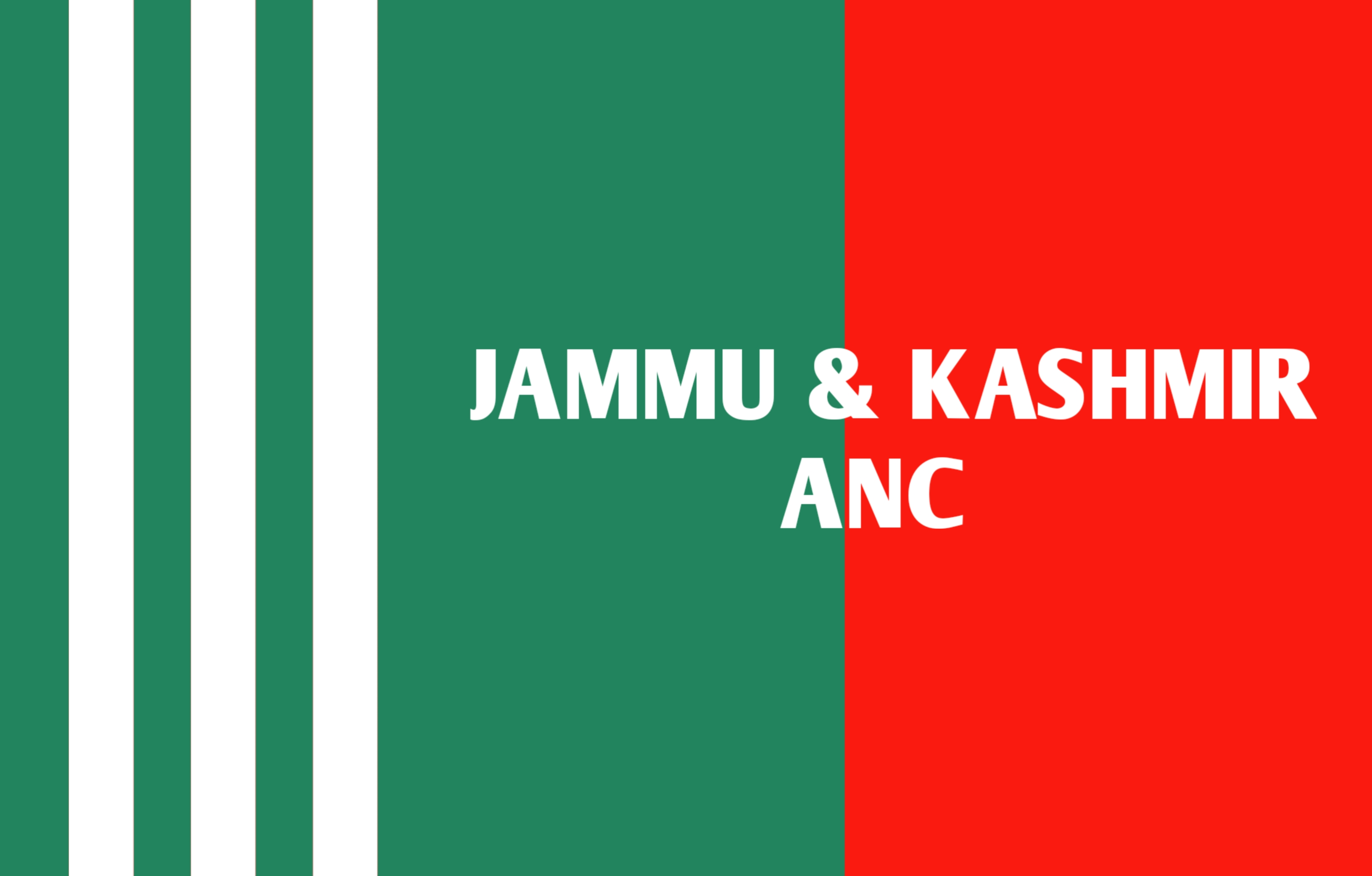
- Abbreviation: JKANC
- Chairman: Khalida begum (President); Muzaffar Ahmad Shah (Vice President)
- Founder: Ghulam Mohammad Shah
- Founded: 1984 (42 years ago) (as National Conference (Khalida))
- Split from: Jammu & Kashmir National Conference
- Alliance: People's Alliance for Gupkar Declaration (2020–2024)
- Seats in Jammu and Kashmir Legislative Assembly: 0 / 90
- Seats in District Development Council: 0 / 280

The Jammu and Kashmir Awami National Conference was founded by former chief minister of Jammu and Kashmir Ghulam Mohammad Shah after his split with the Jammu and Kashmir National Conference. It is currently headed by his wife Khalida Begum, with his son as vice president. It was part of the Gupkar Alliance. Candidates from the group ran in District Development Council elections. The party was founded in the year 1984, as "National Conference (Khalida)". It is a break-away faction of the Jammu and Kashmir National Conference (JKNC), which allied itself with Indian National Congress to form a government under the leadership of Ghulam Mohammad Shah as the chief minister.
