= Jammu and Kashmir People's Conference =

- Abbreviation: JKPC
- President: Sajjad Gani Lone
- Chairman: Abdul Gani Vakil
- Secretary: Imran Raza Ansari
- Founder: Abdul Ghani Lone, Iftikhar Hussain Ansari
- Founded: 1978
- Headquarters: VIP-4, Church Lane - Sonwar, Srinagar
- Youth wing: Youth JKPC
- Women's wing: JKPC Women's Wing
- ECI status: Unrecongnized
- Alliance: NDA (2016–2018); PAGD (2020–2021)
- Seats in Rajya Sabha: 0 / 245
- Seats in Lok Sabha: 0 / 543
- Seats in Jammu and Kashmir Legislative Assembly: 1 / 90
- Seats in District Development Council: 8 / 280

Election symbol
- Apple

Website
- https://www.jkpcofficial.org/

The Jammu and Kashmir People's Conference is a political party in Jammu and Kashmir, India, founded by Abdul Ghani Lone and Molvi Iftikhar Hussain Ansari in 1978. It is currently led by Sajjad Lone. It won two seats in the 2014 Jammu and Kashmir Legislative Assembly election and one seat in the Jammu and Kashmir Legislative Assembly in the 2024 elections.

== History ==
Abdul Ghani Lone founded the People's Conference in 1977 and it was the only separatist organization registered with the Election Commission of India till 1996.

In 1993, Lone joined the secessionist Hurriyat Conference. His ideology about Kashmir was to make it an 'Independent Kashmir' after being anti-India as well as anti-Pakistan.

Lone is the son of Abdul Gani Lone, the former Congress leader who turned into a frontline separatist leader. The older Lone was allegedly killed in Srinagar by ISI-backed militants on 21 May 2002.

Once a seasoned mainstream politician, who was first elected to the J&K Assembly as a Congress MLA in 1967, Abdul Gani Lone was arrested for alleged anti-India activities in 1990. He was also a founder-member of the separatist conglomerate the All Party Hurriyat Conference (APHC). He also opposed foreign militants in the valley.

After his father was gunned down, Sajjad Gani Lone remained with the Hurriyat for a while but in 2004, he revived the People's Conference party that the older Lone had launched in 1978. He also parted ways with his elder brother Bilal Lone, who continues to be part of the Hurriyat Conference and in response Bilal disassociated himself from party and he launched his own party called Jammu and Kashmir Peoples Independent Movement as a splinter separatist faction of People's Conference.

== Political career ==
In 2006, Lone put forward a controversial plan, titled Achievable Nationhood, to unify the divided territory of Kashmir and give it autonomy. The 268-page "vision document" attempted to achieve an economically single boundary-less Jammu and Kashmir Economic Union with India and Pakistan jointly managing defence and foreign affairs of their respective portions of Kashmir.

In 2008, at the height of the Amarnath Shrine Board land row, Lone believed that the protests were a mass uprising against Indian rule and decided to boycott the Assembly elections.

By the 2009 general elections, he became the first frontline separatist leader to plunge into mainstream politics. Contesting as an Independent from the Baramulla Lok Sabha constituency, he lost to National Conference’s Sharifuddin Shariq.

After the 2014 general elections, Lone had a meeting with Prime Minister Narendra Modi, where he referred to the PM as his elder brother.

"I came as a Kashmiri to meet the Prime Minister and I was pleasantly surprised with his down-to-earth personality, his vision about bringing in investments into the state," PTI quoted him as having said then.

The purpose of the meeting soon became clear that the People's Conference fielded candidates in the 2014 J&K Assembly elections, winning two seats, including Lone himself. He was made a minister from the BJP quota in the Mufti Mohammad Sayeed-led PDP-BJP government, a job he was given again when Mufti's daughter Mehbooba became chief minister a few months after his death. In 2024 elections, the party won 1 seat with Lone winning from Handwara.

== See also ==
- Politics of Jammu and Kashmir
- Jammu and Kashmir Peoples Democratic Party
- Jammu Kashmir Liberation Front
