= Jammu & Kashmir National Conference =

Political party in Jammu and Kashmir

Jammu and Kashmir National Conference
- Abbreviation: JKNC (National)
- President: Farooq Abdullah
- Chairperson: Omar Abdullah
- Rajya Sabha Leader: Chowdry Mohammad Ramzan
- Lok Sabha Leader: Aga Syed Ruhullah Mehdi
- Founder: Sheikh Abdullah & Chaudhry Ghulam Abbas
- Founded: 15 October 1932 (94 years ago)
- Headquarters: Nawa-e-sueb, Srinagar, Jammu and Kashmir
- Student wing: National Conference Students' Union
- Youth wing: Youth National Conference
- Ideology: Kashmiriyat; Jammu and Kashmir statehood Social democracy Regionalism; Civic nationalism
- Political position: Centre-left
- ECI status: State Party
- Alliance: National Alliance INDIA (since 2023); Former Alliances: UPA (2008–2015, 2019–2023) (till dissolved)) (National); People's Alliance for Gupkar Declaration (2019–2024) (State Level); National Democratic Alliance (1998–2002) (India)
- Seats in Rajya Sabha: 3 / 245
- Seats in Lok Sabha: 1 / 543
- Seats in Jammu and Kashmir Legislative Assembly: 41 / 90
- Seats in District Development Council: 67 / 280
- Number of states and union territories in government: 1 / 31

Election symbol
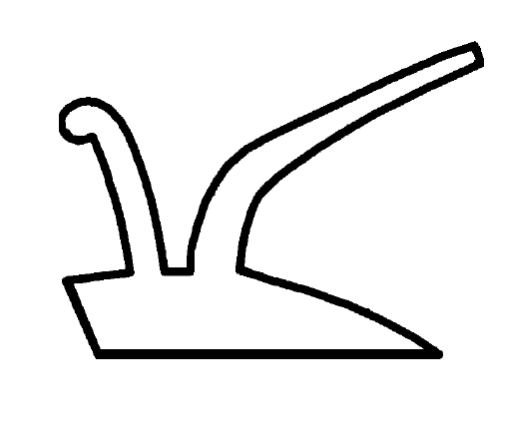
- Plough

Website
- www.jknc.co.in

The Jammu and Kashmir National Conference (JKNC) is a regional political party in Indian-administered Jammu and Kashmir union territory and Ladakh. Founded as the All Jammu and Kashmir Muslim Conference by Sheikh Abdullah and Chaudhry Ghulam Abbas in 1932 in the princely state of Jammu and Kashmir, the organisation renamed itself to National Conference in 1939 in order to represent all the people of the state. It supported the accession of the princely state to India in 1947. Prior to that, in 1941, a group led by Ghulam Abbas broke off from the National Conference and revived the old Muslim Conference. The revived Muslim Conference supported the accession of the princely state to Pakistan and led the movement for Azad Kashmir.

Since 1947, the National Conference was in power in Jammu and Kashmir in one form or another till 2002, and again between 2009 and 2015. It implemented land reforms in the state, ensured the state's autonomy under Article 370 of the Indian Constitution, and formulated a separate Constitution of Jammu and Kashmir in 1957. Sheikh Abdullah's son Farooq Abdullah (1981–2002, 2009–present) and grandson Omar Abdullah (2002–2009) have led the party after Sheikh Abdullah's death as the president. The party was a member of the People's Alliance for Gupkar Declaration electoral alliance.

== History ==
=== The pre-independence period ===
On 15 October 1932, Sheikh Abdullah founded the All Jammu and Kashmir Muslim Conference in collaboration with Mirwaiz Yusuf Shah and Chaudhry Ghulam Abbas. On 11 June 1939 it was renamed as the All Jammu and Kashmir National Conference. This prompted a section of the leadership to break away and re-establish the Muslim Conference, with links to the All-India Muslim League. The National Conference was affiliated to the All India States Peoples Conference. Sheikh Abdullah was elected its president in 1947. In 1946, the National Conference launched an intensive agitation against the state government. It was directed against the Maharaja of Jammu and Kashmir, Hari Singh. The slogan of the agitation was "Quit Kashmir".

=== The post-independence period ===
In the elections held in September 1951, National Conference won all 75 seats of the Constituent assembly of Jammu and Kashmir. Sheikh Abdullah remained prime minister until his dismissal in August 1953 on the grounds of conspiracy against the state of India. Bakshi Ghulam Mohammad became prime minister of the state, and Sheikh Abdullah was arrested on 9 August 1953.

In 1965, the National Conference merged with the Indian National Congress (INC) and became the Jammu and Kashmir branch of the Indian National Congress. Sheikh Abdullah was again arrested in 1965 until 1968 for conspiracy against the state. Sheikh Abdullah's splinter Plebiscite Front faction later appropriated the name of the original party when Abdullah was allowed to return to power in February 1975 after striking a deal with the central government. In 1977, the National Conference he led won the state assembly elections, and Sheikh Abdullah became chief minister. His son Farooq Abdullah succeeded him as the chief minister on his death on 8 September 1982. In June 1983 elections, the JKNC, led by Farooq Abdullah, again won a comfortable majority.

In July 1984, Farooq's brother-in-law Ghulam Mohammad Shah split the party. Acting on the behest of the central government, the governor dismissed Farooq as chief minister and replaced him with Ghulam Mohammad Shah. His government was dismissed in March 1986 and presidential rule was imposed. In the contested state assembly elections of 1987, the JKNC formed an alliance with the INC, and was declared to have won a majority. Farooq Abdullah again became chief minister and on Abdullah's watch an insurgency against the state government and India began. Abdullah was dismissed again in 1990 by the union government and presidential rule was imposed in the state. In 1991, the state elections were cancelled due to a revolt by the people.

=== 1996 onwards ===
In the Jammu and Kashmir state assembly elections in 1996, the JKNC led by Abdullah was awarded the election yet again winning 57 seats out of a total 87. Like its predecessors, this election has been deemed to be rigged and Abdullah stepped down in 2000. His son, Omar Abdullah then took up the reins of power in the state. But in 2002 state assembly elections, the JKNC won only 28 seats, with the Jammu and Kashmir People's Democratic Party (PDP) emerging in the Kashmir Valley as a contender for power. In the December 2008 state assembly elections, no single party was able to get the majority. The JKNC led by Farooq's son Omar Abdullah emerged as a single largest party, winning 28 seats. After the elections, on 30 December 2008 the JKNC formed an alliance with the INC which had won 17 seats. Omar Abdullah became the chief minister of this coalition government on 5 January 2009.

JKNC and INC contested 2009 general election in alliance. INC won all the two seats of Jammu region but lost Ladakh seat to NC rebel who contested as an independent candidate. NC won all the three seats of the Kashmir Valley in 2009.

During this period, the JKNC has experienced increasing controversies over the Accession of Kashmir to India. Protests against the government in 2010 when approximately 100 protesters (one as young as 11) were killed as the result of live ammunition being fired by state paramilitary forces. A torture scandal was exposed by the WikiLeaks, revelations which were subsequently aired on Channel 4.

In the 2014 general election, the NC contested the election in an alliance with Indian National Congress but did not win a single seat. Out of six seats in the state, PDP and Bharatiya Janata Party (BJP) won three each.

During the 2014 Jammu and Kashmir Legislative Assembly election, INC broke its alliance with JKNC. JKNC contested all the assembly seats but won only 15 seats, a decrease of 13 seats. PDP won 28 seats and became the largest party in the assembly followed by BJP winning 25 seats. Omar Abdullah resigned as a chief minister on 24 December 2014. In 2024 Jammu and Kashmir Legislative Assembly election, J&K National Conference won 42 seats in total, while BJP came second with 29 seats won and Omar Abdullah became the chief minister of the Union Territory of Jammu and Kashmir.

== Party flag ==
The flag of Jammu and Kashmir National Conference had its origin in events on 13 July 1931 in Srinagar, when Kashmiri Muslims were protesting outside the Srinagar Central Jail premises at Srinagar where Abdul Qadeer was arrested on the charge of inciting public against the Maharaja of Jammu and Kashmir by Dogra state forces. The blood-tainted shirt of one of the victims was then hoisted by the crowd as the new flag of Kashmir. On 11 July 1939, the flag was adopted by the JKNC as its official flag.

== Article 370 and after ==
After the abrogation of Article 370 on 5 August 2019, which revoked Jammu and Kashmir's special status, the Jammu and Kashmir National Conference (JKNC) has been advocating for its restoration. In their 2024 election manifesto, the party pledged to fight for the reinstatement of Article 370 and the region's statehood. They also proposed repealing post-2019 laws that they argue adversely impact the region's autonomy. Additionally, the JKNC aims to encourage dialogue between India and Pakistan to address the Kashmir issue.

The revocation of Article 370 was part of the Bharatiya Janata Party's (BJP) efforts to fully integrate Jammu and Kashmir into India, a move that has faced significant opposition from local political parties like the JKNC. The National Conference's current leadership, including Omar Abdullah, has reiterated their determination to pursue statehood and autonomy through legal and political channels.

DDC Elections 2020 In the 2020 District Development Council (DDC) elections, the JKNC won several seats in South Kashmir, including Pulwama district, as part of the People's Alliance for Gupkar Declaration (PAGD).

JKNC candidate Mukhtar Ahmad Bandh was elected from Litter constituency and subsequently chosen as the Vice-Chairperson of the Pulwama District Development Council in February 2021.

=== 2024 Jammu and Kashmir elections ===
The 2024 Jammu and Kashmir Legislative Assembly elections were scheduled to be held in three phases: 18 September, 25 September, and 1 October 2024. This was the first election since the revocation of the special status in 2019. The election decided 90 seats in the assembly.

The results were announced on 8 October 2024. Key parties contesting include: The Bharatiya Janata Party (BJP), Jammu and Kashmir National Conference (NC), Indian National Congress (INC), and Jammu and Kashmir Peoples Democratic Party (PDP)

After Jammu and Kashmir elections

The party secured a record 42 seats, being the single largest party in the territory, and it was followed by the BJP with 29 seats. The party has also passed the 2024 Jammu and Kashmir autonomy resolution in the assembly.

== Electoral performance ==
=== Jammu and Kashmir Legislative Assembly ===
Election Year	Assembly	Seats contested	Seats won	Overall votes	(%) of votes	(±) in seats	Vote swing	Outcome
Jammu and Kashmir Legislative Assembly
1951	1st		75 / 75					Government
1957	2nd		68 / 75					Government
1962	3rd	75	70 / 75	4,86,060	66.96%			Government
1967	4th	38	8 / 75	1,37,179	17.16%	▼62	▼49.80	Government
1972	5th	0	0 / 75	Did Not Contest				
1977	6th	75	47 / 75	8,07,166	46.22%	▲39	▲29.06	Government
1983	7th	75	46 / 75	10,39,064	47.29%	▼1	▲1.07	Government
1987	8th	45	40 / 87	8,57,830	32.98%	▼6	▼14.31	Government
1996	9th	81	57 / 87	8,63,612	34.78%	▲17	▲1.80	Government
2002	10th	85	28 / 87	7,49,825	28.24%	▼29	▼6.54	Government
2008	11th	85	28 / 87	9,14,691	23.07%	Steady	▼5.17	Government
2014	12th	85	15 / 87	10,00,693	20.77%	▼13	▼2.30	Government
Union Territory of Jammu and Kashmir
2024	13th	56	42 / 90	13,36,147	23.43%	▲27	▲2.66	Government

== Prime ministers of Jammu and Kashmir ==
Prime ministers of Jammu and Kashmir
No. (Note: A parenthetical number indicates that the incumbent has previously held office.)	Name	Portrait	Constituency	Tenure						
No.	Name	Portrait	Constituency	1	Sheikh Abdullah		–	5 March 1948	31 October 1951	3 years, 240 days
31 October 1951	9 August 1953	1 year, 282 days		1	Sheikh Abdullah		–			
3	Bakshi Ghulam Mohammad		Safa Kadal	9 August 1953	25 March 1957	3 years, 228 days				
3	Bakshi Ghulam Mohammad		Safa Kadal	25 March 1957	18 February 1962	4 years, 330 days				
3	Bakshi Ghulam Mohammad		Safa Kadal	18 February 1962	12 October 1963	1 year, 297 days				
4	Khwaja Shamsuddin		Anantnag	12 October 1963	29 February 1964	140 days				

== Chief ministers of the Jammu and Kashmir ==
Chief Minister of Jammu and Kashmir
No. (Note: A parenthetical number indicates that the incumbent has previously held office.)	Name	Portrait	Constituency	Tenure		
No.	Name	Portrait	Constituency	From	To	Days in office
1	Sheikh Abdullah		MLC	25 February 1975	26 March 1977	2 years, 29 days
2	Sheikh Abdullah		Ganderbal	9 July 1977	8 September 1982	5 years, 61 days
3	Farooq Abdullah		Ganderbal	8 September 1982	24 November 1983	1 year, 77 days
3	Farooq Abdullah		Ganderbal	24 November 1983	2 July 1984	221 days
4	Farooq Abdullah		Ganderbal	7 November 1986	23 March 1987	136 days
4	Farooq Abdullah		Ganderbal	23 March 1987	19 January 1990	2 years, 302 days
5	Farooq Abdullah		Ganderbal	9 October 1996	18 October 2002	6 years, 9 days
6	Omar Abdullah		Ganderbal	5 January 2009	8 January 2015	6 years, 3 days
7	Omar Abdullah		Ganderbal	16 October 2024	Incumbent	2 years, 20 days

== Deputy prime minister and chief ministers of Jammu and Kashmir ==
Sr. No.	Photo	Name	Took office	Left office
Deputy prime minister of the Jammu and Kashmir
1		Bakshi Ghulam Mohammad	5 March 1948	9 August 1953
Deputy chief ministers state of the Jammu and Kashmir
1		Mirza Afzal Beg	25 February 1975	25 September 1978
2		Devi Das Thakur	2 July 1984	6 March 1986
3		Surinder Kumar Choudhary	16 October 2024	Incumbent

== List of union ministers ==
No.	Portrait	Minister (Birth-Death) Constituency	Term of office			Portfolio	Ministry	Prime minister
No.	Portrait	Minister (Birth-Death) Constituency	From	To	Period	Portfolio	Ministry	Prime minister
1		Omar Abdullah (born 1970); MP for Srinagar (MoS)	22 July 2001	23 December 2002	1 year, 154 days	Minister of State in Ministry of External Affairs	Vajpayee III	Atal Bihari Vajpayee
2		Farooq Abdullah (born 1937); MP for Srinagar	29 May 2009	26 May 2014	4 years, 362 days	Ministry of New and Renewable Energy	Manmohan II	Manmohan Singh

== List of current Lok Sabha members ==
#	Constituency	Name
3	Anantnag–Rajouri	Mian Altaf Ahmed Larvi

== List of current Rajya Sabha members ==
#	Name	Term start	Term end
1	Sajjad Ahmad Kichloo	25-Oct-2025	24-Oct-2031
2	Chowdhary Mohammad Ramzan	25-Oct-2025	24-Oct-2031
3	Gurvinder Singh Oberoi	25-Oct-2025	24-Oct-2031

== See also ==
- Article 370 of the Constitution of India
- Politics of Jammu and Kashmir
- Jammu and Kashmir Peoples Democratic Party
- Jammu and Kashmir Apni Party
- Jammu and Kashmir Workers Party
- Ikkjutt Jammu
- Bharatiya Janata Party
- Indian National Congress
- Jammu and Kashmir People's Conference
- Democratic Azad Party
- List of political parties in India

== Bibliography ==
- Bose, Sumantra (2003), Kashmir: Roots of Conflict, Paths to Peace, Harvard University Press, ISBN 0-674-01173-2
- Parashar, Parmanand (2004), Kashmir and the Freedom Movement, Sarup & Sons, ISBN 978-81-7625-514-1
- Rai, Mridu (2004), Hindu Rulers, Muslim Subjects: Islam, Rights, and the History of Kashmir, C. Hurst & Co, ISBN 1850656614
- Schofield, Victoria (2003) [First published in 2000], Kashmir in Conflict, London and New York: I. B. Taurus & Co, ISBN 1860648983
- Zutshi, Chitralekha (2004), Languages of Belonging: Islam, Regional Identity, and the Making of Kashmir, C. Hurst & Co. Publishers, ISBN 978-1-85065-700-2
