= List of parliamentary constituencies in Jammu and Kashmir =

Rajya sabha has 4 seats

Lok sabha has 5 seats

== Rajya Sabha ==
The Rajya Sabha (meaning the "Council of States") is the upper house of the Parliament of India. Jammu and Kashmir state elects Four members and they are indirectly elected by the state legislators of Jammu and Kashmir. The number of seats allocated to the party, are determined by the number of seats a party possesses during nomination and the party nominates a member to be voted on. Elections within the state legislatures are held using Single transferable vote with proportional representation.

=== List of members ===
Source: Parliament of India (Rajya Sabha)

Keys: JKNC (3) BJP (1)

#	Name	Party	Term start	Term end
1	Sajjad Ahmad Kichloo	JKNC	24-Oct-2025	23-Oct-2031
2	Chowdhary Mohammad Ramzan	JKNC	24-Oct-2025	23-Oct-2031
3	Gurvinder Singh Oberoi	JKNC	24-Oct-2025	23-Oct-2031
4	Sat Paul Sharma	BJP	24-Oct-2025	23-Oct-2031

== Lok Sabha ==
=== Current constituencies ===
The Lok Sabha (meaning "House of the People") is the lower house of the Parliament of India. The union territory of Jammu and Kashmir elects 5 members and they are directly elected by the electorates of Jammu and Kashmir. Members are elected for five years. The number of seats, allocated to the state/union territory are determined by the population of the state/union territory.

Lok Sabha constituencies of Jammu and Kashmir

Keys: BJP (2) JKNC (2) Independent (politician) (1)
Source: Parliament of India (Lok Sabha)

No.	Name	Reserved for (SC/ST/None)	Assembly constituency segment	Current member	Party
1	Baramulla	None	1. Karnah; 2. Trehgam; 3. Kupwara; 4. Lolab; 5. Handwara; 6. Langate; 7. Sopore; 8. Rafiabad; 9. Uri; 10.Baramulla; 11. Gulmarg; 12. Wagoora Kreeri; 13. Pattan; 14. Sonawari; 15. Bandipora; 16. Gurez; 27. Budgam; 28. Beerwah	Sheikh Abdul Rashid	Independent
2	Srinagar	None	17. Kangan; 18. Ganderbal; 19. Hazratbal; 21. Habba Kadal; 22. Lal Chowk; 22. Channapora; 24. Zadibal; 25. Eidgah; 26. Central Shalteng; 29. Khan Sahib; 30. Charari Sharief; 31. Chadoora; 32. Pampore; 33. Pulwama; 34. Pulwama; 35. Rajpora; 37.Shopian	Aga Syed Ruhullah Mehdi	Jammu & Kashmir National Conference
3	Anantnag-Rajouri	None	36. Zainapora; 38. D.H Pora; 39. Kulgam; 40. Devsar; 41. Dooru; 42. Kokernag; 43. Anantnag West; 44. Anantnag; 45. Srigufwara–Bijbehara; 46. Shangus; 47. Pahalgam; 84. Nowshera; 85. Rajouri; 86. Budhal; 87. Thannamandi; 88. Surankote; 89. Poonch Haveli; 90. Mendhar	Mian Altaf Ahmed Larvi	Jammu & Kashmir National Conference
4	Udhampur	None	48. Inderwal; 49. Kishtwar; 50. Padder-Nagseni; 51. Bhadarwah; 52. Doda; 53. Doda West; 54. Ramban; 55. Banihal; 59. Udhampur West; 60. Udhampur East; 61. Chenani; 62. Ramnagar; 63. Bani; 64. Billawar; 65. Basholi; 66. Jasrota; 67. Kathua; 68. Hiranagar	Dr. Jitendra Singh	Bharatiya Janata Party
5	Jammu	None	56. Gulabgarh; 57. Reasi; 58. Shri Mata Vaishno Devi; 69. Ramgarh; 70. Samba; 71. Vijaypur; 72. Bishnah; 73. Suchetgarh; 74. R.S. Pora; 75. Bahu; 76. Jammu East; 77. Nagrota; 78. Jammu West; 79. Jammu North; 74. Bishnah; 80. Marh; 81. Akhnoor; 82. Chhamb; 83. Kalankote	Jugal Kishore Sharma	Bharatiya Janata Party

== See also ==
- List of constituencies of the Lok Sabha
- List of constituencies of the Jammu and Kashmir Legislative Assembly
