= Anantnag–Rajouri Lok Sabha constituency =

Constituency of the Lok Sabha in India

Coordinates: 33.73°N 75.15°E

Anantnag–Rajouri JK-3
- Lok Sabha constituency

Constituency details
- Country: India
- Region: North India
- Union Territory: Jammu and Kashmir
- Assembly constituencies: 18: Anantnag, Anantnag West, Budhal, Devsar, D. H. Pora, Dooru, Kokernag, Kulgam, Mendhar, Nowshera, Pahalgam, Poonch Haveli, Rajouri, Shangus–Anantnag East, Srigufwara–Bijbehara, Surankote, Thannamandi and Zainapora
- Established: 2022
- Reservation: None

Member of Parliament
- 18th Lok Sabha
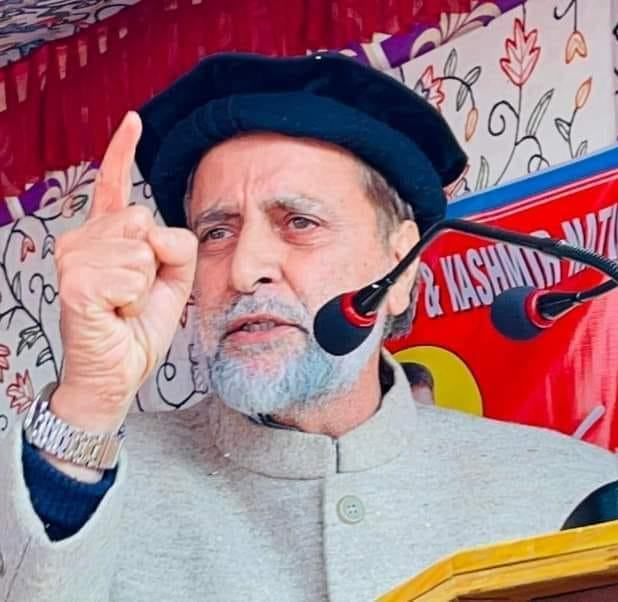
- Incumbent Mian Altaf Ahmed Larvi
- Party: JKNC
- Alliance: INDIA
- Elected year: 2024

Anantnag–Rajouri Lok Sabha constituency is one of the five Lok Sabha (parliamentary) constituencies in Jammu and Kashmir in northern India.

== Assembly segments ==
AC No.	AC Name	District	Member	Party
36	Zainapora	Shopian	Showkat Hussain	JKNC
38	D. H. Pora	Kulgam	Sakina Itoo	JKNC
39	Kulgam	Kulgam	Mohammed Yousuf Tarigami	CPI(M)
40	Devsar	Kulgam	Peerzada Feroze Ahamad	JKNC
41	Dooru	Anantnag	Ghulam Ahmad Mir	INC
42	Kokernag (ST)	Anantnag	Zafar Ali Khatana	JKNC
43	Anantnag West	Anantnag	Abdul Majeed Bhat	JKNC
44	Anantnag	Anantnag	Peerzada Mohammad Syed	INC
45	Srigufwara- Bijbehra	Anantnag	Bashir Ahmad Shah Veeri	JKNC
46	Shangus-Anantnag East	Anantnag	Reyaz Ahmad Khan	JKNC
47	Pahalgam	Anantnag	Altaf Ahmad Wani	JKNC
84	Nowshera	Rajouri	Surinder Kumar Choudhary	JKNC
85	Rajouri (ST)	Rajouri	Iftkar Ahmed	INC
86	Budhal (ST)	Rajouri	Javaid Iqbal	JKNC
87	Thannamandi (ST)	Rajouri	Muzaffar Iqbal Khan	IND
88	Surankote (ST)	Poonch	Choudhary Mohammad Akram	IND
89	Poonch Haveli	Poonch	Ajaz Ahmed Jan	JKNC
90	Mendhar (ST)	Poonch	Javed Ahmed Rana	JKNC

== Members of Parliament ==
Year	Winner	Party
Till 2022 :See Anantnag and Jammu
2024	Mian Altaf Ahmed Larvi	Jammu & Kashmir National Conference

== Election results ==
=== 2024 ===
2024 Indian general elections: Anantnag-Rajouri
Party	Candidate	Votes	%	±%
JKNC	Mian Altaf Larvi	521,836	50.85	
JKPDP	Mehbooba Mufti	2,40,042	23.39	
JKAP	Zafar Iqbal Khan Manhas	1,42,195	13.86	
NOTA	None of the Above	6,223	0.61	
Majority		2,81,794	27.46	
Turnout		10,26,148	54.46	
JKNC win (new seat)				

== See also ==
- Anantnag Lok Sabha constituency
- Jammu Lok Sabha constituency
- Anantnag district
- Rajouri district
- Kulgam district
- Poonch district
- Shopian district
- List of constituencies of the Lok Sabha
