= Noorabad Assembly constituency =

Constituency of the Jammu and Kashmir Legislative Assembly

Coordinates: 33.84°N 74.78°E

Noorabad
- Former constituency for the Jammu and Kashmir Legislative Assembly

Constituency details
- Country: India
- State: Jammu and Kashmir
- District: Kulgam
- Established: 1962
- Abolished: 2018

Noorabad was a legislative constituency in the Jammu and Kashmir Legislative Assembly of Union territory of Jammu and Kashmir, India. Noorabad was also part of Anantnag Lok Sabha constituency until its dissolution and is now known as DH PORA assembly constituency.

== Members of the Legislative Assembly ==
Election	Member	Party
1962	Ghulam Hussain Itoo	Jammu and Kashmir National Conference
1967	Abdul Aziz Zargar	Indian National Congress
1972	Wali Mohammad Itoo	Jammu and Kashmir National Conference
1977	Wali Mohammad Itoo	Jammu and Kashmir National Conference
1983	Wali Mohammad Itoo	Jammu and Kashmir National Conference
1987	Wali Mohammad Itoo	Jammu and Kashmir National Conference
1996	Sakina Itoo	Jammu & Kashmir National Conference
2002	Abdul Aziz Zargar	Jammu & Kashmir National Conference
2008	Sakina Itoo	Jammu & Kashmir National Conference
2014	Abdul Majid Padder	Jammu and Kashmir Peoples Democratic Party

== Election results ==
=== Assembly Election 2014 ===
2014 Jammu and Kashmir Legislative Assembly election : Noorabad
Party	Candidate	Votes	%	±%
JKPDP	Abdul Majid Padder	28,698	48.36%	▲22.93
JKNC	Sakina Itoo	24,990	42.11%	▲6.88
INC	Manzoor Ahmad Zargar	1,410	2.38%	▼21.83
NOTA	None of the Above	750	1.26%	New
Independent	Mushtaq Ahmad Doie	725	1.22%	New
BJP	Mushtaq Ahmad Malik	648	1.09%	New
BSP	Abdur Rahman Magrey	474	0.80%	▼0.00
Margin of victory		3,708	6.25%	▼3.55
Turnout		59,339	80.89%	▲6.79
Registered electors		73,355		▲17.93
JKPDP gain from JKNC		Swing	▲13.13	

=== Assembly Election 2008 ===
2008 Jammu and Kashmir Legislative Assembly election : Noorabad
Party	Candidate	Votes	%	±%
JKNC	Sakina Itoo	16,240	35.23%	▲8.08
JKPDP	Abdul Aziz Zargar	11,722	25.43%	▼4.31
INC	Abdul Majid Padder	11,156	24.20%	▲9.48
JKANC	Gulzar Ahmad Dar	3,043	6.60%	New
Independent	Bashir Ahmad Malik	956	2.07%	New
Independent	Abdul Rashid Bhat	606	1.31%	New
Independent	Arshid Hussain Baba	502	1.09%	New
LJP	Manzoor Ahmad Dar	429	0.93%	New
BSP	Syed Gowher Rashid Andrabi	370	0.80%	New
SP	Abdul Majeed Parray	323	0.70%	New
Margin of victory		4,518	9.80%	▲7.21
Turnout		46,092	74.10%	▲50.70
Registered electors		62,202		▲19.74
JKNC gain from JKPDP		Swing	▲5.49	

=== Assembly Election 2002 ===
2002 Jammu and Kashmir Legislative Assembly election : Noorabad
Party	Candidate	Votes	%	±%
JKPDP	Abdul Aziz Zargar	3,616	29.74%	New
JKNC	Sakeena Akhtar	3,301	27.15%	▼25.97
INC	Abdul Majid Padder	1,790	14.72%	▲9.91
Independent	Mehar Noor Ahamad	1,716	14.12%	New
CPI(M)	Atta Mohammed	936	7.70%	New
BJP	Mushtaq Malik	310	2.55%	New
Independent	Altaf Ahmad Padder	302	2.48%	New
RJD	Gulzar Dar	186	1.53%	New
Margin of victory		315	2.59%	▼17.97
Turnout		12,157	23.41%	▼33.77
Registered electors		51,946		▲25.69
JKPDP gain from JKNC		Swing	▼23.38	

=== Assembly Election 1996 ===
1996 Jammu and Kashmir Legislative Assembly election : Noorabad
Party	Candidate	Votes	%	±%
JKNC	Sakeena Akhtar	12,553	53.12%	New
JD	Gulzar Dar	7,694	32.56%	New
INC	A. R. Lone	1,138	4.82%	▼71.69
JKAL	G.R. Parray	810	3.43%	New
Independent	Dilawar Naik	807	3.42%	New
JKNPP	Ajit Singh	629	2.66%	New
Margin of victory		4,859	20.56%	▼35.00
Turnout		23,631	58.70%	▼23.75
Registered electors		41,329		▼5.69
JKNC gain from INC		Swing	▼23.39	

=== Assembly Election 1987 ===
1987 Jammu and Kashmir Legislative Assembly election : Noorabad
Party	Candidate	Votes	%	±%
INC	Abdul Aziz Zargar	27,132	76.51%	▲43.76
Independent	Bashir Ahmad Malik	7,430	20.95%	New
Independent	Aman Gull	538	1.52%	New
Independent	Syed Akbar Khan	362	1.02%	New
Margin of victory		19,702	55.56%	▲33.95
Turnout		35,462	82.33%	▲4.27
Registered electors		43,821		▲15.23
INC gain from JKNC		Swing	▲22.15	

=== Assembly Election 1983 ===
1983 Jammu and Kashmir Legislative Assembly election : Noorabad
Party	Candidate	Votes	%	±%
JKNC	Wali Mohammad Itoo	15,846	54.36%	▼4.40
INC	Abdul Aziz Zargar	9,548	32.75%	▲6.28
Independent	Bashir Ahmed	2,713	9.31%	New
Independent	Bashir Ahmad Mir	1,045	3.58%	New
Margin of victory		6,298	21.60%	▼10.69
Turnout		29,152	79.97%	▲8.16
Registered electors		38,029		▲23.37
JKNC hold		Swing	▼4.40	

=== Assembly Election 1977 ===
1977 Jammu and Kashmir Legislative Assembly election : Noorabad
Party	Candidate	Votes	%	±%
JKNC	Wali Mohammad Itoo	12,407	58.76%	New
INC	Abdul Aziz Zargar	5,589	26.47%	▼67.49
JP	Abdul Malid Matoo	2,538	12.02%	New
Independent	Hamid Ullah Bhat	581	2.75%	New
Margin of victory		6,818	32.29%	▼55.94
Turnout		21,115	71.74%	▼9.89
Registered electors		30,825		▼4.66
JKNC gain from INC		Swing	▼35.20	

=== Assembly Election 1972 ===
1972 Jammu and Kashmir Legislative Assembly election : Noorabad
Party	Candidate	Votes	%	±%
INC	Abdul Aziz Zargar	23,815	93.96%	New
Independent	Abdul Aziz Sheikh	1,454	5.74%	New
Margin of victory		22,361	88.23%	
Turnout		25,345	79.40%	▲78.39
Registered electors		32,332		▲9.10
INC hold		Swing		

=== Assembly Election 1967 ===
1967 Jammu and Kashmir Legislative Assembly election : Noorabad
Party	Candidate	Votes	%	±%
INC	Abdul Aziz Zargar	Unopposed		
Registered electors		29,634		▲20.49
INC gain from JKNC		Swing		

=== Assembly Election 1962 ===
1962 Jammu and Kashmir Legislative Assembly election : Noorabad
Party	Candidate	Votes	%	±%
JKNC	Ghulam Hussain Khan	Unopposed		
Registered electors		24,594		
JKNC win (new seat)				

== See also ==
- Pampore
