= Itoo (surname) =

Itoo is a Kashmiri surname. Notable people with the surname include:

- Sakina Itoo
- Wali Mohammad Itoo
