= Syed Farooq Ahmad Andrabi =

Indian politician

Minister of Hajj and Auqaf Government of Jammu and Kashmir
- In office 2016–2017
- Governor: Narinder Nath Vohra
- Chief Minister: Mehbooba Mufti
- Succeeded by: Tassaduq Hussain Mufti

Member Jammu and Kashmir Legislative Assembly
- In office 2014–2018
- Governor: Narinder Nath Vohra
- Chief Minister: Mehbooba Mufti
- Succeeded by: Ghulam Ahmad Mir
- Constituency: Dooru

Personal details
- Born: 1959 (age 66–67) Doru Shahabad, Jammu and Kashmir
- Parent: Syed Shah Andrabi (father)
- Education: BA
- Alma mater: University of Kashmir

Syed Farooq Ahmad Andrabi (born c. 1959) is an Indian politician and the former member of Jammu and Kashmir Legislative Assembly. He represented Dooru assembly constituency of Anantnag district in 2014. He was appointed to the state ministry in 2016 and subsequently served as minister for Hajj and Auqaf until he resigned from the ministry in December 2017 in an attempt to appoint his nephew Tassaduq Hussain Mufti to the post.

He also served as minister for Kashmir Irrigation & Flood Control Department, Public Health Engineering Department, and Irrigation & Flood Control Department. Prior to his resignation, he served minister for Power Development Department and Department of Industry & Commerce.

== Biography ==
He was born to Syed Shah Andrabi around 1959 in Doru Shahabad, Jammu and Kashmir. He graduated from an uncertain collage. Later in 1980, he obtained Bachelor's of Arts degree in Commerce from the University of Kashmir.

== Electoral performance ==
Election	Constituency	Party	Result	Votes %	Opposition Candidate	Opposition Party	Opposition vote %	Ref
2014	Dooru	JKPDP	Won	37.58%	Ghulam Ahmad Mir	INC	37.24%	
2008	Dooru	JKPDP	Lost	22.69%	Ghulam Ahmad Mir	INC	36.19%	
2002	Dooru	JKPDP	Lost	10.15%	Ghulam Ahmad Mir	INC	66.19%	
