= Damhal Hanji Pora Assembly constituency =

Constituency of the Jammu and Kashmir legislative assembly in India

D. H. Pora
- Constituency No. 38 for the Jammu and Kashmir Legislative Assembly

Constituency details
- Country: India
- State: Jammu and Kashmir
- District: Kulgam
- Lok Sabha constituency: Anantnag–Rajouri
- Established: 2022

Member of Legislative Assembly
- Incumbent Sakina Itoo
- Party: Jammu and Kashmir National Conference
- Elected year: 2024

Damhal Hanji Pora or D. H. Pora is one of the 90 constituencies in the Jammu and Kashmir Legislative Assembly of Jammu and Kashmir a north state of India. Damhal Hanji Pora is also part of Anantnag–Rajouri Lok Sabha constituency.

== Members of the Legislative Assembly ==
Election	Member	Party
1962	Ghulam Mohammad Itoo	Jammu and Kashmir National Conference
1967	Abdul Aziz Zargar	Indian National Congress
1972	Wali Mohammad Itoo	Jammu and Kashmir National Conference
1977	Wali Mohammad Itoo	Jammu and Kashmir National Conference
1983	Wali Mohammad Itoo	Jammu and Kashmir National Conference
1987	Wali Mohammad Itoo	Jammu and Kashmir National Conference
1996	Sakina Itoo	Jammu & Kashmir National Conference
1967	Abdul Aziz Zargar	Indian National Congress
2008	Sakina Itoo	Jammu & Kashmir National Conference
2014	Abdul Majid Padder	Jammu and Kashmir Peoples Democratic Party
2024	Sakina Itoo	Jammu and Kashmir National Conference

== Election results ==
=== Assembly Election 2024 ===
2024 Jammu and Kashmir Legislative Assembly election : Damhal Hanji Pora
Party	Candidate	Votes	%	±%
JKNC	Sakina Itoo	36,623	53.45%	New
JKPDP	Gulzar Ahmad Dar	19,174	27.98%	New
Independent	Mohammed Arif Dar	4,054	5.92%	New
JKAP	Abdul Majeed Padder	2,974	4.34%	New
JD(U)	Mohammad Ayub Matoo	2,620	3.82%	New
NOTA	None of the Above	2,390	3.49%	New
Independent	Sajad Ahmad Dar	685	1.00%	New
Margin of victory		17,449	25.47%	
Turnout		68,520	69.19%	
Registered electors		99,037		
JKNC win (new seat)				

== See also ==
- List of constituencies of the Jammu and Kashmir Legislative Assembly
