= Murtaza Khan =

Murtaza Khan may refer to:

- Ghulam Murtaza Khan (1760–1840), 19th-century Indian painter from Delhi
- Ghulam Murtaza Khan Jatoi, Pakistani politician
- Murtaza Ahmed Khan, politician from Jammu and Kashmir
- Murtaza Ali Khan, 20th-century Nawab of Rampur (ruler of the Indian princely state)
- Murtaza Ali Khan (film critic), Indian film critic and journalist
- Shaikh Farid Bukhari, 17th-century Mughal noble bearing the title Murtaza Khan
- Murtaza Khan (ruler), 20th-century Nawab of Radhanpur (ruler of the Indian princely state)
