= 2007 elections in India =

Elections in India
← 2006	2007	2008 →

The State Assembly elections in India, 2007 took place between 8 February 2007 and 23 February 2007 for Indian States of [Himachal Pradesh, Manipur, Punjab, Uttarakhand and Uttar Pradesh. Elections for Gujarat were held in December 2007. Elections for Goa were held June 2, 2007 to June 5, 2007.

== Results ==
Date(s)	State	Government before election	Chief Minister before election	Government after election	Chief Minister after election	Maps
30 January 2007	Punjab	Indian National Congress	Amarinder Singh	Shiromani Akali Dal	Parkash Singh Badal	
30 January 2007	Punjab	Indian National Congress	Amarinder Singh	Bharatiya Janata Party	Parkash Singh Badal	
28 January 2012	Manipur	Indian National Congress	Okram Ibobi Singh	Indian National Congress	Okram Ibobi Singh	
21 February 2007	Uttarakhand	Indian National Congress	N. D. Tiwari	Bharatiya Janata Party	B. C. Khanduri	
21 February 2007	Uttarakhand	Indian National Congress	N. D. Tiwari	Uttarakhand Kranti Dal	B. C. Khanduri	
7 April 2007 – 8 May 2007	Uttar Pradesh	Samajwadi Party	Mulayam Singh Yadav	Bahujan Samaj Party	Mayawati	
2 June 2007	Goa	Indian National Congress	Pratapsingh Rane	Indian National Congress	Digambar Kamat	
2 June 2007	Goa	Indian National Congress	Pratapsingh Rane	Nationalist Congress Party	Digambar Kamat	
2 June 2007	Goa	Indian National Congress	Pratapsingh Rane	Maharashtrawadi Gomantak Party	Digambar Kamat	
14 November and 19 December 2007	Himachal Pradesh	Indian National Congress	Virbhadra Singh	Bharatiya Janata Party	Prem Kumar Dhumal	
11 and 16 December 2007	Gujarat	Bharatiya Janata Party	Narendra Modi	Bharatiya Janata Party	Narendra Modi	

Counting of votes was done on 27 February 2007 and the results were announced on the same date.

The Indian National Congress, who were the incumbents in Punjab and Uttarakhand lost their majorities in both states.

=== Goa ===
Rank	Party	Seats Contested	Seats Won
1	Indian National Congress	32	16
3	Nationalist Congress Party	6	3
4	Save Goa Front	17	2
2	Bharatiya Janata Party	33	14
4	Maharashtrawadi Gomantak	26	2
5	United Goans Democratic Party	11	1
4	Independent	49	2
	Total		40

Congress emerge as single largest party after results.
Congress formed government in alliance with NCP and SGF.
SGF later merged in Congress to raise its tally to 18.

=== Gujarat ===
Ranks	Party	Seats Contested	Seats Won	% Votes
1	Bharatiya Janata Party	182	117	49.12
2	Indian National Congress	173	59	38.00
3	Nationalist Congress Party	10	3	1.05
4	Independent	182	2	6.61
5	Janata Dal (United)	35	1	0.66
6	Bahujan Samaj Party	166	0	2.62
	Total		182	

=== Himachal Pradesh ===
Rank	Party	Seats Contested	Seats won	% votes
1	Bharatiya Janata Party	68	41	43.78
2	Indian National Congress	67	23	38.9
3	Independent	60	3	7.97
4	Bahujan Samaj Party	67	1	7.26
	Total		68	

=== Jammu and Kashmir ===
Assembly Constituency		Turnout	Winner				Runner Up				Margin
#k	Names	%	Candidate	Party	Votes	%	Candidate	Party	Votes	%	Margin
1	Poonch Haveli	68.51%	Jahangir Hussain Mir	INC	20,697	31.14%	Yash Paul Sharma	Independent	16,299	24.52%	4,398

=== Manipur ===
Elections in Manipur were held in three phases on 8 February 14 and 23 February.

Party	Votes	%	Seats	+/–
Indian National Congress	507,518	34.30	30	+10
Manipur Peoples Party	228,670	15.45	5	+3
Nationalist Congress Party	127,005	8.58	5	+2
Rashtriya Janata Dal	98,694	6.67	3	New
Communist Party of India	85,643	5.79	4	–1
National People's Party	51,192	3.46	3	New
Manipur State Congress Party	27,505	1.86	0	–7
Lok Jan Shakti Party	22,233	1.50	0	–2
Samajwadi Party	13,373	0.90	0	New
Bharatiya Janata Party	12,536	0.85	0	-4
Janata Dal (Secular)	7,144	0.48	0	New
Janata Dal (United)	4,333	0.29	0	0
People's Democratic Alliance	1,508	0.10	0	New
Communist Party of India (Marxist)	1,232	0.08	0	0
Samata Party	861	0.06	0	–3
Revolutionary Socialist Party	808	0.05	0	New
Naga National Party	562	0.04	0	0
All India Forward Bloc	109	0.01	0	New
Independents	288,661	19.51	10	+10
Total	1,479,587	100.00	60	0
Valid votes	1,479,587	99.97		
Invalid/blank votes	373	0.03		
Total votes	1,479,960	100.00		
Registered voters/turnout	1,707,204	86.69		
Source: ECI

The Indian National Congress won by a simple majority. A Congress-led coalition government was sworn in on 1 March 2007 with Okram Ibobi Singh as the Chief Minister.

=== Punjab ===
Elections in Punjab was held on 13 February 2007.

Rank	Party	Seats Contested	Seats Won	% Votes
1	Shiromani Akali Dal	93	48	37.09
3	Bharatiya Janata Party	23	19	8.28
2	Indian National Congress	116	44	40.90
4	Independent	431	5	6.82
5	Bahujan Samaj Party	115	0	4.13
	Total		117	

A Shiromani Akali Dal-Bharatiya Janata Party coalition government sworn on 2 March 2007 with Parkash Singh Badal as the Chief Minister.

=== Uttarakhand ===
Elections in Uttarakhand was held on 21 February 2007.

Rank	Party	Seats Contested	Seats Won	% Votes
1	Bharatiya Janata Party	70	35	31.90
4	Uttarakhand Kranti Dal	61	3	5.49
4	Independent	240	3	10.81
2	Indian National Congress	70	21	29.59
3	Bahujan Samaj Party	70	8	11.76
	Total		70/70	

The Bharatiya Janata Party emerged as the largest party with 35 seats in a house of 70. They were still one short of the majority to form a government. After much wrangling it was announced that the Uttarakhand Kranti Dal and the three independents would be supporting the government. Elections to Bajpur are still to take place. The incumbent Indian National Congress Government lost as they had only 21 seats out of 70 seats.

After protracted discussions it was announced the B. C. Khanduri would be Chief Minister and B. S. Koshyari was to manage party work.

=== Uttar Pradesh ===
Rank	Party	Seats Contested	Seats Won	% Votes
1	Bahujan Samaj Party	403	206	30.43
2	Samajwadi Party	393	97	25.43
3	Bharatiya Janata Party	350	51	16.97
4	Indian National Congress	393	22	8.61
5	Rashtriya Lok Dal	254	10	3.70
6	Independent	258	9	6.97
7	Rashtriya Parivartan Dal	14	2	0.20
8	Janata Dal (United)	16	1	0.42
8	Uttar Pradesh United Democratic Front	54	1	0.35
8	Rashtriya Swabhimaan Party	122	1	0.26
8	Jan Morcha	118	1	0.60
8	Bharatiya Jan Shakti	66	1	0.24
8	Akhil Bhartiya Loktantrik Congress	2	1	0.18
	Total		403	

Elections in Uttar Pradesh were held in seven phases during April and May 2007. In the end, Mayawati's B.S.P won this election.

== See also ==
- N. Gopalaswami
