= Mian Mehar Ali =

Indian politician

Member of Jammu and Kashmir Legislative Assembly
- Incumbent
- Assumed office 8 October 2024
- Preceded by: Mian Altaf Ahmed
- Constituency: Kangan

Personal details
- Political party: Jammu & Kashmir National Conference
- Profession: Politician

Mian Mehar Ali is an Indian politician from Jammu & Kashmir. He is a Member of the Jammu & Kashmir Legislative Assembly from 2024, representing Kangan Assembly constituency as a Member of the Jammu & Kashmir National Conference party.

== See also ==
- 2024 Jammu & Kashmir Legislative Assembly election
- Jammu and Kashmir Legislative Assembly
