= Kangan Assembly constituency =

Constituency of the Jammu and Kashmir Legislative Assembly

Coordinates: 34.26°N 74.90°E

Kangan
- Constituency No. 17 for the Jammu and Kashmir Legislative Assembly

Constituency details
- Country: India
- State: Jammu and Kashmir
- District: Ganderbal
- Lok Sabha constituency: Srinagar
- Established: 1962
- Reservation: ST

Member of Legislative Assembly
- Incumbent Mian Mehar Ali
- Party: Jammu and Kashmir National Conference
- Elected year: 2024

Kangan Assembly constituency is one of the 90 constituencies in the Jammu and Kashmir Legislative Assembly of Jammu and Kashmir a north state of India. Kangan is also part of Srinagar Lok Sabha constituency.

== Members of the Legislative Assembly ==
Election	Member	Party
1962	Mian Nizam Ud-Din	Indian National Congress
1967	Mian Bashir Ahmed	Indian National Congress
1972	Mian Bashir Ahmed	Indian National Congress
1977	Mian Bashir Ahmed	Jammu & Kashmir National Conference
1983	Sheikh Abdul Jabar	Jammu & Kashmir National Conference
1987	Mian Altaf Ahmed Larvi	Indian National Congress
1996	Mian Altaf Ahmed Larvi	Jammu & Kashmir National Conference
2002	Mian Altaf Ahmed Larvi	Jammu & Kashmir National Conference
2008	Mian Altaf Ahmed Larvi	Jammu & Kashmir National Conference
2014	Mian Altaf Ahmed Larvi	Jammu & Kashmir National Conference
2024	Mian Mehar Ali	Jammu and Kashmir National Conference

== Election results ==
=== Assembly Election 2024 ===
2024 Jammu and Kashmir Legislative Assembly election : Kangan
Party	Candidate	Votes	%	±%
JKNC	Mian Mehar Ali	28,907	49.97%	New
JKPDP	Syed Jamat Ali Shah	25,088	43.37%	▼1.13
NOTA	None of the Above	1,564	2.70%	▲1.37
JKAP	Atta Mohammad Khatana	718	1.24%	New
All Jammu and Kashmir Liberal Democratic Party	Mohammed Ayoub Chohan	621	1.07%	New
RPI(A)	Abdul Majeed Baniyea	595	1.03%	New
Anarakshit Samaj Party	Ghulam Rubani Tadwa	354	0.61%	New
Margin of victory		3,819	6.60%	▲3.99
Turnout		57,847	73.49%	▼5.24
Registered electors		78,718		▲13.12
JKNC gain from JKNC		Swing	▲2.86	

=== Assembly Election 2014 ===
2014 Jammu and Kashmir Legislative Assembly election : Kangan
Party	Candidate	Votes	%	±%
JKNC	Mian Altaf Ahmed Larvi	25,812	47.12%	▼7.87
JKPDP	Bashir Ahmed Mir	24,380	44.50%	▲11.60
INC	Ajaz Ahmad Sheikh	889	1.62%	▼0.44
NOTA	None of the Above	731	1.33%	New
Independent	Showkat Hussain Khan	691	1.26%	New
Independent	Ghulam Hassan Rather	608	1.11%	New
BJP	Nazir Ahmad Raina	583	1.06%	▼1.42
JKNPP	Abdul Rashid Ganaie	481	0.88%	▼0.02
JKPC	Mushtaq Ahmad Shah	373	0.68%	New
Margin of victory		1,432	2.61%	▼19.47
Turnout		54,784	78.72%	▲19.19
Registered electors		69,590		▲18.58
JKNC hold		Swing	▼7.87	

=== Assembly Election 2008 ===
2008 Jammu and Kashmir Legislative Assembly election : Kangan
Party	Candidate	Votes	%	±%
JKNC	Mian Altaf Ahmed Larvi	19,210	54.98%	▼9.73
JKPDP	Bashir Ahmed Mir	11,495	32.90%	▲10.24
BJP	Nazir Ahmad Raina	869	2.49%	New
INC	Ghulam Ahmad Rather	721	2.06%	▼1.16
Independent	Rafiq Ahmad	607	1.74%	New
JP	Mohammad Sultan Lone	563	1.61%	New
JKANC	Shabir Ahmad Mir	440	1.26%	New
BSP	Ghulam Mustafa Kasana	429	1.23%	New
JKNPP	Abdul Rashid Ganie	315	0.90%	▼3.06
Independent	Mohammed Amin Sofi	290	0.83%	New
Margin of victory		7,715	22.08%	▼19.97
Turnout		34,939	59.53%	▲7.51
Registered electors		58,688		▲16.32
JKNC hold		Swing	▼9.73	

=== Assembly Election 2002 ===
2002 Jammu and Kashmir Legislative Assembly election : Kangan
Party	Candidate	Votes	%	±%
JKNC	Mian Altaf Ahmed Larvi	16,987	64.71%	▼25.52
JKPDP	Ghulam Mohammed Dar	5,948	22.66%	New
JKNPP	Nazir Ahmad	1,039	3.96%	▲2.16
INC	Abdul Rehman	845	3.22%	▼0.77
Independent	Amin Dar	576	2.19%	New
JKAL	Rashid Ganiee	544	2.07%	New
Independent	Mohammed Khalil Wani	310	1.18%	New
Margin of victory		11,039	42.05%	▼44.18
Turnout		26,249	52.03%	▼9.48
Registered electors		50,452		▲29.91
JKNC hold		Swing	▼25.52	

=== Assembly Election 1996 ===
1996 Jammu and Kashmir Legislative Assembly election : Kangan
Party	Candidate	Votes	%	±%
JKNC	Mian Altaf Ahmed Larvi	21,553	90.23%	▲85.44
INC	Qazi Mohammad Afzal	954	3.99%	▼42.04
Independent	Latief Shah	949	3.97%	New
JKNPP	Nazir Ahmed	430	1.80%	New
Margin of victory		20,599	86.24%	▲71.49
Turnout		23,886	63.29%	▼16.49
Registered electors		38,836		▼4.78
JKNC gain from INC		Swing	▲44.20	

=== Assembly Election 1987 ===
1987 Jammu and Kashmir Legislative Assembly election : Kangan
Party	Candidate	Votes	%	±%
INC	Mian Altaf Ahmed Larvi	14,644	46.04%	▲23.67
Independent	Ghulam Mohammed War	9,952	31.29%	New
Independent	Rasool	3,845	12.09%	New
JKNC	Syeed Mohammed Yousuf	1,523	4.79%	▼63.69
Independent	Ghulam Ahmad	609	1.91%	New
Independent	Ghulam Mohammed Nagray	478	1.50%	New
Independent	Peer Atiquallah	335	1.05%	New
Independent	Gul Bhat	216	0.68%	New
Independent	Mohammed Muzaffer	208	0.65%	New
Margin of victory		4,692	14.75%	▼31.36
Turnout		31,810	80.48%	▲6.05
Registered electors		40,784		▲13.53
INC gain from JKNC		Swing	▼22.44	

=== Assembly Election 1983 ===
1983 Jammu and Kashmir Legislative Assembly election : Kangan
Party	Candidate	Votes	%	±%
JKNC	Sheikh Abdul Jabar	17,696	68.48%	▼18.60
INC	Mohammed Afzal Qazi	5,780	22.37%	New
JI	Ghulam Mohammed War	1,709	6.61%	New
JKNC	Mohammed Yousuf Shah	389	1.51%	▼85.56
Independent	Mohammed Yousuf	269	1.04%	New
Margin of victory		11,916	46.11%	▼28.03
Turnout		25,843	75.51%	▼1.31
Registered electors		35,922		▲10.11
JKNC hold		Swing	▼18.60	

=== Assembly Election 1977 ===
1977 Jammu and Kashmir Legislative Assembly election : Kangan
Party	Candidate	Votes	%	±%
JKNC	Mian Bashir Ahmed	20,808	87.07%	New
JP	Mohammed Afzi	3,090	12.93%	New
Margin of victory		17,718	74.14%	▲13.56
Turnout		23,898	76.12%	▼1.44
Registered electors		32,623		▲16.99
JKNC gain from INC		Swing		

=== Assembly Election 1972 ===
1972 Jammu and Kashmir Legislative Assembly election : Kangan
Party	Candidate	Votes	%	±%
INC	Mian Bashir Ahmed	16,593	79.66%	New
JI	Ahad Bhat	3,974	19.08%	New
SWA	Abdul Rehman Magrey	262	1.26%	New
Margin of victory		12,619	60.58%	
Turnout		20,829	76.75%	▲74.70
Registered electors		27,885		▲7.26
INC hold		Swing		

=== Assembly Election 1967 ===
1967 Jammu and Kashmir Legislative Assembly election : Kangan
Party	Candidate	Votes	%	±%
INC	Mian Bashir Ahmed	Unopposed		
Registered electors		25,997		▲8.74
INC gain from JKNC		Swing		

=== Assembly Election 1962 ===
1962 Jammu and Kashmir Legislative Assembly election : Kangan
Party	Candidate	Votes	%	±%
INC	Main Nizam Ud-Din	Unopposed		
Registered electors		23,907		
INC win (new seat)				

== See also ==
- Kangan
- List of constituencies of Jammu and Kashmir Legislative Assembly
