= Murtaza Ahmed Khan =

Indian politician

Murtaza A. Khan is an Indian politician. He was a Member of the Legislative Council in the State of Jammu and Kashmir, India.

Born in village Narol of Poonch District of the Indian state of Jammu and Kashmir, Murtaza A. Khan is a well known lawyer and widely travelled person. He got bachelor's degree in law from Aligarh Muslim University, Master's from USA and engaged in legal profession in Canada. After several years of stay in North America, he returned to Jammu and Kashmir and resumed legal profession. He contested from BJP seat in Mendhar in 2024 Assembly elections but he lost to JKNC's Javed Ahmed Khan .

He joined Jammu and Kashmir Peoples Democratic Party, headed by former Indian Home Minister Mufti Mohammed Sayeed at its inception in July 1999 as a founder member, authored its Constitution and served it in various capacities. Was elected as Member of the Jammu and Kashmir Legislative Council (Upper House of the State's bicameral legislature) in February 2007. He is leader of PDP's legislature party in the Upper House. He was appointed PDP's General Secretary in August 2007. Known for his resolute bearing, he commands massive following and support of the Punjabi and Pothwari/Pahari speaking Muslim communities across Jammu and Kashmir.

As a member of the Legislative Council, he has served on various Standing Committees as a member and notably as chairman of the Committee on Government Assurances and Committee on Privileges Departmental Committees. He has also served as member on the joint (financial) committees like Public Accounts Committee and Estimates Committee. He also served as member of the Joint Select Committee on Inter District Recruitment Bill. He was appointed as Chairman of a House Committee constituted during the Summer Session 2012 to probe an issue of land grabbing by a sitting minister in Omar Abdullah's Cabinet but immediately before its second meeting scheduled to be held in mid November 2012, the Committee was controversially disbanded in the wake of withdrawal of three of its members belonging to the ruling alliance parties for unknown reasons.

He represented his Party at various national level seminars and conferences on political resolution of the K issue including the Round Table Conference held in April 2011 at Srinagar by the Padgoankar lead three member team of interlocutors appointed by Indian Prime Minister Manmohan Singh for resolution of the issue.

== Electoral performance ==
Election	Constituency	Party	Result	Votes %	Opposition Candidate	Opposition Party	Opposition vote %	Ref
2024	Mendhar	BJP	Lost	20.87%	Javed Ahmed Rana	JKNC	38.89%	
2014	Mendhar	INC	Lost	11.11%	Javed Ahmed Rana	JKNC	47.75%	
