= Qamar Hussain =

Indian politician (born 1948)

Qamar Hussain Choudhary (born 1948) is an Indian politician from Jammu and Kashmir. He was the MLA from Rajouri Assembly constituency in Rajouri district. He won the 2014 Jammu and Kashmir Legislative Assembly election representing the Jammu and Kashmir People's Democratic Party. He was nominated again to contest the Thanamandi Assembly constituency which was a newly created seat, reserved for Scheduled Tribe community in the 2024 election by JKPDP but lost to Independent candidate Muzaffar Iqbal Khan and finishing 3rd, behind Independent and BJP candidates.

== Early life and education ==
Qamar is from Thanamandi, Rajouri district, Jammu and Kashmir. He is the son of late Lal Din. He is an advocate and his wife is a government teacher. He completed his B.A. and then completed his L.L.B. in 1987 at University of Jammu.

== Career ==
Qamar won from Rajouri Assembly constituency representing the Jammu and Kashmir People's Democratic Party in the 2014 Jammu and Kashmir Legislative Assembly election. He polled 26,954 votes and defeated his nearest rival, Chowdhary Talib Hussain of the Bharatiya Janata Party, by a margin of 2,490 votes. In 2024 elections, he contested from Thannamandi constituency as a candidate of Jammu and Kashmir Peoples Democratic Party but lost to Muzaffar Iqbal Khan, securing 21,986 votes and finishing behind the BJP candidate.

== Electoral performance ==
Election	Constituency	Party	Result	Votes %	Opposition Candidate	Opposition Party	Opposition vote %	Ref
2024	Thanamandi	JKPDP	Lost	24.06%	Muzaffar Iqbal Khan	Independent	35.72%	
2014	Rajouri	JKPDP	Won	30.63%	Chowdhary Talib Hussain	BJP	27.80%	
2008	Rajouri	Independent	Lost	9.58%	Shabir Ahmed Khan	INC	13.63%	
2002	Rajouri	INC	Lost	31.02%	Mohammed Aslam	JKNC	40.00%	
