= Shah Mohammad Tantray =

Indian politician (born 1956)

Member of the Jammu and Kashmir Legislative Assembly
- In office 2014–2019
- Constituency: Poonch Haveli

Personal details
- Party: Jammu and Kashmir National Conference

Shah Mohammad Tantray (born 1956) is an Indian politician from Jammu and Kashmir. He was an MLA from Poonch Haveli Assembly constituency in Poonch district. He won the 2014 Jammu and Kashmir Legislative Assembly election representing the Jammu and Kashmir People's Democratic Party. He contested the same seat representing Jammu and Kashmir Apni Party in the 2024 Assembly election but lost. and finished third behind JKNC and BJP candidate.

== Early life and education ==
Tantray is from Haveli, Poonch district, Jammu and Kashmir. He is the son of Ghulam Mohammad Tantray. He completed his B.A. in 1977 from University of Jammu.

== Career ==
Tantray won from Poonch Haveli Assembly constituency representing the Jammu and Kashmir People's Democratic Party in the 2014 Jammu and Kashmir Legislative Assembly election. He polled 19,488 votes and defeated his nearest rival, Ajaz Ahmed Jan of Jammu and Kashmir National Conference, by a margin of 3,512 votes. He lost in 2024.

== Electoral performance ==
Election	Constituency	Party	Result	Votes %	Opposition Candidate	Opposition Party	Opposition vote %	Ref
2024	Poonch Haveli	JKAP	Lost	9.29%	Ajaz Ahmed Jan	JKNC	42.72%	
2014	Poonch Haveli	JKPDP	Won	25.57%	Ajaz Ahmed Jan	JKNC	20.96%	
