= Peerzada Feroze Ahamad =

Indian politician

Member of Jammu and Kashmir Legislative Assembly
- Incumbent
- Assumed office 8 October 2024
- Preceded by: Mohammad Amin Bhat
- Constituency: Devsar Assembly constituency

Personal details
- Political party: Jammu & Kashmir National Conference
- Profession: Politician

Peerzada Feroze Ahamad is an Indian politician from Jammu & Kashmir. He is a Member of the Jammu & Kashmir Legislative Assembly from 2024, representing Devsar Assembly constituency as a Member of the Jammu & Kashmir National Conference party.

== Electoral performance ==
Election	Constituency	Party	Result	Votes %	Opposition Candidate	Opposition Party	Opposition vote %	Ref
2024	Devsar, Jammu and Kashmir	JKNC	Won	27.91%	Mohammed Sartaj Madni	JKPDP	26.63%	

== See also ==
- 2024 Jammu & Kashmir Legislative Assembly election
- Jammu and Kashmir Legislative Assembly
