= Sheikh Abdul Jabbar =

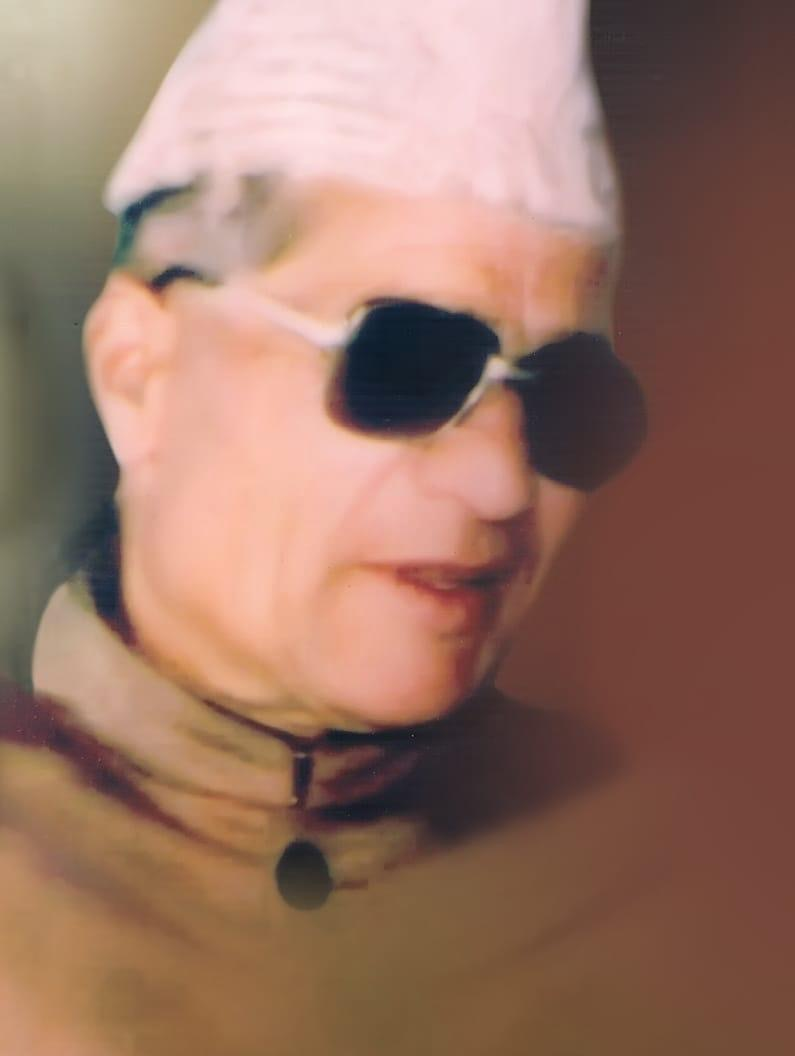

Member of the Jammu and Kashmir Legislative Assembly
- In office 1983–1986
- Constituency: Kangan Assembly constituency

Law Minister of Jammu & Kashmir
- In office 1984–1986

Personal details
- Born: 1931 Qasba Lar Ganderbal Kashmir
- Died: 18 April 1990 (aged 58–59) Lar, Ganderbal, Jammu and Kashmir
- Party: Jammu & Kashmir National Conference; Awami National Conference
- Children: Ishfaq Ahmad Sheikh, 1 daughter
- Occupation: Politician, Freedom fighter

Sheikh Abdul Jabbar was an Indian politician and freedom fighter from Jammu and Kashmir. He held various positions in his political career, including serving as a Cabinet Minister, MLA, and MLC.

In 1984, Sheikh Abdul Jabbar left the Jammu & Kashmir National Conference to join the rebel faction led by Ghulam Mohammad Shah. During Shah's tenure as Chief Minister, Abdul Jabbar was appointed as the Law Minister of Jammu & Kashmir. Previously, Sheikh Abdul Jabbar was regarded as a close associate of Sheikh Mohammad Abdullah of the National Conference.

He was assassinated on 18 April 1990, in his hometown of Lar Ganderbal, Kashmir. He was killed by four terrorists who had connections with the Allah Tigers and had returned from Azad Kashmir as members of Hizbul Mujahideen.
