= Inc. =

Inc. or inc may refer to:

- Incorporation (business), as a suffix indicating a corporation
- Inc. (magazine), an American business magazine
- Inc. No World, a Los Angeles–based band
- Increment, in computer programming languages, particularly assembler mnemonics
- Incumbent, the current holder of a political office
- Indian National Congress (INC), one of the two main political parties in India

== See also ==
- INC (disambiguation)
