= List of constituencies of the Jammu and Kashmir Legislative Assembly =

State assembly constituencies in India

Following is the list of the constituencies in the Jammu and Kashmir Legislative Assembly.

The Jammu and Kashmir Legislative Assembly is the unicameral legislature of the Indian union territiry of Jammu and Kashmir. The Legislative Assembly has 90 members, directly elected from single-seat constituencies. Its term is five years, unless dissolved early.

== Constituencies ==
New assembly constituencies

The following is the list of the constituencies of the Jammu and Kashmir Legislative Assembly as of recent-most delimitation of the legislative assembly constituencies in 2022.

AC No.	Name	District	Lok Sabha constituency	Electors (2024)
Kashmir division
1	Karnah	Kupwara	Baramulla	57,951
2	Trehgam	Kupwara	Baramulla	78,569
3	Kupwara	Kupwara	Baramulla	94,956
4	Lolab	Kupwara	Baramulla	90,392
5	Handwara	Kupwara	Baramulla	98,404
6	Langate	Kupwara	Baramulla	1,20,211
7	Sopore	Baramulla	Baramulla	1,12,829
8	Rafiabad	Baramulla	Baramulla	1,12,904
9	Uri	Baramulla	Baramulla	1,04,761
10	Baramulla	Baramulla	Baramulla	1,26,225
11	Gulmarg	Baramulla	Baramulla	90,296
12	Wagoora–Kreeri	Baramulla	Baramulla	72,173
13	Pattan	Baramulla	Baramulla	1,03,069
14	Sonawari	Bandipora	Baramulla	1,20,963
15	Bandipora	Bandipora	Baramulla	1,15,972
16	Gurez (ST)	Bandipora	Baramulla	22,131
17	Kangan (ST)	Ganderbal	Srinagar	78,718
18	Ganderbal	Ganderbal	Srinagar	1,29,013
19	Hazratbal	Srinagar	Srinagar	1,12,541
20	Khanyar	Srinagar	Srinagar	91,226
21	Habba Kadal	Srinagar	Srinagar	95,546
22	Lal Chowk	Srinagar	Srinagar	1,07,199
23	Chanapora	Srinagar	Srinagar	85,431
24	Zadibal	Srinagar	Srinagar	1,12,864
25	Eidgah	Srinagar	Srinagar	61,885
26	Central Shalteng	Srinagar	Srinagar	1,07,770
27	Budgam	Budgam	Baramulla	1,25,394
28	Beerwah	Budgam	Baramulla	98,268
29	Khan Sahib	Budgam	Srinagar	94,016
30	Chrar-i-Sharief	Budgam	Srinagar	1,03,277
31	Chadoora	Budgam	Srinagar	88,659
32	Pampore	Pulwama	Srinagar	1,00,383
33	Tral	Pulwama	Srinagar	98,156
34	Pulwama	Pulwama	Srinagar	99,555
35	Rajpora	Pulwama	Srinagar	1,09,543
36	Zainapora	Shopian	Anantnag–Rajouri	1,08,493
37	Shopian	Shopian	Srinagar	1,00,546
38	D. H. Pora	Kulgam	Anantnag - Rajouri	99,037
39	Kulgam	Kulgam	Anantnag - Rajouri	1,17,322
40	Devsar	Kulgam	Anantnag - Rajouri	1,12,381
41	Dooru	Anantnag	Anantnag - Rajouri	1,16,749
42	Kokernag (ST)	Anantnag	Anantnag - Rajouri	91,280
43	Anantnag West	Anantnag	Anantnag - Rajouri	1,26,006
44	Anantnag	Anantnag	Anantnag - Rajouri	61,070
45	Srigufwara–Bijbehara	Anantnag	Anantnag - Rajouri	1,02,081
46	Shangus–Anantnag East	Anantnag	Anantnag - Rajouri	1,00,902
47	Pahalgam	Anantnag	Anantnag - Rajouri	69,693
Jammu division
48	Inderwal	Kishtawar	Udhampur	64,101
49	Kishtwar	Kishtawar	Udhampur	74,466
50	Padder–Nagseni	Kishtawar	Udhampur	40,732
51	Bhadarwah	Doda	Udhampur	1,24,568
52	Doda	Doda	Udhampur	98,582
53	Doda West	Doda	Udhampur	87,436
54	Ramban	Ramban	Udhampur	98,099
55	Banihal	Ramban	Udhampur	1,26,096
56	Gulabgarh (ST)	Reasi	Jammu	94,684
57	Reasi	Reasi	Jammu	84,877
58	Shri Mata Vaishno Devi	Reasi	Jammu	56,401
59	Udhampur West	Udhampur	Udhampur	1,15,655
60	Udhampur East	Udhampur	Udhampur	1,00,690
61	Chenani	Udhampur	Udhampur	1,09,174
62	Ramnagar (SC)	Udhampur	Udhampur	96,779
63	Bani	Kathua	Udhampur	57,999
64	Billawar	Kathua	Udhampur	94,651
65	Basohli	Kathua	Udhampur	69,282
66	Jasrota	Kathua	Udhampur	86,753
67	Kathua (SC)	Kathua	Udhampur	1,08,666
68	Hiranagar	Kathua	Udhampur	87,939
69	Ramgarh (SC)	Samba	Jammu	88,597
70	Samba	Samba	Jammu	91,080
71	Vijaypur	Samba	Jammu	80,536
72	Bishnah (SC)	Jammu	Jammu	1,19,782
73	Suchetgarh (SC)	Jammu	Jammu	1,12,819
74	R. S. Pura–Jammu South	Jammu	Jammu	1,29,092
75	Bahu	Jammu	Jammu	1,20,693
76	Jammu East	Jammu	Jammu	1,06,877
77	Nagrota	Jammu	Jammu	95,573
78	Jammu West	Jammu	Jammu	1,05,852
79	Jammu North	Jammu	Jammu	1,11,228
80	Marh (SC)	Jammu	Jammu	93,300
81	Akhnoor (SC)	Jammu	Jammu	95,265
82	Chhamb	Jammu	Jammu	1,05,672
83	Kalakote–Sunderbani	Rajouri	Jammu	97,541
84	Nowshera	Rajouri	Anantnag - Rajouri	86,506
85	Rajouri (ST)	Rajouri	Anantnag - Rajouri	89,102
86	Budhal (ST)	Rajouri	Anantnag - Rajouri	95,072
87	Thannamandi (ST)	Rajouri	Anantnag - Rajouri	1,22,370
88	Surankote (ST)	Poonch	Anantnag - Rajouri	1,13,342
89	Poonch Haveli	Poonch	Anantnag - Rajouri	1,28,807
90	Mendhar (ST)	Poonch	Anantnag - Rajouri	1,09,474
91–114	Reserved for Pakistan-administered Kashmir			

== See also ==
- Elections in Jammu and Kashmir
- 2024 Jammu and Kashmir Legislative Assembly election
- List of parliamentary constituencies in Jammu and Kashmir
