= Iftkar Ahmed =

Indian politician

Member of Jammu and Kashmir Legislative Assembly
- Incumbent
- Assumed office 8 October 2024
- Preceded by: Qamar Hussain
- Constituency: Rajouri

Personal details
- Party: Indian National Congress
- Profession: Politician

Iftkar Ahmed is an Indian politician from Jammu & Kashmir. He is a Member of the Jammu & Kashmir Legislative Assembly from 2024, representing Rajouri Assembly constituency and holding office of General Secretary Jammu and Kashmir Pradesh Congress Committee of the Indian National Congress party.

== Electoral performance ==
| Election | Constituency | Party | Result | Votes % | Opposition Candidate | Opposition Party | Opposition vote % | Ref |
|---|---|---|---|---|---|---|---|---|
| 2024 | Rajouri | INC | Won | 45.04% | Vibod Kumar | BJP | 42.85% | |

== See also ==
- 2024 Jammu & Kashmir Legislative Assembly election
- Jammu and Kashmir Legislative Assembly
