= Choudhary Mohammad Akram =

Indian politician (born 1962)

Choudhary Mohammad Akram (born 1962) is an Indian politician from Jammu and Kashmir. He is an MLA from Surankote Assembly constituency in Poonch district as National Conference candidate. He won the 2014 Jammu and Kashmir Legislative Assembly election representing the Indian National Congress. He won the 2024 election as an independent candidate.

== Early life and education ==
Akram is from Lassana village, Poonch district, Jammu and Kashmir. He is the son of late Aslam Chowdhary Mohammad Aslam. He completed his B.E. in Civil Engineering in 1991 at R.E.C. Srinagar.

== Career ==
Akram won from Surankote Assembly constituency representing Indian National Congress in the 2014 Jammu and Kashmir Legislative Assembly election. He polled 30,584 votes and defeated his nearest rival, Mushtaq Ahmed Shah of Jammu and Kashmir National Conference, by a margin of 8,064 votes. In the 2024 Jammu and Kashmir Legislative Assembly election he polled 34,201 votes as an independent candidate and defeated his nearest rival, Mohammad Shahnawaz of the Indian National Congress, by a margin of 8,551 votes.

== Electoral performance ==
Election	Constituency	Party	Result	Votes %	Opposition Candidate	Opposition Party	Opposition vote %	Ref
2024	Surankote	Independent	Won	39.37%	Mohammed Shahnawaz	INC	29.18%	
2014	Surankote	INC	Won	46.45%	Mushtaq Ahmed Shah	JKNC	34.20%	
