= Mushtaq Bukhari =

Indian politician

Member of the Jammu and Kashmir Legislative Assembly
- In office 1996–2008
- Constituency: Surankote

Vice Chairman of Pahari Advisory Board
- In office 2010–2013

Cabinet Minister for Social Welfare, Government of Jammu and Kashmir

Personal details
- Born: c. 1949
- Died: October 2, 2024 (aged 74–75) Jammu and Kashmir, India
- Party: Bharatiya Janata Party (2024)
- Other political affiliations: Jammu & Kashmir National Conference (until 2022)
- Occupation: Politician

Syed Mushtaq Ahmad Shah Bukhari was an Indian politician from Jammu and Kashmir. He represented the Surankote Assembly constituency in the Jammu and Kashmir Legislative Assembly and served two terms, winning elections in 1996 and 2002.

== Career ==
Mushtaq Bukhari served as a cabinet minister in the state government with the Social Welfare Department portfolio. He was also appointed as the Vice Chairman of the Jammu & Kashmir Advisory Board for the Development of Pahari Speaking People from 2010 to 2013, where he worked on issues related to the Pahari-speaking population. He was affiliated with the Jammu & Kashmir National Conference for nearly four decades. In February 2022, he resigned from the party following differences with the leadership regarding the demand for Scheduled Tribe (ST) status for the Pahari community.

Bukhari was recognised as a religious figure within the Muslim community and was referred to as Peer Sahab. He had influence among the Pahari community, which has a presence in Rajouri, Poonch, Baramulla, and Kupwara districts.

In February 2024, he joined the Bharatiya Janata Party and contested the 2024 Assembly elections from the Surankote constituency, where he lost. He died on 2 October 2024 after a prolonged illness at the age of 75.
