= Javaid Iqbal (politician) =

Indian politician

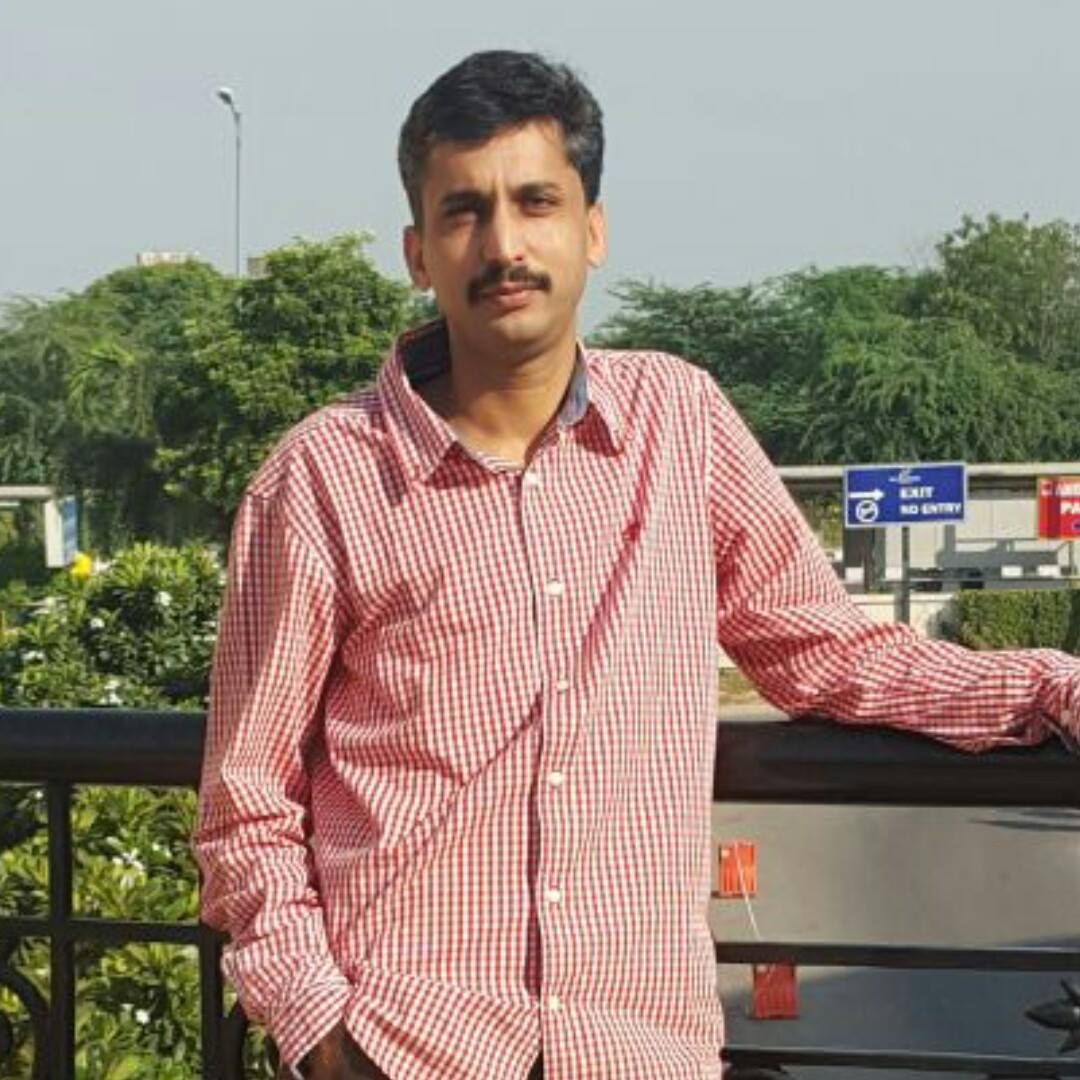

Member of Jammu and Kashmir Legislative Assembly
- Incumbent
- Assumed office 8 October 2024
- Constituency: Budhal

Personal details
- Party: Jammu & Kashmir National Conference
- Profession: Politician

Javaid Iqbal is an Indian politician from Jammu & Kashmir. He is a Member of the Jammu & Kashmir Legislative Assembly from 2024, representing Budhal Assembly constituency as a Member of the Jammu & Kashmir National Conference party.

== Early Life and background ==
Javaid Iqbal Choudhary holds a Bachelor of Science degree from the University of Jammu. He is the nephew of Choudhary Zulfikar Ali, a former minister and two-time MLA, and the brother of Dr. Shahid Iqbal Choudhary, an IAS officer, and Zafar Choudhary, a journalist

== See also ==
- 2024 Jammu & Kashmir Legislative Assembly election
- Jammu and Kashmir Legislative Assembly
