= Rajouri Assembly constituency =

Constituency of the Jammu and Kashmir Legislative Assembly

Coordinates: 33.38°N 74.32°E

Rajouri
- Constituency No. 85 for the Jammu and Kashmir Legislative Assembly

Constituency details
- Country: India
- State: Jammu and Kashmir
- District: Rajouri
- Lok Sabha constituency: Anantnag-Rajouri
- Established: 1962
- Reservation: ST

Member of Legislative Assembly
- Incumbent Iftkar Ahmed
- Party: Indian National Congress
- Elected year: 2024

Rajouri Assembly constituency is one of the 90 constituencies in the Legislative Assembly of Jammu and Kashmir, a northern Union Territory of India. Rajouri is also part of Anantnag-Rajouri Lok Sabha constituency.

== Members of Legislative Assembly ==
Election	Member	Party
1962	Abdul Aziz Shawal	Jammu and Kashmir National Conference
1967	Abdul Rashid	Jammu and Kashmir National Conference
1972	Chowdhary Talib Hussain	Jammu and Kashmir National Conference
1977	Chowdhary Talib Hussain	Jammu and Kashmir National Conference
1983	Chowdhary Talib Hussain	Jammu and Kashmir National Conference
1987	Mirza Abdul Rashid	Jammu and Kashmir National Conference
1996	Mohammad Sharief Tariq	Jammu and Kashmir National Conference
2002	Mohammad Aslam	Jammu and Kashmir National Conference
2008	Shabbir Ahmed Khan	Indian National Congress
2014	Qamar Hussain	Jammu and Kashmir Peoples Democratic Party
2024	Iftkar Ahmed	Indian National Congress

== Election results ==
=== Assembly Election 2024 ===
2024 Jammu and Kashmir Legislative Assembly election : Rajouri
Party	Candidate	Votes	%	±%
INC	Iftkar Ahmed	28,923	45.04%	▲17.43
BJP	Vibod Kumar	27,519	42.85%	▲15.05
Independent	Mian Mohammed Mehfooz	4,052	6.31%	New
JKAP	Manzoor Hussain Shah	1,766	2.75%	New
JKPDP	Tasadiq Hussain	727	1.13%	▼29.50
NOTA	None of the Above	538	0.84%	▼0.14
Margin of victory		1,404	2.19%	▼0.64
Turnout		64,220	56.88%	▼19.21
Registered electors		1,12,904		▼2.37
INC gain from JKPDP		Swing	▲14.41	

=== Assembly Election 2014 ===
2014 Jammu and Kashmir Legislative Assembly election : Rajouri
Party	Candidate	Votes	%	±%
JKPDP	Qamar Hussain	26,954	30.63%	▲17.46
BJP	Chowdhary Talib Hussain	24,464	27.80%	▲15.94
INC	Shabir Ahmed Khan	24,296	27.61%	▲13.98
JKNC	Mirza Abdul Rashid	4,888	5.56%	▼4.93
Independent	Yog Raj	1,744	1.98%	New
Independent	Mohammed Farooq	1,733	1.97%	New
Independent	Ghulam Mustafa	587	0.67%	New
NOTA	None of the Above	864	0.98%	New
Margin of victory		2,490	2.83%	▲2.38
Turnout		87,992	76.09%	▲5.97
Registered electors		1,15,647		▲10.37
JKPDP gain from INC		Swing	▲17.00	

=== Assembly Election 2008 ===
2008 Jammu and Kashmir Legislative Assembly election : Rajouri
Party	Candidate	Votes	%	±%
INC	Shabir Ahmed Khan	10,013	13.63%	▼17.39
JKPDP	Tasadiq Hussain	9,680	13.18%	New
Independent	Chowdhary Talib Hussain	8,763	11.93%	New
BJP	Vibodh Gupta	8,712	11.86%	▼8.65
JKNC	Mohammed Aslam Khan	7,706	10.49%	▼29.51
Independent	Qamar Hussain	7,035	9.58%	New
Independent	Mohammed Sharief Tariq	5,299	7.21%	New
Margin of victory		333	0.45%	▼8.52
Turnout		73,469	70.12%	▲43.10
Registered electors		1,04,783		▼5.14
INC gain from JKNC		Swing	▼26.37	

=== Assembly Election 2002 ===
2002 Jammu and Kashmir Legislative Assembly election : Rajouri
Party	Candidate	Votes	%	±%
JKNC	Mohammed Aslam	11,933	40.00%	▼10.74
INC	Qamar Hussain	9,255	31.02%	▼4.29
BJP	Yog Raj	6,120	20.51%	▲8.57
Independent	Qamer Robbani	656	2.20%	New
Independent	Mohammed Maroof Khan	419	1.40%	New
Independent	Shafaqat Wani	280	0.94%	New
Independent	Babu Ram Sharma	240	0.80%	New
Margin of victory		2,678	8.98%	▼6.45
Turnout		29,836	27.05%	▼37.64
Registered electors		1,10,458		▲39.69
JKNC hold		Swing	▼10.74	

=== Assembly Election 1996 ===
1996 Jammu and Kashmir Legislative Assembly election : Rajouri
Party	Candidate	Votes	%	±%
JKNC	Mohammed Sharief Tariq	25,934	50.73%	New
INC	Chowdhary Talib Hussain	18,048	35.31%	▼36.71
BJP	Vibod Kumar Gupta	6,103	11.94%	New
JD	Qamer Robbani	580	1.13%	New
JKNPP	Natter Singh	380	0.74%	New
Margin of victory		7,886	15.43%	▼33.66
Turnout		51,120	65.45%	▼16.55
Registered electors		79,073		▲38.27
JKNC gain from INC		Swing	▼21.28	

=== Assembly Election 1987 ===
1987 Jammu and Kashmir Legislative Assembly election : Rajouri
Party	Candidate	Votes	%	±%
INC	Mirsa Abdul Rashid	33,443	72.02%	▲28.27
Independent	Chowdhary Talib Hussain	10,648	22.93%	New
Independent	Ashok Kumar Sharma	1,348	2.90%	New
Independent	Khadam Hussain	349	0.75%	New
Independent	Saire Begum	285	0.61%	New
Margin of victory		22,795	49.09%	▲42.89
Turnout		46,438	82.74%	▲11.93
Registered electors		57,187		▲11.89
INC gain from JKNC		Swing	▲22.07	

=== Assembly Election 1983 ===
1983 Jammu and Kashmir Legislative Assembly election : Rajouri
Party	Candidate	Votes	%	±%
JKNC	Talib Hussain	17,683	49.95%	▲18.59
INC	Mirza Abdul Rashid	15,488	43.75%	▲3.77
JKNC	Nazir Ahmed Mir	1,145	3.23%	▼28.12
BJP	Roop Lal	883	2.49%	New
Margin of victory		2,195	6.20%	▼2.42
Turnout		35,403	70.64%	▲10.97
Registered electors		51,109		▲26.85
JKNC gain from INC		Swing	▲9.97	

=== Assembly Election 1977 ===
1977 Jammu and Kashmir Legislative Assembly election : Rajouri
Party	Candidate	Votes	%	±%
INC	Talib Hussain	9,390	39.98%	▼45.02
JKNC	Mohammed Sharif	7,365	31.36%	New
Independent	Mohammed Aslam	4,969	21.15%	New
JP	Ghulam Qadir Mir	1,638	6.97%	New
Margin of victory		2,025	8.62%	▼65.36
Turnout		23,489	59.62%	▲5.84
Registered electors		40,291		▲26.86
INC hold		Swing	▼45.02	

=== Assembly Election 1972 ===
1972 Jammu and Kashmir Legislative Assembly election : Rajouri
Party	Candidate	Votes	%	±%
INC	Talid Hussain	14,159	84.99%	▲28.45
ABJS	Roop Lal	1,835	11.02%	▼9.84
Independent	Gulzar Ahmed	457	2.74%	New
Independent	Mohammed Sharif	208	1.25%	New
Margin of victory		12,324	73.98%	▲38.30
Turnout		16,659	53.88%	▼12.23
Registered electors		31,759		▲51.78
INC hold		Swing	▲28.45	

=== Assembly Election 1967 ===
1967 Jammu and Kashmir Legislative Assembly election : Rajouri
Party	Candidate	Votes	%	±%
INC	A. Rashid	7,653	56.54%	New
ABJS	P. Ram	2,823	20.86%	New
JKNC	L. Hussain	2,193	16.20%	▼60.56
Democratic National Conference	Dev Raj	867	6.41%	▼16.84
Margin of victory		4,830	35.68%	▼17.84
Turnout		13,536	67.38%	▼1.83
Registered electors		20,925		▼24.72
INC gain from JKNC		Swing	▼20.22	

=== Assembly Election 1962 ===
1962 Jammu and Kashmir Legislative Assembly election : Rajouri
Party	Candidate	Votes	%	±%
JKNC	Abdul Aziz Shawal	14,192	76.76%	New
Democratic National Conference	Dev Raj	4,297	23.24%	New
Margin of victory		9,895	53.52%	
Turnout		18,489	81.60%	
Registered electors		27,795		
JKNC win (new seat)				

== See also ==
- Rajouri
- List of constituencies of Jammu and Kashmir Legislative Assembly
