= Surankote Assembly constituency =

Constituency of the Jammu and Kashmir legislative assembly in India

Coordinates: 33.64°N 74.26°E

Surankote
- Constituency No. 88 for the Jammu and Kashmir Legislative Assembly

Constituency details
- Country: India
- State: Jammu and Kashmir
- District: Poonch
- Lok Sabha constituency: Anantnag Rajouri
- Established: 1977
- Reservation: ST

Member of Legislative Assembly
- Incumbent Choudhary Mohammad Akram
- Party: Independent
- Elected year: 2024

Surankote is one of the 90 constituencies in the Legislative Assembly of Jammu and Kashmir, a northern Union Territory of India. Surankote is also part of Anantnag-Rajouri Lok Sabha constituency.

== Members of Legislative Assembly ==
Election	Member	Party
1977	Aslam Chowdhary Mohammad	Indian National Congress
1983	Aslam Chowdhary Mohammad	Indian National Congress
1987	Aslam Chowdhary Mohammad	Indian National Congress
1996	Syed Mushtaq Ahmed Bukhari	Jammu and Kashmir National Conference
2002	Syed Mushtaq Ahmed Bukhari	Jammu and Kashmir National Conference
2008	Aslam Chowdhary Mohammad	Indian National Congress
2014	Choudhary Mohammad Akram	Indian National Congress
2024	Choudhary Mohammad Akram	Congress party

== Election results ==
=== Assembly Election 2024 ===
2024 Jammu and Kashmir Legislative Assembly election : Surankote
Party	Candidate	Votes	%	±%
Independent	Choudhary Mohammad Akram	34,201	39.37	New
INC	Mohammed Shahnawaz	25,350	29.18	▼17.27
BJP	Mushtaq Ahmed Shah Bukhari	23,773	27.37	▲24.14
JKPDP	Javaid Iqbal	1,325	1.53	▼11.06
Independent	Qazi Mohammed Irshad	689	0.79	New
NOTA	None of the Above	378	0.44	▼0.13
Margin of victory		8,851	10.19	▼2.06
Turnout		86,871	76.65	▲0.16
Registered electors		1,13,342		▲31.66
Independent gain from INC		Swing	▼7.08	

=== Assembly Election 2014 ===
2014 Jammu and Kashmir Legislative Assembly election : Surankote
Party	Candidate	Votes	%	±%
INC	Choudhary Mohammad Akram	30,584	46.45	▲2.23
JKNC	Mushtaq Ahmed Shah Bhukari	22,520	34.20	▼6.79
JKPDP	Iqbal Hussain Shah	8,290	12.59	▲2.23
BJP	Mohammed Taj Khan	2,123	3.22	New
JKNPP	Ashfaq Rana	429	0.65	New
NOTA	None of the Above	375	0.57	New
Margin of victory		8,064	12.25	▲9.02
Turnout		65,845	76.49	▲1.57
Registered electors		86,084		▲1.48
INC hold		Swing	▲2.23	

=== Assembly Election 2008 ===
2008 Jammu and Kashmir Legislative Assembly election : Surankote
Party	Candidate	Votes	%	±%
INC	Aslam Chowdhary Mohammad	28,102	44.22	▲4.31
JKNC	Mushtaq Ahmed Shah Bukhari	26,051	40.99	▼4.85
JKPDP	Mumtaz Hussain Shah	6,585	10.36	▲9.11
JD(S)	Manzoor Ahmed	737	1.16	New
Independent	Mohammed Sadiq Qureshi	518	0.82	New
BSP	Mohammed Shareef Shad	409	0.64	New
Margin of victory		2,051	3.23	▼2.70
Turnout		63,553	74.92	▲34.91
Registered electors		84,829		▲2.06
INC gain from JKNC		Swing	▼1.62	

=== Assembly Election 2002 ===
2002 Jammu and Kashmir Legislative Assembly election : Surankote
Party	Candidate	Votes	%	±%
JKNC	Mushtaq Ahmad Shah	15,243	45.84	▼11.95
INC	Mohammed Aslam	13,271	39.91	▲0.20
Independent	Abdul Hamid Manhas	3,172	9.54	New
Independent	Mohammed Abdullah	931	2.80	New
JKPDP	Aftab Hussain Shah	416	1.25	New
BJP	Abdul Aziz	221	0.66	▼0.18
Margin of victory		1,972	5.93	▼12.15
Turnout		33,254	40.01	▼33.48
Registered electors		83,113		▲29.40
JKNC hold		Swing	▼11.95	

=== Assembly Election 1996 ===
1996 Jammu and Kashmir Legislative Assembly election : Surankote
Party	Candidate	Votes	%	±%
JKNC	Mushtaq Ahmed Shah	27,275	57.78	New
INC	Aslam Chowdhary Mohammad	18,743	39.71	▼29.10
BJP	Mohammed Aslam	398	0.84	New
JD	Mohammed Sharief Tariq	395	0.84	New
Independent	Mohammed Sharief Shad	390	0.83	New
Margin of victory		8,532	18.08	▼20.29
Turnout		47,201	74.26	▼6.25
Registered electors		64,230		▲33.53
JKNC gain from INC		Swing	▼11.03	

=== Assembly Election 1987 ===
1987 Jammu and Kashmir Legislative Assembly election : Surankote
Party	Candidate	Votes	%	±%
INC	Aslam Chowdhary Mohammad	26,394	68.81	▲20.54
Independent	Mohammed Ayub Shabnam	11,677	30.44	New
Independent	Kalu Khan	285	0.74	New
Margin of victory		14,717	38.37	▲31.95
Turnout		38,356	80.35	▲9.49
Registered electors		48,100		▲15.27
INC hold		Swing		

=== Assembly Election 1983 ===
1983 Jammu and Kashmir Legislative Assembly election : Surankote
Party	Candidate	Votes	%	±%
INC	Aslam Chowdhary Mohammad	14,150	48.27	▼4.09
JKNC	Mohammed Sayeed Beig	12,268	41.85	▼0.31
Independent	Mohammed Ayub Shabnam	2,895	9.88	New
Margin of victory		1,882	6.42	▼3.78
Turnout		29,313	71.24	▲2.59
Registered electors		41,728		▲27.36
INC hold		Swing		

=== Assembly Election 1977 ===
1977 Jammu and Kashmir Legislative Assembly election : Surankote
Party	Candidate	Votes	%	±%
INC	Aslam Chowdhary Mohammad	11,608	52.37	New
JKNC	Mohammed Syed Beg	9,346	42.16	New
JP	Mushtaq Ahmed Shah	922	4.16	New
Independent	Mohammed Ayub	153	0.69	New
Independent	Nazir Ahmed	138	0.62	New
Margin of victory		2,262	10.20	
Turnout		22,167	68.84	
Registered electors		32,764		
INC win (new seat)				

== See also ==
- Surankote
- List of constituencies of Jammu and Kashmir Legislative Assembly
