= Budhal Assembly constituency =

Constituency of the Jammu and Kashmir legislative assembly in India

Budhal
- Constituency No. 84 for the Jammu and Kashmir Legislative Assembly

Constituency details
- Country: India
- State: Jammu and Kashmir
- District: Rajouri
- Lok Sabha constituency: Anantnag-Rajouri
- Established: 2022
- Total electors: 95,072
- Reservation: ST

Member of Legislative Assembly
- Incumbent Javaid Iqbal
- Party: JKNC
- Elected year: 2024

Budhal Assembly constituency is an assembly constituency in the Jammu and Kashmir Legislative Assembly.

== Members of Legislative Assembly ==
Year	Member	Party
2024	Javaid Iqbal	Jammu & Kashmir National Conference

== Election results ==
=== Assembly Election 2024 ===
2024 Jammu and Kashmir Legislative Assembly election : Budhal
Party	Candidate	Votes	%	±%
JKNC	Javaid Iqbal	42,043	61.49%	New
BJP	Chowdhary Zulfkar Ali	23,135	33.84%	New
JKPDP	Guftar Ahmed	1,885	2.76%	New
NOTA	None of the Above	814	1.19%	New
BSP	Abdul Rashid	497	0.73%	New
Margin of victory		18,908	27.65%	
Turnout		68,374	71.92%	
Registered electors		95,072		
JKNC win (new seat)				

== See also ==
- List of constituencies of the Jammu and Kashmir Legislative Assembly
