= INC =

INC may refer to:

== Organizations ==
- Indian National Congress, one of the two main political parties in India
- Indian Nursing Council
- Iglesia ni Cristo, an indigenous Christian religious organization originating in the Philippines
- Ijaw National Congress, a representative body formed in 1991 of Ijaw-speaking people
- Indian National Council, an organisation founded 1941 in Bangkok
- Insel Air, a former airline based in Curaçao (ICAO code INC)
- International Network of Churches, an Australian network of Pentecostal churches
- International Network of Crackers, a major warez organization during the early 1990s
- International Numismatic Council, an international co-ordinating body for numismatics,
- Iraqi National Congress, an umbrella Iraqi opposition group led by Ahmed Chalabi
- National Institute of Culture of Peru

== Other uses ==
- Interim National Constitution of the Republic of Sudan, 2005
- The (International) Noise Conspiracy, a Swedish rock band
- Yinchuan Hedong Airport, China (IATA code INC)
- INC, an instruction in some assembly languages
- Independent Network Charismatic Christianity

== See also ==
- Inc. (disambiguation)
