= Abdul Majid Padder =

Indian politician (born 1958)

Abdul Majid Padder (born 1958) is an Indian politician from Jammu and Kashmir. He was an MLA from Noorabad Assembly constituency which is now renamed as Damhal Hanjipora Assembly constituency in Kulgam district. He won the 2014 Jammu and Kashmir Legislative Assembly election representing the Jammu and Kashmir People's Democratic Party. Padder contested the 2024 election unsuccessfully as the Jammu and Kashmir Apni Party candidate.

== Early life and education ==
Padder is from Noorabad, Kulgam district, Jammu and Kashmir. He is the son of Gh. Mohd. Padder. He completed his Class 9 at the Government High School in 1977 and later discontinued his studies.

== Career ==
Padder won from Noorabad Assembly constituency representing the Jammu and Kashmir People's Democratic Party in the 2014 Jammu and Kashmir Legislative Assembly election. He polled 29,698 votes and defeated his nearest rival, Sakina Itoo of the Jammu and Kashmir National Conference, by a margin of 3,708 votes.
