= Mohammad Amin Bhat =

Indian politician (born 1966)

Mohammad Amin Bhat (born 1966) is an Indian politician from Jammu and Kashmir. He is a former MLA from Devsar Assembly constituency in Kulgam district. He won the 2014 Jammu and Kashmir Legislative Assembly election representing the Indian National Congress.

== Early life and education ==
Bhat is from Devsar, Kulgam district, Jammu and Kashmir. He is the son of Abdul Rehman Bhat. He passed Class 10 in 1984.

== Career ==
He lost the Devsar seat on Democratic Azad Party ticket in the 2024 Jammu and Kashmir Legislative Assembly election. Bhat won from Devsar Assembly constituency representing Indian National Congress in the 2014 Jammu and Kashmir Legislative Assembly election. He polled 20,162 votes and defeated his nearest rival, Mohammad Sartaj Madni of the Jammu and Kashmir People's Democratic Party, by a margin of 1,511 votes. He lost the Devsar seat on Congress ticket in the 2008 Jammu and Kashmir Legislative Assembly election.

== Electoral performance ==
| Election | Constituency | Party | Result | Votes % | Opposition Candidate | Opposition Party | Opposition vote % | Ref |
|---|---|---|---|---|---|---|---|---|
| 2024 | Devsar, Jammu and Kashmir | DPAP | Lost | 10.66% | Peerzada Feroze Ahamad | JKNC | 27.91% | |
| 2014 | Devsar, Jammu and Kashmir | INC | Won | 35.08% | Mohammed Sartaj Madni | JKPDP | 32.45% | |
| 2008 | Devsar, Jammu and Kashmir | INC | Lost | 10.30% | Mohammed Sartaj Madni | JKPDP | 26.79% | |
