= Poonch Haveli Assembly constituency =

Constituency of the Jammu and Kashmir Legislative Assembly

Coordinates: 33.767°N 74.099°E

Poonch Haveli
- Constituency No. 89 for the Jammu and Kashmir Legislative Assembly

Constituency details
- Country: India
- State: Jammu and Kashmir
- District: Poonch
- Lok Sabha constituency: Anantnag – Rajouri
- Established: 1962

Member of Legislative Assembly
- Incumbent Ajaz Ahmed Jan
- Party: JKNC
- Elected year: 2024

Poonch Haveli Assembly constituency is one of the 90 constituencies in the Legislative Assembly of Jammu and Kashmir, a northern Union Territory of India. Poonch Haveli is also part of Anantnag-Rajouri Lok Sabha constituency.

== Members of the Legislative Assembly ==
Election	Member	Party
1962	Ghulam Mohammad Mir	Jammu & Kashmir National Conference
1967	Ghulam Mohammad Mir	Indian National Congress
1972	Ghulam Mohammad Mir	Indian National Congress
1996	Ghulam Mohammed Jan	Jammu & Kashmir National Conference
2002	Ghulam Mohammed Jan	Jammu & Kashmir National Conference
2007 By-election	Jahangir Hussain Mir	Indian National Congress
2008	Ajaz Ahmed Jan	Jammu & Kashmir National Conference
2014	Shah Mohammad Tantray	Jammu and Kashmir People's Democratic Party
2024	Ajaz Ahmed Jan	Jammu and Kashmir National Conference

== Election results ==
=== Assembly Election 2024 ===
2024 Jammu and Kashmir Legislative Assembly election : Poonch Haveli
Party	Candidate	Votes	%	±%
JKNC	Ajaz Ahmed Jan	41,807	42.72	New
BJP	Choudhary Abdul Ghani	20,928	21.39	▲6.57
JKAP	Shah Mohammad Tantray	9,090	9.29	New
Independent	Masood Ahmed	9,017	9.21	New
JKPDP	Shamim Ahmed	8,631	8.82	▼16.75
Independent	Udesh Paul Sharma	5,731	5.86	New
JKPC	Rydham Preet Singh Sudan	1,010	1.03	New
NOTA	None of the Above	847	0.87	▼0.00
Margin of victory		20,879	21.34	▲16.73
Turnout		97,855	75.97	▼0.28
Registered electors		1,28,807		▲28.86
JKNC gain from JKPDP		Swing	▲17.15	

=== Assembly Election 2014 ===
2014 Jammu and Kashmir Legislative Assembly election : Poonch Haveli
Party	Candidate	Votes	%	±%
JKPDP	Shah Mohammad Tantray	19,488	25.57	▲8.84
JKNC	Ajaz Ahmed Jan	15,976	20.96	▼18.66
Independent	Chaudhary Abdul Ghani	15,110	19.83	New
BJP	Pardeep Sharma	11,292	14.82	▲5.04
INC	Chaudhary Bashir Ahmed Naaz	10,289	13.50	▼12.21
Jammu & Kashmir Pir Panjal Awami Party	Mohammed Younis	1,351	1.77	New
Independent	Mohammed Kabir Qureshi	682	0.89	New
NOTA	None of the Above	661	0.87	New
Margin of victory		3,512	4.61	▼9.30
Turnout		76,215	76.25	▲1.88
Registered electors		99,958		▲4.09
JKPDP gain from JKNC		Swing	▼14.05	

=== Assembly Election 2008 ===
2008 Jammu and Kashmir Legislative Assembly election : Poonch Haveli
Party	Candidate	Votes	%	±%
JKNC	Ajaz Ahmed Jan	28,297	39.62	New
INC	Chaudhary Bashir Ahmed Naaz	18,364	25.71	▼5.42
JKPDP	Imtiaz Ali Bandey	11,950	16.73	New
BJP	Pardeep Sharma	6,980	9.77	▲6.83
SP	Mohammed Younis	1,448	2.03	New
Independent	Gursagar Singh	897	1.26	New
BSP	Ashfaq Ahmed	694	0.97	New
Margin of victory		9,933	13.91	▲7.29
Turnout		71,415	74.37	▲5.86
Registered electors		96,028		▼1.03
JKNC gain from INC		Swing	▲8.49	

=== Assembly By-election 2007 ===
2007 Jammu and Kashmir Legislative Assembly by-election : Poonch Haveli
Party	Candidate	Votes	%	±%
INC	Jahangir Hussain Mir	20,697	31.14	▼15.16
Independent	Yash Paul Sharma	16,299	24.52	New
JKNC	Ajaz Ahmed Jan	16,227	24.41	New
Independent	Shah Mohammad Tantray	7,935	11.94	New
BJP	Pardeep Sharma	1,957	2.94	▲1.83
Independent	Sayed Nisar Hussain	1,927	2.90	New
Independent	Iftikhar Ahmed Bazoni	912	1.37	New
Margin of victory		4,398	6.62	▲5.50
Turnout		66,468	68.51	▲7.78
Registered electors		97,024		▲2.10
INC gain from JKNC		Swing	▼16.28	

=== Assembly Election 2002 ===
2002 Jammu and Kashmir Legislative Assembly election : Poonch Haveli
Party	Candidate	Votes	%	±%
JKNC	Ghulam Mohammed Jan	27,364	47.41	▲13.60
INC	Yeshpal Sharma	26,718	46.30	▲38.01
JKNPP	Chaman Lal	1,176	2.04	New
Independent	Mohammed Mushtaq	1,020	1.77	New
JKPDP	Lal Hussain Mushtaq	793	1.37	New
BJP	Dr. Mohammed Sharif Qasmi	641	1.11	New
Margin of victory		646	1.12	▼10.25
Turnout		57,712	60.73	▼4.89
Registered electors		95,028		▲30.56
JKNC hold		Swing	▲13.60	

=== Assembly Election 1996 ===
1996 Jammu and Kashmir Legislative Assembly election : Poonch Haveli
Party	Candidate	Votes	%	±%
JKNC	Ghulam Mohammed Jan	16,150	33.81	New
JD	Yeshpal Sharma	10,722	22.45	New
Independent	Choudhery Bashir Ahmad	10,547	22.08	New
INC	Ghulam Mohammed Mir	3,959	8.29	▼54.99
Independent	Ghulam Mohammed Ganai	2,642	5.53	New
Independent	Khem Raj	1,007	2.11	New
Independent	Sana-Ullah	932	1.95	New
Margin of victory		5,428	11.36	▼33.49
Turnout		47,763	66.94	▲19.89
Registered electors		72,786		▲96.73
JKNC gain from INC		Swing	▼29.47	

=== Assembly Election 1972 ===
1972 Jammu and Kashmir Legislative Assembly election : Poonch Haveli
Party	Candidate	Votes	%	±%
INC	Ghulam Mohammad Mir	10,706	63.28	▼11.66
Independent	Ghulam Ahmed	3,117	18.42	New
Independent	Mohan Singh	1,916	11.32	New
Independent	Lal Hussain Mushtaq	933	5.51	New
ABJS	Shiv Rattan Nath	247	1.46	▼20.09
Margin of victory		7,589	44.85	▼8.53
Turnout		16,919	46.59	▲0.53
Registered electors		36,997		▲14.60
INC hold		Swing	▼11.66	

=== Assembly Election 1967 ===
1967 Jammu and Kashmir Legislative Assembly election : Poonch Haveli
Party	Candidate	Votes	%	±%
INC	Ghulam Mohammad Mir	10,935	74.94	New
ABJS	S. R. Nath	3,145	21.55	New
Democratic National Conference	Bhagwan Dass	512	3.51	▲1.98
Margin of victory		7,790	53.39	▲9.57
Turnout		14,592	47.00	▼24.47
Registered electors		32,284		▲5.64
INC gain from JKNC		Swing		

=== Assembly Election 1962 ===
1962 Jammu and Kashmir Legislative Assembly election : Poonch Haveli
Party	Candidate	Votes	%	±%
JKNC	Ghulam Mohammad Mir	15,148	71.14	New
Independent	Ghulam Qadir Bandey	5,819	27.33	New
Democratic National Conference	Bhagwan Dass	325	1.53	New
Margin of victory		9,329	43.81	
Turnout		21,292	71.34	
Registered electors		30,561		
JKNC win (new seat)				

== See also ==
- List of constituencies of Jammu and Kashmir Legislative Assembly
