= Jahangir Hussain Mir =

Indian politician

Deputy Chairman Jammu and Kashmir Legislative Council
- In office 12 April 2015 – 19 April 2017

Member of Legislative Assembly for Poonch Haveli
- In office 2007–2008
- Preceded by: Ghulam Mohammad Jan
- Succeeded by: Ajas Ahmed Jan

Personal details
- Party: Indian National Congress

Jahangir Hussain Mir is an Indian politician from the Indian National Congress, in the state of Jammu and Kashmir. He was the Deputy Chairman of Jammu and Kashmir Legislative Council from 2015 to 2017. He won a by-election in the Poonch Haveli Assembly constituency of Jammu and Kashmir Legislative Assembly in 2007.

He is currently serving as the President of Jammu and Kashmir Congress Minority Department.
