= Ghulam Ahmad Mir =

Indian politician

AICC in-charge of Tamil Nadu CC and Puducherry PCC
- Incumbent
- Assumed office 8 July 2026
- Preceded by: Girish Chodankar

Member of Jammu and Kashmir Legislative Assembly
- Incumbent
- Assumed office 8 October 2024
- Preceded by: Syed Farooq Ahmad Andrabi
- Constituency: Dooru
- In office 2002–2014
- Preceded by: Ghulam Hassan Wani
- Succeeded by: Syed Farooq Ahmad Andrabi
- Constituency: Dooru

AICC Incharge of West Bengal Pradesh Congress Committee
- In office 14 Feb 2025 – 8 July 2026
- Preceded by: A. Chellakumar
- Succeeded by: Prakash Joshi

President of Jammu Kashmir Pradesh Congress Committee
- In office 2015–2022
- Preceded by: Saifuddin Soz
- Succeeded by: Vikar Rasool Wani

Personal details
- Born: 15 December 1959 (age 66) Damhal, Anantnag, Jammu and Kashmir, India
- Party: Indian National Congress
- Children: 3
- Parent: Haji Ghulam Hassan Mir (father)
- Profession: Politician, Social Work

Ghulam Ahmed Mir (born 15 December 1959) is an Indian politician who is a member of the Indian National Congress. He has been a Member of the Legislative Assembly from the Dooru Assembly constituency in the Jammu and Kashmir Legislative Assembly since 2024.

== Electoral performance ==
Election	Constituency	Party	Result	Votes %	Opposition Candidate	Opposition Party	Opposition vote %	Ref
2024	Dooru	INC	Won	61.15%	Mohammad Ashraf Malik	JKPDP	20.09%	
2014	Dooru	INC	Lost	37.24%	Syed Farooq Ahmad Andrabi	JKPDP	37.58%	
2008	Dooru	INC	Won	36.19%	Syed Farooq Ahmad Andrabi	JKPDP	22.69%	
2002	Dooru	INC	Won	66.19%	Syed Manzoor Ahmad	JKNC	14.28%	
