= Mendhar Assembly constituency =

Constituency of the Jammu and Kashmir legislative assembly in India

Coordinates: 33.61°N 74.14°E

Mendhar
- Constituency No. 90 for the Jammu and Kashmir Legislative Assembly

Constituency details
- Country: India
- State: Jammu and Kashmir
- District: Poonch
- Lok Sabha constituency: Anantnag-Rajouri
- Established: 1962

Member of Legislative Assembly
- Incumbent Javed Ahmed Rana
- Party: JKNC
- Elected year: 2024

Mendhar Assembly constituency is one of the 90 constituencies in the Legislative Assembly of Jammu and Kashmir, a northern Union Territory of India. Mendhar is also part of Anantnag-Rajouri constituency.

== Members of the Legislative Assembly ==
Election	Member	Party
1962	Pir Jamat Ali Shah	Indian National Congress
1967	Chaudhary Mohammad Aslam	Indian National Congress
1972	Chaudhary Mohammad Aslam	Indian National Congress
1977	Sardar Rafiq Hussain Khan	Independent
1983	Sardar Rafiq Hussain Khan	Jammu & Kashmir National Conference
1987	Nisar Ahamed Khan	Jammu & Kashmir National Conference
1996	Nisar Ahamed Khan	Jammu & Kashmir National Conference
2002	Javed Ahmed Rana	Jammu & Kashmir National Conference
2008	Sardar Rafiq Hussain Khan	Jammu and Kashmir Peoples Democratic Party
2014	Javed Ahmed Rana	Jammu & Kashmir National Conference
2024	Javed Ahmed Rana	Jammu & Kashmir National Conference

== Election results ==
=== Assembly Election 2024 ===
2024 Jammu and Kashmir Legislative Assembly election : Mendhar
Party	Candidate	Votes	%	±%
JKNC	Javed Ahmed Rana	32,176	38.89	New
BJP	Murtaza Ahmed Khan	17,270	20.87	▲18.62
Independent	Mohammed Ashfaq	13,750	16.62	New
Independent	Shazad Ahmed Malik	10,675	12.90	New
JKPDP	Nadeem Ahmed Khan	7,135	8.62	▼25.30
NOTA	None of the Above	490	0.59	▲0.05
Margin of victory		14,906	18.02	▲4.20
Turnout		82,734	75.57	▼4.52
Registered electors		1,09,474		▲34.23
JKNC gain from JKNC		Swing	▼8.85	

=== Assembly Election 2014 ===
2014 Jammu and Kashmir Legislative Assembly election : Mendhar
Party	Candidate	Votes	%	±%
JKNC	Javed Ahmed Rana	31,186	47.75	▲1.33
JKPDP	Mohammed Mahroof Khan	22,161	33.93	▼13.70
INC	Murtaza Ahmed Khan	7,255	11.11	▲8.55
BJP	Zulfqar Hussain Khan	1,472	2.25	New
Independent	Mohammed Sharief Khan	830	1.27	New
Independent	Nisar Ahmed Khan	534	0.82	New
Independent	Nisar Hussain Shah	495	0.76	New
NOTA	None of the Above	351	0.54	New
Margin of victory		9,025	13.82	▲12.60
Turnout		65,317	80.09	▲2.24
Registered electors		81,554		▲4.15
JKNC gain from JKPDP		Swing	▲0.11	

=== Assembly Election 2008 ===
2008 Jammu and Kashmir Legislative Assembly election : Mendhar
Party	Candidate	Votes	%	±%
JKPDP	Sardar Rafiq Hussain Khan	29,036	47.63	New
JKNC	Javed Ahmed Rana	28,294	46.42	▼4.98
INC	Majid Ahmed Khan	1,559	2.56	▼6.45
SP	Mughal Hussain Khan	438	0.72	New
JKANC	Shamim Ahmed	374	0.61	New
Margin of victory		742	1.22	▼15.26
Turnout		60,958	77.85	▲18.06
Registered electors		78,302		▼1.91
JKPDP gain from JKNC		Swing	▼3.76	

=== Assembly Election 2002 ===
2002 Jammu and Kashmir Legislative Assembly election : Mendhar
Party	Candidate	Votes	%	±%
JKNC	Javed Ahmed Rana	24,530	51.39	▲13.93
Independent	Rafiq Hussain Khan	16,665	34.92	New
INC	Mohammed Zaffar-Ullah	4,299	9.01	▼2.08
Independent	Majid Ahmad Khan	1,212	2.54	New
Independent	Mumtaz Ahmad Khan	1,023	2.14	New
Margin of victory		7,865	16.48	▲10.96
Turnout		47,729	60.29	▼7.92
Registered electors		79,826		▲21.15
JKNC hold		Swing	▲13.93	

=== Assembly Election 1996 ===
1996 Jammu and Kashmir Legislative Assembly election : Mendhar
Party	Candidate	Votes	%	±%
JKNC	Nisar Ahmed Khan	16,716	37.47	▼14.99
Independent	Javed Ahmed Rana	14,256	31.95	New
JD	Sardar Rafiq Hussain Khan	5,645	12.65	New
INC	Ch. Lal Mohammed Sabir	4,946	11.09	New
BJP	Ch. Mohammed Sadeeq Naz	2,507	5.62	New
BSP	Mohammed Rashid	401	0.90	New
Margin of victory		2,460	5.51	▼4.47
Turnout		44,613	68.59	▼11.98
Registered electors		65,888		▲38.97
JKNC hold		Swing	▼14.99	

=== Assembly Election 1987 ===
1987 Jammu and Kashmir Legislative Assembly election : Mendhar
Party	Candidate	Votes	%	±%
JKNC	Nisar Ahamed Khan	19,820	52.46	▼2.30
Independent	Lal Mohammed Sabir	16,049	42.48	New
Independent	Sardar Rafiq Hussain	1,442	3.82	New
Independent	Mohammed Rashid	289	0.76	New
Margin of victory		3,771	9.98	▼1.06
Turnout		37,782	80.64	▲3.12
Registered electors		47,412		▲13.95
JKNC hold		Swing	▼2.30	

=== Assembly Election 1983 ===
1983 Jammu and Kashmir Legislative Assembly election : Mendhar
Party	Candidate	Votes	%	±%
JKNC	Ragfiq Hussain Khan	17,445	54.76	▲24.16
INC	Mohammed Sadiq	13,926	43.71	▲14.68
JKNC	Majid Ahmed Khan	489	1.53	▼29.06
Margin of victory		3,519	11.05	▲10.68
Turnout		31,860	77.51	▲12.54
Registered electors		41,607		▲25.81
JKNC gain from Independent		Swing		

=== Assembly Election 1977 ===
1977 Jammu and Kashmir Legislative Assembly election : Mendhar
Party	Candidate	Votes	%	±%
Independent	Rafiq Hissain Khan	6,556	30.96	New
JKNC	Mohammed Sadiq	6,479	30.59	New
INC	Shah Mohammed	6,148	29.03	▼38.44
JP	Majid Ahmed Khan	1,994	9.42	New
Margin of victory		77	0.36	▼34.57
Turnout		21,177	65.23	▼1.45
Registered electors		33,070		▼33.87
Independent gain from INC		Swing	▼36.51	

=== Assembly Election 1972 ===
1972 Jammu and Kashmir Legislative Assembly election : Mendhar
Party	Candidate	Votes	%	±%
INC	Choudhry Mohammed Aslam	22,094	67.47	New
Independent	Mohammed Sayeed Beig	10,654	32.53	New
Margin of victory		11,440	34.93	
Turnout		32,748	66.60	▲65.49
Registered electors		50,008		▲25.16
INC hold		Swing		

=== Assembly Election 1967 ===
1967 Jammu and Kashmir Legislative Assembly election : Mendhar
Party	Candidate	Votes	%	±%
INC	M. Aslam	Unopposed		
Registered electors		39,954		▼9.05
INC gain from JKNC		Swing		

=== Assembly Election 1962 ===
1962 Jammu and Kashmir Legislative Assembly election : Mendhar
Party	Candidate	Votes	%	±%
JKNC	Pir Jamat Ali Shah	Unopposed		
Registered electors		43,930		
JKNC win (new seat)				

== See also ==
- Mendhar
- List of constituencies of Jammu and Kashmir Legislative Assembly
