= Thanamandi Assembly constituency =

Constituency of the Jammu and Kashmir legislative assembly in India

Thannamandi
- Constituency No. 87 for the Jammu and Kashmir Legislative Assembly

Constituency details
- Country: India
- State: Jammu and Kashmir
- District: Rajouri
- Lok Sabha constituency: Anantnag–Rajouri
- Established: 2022
- Reservation: ST

Member of Legislative Assembly
- Incumbent Muzaffar Iqbal Khan
- Party: Independent
- Elected year: 2024

Thannamandi is one of the 90 constituencies in the Jammu and Kashmir Legislative Assembly of Jammu and Kashmir a north state of India. This newly created Thanamandi Assembly constituency is a part of Anantnag–Rajouri parliamentary seat which is also a newly created parliamentary seat. It was created in 2022 and had its first election in 2024, since when it is represented by Muzaffar Iqbal Khan, an Independent politician.

== Members of Legislative Assembly ==
Year	Member	Party
2024	Muzaffar Iqbal Khan	Independent

== Election results ==
=== Assembly Election 2024 ===
2024 Jammu and Kashmir Legislative Assembly election: Thannamandi
Party	Candidate	Votes	%	±%
Independent	Muzaffar Iqbal Khan	32,645	35.72	
BJP	Mohammad Iqbal Malik	26,466	28.96	
JKPDP	Qamar Hussain	21,986	24.06	
INC	Mohammad Shabir Khan	7,508	8.22	
NOTA	None of the Above	1,094	1.20	
Independent	Astkhar Ali Ahmed	1,015	1.11	
JKAP	Irfan Anjum	666	0.73	
Majority		6,179	6.76	
Turnout		91,380	74.68	
Registered electors		1,22,370		
Independent win (new seat)				

== See also ==
- List of constituencies of the Jammu and Kashmir Legislative Assembly
