= Dooru Assembly constituency =

Constituency of the Jammu and Kashmir Legislative Assembly

Coordinates: 34.046°N 74.734°E

Dooru
- Constituency No. 41 for the Jammu and Kashmir Legislative Assembly

Constituency details
- Country: India
- State: Jammu and Kashmir
- District: Anantnag
- Lok Sabha constituency: Anantnag-Rajouri
- Established: 1962

Member of Legislative Assembly
- Incumbent Ghulam Ahmad Mir
- Party: Indian National Congress
- Elected year: 2024

Dooru is one of the 90 constituencies in the Legislative Assembly of Jammu and Kashmir, a northern Union Territory of India. Dooru is also part of Anantnag-Rajouri Lok Sabha constituency.

== Members of the Legislative Assembly ==
Election	Member	Party
1962	[[Syed Mir Qasim]]	Jammu and Kashmir National Conference
1977	Haji Abdul Gani Khan	Jammu and Kashmir National Conference
1983	Mohammad Akbar Ganie	Jammu and Kashmir National Conference
1987	Mohammad Akbar Ganie	Jammu and Kashmir National Conference
1996	Ghulam Hassan Wani	Jammu and Kashmir National Conference
2002	Ghulam Ahmad Mir	Indian National Congress
2008	Ghulam Ahmad Mir	Indian National Congress
2014	Syed Farooq Ahmad Andrabi	Jammu and Kashmir Peoples Democratic Party
2024	Ghulam Ahmad Mir	Indian National Congress

== Election results ==
=== Assembly Election 2024 ===
2024 Jammu and Kashmir Legislative Assembly election : Dooru
Party	Candidate	Votes	%	±%
INC	Ghulam Ahmad Mir	44,270	61.15%	▲23.91
JKPDP	Mohammad Ashraf Malik	14,542	20.09%	▼17.49
DPAP	Mohammed Saleem Paray	2,877	3.97%	New
NOTA	None of the Above	2,662	3.68%	▲1.61
Independent	Hilal Ahmad Malik	2,292	3.17%	New
JKAP	Bashir Ahmad Wani	2,108	2.91%	New
Independent	Mohammed Iqbal Ahangar	1,502	2.07%	New
AAP	Mohsin Shafqat Mir	839	1.16%	New
Independent	Nizamuddin Bhat	839	1.16%	New
Margin of victory		29,728	41.06%	▲40.73
Turnout		72,397	62.01%	▼2.98
Registered electors		1,16,749		▲57.09
INC gain from JKPDP		Swing	▲23.57	

=== Assembly Election 2014 ===
2014 Jammu and Kashmir Legislative Assembly election : Dooru
Party	Candidate	Votes	%	±%
JKPDP	Syed Farooq Ahmad Andrabi	18,150	37.58%	▲14.88
INC	Ghulam Ahmad Mir	17,989	37.24%	▲1.05
JKNC	Farooq Ahmad Ganai	8,251	17.08%	▼0.42
BJP	Gull Mohammad Mir	1,030	2.13%	▲0.58
NOTA	None of the Above	997	2.06%	New
Independent	Syed Shariq Hussain	734	1.52%	New
JKPC	Suhail Malik	500	1.04%	New
Independent	Syed Rasheed Ahmad	329	0.68%	New
Margin of victory		161	0.33%	▼13.16
Turnout		48,303	64.99%	▼4.84
Registered electors		74,321		▲18.34
JKPDP gain from INC		Swing	▲1.39	

=== Assembly Election 2008 ===
2008 Jammu and Kashmir Legislative Assembly election : Dooru
Party	Candidate	Votes	%	±%
INC	Ghulam Ahmad Mir	15,870	36.19%	▼30.00
JKPDP	Syed Farooq Ahmad Andrabi	9,952	22.69%	▲12.55
JKNC	Mohammed Akbar Ganie	7,674	17.50%	▲3.22
Independent	Syed Manzoor Ahmad	2,504	5.71%	New
JKANC	Zafffar-Ullah Khan	1,473	3.36%	New
BSP	Akhter Hussain Gojar	1,198	2.73%	New
CPI(M)	Ghulam Nabi Malik	820	1.87%	New
NCP	Javaid Ahmad Khan	766	1.75%	New
Independent	Abdul Majeed Naik	689	1.57%	New
BJP	Gul Mohammad Mir	679	1.55%	▼0.48
SAP	Farooq Ahmad Wani	352	0.80%	New
Margin of victory		5,918	13.49%	▼38.42
Turnout		43,855	69.83%	▲29.35
Registered electors		62,803		▲16.36
INC hold		Swing	▼30.00	

=== Assembly Election 2002 ===
2002 Jammu and Kashmir Legislative Assembly election : Dooru
Party	Candidate	Votes	%	±%
INC	Ghulam Ahmad Mir	14,461	66.19%	▲42.54
JKNC	Syed Manzoor Ahmad	3,119	14.28%	▼31.77
JKPDP	Syed Farooq Ahmad Andrabi	2,217	10.15%	New
JKNPP	Mushtaq Ahmad Shah	598	2.74%	▼3.33
Independent	Farhat Ahmad	533	2.44%	New
Independent	Mohammed Iqbal Mir	477	2.18%	New
BJP	Mohammed Sardar Khan	443	2.03%	New
Margin of victory		11,342	51.91%	▲29.52
Turnout		21,848	40.48%	▼6.69
Registered electors		53,974		▲16.35
INC gain from JKNC		Swing	▲20.14	

=== Assembly Election 1996 ===
1996 Jammu and Kashmir Legislative Assembly election : Dooru
Party	Candidate	Votes	%	±%
JKNC	Ghulam Hassan Wani	10,076	46.05%	▼3.56
INC	Ghulam Ahmad Mir	5,175	23.65%	New
JD	Qasim Sajad	2,687	12.28%	New
JKNPP	Mohammed Iqbal	1,327	6.06%	New
JKAL	Ghulam Qadir Kulley	1,291	5.90%	New
Independent	Mohammed Abdulla Shiekh	1,185	5.42%	New
AIIC(T)	Akber	141	0.64%	New
Margin of victory		4,901	22.40%	▲17.98
Turnout		21,882	49.49%	▼22.73
Registered electors		46,388		▲16.34
JKNC hold		Swing	▼3.56	

=== Assembly Election 1987 ===
1987 Jammu and Kashmir Legislative Assembly election : Dooru
Party	Candidate	Votes	%	±%
JKNC	Mohammed Akbar Ganie	13,826	49.60%	▼0.91
Independent	Noor Ud Din Shah	12,594	45.18%	New
Independent	Qassim Sajjad	1,018	3.65%	New
Independent	Bashir Ahmad Bhat	273	0.98%	New
Margin of victory		1,232	4.42%	▼13.21
Turnout		27,873	74.94%	▼3.46
Registered electors		39,873		▲14.96
JKNC hold		Swing	▼0.91	

=== Assembly Election 1983 ===
1983 Jammu and Kashmir Legislative Assembly election : Dooru
Party	Candidate	Votes	%	±%
JKNC	Mohammed Akbar Ganie	12,854	50.52%	▼0.92
INC	Sher Ali Boda	8,367	32.88%	▲6.86
JI	Noor Ud Din	2,983	11.72%	▲4.63
Independent	Ghulam Ahmad Bandey	1,241	4.88%	New
Margin of victory		4,487	17.63%	▼7.78
Turnout		25,445	76.27%	▲2.65
Registered electors		34,685		▲16.63
JKNC hold		Swing	▼0.92	

=== Assembly Election 1977 ===
1977 Jammu and Kashmir Legislative Assembly election : Dooru
Party	Candidate	Votes	%	±%
JKNC	Haji Abdul Gani Khan	10,817	51.44%	New
INC	Sneer Aki Boda	5,472	26.02%	New
JP	Abdul Samad Rak	3,248	15.45%	New
JI	Mohammed Ramzan	1,492	7.09%	New
Margin of victory		5,345	25.42%	
Turnout		21,029	74.25%	
Registered electors		29,739		
JKNC win (new seat)				

== See also ==
- Dooru
- List of constituencies of Jammu and Kashmir Legislative Assembly
