= Devsar, Jammu and Kashmir Assembly constituency =

Legislative Assembly constituency in Jammu and Kashmir, India

Coordinates: 33.634°N 75.081°E

Devsar
- Constituency No. 40 for the Jammu and Kashmir Legislative Assembly

Constituency details
- Country: India
- State: Jammu and Kashmir
- District: Kulgam
- Lok Sabha constituency: Anantnag-Rajouri
- Established: 1962

Member of Legislative Assembly
- Incumbent Peerzada Feroze Ahamad
- Party: JKNC
- Elected year: 2024

Devsar Assembly constituency is one of the 90 constituencies in the Legislative Assembly of Jammu and Kashmir, a Union Territory of northern India. Devsar is also part of Anantnag-Rajouri Parliamentary Constituency.

== Members of the Legislative Assembly ==
Election	Member	Party
1962	Abdul Aziz Zargar	Jammu and Kashmir National Conference
1967	Manohar Nath Kaul	Indian National Congress
1972	Ghulam Hassan Parry	Independent
1977	Ghulam Nabi Kochak	Jammu and Kashmir National Conference
1983	Ghulam Ahmad Shah	Jammu and Kashmir National Conference
1987	Peerzada Ghulam Ahmad	Jammu and Kashmir National Conference
1996	Peerzada Ghulam Ahmad	Jammu and Kashmir National Conference
2002	Mohmad Sartaj Madni	Jammu and Kashmir Peoples Democratic Party
2008	Mohmad Sartaj Madni	Jammu and Kashmir Peoples Democratic Party
2014	Mohammad Amin Bhat	Indian National Congress
2024	Peerzada Feroze Ahamad	Jammu and Kashmir National Conference

== Election results ==
=== Assembly Election 2024 ===
2024 Jammu and Kashmir Legislative Assembly election : Devsar
Party	Candidate	Votes	%	±%
JKNC	Peerzada Feroze Ahamad	18,230	27.91%	New
JKPDP	Mohammed Sartaj Madni	17,390	26.63%	▼5.83
DPAP	Mohammad Amin Bhat	6,959	10.66%	New
Independent	Nazir Ahmad Bhat	5,838	8.94%	New
Independent	Suhil Ahmad Bhat	5,506	8.43%	New
INC	Aman Ullah Mantoo	4,746	7.27%	▼27.81
JKAP	Reyaz Ahmad Bhat	2,855	4.37%	New
Independent	Abdul Rouf Naik	1,852	2.84%	New
NOTA	None of the Above	1,410	2.16%	▲0.73
AAP	Sheikh Fida Hussain	524	0.80%	New
Margin of victory		840	1.29%	▼1.34
Turnout		65,310	58.11%	▼6.47
Registered electors		1,12,381		▲26.28
JKNC gain from INC		Swing	▼7.17	

=== Assembly Election 2014 ===
2014 Jammu and Kashmir Legislative Assembly election : Devsar
Party	Candidate	Votes	%	±%
INC	Mohammad Amin Bhat	20,162	35.08%	▲24.78
JKPDP	Mohammed Sartaj Madni	18,651	32.45%	▲5.66
JKNC	Peerzada Ghulam Ahmad	11,585	20.16%	▲0.93
BJP	Fayaz Ahmed Bhat	3,892	6.77%	New
Independent	Mudasir Rashid Mir	933	1.62%	New
NOTA	None of the Above	822	1.43%	New
Independent	Nisar Ahmad Hajam	614	1.07%	New
BSP	Mushtaq Ahmad Bhat	514	0.89%	New
Margin of victory		1,511	2.63%	▼4.93
Turnout		57,472	64.58%	▼3.78
Registered electors		88,991		▲14.97
INC gain from JKPDP		Swing	▲8.29	

=== Assembly Election 2008 ===
2008 Jammu and Kashmir Legislative Assembly election : Devsar
Party	Candidate	Votes	%	±%
JKPDP	Mohammed Sartaj Madni	14,175	26.79%	▼11.73
JKNC	Peerzada Ghulam Ahmad	10,174	19.23%	▼5.12
Independent	Mohammed Rafiq Khan	7,778	14.70%	New
INC	Mohammad Amin Bhat	5,450	10.30%	New
CPI(M)	Mohammed Yaqub Ganai	4,941	9.34%	▼15.82
LJP	Mohammed Rafiq Wani	2,169	4.10%	New
Independent	Mohammed Manzoor Hussain Parray	1,761	3.33%	New
SP	Fayaz Ahmed Bhat	1,268	2.40%	New
SAP	Mohammed Rafiq Bhat	1,093	2.07%	New
JKANC	Abdul Rehman Tantray	991	1.87%	New
Independent	Vijay Kumar Kaul	620	1.17%	New
Margin of victory		4,001	7.56%	▼5.80
Turnout		52,914	68.36%	▲32.80
Registered electors		77,406		▲21.58
JKPDP hold		Swing	▼11.73	

=== Assembly Election 2002 ===
2002 Jammu and Kashmir Legislative Assembly election : Devsar
Party	Candidate	Votes	%	±%
JKPDP	Mohammed Sartaj Madni	8,721	38.52%	New
CPI(M)	Mohammed Yaqub	5,695	25.16%	New
JKNC	Peerzada Ghulam Ahmad	5,513	24.35%	▼10.91
Independent	Ghulam Qadir Kully	1,025	4.53%	New
BJP	Fayaz Ahmed Bhat	946	4.18%	New
Independent	Tribhawan Kishan	440	1.94%	New
NCP	Khalida Mushtaq	299	1.32%	New
Margin of victory		3,026	13.37%	▲5.37
Turnout		22,639	35.56%	▼12.85
Registered electors		63,667		▲24.03
JKPDP gain from JKNC		Swing	▲3.26	

=== Assembly Election 1996 ===
1996 Jammu and Kashmir Legislative Assembly election : Devsar
Party	Candidate	Votes	%	±%
JKNC	Peerzada Ghulam Ahmad	8,763	35.26%	▼15.23
INC	Mohammed Yousuf	6,777	27.27%	New
JKAL	Abdul Hamid Rather	5,507	22.16%	New
JD	Ghulam Nabi Shah	3,803	15.30%	New
Margin of victory		1,986	7.99%	▲0.29
Turnout		24,850	51.56%	▼27.36
Registered electors		51,332		▲14.39
JKNC hold		Swing	▼15.23	

=== Assembly Election 1987 ===
1987 Jammu and Kashmir Legislative Assembly election : Devsar
Party	Candidate	Votes	%	±%
JKNC	Peerzada Ghulam Ahmad	17,169	50.49%	▼3.19
Independent	Hamid Ulla Rangrez	14,550	42.79%	New
Independent	Mahender Singh	1,254	3.69%	New
Independent	Syed Abdul Hamid	519	1.53%	New
Independent	Mohammed Shafi	279	0.82%	New
Independent	Abdul Rehman Tantray	231	0.68%	New
Margin of victory		2,619	7.70%	▼12.26
Turnout		34,002	77.85%	▼2.65
Registered electors		44,873		▲21.61
JKNC hold		Swing	▼3.19	

=== Assembly Election 1983 ===
1983 Jammu and Kashmir Legislative Assembly election : Devsar
Party	Candidate	Votes	%	±%
JKNC	Ghulam Ahmad Shah	15,534	53.68%	▼6.27
INC	Manohar Nath Kaul	9,757	33.72%	▲15.14
Independent	Abdul Rohman	2,680	9.26%	New
Independent	Ghulam Nabi	966	3.34%	New
Margin of victory		5,777	19.96%	▼21.41
Turnout		28,937	81.06%	▲1.18
Registered electors		36,900		▲14.53
JKNC hold		Swing	▼6.27	

=== Assembly Election 1977 ===
1977 Jammu and Kashmir Legislative Assembly election : Devsar
Party	Candidate	Votes	%	±%
JKNC	Ghulam Nabi Kochak	14,921	59.95%	New
INC	Manohar Nath Kaul	4,623	18.58%	▼24.19
JP	Mohammed Yosuf Mantoo	3,286	13.20%	New
JI	Peerazada Mohammedd Amin	2,058	8.27%	▲0.97
Margin of victory		10,298	41.38%	▲34.20
Turnout		24,888	79.38%	▲14.15
Registered electors		32,220		▲7.93
JKNC gain from Independent		Swing	▲10.02	

=== Assembly Election 1972 ===
1972 Jammu and Kashmir Legislative Assembly election : Devsar
Party	Candidate	Votes	%	±%
Independent	Ghulam Hassan Parry	9,406	49.94%	New
INC	Manohar Nath Kaul	8,055	42.76%	New
JI	Mohmad Afzal Malik	1,375	7.30%	New
Margin of victory		1,351	7.17%	
Turnout		18,836	66.78%	▲63.09
Registered electors		29,854		▲8.93
Independent gain from INC		Swing		

=== Assembly Election 1967 ===
1967 Jammu and Kashmir Legislative Assembly election : Devsar
Party	Candidate	Votes	%	±%
INC	Manohar Nath Kaul	Unopposed		
Registered electors		27,407		▲13.05
INC gain from JKNC		Swing		

=== Assembly Election 1962 ===
1962 Jammu and Kashmir Legislative Assembly election : Devsar
Party	Candidate	Votes	%	±%
JKNC	Abdul Aziz Zargar	Unopposed		
Registered electors		24,243		
JKNC win (new seat)				

== See also ==
- Devsar
- List of constituencies of Jammu and Kashmir Legislative Assembly
