= Ajaz Ahmed Jan =

Indian politician

Member of Jammu and Kashmir Legislative Assembly
- Incumbent
- Assumed office 8 October 2024
- Preceded by: Shah Mohammad Tantray
- Constituency: Poonch Haveli

Personal details
- Political party: Jammu & Kashmir National Conference
- Profession: Politician

Ajaz Ahmed Jan is an Indian politician from Jammu & Kashmir. He is a Member of the Jammu & Kashmir Legislative Assembly from 2024, representing Poonch Haveli Assembly constituency as a Member of the Jammu & Kashmir National Conference party.

Ajaz Ahmed Jan was first elected to legislative assembly in 2009 assembly elections. He lost 2014 assembly elections to Shah Mohammad Tantary of JKPDP. His father Ghulam Mohammad Jan had also represented Poonch Haveli constituency twice from 1996 to 2008.

== Electoral performance ==
Election	Constituency	Party	Result	Votes %	Opposition Candidate	Opposition Party	Opposition vote %	Ref
2024	Poonch Haveli	JKNC	Won	42.72%	Choudhary Abdul Ghani	BJP	21.39%	
2014	Poonch Haveli	JKNC	Lost	20.96%	Shah Mohammed Tantray	JKPDP	25.57%	
2008	Poonch Haveli	JKNC	Won	39.62%	Chaudhary Bashir Ahmed Naaz	INC	25.71%	

== See also ==
- 2024 Jammu & Kashmir Legislative Assembly election
- Jammu and Kashmir Legislative Assembly
