= Mian Bashir Ahmed =

Indian politician,Islamic scholar and saint (1923–2021)

Mian Bashir Ahmad Larvi(RA)
- میاں بشیر احمد لارویؒ
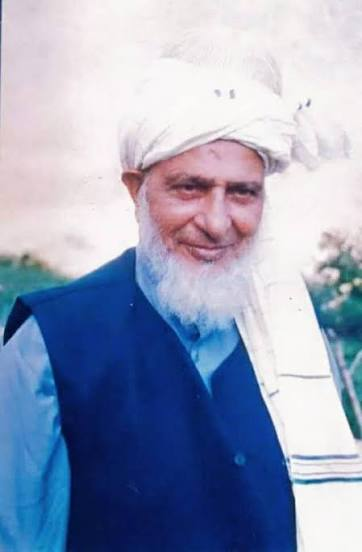
- Born: October 1922; Pahalnar Wangat Ganderbal Jammu and Kashmir, British Raj
- Died: 14 August 2021 (aged 98); Babanagri Wangat Kangan, Jammu and Kashmir, India
- Resting place: Shrine of Babaji Sahib, Kangan, Ganderbal district
- Occupations: Sufi saint, Poet, politicians & tribal leader
- Years active: Mid-20th century – 21st century
- Father: Mian Nizam-u-Din Larvi(RA)
- Writing career
- Pen name: Mīān Bashir
- Language: Urdu; Punjabi; Gujari
- Genres: Love; divine love; Islamic mysticism

Mian Bashir Ahmad Larvi(RA)(Urdu: میاں بشیر احمد لارویؒ, (1922 –2021) commonly known as Baba Sahib, was a Sufi saint, author, politician, and tribal leader from Indian-administrated Kashmir. He was a writer and poet in Gujari, Punjabi and Urdu languages. He was also a Caliph of Islamic Sufi order (Naqshbandi Mujaddidi Larvi).

He was widely respected for his spiritual guidance and his efforts to promote the welfare of the Gujjar and Bakarwal communities in Jammu and Kashmir.

== Early life and family ==
He was born in 21 October 1922 in Pahilnar Wangath, Kangan village in Ganderbal district to Mian Nizam-ud-Din Larvi in a family of Muslim Gujjars.

His native name was "Baba Ji", his father Mian Nizam-ud-Din Larvi (RA) and his grandfather Baba Ji Sahib Larvi (RA) were also religious personalities in Kashmir. They are buried in Wangat, Kashmir.

Mian Bashir has two sons Mian Sarfraz Ahmed and Mian Altaf Ahmed Larvi. Mian Altaf Ahmed has served as Minister of Forestry, Ecology and Environment in Jammu and Kashmir. He had been a Cabinet minister in Jammu and Kashmir. Mian Nizam Ud Din Larvi, Mian Bashir Ahmed larvi and Mian Altaf Ahmed never lost any election since they stepped into politics. Mian Bashir declared his son Mian Altaf Ahmed as Wali E Ahed (Crown Caliph) successor on annual occasion of 8 June 2018, making him heir-designate to the throne.

== Religious views ==
He was a Muslim. He proselytizes the doctrines of Naqshbandiya Mujaddidiya in order to advocate Sufism to his followers through Bayyet. His most renowned follower is Sheikh Al-Mashaikh Faisal ur rehman Usmani Qadri Suhrawardi, Chishti Qalandari Abul Alai Naqshbandi Mujaddidi Madari Shatari Ferdowsi Nizami Sabri Jahangiri Shazli.

== Political career ==
While on a pilgrimage to his ancestral (Sufi) saint's mausoleum in Hazara, Pakistan during the period of General Zia-ul-Haq, he was followed by a large group of people, Pakistani officials. In the wake of his influence in world, high security protocol was given and the Pakistani army was deployed. He was not allowed to go to his mausoleum due to security concerns and this was his reason for quitting politics.

He had been elected four times to the State Legislative Assembly of Jammu and Kashmir. He was closely associated with Sheikh Mohammad Abdullah, Mir Qasim and Bakshi Ghulam Mohammad, he was a minister in their cabinets. He had been closely associated with various top leaders in India including Mrs. Indira Gandhi, Rajiv Gandhi, Sheikh Mohammad Abdullah and Bakshi Ghulam Mohammad.

Mian Bashir Ahmed represented Kashmir issue in the United Nations to argue for peace. He had headed many delegations to international forums.

== Indo-Pakistan Wars ==
During the 1965 and 1971 Indo-Pakistan Wars he worked for peace and prosperity of the State and helped rehabilitate people in the tribal and border belts of Jammu and Kashmir. During the course of the ongoing insurgency since 1989 he worked to eradicate misconceptions between various communities.

== Awards ==
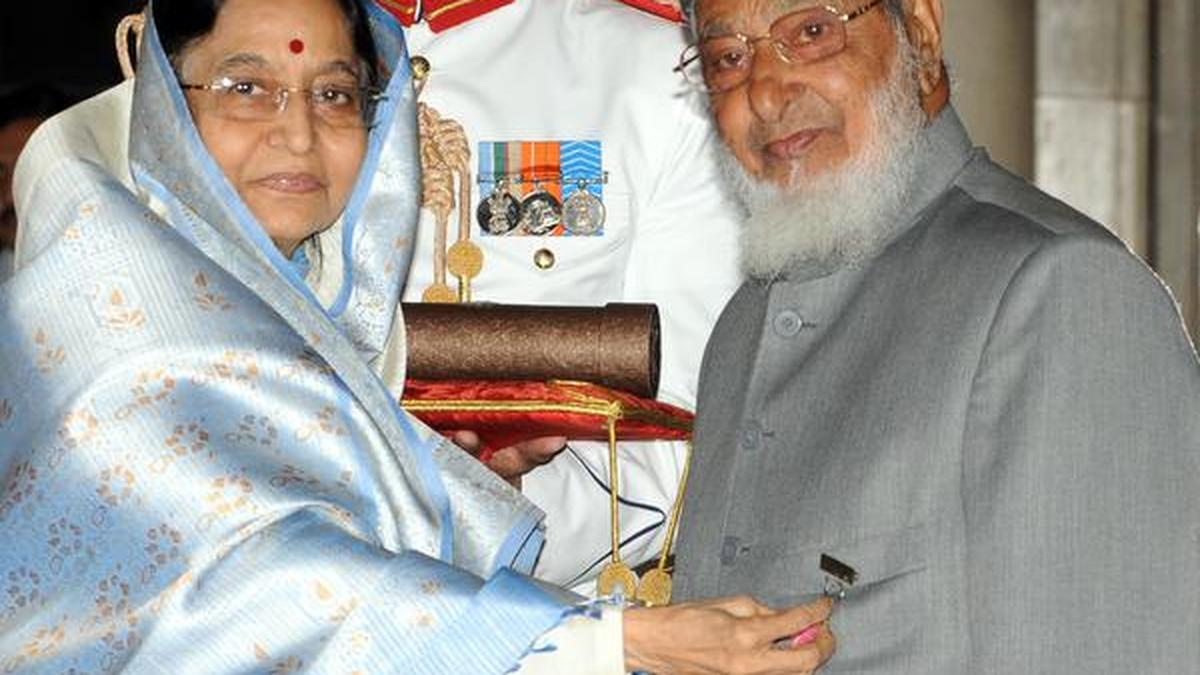
Baba Ji receiving Padma Bhushan from the President of India.

He was awarded the Padma Bhushan (the third highest civilian award), by the government of India on 26 January 2008 for his contribution to the society.

== Death ==
He died on 14 August 2021 (Babanagri Wangat) at the age of 98.

== Poetic works ==
Mian Bashir Larvi(RA) is best known for:

- Israr-e-Kabeeri
- Ashar-e-Nizami
- Siharfian
- Neer Sumandar Maaraf-ul-Tabarqat
- Babaji Diyan Siharfian
- Neer Sumandar (six volumes)
- Mata-e-Faqar-O-Danish
- Maraaf-ul-Tabarqat
- یاد رفتگان

== See also ==
- Jammu and Kashmir
