= Aslam Chowdhary Mohammad =

Indian politician

Chowdhary Mohammad Aslam
- Born: 2 October 1944; Surankote, Poonch, Jammu and Kashmir
- Died: 15 June 2014 (aged 74)
- Occupation: Politician

Choudhary Mohammad Aslam Lassanvi (2 October 1944 - 15 June 2014), born in village Lassana in Surankote, Poonch) was a politician from the Indian National Congress party, a Member of the Parliament of India represented Jammu and Kashmir in the Rajya Sabha, the upper house of the Parliament, with term ending on 29 November 2008.

== Early life and education ==
Choudhary Aslam was born in 1944, lassana village, Surankote in a family of Muslim Gujjars. He did his matriculation from Government High School, Poonch before going to Aligarh Muslim University to study further. The deceased congressman was the son of a prominent Gujjar leader, Chowdhary Ghulam Hussain Lassanvi. His father had formed Gujjar Jat Conference for the welfare of Gujjar community and common people. After partition of India and Pakistan in 1947, family of Aslam crossed over to Pakistan administered Kashmir (PaK) but returned to Poonch in 1951.

== Career ==
Following the footsteps of his father after returning from Aligarh, he joined politics. He fought elections in 1966 from Surankote defeating Syed Jamat Ali Shah, who had won elections unopposed for 13 years from the seat. Aslam joined Congress in 1966 and contested eight elections from Surankote. He was also member of Rajya Sabha. He remained Speaker in the State Assembly for eight years. During his political career of over 48 years, Aslam held important posts including Finance Minister of State, Education Minister, Speaker of Legislative Assembly, Member Parliament in Rajya Sabha, and vice chairman of Gujjar Bakkerwal Advisory Board. He remained J&K Pradesh Congress Committee chief for 17 years.

== Electoral performance ==
Election	Constituency	Party	Result	Votes %	Opposition Candidate	Opposition Party	Opposition vote %	Ref
2008	Surankote	INC	Won	44.22%	Mushtaq Ahmed Shah Bukhari	JKNC	40.99%	
1996	Surankote	INC	Lost	39.71%	Mushtaq Ahmed Shah	JKNC	57.78%	
1987	Surankote	INC	Won	68.81%	Mohammed Ayub Shabnam	Independent	30.44%	
1983	Surankote	INC	Won	48.27%	Mohammed Sayeed Beig	JKNC	41.85%	
1977	Surankote	INC	Won	52.37%	Mohammed Syed Beg	JKNC	42.16%	

== Death and legacy ==
He died on 15 June 2014. Various political parties and social organizations condoled his demise by expressing solidarity with the bereaved family. Offering his condolence to the bereaved family, NC Party President Dr Farooq Abdullah has said that late Aslam's work and contributions towards his community would be remembered with appreciation for a long time to come. NC Working President and J&K chief minister Omar Abdullah also condoled the demise of Aslam by saying that late Aslam was one of the most accomplished Congress leaders in the state and had dedicated his life to the service of the nomadic Gujjar community.

== See also ==
- Politics of India
