= Sakina Itoo =

Indian politician (born 1970)

Cabinet Minister, Government of Jammu and Kashmir
- Incumbent
- Assumed office 16 October 2024
- Lieutenant Governor: Manoj Sinha
- Chief Minister: Omar Abdullah
- Ministry and Departments: Health and Medical Education; Social welfare

Minister for School and Higher Education department
- In office 2024–2026
- Chief Minister: Omar abdullah
- Preceded by: Priya Sethi
- Succeeded by: Shamima Firdous

Minister for Social Welfare and Administrative Reforms, Inspections, Trainings & Public Grievances
- In office 2008–2014
- Governor: Narinder Nath Vohra
- Chief Minister: Omar Abdullah
- Preceded by: Peerzada Mohammad Sayed
- Succeeded by: Sajjad Gani Lone

Minister of State for Education, Government of J&K
- In office 1996–1999
- Governor: Girish Chandra Saxena
- Chief Minister: Omar Abdullah
- Chief Minister: Farooq Abdullah

Minister of State for Tourism and Floriculture, Government of J&K (Independent charge)
- In office 1999–2002
- Governor: Girish Chandra Saxena
- Chief Minister: Farooq Abdullah

Leader of the Opposition in Jammu and Kashmir Legislative Council
- In office 2002–2008
- Chairman: Abdul Rashid Dar; Ghulam Nabi Lone
- Preceded by: Mohammed Muzaffar Parray
- Succeeded by: Nayeem Akter

Member Jammu and Kashmir Legislative Council
- In office 2002–2008
- Governor: Srinivas Kumar Sinha
- Chief Minister: Mufti Sayeed; Ghulam Nabi Azad

Member Jammu and Kashmir Legislative Assembly
- Incumbent
- Assumed office 2024
- Constituency: D.H. Pora
- In office 1996–2002
- Constituency: Noorabad
- In office 2008–2014
- Governor: N.N Vohra
- Chief Minister: Omar Abdullah

Personal details
- Born: 5 December 1970 (age 55) Kulgam, Jammu and Kashmir
- Party: Jammu and Kashmir National Conference
- Parent: Wali Mohammad Itoo (father)
- Education: Intermediate Mbbs dropout

Sakina Masood Itoo (born 5 December 1970) is an Indian politician affiliated to the Jammu & Kashmir National Conference. She is currently the Cabinet minister for Health & Medical Education and Social Welfare in the union territory of Jammu and Kashmir. She has served as cabinet minister of erstwhile state of the Jammu and Kashmir, holding portfolios including Social Welfare, Education, Tourism, Floriculture, Public Works, Public Health Engineering, and ARI Trainings. She was elected to the legislative assembly for the first time in 1996 at the age of 26, and received the "Best MLA Award" in 2012 for her contribution to her constituency.

== Biography ==
Itoo was born to Wali Mohammad Itoo, former revenue minister of Jammu and Kashmir and speaker of Jammu and Kashmir Legislative Assembly, on 5 December 1970 in Kulgam, Jammu and Kashmir. She did her intermediate from the Jammu and Kashmir State Board of School Education in 1991. Later, she started her MBBS practice, professional degree in medicine, but left midway amidst her father's killing in 1994 and subsequently entered politics.

In a 2024 interview with Kashmir Life, Sakina claimed that she had survived around 20 assassination attempts during her political career.

== Career ==
During her political career, Itoo served as a minister in several departments such as deputy minister for Education in 1996, state minister for Social Welfare, and Public Works. Later, she was appointed a minister of Tourism and served the department until 2002. In 2002, she lost an assembly constituency election and was later nominated as a member of Legislative Council by the party in 2004.

During 2014 assembly election campaign, a heavily circulated video clip purportedly showed her compelling an elderly man to swear by religion and vote for her in the upcoming election. The video was reported as a violation of the Model Code of Conduct to the Election Commission of India by the opposition party. Omar Abdullah and the National Conference defended Itoo, stating that the video had been recorded before the Model Code of Conduct came into effect. However, she lost again in 2014 against Abdul Majid Padder of PDP, who later joined the Jammu and Kashmir Apni Party.

In 2024 assembly elections, Sakeena won from the Damhal Hanjipora assembly constituency and defeated Gulzar Ahmad Dar of PDP by a margin of 17,449 votes. On 16 October 2024, she was sworn in as the minister in the second cabinet of Omar Abdullah. On 18 October 2024, following an order issued by lieutenant governor Sinha to allocate portfolios to council of ministers on the advice of chief minister, Sakeena was given the charge of Health and Medical Education, School Education, Higher Education, and Social Welfare.

== Electoral performance ==
Election	Constituency	Party	Result	Votes %	Opposition Candidate	Opposition Party	Opposition vote %	Ref
2024	Damhal Hanji Pora	JKNC	Won	53.45%	Gulzar Ahmad Dar	JKPDP	27.98%	
2014	Noorabad	JKNC	Lost	42.11%	Abdul Majid Padder	JKPDP	48.36%	
2008	Noorabad	JKNC	Won	35.23%	Abdul Aziz Zargar	JKPDP	25.43%	
2002	Noorabad	JKNC	Lost	27.15%	Abdul Aziz Zargar	JKPDP	29.74%	
1996	Noorabad	JKNC	Won	53.12%	Gulzar Dar	JD	32.56%	
