= Muzaffar Iqbal Khan =

Indian politician

Member of Jammu and Kashmir Legislative Assembly
- Incumbent
- Assumed office 8 October 2024
- Constituency: Thanamandi

Personal details
- Profession: Politician

Muzaffar Iqbal Khan is an Indian politician from Jammu & Kashmir. He is a Member of the Jammu & Kashmir Legislative Assembly from 2024, representing Thanamandi Assembly constituency as an independent candidate. He is retired former judge.

== Electoral performance ==
Election	Constituency	Party	Result	Votes %	Opposition Candidate	Opposition Party	Opposition vote %	Ref
2024	Thanamandi	Independent	Won	35.72%	Mohammed Iqbal Malik	BJP	28.96%	

== See also ==
- 2024 Jammu & Kashmir Legislative Assembly election
- Jammu and Kashmir Legislative Assembly
