= Mian Altaf Ahmed Larvi =

Indian politician (born 1957)

- میاں الطاف احمد لاروی
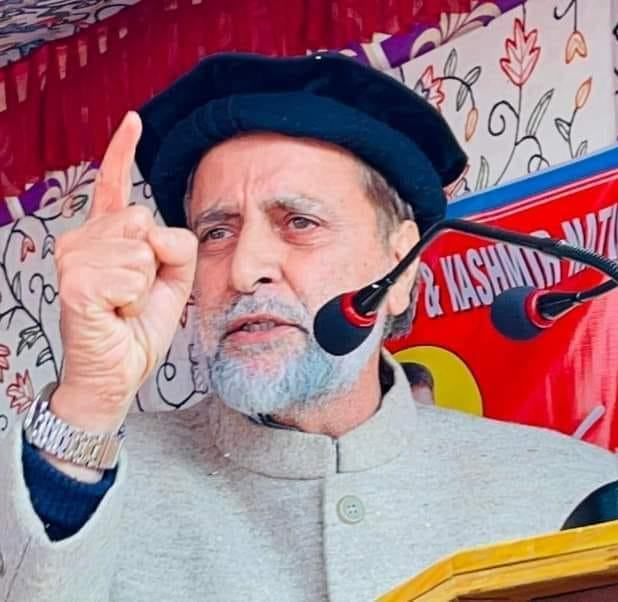

Member of Parliament, Lok Sabha
- Incumbent
- Assumed office 4 June 2024
- Preceded by: Constituency established
- Constituency: Anantnag-Rajouri

Member of the Jammu and Kashmir Legislative Assembly
- In office 1987–2018
- Constituency: Kangan

Cabinet Minister of Social Welfare Department & Health and Medical Education Department
- In office 1996–2002
- Governor: K. V. Krishna Rao; Girish Chandra Saxena

Cabinet Minister of Forestry Department, Ecology & Environment
- In office 2008–2014
- Governor: N. N. Vohra

Personal details
- Born: 1957 (age 68–69) Ganderbal, Jammu and Kashmir, India
- Party: Jammu & Kashmir National Conference
- Other political affiliations: Indian National Congress
- Parent: Mian Bashir Ahmed (father)
- Education: University of Kashmir

Mian Altaf Ahmed Larvi is an Indian politician from Jammu and Kashmir. He is a member of the Lok Sabha from 2024, representing the Anantnag-Rajouri constituency as a member of the Jammu & Kashmir National Conference party. He was a five-time MLA from Kangan, an assembly constituency in Ganderbal district.

He is the younger son of Mian Bashir Ahmed Larvi(RA), a politician and a caliph of the Islamic Sufi order (Naqshbandi Mujaddidi Larvi) in Jammu and Kashmir. Mian Altaf is the grandson of saint Mian Nizam-ud-Din Larvi( RA), the founding president of Gujjar-Jat Conference, a socio-political body established in 1932. Mian Altaf was born in 1957 in Baba Nagri, Wangath, Kangan Ganderbal, Kashmir.

== Personal life ==
=== Family ===
He was born in 1957 in Kashmir. His family had migrated from the Hazaras in the 1800s. His great-grandfather (Hazrat Mian Abdullah Larvi (RA)), known as Baba Ji Sahib Larvi, his grandfather Mian Nizam-ud-Din Larvi (RA), and his father Mian Bashir Ahmed Larvi (RA) were also religious personalities in Kashmir. They are buried in Wangat, Kashmir. Mian Altaf has an elder brother, Mian Sarfraz. Mian Bashir Ahmed declared his younger son, Mian Altaf Ahmad, as successor (Sajjada Nasheen) on the annual occasion of the Urs of Mian Nizam-ud-Din Kiyanvi (RA) of Kaiyyan Sharief on 8 June 2017, making him heir-designate to the throne.

=== Education ===
Mian Altaf is a law graduate from University of Kashmir.

=== Religious views ===
He is a Muslim. He proselytizes the doctrines of Naqshbandiya and Mujaddidiya in order to advocate Sufism to his followers through Bayyet. His family has a following of millions. Hundreds of his followers throng his house at Baba Nagri, Wangath in Kangan every day to meet him and seek his blessings. The most renowned follower of his family is Sheikh Al-Mashaikh Faisal ur Rehman Usmani Qadri Suhrawardi, Chishti Qalandari Abul Alai Naqshbandi Mujaddidi Madari Shatari Ferdowsi Nizami Sabri Jahangiri Shazli.

== Political career ==
He is popular in the Gujjar, Bakarwal and Pahari community. He has been elected five times in the Jammu and Kashmir Legislative Assembly. Mian Altaf's family has a long political standing, with his grandfather Mian Nizam-ud-din Larvi(RA) having remained National Conference MLA from 1952 to 1967. His father Mian Bashir Ahmad Larvi (RA)represented Kangan constituency from 1967 to 1987 and was a minister also. Mian Nizam-ud-Din Larvi(RA), Mian Bashir Ahmed Larvi (RA) and Mian Altaf Ahmed never lost any election since they stepped into politics. Mian Altaf Ahmed has served as Minister of Forestry, Ecology and Environment in Jammu and Kashmir. He has been a Cabinet Minister in Jammu and Kashmir twice. He gave his first term under Chief Minister Farooq Abdullah in 1996 and second term as Cabinet Minister under Chief Minister Omar Abdullah.
