= Javed Ahmed Rana =

Kashmiri politician (born 1963)

Cabinet Minister, Government of Jammu and Kashmir
- Incumbent
- Assumed office 16 October 2024
- Lieutenant Governor: Manoj Sinha
- Chief Minister: Omar Abdullah
- Ministry and Departments: Jal Shakti; Forest; Ecology & Environment and Tribal Affair

Member Jammu and Kashmir Legislative Assembly
- Incumbent
- Assumed office 8 October 2024
- Preceded by: himself
- Constituency: Mendhar
- In office 2014–2019
- Preceded by: Sardar Rafiq Hussain Khan
- In office 2002–2007
- Preceded by: Nisar Ahamed Khan
- Constituency: Mendhar

Personal details
- Party: Jammu and Kashmir National Conference
- Education: University of Jammu (LL.B)
- Profession: Politician

Javed Ahmed Rana (born 1963) is an Indian politician from Jammu and Kashmir. He is a member of Jammu and Kashmir legislative assembly from Mendhar Assembly constituency, which is reserved for Scheduled Tribe community. He is a cabinet minister in the government of Jammu and Kashmir. He is a member of the JKNC political party.

== Early life and education ==
Rana is from Kalaban village, Mendhar tehsil, Poonch district, Jammu and Kashmir. He is the son of Babu Faiz Ahmed and is the younger brother of the prominent former IPS officer and vice chancellor of Baba Ghulam Shah Badshah University Rajouri, Masud Choudhary. He completed his BA and later did LLB in 1989 at the University of Jammu. He is a lawyer and married Hamida Begum Rana, a businesswoman. Together, they have four children: Tahir Javed Rana, Sayema Javed Rana, Zeeshan Javed Rana and Mahpara Javed Rana.

== Career ==
Rana was first elected as an MLA in the 2002 Jammu and Kashmir Legislative Assembly election from Mendhar on JKNC ticket. He won from Mendhar Assembly constituency representing the Jammu and Kashmir National Conference in the 2014 Jammu and Kashmir Legislative Assembly election. He polled 31,186 votes and defeated his nearest rival, Mohd Mahroof Khan of Jammu and Kashmir People's Democratic Party, by a margin of 9,025 votes.

In 2024 Assembly election, he was nominated again by the JKNC to contest from Mendhar and won with a margin of 14,906 votes, defeating Murtaza Ahmed Khan of the Bharatiya Janata Party. On 16 October 2024, he took oath as a cabinet minister in the government of Jammu and Kashmir. On 18 October 2024, following an order issued by Lieutenant Governor Sinha to allocate portfolios to council of ministers on the advice of chief minister, Rana was given the charge of Jal Shakti, Forest, Ecology & Environment, and Tribal Affairs.

== Electoral performance ==
Election	Constituency	Party	Result	Votes %	Opposition Candidate	Opposition Party	Opposition vote %	Ref
2024	Mendhar	JKNC	Won	38.89%	Murtaza Ahmed Khan	BJP	20.87%	
2014	Mendhar	JKNC	Won	47.75%	Mohammed Mahroof Khan	JKPDP	33.93%	
2008	Mendhar	JKNC	Lost	46.42%	Sardar Rafiq Hussain Khan	JKPDP	47.63%	
2002	Mendhar	JKNC	Won	51.39%	Rafiq Hussain Khan	Independent	34.92%	
1996	Mendhar	Independent	Lost	31.95%	Nisar Ahmed Khan	JKNC	37.47%	
