= Wali Mohammad Itoo =

Indian politician (died 1994)

Speaker of Jammu and Kashmir Legislative Assembly
- In office 7 July 1983 – 31 July 1984

Personal details
- Died: 18 March 1994 Jammu, Jammu and Kashmir, India
- Party: Jammu and Kashmir National Conference
- Children: Sakina Itoo

Wali Mohammad Itoo (died 18 March 1994) was a Kashmiri politician, the leader of the Jammu & Kashmir National Conference and the former Speaker of the Jammu and Kashmir Legislative Assembly. He was assassinated in 1994, and his daughter Sakina Itoo followed him into politics after his death.

Itoo, whose father was a landowner in Kashmir, went into politics as a member of the Jammu & Kashmir National Conference, eventually rising to become leader of the party and the state's revenue minister. He was also appointed the speaker of the Jammu and Kashmir legislative assembly on 7 July 1983. In the first month of his tenure, the twenty-three representatives from the opposition Indian National Congress (INC) party felt he was unduly partisan in his actions and began a dharna (peaceful demonstration) against him; Itoo decided to suspend the INC representatives. A year later, after the National Conference had been reduced to a minority after a split, Itoo was removed as speaker on 31 July 1984.

After the Kashmir insurgency began in the late 1980s, Itoo became a target because the National Conference was pro-India. His house in Kashmir was twice grenaded and so he moved his family, consisting of his wife Sitara and five daughters, back to Jammu. Itoo was one of few Conference politicians who were willing to actively work in public despite the threats to their lives: six legislators were assassinated between 1989 and 1992, while militants opened fire on crowds and bombed civilians in early 1994.

On 18 March 1994, he was assassinated in the Talab Khatikan district after exiting a mosque which he had attended for Friday prayers. The assassins, with orders to assassinate all pro-India politicians, walked up to him in the crowded street and shot him at point-blank range. Five men were later arrested. After a condolence meeting was held in Jammu, attended by internal security minister Rajesh Pilot, his body was flown to Awantipora for a burial.

Itoo's brother, who was also involved in politics, was subsequently killed in 2001. Itoo's second daughter Sakina, who was studying to become a doctor at the time of his death, became a politician and minister for the National Conference. She has survived over 20 assassination attempts.
