= Bharatiya Janata Party – Jammu and Kashmir =

Jammu and Kashmir affiliate of the Bharatiya Janata Party

Bharatiya Janata Party – Jammu and Kashmir भारतीय जनता पार्टी, जम्मू कश्मीर
- Abbreviation: BJP
- President: Sat Paul Sharma
- Founder: Atal Bihari Vajpayee; Lal Krishna Advani; Murli Manohar Joshi; Nanaji Deshmukh; K. R. Malkani; Sikandar Bakht; Vijay Kumar Malhotra; Vijaya Raje Scindia; Bhairon Singh Shekhawat; Shanta Kumar; Ram Jethmalani; Jagannathrao Joshi
- Founded: 6 April 1980 (46 years ago)
- Split from: Janata Party
- Preceded by: Bharatiya Jana Sangh (1951–1977); Janata Party (1977–1980)
- Headquarters: Dr. Shyama Prasad Mookherjee Bhawan, Sector - 3 Extension, Trikuta Nagar, Jammu - 180 012 Jammu and Kashmir
- Newspaper: Kamal Sandesh
- Youth wing: Bharatiya Janata Yuva Morcha
- Women's wing: BJP Mahila Morcha
- Labour wing: Bharatiya Mazdoor Sangh
- Peasant's wing: Bharatiya Kisan Sangh
- Ideology: Integral humanism; Social conservatism; Economic nationalism; Hindu nationalism; Cultural nationalism
- International affiliation: International Democrat Union; Asia Pacific Democrat Union
- Colours: Saffron
- Alliance: National Democratic Alliance
- Seats in Rajya Sabha: 1 / 4
- Seats in Lok Sabha: 2 / 5
- Seats in Jammu and Kashmir Legislative Assembly: 29 / 90 (as of 2024)
- Seats in District Development Council: 75 / 280

Election symbol
- Lotus

Party flag

Website
- jkbjp.in

The Bharatiya Janata Party – Jammu and Kashmir (pronounced [bʱaːɾ(ə)ˈtiːjə dʒən(ə)ˈtaː ˈpaːrʈiː]; lit. 'Indian People's Party'), or simply BJP Jammu and Kashmir (BJP), is the unit of the Bharatiya Janata Party of the Union Territory, Jammu and Kashmir. Its head office is situated at Dr. Shyama Prasad Mookherjee Bhawan, Sector - 3 Extension, Trikuta Nagar, Jammu - 180 012, Jammu and Kashmir. The current president of BJP, Jammu and Kashmir is Sat Paul Sharma

== Electoral performance ==
=== Lok Sabha election ===
Year	Seats won	+/-	Outcome
1984	0 / 6	new	Opposition
1989	0 / 6	Steady	Opposition
1991	Election not held because of insurgency until 1996		
1996	1 / 6	▲1	Government, later Opposition
1998	2 / 6	▲1	Government
1999	2 / 6	Steady	Government
2004	0 / 6	▼2	Opposition
2009	0 / 6	Steady	Opposition
2014	3 / 6	▲3	Government
2019	3 / 6	Steady	Government
After Revocation of the special status of Jammu and Kashmir
2024	2 / 5	Steady	Government

=== Rajya Sabha Members ===
Name	Photo	Date of appointment	Date of retirement
Shamsheer Singh Manhas		11/2/2015	10/2/2021
Sat Paul Sharma		24/10/2025	Incumbent

=== Legislative Assembly Election ===
Year	Seats won	+/-	Voteshare (%)	+/- (%)	Outcome
1983	0 / 76	New	3.19%	New	opposition
1987	2 / 76	▲2	5.10%	▲1.91%	opposition
1996	8 / 87	▲6	12.13%	▲7.03%	opposition
2002	1 / 87	▼7	8.57%	▼3.56%	opposition
2008	11 / 87	▲10	12.45%	▲3.88%	opposition
2014	25 / 87	▲14	23.0%	▲10.55%	Coalition Government with PDP
After Revocation of the special status of Jammu and Kashmir
2024	29 / 90	▲4	25.64%	▲2.64%	opposition

=== District Development Council ===
75 / 278

=== Municipal corporation ===
==== Jammu Municipal Corporation ====
43 / 75

==== Srinagar Municipal Corporation ====
4 / 74

== Leadership ==
=== Deputy Chief Ministers ===
No	Portrait	Name	Constituency	Term			Assembly	Chief minister
1		Nirmal Kumar Singh	Billawar	4 April 2016	29 April 2018	2 years, 25 days	12th	Mehbooba Mufti
2		Kavinder Gupta	Gandhinagar	30 April 2018	19 June 2018	50 days	12th	Mehbooba Mufti

=== List of opposition leaders ===
No	Portrait	Name	Constituency	Term			Assembly	Chief Minister
1		Sunil Kumar Sharma	Padder–Nagseni	3 November 2024	Incumbent	1 year, 341 days	13th	Omar Abdullah

=== Elected members ===
==== Incumbent member(s) of Lok Sabha ====
S.No.	Constituency		Portrait	Name	Win Margin in 2024
S.No.	#	Name	Portrait	Name	Win Margin in 2024
01.	4	Udhampur		Jitendra Singh	1,24,373
02.	5	Jammu		Jugal Kishore Sharma	1,35,498

==== Incumbent member of Rajya Sabha ====
S.No.	Portrait	Name	Term start	Term end				
S.No.	Portrait	Name	Term start	Term end	01.	Sat Paul Sharma	25 October 2025	24 October 2031

==== Incumbent member(s) of Legislative Assembly ====
S.No.	Constituency		Name	Remarks	Win Margin in 2024
S.No.	#	Name	Name	Remarks	Win Margin in 2024
Kishtwar District
01.	49	Kishtwar	Shagun Parihar		521
02.	50	Padder–Nagseni	Sunil Kumar Sharma	Leader of Opposition	1,445
Doda District
03.	51	Bhaderwah	Daleep Singh Parihar		10,130
04.	53	Doda West	Shakti Raj Parihar		3,453
Reasi District
05.	57	Reasi	Kuldeep Raj Dubey		18,815
06.	58	Shri Mata Vaishno Devi	Baldev Raj Sharma		1,995
Udhampur District
07.	59	Udhampur West	Pawan Kumar Gupta	Deputy Leader of Opposition	20,752
08.	60	Udhampur East	Ranbir Singh Pathania		2,349
09.	61	Chenani	Balwant Singh Mankotia		15,611
10.	62	Ramnagar	Sunil Bhardwaj		9,306
Kathua District
11.	64	Billawar	Satish Kumar Sharma		21,368
12.	65	Basohli	Darshan Kumar		16,034
13.	66	Jasrota	Rajiv Jasrotia		12,420
14.	67	Kathua	Bharat Bhushan		12,117
15.	68	Hiranagar	Vijay Kumar		8,610
Samba District
16.	69	Ramgarh	Devinder Kumar Manyal		14,202
17.	70	Samba	Surjeet Singh Slathia	Deputy Leader of Opposition	30,309
18.	71	Vijaypur	Chander Prakash Ganga		19,040
Jammu District
19.	72	Bishnah	Rajeev Kumar Bhagat		15,627
20.	73	Suchetgarh	Gharu Ram Bhagat		11,141
21.	74	R. S. Pura–Jammu South	Narinder Singh Raina		1,966
22.	75	Bahu	Vikram Randhawa		11,251
23.	76	Jammu East	Yudhvir Sethi		18,114
24.	77	Nagrota	Devyani Singh Rana		24,647
25.	78	Jammu West	Arvind Gupta		22,127
26.	79	Jammu North	Sham Lal Sharma		27,363
27.	80	Marh	Surinder Kumar Bhagat		23,086
28.	81	Akhnoor	Mohan Lal Bhagat		25,248
Rajouri District
29.	83	Kalakote–Sunderbani	Thakur Randhir Singh		14,409

== List of State Presidents ==
No.	Name	Term start	Term end	Duration	References
1	Thakur Baldev Singh	1980	1989	9 years	
2	Chaman Lal Gupta	1989	1994	5 years	
3	Vaid Vishnu Dutt	1994	1996	2 years	
4	Daya Krishnan Kotwal	1996	2002	6 years	
5	Dr Nirmal Singh	2002	2006	4 years	
6	Ashok Kumar Khajuria	2006	2010	4 years	
7	Shamsheer Singh Manhas	2010	2012	2 years	
8	Jugal Kishore Sharma	2012	2015	3 years	
9	Sat Paul Sharma	2015	2018	3 years	
10	Ravinder Raina	2018	2024	6 years	
(9)	Sat Paul Sharma	2024	Present	Incumbent	

== See also ==
- Bharatiya Jana Sangh
- Organisation of the Bharatiya Janata Party
- Jammu Praja Parishad
