= Udhampur Lok Sabha constituency =

Lok Sabha constituency in Jammu and Kashmir

Coordinates: 32.9°N 75.1°E

Udhampur JK-4
- Lok Sabha constituency
- Interactive Map Outlining Udhampur Lok Sabha constituency

Constituency details
- Country: India
- Region: North India
- Union Territory: Jammu and Kashmir
- Established: 1957
- Total electors: 16,23,195
- Reservation: None

Member of Parliament
- 18th Lok Sabha
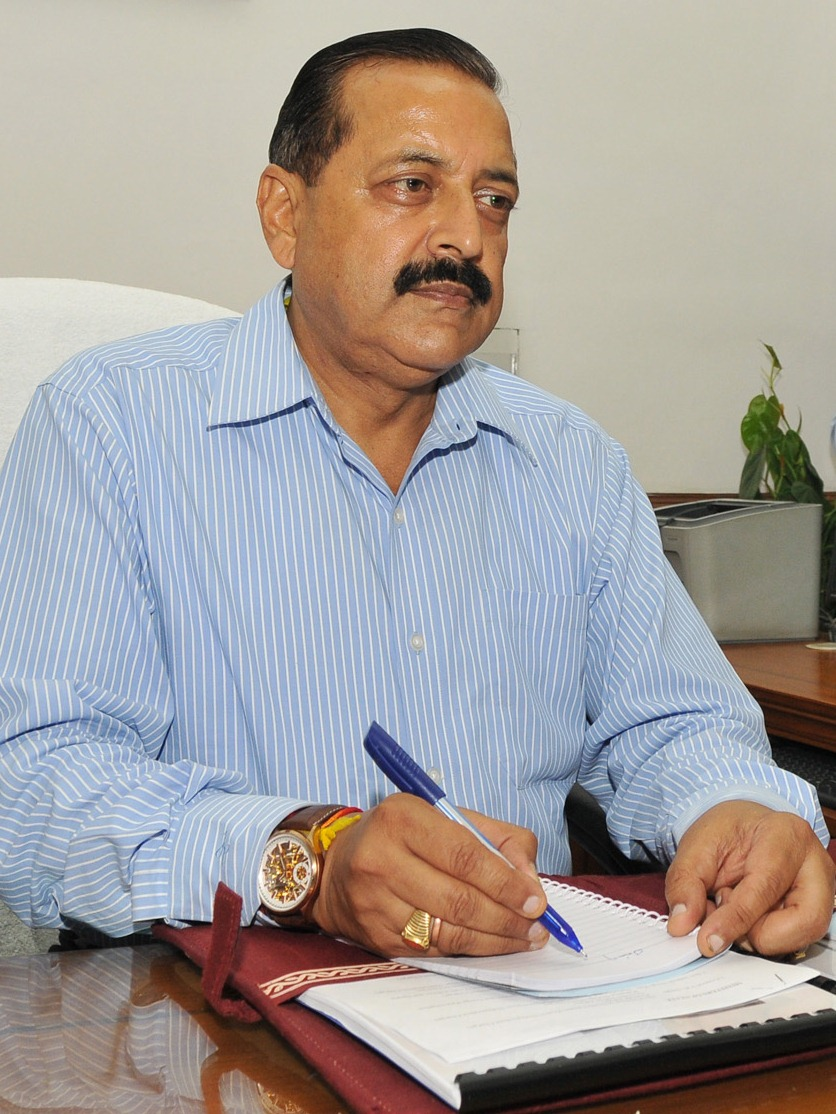
- Incumbent Jitendra Singh
- Party: BJP
- Alliance: NDA
- Elected year: 2024

Udhampur Lok Sabha constituency is one of the six Lok Sabha (parliamentary) constituencies in Jammu and Kashmir in northern India. The constituency covers 20,230 square kilometres of mountainous Himalayan terrain, and is comparable to the size of Israel. It is composed of the districts of Kishtwar, Ramban, Kathua, Doda, and Udhampur. Udhampur constituency's population is over 2,400,000, and exceeds the population of New Mexico. The seat from 1967 to 1980 was held by Karan Singh, the former crown prince of Jammu and Kashmir. It is currently represented by Union minister Jitendra Singh since 2014 from the Bharatiya Janata Party.

== Assembly segments ==
Following is the list of Legislative Assembly Constituencies that fall under Udhampur Lok Sabha in Jammu and Kashmir after delimitation was undertaken in 2022.

AC No.	AC Name	District	Member	Party
48	Inderwal	Kishtwar	Payare Lal Sharma	IND
49	Kishtwar	Kishtwar	Shagun Parihar	BJP
50	Padder-Nagseni	Kishtwar	Sunil Kumar Sharma	BJP
51	Bhadarwah	Doda	Daleep Singh Parihar	BJP
52	Doda	Doda	Mehraj Malik	AAP
53	Doda West	Doda	Shakti Raj	BJP
54	Ramban	Ramban	Arjun Singh Raju	JKNC
55	Banihal	Ramban	Sajad Shaheen	JKNC
59	Udhampur West	Udhampur	Pawan Kumar Gupta	BJP
60	Udhampur East	Udhampur	Ranbir Singh Pathania	BJP
61	Chenani	Udhampur	Balwant Singh Mankotia	BJP
62	Ramnagar (SC)	Udhampur	Sunil Bhardwaj	BJP
63	Bani	Kathua	Rameshwar Singh	IND
64	Billawar	Kathua	Satish Kumar Sharma	BJP
65	Basohli	Kathua	Darshan Kumar	BJP
66	Jasrota	Kathua	Rajiv Jasrotia	BJP
67	Kathua (SC)	Kathua	Bharat Bhushan	BJP
68	Hiranagar	Kathua	Vijay Kumar	BJP

== Members of Parliament ==
Year	Winner	Party
1957	Inderjit Malhotra	Indian National Congress
1967	Karan Singh	Indian National Congress
1968^	G. S. Brigadier	Indian National Congress
1971	Karan Singh	Indian National Congress
1977	Karan Singh	Indian National Congress
1980	Karan Singh	Indian National Congress (U)
1984	Girdhari Lal Dogra	Indian National Congress
1989	Dharam Paul	Indian National Congress
1996	Chaman Lal Gupta	Bharatiya Janata Party
1998	Chaman Lal Gupta	Bharatiya Janata Party
1999	Chaman Lal Gupta	Bharatiya Janata Party
2004	Chaudhary Lal Singh	Indian National Congress
2009	Chaudhary Lal Singh	Indian National Congress
2014	Jitendra Singh Rana	Bharatiya Janata Party
2019	Jitendra Singh Rana	Bharatiya Janata Party
2024	Jitendra Singh Rana	Bharatiya Janata Party

^ by poll

== Election results ==
=== 2024 ===
2024 Indian general election: Udhampur
Party	Candidate	Votes	%	±%
BJP	Jitendra Singh	571,076	51.28	▼10.10
INC	Chaudhary Lal Singh	4,46,703	40.11	▲9.01
DPAP	G. M. Saroori	39,599	3.56	New
NOTA	None of the Above	12,938	1.16	▲0.52
Majority		1,24,373	11.17	▼19.11
Turnout		11,13,696	68.27	▼2.74
BJP hold		Swing	▼10.10	

=== 2019 ===
2019 Indian general elections: Udhampur
Party	Candidate	Votes	%	±%
BJP	Jitendra Singh	724,311	61.38	▲14.60
INC	Vikramaditya Singh	3,67,059	31.10	▼9.83
JKNPP	Harsh Dev Singh	24,319	2.06	▼0.37
DSSP	Chaudhary Lal Singh	19,049	1.61	New
BSP	Tilak Raj Bhagat	16,601	1.41	▼0.17
NOTA	None of the Above	7,568	0.64	▼0.37
Majority		3,57,252	30.28	▲24.43
Turnout		11,82,680	71.01	▲0.10
BJP hold		Swing	▲14.60	

=== 2014 ===
2014 Indian general elections: Udhampur
Party	Candidate	Votes	%	±%
BJP	Jitendra Singh	487,369	46.78	▲11.07
INC	Ghulam Nabi Azad	4,26,393	40.93	▲3.03
JKPDP	Mohd. Arshad Malik	30,461	2.92	▼2.03
JKNPP	Bhim Singh	25,312	2.43	▼8.93
BSP	Dharam Pal Balgotra	16,437	1.58	▼1.93
IND	Anil Khajuria	15,188	1.46	New
NOTA	None of the Above	10,478	1.01	New
Majority		60,976	5.85	▲3.66
Turnout		10,41,758	70.91	▲26.03
BJP gain from INC		Swing	▲8.86	

=== 2009 ===
2009 Indian general elections: Udhampur
Party	Candidate	Votes	%	±%
INC	Ch. Lal Singh	231,853	37.90	▼1.71
BJP	Nirmal Kumar Singh	2,18,459	35.71	▲3.86
JKNPP	Bhim Singh	69,463	11.36	▲3.16
JKPDP	Balbir Singh	30,294	4.95	New
BSP	Rakesh Wazir	21,445	3.51	▲0.39
CPI	Adrees Ahmad Tabbasum	16,598	2.71	New
Majority		13,394	2.19	▼0.06
Turnout		13,63,060	44.90	▼0.19
INC hold		Swing		

=== 2004 ===
2004 Indian general elections: Udhampur
Party	Candidate	Votes	%	±%
INC	Ch. Lal Singh	240,872	39.61	
BJP	Chaman Lal Gupta	1,93,697	31.85	
JKNC	Khalid Najib Suharwardy	69,971	11.51	
JKNPP	Bhim Singh	49,869	8.20	
BSP	Jia Lal Verma	18,974	3.12	
Majority		47,175	7.76	
Turnout		6,08,074	45.09	
INC gain from BJP		Swing		

== See also ==
- Doda district
- Kathua district
- Kishtwar district
- Ramban district
- Udhampur district
- List of constituencies of the Lok Sabha
