= Inder Jit Malhotra =

Indian politician

Member of Lok Sabha
- In office 1959–1977
- Preceded by: Thakur Das Malhotra (INC)
- Succeeded by: Thakur Baldev Singh
- Constituency: Jammu

Personal details
- Born: 17 March 1929 Changran village, near Kathua, India
- Died: 24 March 1993 (aged 64) New Delhi, India
- Party: INC
- Spouse(s): Shashi Malhotra, née Kapur
- Children: One son and one daughter.
- As of 9 May, 2014

Inder Jit Malhotra (17 March 1929 – 24 March 1993) was a member of the Lok Sabha, the lower house of the Parliament of India, representing the constituency of Jammu. A member of the Indian National Congress party, he served in the 2nd, 3rd, 4th, and 5th formations of the Lok Sabha from 1959 until he retired from office in 1977 from Kathua and Jammu. Prior to 1967, he was elected by the Legislative Assembly of Jammu and Kashmir to represent Jammu as a member of parliament. Direct elections for parliamentary seats by Jammu and Kashmir constituents began in 1967, when the 4th Lok Sabha was formed.

The son of Thakur Das Malhotra, Inder Jit Malhotra was first elected to Parliament by the Legislative Assembly following the tragic and unexpected death of his father, who held the seat previously and suffered a fatal heart attack while delivering a political speech. He completed his undergraduate education in India, and then pursued graduate study in the United States, earning a Master in Journalism from the University of Oregon and a Master of Science in agriculture from Kansas State University.
