= Arvind Gupta =

Arvind Gupta may refer to:

- Arvind Gupta (toy inventor), Indian science educator, toy inventor and author
- Arvind Gupta (administrator), Indian civil servant and defence expert
- Arvind Gupta (computer scientist) (born c. 1961), Indo-Canadian computer scientist
- Arvind Gupta (politician), Indian politician from Jammu & Kashmir
