= 2004 elections in India =

2004 Indian elections
- ← 2002 2003 2004 2005 2006 →
- Incumbent Prime Minister: Manmohan Singh (UPA)
- Next Lok Sabha: 14th

Lok Sabha elections
- Seats contested: 543

Rajya Sabha elections
- Overall control: Indian National Congress
- Seats contested: TBD
- Net seat change: TBD

State elections
- States contested: 7
- Net state change: TBD

The 2004 elections in India includes the general election and elections to the Rajya Sabha, to state legislative assemblies, to Panchayats and urban local bodies.

== General election ==
Date	Country	Government before election	Prime Minister before election	Government after election	Prime Minister after election
20 April to 10 May 2004	India	National Democratic Alliance	Atal Bihari Vajpayee	United Progressive Alliance	Manmohan Singh
20 April to 10 May 2004	India	National Democratic Alliance	Atal Bihari Vajpayee	Left Front	Manmohan Singh

== Overall result ==
Date(s)	State	Government before	Chief Minister before	Government after	Elected Chief Minister	Maps
20 April and 26 April 2004	Andhra Pradesh	Telugu Desam Party	N. Chandrababu Naidu	Indian National Congress	Y. S. Rajasekhara Reddy	
20 April and 26 April 2004	Odisha	Biju Janata Dal	Naveen Patnaik	Biju Janata Dal	Naveen Patnaik	
20 April and 26 April 2004	Karnataka	Indian National Congress	S. M. Krishna	Indian National Congress	Dharam Singh	
20 April and 26 April 2004	Karnataka	Indian National Congress	S. M. Krishna	Janata Dal (Secular)	Dharam Singh	
10 May 2004	Sikkim	Sikkim Democratic Front	Pawan Kumar Chamling	Sikkim Democratic Front	Pawan Kumar Chamling	
13 October 2004	Arunachal Pradesh	Indian National Congress	Gegong Apang	Indian National Congress	Gegong Apang	
13 October 2004	Maharashtra	Indian National Congress	Sushilkumar Shinde	Indian National Congress	Vilasrao Deshmukh	
13 October 2004	Maharashtra	Nationalist Congress Party	Sushilkumar Shinde	Nationalist Congress Party	Vilasrao Deshmukh	

== Legislative Assembly elections ==
=== Andhra Pradesh ===
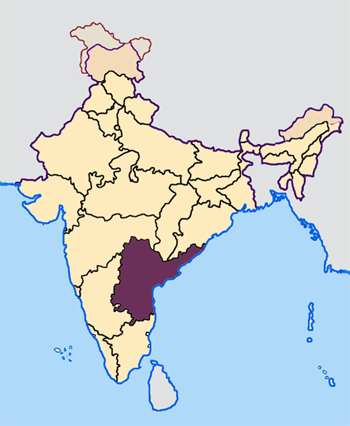
Andhra Pradesh

Party	No. of candidates	No. of elected	No. of votes	%
Bharatiya Janata Party	27	2	942008	2,63%
Bahujan Samaj Party	160	1	440719	1,23%
Communist Party of India	12	6	545867	1.53%
Communist Party of India (Marxist)	14	9	656721	1,84%
Indian National Congress	234	185	13793461	38,56%
Telugu Desam Party	267	47	13444168	37,59%
Communist Party of India (Marxist-Leninist) Liberation	11	0	66997	0,19%
Janata Dal (Secular)	5	0	3864	0,01%
Indian Union Muslim League	2	0	5371	0,02%
Rashtriya Janata Dal	8	0	2725	0,01%
Samajwadi Party	19	1	95416	0,27%
Akhil Bharatiya Jan Sangh	4	0	3792	0,01%
All India Majlis-e-Ittehadul Muslimeen	7	4	375165	1,05%
Ambedkar National Congress	5	0	6573	0,02%
Backward Castes United Front	7	0	3652	0,01%
Bahujan Republican Party	9	0	10576	0,03%
Bharatiya Rashtravadi Paksha	1	0	542	0,00%
Bahujan Samaj Party (Ambedkar)	1	0	2339	0,01%
Indian Justice Party	2	0	1361	0,00%
Janata Party	37	2	306347	0,86%
Lok Janshakti Party	4	0	21550	0,06%
Majlis Bachao Tahreek	7	0	70285	0,20%
Marxist Communist Party of India	16	0	23373	0,06%
Mudiraj Rashtriya Samithi	5	0	10606	0,03%
NTR Telugu Desam Party (Lakshmi Parvathi)	18	0	7857	0,02%
Praja Party	8	0	4439	0,01%
Pyramid Party of India	65	0	115187	0,32%
Peoples Republican Party	1	0	1515	0,00%
Rashtriya Praja Congress (Secular)	1	0	1037	0,00%
Republican Party of India	3	0	1523	0,00%
Republican Party of India (Athvale)	1	0	956	0,00%
Republican Party of India (Khobragade)	5	0	6031	0,02%
Samajwadi Janata Party (Rashtriya)	1	0	1991	0,01%
Telangana Congress Party	1	0	52161	0,15%
Telangana Praja Party	2	0	1083	0,00%
Bharat Rashtra Samithi	54	26	2390940	6,68%
Independents	872	11	2349436	6,57%
Total:	1896	294	35767634	

The elected independents include one member of the Communist Party of India (Marxist-Leninist) New Democracy.

=== Karnataka ===
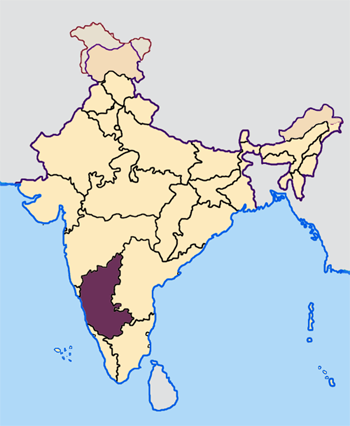
Karnataka

Party	No. of candidates	No. of elected	No. of votes	%
Bharatiya Janata Party	198	79	7118658	28,33%
Bahujan Samaj Party	102	0	437564	1,74%
Communist Party of India	5	0	26223	0,10%
Communist Party of India (Marxist)	5	1	92081	0,37%
Indian National Congress	224	65	8861959	35,27%
Janata Dal (Secular)	220	58	5220121	20,77%
Janata Dal (United)	26	5	517904	2,06%
All India Anna Dravida Munnetra Kazhagam	2	0	16737	0,07%
All India Forward Bloc	1	0	657	0,00%
Communist Party of India (Marxist-Leninist) Liberation	2	0	2323	0,01%
Indian Union Muslim League	6	0	3698	0,01%
Shiv Sena	11	0	47805	0,19%
Samajwadi Party	15	0	11028	0,04%
All India Forward Bloc (Subhasist)	1	0	1099	0,00%
Ambedkar National Congress	2	0	1155	0,00%
Bharatiya Praja Paksha	1	0	228	0,00%
Bharatiya Peoples and National Security National Party	1	0	189	0,00%
Indian Christian Secular Party	1	0	111	0,00%
Janata Party	155	0	504932	2,01%
Kannada Chalavali Vatal Paksha	5	1	38687	0,15%
Kannada Nadu Party	188	1	330547	1,32%
Karnataka Rajya Ryota Sangha	10	0	52874	0,21%
Lok Janshakti Party	4	0	3775	0,02%
Manava Party	1	0	343	0,00%
Parcham Party of India	1	0	2058	0,01%
Pyramid Party of India	3	0	2866	0,01%
Republican Party of India	3	1	25379	0,10%
Republican Party of India (Athvale)	9	0	8483	0,03%
Sirpanch Samaj Party	3	0	4037	0,02%
Urs Samyuktha Paksha	67	0	66319	0,26%
Independents	442	13	1724480	6,57%
Total:	1715	224	25129066	

=== Orissa ===
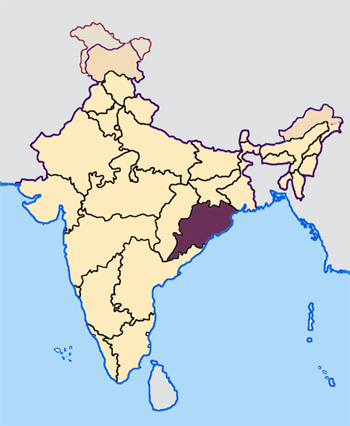
Orissa

Parliament diagram after the election Biju Janata Dal Bharatiya Janata Party Independents Communist Party of India (Marxist) Communist Party of India Orissa Gana Parishad Jharkhand Mukti Morcha Indian National Congress

Source:ECI

Party	No. of candidates	No. of elected	No. of votes	%
Indian National Congress	133	38	5896713	34,82%
Biju Janata Dal	84	61	4632280	27,36%
Bharatiya Janata Party	63	32	2898105	17,11%
Bahujan Samaj Party	86	0	326724	1,93%
Jharkhand Mukti Morcha	12	4	301777	1,78%
Orissa Gana Parishad	4	2	217998	1,29%
Communist Party of India	6	1	129989	0,77%
Samajwadi Party	29	0	99214	0,59%
Communist Party of India (Marxist)	3	1	93159	0,55%
Janata Dal (Secular)	8	0	75223	0,44%
Republican Party of India	23	0	47831	0,28%
Communist Party of India (Marxist-Leninist) Liberation	8	0	28531	0,17%
Samajwadi Jan Parishad	1	0	20365	0,12%
All Jharkhand Students Union	4	0	18982	0,11%
Bharatiya Manavata Vikas Party	10	0	12498	0,07%
Janata Dal (United)	5	0	12080	0,07%
Kosal Party	4	0	11062	0,07%
Shiv Sena	4	0	10733	0,06%
Jharkhand Party	3	0	8751	0,05%
Janata Party	4	0	8022	0,05%
Revolutionary Socialist Party	2	0	4469	0,03%
Rashtriya Janata Dal	4	0	2942	0,02%
Akhil Bharatiya Hindu Mahasabha	1	0	2159	0,01%
Lok Janshakti Party	1	0	1621	0,01%
Indian Justice Party	1	0	1563	0,01%
Jharkhand Disom Party	1	0	1489	0,01%
Proutist Sarva Samaj Party	1	0	1443	0,01%
Sirpanch Samaj Party	1	0	1251	0,01%
All India Forward Bloc	1	0	832	0,00%
Independents	295	8	2065650	12,20%
Total:	802	147	16933456	

=== Sikkim ===
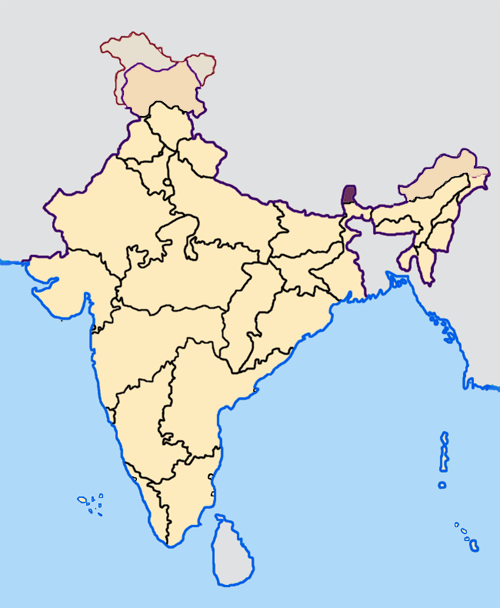
Sikkim

Party	No. of candidates	No. of elected	No. of votes	%
Bharatiya Janata Party	4	0	667	0,34%
Communist Party of India (Marxist)	1	0	144	0,07%
Indian National Congress	28	1	51329	26,13%
Sikkim Democratic Front	32	31	139662	71,09%
Sikkim Himali Rajya Parishad	9	0	1123	0,57%
Sikkim Sangram Parishad	1	0	90	0,05%
Independents	16	0	3450	1,76%
Total:	91	32	196465	

=== Arunachal Pradesh ===
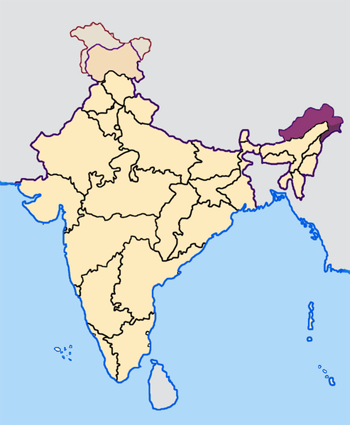
Arunachal Pradesh

Party	No. of candidates	No. of elected	No. of votes	%
Bharatiya Janata Party	39	9	87312	2.63%
Indian National Congress	60	34	204102	44.41%
Nationalist Congress Party	10	2	19673	4.28%
Arunachal Congress	11	2	17817	3.88%
Independents	48	13	130654	28.43%
Total:	168	60	459558	

=== Maharashtra ===
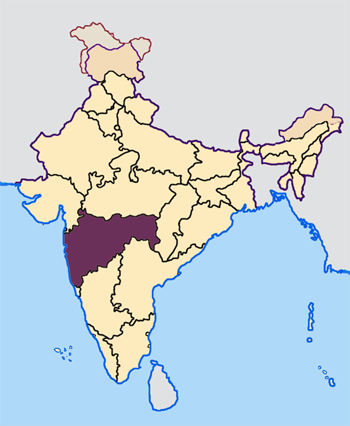
Maharashtra

Party	No. of candidates	No. of elected	No. of votes	%
Bharatiya Janata Party	111	56	5717287	13,67%
Bahujan Samaj Party	272	0	1671429	4,00%
Communist Party of India	15	0	59242	0,14%
Communist Party of India (Marxist)	16	3	259567	0,62%
Indian National Congress	157	69	8810363	21,06%
Nationalist Congress Party	124	71	7841962	18,75%
Shiv Sena	163	62	8351654	19,97%
All India Forward Bloc	2	0	2747	0,01%
Janata Dal (Secular)	34	0	242720	0,58%
Janata Dal (United)	17	0	16891	0,04%
Indian Union Muslim League	2	0	342	0,00%
Rashtriya Lok Dal	12	0	9538	0,02%
Samajwadi Party	95	0	471425	1,13%
Akhil Bharatiya Hindu Mahasabha	18	0	14914	0,04%
Akhil Bharatiya Sena	20	1	69986	0,17%
Apna Dal	1	0	1053	0,00%
All India Forward Bloc (Subhasist)	1	0	1113	0,00%
All India Krantikari Congress	3	0	1527	0,00%
Ambedkarist Republican Party	21	0	13282	0,03%
Bharipa Bahujan Mahasangha	83	1	516221	1,23%
Bharatiya Minorities Suraksha Mahasangh	1	0	223	0,00%
Bahujan Mahasangha Paksha	6	0	20478	0,05%
Bharatiya Rashtriya Swadeshi Congress Paksh	1	0	721	0,00%
Gondvana Gantantra Party	30	0	58288	0,14%
Hindu Ekta Andolan Party	1	0	273	0,00%
Hindustan Janata Party	2	0	1832	0,00%
Indian Justice Party	9	0	7153	0,02%
Indian Union Muslim League (dissident group)	1	0	111	0,00%
Janata Party	2	0	1497	0,00%
Jan Surajya Shakti	19	4	368156	0,88%
Kranti Kari Jai Hind Sena	14	0	10683	0,01%
Lok Janshakti Party	33	0	30180	0,07%
Lok Rajya Party	9	0	16738	0,04%
Maharashtra Rajiv Congress	2	0	586	0,00%
Maharashtra Secular Front	1	0	457	0,00%
National Loktantrik Party	15	0	9509	0,02%
Nag Vidarbha Andolan Samiti	1	0	29499	0,07%
Native People’s Party	1	0	315	0,00%
Peoples Republican Party	55	0	73806	0,18%
Prabuddha Republican Party	21	0	12501	0,03%
Peasants and Workers Party of India	43	2	549010	1,31%
Republican Party of India	4	0	62531	0,15%
Republican Party of India (Athvale)	20	1	206175	0,49%
Republican Party of India (Democratic)	18	0	12094	0,03%
Republican Party of India (Kamble)	2	0	866	0,00%
Rashtriya Samajik Nayak Paksha	6	0	10087	0,02%
Rashtriya Samaj Paksha	38	0	144753	0,35%
Sachet Bharat Party	1	0	378	0,00%
Samajwadi Janata Party(Maharashtra)	4	0	25866	0,06%
Samajwadi Janata Party (Rashtriya)	1	0	473	0,00%
Swatantra Bharat Paksha	7	1	176022	0,42%
Shivrajya Party	37	0	28071	0,07%
Savarn Samaj Party	1	0	262	0,00%
Samajwadi Jan Parishad	1	0	545	0,00%
Vidharbha Janata Congress	2	0	7417	0,02%
Vidharbha Rajya Party	10	0	6157	0,01%
Womanist Party of India	9	0	5215	0,01%
Independents	1083	19	5877454	14,05%
Total:	2678	288	41829645	

== Legislative By-elections ==
=== Himachal Pradesh ===
2004 Himachal Pradesh Legislative Assembly by-election: Guler
Party	Candidate	Votes	%	±%
BJP	Harbans Singh Rana	18,806	48.38%	▲8.63
INC	Neeraj Bharti	17,699	45.53%	▼8.96
Independent	Bhanu Parkash Choudhary	958	2.46%	New
BSP	Brahami Devi	604	1.55%	▲0.94
Independent	Subhash Chand	541	1.39%	New
HVC	Lakshman Singh	265	0.68%	New
Margin of victory		1,107	2.85%	▼11.89
Turnout		38,873	73.33%	▼4.10
Registered electors		53,010		▲1.97
BJP gain from INC		Swing	▼6.12	

=== Jammu and Kashmir ===
Winner, runner-up, voter turnout, and victory margin in every constituency
Assembly Constituency		Turnout	Winner				Runner Up				Margin
#k	Names	%	Candidate	Party	Votes	%	Candidate	Party	Votes	%	Margin
1	Basohli	59.76%	Kanta Andotra	INC	18,759	.97%	Jagdish Raj Sapolia	BJP	14,980	.66%	3,779
2	Pahalgam	21.64%	Mufti Mohammad Sayeed	JKPDP	9,056	3.75%	Rafi Ahmad Mir	JKNC	3,882	3.%	5,174
3	Batmaloo	11.72%	Tariq Ahmed Kara	JKPDP	6,856	4.58%	Irfan Ahmed Shah	JKNC	3,588	1.13%	3,268
4	Akhnoor	64.4%	Sham Lal Sharma	INC	17,251	31.19%	Govind Ram Sharma	Independent	13,675	24.73%	3,576
