= Chaudhary Lal Singh =

Indian politician (born 1959)

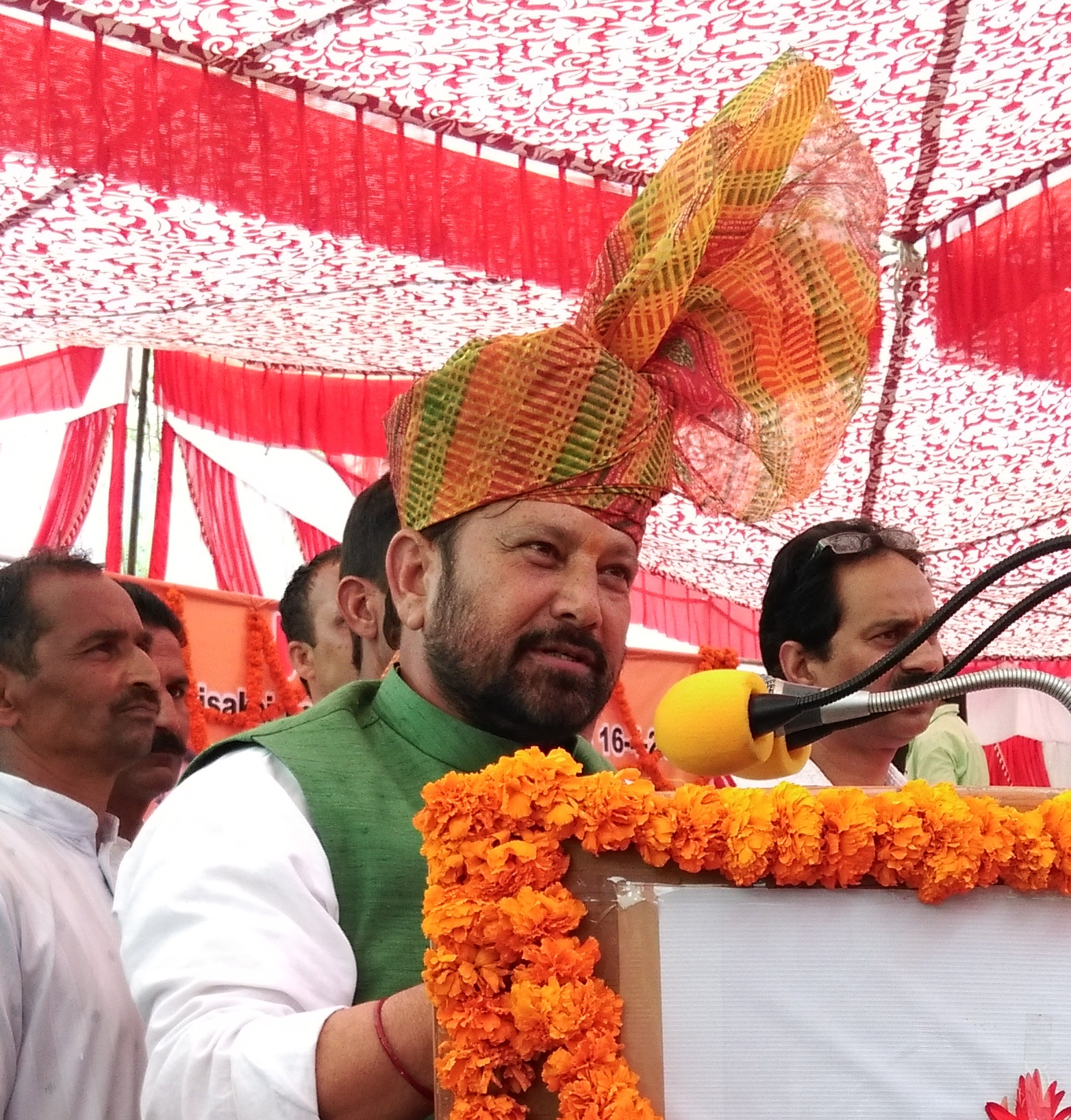
- Chaudhary Lal Singh speaking at a program at Billawar, Kathua

Minister for Forest, Environment, Ecology Government of Jammu and Kashmir
- In office 1 March 2015 – 14 April 2018
- Chief Minister: Mufti Mohammed Sayeed
- Preceded by: President's Rule
- Succeeded by: Governor's Rule
- Constituency: Basohli

Member of Jammu and Kashmir Legislative Assembly
- In office 2014 – 2018
- Preceded by: Jagdish Raj Sapolia
- Succeeded by: Darshan Kumar
- Constituency: Basohli

Personal details
- Party: Indian National Congress (Since 2024) (before 2014)
- Other political affiliations: Dogra Swabhimaan Sangathan Party (DSSP) (2019-2024) Bhartiya Janata Party (2014-2019)
- Spouse: Kanta Andotra
- Website: www.facebook.com/thechlalsingh

Chaudhary Lal Singh (born 2 February 1959) is an Indian politician from Jammu and Kashmir. He was Minister for Forest, Environment, Ecology of J&K in PDP-BJP coalition government in J&K. He represented the Basohli in Jammu and Kashmir Legislative Assembly.

He was Founder Chairman and his wife Smt. Kanta Andotra (Ex.MLA) is President of the Dogra Swabhimaan Sangathan Party.

== Political career ==
Singh started his political career as a student leader. He was elected as MLA from Basholi constituency in 1996 J&K Assembly elections. He was re-elected as MLA from Basohli constituency in the 2002 J&K Assembly Elections. He was inducted into the state cabinet as Minister for Health and Medical Education in Congress-PDP coalition government. After that he was elected as MP in 14th Lok Sabha in 2004 from Udhampur constituency. He was again elected as MP from there in the 15th Lok Sabha in 2009.

== Change in political affiliation ==
In August 2014, Singh parted ways with Congress after being denied ticket as Congress candidate during 16th Lok Sabha elections. He formally joined Bhartiya Janata Party in presence of BJP President Amit Shah at a function in Kathua. He resigned as cabinet minister in 2018 and left BJP. Later, formed his own party "Dogra Swabhimaan Sangathan Party".

On 20 March 2024, he joined Indian National Congress.

== CBI probe against Chaudhary Lal Singh ==
CBI initiates probe into education trust run by former J&K Minister Chaudhary Lal Singh. HC stays re-investigation of this case.

== Controversy ==
In 2018 he was accused of supporting of the accused rapists in the Kathua Rape and Murder case. Singh defended his attendance at the rally, stating that he was there to "defuse the situation". Nonetheless, Singh resigned as a result of the controversy. He stood by his demand of CBI enquiry for justice to the victim and held large rallies for this demand.
