= Nowshera Assembly constituency =

Constituency of the Jammu and Kashmir Legislative Assembly

Coordinates: 33.16°N 74.24°E

Nowshera
- Constituency No. 84 for the Jammu and Kashmir Legislative Assembly

Constituency details
- Country: India
- Region: North India
- Union Territory: Jammu and Kashmir
- District: Rajouri
- Lok Sabha constituency: Anantnag - Rajouri
- Established: 1962

Member of Legislative Assembly
- 13th Jammu and Kashmir Legislative Assembly
- Incumbent Surinder Kumar Choudhary
- Party: Jammu & Kashmir National Conference
- Elected year: 2024

Nowshera is one of the 90 constituencies in the Legislative Assembly of Jammu and Kashmir, a northern Union Territory of India. Nowshera is also part of Anantnag–Rajouri Lok Sabha constituency.

== Members of the Legislative Assembly ==
Election	Member	Party
1962	Master Beli Ram Sharma	Jammu & Kashmir National Conference
1967	Master Beli Ram Sharma	Indian National Congress
1972	Master Beli Ram Sharma	Indian National Congress
1977	Master Beli Ram Sharma	Indian National Congress
1983	Master Beli Ram Sharma	Indian National Congress
1987	Master Beli Ram Sharma	Indian National Congress
1996	Radhay Sham Sharma	Indian National Congress
2002	Romesh Chander Sharma	Indian National Congress
2008	Radhay Sham Sharma	Jammu & Kashmir National Conference
2014	Ravinder Raina	Bharatiya Janata Party
2024	Surinder Kumar Choudhary	Jammu and Kashmir National Conference

== Election results ==
=== Assembly Election 2024 ===
2024 Jammu and Kashmir Legislative Assembly election : Nowshera
Party	Candidate	Votes	%	±%
JKNC	Surinder Kumar Choudhary	35,069	54.16%	New
BJP	Ravinder Raina	27,250	42.09%	▼7.43
BSP	Manohar Singh	1,456	2.25%	New
JKPDP	Haq Nawaz	425	0.66%	▼36.27
NOTA	None of the Above	222	0.34%	▼0.22
Margin of victory		7,819	12.08%	▼0.51
Turnout		64,748	74.85%	▼4.83
Registered electors		86,506		▼8.68
JKNC gain from BJP		Swing	▲4.65	

=== Assembly Election 2014 ===
2014 Jammu and Kashmir Legislative Assembly election : Nowshera
Party	Candidate	Votes	%	±%
BJP	Ravinder Raina	37,374	49.51%	▲30.75
JKPDP	Surinder Kumar Choudhary	27,871	36.92%	▲33.88
INC	Ravinder Kumar Sharma	5,342	7.08%	▼13.27
Independent	Rajinder Kumar	1,208	1.60%	New
JKNC	Radhay Sham Sharma	1,099	1.46%	▼25.02
JKNPP	Yash Pal	697	0.92%	▼4.06
Independent	Ashwani Kumar Sharma	484	0.64%	New
NOTA	None of the Above	423	0.56%	New
Margin of victory		9,503	12.59%	▲6.46
Turnout		75,481	79.68%	▲6.61
Registered electors		94,729		▲10.99
BJP gain from JKNC		Swing	▲23.04	

=== Assembly Election 2008 ===
2008 Jammu and Kashmir Legislative Assembly election : Nowshera
Party	Candidate	Votes	%	±%
JKNC	Radhay Sham Sharma	16,511	26.47%	▼5.00
INC	Romesh Chander Sharma	12,691	20.35%	▼19.90
BSP	Surinder Kumar Choudhary	12,186	19.54%	▲16.09
BJP	Vishwinder Dev	11,701	18.76%	New
JKNPP	Shamsher Singh	3,109	4.99%	New
Independent	Ajeet Singh	1,970	3.16%	New
JKPDP	Arshad Mehmood	1,896	3.04%	New
Margin of victory		3,820	6.13%	▼2.65
Turnout		62,365	73.07%	▲15.23
Registered electors		85,347		▼3.12
JKNC gain from INC		Swing	▼13.78	

=== Assembly Election 2002 ===
2002 Jammu and Kashmir Legislative Assembly election : Nowshera
Party	Candidate	Votes	%	±%
INC	Romesh Chander Sharma	20,511	40.25%	▼10.44
JKNC	Radhey Sham Sharma	16,037	31.47%	▲4.66
Independent	Vishwinder Dev	9,424	18.49%	New
Independent	Sushil Kumar	3,228	6.33%	New
BSP	Yesh Paul	1,757	3.45%	New
Margin of victory		4,474	8.78%	▼15.11
Turnout		50,957	57.86%	▼4.02
Registered electors		88,099		▲36.52
INC hold		Swing	▼10.44	

=== Assembly Election 1996 ===
1996 Jammu and Kashmir Legislative Assembly election : Nowshera
Party	Candidate	Votes	%	±%
INC	Radhay Sham Sharma	20,238	50.70%	▼9.82
JKNC	Rattan Singh	10,702	26.81%	New
BJP	Darshan Lal	7,984	20.00%	▲13.38
JD	Balwant Singh	549	1.38%	New
JKNPP	Kali Dass	313	0.78%	▼0.14
Margin of victory		9,536	23.89%	▼22.01
Turnout		39,921	62.63%	▼5.58
Registered electors		64,532		▲9.48
INC hold		Swing	▼9.82	

=== Assembly Election 1987 ===
1987 Jammu and Kashmir Legislative Assembly election : Nowshera
Party	Candidate	Votes	%	±%
INC	Beli Ram	24,053	60.51%	▲30.47
Independent	Balwant Singh	5,808	14.61%	New
Independent	Krishan Lal	4,545	11.43%	New
BJP	Sat Paul Sharma	2,633	6.62%	▲3.55
Independent	Shamsher Singh	1,619	4.07%	New
JP	Khem Raj Khajuria	537	1.35%	New
JKNPP	Kamal Goria	368	0.93%	New
Margin of victory		18,245	45.90%	▲36.67
Turnout		39,749	68.54%	▲3.46
Registered electors		58,942		▲8.99
INC hold		Swing	▲30.47	

=== Assembly Election 1983 ===
1983 Jammu and Kashmir Legislative Assembly election : Nowshera
Party	Candidate	Votes	%	±%
INC	Beli Ram	10,395	30.05%	▼0.84
JKNC	Rachpal Singh	7,202	20.82%	▲5.87
Independent	Rattan Singh	6,310	18.24%	New
Independent	Nand Kumar	5,337	15.43%	New
Independent	Chandi Ram	1,544	4.46%	New
Independent	Ashok Kumar	1,223	3.53%	New
BJP	Kali Dass	1,065	3.08%	New
Margin of victory		3,193	9.23%	▲7.59
Turnout		34,597	65.39%	▲5.07
Registered electors		54,078		▲25.62
INC hold		Swing	▼0.84	

=== Assembly Election 1977 ===
1977 Jammu and Kashmir Legislative Assembly election : Nowshera
Party	Candidate	Votes	%	±%
INC	Beli Ram	7,832	30.89%	▼13.15
Independent	Rattan Singh	7,416	29.25%	New
JP	Tilak Raj	6,077	23.97%	New
JKNC	Nand Kumar	3,790	14.95%	New
Independent	Jagdev Raj	242	0.95%	New
Margin of victory		416	1.64%	▲1.38
Turnout		25,357	60.01%	▼2.75
Registered electors		43,048		▲36.49
INC hold		Swing	▼13.15	

=== Assembly Election 1972 ===
1972 Jammu and Kashmir Legislative Assembly election : Nowshera
Party	Candidate	Votes	%	±%
INC	Beli Ram	8,563	44.04%	▲5.19
Independent	Nand Kumar	8,512	43.77%	New
ABJS	Sat Paul Sharma	1,570	8.07%	▼1.92
Independent	Tarlok Chand	800	4.11%	New
Margin of victory		51	0.26%	▼8.13
Turnout		19,445	63.53%	▼0.26
Registered electors		31,539		▲17.52
INC hold		Swing	▲5.19	

=== Assembly Election 1967 ===
1967 Jammu and Kashmir Legislative Assembly election : Nowshera
Party	Candidate	Votes	%	±%
INC	Beli Ram	6,454	38.84%	New
PSP	N. Kumar	5,060	30.45%	▲18.05
Democratic National Conference	D. Nath	3,441	20.71%	▼2.39
ABJS	Sat Paul Sharma	1,660	9.99%	New
Margin of victory		1,394	8.39%	▼22.81
Turnout		16,615	64.45%	▲0.48
Registered electors		26,836		▼22.89
INC gain from JKNC		Swing	▼15.46	

=== Assembly Election 1962 ===
1962 Jammu and Kashmir Legislative Assembly election : Nowshera
Party	Candidate	Votes	%	±%
JKNC	Beli Ram	11,608	54.30%	New
Democratic National Conference	Krishan Dev Sethi	4,939	23.10%	New
PSP	Nand Kumar	2,651	12.40%	New
JPP	Ved Prakash	1,622	7.59%	New
Independent	Behari Lal	557	2.61%	New
Margin of victory		6,669	31.20%	
Turnout		21,377	62.44%	
Registered electors		34,800		
JKNC win (new seat)				

== See also ==
- Nowshera
- List of constituencies of Jammu and Kashmir Legislative Assembly
