= Thakur Baldev Singh =

Indian politician

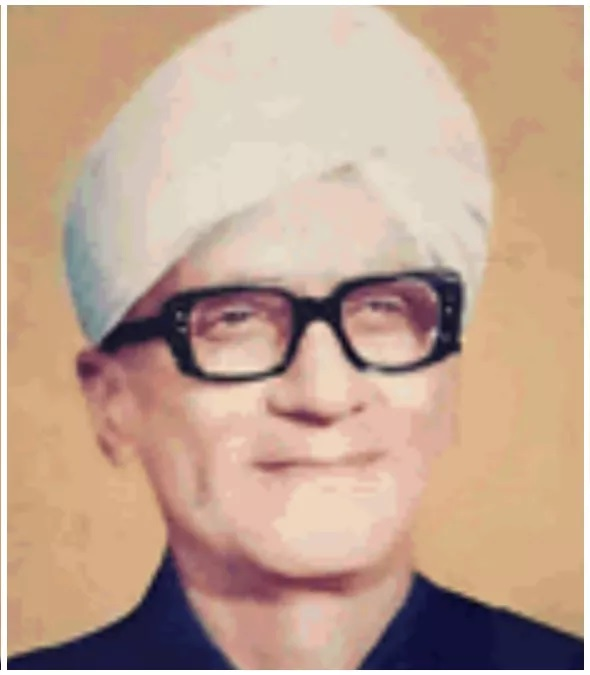
- File photo of Thakur Baldev Singh.

Member of Lok Sabha
- In office 1977–1980
- Governor: Lakshmi Kant Jha
- Preceded by: Inder Jit Malhotra
- Succeeded by: Girdhari Lal Dogra
- Constituency: Jammu

President of BJP (J&K)
- In office 1980–1989
- Succeeded by: Chaman Lal Gupta

Personal details
- Born: 18 June 1919 Poona (now Pune), Bombay Presidency.
- Died: 25 August 2008 (aged 89) Kathua, Jammu and Kashmir.
- Party: Praja Parishad (1942 - 1963), Bharatiya Jana Sangh (1963 - 1977), Bharatiya Janata Party (1980 - 2008)
- Spouse: Bimla Devi
- Children: Four sons, three daughters
- Education: B.A., LL.B. Punjab University (Lahore)
- Occupation: Politician

Thakur Baldev Singh (18 June 1919 – 25 August 2008) was an Indian Politician from Jammu and Kashmir. He was member of Lok Sabha from Jammu, State President of Bharatiya Jana Sangh and later Bharatiya Janata Party (Jammu and Kashmir). He was elected to the 6th Lok Sabha. He was also a two time member of the Jammu and Kashmir Legislative Assembly.

He worked for the poor and spoke for Dogras in Lok Sabha. He was called 'People's Leader'.

== Early life ==
Born in Poona (now Pune), Bombay Presidency where his father Subedar Major Narayan Singh was posted in the British Indian Army. Baldev Singh grew up in a Jasrotia Rajput family with patriotic and nationalistic sentiments. He was a law graduate from Punjab University, Lahore.

== Political career ==
Singh joined Jammu Praja Parishad in 1942. He went to jail in 1949 and 1952 for the merger of Jammu and Kashmir with India and the abrogation of Article 370 of the Indian Constitution during the Jammu Praja Parishad Movement along with Syama Prasad Mukherjee. In 1977 he constested for the Lok Sabha from Jammu Lok Sabha constituency as an independent candidate and won securing 1,53,837 votes against Balraj Puri of Jammu and Kashmir National Conference with a margin of 27,939 votes. In 1980 he was elected to Jammu and Kashmir Legislative Assembly on Bharatiya Janata Party ticket from Hiranagar Assembly constituency. In 1987 he was again elected to Legislative Assembly from Hiranagar on BJP ticket securing 17,088 votes against Ram Das Dogra of Indian National Congress with a margin of 2,508 votes.

== Personal life ==
Singh was married to Bimla Devi and had four sons and three daughters. He loved playing hockey, gardening and hunting.
