= Prithvi Chand =

Indian politician

Prithvi Chand is an Indian politician and member of the Bharatiya Janata Party. Chand was a member of the Jammu and Kashmir Legislative Assembly from the Ramnagar constituency in Udhampur District.

== Electoral performance ==
Election	Constituency	Party	Result	Votes %	Opposition Candidate	Opposition Party	Opposition vote %	Ref
2002	Chenani	BJP	Lost	3.74%	Faquir Nath	JKNPP	37.42%	
1996	Chenani	BJP	Won	43.08%	Krishan Chander	INC	31.15%	
1987	Ramnagar	BJP	Lost	10.74%	Chandhu Lal	INC	58.77%	
1983	Ramnagar	BJP	Lost	7.00%	Ram Dass	INC	56.00%	
1977	Ramnagar	JP	Won	53.19%	Ram Dass	INC	29.66%	
