= Durga Dass =

Indian politician

Durga Dass is an Indian politician and member of the Jammu and Kashmir National Panthers Party. Dass was a member of the Jammu and Kashmir Legislative Assembly from the Hiranagar constituency in Kathua district.
