= Dina Nath Bhagat =

Indian politician (1946–2025)

Dina Nath Bhagat (1946 – 8 September 2025) was an Indian politician from Jammu and Kashmir. He won the 2014 Jammu and Kashmir Legislative Assembly election from the Chanani constituency which is reserved for Scheduled Caste community in Udhampur district elected on BJP ticket.

== Background ==
Bhagat was born in 1946, and came from Chenani, Udhampur district, Jammu and Kashmir. He was the son of Lalchand Ram. Bhagat was a retired government employee. He completed his Class 10 at Government High School, Thial in 1967.

Bhagat died on 8 September 2025, at the age of 79.

== Career ==
Bhagat won from Chanani Assembly constituency in the 2014 Jammu and Kashmir Legislative Assembly election. He polled 33,047 votes and defeated his nearest rival, Krishan Chander of the Indian National Congress, by a margin of 20,332 votes.

== Electoral performance ==
Election	Constituency	Party	Result	Votes %	Opposition Candidate	Opposition Party	Opposition vote %	Ref
2014	Chenani	BJP	Won	50.17%	Krishan Chander	INC	19.30%	
2008	Chenani	BJP	Lost	21.44%	Krishan Chander	INC	35.47%	
