= Mangat Ram Sharma =

Indian politician

3rd Deputy Chief Minister of Jammu and Kashmir state
- In office 2 November 2002 – 2 November 2005
- Preceded by: Devi Das Thakur
- Succeeded by: Muzaffar Hussain Baig

Pandit Mangat Ram Sharma (died 3 November 2016) was an Indian politician and Deputy Chief Minister of Jammu and Kashmir as well as speaker of Jammu and Kashmir Legislative Assembly. He was a leader of the Indian National Congress.

He also won Jammu-Poonch Lok Sabha seat in 1996.

He was Deputy Chief Minister of Jammu and Kashmir from November 2002 to November 2005 under Mufti Muhammad Sayeed which was PDP-Congress coalition government. He was also Health Minister of Jammu and Kashmir under Ghulam Nabi Azad. Pandit Mangat Ram had created history by becoming the first Deputy Chief Minister from the Congress. He was the second Deputy Chief Minister from the Jammu region.

In 1984, Devi Das Thakur, a Supreme Court lawyer, became the first Deputy Chief Minister from the Jammu region in the government headed by GM Shah. He was not a Congress leader.

It was only with the appointment of Mangat Ram as the Deputy Chief Minister that a precedent had been set to appoint the Deputy Chief Minister from the Jammu region if the Chief Minister was from the Kashmir valley to ease acrimonious tension between the two regions.

In his six-decade-long political career, Mangat Ram had served the state in different capacities. He was the only leader in the state to earn respect in all three regions of J&K.

He was known for his accessibility and unlike other politicians, was easily available to the common man during his days in power. He remained as troubleshooter for the Congress for years together.

Mangat Ram had effectively handled the controversial Jammu and Kashmir Permanent Residents Women (Disqualification) Bill in 2004 and saved the then coalition regime.

He had started his career as a social activist in the early 1950s. He resigned from government service as Block Development Officer and joined active politics in the 1960s.

He was made a Member of the Legislative Council in 1961 and 1968.

In 1972, he entered the Assembly from the Basohli segment of Kathua district in the Jammu region on Congress ticket. He was re-elected from the same constituency in 1977 and 1983.

He was elected as MLA from the Jammu West Assembly constituencies in 1987 and 2002. In the 1996 General Election, he won from the Jammu-Poonch segment.

He was described in political circles as one of the most astute politicians and was close to the Gandhi family. As Speaker of the Assembly, he earned respect among the legislators for his unassuming and impartial nature.

Born on November 18, 1926, in Jammu, Mangat Ram was a prominent politician of the Congress. He graduated from the GGM Science College J&K University, in 1952.

He is survived by six sons, daughters-in-law and grandchildren.

== Electoral performance ==
Election	Constituency	Party	Result	Votes %	Opposition Candidate	Opposition Party	Opposition vote %	Ref
2008	Jammu West	INC	Lost	16.26%	Chaman Lal Gupta	BJP	40.26%	
2002	Jammu West	INC	Won	40.47%	Virander Kumar Gupta	Independent	27.96%	
1987	Jammu West	INC	Won	48.99%	Chander Mohan Sharma	BJP	30.63%	
1983	Basohli	INC	Won	53.42%	Darshan Kumar Sharma	JKNC	34.06%	
1977	Basohli	INC	Won	29.96%	Uttam Chand	Independent	24.10%	
1972	Basohli	INC	Won	56.43%	Baldev Singh	ABJS	34.94%	
1967	Basohli	INC	Won	53.25%	U. Chand	ABJS	27.79%	
1962	Basohli	JKNC	Won	59.11%	Uttam Chand	JPP	35.65%	
