= Ravinder Raina =

Indian politician (born 1977)

President of Bharatiya Janata Party, Jammu and Kashmir
- In office 13 May 2018 – 3 November 2024
- Preceded by: Sat Paul Sharma
- Succeeded by: Sat Paul Sharma

Member of Jammu and Kashmir Legislative Assembly
- In office 23 December 2014 – 21 November 2018
- Preceded by: Radhay Sham Sharma
- Succeeded by: Surinder Kumar Choudhary
- Constituency: Nowshera

Personal details
- Born: 31 January 1977 (age 49) Nowshera, Jammu and Kashmir, India
- Party: Bharatiya Janata Party
- Education: Diploma in International Law and Human Rights
- Occupation: Politician

Ravinder Raina (born 31 January 1977) is an Indian politician from Jammu and Kashmir. He is a member of Rashtriya Swayamsevak Sangh (RSS). He was the last president of BJP J&K state unit and first president of J&K union territory unit.

== Early life and education ==
He was born on 31 January 1977 to Shri Pushap Dutt into a Pahari-Poonchi Brahmin family (displaced from Pakistan-Administered Jammu and Kashmir) in Nowshera, in the Rajouri district of Jammu. He did his graduation in B.Sc. in 1999 from Jammu University, Jammu. He also holds a postgraduate degree in International law of Human Rights. After completing graduation, Raina joined the Indian navy but later he returned as Human Rights activist in 2004.

== Political career ==
He was advised to join the Bharatiya Janata Party by former Prime Minister A. B. Vajpayee during a meeting. He served as the state president of the party's youth wing: the Bharatiya Janata Yuva Morcha (BJYM). In 2014 assembly elections he defeated Jammu and Kashmir People's Democratic Party candidate Surinder Kumar Choudhary by 9,503 votes from the Nowshera Assembly constituency. During the budget session in early 2018, Raina led his party colleagues several times in shouting anti-Pakistan slogans in the Assembly to protest against the frequent ceasefire violations by the neighbouring country along the Line of Control (LoC). He failed in his bid for re-election to the Jammu and Kashmir Legislative Assembly in the 2024 assembly elections, being beaten by Surinder Kumar Choudhary, a candidate from the Jammu and Kashmir National Conference, by 7,819 votes in the Nowshera Assembly constituency.

=== Controversy ===
Raina courted controversy in 2015 when he took oath as MLA in Jammu and Kashmir Legislative Assembly in the name of "Mata Vaishno Devi". Members of opposition registered their objection by saying that there is no provision for a member of the legislative house to take oath in the name of "Mata Vaishno Devi". Pro tem Speaker Mohmmad Shafi had to intervene in the matter and later he asked Raina to take oath in the name of God.
