= Sat Paul Sharma =

Indian politician

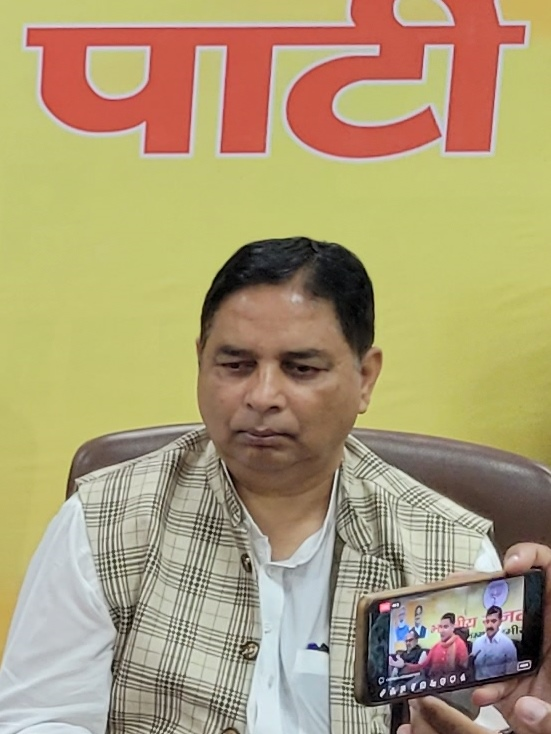
- Sat Paul Sharma at press conference at BJP Office, Jammu.

Member of Parliament, Rajya Sabha
- Incumbent
- Assumed office 24 October 2025
- Preceded by: Shamsheer Singh Manhas
- Constituency: Jammu and Kashmir

President of Bharatiya Janata Party, Jammu and Kashmir
- Incumbent
- Assumed office 3 November 2024
- Preceded by: Ravinder Raina
- In office 2015 – 12 May 2018
- Succeeded by: Ravinder Raina

Cabinet Minister of Jammu and Kashmir
- In office 30 April 2018 – 19 June 2018
- Governor: Narinder Nath Vohra
- Chief Minister: Mehbooba Mufti
- Constituency: Jammu West

Member of Jammu and Kashmir Legislative Assembly
- In office 23 December 2014 – 2018
- Governor: Narinder Nath Vohra
- Chief Minister: Mehbooba Mufti
- Preceded by: Chaman Lal Gupta
- Succeeded by: Arvind Gupta
- Constituency: Jammu West

Personal details
- Born: Jammu, Jammu and Kashmir, India
- Party: Bharatiya Janata Party
- Occupation: Politician

Sat Sharma (Sat Paul Sharma) is an Indian politician from Jammu and Kashmir. He is currently serving as a member of Rajya Sabha representing Jammu and Kashmir as a member of the Bharatiya Janata Party. He is the current state president of BJP Jammu and Kashmir. He previously served as the state president Jammu and Kashmir from 2015 to 12 May 2018. He was a member of the Jammu and Kashmir Legislative Assembly representing Bharatiya Janata Party

== Early life and education ==
Sharma was born in a Dogra Brahmin family in Jammu. His father is Gian Chand Sharma. He completed B.Sc. in 1981 at G.G.M. Science College which is affiliated with University of Jammu. He is a Chartered Accountant and became a fellow of Institute of Chartered Accountants of India in 1986.

== Career ==
Sharma won election from Jammu West Assembly constituency representing BJP in the 2014 Jammu and Kashmir Legislative Assembly election. He also served as cabinet minister of J&K for Housing and Development for 50 days. In 2025 Rajya Sabha elections, he was elected as a BJP candidate from Jammu and Kashmir. He took oath as Rajya Sabha MP on 6 November

== Electoral performance ==
Election	Constituency	Party	Result	Votes %	Opposition Candidate	Opposition Party	Opposition vote %	Ref
2014	Jammu West	BJP	Won	70.63%	Surinder Singh Shingari	INC	19.27%	

=== Rajya Sabha ===
Position	Party	Constituency	From	To	Tenure
Member of Parliament, Rajya Sabha	BJP	Jammu & Kashmir	24 October 2025	Incumbent	358 days
