= Parcham Party of India =

- President: Nazim Ilahi
- Founder: Late. Saleem Peerzada
- Founded: 13 April 2003 (23 years ago)
- ECI status: Registered

Website
- parchampartyofindia.org

PPI logo

The Parcham Party of India (Abbr : PPI) is an Indian political party based primarily in the Uttar Pradesh and Bihar. It was founded by the Indian Muslim Political Conference on 13 April 2003 at an "Azm-e-millat" convention in Aligarh. It was an ally in the Uttar Pradesh Ittehad Front founded in 2015.

== Origins ==
Parcham Party of India founded in 13 April 2003. Parcham Party founded by Late Saleem Peerzada, popularly known by the name of Lovey Bhai or Lovey Peerzada and other students of Aligarh Muslim University. The founder was the activist of the Aligarh Movement in its sense.

== History ==
=== 2007 UP Assembly Election ===
PPI participated in the Uttar Pradesh 2007 Assembly election was in the alliance with Vishwanath Pratap Singh's Jan Morcha and contested on 5 seats.

=== 2009 UP By-election ===
The PPI supported Samajwadi Party in the by-election.
