= Basohli Assembly constituency =

Constituency of the Jammu and Kashmir legislative assembly in India

Coordinates: 32.501°N 75.812°E

Basohli
- Constituency No. 65 for the Jammu and Kashmir Legislative Assembly

Constituency details
- Country: India
- State: Jammu and Kashmir
- District: Kathua
- Lok Sabha constituency: Udhampur
- Established: 1962

Member of Legislative Assembly
- Incumbent Darshan Kumar
- Party: BJP
- Alliance: NDA
- Elected year: 2024

Basohli Assembly constituency is one of the 90 constituencies in the Jammu and Kashmir Legislative Assembly of Jammu and Kashmir a north state of India. Basohli is also part of Udhampur Lok Sabha constituency.

== Members of the Legislative Assembly ==
Election	Member	Party
1962	Mangat Ram Sharma	Jammu & Kashmir National Conference
1967	Mangat Ram Sharma	Indian National Congress
1972	Mangat Ram Sharma	Indian National Congress
1977	Mangat Ram Sharma	Indian National Congress
1983	Mangat Ram Sharma	Indian National Congress
1987	Jagdish Raj Sapolia	Indian National Congress
1996	Chaudhary Lal Singh	All India Indira Congress
2002	Chaudhary Lal Singh	Indian National Congress
2004 By-election	Kanta Andotra	Indian National Congress
2008	Jagdish Raj Sapolia	Bharatiya Janata Party
2014	Chaudhary Lal Singh	Bharatiya Janata Party
2024	Darshan Kumar	Bharatiya Janata Party

== Election results ==
=== Assembly Election 2024 ===
2024 Jammu and Kashmir Legislative Assembly election : Basohli
Party	Candidate	Votes	%	±%
BJP	Darshan Kumar	31,874	65.38%	▲12.31
INC	Chaudhary Lal Singh	15,840	32.49%	▲16.81
BSP	Pankaj Kumar	421	0.86%	New
JKPDP	Yoginder Singh	368	0.75%	▼0.14
NOTA	None of the Above	246	0.50%	▼0.32
Margin of victory		16,034	32.89%	▲1.20
Turnout		48,749	70.36%	▼3.33
Registered electors		69,282		▼9.09
BJP hold		Swing	▲12.31	

=== Assembly Election 2014 ===
2014 Jammu and Kashmir Legislative Assembly election : Basohli
Party	Candidate	Votes	%	±%
BJP	Chaudhary Lal Singh	29,808	53.07%	▲17.82
JKNC	Davinder Singh	12,007	21.38%	▼7.77
INC	Jagdish Raj Sapolia	8,809	15.68%	▼13.27
Independent	Rajinder Singh	2,550	4.54%	New
Independent	Darshan Kumar	508	0.90%	New
JKPDP	Rangil Singh	502	0.89%	▼1.16
NOTA	None of the Above	462	0.82%	New
JKNPP	Romesh Chander Gupta	431	0.77%	New
Independent	Parvez Ahmed Reza	360	0.64%	New
Margin of victory		17,801	31.70%	▲25.60
Turnout		56,163	73.70%	▲3.89
Registered electors		76,209		▲12.62
BJP hold		Swing	▲17.82	

=== Assembly Election 2008 ===
2008 Jammu and Kashmir Legislative Assembly election : Basohli
Party	Candidate	Votes	%	±%
BJP	Jagdish Raj Sapolia	16,651	35.25%	▲0.40
JKNC	Davinder Singh	13,770	29.15%	▲14.65
INC	Kanta Andotra	13,678	28.96%	▼14.69
JKPDP	Karpal Singh	969	2.05%	New
BSP	Romesh Chander	692	1.47%	▼0.33
LJP	Vinod Kumar	625	1.32%	New
Independent	Angrazo Ram	350	0.74%	New
Independent	Suraj Singh	316	0.67%	New
Margin of victory		2,881	6.10%	▼2.69
Turnout		47,235	69.80%	▲10.04
Registered electors		67,669		▼5.90
BJP gain from INC		Swing	▼8.40	

=== Assembly By-election 2004 ===
2004 Jammu and Kashmir Legislative Assembly by-election : Basohli
Party	Candidate	Votes	%	±%
INC	Kanta Andotra	18,759	43.65%	▲0.04
BJP	Jagdish Raj Sapolia	14,980	34.86%	▼0.29
JKNC	Raj Singh	6,231	14.50%	▼0.15
BSP	Mushtaq Ahmed	773	1.80%	▲0.45
JKNPP	Kartar Singh	505	1.18%	▲0.11
Independent	Ajit Singh	418	0.97%	New
Independent	Khadam Hussian	387	0.90%	New
SP	Surinder Singh	353	0.82%	New
Independent	Ghulam Ali	282	0.66%	New
Margin of victory		3,779	8.79%	▲0.34
Turnout		42,977	59.76%	▼3.37
Registered electors		71,915		▲4.66
INC hold		Swing	▲0.04	

=== Assembly Election 2002 ===
2002 Jammu and Kashmir Legislative Assembly election : Basohli
Party	Candidate	Votes	%	±%
INC	Chaudhary Lal Singh	18,916	43.61%	▲18.55
BJP	Jagdish Raj Sapolia	15,248	35.15%	▲24.57
JKNC	Raj Singh	6,356	14.65%	▲11.83
Independent	Nisar Ahmed Ansari	887	2.04%	New
BSP	Sudershan Kumar Chouhan	584	1.35%	▼4.76
JKNPP	Kartar Singh	462	1.07%	New
SS	Anil Sharma	458	1.06%	New
Independent	Angrazo Ram	282	0.65%	New
Margin of victory		3,668	8.46%	▼4.93
Turnout		43,380	63.15%	▲0.10
Registered electors		68,710		▲37.15
INC gain from AIIC(T)		Swing	▲5.16	

=== Assembly Election 1996 ===
1996 Jammu and Kashmir Legislative Assembly election : Basohli
Party	Candidate	Votes	%	±%
AIIC(T)	Chaudhary Lal Singh	12,140	38.44%	New
INC	Jagdish Raj S/O Tula Ram	7,912	25.05%	▼15.64
Independent	Darshan Kumar	4,882	15.46%	New
BJP	Ravinder Kumar	3,340	10.58%	▼1.56
BSP	Jagdish Raj S/O Chandu Lal	1,929	6.11%	New
JKNC	Amreesh Kumar	891	2.82%	New
JD	Kartar Singh	359	1.14%	New
Margin of victory		4,228	13.39%	▲8.83
Turnout		31,580	63.60%	▲2.21
Registered electors		50,098		▲9.53
AIIC(T) gain from INC		Swing	▼2.25	

=== Assembly Election 1987 ===
1987 Jammu and Kashmir Legislative Assembly election : Basohli
Party	Candidate	Votes	%	±%
INC	Jagdish Raj Sapolia	11,322	40.69%	▼12.72
Independent	Lal Chand	10,054	36.14%	New
BJP	Ravinder Kumar	3,378	12.14%	▲4.68
Independent	Surinder Kumar Abrol	983	3.53%	New
Independent	Karnail Singh	796	2.86%	New
JKNPP	Rajinder Parshad	540	1.94%	New
Independent	Suraj Singh	392	1.41%	New
Independent	Sansar Chand	358	1.29%	New
Margin of victory		1,268	4.56%	▼14.80
Turnout		27,823	61.64%	▼1.57
Registered electors		45,740		▲8.75
INC hold		Swing	▼12.72	

=== Assembly Election 1983 ===
1983 Jammu and Kashmir Legislative Assembly election : Basohli
Party	Candidate	Votes	%	±%
INC	Mangat Ram Sharma	14,019	53.42%	▲23.46
JKNC	Darshan Kumar Sharma	8,939	34.06%	▲18.80
BJP	Parkash Rani	1,958	7.46%	New
Independent	Tara Chand	426	1.62%	New
Independent	Mani Ram	296	1.13%	New
Independent	Harnam Singh	232	0.88%	New
Independent	Jagan Nath	203	0.77%	New
Margin of victory		5,080	19.36%	▲13.50
Turnout		26,245	63.38%	▲17.93
Registered electors		42,060		▲16.05
INC hold		Swing	▲23.46	

=== Assembly Election 1977 ===
1977 Jammu and Kashmir Legislative Assembly election : Basohli
Party	Candidate	Votes	%	±%
INC	Mangat Ram Sharma	4,829	29.96%	▼26.47
Independent	Uttam Chand	3,885	24.10%	New
JKNC	Surinder Kumar	2,459	15.26%	New
JP	Parkash Rani	2,167	13.44%	New
Independent	Ram Chand	908	5.63%	New
Independent	Tara Chand Padha	907	5.63%	New
Independent	Darshan Kumar Sharma	619	3.84%	New
Independent	Natnu Ram	236	1.46%	New
Independent	Tara Chand Sharma	108	0.67%	New
Margin of victory		944	5.86%	▼15.63
Turnout		16,118	45.32%	▼12.27
Registered electors		36,244		▲22.38
INC hold		Swing	▼26.47	

=== Assembly Election 1972 ===
1972 Jammu and Kashmir Legislative Assembly election : Basohli
Party	Candidate	Votes	%	±%
INC	Mangat Ram Sharma	9,482	56.43%	▲3.18
ABJS	Baldev Singh	5,871	34.94%	▲7.15
Independent	Major Durga Dass	1,290	7.68%	New
Independent	Mahesh Chand	161	0.96%	New
Margin of victory		3,611	21.49%	▼3.97
Turnout		16,804	58.32%	▲3.05
Registered electors		29,616		▲8.48
INC hold		Swing	▲3.18	

=== Assembly Election 1967 ===
1967 Jammu and Kashmir Legislative Assembly election : Basohli
Party	Candidate	Votes	%	±%
INC	Mangat Ram Sharma	7,805	53.25%	New
ABJS	U. Chand	4,073	27.79%	New
Independent	B. Dass	1,779	12.14%	New
JKNC	R. Krishan	833	5.68%	▼53.43
Independent	Mahesh Chand	167	1.14%	New
Margin of victory		3,732	25.46%	▲2.00
Turnout		14,657	56.14%	▲2.43
Registered electors		27,300		▲11.86
INC gain from JKNC		Swing	▼5.86	

=== Assembly Election 1962 ===
1962 Jammu and Kashmir Legislative Assembly election : Basohli
Party	Candidate	Votes	%	±%
JKNC	Mangat Ram Sharma	7,394	59.11%	New
JPP	Uttam Chand	4,459	35.65%	New
Democratic National Conference	Ram Krishan	656	5.24%	New
Margin of victory		2,935	23.46%	
Turnout		12,509	51.27%	
Registered electors		24,406		
JKNC win (new seat)				

== See also ==
- Basohli
- List of constituencies of Jammu and Kashmir Legislative Assembly
