= Udhampur East Assembly constituency =

Constituency of the Jammu and Kashmir legislative assembly in India

Udhampur East
- Constituency No. 60 for the Jammu and Kashmir Legislative Assembly

Constituency details
- Country: India
- State: Jammu and Kashmir
- District: Udhampur
- Lok Sabha constituency: Udhampur
- Established: 2022
- Reservation: None

Member of Legislative Assembly
- Incumbent Ranbir Singh Pathania
- Party: BJP
- Alliance: NDA
- Elected year: 2024

Udhampur East Assembly constituency is one of the 90 constituencies in the Jammu and Kashmir Legislative Assembly of Jammu and Kashmir a north state of India. Udhampur is also part of Udhampur Lok Sabha constituency.

== Members of Legislative Assembly ==
Year	Member	Party
2024	Ranbir Singh Pathania	Bharatiya Janata Party

== Election results ==
=== Assembly Election 2024 ===
2024 Jammu and Kashmir Legislative Assembly election : Udhampur East
Party	Candidate	Votes	%	±%
BJP	Ranbir Singh Pathania	32,996	41.64%	New
Independent	Pawan Khajuria	30,647	38.67%	New
JKNPP	Balwan Singh	8,427	10.63%	New
JKNC	Sunil Verma	4,495	5.67%	New
Independent	Soma	740	0.93%	New
BSP	Achhav Singh	591	0.75%	New
NOTA	None of the Above	591	0.75%	New
Margin of victory		2,349	2.96%	
Turnout		79,246	78.70%	
Registered electors		1,00,690		
BJP win (new seat)				

== See also ==
- List of constituencies of the Jammu and Kashmir Legislative Assembly
