= Hiranagar Assembly constituency =

Constituency of the Jammu and Kashmir legislative assembly in India

Coordinates: 32.486°N 75.277°E

Hiranagar
- Constituency No. 68 for the Jammu and Kashmir Legislative Assembly

Constituency details
- Country: India
- State: Jammu and Kashmir
- District: Kathua
- Lok Sabha constituency: Udhampur
- Established: 1977

Member of Legislative Assembly
- Incumbent Vijay Kumar Sharma
- Party: BJP
- Alliance: NDA
- Elected year: 2024

Hiranagar Assembly constituency is one of the 90 constituencies in the Jammu and Kashmir Legislative Assembly of Jammu and Kashmir a north Indian union territory. Hiranagar is also part of Jammu Lok Sabha constituency.

== Members of the Legislative Assembly ==
Election	Member	Party
1977	Girdhari Lal Dogra	Indian National Congress
1983	Ram Dass	Indian National Congress
1987	Thakur Baldev Singh	Bharatiya Janata Party
1996	Prem Lal	Bharatiya Janata Party
2002	Girdhari Lal	Indian National Congress
2008	Durga Dass	Bharatiya Janata Party
2014	Kuldeep Raj	Bharatiya Janata Party
2024	Vijay Kumar	Bharatiya Janata Party

== Election results ==
=== Assembly Election 2024 ===
2024 Jammu and Kashmir Legislative Assembly election : Hiranagar
Party	Candidate	Votes	%	±%
BJP	Vijay Kumar	36,737	54.75%	▼14.40
INC	Rakesh Kumar	28,127	41.92%	▲21.80
BSP	Balbir Singh	1,015	1.51%	▼0.88
ASP(KR)	Gaurav Kumar	506	0.75%	New
NOTA	None of the Above	321	0.48%	▼0.06
Margin of victory		8,610	12.83%	▼36.20
Turnout		67,102	76.31%	▲3.97
Registered electors		87,939		▼20.60
BJP hold		Swing	▼14.40	

=== Assembly Election 2014 ===
2014 Jammu and Kashmir Legislative Assembly election : Hiranagar
Party	Candidate	Votes	%	±%
BJP	Kuldeep Raj	55,399	69.15%	▲38.64
INC	Girdhari Lal Chalotra	16,115	20.11%	▼1.71
Independent	Bansi Lal Kandley	3,158	3.94%	New
BSP	Puran Chand	1,917	2.39%	▼0.90
JKNC	Chandu Ram	1,057	1.32%	▼4.35
JKPDP	Suraj Parkash	992	1.24%	New
Independent	Ravail Singh	639	0.80%	New
NOTA	None of the Above	434	0.54%	New
Margin of victory		39,284	49.03%	▲44.80
Turnout		80,118	72.34%	▲6.31
Registered electors		1,10,753		▲13.07
BJP hold		Swing	▲38.64	

=== Assembly Election 2008 ===
2008 Jammu and Kashmir Legislative Assembly election : Hiranagar
Party	Candidate	Votes	%	±%
BJP	Durga Dass	19,730	30.50%	▲7.45
Independent	Prem Lal	16,993	26.27%	New
INC	Girdhari Lal	14,113	21.82%	▼33.06
JKNC	Dharam Paul	3,670	5.67%	▼5.25
Independent	Tara Chand	2,745	4.24%	New
BSP	Rano Devi	2,131	3.29%	▼1.27
Independent	Bansi Lal Kandley	1,613	2.49%	New
Margin of victory		2,737	4.23%	▼27.60
Turnout		64,680	66.03%	▲5.92
Registered electors		97,950		▲2.92
BJP gain from INC		Swing	▼24.38	

=== Assembly Election 2002 ===
2002 Jammu and Kashmir Legislative Assembly election : Hiranagar
Party	Candidate	Votes	%	±%
INC	Girdhari Lal	31,402	54.88%	▲24.11
BJP	Gopal Dass	13,190	23.05%	▼12.90
JKNC	Prem Lal	6,251	10.93%	▲6.59
BSP	Dhian Chand	2,609	4.56%	▼8.18
SS	Sagar Mal	1,482	2.59%	New
CPI	Mohinder Paul	826	1.44%	New
JKNPP	Hans Raj	641	1.12%	▲0.45
Margin of victory		18,212	31.83%	▲26.66
Turnout		57,215	60.12%	▼0.01
Registered electors		95,173		▲29.20
INC gain from BJP		Swing	▲18.93	

=== Assembly Election 1996 ===
1996 Jammu and Kashmir Legislative Assembly election : Hiranagar
Party	Candidate	Votes	%	±%
BJP	Prem Lal	15,922	35.95%	▼9.22
INC	Girdhari Lal	13,630	30.77%	▼7.76
Independent	Gopal Dass	6,878	15.53%	New
BSP	Hans Raj	5,641	12.74%	New
JKNC	Nand Lal	1,920	4.34%	New
JKNPP	Ashok Kumar	299	0.68%	▼0.21
Margin of victory		2,292	5.17%	▼1.45
Turnout		44,290	60.75%	▼10.91
Registered electors		73,663		▲38.32
BJP hold		Swing	▼9.22	

=== Assembly Election 1987 ===
1987 Jammu and Kashmir Legislative Assembly election : Hiranagar
Party	Candidate	Votes	%	±%
BJP	Thakur Baldev Singh	17,088	45.17%	▲15.61
INC	Ram Das Dogra	14,580	38.54%	▼1.37
Independent	Nek Ram	3,999	10.57%	New
Independent	Vijay	661	1.75%	New
JP	Ganesh Dass	489	1.29%	New
JKNPP	Balwant Rai Sharma	334	0.88%	New
LKD	Lakshmi Kantalias Sethi	298	0.79%	New
Margin of victory		2,508	6.63%	▼3.73
Turnout		37,833	71.97%	▲4.10
Registered electors		53,257		▲7.64
BJP gain from INC		Swing	▲5.26	

=== Assembly Election 1983 ===
1983 Jammu and Kashmir Legislative Assembly election : Hiranagar
Party	Candidate	Votes	%	±%
INC	Ram Dass	13,218	39.91%	▼10.48
BJP	Thakur Baldev Singh	9,788	29.55%	New
Independent	Nek Ram	3,169	9.57%	New
Independent	Subhash Chander	2,491	7.52%	New
JKNC	Inderjit Sharma	2,413	7.29%	▲1.17
Independent	Gopal Dass Sharma	548	1.65%	New
Independent	Kamal Kumar Dubey	410	1.24%	New
Margin of victory		3,430	10.36%	▼3.37
Turnout		33,119	68.69%	▼1.53
Registered electors		49,475		▲25.31
INC hold		Swing	▼10.48	

=== Assembly Election 1977 ===
1977 Jammu and Kashmir Legislative Assembly election : Hiranagar
Party	Candidate	Votes	%	±%
INC	Girdhari Lal Dogra	13,623	50.39%	New
JP	Rattan Lal	9,912	36.66%	New
JKNC	Major Piar Singh	1,653	6.11%	New
Independent	Yash Paul	1,099	4.07%	New
Independent	Gopal Dass	376	1.39%	New
Independent	Krishan Dutta	372	1.38%	New
Margin of victory		3,711	13.73%	
Turnout		27,035	69.54%	
Registered electors		39,483		
INC win (new seat)				

== See also ==
- Hiranagar
- Kathua district
- List of constituencies of Jammu and Kashmir Legislative Assembly
