= Ramnagar, Jammu and Kashmir Assembly constituency =

Constituency of the Jammu and Kashmir legislative assembly in India

Coordinates: 32.81°N 75.31°E

Ramnagar
- Constituency No. 62 for the Jammu and Kashmir Legislative Assembly

Constituency details
- Country: India
- State: Jammu and Kashmir
- District: Udhampur
- Lok Sabha constituency: Udhampur
- Established: 1962
- Reservation: SC

Member of Legislative Assembly
- Incumbent Sunil Bhardwaj
- Party: BJP
- Alliance: NDA
- Elected year: 2024

Ramnagar Assembly constituency is one of the 90 constituencies in the Jammu and Kashmir Legislative Assembly of Jammu and Kashmir a north state of India. Ramnagar is also part of Udhampur Lok Sabha constituency.

== Members of the Legislative Assembly ==
Election	Member	Party
1962	Hem Raj	Jammu & Kashmir National Conference
1967	Chandhu Lal	Indian National Congress
1972	Chandhu Lal	Indian National Congress
1977	Prithvi Chand	Janata Party
1983	Ram Dass	Indian National Congress
1987	Chandhu Lal	Indian National Congress
1996	Harsh Dev Singh	Jammu and Kashmir National Panthers Party
2002	Harsh Dev Singh	Jammu and Kashmir National Panthers Party
2008	Harsh Dev Singh	Jammu and Kashmir National Panthers Party
2014	Ranbir Singh Pathania	Bharatiya Janata Party
2024	Sunil Bhardwaj	Bharatiya Janata Party

== Election results ==
=== Assembly Election 2024 ===
2024 Jammu and Kashmir Legislative Assembly election : Ramnagar
Party	Candidate	Votes	%	±%
BJP	Sunil Bhardwaj	34,550	48.50%	▼7.21
JKNPP	Ashri Devi	25,244	35.44%	▲0.88
INC	Mool Raj	7,800	10.95%	▲9.27
BSP	Herjeet	809	1.14%	▼0.59
SS(UBT)	Raj Singh	714	1.00%	New
Jammu and Kashmir National Panthers Party (Bhim)	Sanju Kumar	486	0.68%	New
DPAP	Sandeep Kumar Sarmal	463	0.65%	New
NOTA	None of the Above	1,167	1.64%	▲0.37
Margin of victory		9,306	13.06%	▼8.08
Turnout		71,233	80.40%	▲4.97
Registered electors		88,597		▼18.87
BJP hold		Swing	▼7.21	

=== Assembly Election 2014 ===
2014 Jammu and Kashmir Legislative Assembly election : Ramnagar
Party	Candidate	Votes	%	±%
BJP	Ranbir Singh Pathania	45,891	55.71%	▲54.43
JKNPP	Harsh Dev Singh	28,471	34.56%	▼12.62
JKNC	Raj Kapoor	3,073	3.73%	New
BSP	Sukham Chand	1,424	1.73%	▼26.73
INC	Vinod Kumar Sharma	1,384	1.68%	▼0.62
Independent	Sanju Kumar	1,086	1.32%	New
NOTA	None of the Above	1,048	1.27%	New
Margin of victory		17,420	21.15%	▲2.42
Turnout		82,377	75.43%	▲10.89
Registered electors		1,09,209		▲8.65
BJP gain from JKNPP		Swing	▲8.52	

=== Assembly Election 2008 ===
2008 Jammu and Kashmir Legislative Assembly election : Ramnagar
Party	Candidate	Votes	%	±%
JKNPP	Harsh Dev Singh	30,609	47.18%	▼3.21
BSP	Vinod Khajuria	18,463	28.46%	▲5.83
Independent	Ranbir Singh Pathania	9,285	14.31%	New
INC	Thakar Dass	1,491	2.30%	▼7.45
Independent	Mansa Ram	1,002	1.54%	New
Independent	Suram Chand Khajuria	886	1.37%	New
BJP	Rakesh Chand	828	1.28%	▼0.35
Margin of victory		12,146	18.72%	▼9.05
Turnout		64,871	64.54%	▲3.84
Registered electors		1,00,517		▲2.79
JKNPP hold		Swing	▼3.21	

=== Assembly Election 2002 ===
2002 Jammu and Kashmir Legislative Assembly election : Ramnagar
Party	Candidate	Votes	%	±%
JKNPP	Harsh Dev Singh	29,914	50.40%	▲25.84
BSP	Khalil Allaha Qazi	13,430	22.63%	▼0.30
JKNC	Subhash Chander	7,715	13.00%	New
INC	Bupinder Singh	5,788	9.75%	▼12.16
BJP	Gopal Dass	966	1.63%	▼18.02
NCP	Mohinder Singh	660	1.11%	New
Margin of victory		16,484	27.77%	▲26.14
Turnout		59,354	60.72%	▲7.62
Registered electors		97,787		▲40.88
JKNPP hold		Swing	▲25.84	

=== Assembly Election 1996 ===
1996 Jammu and Kashmir Legislative Assembly election : Ramnagar
Party	Candidate	Votes	%	±%
JKNPP	Harsh Dev Singh	9,049	24.56%	▼3.39
BSP	Khalil-Allah	8,448	22.93%	New
INC	Bhupinder Singh	8,071	21.91%	▼36.86
BJP	Mohan Lal	7,238	19.65%	▲8.91
JD	Dev Datt	2,783	7.55%	New
Independent	Subhash Chander	821	2.23%	New
JKAL	Nirmal Chander	240	0.65%	New
Margin of victory		601	1.63%	▼29.18
Turnout		36,840	53.75%	▲2.73
Registered electors		69,413		▲43.51
JKNPP gain from INC		Swing	▼34.20	

=== Assembly Election 1987 ===
1987 Jammu and Kashmir Legislative Assembly election : Ramnagar
Party	Candidate	Votes	%	±%
INC	Chandhu Lal	14,311	58.77%	▲2.77
JKNPP	Girdhari Lal	6,807	27.95%	New
BJP	Prithvi Chand	2,615	10.74%	▲3.74
LKD	Kesru Ram	416	1.71%	New
Independent	Bhagat Ram	203	0.83%	New
Margin of victory		7,504	30.81%	▼3.26
Turnout		24,352	51.01%	▼4.11
Registered electors		48,369		▲15.88
INC hold		Swing	▲2.77	

=== Assembly Election 1983 ===
1983 Jammu and Kashmir Legislative Assembly election : Ramnagar
Party	Candidate	Votes	%	±%
INC	Ram Dass	12,729	56.00%	▲26.34
JKNC	Charan Dass	4,983	21.92%	▲4.78
Independent	Narayan Chand	3,428	15.08%	New
BJP	Prithvi Chand	1,591	7.00%	New
Margin of victory		7,746	34.08%	▲10.55
Turnout		22,731	55.29%	▲17.15
Registered electors		41,740		▲13.46
INC gain from JP		Swing	▲2.81	

=== Assembly Election 1977 ===
1977 Jammu and Kashmir Legislative Assembly election : Ramnagar
Party	Candidate	Votes	%	±%
JP	Prithvi Chand	7,300	53.19%	New
INC	Ram Dass	4,071	29.66%	▼34.42
JKNC	Charan Dass	2,353	17.15%	New
Margin of victory		3,229	23.53%	▼8.74
Turnout		13,724	38.08%	▼12.68
Registered electors		36,787		▲7.48
JP gain from INC		Swing		

=== Assembly Election 1972 ===
1972 Jammu and Kashmir Legislative Assembly election : Ramnagar
Party	Candidate	Votes	%	±%
INC	Chandhu Lal	10,963	64.08%	▲2.39
ABJS	Amar Nath	5,442	31.81%	▲2.85
Independent	Chhunku Ram	426	2.49%	New
INC(O)	Daya Ram	277	1.62%	New
Margin of victory		5,521	32.27%	▼0.46
Turnout		17,108	51.05%	▼4.85
Registered electors		34,228		▲8.34
INC hold		Swing	▲2.39	

=== Assembly Election 1967 ===
1967 Jammu and Kashmir Legislative Assembly election : Ramnagar
Party	Candidate	Votes	%	±%
INC	Chandhu Lal	10,687	61.70%	New
ABJS	Ram Dass	5,017	28.96%	New
Democratic National Conference	D. Chand	1,146	6.62%	▲4.05
Independent	T. Ram	472	2.72%	New
Margin of victory		5,670	32.73%	▲2.65
Turnout		17,322	56.54%	▼13.26
Registered electors		31,592		▲15.50
INC gain from JKNC		Swing	▼1.02	

=== Assembly Election 1962 ===
1962 Jammu and Kashmir Legislative Assembly election : Ramnagar
Party	Candidate	Votes	%	±%
JKNC	Hem Raj	11,680	62.71%	New
JPP	Hans Raj	6,077	32.63%	New
Democratic National Conference	Thakar Dass	477	2.56%	New
Harijan Mandal	Beli Ram	279	1.50%	New
Independent	Amar Chand	111	0.60%	New
Margin of victory		5,603	30.08%	
Turnout		18,624	69.24%	
Registered electors		27,353		
JKNC win (new seat)				

== See also ==
- Ramnagar
- Udhampur district
- List of constituencies of Jammu and Kashmir Legislative Assembly
