= Jammu West Assembly constituency =

Constituency of the Jammu and Kashmir legislative assembly in India

Coordinates: 32.76°N 74.79°E

Jammu West
- Constituency No. 78 for the Jammu and Kashmir Legislative Assembly

Constituency details
- Country: India
- Region: North India
- Union Territory: Jammu and Kashmir
- District: Jammu
- Lok Sabha constituency: Jammu
- Established: 2008

Member of Legislative Assembly
- 13th Jammu and Kashmir Legislative Assembly
- Incumbent Arvind Gupta
- Party: BJP
- Alliance: NDA
- Elected year: 2024

Jammu West Assembly constituency is one of the 90 constituencies in the Jammu and Kashmir Legislative Assembly. It comprises parts of Jammu tehsil and Jammu West tehsil, both in Jammu district. As of 2024, its representative is Arvind Gupta of the Bharatiya Janata Party.

== Members of the Legislative Assembly ==
Election	Member	Party
1977	Harbans Lal Bhagotra	Janata Party
1983	Rangil Singh	Indian National Congress
1987	Mangat Ram Sharma	Indian National Congress
1996	Hans Raj	Bharatiya Janata Party
2002	Mangat Ram Sharma	Indian National Congress
2008	Chaman Lal Gupta	Bharatiya Janata Party
2014	Sat Paul Sharma	Bharatiya Janata Party
2024	Arvind Gupta	Bharatiya Janata Party

== Election results ==
=== Assembly Election 2024 ===
2024 Jammu and Kashmir Legislative Assembly election : Jammu West
Party	Candidate	Votes	%	±%
BJP	Arvind Gupta	41,963	64.74	▼5.90
INC	Manmohan Singh	19,836	30.60	▲11.33
DPAP	Gourav Chopra	667	1.03	New
NOTA	None of the Above	530	0.82	▲0.45
Independent	Sahil Sharma	479	0.74	New
Margin of victory		22,127	34.14	▼17.23
Turnout		64,820	61.24	▼2.86
Registered electors		1,05,852		▼31.17
BJP hold		Swing	▼5.90	

=== Assembly Election 2014 ===
2014 Jammu and Kashmir Legislative Assembly election : Jammu West
Party	Candidate	Votes	%	±%
BJP	Sat Paul Sharma	69,626	70.63	▲30.38
INC	Surinder Singh Shingari	18,997	19.27	▲3.01
JKNC	Dharamveer Singh	4,733	4.80	▼2.30
JKPDP	Sarv Daman Bhasin	2,419	2.45	New
NOTA	None of the Above	359	0.36	New
Margin of victory		50,629	51.36	▲36.06
Turnout		98,574	64.09	▲3.24
Registered electors		1,53,794		▲9.88
BJP hold		Swing	▲30.38	

=== Assembly Election 2008 ===
2008 Jammu and Kashmir Legislative Assembly election : Jammu West
Party	Candidate	Votes	%	±%
BJP	Chaman Lal Gupta	34,288	40.26	▲37.64
Independent	Surinder Singh Shangari	21,251	24.95	New
INC	Mangat Ram Sharma	13,848	16.26	▼24.21
JKNC	Chander Mohan Sharma	6,050	7.10	▼4.95
BSP	Rattan Lal Chargotra	1,791	2.10	▼2.09
Independent	Ashok Kumar	887	1.04	New
JKNPP	Mohinder Paul Singh	837	0.98	New
CPI	Narinder Kant	658	0.77	New
RPI	Chamupati	585	0.69	New
Margin of victory		13,037	15.31	▲2.80
Turnout		85,174	60.85	▲22.17
Registered electors		1,39,965		▼14.49
BJP gain from INC		Swing	▼0.21	

=== Assembly Election 2002 ===
2002 Jammu and Kashmir Legislative Assembly election : Jammu West
Party	Candidate	Votes	%	±%
INC	Mangat Ram Sharma	25,627	40.47	▲20.04
Independent	Virander Kumar Gupta	17,704	27.96	New
JKNC	Chander Mohan Sharma	7,631	12.05	▼0.68
SS	Anan Sharma	2,822	4.46	New
BSP	Raj Kumar	2,652	4.19	▼9.54
BJP	Kavinder Gupta	1,655	2.61	▼43.05
Independent	Hans Raj Dogra	1,211	1.91	New
Independent	Aslam Shah	830	1.31	New
Independent	Munish Sharma	652	1.03	New
Independent	Joginder Singh	459	0.72	New
BRP	Girdhari Lal	418	0.66	New
Margin of victory		7,923	12.51	▼12.73
Turnout		63,327	38.69	▼4.06
Registered electors		1,63,689		▲41.99
INC gain from BJP		Swing	▼5.20	

=== Assembly Election 1996 ===
1996 Jammu and Kashmir Legislative Assembly election : Jammu West
Party	Candidate	Votes	%	±%
BJP	Hans Raj	22,506	45.67	▲15.04
INC	Yogesh Sawhney	10,068	20.43	▼28.57
BSP	Pawan Kumar	6,767	13.73	New
JKNC	Chander Mohan	6,276	12.73	New
JD	Ayoudhia Kumar	2,123	4.31	New
Independent	Tilak Raj Mahajan	480	0.97	New
JKNPP	Udhay Chand	429	0.87	▼3.86
Independent	Sunil Kumar	315	0.64	New
Margin of victory		12,438	25.24	▲6.87
Turnout		49,283	43.31	▼17.72
Registered electors		1,15,286		▲110.79
BJP gain from INC		Swing	▼3.33	

=== Assembly Election 1987 ===
1987 Jammu and Kashmir Legislative Assembly election : Jammu West
Party	Candidate	Votes	%	±%
INC	Mangat Ram Sharma	16,204	48.99	▼17.38
BJP	Chander Mohan Sharma	10,130	30.63	▲13.39
Independent	Bishwa Nath	3,131	9.47	New
JKNPP	Udhay Chand	1,566	4.73	New
JP	Sham Sunder	585	1.77	New
Independent	Rattan Lal	382	1.16	New
Independent	Vijay Kumar Malhotra	343	1.04	New
Independent	Farrkh Javeed	267	0.81	New
Margin of victory		6,074	18.37	▼30.77
Turnout		33,073	61.52	▲9.91
Registered electors		54,692		▲10.10
INC hold		Swing	▼17.38	

=== Assembly Election 1983 ===
1983 Jammu and Kashmir Legislative Assembly election : Jammu West
Party	Candidate	Votes	%	±%
INC	Rangil Singh	16,672	66.38	▲28.39
BJP	Tilak Raj Sharma	4,331	17.24	New
Independent	Udhey Chand	1,824	7.26	New
JKNC	Sudershan Lal Mahajan	1,210	4.82	▲1.40
Independent	Om Parkash S/O Sh. Beli Ram	309	1.23	New
Independent	Om Parkash S/O Sh. Dhani Ram	264	1.05	New
Independent	Jatinder Paul	225	0.90	New
Margin of victory		12,341	49.13	▲32.35
Turnout		25,117	51.65	▼2.35
Registered electors		49,676		▲31.38
INC gain from JP		Swing	▲11.61	

=== Assembly Election 1977 ===
1977 Jammu and Kashmir Legislative Assembly election : Jammu West
Party	Candidate	Votes	%	±%
JP	Harbans Lal Bhagotra	10,956	54.76	New
INC	Romesh Chander	7,599	37.98	New
JKNC	Rattan Lal Gupta	684	3.42	New
Independent	Som Nath	333	1.66	New
Independent	Master Modh Sharif	267	1.33	New
Margin of victory		3,357	16.78	
Turnout		20,006	53.73	
Registered electors		37,810		
JP win (new seat)				
