= Jagdish Raj Sapolia =

Indian politician (1945/1946–2026)

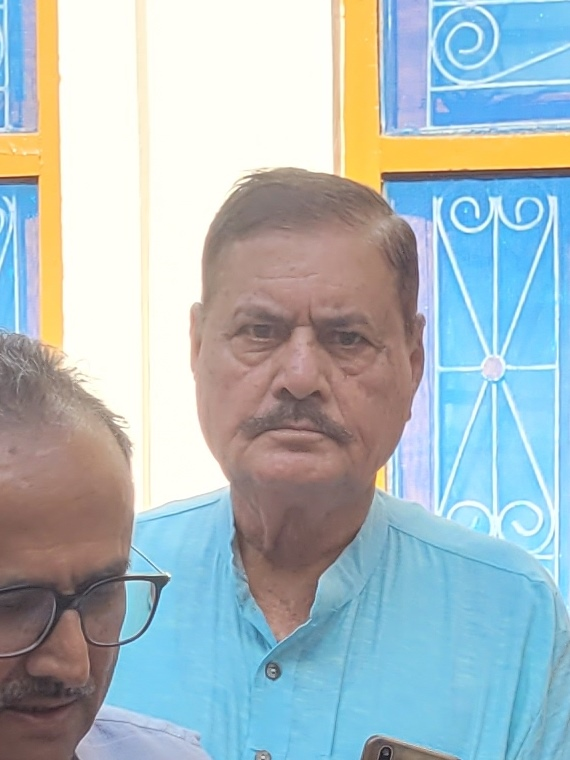
- Jagdish Raj Sapolia

Personal details
- Born: 1945 or 1946
- Died: 2 November 2026 (aged 80) Kathua district, Jammu and Kashmir, India
- Party: Bharatiya Janata Party
- Occupation: Politician

Jagdish Raj Sapolia (1945 or 1946 – 2 November 2026) was an Indian politician. A member of the Indian National Congress, he served in the Jammu and Kashmir Legislative Assembly from the Basohli constituency in Kathua district. Sapolia died on 2 November 2026, aged 80.

== Electoral performance ==
Election	Constituency	Party	Result	Votes %	Opposition Candidate	Opposition Party	Opposition vote %	Ref
2014	Basohli	INC	Lost	15.68%	Lal Singh	BJP	53.07%	
2008	Basohli	BJP	Won	35.25%	Davinder Singh	JKNC	29.15%	
2004 By-election	Basohli	BJP	Lost	34.86%	Kanta Andotra	INC	43.65%	
2002	Basohli	BJP	Lost	35.15%	Lal Singh	INC	43.61%	
1987	Basohli	INC	Won	40.69%	Lal Chand	Independent	36.14%	
