= Chenani Assembly constituency =

Constituency of the Jammu and Kashmir legislative assembly in India

Coordinates: 33.036°N 75.285°E

Chenani
- Constituency No. 61 for the Jammu and Kashmir Legislative Assembly

Constituency details
- Country: India
- State: Jammu and Kashmir
- District: Udhampur
- Lok Sabha constituency: Udhampur
- Established: 2022
- Reservation: None

Member of Legislative Assembly
- Incumbent Balwant Singh Mankotia
- Party: BJP
- Alliance: NDA
- Elected year: 2024

Chenani Assembly constituency is one of the 90 constituencies in the Jammu and Kashmir Legislative Assembly of Jammu and Kashmir a north state of India. Chenani is also part of Udhampur Lok Sabha constituency.

== Members of the Legislative Assembly ==
Election	Member	Party
1977	Bhim Singh	Indian National Congress
1983	Bhim Singh	Independent politician
1987	Yash Paul Khajuria	Indian National Congress
1996	Prithvi Chand	Bharatiya Janata Party
2002	Faquir Nath	Jammu and Kashmir National Panthers Party
2008	Krishan Chander	Indian National Congress
2014	Dina Nath Bhagat	Bharatiya Janata Party
2024	Balwant Singh Mankotia	Bharatiya Janata Party

== Election results ==
=== Assembly Election 2024 ===
2024 Jammu and Kashmir Legislative Assembly election : Chenani
Party	Candidate	Votes	%	±%
BJP	Balwant Singh Mankotia	47,990	56.41%	▲6.24
JKNPP	Harsh Dev Singh	32,379	38.06%	▲19.86
NOTA	None of the Above	1,855	2.18%	▲0.38
Margin of victory		15,611	18.35%	▼12.51
Turnout		85,076	80.51%	▲5.33
Registered electors		1,05,672		▲20.59
BJP hold		Swing	▲6.24	

=== Assembly Election 2014 ===
2014 Jammu and Kashmir Legislative Assembly election : Chenani
Party	Candidate	Votes	%	±%
BJP	Dina Nath Bhagat	33,047	50.17%	▲28.72
INC	Krishan Chander	12,715	19.30%	▼16.17
JKNPP	Dhani Ram Atri	11,992	18.20%	▼1.70
JKPDP	Hans Raj	2,929	4.45%	New
SP	Pushpa Devi	1,830	2.78%	New
JKNC	Sansar Chand	1,198	1.82%	▼9.79
NOTA	None of the Above	1,185	1.80%	New
BSP	Mohinder Kumar	980	1.49%	▼0.88
Margin of victory		20,332	30.86%	▲16.83
Turnout		65,876	75.18%	▲17.80
Registered electors		87,627		▲9.58
BJP gain from INC		Swing	▲14.69	

=== Assembly Election 2008 ===
2008 Jammu and Kashmir Legislative Assembly election : Chenani
Party	Candidate	Votes	%	±%
INC	Krishan Chander	16,276	35.47%	▲1.91
BJP	Dina Nath Bhagat	9,838	21.44%	▲17.70
JKNPP	Faqir Nath	9,131	19.90%	▼17.52
JKNC	Lal Chand	5,325	11.61%	▼8.70
Independent	Sansar Chand	1,705	3.72%	New
BSP	Kapoor Chand	1,086	2.37%	▲0.99
LJP	Krishan Lal	810	1.77%	New
NCP	Ramesh Chander	625	1.36%	New
Independent	Bodh Raj	371	0.81%	New
Independent	Tulsi Dass	287	0.63%	New
Margin of victory		6,438	14.03%	▲10.17
Turnout		45,881	57.37%	▼4.17
Registered electors		79,968		▲7.59
INC gain from JKNPP		Swing	▼1.95	

=== Assembly Election 2002 ===
2002 Jammu and Kashmir Legislative Assembly election : Chenani
Party	Candidate	Votes	%	±%
JKNPP	Faquir Nath	17,118	37.42%	▲34.91
INC	Krishan Chander	15,353	33.56%	▲2.41
JKNC	Lal Chand	9,290	20.31%	New
BJP	Prithvi Chand	1,710	3.74%	▼39.34
JD(S)	Mohan Bodh Raj	1,286	2.81%	New
BSP	Amar Chand	628	1.37%	▼10.68
RJD	Rome Chander	358	0.78%	New
Margin of victory		1,765	3.86%	▼8.06
Turnout		45,743	61.54%	▲14.26
Registered electors		74,330		▲44.28
JKNPP gain from BJP		Swing	▼5.65	

=== Assembly Election 1996 ===
1996 Jammu and Kashmir Legislative Assembly election : Chenani
Party	Candidate	Votes	%	±%
BJP	Prithvi Chand	10,493	43.08%	▲40.19
INC	Krishan Chander	7,589	31.15%	▼24.85
BSP	Dhani Ram	2,935	12.05%	New
JD	Prem Nath Bhagat	1,983	8.14%	New
JKNPP	Darshan Lal	611	2.51%	▼34.48
Independent	Sham Lal	431	1.77%	New
Independent	Paras Ram	181	0.74%	New
Margin of victory		2,904	11.92%	▼7.10
Turnout		24,359	47.88%	▼14.51
Registered electors		51,517		▲12.55
BJP gain from INC		Swing	▼12.93	

=== Assembly Election 1987 ===
1987 Jammu and Kashmir Legislative Assembly election : Chenani
Party	Candidate	Votes	%	±%
INC	Yash Paul Khajuria	15,842	56.01%	▲22.81
JKNPP	Thakur Dass Chanotra	10,462	36.99%	New
BJP	Kedar Nath	817	2.89%	▼0.67
Independent	Budhi Singh	315	1.11%	New
Independent	Nazir Hussain Shah	212	0.75%	New
Independent	Krishan Chander	185	0.65%	New
Independent	Durga Dutt	171	0.60%	New
Margin of victory		5,380	19.02%	▲17.85
Turnout		28,285	62.86%	▲5.09
Registered electors		45,772		▲16.02
INC gain from Independent		Swing	▲21.64	

=== Assembly Election 1983 ===
1983 Jammu and Kashmir Legislative Assembly election : Chenani
Party	Candidate	Votes	%	±%
Independent	Bhim Singh	7,690	34.37%	New
INC	Yash Paul Khajuria	7,428	33.20%	▼19.23
JKNC	Chuni Lal	4,679	20.91%	▲8.92
CPI	Paras Ram	1,211	5.41%	New
BJP	Roshan Lal	795	3.55%	New
Independent	Khalil	396	1.77%	New
Independent	Rattan Singh	173	0.77%	New
Margin of victory		262	1.17%	▼23.90
Turnout		22,372	57.96%	▲12.99
Registered electors		39,453		▲17.85
Independent gain from INC		Swing	▼18.06	

=== Assembly Election 1977 ===
1977 Jammu and Kashmir Legislative Assembly election : Chenani
Party	Candidate	Votes	%	±%
INC	Bhim Singh	7,674	52.43%	New
JP	Ishar Dass	4,005	27.36%	New
JKNC	Chuni Lal	1,755	11.99%	New
Independent	Mohan Lal	242	1.65%	New
Independent	Jia Lal	225	1.54%	New
Independent	Rattan Kumar Sharma	180	1.23%	New
Independent	Gunjar Singh	154	1.05%	New
Independent	Ishari Singh	128	0.87%	New
Margin of victory		3,669	25.07%	
Turnout		14,636	44.98%	
Registered electors		33,477		
INC win (new seat)				

== See also ==
- Udhampur district
- List of constituencies of Jammu and Kashmir Legislative Assembly
