= Surinder Kumar Choudhary =

Indian politician (born 1968)

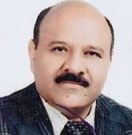
- Formal portrait, 2024

Deputy Chief Minister of Jammu and Kashmir
- Incumbent
- Assumed office 16 October 2024
- Lieutenant Governor: Manoj Sinha
- Chief Minister: Omar Abdullah
- Preceded by: President's rule (Note: Kavinder Gupta was the last officeholder before Choudhary.)
Additional ministries
Incumbent
Assumed office 16 October 2024
Ministry and Departments	Public Works (R&B); Industries; Commerce; Mining; Labour & Employment; Skill Development
Preceded by	President's rule

Member of Jammu and Kashmir Legislative Council
- In office 2015–2019

Member of Jammu and Kashmir Legislative Assembly
- Incumbent
- Assumed office 8 October 2024
- Preceded by: Ravinder Raina
- Constituency: Nowshera

Personal details
- Born: 1968 (age 57–58) Nowshera, Jammu and Kashmir, India
- Party: Jammu and Kashmir National Conference
- Other political affiliations: Bharatiya Janata Party Jammu and Kashmir People's Democratic Party Bahujan Samaj Party
- Profession: Politician

Surinder Kumar Choudhary (born 1968) is an Indian politician, currently serving as the 9th deputy chief minister of the Jammu and Kashmir. He has been a member of the Jammu and Kashmir Legislative Assembly since 8 October 2024, representing the Nowshera assembly constituency as a member of the Jammu & Kashmir National Conference. Choudhary previously served as a member of the Legislative Council (MLC) from the Jammu and Kashmir People's Democratic Party (PDP).

== Career ==
Surinder Kumar Choudhary was born in a Hindu Jatt family in 1968. Before joining politics, Choudhary was an employee of Sher-e-Kashmir University of Agricultural Sciences and Technology of Jammu. He contested his first Assembly election in 2009 from Nowshera as Bahujan Samaj Party candidate. In 2014 elections, he was a Jammu and Kashmir People's Democratic Party candidate for Nowshera assembly constituency and lost to Ravinder Raina of BJP by a margin of 10000 votes. In April 2022, Choudhary resigned from PDP and joined BJP. He was general secretary of PDP at the time of his resignation. Choudhary cited reasons such as "people's love and affection" for delimitation under BJP government which divided Nowshera and Sunderbani into two distinct assembly constituencies. However, he quit BJP to join National Conference in July 2023, accusing Raina of "promoting family" and "corruption".

In 2024 Assembly election, Choudhary contested again from Nowshera as a National Conference candidate and polled a total of 35,069 votes, defeating Ravinder Raina by a margin of 7819 votes.

== Deputy chief minister ==
On 16 October 2024, Choudhary was sworn in as the deputy chief minister of Jammu and Kashmir in a ceremony held at Sher-e-Kashmir International Conference Centre (SKICC). The ceremony was presided over by Lieutenant Governor Manoj Sinha. Choudhary was joined by Sakeena Masood, Javid Ahmad Dar, Javed Ahmed Rana and Satish Sharma on the dais to take the oath of office as ministers. On 18 October 2024, an order was issued by Lieutenant Governor Sinha to allocate portfolios to council of ministers on the advice of chief minister. Choudhary was given the charge of Public Works (R&B), Industries and Commerce, Mining, Labour and Employment, and Skill Development.

== Electoral performance ==
Election	Constituency	Party	Result	Votes %	Opposition Candidate	Opposition Party	Opposition vote %	Ref
2024	Nowshera	JKNC	Won	54.16%	Ravinder Raina	BJP	42.09%	
2014	Nowshera	JKPDP	Lost	36.92%	Ravinder Raina	BJP	49.51%	
2008	Nowshera	BSP	Lost	19.54%	Radhay Sham Sharma	JKNC	26.47%	

== See also ==
- 2024 Jammu and Kashmir Legislative Assembly election
- Jammu and Kashmir Legislative Assembly
