= Ranbir Singh Pathania =

Indian politician

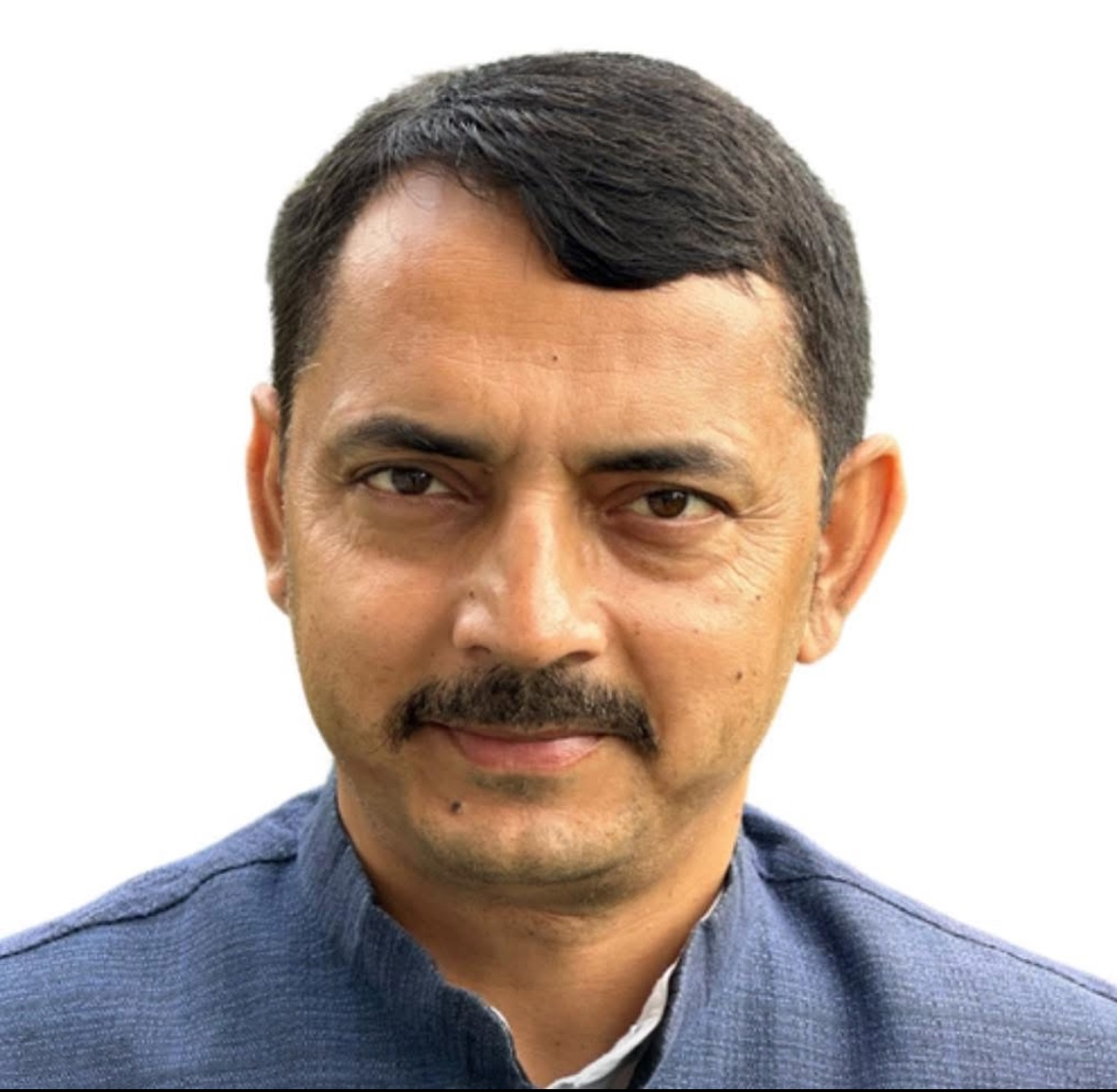
- Ranbir Singh Pathania

Member of Jammu and Kashmir Legislative Assembly
- Incumbent
- Assumed office 8 October 2024
- Preceded by: Newly created constituency
- Constituency: Udhampur East

Spokesperson of Bharatiya Janata Party, Jammu and Kashmir
- Incumbent
- Assumed office 2017

Member of Jammu and Kashmir Legislative Assembly
- In office 23 December 2014 – 21 November 2018
- Preceded by: Harsh Dev Singh
- Succeeded by: Sunil Bhardwaj
- Constituency: Ramnagar

Personal details
- Party: Bharatiya Janata Party
- Spouse: Juhi Manhas
- Profession: Lawyer, Politician

Ranbir Singh Pathania (born 1979) is an Indian politician from Union Territory of Jammu and Kashmir who is a Member of the Jammu and Kashmir Legislative Assembly from the Udhampur East Vidhan Sabha associated with the Bharatiya Janata Party. He was also member of Legislative Assembly of erstwhile State of Jammu and Kashmir from Ramnagar Vidhan Sabha before delimitation of the union territory of Jammu and Kashmir. He is also the Spokesperson of the Party.

== Political career ==
During his first tenure as MLA of Ramnagar, Pathania worked on various infrastructural projects in his constituency. Ramnagar which lacked road connectivity saw various roads and bridges being built during his tenure. Two degree colleges were sanctioned by the Department of Higher Education, Govt of Jammu and Kashmir, due to his efforts. One at Majalta and other at Dudu-Basantgarh. Pathania was adjudged as “Best Legislator for year 2016”. A lawyer turned politician, Pathania was the youngest legislator in the erstwhile State to be awarded with such coveted honour at the time.

On 29 January 2018, Pathania countered the stand of Kashmir-based politicians including the then Chief Minister Mehbooba Mufti and the then leader of the opposition Omar Abdullah over the killings in Ganawpora, Shopian, in which an FIR had been regisatered on Indian Army personnel belonging to Rashtriya Rifles. He demanded the immediate withdrawal of FIR register against the army and ask for governmental inquiry in the matter.

He is known for organising monthly public grievance redressals in his constituency in presence of concerned officers. He has timely raised his voice for the lower allocation of funds regarding welfare of SCs and STs in the budget of J&K, consumer protection law, ration supply, demand for take-over of historic religious shrines of Chountara Mata and Pingla Mata, separate Hill Development Council for under-developed areas, application of Minimum Wages Act, Special Police Officers (SPO), Rehbar-e-Taleem teachers (ReT), daily wagers, contractual workers, transfer policy for ReTs, Shortage of staff in health institutes, etc.

Pathania lauded the Nari Shakti Vandan Adhiniyam, 2023 (106th constitutional amendment bill) standing for 1/3rd women in Parliament & State Assemblies. He called it the greatest step towards women empowerment in India.

=== Second Tenure as MLA ===
After getting elected to Jammu and Kashmir Legislative Assembly for the second time, Pathania promised his constituents with overall development of Udhampur East Assembly constituency and making it a model constituency. Pathania raised the issue of illegal mining in Jammu and Kashmir which lead to his confrontation with DyCM Surinder Choudhary. Pathania is known for his development oriented workstyle and fulfilling his election time promises in time bound manner.

Pathania has said that it is his vision to “make Udhampur a model district for voluble, all-weather connectivity, reaching the last man in the last village.”

During and in the aftermath of 2025 floods Pathania toured his constituency extensilvely. He toured with the concerned officials and assured that the administration and relief teams are working around the clock to provide immediate relief and carry out rescue operations. He also said that administration is bound to repair all damaged infrastructure. He appealed to locals to cooperate with officials and remain patient in this difficult time. He asked the UT administration to amend SDRF norms to ensure every rain-affected family was indemnified and immediately restore drinking water supply in affected areas. He blamed the illegal mining for increasing the magnitude of the damage done by rains and flash floodings. He further said that unscientific activities have resulted in the havoc which is much severe than other districts of J&K. He pressed on utilisation of sustainable methods of development, especially the flood management and rainwater harvesting.

== Gallery ==
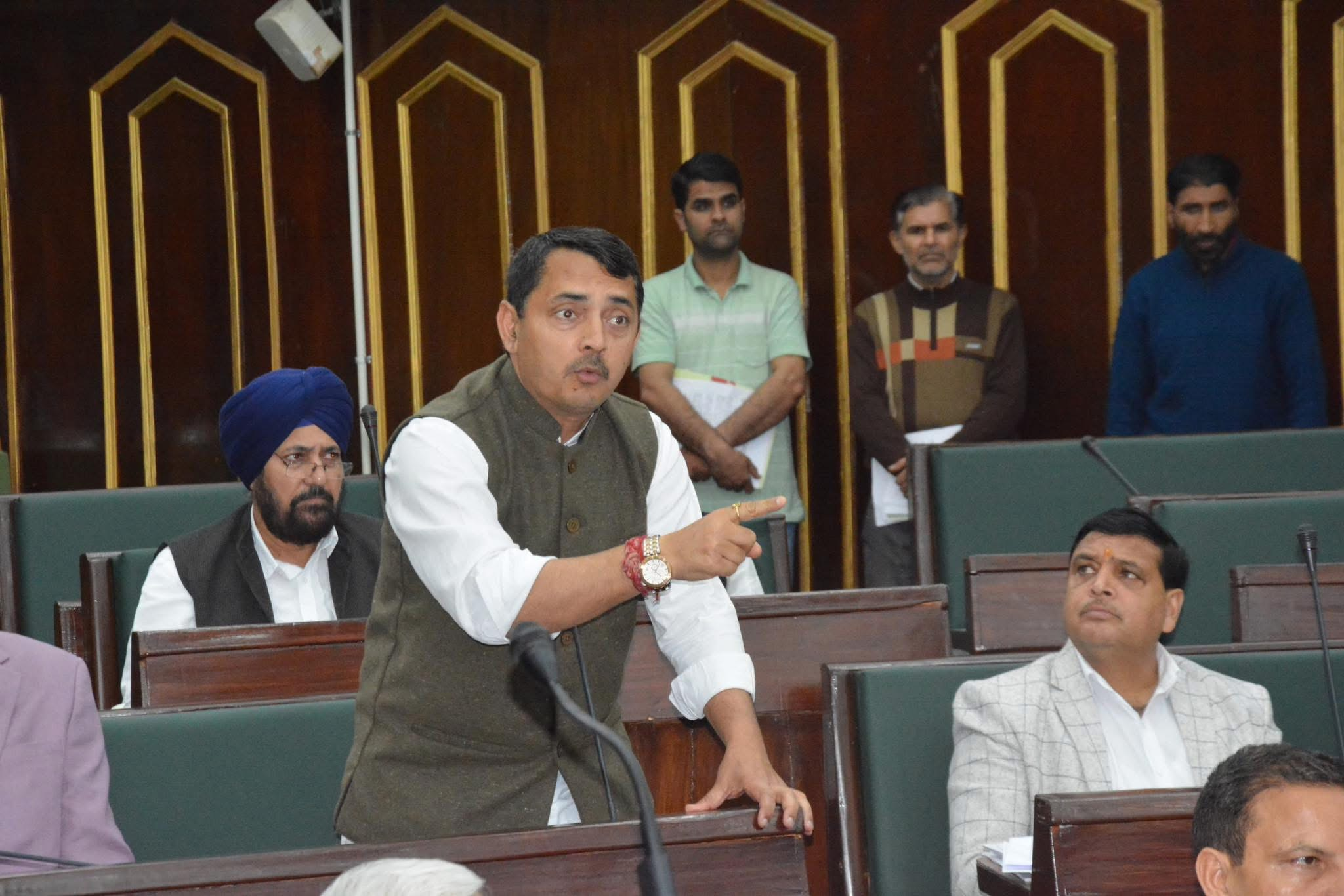
Pathania speaking in J&K Legislative Assembly in March 2025. Daleep Singh Parihar, MLA Bhaderwah on his right and Narinder Singh Raina, MLA Jammu South in his background.

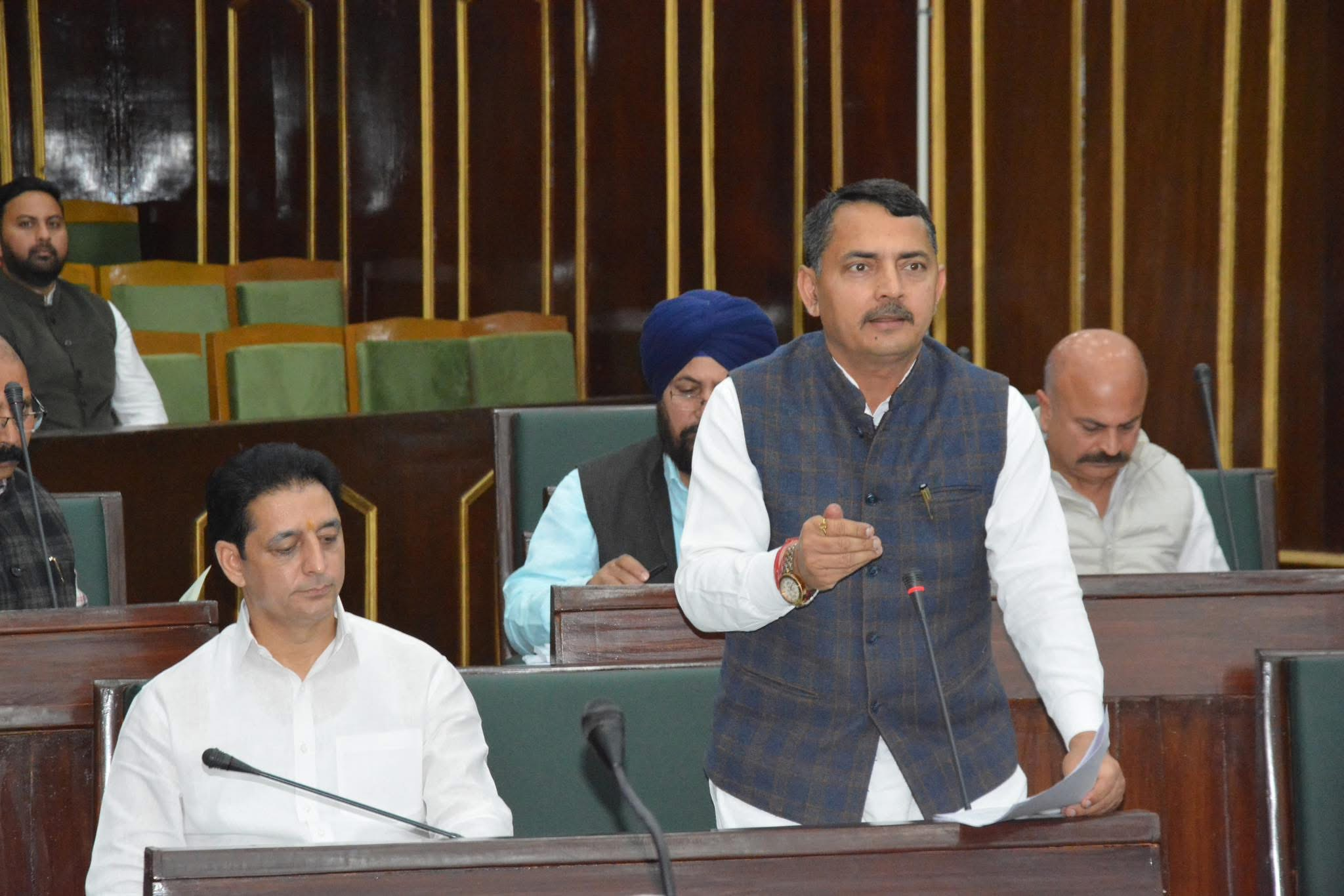
Pathania speaking in J&K Legislative Assembly. Shakti Raj Parihar, MLA Doda on his left, Narinder Singh Raina MLA Jammu South and Yudhvir Sethi MLA Jammu East Assembly constituency in his background.

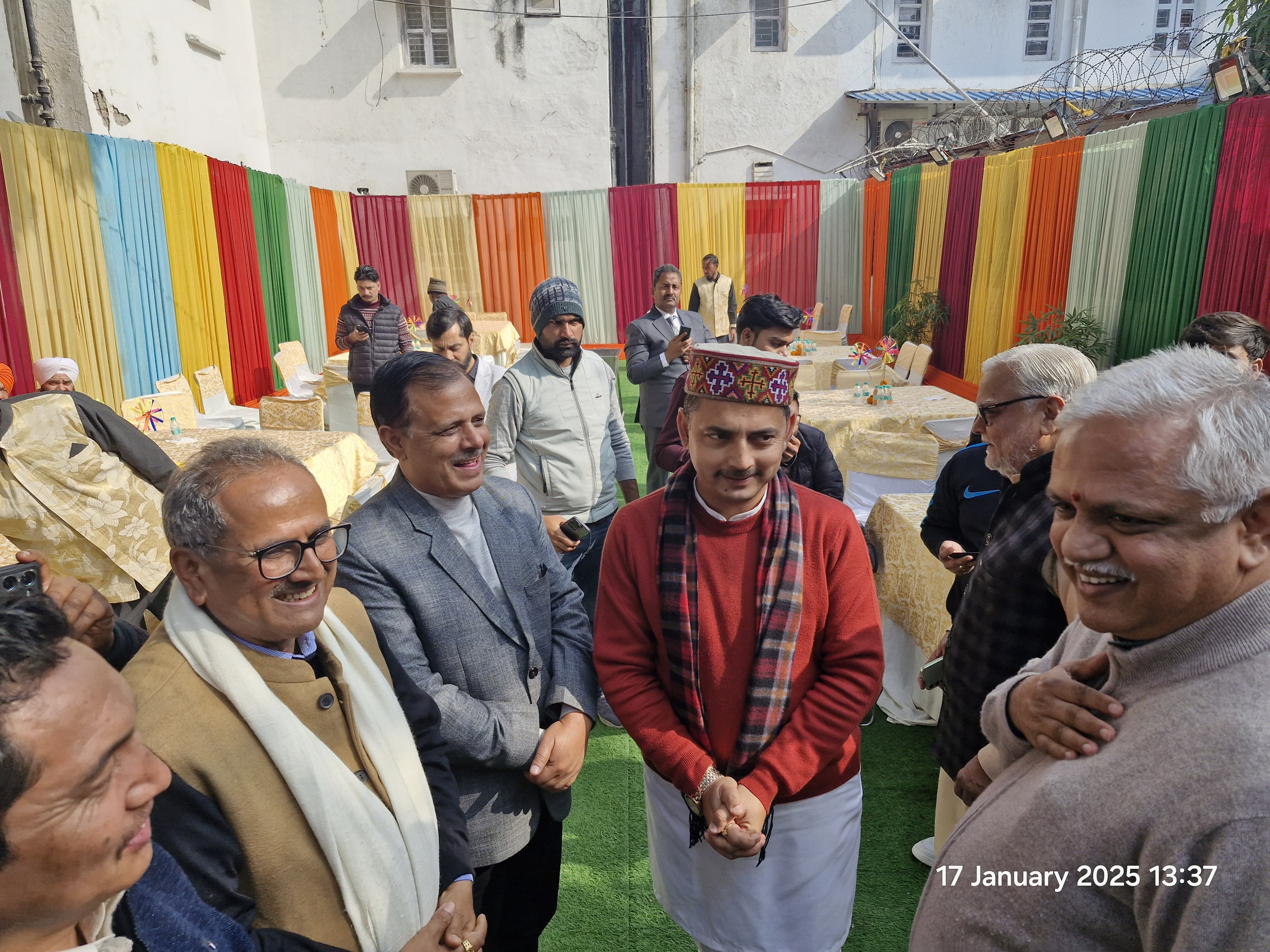
Pathania at a function in New Delhi along with B L Santhosh, National Gen Sec (Org), BJP and Dr Nirmal Singh former DyCM, J&K.

== Electoral performance ==
Election	Constituency	Party	Result	Votes %	Opposition Candidate	Opposition Party	Opposition vote %	Ref
2024	Udhampur East	BJP	Won	41.64%	Pawan Khajuria	Independent	38.67%	
2014	Ramnagar	BJP	Won	55.71%	Harsh Dev Singh	JKNPP	34.56%	
2008	Ramnagar	Independent	Lost	14.31%	Harsh Dev Singh	JKNPP	47.18%	
