= Kuldeep Raj =

Indian politician

Kuldeep Raj is an Indian politician and member of the Bharatiya Janata Party. Raj was a member of the Jammu and Kashmir Legislative Assembly from the Hiranagar constituency in Kathua district.
