= Shamsheer Singh Manhas =

Indian politician (1960–2025)

Shamsher Singh Manhas
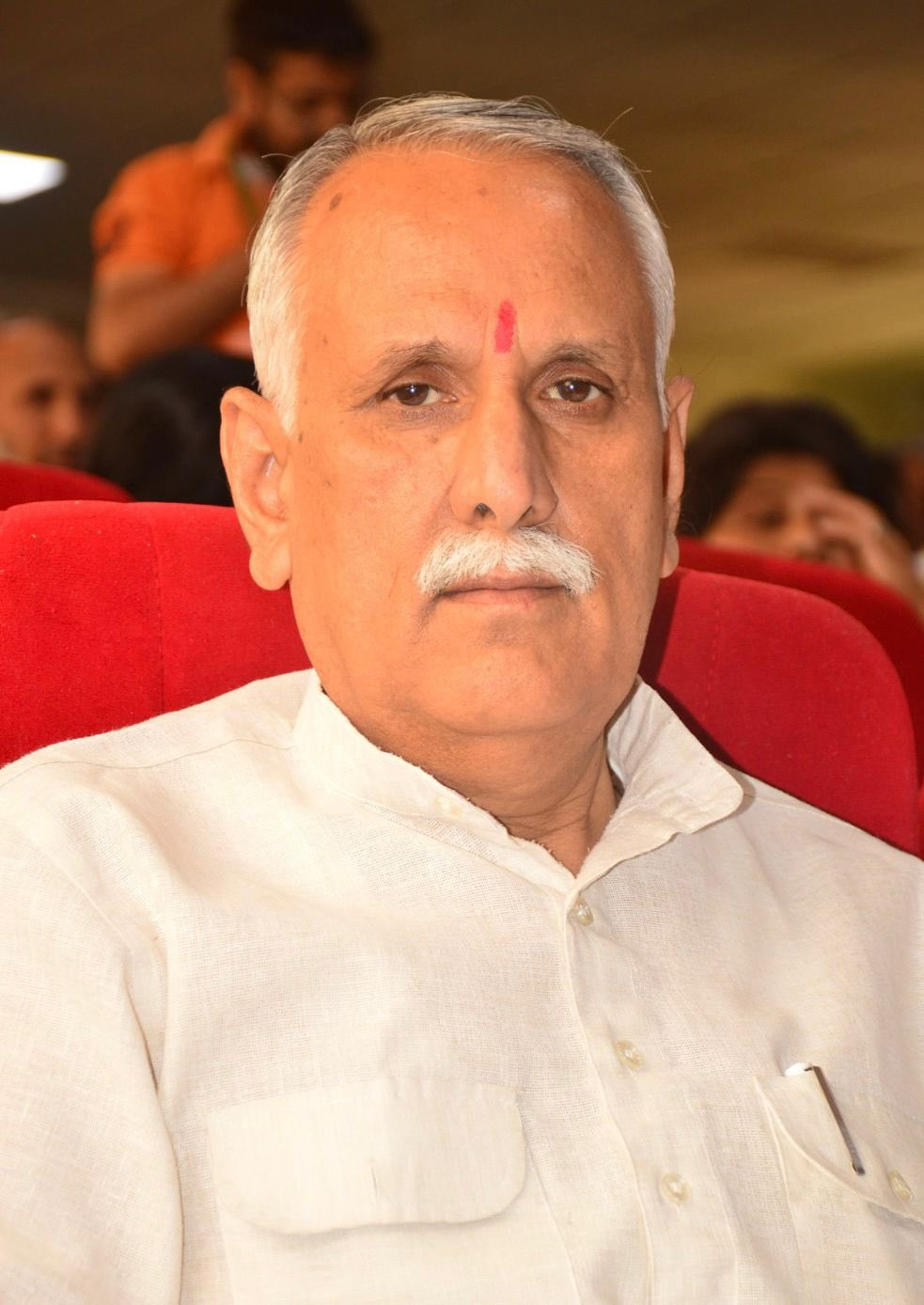
- Shamsher Singh Manhas

Member of Parliament, Rajya Sabha
- In office 11 February 2015 – 10 February 2021
- Preceded by: Saifuddin Soz
- Succeeded by: Sat Paul Sharma
- Constituency: Jammu and Kashmir

Personal details
- Born: 4 January 1960 Jammu, Jammu and Kashmir, India
- Died: 20 January 2025 (aged 65) Jammu, Jammu and Kashmir, India
- Party: Bharatiya Janata Party
- Spouse: Rajni Devi
- Children: One son, one daughter
- Education: B. Com., M. Com. (IIIrd Semester)
- Alma mater: Jammu University
- Profession: Agriculturist, Political and Social Worker, Religious Missionary and Sportsperson

Shamsher Singh Manhas (4 January 1960 – 20 January 2025) was an Indian politician from Jammu & Kashmir and a member of the Bharatiya Janata Party.

== Life and career ==
Manhas was the son of Janak Singh (not to be confused with Janak Singh). He was an agriculturist and a political and social worker by profession. He was known as the rejuvenator of Right-wing Hindu Political ideology in Jammu and Kashmir and has been an active Pracharak of RSS for a long time. He was known to be a powerful politician in the region. He was also a sportsperson.

Shamsheer Singh Manhas was a well-known personality in the politics of the J&K. He has served as the State President of BJP in the past.

He was elected to Rajya Sabha from Jammu and Kashmir on the ticket of BJP in February 2015.

Manhas retired from active politics on 9 February 2021. He died on 20 January 2025, at the age of 65.
