= Sunil Bhardwaj =

Indian politician

Member of Jammu and Kashmir Legislative Assembly
- Incumbent
- Assumed office 8 October 2024
- Preceded by: Ranbir Singh Pathania
- Constituency: Ramnagar

Personal details
- Party: Bharatiya Janata Party
- Profession: Politician

Sunil Bhardwaj is an Indian politician from Jammu & Kashmir. He is a Member of the Jammu & Kashmir Legislative Assembly from 2024, representing Ramnagar Assembly constituency as a Member of the Bharatiya Janta Party.

== See also ==
- 2024 Jammu & Kashmir Legislative Assembly election
- Jammu and Kashmir Legislative Assembly
