= Darshan Kumar (politician) =

Indian politician

Member of Jammu and Kashmir Legislative Assembly
- Incumbent
- Assumed office 8 October 2024
- Preceded by: Lal Singh
- Constituency: Basohli

Personal details
- Party: Bharatiya Janata Party
- Profession: Politician

Darshan Kumar is an Indian politician from Jammu & Kashmir. He is a Member of the Jammu & Kashmir Legislative Assembly from 2024, representing Basohli Assembly constituency as a Member of the Bharatiya Janta Party.

== Electoral performance ==
| Election | Constituency | Party | Result | Votes % | Opposition Candidate | Opposition Party | Opposition vote % | Ref |
|---|---|---|---|---|---|---|---|---|
| 2024 | Basohli | BJP | Won | 65.38% | Chaudhary Lal Singh | INC | 32.49% | |
| 2014 | Basohli | Independent | Lost | 0.90% | Chaudhary Lal Singh | BJP | 53.07% | |
| 1996 | Basohli | Independent | Lost | 15.46% | Chaudhary Lal Singh | AIIC(T) | 38.44% | |

== See also ==
- 2024 Jammu & Kashmir Legislative Assembly election
- Jammu and Kashmir Legislative Assembly
