= 1951 Jammu and Kashmir Constituent Assembly election =

- September–October 1951

All 75 seats in Jammu and Kashmir Constituent Assembly 38 seats needed for a majority
	First party
Leader	Sheikh Abdullah
Party	JKNC
Seats won	75
Prime Minister before election
Sheikh Abdullah
JKNC
Elected Prime Minister
Sheikh Abdullah
JKNC

Elections for the Constituent Assembly of the Indian state of Jammu and Kashmir were held in September–October 1951. Sheikh Abdullah was appointed the Prime Minister of Jammu and Kashmir. Following frictions with various groups such as the Jammu Praja Parishad, Abdullah was dismissed in August 1953 and imprisoned. Bakshi Ghulam Mohammad was appointed as the next prime minister.

== Background ==
The princely state of Jammu and Kashmir acceded to the Union of India on 26 October 1947. Shortly afterwards, the Maharaja of Jammu and Kashmir appointed Sheikh Abdullah as the Head of Emergency Administration, who ran the affairs in the Kashmir Valley during the Indo-Pakistani War of 1947. Following the cease-fire achieved on 1 January 1949, Sheikh Abdullah was appointed the Prime Minister of the state on 5 March 1948. He chose an eight-member Cabinet, with the other members being:

- Bakshi Ghulam Mohammad – Deputy Prime Minister
- Mirza Afzal Beg – Revenue
- Sardar Budh Singh – Health and Rehabilitation
- Ghulam Mohammed Sadiq – Development
- Shyam Lal Saraf – Civil Supplies and Local Self-Government
- Girdhari Lal Dogra – Finance
- Pir Mohammad Khan – Education

The Jammu & Kashmir National Conference, the party of Sheikh Abdullah, announced on 27 October 1950 its decision to convene a Constituent Assembly for the state of Jammu and Kashmir.

Pakistan immediately raised a complaint in the United Nations Security Council stating that India was convening a Constituent Assembly to "ratify the formal accession of the State to India" in contravention of the Security Council resolutions. India reassured all parties that the decision of the Constituent Assembly would not affect India's commitments in the Security Council. The Security Council took note of the development in its 30 March 1951 resolution and reminded both the Indian and Pakistani governments of the past resolutions of the Security Council and affirmed that the decisions of the Constituent Assembly would not be binding.

On 30 April, the Prince Regent Karan Singh issued a proclamation announcing the elections for the Constituent Assembly based on the adult franchise by secret ballot. The elections took place in September–October 1951. The Constituent Assembly was to have a nominal membership of 100 members, of which 25 seats were allocated to Azad Kashmir under Pakistani control (which were never filled). Of the remaining 75 seats, Kashmir was allocated 43 seats, Ladakh 2 seats, and Jammu 30 seats.

== The election ==
The elections were conducted by the State's election and franchise commissioner. The procedures of the election were highly irregular. All the 43 seats allocated to Kashmir went to the National Conference candidates, who were elected unopposed a week before the date of the elections. In Jammu, 13 candidates belonging to the Jammu Praja Parishad had their nominations rejected. The Praja Parishad then boycotted the elections, blaming the Government's illegal practices and official interference. Two independent candidates dropped out at the last moment, giving a clean sweep to the National Conference. In Ladakh, the Head Lama, Kushak Bakula and an associate won seats, as nominal members of the National Conference. Thus, the National Conference won all the 75 seats to the Constituent Assembly, which convened on 31 October 1951.

Scholar Sumantra Bose states that the manner of elections indicated that the National Conference elites wanted to govern Jammu and Kashmir as a one party state. Their slogan was "One Leader, One Party, One Programme". Balraj Puri, a journalist and secular activist from Jammu, is said to have argued with Jawaharlal Nehru that Ghulam Mohiuddin Karra's group in the Kashmir Valley should be allowed to function as an opposition group in the state. While Nehru agreed with the principle, he stated that nothing should be done to weaken Sheikh Abdullah.

The Jammu Praja Parishad, having been denied opportunities for the democratic opposition, took to the streets. It demanded full integration of the state with India to ensure the "legitimate democratic rights of the people" against the "anti-Dogra government of Sheikh Abdullah". The conflict with the Praja Parishad eventually led to the termination of Sheikh Abdullah's rule.

== Results ==
The elected members of the assembly, according to data hosted by the South Asia Terrorism Portal, were:

No.	Member	Constituency
1.	Maulana Mohammad Sayeed Masudi	Amira Kadal
2.	Sheikh Mohammad Abdullah	Hazratbal
3.	Bakshi Ghulam Mohammad	Safa Kadal
4	Mirza Mohammed Afzal Beg	Anantnag
5	Girdhari Lal Dogra	Jasmergarh
6	Shyam Lal Saraf	Habba Kadal
7	Abdul Aziz Shawl	Rajouri
8	Abdul Gani Trali	Rajpora
9	Abdul Gani Goni	Bhalesa
10	Syed Abdul Qudus	Beerwah
11	Bakshi Abdur Rashid	Charar-i-Sharief
12	Abdul Kabir Khan	Bandipora (Gurez)
13	Abdul Khaliq	Sonawari
14	Syed Allaudin Gilani	Handwara
15	Assad Ullah Mir	Ramban
16	Bhagat Ram	Lander Tikri (now part of Udhampur West)
17	Bhagat Chhajju Ram	Ranbirsinghpora
18	Sardar Chela Singh	Chhamb
19	Chuni Lal Kotwal	Bhaderwah
20	Durga Prasad Dhar	Kulgam
21	Ghulam Ahmad Mir	Dachinpara
22	Master Ghulam Ahmed	Haveli
23	Ghulam Ahmad Dev	Doda
24	Pirzada Ghulam Gilani	Pampore
25	Ghulam Hassan Khan	Narwah
26	Ghulam Hassan Bhat	Nandi (now part of Noorabad)
27	Ghulam Hassan Malik	Devsar
28	Pir Ghulam Mohammad Masoodi	Tral
29	Ghulam Mohammed Sadiq	Tankipora (Fateh Kadal)
30	Mirza Ghulam Mohammad Beg	Naubag (Brang Valley)
31	Ghulam Mohammad Butt	Pattan
32	Ghulam Mohi-ud-Din Khan	Khansahib
33	Ghulam Mohi-ud-Din Hamdani	Khanyar
34	Mirwaiz Ghulam Nabi Hamdani	Zadibal
35	Ghulam Nabi Wani	Daragam (now part of Wagoora-Kreeri)
36	Ghulam Nabi Wani	Lolab
37	Ghulam Qadir Bhat	Kangan
38	Ghulam Qadir Masala	Drugmulla (now part of Kupwara)
39	Ghulam Rasool Sheikh	Shopian
40	Ghulam Rasool Kar	Hamal
41	Ghulam Rasool Kraipak	Kishtwar
42	Hakim Habibullah Khan	Sopore
43	Hem Raj Jandial	Ramnagar
44	Sardar Harbans Singh Azad	Baramulla
45	Syed Ibrahim Shah	Kargil
46	Ishar Devi Maini	Jammu North
47	Janki Nath Kakroo	Kothar (now part of Nagrota)
48	Jamal-ud-Din	Darhal
49	Maulvi Jamaitali Shah	Mendhar
50	Kushak Bakula	Leh
51	Kishen Dev Sethi	Nowshera
52	Sardar Kulbir Singh	Poonch City
53	Mohammad Afzal Khan	Uri
54	Sheikh Mohammad Akbar	Tangmarg
55	Mohammad Anwar Shah	Karnah
56	Mohammad Ayub Khan	Arnas
57	Syed Mohammad Jalali	Badgam
58	Pir Mohammad Maqbool Shah	Ramhal (now part of Kupwara)
59	Syed Mir Qasim	Doru Shahabad
60	Khwaja Mubarak Shah	Magam
61	Mansukh Rai	Reasi
62	Mahant Ram	Basohli
63	Moti Ram Baigra	Udhampur
64	Mahashay Nahar Singh	Bishnah
65	Noor Dar	Khowarpora (now part of Karnah)
66	Noor-ud-Din Sufi	Ganderbal
67	Major Piara Singh	Kathua
68	Ram Chand Khajuria	Billawar
69	Lala Ram Piara Saraf	Samba
70	Ram Devi	Jammu South
71	Ram Rakha Mal	Kahanachak
72	Wazir Ram Saran	Jindrah Garota (now part of Nagrota)
73	Ram Lal	Akhnoor
74	Sagar Singh	Purmandal
75	Sana Ullah Sheikh	Pulwama

== Government formation ==
=== Sheikh Abdullah ministry ===
Sheikh Abdullah continued as the Prime Minister of the State. Two members of the erstwhile Cabinet from the Jammu province, Sardar Budh Singh and Pir Mohammad Khan were dropped. Ghulam Mohammed Sadiq stepped down from his Cabinet duties to serve as the Chairman of the Constituent Assembly. The remaining members of the Cabinet were:

- Sheikh Abdullah – Prime Minister
- Bakshi Ghulam Mohammad – Deputy Prime Minister
- Mirza Afzal Beg
- Shyam Lal Saraf
- Girdhari Lal Dogra

Later on, D. P. Dhar, Khwaja Mubarak Shah, Major Piara Singh and Ghulam Mohiuddin Hamdani were appointed as Deputy Ministers.

=== Bakshi Ghulam Mohammad ministry ===
Following intense frictions with the Jammu Praja Parishad in Jammu and the Head Lama Kushak Bakula of Ladakh, as well as ongoing frictions with the Union government, Sheikh Abdullah was dismissed from the post of prime minister by the Sadr-e-Riyasat (head of state) Karan Singh in August 1953. Abdullah was also arrested on conspiracy charges. The deputy prime minister Bakshi Ghulam Mohammad was sworn in as the next prime minister. His Cabinet members were:

- Bakshi Ghulam Mohammad – Prime minister
- Ghulam Mohammed Sadiq – Education
- Shyam Lal Saraf – Development
- Girdhari Lal Dogra – Finance
- Syed Mir Qasim – Revenue

The 19th Kushak Bakula was appointed as a deputy minister and he pledged his support for the new government. Bakshi Ghulam Mohammad continued as the prime minister for the remaining six-year term of the Constituent Assembly. The Assembly continued with its mission of formulating the State Constitution, which was adopted on 17 November 1956, coming into effect on 26 January 1957.

== Bibliography ==
- Bose, Sumantra (2003). Kashmir: Roots of Conflict, Paths to Peace. Harvard University Press. doi:10.2307/j.ctv1p6hp3k. ISBN 9780674011731. JSTOR j.ctv1p6hp3k.
- Das Gupta, Jyoti Bhusan (2012) [first published 1968]. Jammu and Kashmir. Springer. doi:10.1007/978-94-011-9231-6. ISBN 978-94-011-9231-6.
- Tillin, Louise (2006). "Unite in Diversity? Asymmetry in Indian Federalism". Publius: The Journal of Federalism. 37 (1): 45–67. doi:10.1093/publius/pjl017. hdl:10.1093/publius/pjl017.
