= 1962 Jammu and Kashmir Legislative Assembly election =

Local election in India

1962 Jammu and Kashmir state assembly elections
- 17–18 February 1962

all 75 seats in Legislative Assembly 38 seats needed for a majority
- Turnout: 40.3%
	First party	Second party
Leader	Bakshi Ghulam Mohammad
Party	JKNC	Praja Parishad
Leader since	1953
Leader's seat	Safa Kadal
Last election	69	5
Seats won	70	3
Seat change	▲1	▼2
Popular vote	486,060	126,836
Percentage	66.96%	17.47%
Prime Minister before election
Bakshi Ghulam Mohammad
JKNC
Elected Prime Minister
Bakshi Ghulam Mohammad
JKNC

Elections for the Indian state of Jammu and Kashmir were held in the early months of 1962. Bakshi Ghulam Mohammad was appointed Prime Minister of Jammu and Kashmir.

== Background ==
After the 1957 elections, Bakshi Ghulam Mohammad failed to appoint any member of the G. M. Sadiq-led leftist faction to the Cabinet, leading Sadiq to form a rival Democratic National Conference party. However, in 1960, a reconciliation was brokered by the central government, and the two parties reunited. The reunited party contested the elections in 1962. However, 20 candidates from the rump Democratic National Conference party contested the election.

The other parties contesting the elections were the Jammu Praja Parishad, Praja Socialist Party and Harijan Mandal.

The 1962 elections were the first elections in the state conducted by the Election Commission of India. The earlier elections were held by the State's Franchise Commissioner.

== Results ==
Of the 43 constituencies in the Kashmir Valley, 32 were unopposed. Overall, the National Conference won 41 of the 43 seats in the Valley.

In the Jammu Division, the National Conference won 27 of the 30 seats (two of which were unopposed). The remaining three seats went to the Praja Parishad.

In the Ladakh Division, all two seats were won by the National Conference. The Ladakh seat was won by the Head Llama Kushak Bakula.

After the elections, the Praja Parishad held a mass demonstration in the Jammu city, joined by the Praja Socialist Party and the Akali Dal, citing electoral malpractices. Bakshi Ghulam Mohammad dismissed the complaints as "frivolous".

Party	Votes	%	Seats
Jammu & Kashmir National Conference	486,060	66.96	70
Jammu Praja Parishad	126,836	17.47	3
Others	59,078	8.14	0
Independents	53,892	7.42	2
Total	725,866	100.00	75
Valid votes	725,866	97.59	
Invalid/blank votes	17,940	2.41	
Total votes	743,806	100.00	
Registered voters/turnout	1,843,930	40.34	
Source: ECI

== Elected members ==
Winner, runner-up, voter turnout, and victory margin in every constituency
Assembly Constituency		Turnout	Winner				Runner Up				Margin
#k	Names	%	Candidate	Party	Votes	%	Candidate	Party	Votes	%	Margin
1	Akhnoor	65.32%	Shiv Ram	JKNC	10,156	60.83%	Sat Dev	JPP	5,204	31.17%	4,952
2	Chhamb	74.41%	Chhaju Ram Lamba	JKNC	10,142	52.85%	Sahdev Singh	JPP	6,401	33.36%	3,741
3	Ranbir Singh Pora–Jammu South	79.4%	Bhagat Chhaju Ram	JKNC	8,199	55.52%	Shiv Ram	Democratic National Conference	5,027	34.04%	3,172
4	Miran Sahib	76.03%	Kulbir Singh	JKNC	6,317	49.92%	Sant Singh	Independent	2,244	17.73%	4,073
5	Marh	75.58%	Guranditta Mal	JKNC	5,200	41.49%	Ram Rakha Mal	JPP	3,734	29.79%	1,466
6	Jandrah Gharota	65.61%	Rounaq Singh	JKNC	8,867	50.7%	Rajinder Singh	JPP	5,677	32.46%	3,190
7	Bishnah	85.04%	Trilochan Datt	JKNC	8,783	46.99%	Ram Piara Saraf	Democratic National Conference	5,768	30.86%	3,015
8	Ramgarh	71.2%	Parmanad	JKNC	5,674	34.67%	Shivdass	JPP	3,903	23.85%	1,771
9	Basohli	51.27%	Mangat Ram Sharma	JKNC	7,394	59.11%	Uttam Chand	JPP	4,459	35.65%	2,935
10	Billawar	62.89%	Ram Chander Khajuria	JKNC	7,819	49.78%	Dhian Singh	JPP	7,307	46.52%	512
11	Kathua	75.86%	Randhir Singh	JKNC	9,826	55.33%	Chagar Singh	JPP	4,642	26.14%	5,184
12	Jasmergarh	80.26%	Girdhari Lal Dogra	JKNC	13,958	58.48%	Baldev Singh	JPP	7,789	32.63%	6,169
13	Samba	73.36%	K. Sagar Singh	JKNC	7,495	43.71%	Dhyan Singh	JPP	6,727	39.23%	768
14	Jammu North	70.19%	Prem Nath	JPP	14,728	66.64%	Hardatt Bakshi	JKNC	6,966	31.52%	7,762
15	Jammu South	71.01%	Ram Chand Mahajan	JKNC	9,329	51.28%	Ram Nath	JPP	5,835	32.07%	3,494
16	Nowshera	62.44%	Beli Ram	JKNC	11,608	54.3%	Krishan Dev Sethi	Democratic National Conference	4,939	23.1%	6,669
17	Rajouri	81.6%	Abdul Aziz Shawal	JKNC	14,192	76.76%	Dev Raj	Democratic National Conference	4,297	23.24%	9,895
18	Darhal	84.32%	Mohammed Iqbal Malik	JKNC	13,601	71.02%	Adbul Rehman	PSP	5,550	28.98%	8,051
19	Mendhar	-	Pir Jamat Ali Shah	JKNC	Elected Unopposed						
20	Poonch Haveli	71.34%	Ghulam Mohammad Mir	JKNC	15,148	71.14%	Ghulam Qadir Bandey	Independent	5,819	27.33%	9,329
21	Ramnagar	69.24%	Hem Raj	JKNC	11,680	62.71%	Hans Raj	JPP	6,077	32.63%	5,603
22	Udhampur	61.94%	Amar Nath Sharma	JKNC	8,003	49.6%	Paras Ram	JPP	7,815	48.44%	188
23	Landar Tikri	60.1%	Shiv Charan	JPP	7,595	47.53%	Faqir Chand	JKNC	6,929	43.36%	666
24	Reasi	72.01%	Rishi Kumar Kaushal	JPP	8,842	45.46%	Rikhi Kesh	JKNC	8,595	44.19%	247
25	Arnas	80.84%	Mohammad Ayub Khan	JKNC	21,378	95.74%	Lakhmi Chand	JPP	951	4.26%	20,427
26	Ramban	79.58%	Mir Assadullah	JKNC	18,332	83.39%	Devi Dass	PSP	2,981	13.56%	15,351
27	Doda	70.78%	Lassa Wani	JKNC	16,146	89.37%	Abdul Rehman	Independent	1,921	10.63%	14,225
28	Kishtwar	74.94%	Syed Mir Badshah	JKNC	14,988	75.93%	Sewa Ram	JPP	4,752	24.07%	10,236
29	Bhaderwah	58.56%	Chuni Lal	JKNC	11,150	71.83%	Abdul Rehman	JPP	4,372	28.17%	6,778
30	Bhalessa–Bunjwah	70.08%	Abdul Gani Goni	JKNC	13,717	89.1%	Rup Chand	JPP	1,678	10.9%	12,039
31	Anantnag	-	Shamas - Ud- Din	JKNC	Elected Unopposed						
32	Kothar	-	Manohar Nath Kaul	JKNC	Elected Unopposed						
33	Naubug	-	Nizam-Ud-Din	JKNC	Elected Unopposed						
34	Doru Shahbad	-	Mir Qasim	JKNC	Elected Unopposed						
35	Khowarpara	-	Noor-Ud-Din Dar	JKNC	Elected Unopposed						
36	Dachhinpora	-	Mohammad Syed	JKNC	Elected Unopposed						
37	Devsar	-	Abdul Aziz Zargar	JKNC	Elected Unopposed						
38	Kulgam	-	Mohammed Yaqub Bhat	JKNC	Elected Unopposed						
39	Nandi	-	Abdul Kabir Wani	JKNC	Elected Unopposed						
40	Noorabad	-	Ghulam Hussain Khan	JKNC	Elected Unopposed						
41	Shopian	-	Abdul Majid Bandey	JKNC	Elected Unopposed						
42	Pampore	-	Peerzada Ghulam Jeelani	JKNC	Elected Unopposed						
43	Pulwama	-	Sanaullah Sheikh	JKNC	Elected Unopposed						
44	Tral	-	A. G. Trali	JKNC	Elected Unopposed						
45	Rajpora	86.51%	Ghulam Mohammad Rajpori	JKNC	22,196	98.65%	Abdul Sattar Ranjoor	Democratic National Conference	181	.8%	22,015
46	Amira Kadal	64.23%	Sham Lal Saraf	JKNC	10,313	85.47%	Om Prakash	PSP	1,753	14.53%	8,560
47	Habba Kadal	76.46%	Durga Prasad Dhar	JKNC	14,495	95.16%	Ghulam Mohammed Malik	Democratic National Conference	516	3.39%	13,979
48	Tankipora	-	Ghulam Mohammed Sadiq	JKNC	Elected Unopposed						
49	Khanyar	72.61%	Gazi Abdul Rehman	JKNC	12,762	95.99%	Baha - Ud - Din	Democratic National Conference	533	4.01%	12,229
50	Safa Kadal	-	Bakshi Ghulam Mohammad	JKNC	Elected Unopposed						
51	Zadibal	72.24%	Shaik Mohammad Abdullah	JKNC	14,093	83.76%	Syed Abdullah Shah	Independent	2,732	16.24%	11,361
52	Kangan	-	Main Nizam Ud-Din	JKNC	Elected Unopposed						
53	Ganderbal	-	Abdul Salam Aitu	JKNC	Elected Unopposed						
54	Hazratbal	-	Mohammed Yahya Sidiqi	JKNC	Elected Unopposed						
55	Birwa	-	Syed Abdul Qudus Azad	JKNC	Elected Unopposed						
56	Budgam	80.18%	Aga Syed Ali Safvi	JKNC	18,719	95.07%	Ghulam Nabi Wani Gohar	Independent	970	4.93%	17,749
57	Darhgam	62.3%	Ghulam Nabi Wani	Independent	7,573	53.71%	Ghulam Mohammed Mir	JKNC	6,527	46.29%	1,046
58	Khan Sahib	61.6%	Ghulam Mohi-Ud-Din Khan	JKNC	9,687	76.31%	Ghulam Mohammed Bakshi	Independent	3,007	23.69%	6,680
59	Charari Sharief	-	Bakshi Abdul Rashid	JKNC	Elected Unopposed						
60	Baramulla	80.03%	Harbans Singh Azad	JKNC	17,021	88.45%	Sant Singh	Independent	2,223	11.55%	14,798
61	Tangamarg	-	Mohammad Akbar	JKNC	Elected Unopposed						
62	Magam	-	Syed Abbas	JKNC	Elected Unopposed						
63	Pattan	-	Ghulam Mohammad Bhat Zalib	JKNC	Elected Unopposed						
64	Sopore	-	Abdul Ghani Malik	JKNC	Elected Unopposed						
65	Rafiabad	-	Ghulam Rasool Kar	JKNC	Elected Unopposed						
66	Bandipora	90.55%	Abdul Kabir Khan	JKNC	21,138	98.25%	Ghulam Mohammad Lone	Democratic National Conference	376	1.75%	20,762
67	Sonawari	-	Abdul Khaliq Bhat	JKNC	Elected Unopposed						
68	Handwara	79.77%	Abdul Gani Mir	Independent	11,429	60.63%	Ghulam Qadir Massala	JKNC	7,422	39.37%	4,007
69	Drugmulla	-	Mohammad Sultan Tantray	JKNC	Elected Unopposed						
70	Lolab	-	Ghulam Nabi Wani	JKNC	Elected Unopposed						
71	Ramhal	-	Ghulam Mohammad Wani	JKNC	Elected Unopposed						
72	Karnah	-	Mohammed Yunis Khan	JKNC	Elected Unopposed						
73	Uri	-	Mohammed Afzal Khan Raja	JKNC	Elected Unopposed						
74	Leh	90.22%	Kushak Bakula	JKNC	20,095	97.3%	Chering Punchok	Independent	558	2.7%	19,537
75	Kargil	-	Agha Sayad Ibrahim Shah	JKNC	Elected Unopposed						

== Aftermath ==
Bakshi Ghulam Mohammad was increasingly seen in New Delhi as an embarrassment as he arranged most seats to be elected unopposed. In 1963, he was forced to step down, and Khwaja Shamsuddin was elected as the Chief Minister. Bakshi ensured that his rival G. M. Sadiq could not be appointed. The Shamsuddin government again excluded Sadiq his colleagues from Cabinet appointments.

In December 1963, the pent-up anger of the populace erupted over a stolen religious relic from the Srinagar's Hazratbal Mosque. Even though the relic was subsequently recovered, the people did not trust the government and continued the agitation. In the fall-out, Shamsuddin lost his post, and G. M. Sadiq was appointed as the Chief Minister in February 1965.

== Bibliography ==
- Bose, Sumantra (2003), Kashmir: Roots of Conflict, Paths to Peace, Harvard University Press, ISBN 0-674-01173-2
- Das Gupta, Jyoti Bhusan (2012) [first published 1968], Jammu and Kashmir, Springer, ISBN 978-94-011-9231-6
