= 1967 Jammu and Kashmir Legislative Assembly election =

- 21 February 1967

all 75 seats in Legislative Assembly 38 seats needed for a majority
- Turnout: 58.8%
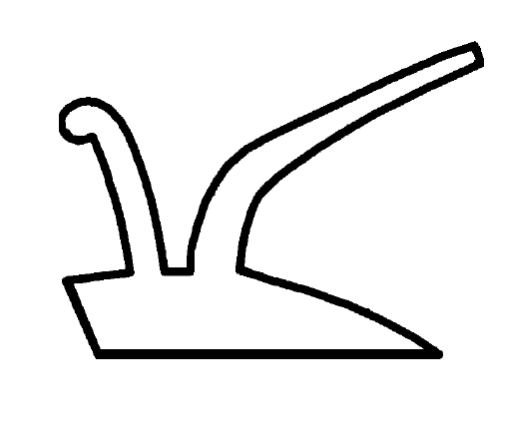

	First party	Second party	Third party
	INC
Leader	Ghulam Mohammed Sadiq	Bakshi Ghulam Mohammad
Party	INC	JKNC	ABJS
Leader's seat	Amirakadal	Safakadal
Last election	New	70	New
Seats won	▲61	8	3
Seat change	New	▼62	New
Chief Minister before election
Ghulam Mohammed Sadiq
INC
Elected Chief Minister
Ghulam Mohammed Sadiq
INC

Elections for the Indian state of Jammu and Kashmir were held in February 1967. Ghulam Mohammed Sadiq was appointed Chief Minister of Jammu and Kashmir.

== Background ==
In 1965, the working committee of the Jammu & Kashmir National Conference announced that it would dissolve itself and merge with the Indian National Congress. A rival faction led by Bakshi Ghulam Mohammad refused to go along and contested the elections under the National Conference banner.

Prior to that, in 1963, the Jammu Praja Parishad also merged into the national party Bharatiya Jana Sangh. These mergers are seen by analysts as a major "centralizing strategy" and a victory for the Hindu nationalist agenda of the Praja Parishad and its allies.

There were reports that Bakshi was planning to forge an electoral alliance with the Jana Sangh, despite their differences on the Article 370, but the alliance did not materialize. The Jana Sangh, whose main base was in the Jammu Division, planned to contest in the Kashmir Valley taking advantage of the rivalry between the Congress and the National Conference.

== The election ==
Of the 75 seats, 42 seats were allocated to the Kashmir Valley, 31 to Jammu, and 2 to Ladakh.

The National Conference contested 73 seats overall. The Jana Sangh contested all 31 seats of Jammu and several seats in the Valley. The Plebiscite Front officially boycotted the election, but several members contested as independent candidates, including the General Secretary Ali Mohammad Naik, who contested from Tral, and Ghulam Mohammed Bhat, contesting from Habbakadal in Srinagar. The Awami Action Committee also boycotted the election. Other parties that contested included the rump group of the National Conference under the leadership of Bakshi Ghulam Mohammad, the rump group of the Democratic National Conference under the leadership of Ram Piara Saraf, and the national parties Communist Party of India, Praja Socialist Party and the Hindu Mahasabha.

The nomination papers of 118 candidates were rejected on technical grounds, 55 of them because the candidates had failed to take the obligatory oath of allegiance to the Constitution. As a result, 22 seats in the Valley were unopposed, resulting in a win for the Congress candidates.

Simultaneously, elections were also held for the Lok Sabha (the Lower House of the Indian Parliament) in the 6 Lok Sabha constituencies of the State.

== Results ==
The Indian National Congress won 61 seats in the state assembly, emerging as the winning party. Bakshi's National Conference won 8 seats and the Jana Sangh 3 seats. Three other seats were won by independent candidates, one of them by Ali Mohammed Naik of the Plebiscite Front.

In the elections for the Lok Sabha, 5 of the 6 seats were won by the Congress, of which 2 were unopposed. The remaining seat was won by Bakshi Ghulam Mohammad of the National Conference, contesting from Srinagar. Scholar Sumantra Bose remarks that Bakshi might never have won a free election "at any point during his ten years in office", but he did so now holding the banner of Kashmiri regionalist resistance to New Delhi.

Party	Votes	%	Seats	+/–
Indian National Congress	423,922	53.02	61	New
Jammu & Kashmir National Conference	137,179	17.16	8	▼62
Bharatiya Jana Sangh	131,542	16.45	3	New
Others	38,552	4.82	0	0
Independents	68,377	8.55	3	▲1
Total	799,572	100.00	75	0
Valid votes	799,572	86.51		
Invalid/blank votes	124,727	13.49		
Total votes	924,299	100.00		
Registered voters/turnout	1,419,253	65.13		
Source: ECI

== Results by constituency ==
Winner, runner-up, voter turnout, and victory margin in every constituency
Assembly Constituency		Turnout	Winner				Runner Up				Margin
#k	Names	%	Candidate	Party	Votes	%	Candidate	Party	Votes	%	Margin
1	Karnah	-	Mohammed Yunis Khan	INC	Elected Unopposed						
2	Kupwara	-	Mohammad Sultan Tantray	INC	Elected Unopposed						
3	Lolab	-	Ghulam Nabi Wani	INC	Elected Unopposed						
4	Bandipora	69.99%	M. A. Khan	INC	12,733	57.39%	Abdul Kabir Khan	JKNC	8,288	37.36%	4,445
5	Handwara	-	Abdul Ghani Lone	INC	Elected Unopposed						
6	Harl	54.99%	Abdul Gani Mir	INC	11,226	67.42%	G. Rasool	Independent	5,425	32.58%	5,801
7	Rafiabad	59.06%	Ghulam Rasool Kar	INC	8,951	57.85%	J. Singh	JKNC	6,521	42.15%	2,430
8	Baramulla	55.01%	Shamas-Ud-Din	JKNC	9,180	58.28%	H. Singh	INC	6,572	41.72%	2,608
9	Sopore	30.9%	Ghulam Nabi Mircha	INC	4,434	56.64%	A. G. Panzoo	JKNC	3,068	39.19%	1,366
10	Pattan	53.65%	G. R. Dar	JKNC	7,764	56.9%	G. Q. B. Bedar	INC	5,881	43.1%	1,883
11	Sonawari	63.13%	Abdul Aziz Parray	INC	13,563	65.07%	G. Rather	JKNC	7,281	34.93%	6,282
12	Gulmarg	46.93%	S. S. Singh	JKNC	9,970	80.6%	G. M. B. Jalile	INC	2,400	19.4%	7,570
13	Uri	-	M. M. Khan	INC	Elected Unopposed						
14	Kangan	-	Mian Bashir Ahmed	INC	Elected Unopposed						
15	Ganderbal	-	Mohammed Maqbool Bhat	INC	Elected Unopposed						
16	Amira Kadal	52.73%	Ghulam Mohammed Sadiq	INC	10,480	73.57%	G. A. Sofi	JKNC	3,765	26.43%	6,715
17	Habba Kadal	34.93%	S. K. Kaul	INC	3,486	46.91%	R. N. Kaul	JKNC	1,555	20.93%	1,931
18	Tankipora	39.53%	Noor Mohammad	INC	5,340	67.51%	A. R. Keng	JKNC	2,570	32.49%	2,770
19	Khanyar	26.17%	G. Ahmed	INC	2,656	44.97%	G. A. R. Bhat	JKNC	2,595	43.94%	61
20	Safa Kadal	24.96%	Bakshi Ghulam Mohammad	JKNC	4,558	70.67%	M. M. Salali	INC	1,892	29.33%	2,666
21	Zadibal	28.55%	Shaik Mohammad Abdullah	JKNC	3,599	52.1%	M. A. Shair	INC	1,974	28.58%	1,625
22	Hazratbal	41.27%	M. Y. Sidiqi	JKNC	6,550	55.01%	G. A. Sofi	INC	4,763	40.01%	1,787
23	Beerwah	-	A. Quddus	INC	Elected Unopposed						
24	Khan Sahib	-	A. G. Namthali	INC	Elected Unopposed						
25	Budgam	41.03%	H. S. Mehdi	JKNC	6,250	64.12%	M. S. Ali	INC	2,304	23.64%	3,946
26	Charari Sharief	50.12%	Abdul Qayoom	INC	6,241	52.21%	G. N. Wani	JKNC	4,766	39.87%	1,475
27	Chadoora	57.31%	Mir Mustafa	INC	9,050	66.95%	A. R. Magrey	JKNC	4,467	33.05%	4,583
28	Rajpora	-	G. M. Rajpori	INC	Elected Unopposed						
29	Pulwama	-	Sanaullah Sheikh	INC	Elected Unopposed						
30	Pampore	37.46%	P. M. Shah	INC	5,271	64.87%	A. A. Dar	Independent	2,855	35.13%	2,416
31	Tral	78.99%	A. M. Naik	Independent	12,781	72.14%	A. G. Trali	INC	4,935	27.86%	7,846
32	Shopian	63.29%	S. A. Shamim	Independent	7,576	45.7%	G. H. Khan	INC	6,195	37.37%	1,381
33	Noorabad	-	Abdul Aziz Zargar	INC	Elected Unopposed						
34	Devsar	-	Manohar Nath Kaul	INC	Elected Unopposed						
35	Kulgam	-	M. Y. Bhat	INC	Elected Unopposed						
36	Nandi	-	A. Rehman	INC	Elected Unopposed						
37	Pahalgam	-	Makhan Lal Fotedar	INC	Elected Unopposed						
38	Srigufwara–Bijbehara	-	Mufti Mohammad Sayeed	INC	Elected Unopposed						
39	Anantnag	-	Shamasuddin	INC	Elected Unopposed						
40	Kothar	-	Mohammed Ashraf Khan	INC	Elected Unopposed						
41	Verinag	-	Syed Mir Qasim	INC	Elected Unopposed						
42	Naubug	-	Hassan-Ud-Din	INC	Elected Unopposed						
43	Leh	79.78%	S. Wangyal	INC	16,270	81.69%	N. C. Stanzin	Independent	3,647	18.31%	12,623
44	Kargil	67.77%	Kachoo Mohammed Ali Khan	Independent	10,868	59.79%	A. I. Shah	INC	7,309	40.21%	3,559
45	Kishtwar	44.82%	G. Mustafa	INC	7,726	69.07%	G. Nabi	Independent	3,459	30.93%	4,267
46	Inderwal	43.99%	Khan Abdul Gani Goni	INC	5,993	56.05%	L. Mallik	JKNC	3,235	30.25%	2,758
47	Bhaderwah	39.18%	J. Ram	INC	5,562	58.56%	Faqiroo	Independent	3,936	41.44%	1,626
48	Doda	43.19%	Lassa Wani	INC	5,497	53.26%	Mohammed Akbar Kichloo	JKNC	3,225	31.25%	2,272
49	Ramban	42.48%	H. Raj	INC	3,913	42.49%	D. Dass	PSP	2,729	29.63%	1,184
50	Banihal	58.46%	M. Akhtar	JKNC	7,570	54.22%	Assadullah	INC	6,391	45.78%	1,179
51	Gulabgarh	88.14%	Mohammed Ayub Khan	INC	23,307	96.36%	F. Mohammed	JKNC	880	3.64%	22,427
52	Reasi	69.27%	Bansi Lal Kohistani	INC	8,417	48.4%	R. K. Kaushal	ABJS	7,999	45.99%	418
53	Tikri	62.13%	Shiv Charan	ABJS	8,926	49.39%	M. Ram	INC	7,793	43.12%	1,133
54	Udhampur	61.6%	H. Raj	INC	7,267	40.19%	P. Ram	ABJS	5,993	33.15%	1,274
55	Ramnagar	56.54%	Chandhu Lal	INC	10,687	61.7%	Ram Dass	ABJS	5,017	28.96%	5,670
56	Basohli	56.14%	Mangat Ram Sharma	INC	7,805	53.25%	U. Chand	ABJS	4,073	27.79%	3,732
57	Billawar	71.01%	Balbir Singh	INC	10,711	58.48%	Dhian Singh	ABJS	6,415	35.03%	4,296
58	Kathua	66.17%	Panjaboo Ram Alias Singh	INC	10,598	53.74%	K. Chand	ABJS	6,176	31.32%	4,422
59	Jasmergarh	78.45%	Girdhari Lal Dogra	INC	14,823	57.23%	Baldev Singh	ABJS	10,162	39.23%	4,661
60	Samba	72.54%	P. Nand	INC	8,349	46.6%	G. Chand	ABJS	5,156	28.78%	3,193
61	Ramgarh	72.41%	D. Nath	INC	9,789	52.63%	D. Dass	ABJS	4,525	24.33%	5,264
62	Bishnah	81.14%	Bhagat Chhaju Ram	INC	11,037	55.31%	S. Dass	ABJS	3,832	19.2%	7,205
63	Ranbir Singh Pora–Jammu South	76.61%	K. Singh	INC	8,525	49.99%	J. Raj	JKNC	4,985	29.23%	3,540
64	Jandrah Gharota	66.36%	Rounaq Singh	INC	8,304	59.68%	Rajinder Singh	ABJS	3,685	26.48%	4,619
65	Marh	74.87%	Guranditta Mal	INC	5,393	40.87%	N. Mal	ABJS	4,357	33.02%	1,036
66	Jammu Cantonment	76.3%	P. T. Dutta	INC	10,692	54.6%	R. Singh	JKNC	4,945	25.25%	5,747
67	Jammu South	70.26%	R. Nath	ABJS	10,590	54.96%	R. Nath	INC	6,832	35.46%	3,758
68	Jammu North	67.54%	Prem Nath	ABJS	10,262	59.7%	B. Ram	INC	5,938	34.55%	4,324
69	Akhnoor	80.08%	Dharam Pal	INC	11,267	60.45%	K. Lal	ABJS	3,322	17.82%	7,945
70	Chhamb	82.29%	Chhaju Ram Lamba	INC	9,267	43.39%	S. Singh	ABJS	8,135	38.09%	1,132
71	Nowshera	64.45%	Beli Ram	INC	6,454	38.84%	N. Kumar	PSP	5,060	30.45%	1,394
72	Darhal	59.75%	Chowdhary Mohmmad Hussain	INC	13,071	71.03%	R. Lal	ABJS	3,055	16.6%	10,016
73	Rajouri	67.38%	A. Rashid	INC	7,653	56.54%	P. Ram	ABJS	2,823	20.86%	4,830
74	Mendhar	-	M. Aslam	INC	Elected Unopposed						
75	Poonch Haveli	47.%	Ghulam Mohammad Mir	INC	10,935	74.94%	S. R. Nath	ABJS	3,145	21.55%	7,790

== Government formation ==
On 17 March, a 14-member ministry headed by G. M. Sadiq was sworn in. The Cabinet ministers included Girdhari Lal Dogra, D. P. Dhar, Mohammed Ayub Khan, Peer Giasuddin and Kanwar Ranjit Singh. Abdul Gani Lone was among the Ministers of State, and Mufti Mohammed Sayeed was among the Deputy Ministers.

== Bibliography ==
- Bose, Sumantra (2003), Kashmir: Roots of Conflict, Paths to Peace, Harvard University Press, ISBN 0-674-01173-2
- Das Gupta, Jyoti Bhusan (2012) [first published 1968], Jammu and Kashmir, Springer, ISBN 978-94-011-9231-6
