= Jasmergarh Assembly constituency =

Constituency of the Jammu and Kashmir legislative assembly in India

Jasmergarh
- Former constituency No. 59 for the Jammu and Kashmir Legislative Assembly

Constituency details
- Country: India
- Region: North India
- State: Jammu and Kashmir
- Established: 1951
- Abolished: 1972
- Total electors: 38,875

Jasmergarh Assembly constituency was an assembly constituency in the India state of Jammu and Kashmir.

== Members of the Legislative Assembly ==
Election	Member	Party
1951	Girdhari Lal Dogra	Jammu & Kashmir National Conference
1957	Girdhari Lal Dogra	Jammu & Kashmir National Conference
1962	Girdhari Lal Dogra	Jammu & Kashmir National Conference
1967	Girdhari Lal Dogra	Indian National Congress
1972	Girdhari Lal Dogra	Indian National Congress

== Election results ==
=== Assembly Election 1972 ===
1972 Jammu and Kashmir Legislative Assembly election: Jasmergarh
Party	Candidate	Votes	%	±%
INC	Girdhari Lal Dogra	14,581	52.60%	▼4.63
ABJS	Baldev Singh	10,248	36.97%	▼2.27
Independent	Durga Dass	2,242	8.09%	New
Independent	Gopal Dass	652	2.35%	New
Margin of victory		4,333	15.63%	▼2.36
Turnout		27,723	73.14%	▼4.50
Registered electors		38,875		▲13.77
INC hold		Swing	▼4.63	

=== Assembly Election 1967 ===
1967 Jammu and Kashmir Legislative Assembly election: Jasmergarh
Party	Candidate	Votes	%	±%
INC	Girdhari Lal Dogra	14,823	57.23%	New
ABJS	Baldev Singh	10,162	39.23%	New
JKNC	C. L. Sharma	660	2.55%	▼55.93
Independent	M. Chand	258	1.00%	New
Margin of victory		4,661	17.99%	▼7.85
Turnout		25,903	78.45%	▼2.69
Registered electors		34,169		▲12.37
INC gain from JKNC		Swing	▼1.25	

=== Assembly Election 1962 ===
1962 Jammu and Kashmir Legislative Assembly election: Jasmergarh
Party	Candidate	Votes	%	±%
JKNC	Girdhari Lal Dogra	13,958	58.48%	New
JPP	Baldev Singh	7,789	32.63%	New
Independent	Behari Lal	1,049	4.39%	New
Democratic National Conference	Kartar Singh	711	2.98%	New
Independent	Ram Datt Dev	362	1.52%	New
Margin of victory		6,169	25.85%	
Turnout		23,869	80.26%	
Registered electors		30,408		
JKNC win (new seat)				
