= Miran Sahib Assembly constituency =

Constituency of the Jammu and Kashmir legislative assembly in India

Miran Sahib
- Former constituency for the Jammu and Kashmir Legislative Assembly

Constituency details
- Country: India
- Region: North India
- State: Jammu and Kashmir
- Established: 1962
- Abolished: 1967
- Total electors: 17,174

Miran Sahib Assembly constituency was an assembly constituency in the India state of Jammu and Kashmir.

== Members of the Legislative Assembly ==
Election	Member	Party
1962	Kulbir Singh	Jammu & Kashmir National Conference

== Election results ==
=== Assembly Election 1962 ===
1962 Jammu and Kashmir Legislative Assembly election : Miran Sahib
Party	Candidate	Votes	%	±%
JKNC	Kulbir Singh	6,317	49.92%	New
Independent	Sant Singh	2,244	17.73%	New
JPP	Bachan Singh Panchhi	1,823	14.41%	New
Independent	Balwant Singh	1,636	12.93%	New
Democratic National Conference	Bhola Nath	451	3.56%	New
Independent	Gurmukh Singh	182	1.44%	New
Margin of victory		4,073	32.19%	
Turnout		12,653	76.03%	
Registered electors		17,174		
JKNC win (new seat)				
