= Jandrah Gharota Assembly constituency =

Constituency of the Jammu and Kashmir legislative assembly in India

Jandrah Gharota
- Former constituency for the Jammu and Kashmir Legislative Assembly

Constituency details
- Country: India
- Region: North India
- State: Jammu and Kashmir
- Established: 1962
- Abolished: 1987
- Total electors: 53,162

Jandrah Gharota Assembly constituency was an assembly constituency in the India state of Jammu and Kashmir.

== Members of the Legislative Assembly ==
| Election | Member | Party |
|---|---|---|
| 1962 | Rounaq Singh | Jammu & Kashmir National Conference |
| 1967 | Rounaq Singh | Indian National Congress |
| 1972 | Shanta Bharti | Indian National Congress |
| 1977 | Dhan Raj Bargotra | Janata Party |
| 1983 | Balwan Singh | Indian National Congress |
| 1987 | Shiv Dev Singh | Indian National Congress |

== Election results ==
=== Assembly Election 1987 ===
1987 Jammu and Kashmir Legislative Assembly election : Jandrah Gharota
| Party | Candidate | Votes | % | ±% |
|---|---|---|---|---|
| INC | Shiv Dev Singh | 13,121 | 34.56% | ▼8.65 |
| Independent | Rattan Chand Gandhi | 8,887 | 23.41% | New |
| JP | Dhan Raj Bargotra | 8,047 | 21.20% | ▲8.36 |
| Independent | Qari Abdul Nabi | 2,905 | 7.65% | New |
| JKNPP | Karan Dev Singh | 1,932 | 5.09% | New |
| BJP | Sohan Lal | 1,729 | 4.55% | ▼0.96 |
| Independent | Raghubir Singh Palwari | 1,341 | 3.53% | New |
| Margin of victory | | 4,234 | 11.15% | ▼17.72 |
| Turnout | | 37,962 | 72.59% | ▲8.37 |
| Registered electors | | 53,162 | | ▲14.66 |
| INC hold | | Swing | ▼8.65 | |

=== Assembly Election 1983 ===
1983 Jammu and Kashmir Legislative Assembly election : Jandrah Gharota
| Party | Candidate | Votes | % | ±% |
|---|---|---|---|---|
| INC | Balwan Singh | 12,628 | 43.21% | ▲15.99 |
| Independent | Rattan Chand | 4,190 | 14.34% | New |
| JP | Dhan Raj Bargotra | 3,751 | 12.83% | ▼25.24 |
| JKNC | Balbir Singh | 3,614 | 12.37% | ▼3.00 |
| BJP | Sohan Lal | 1,612 | 5.52% | New |
| Independent | Noor Ud Din Kataria | 1,213 | 4.15% | New |
| Independent | Karan Dev Singh | 973 | 3.33% | New |
| Independent | Vijay Rattan | 411 | 1.41% | New |
| LKD | Ved Parkash | 335 | 1.15% | New |
| Independent | Sushil Kumar | 229 | 0.78% | New |
| Independent | Nanak Chand | 222 | 0.76% | New |
| Margin of victory | | 8,438 | 28.87% | ▲18.01 |
| Turnout | | 29,225 | 65.09% | ▲3.12 |
| Registered electors | | 46,364 | | ▲23.71 |
| INC gain from JP | | Swing | ▲5.13 | |

=== Assembly Election 1977 ===
1977 Jammu and Kashmir Legislative Assembly election : Jandrah Gharota
| Party | Candidate | Votes | % | ±% |
|---|---|---|---|---|
| JP | Dhan Raj Bargotra | 8,550 | 38.08% | New |
| INC | Ranjit Singh | 6,112 | 27.22% | ▼35.68 |
| JKNC | Choudhary Nurul Din Karatia | 3,450 | 15.36% | New |
| Independent | Jatinder Dev | 3,397 | 15.13% | New |
| Independent | Nanak Chand | 507 | 2.26% | New |
| Independent | Bhagat Ram Sharma | 438 | 1.95% | New |
| Margin of victory | | 2,438 | 10.86% | ▼27.91 |
| Turnout | | 22,454 | 61.07% | ▼4.68 |
| Registered electors | | 37,477 | | ▲49.71 |
| JP gain from INC | | Swing | ▼24.82 | |

=== Assembly Election 1972 ===
1972 Jammu and Kashmir Legislative Assembly election : Jandrah Gharota
| Party | Candidate | Votes | % | ±% |
|---|---|---|---|---|
| INC | Shanta Bharti | 10,172 | 62.90% | ▲3.23 |
| ABJS | Rajinder Singh | 3,903 | 24.14% | ▼2.35 |
| Independent | Ranjit Singh | 2,096 | 12.96% | New |
| Margin of victory | | 6,269 | 38.77% | ▲5.57 |
| Turnout | | 16,171 | 67.04% | ▲1.03 |
| Registered electors | | 25,033 | | ▲14.35 |
| INC hold | | Swing | | |

=== Assembly Election 1967 ===
1967 Jammu and Kashmir Legislative Assembly election : Jandrah Gharota
| Party | Candidate | Votes | % | ±% |
|---|---|---|---|---|
| INC | Rounaq Singh | 8,304 | 59.68% | New |
| ABJS | Rajinder Singh | 3,685 | 26.48% | New |
| JKNC | R. Singh | 964 | 6.93% | ▼43.77 |
| Democratic National Conference | K. Singh | 617 | 4.43% | ▲1.72 |
| Independent | S. Dass | 345 | 2.48% | New |
| Margin of victory | | 4,619 | 33.19% | ▲14.95 |
| Turnout | | 13,915 | 66.36% | ▼1.93 |
| Registered electors | | 21,891 | | ▼18.02 |
| INC gain from JKNC | | Swing | ▲8.98 | |

=== Assembly Election 1962 ===
1962 Jammu and Kashmir Legislative Assembly election : Jandrah Gharota
| Party | Candidate | Votes | % | ±% |
|---|---|---|---|---|
| JKNC | Rounaq Singh | 8,867 | 50.70% | New |
| JPP | Rajinder Singh | 5,677 | 32.46% | New |
| Harijan Mandal | Hari Chand | 1,983 | 11.34% | New |
| Independent | Girdhari Lal | 487 | 2.78% | New |
| Democratic National Conference | Khajur Singh | 475 | 2.72% | New |
| Margin of victory | | 3,190 | 18.24% | |
| Turnout | | 17,489 | 65.61% | |
| Registered electors | | 26,703 | | |
| JKNC win (new seat) | | | | |
