= Jammu South Assembly constituency =

Constituency of the Jammu and Kashmir legislative assembly in India

Jammu South
- Former constituency for the Jammu and Kashmir Legislative Assembly

Constituency details
- Country: India
- Region: North India
- State: Jammu and Kashmir
- Established: 1967
- Abolished: 1972
- Total electors: 31,133

Jammu South Assembly constituency was an assembly constituency in the India state of Jammu and Kashmir.

== Members of the Legislative Assembly ==
| Election | Member | Party |
|---|---|---|
| 1962 | Ram Chand Mahajan | Jammu & Kashmir National Conference |
| 1967 | R. Nath | Bharatiya Jana Sangh |
| 1972 | Chaman Lal Gupta | Bharatiya Jana Sangh |

== Election results ==
=== Assembly Election 1972 ===
1972 Jammu and Kashmir Legislative Assembly election : Jammu South
| Party | Candidate | Votes | % | ±% |
|---|---|---|---|---|
| ABJS | Chaman Lal Gupta | 10,892 | 51.44% | ▼3.53 |
| INC | Amrit Kumar Malhotra | 7,873 | 37.18% | ▲1.72 |
| Independent | Hussan Ara | 534 | 2.52% | New |
| Independent | Som Nath | 361 | 1.70% | New |
| Independent | Dharam Paul | 346 | 1.63% | New |
| SSP | Dhan Raj Dargotra | 228 | 1.08% | New |
| Independent | Parakash Masth | 201 | 0.95% | New |
| Margin of victory | | 3,019 | 14.26% | ▼5.25 |
| Turnout | | 21,175 | 69.27% | ▲1.16 |
| Registered electors | | 31,133 | | ▲8.02 |
| ABJS hold | | Swing | ▼3.53 | |

=== Assembly Election 1967 ===
1967 Jammu and Kashmir Legislative Assembly election : Jammu South
| Party | Candidate | Votes | % | ±% |
|---|---|---|---|---|
| ABJS | R. Nath | 10,590 | 54.96% | New |
| INC | R. Nath | 6,832 | 35.46% | New |
| JKNC | S. R. Sudhir | 1,290 | 6.70% | ▼44.58 |
| Independent | V. N. Gupta | 388 | 2.01% | New |
| Independent | J. Singh | 167 | 0.87% | New |
| Margin of victory | | 3,758 | 19.50% | ▲0.30 |
| Turnout | | 19,267 | 70.26% | ▼3.10 |
| Registered electors | | 28,821 | | ▲10.80 |
| ABJS gain from JKNC | | Swing | ▲3.69 | |

=== Assembly Election 1962 ===
1962 Jammu and Kashmir Legislative Assembly election : Jammu South
| Party | Candidate | Votes | % | ±% |
|---|---|---|---|---|
| JKNC | Ram Chand Mahajan | 9,329 | 51.28% | New |
| JPP | Ram Nath | 5,835 | 32.07% | New |
| Independent | Som Nath | 779 | 4.28% | New |
| PSP | Balraj | 722 | 3.97% | New |
| Democratic National Conference | Amar Chand | 711 | 3.91% | New |
| Independent | Parduman Singh | 660 | 3.63% | New |
| Independent | Ramnik Singh | 158 | 0.87% | New |
| Margin of victory | | 3,494 | 19.20% | |
| Turnout | | 18,194 | 71.01% | |
| Registered electors | | 26,011 | | |
| JKNC win (new seat) | | | | |
