= Tikri Assembly constituency =

Constituency of the Jammu and Kashmir legislative assembly in India

Tikri
- Former constituency for the Jammu and Kashmir Legislative Assembly

Constituency details
- Country: India
- Region: North India
- State: Jammu and Kashmir
- Established: 1962
- Abolished: 1972
- Total electors: 32,205

Tikri Assembly constituency was an assembly constituency in the India state of Jammu and Kashmir.

== Members of the Legislative Assembly ==
Election	Member	Party
Landar Tikri
1962	Shiv Charan	Jammu Praja Parishad
Tikri
1967	Shiv Charan	Bharatiya Jana Sangh
1972	Nirmal Devi	Indian National Congress

== Election results ==
=== Assembly Election 1972 ===
1972 Jammu and Kashmir Legislative Assembly election : Tikri
Party	Candidate	Votes	%	±%
INC	Nirmal Devi	11,929	63.37%	▲20.26
ABJS	Shiv Charan	5,488	29.16%	▼20.23
INC(O)	Rangil Singh	615	3.27%	New
Independent	Jarnail Singh	336	1.79%	New
Independent	Om Prakash	272	1.45%	New
Independent	Hari Krishan	183	0.97%	New
Margin of victory		6,441	34.22%	▲27.95
Turnout		18,823	60.00%	▼1.43
Registered electors		32,205		▲6.70
INC gain from ABJS		Swing	▲13.99	

=== Assembly Election 1967 ===
1967 Jammu and Kashmir Legislative Assembly election : Tikri
Party	Candidate	Votes	%	±%
ABJS	Shiv Charan	8,926	49.39%	New
INC	M. Ram	7,793	43.12%	New
JKNC	H. Chand	568	3.14%	New
Independent	K. Singh	344	1.90%	New
Independent	P. Ram	224	1.24%	New
Independent	K. Singh	219	1.21%	New
Margin of victory		1,133	6.27%	
Turnout		18,074	62.13%	
Registered electors		30,184		
ABJS win (new seat)				

=== Assembly Election 1962 ===
1962 Jammu and Kashmir Legislative Assembly election : Landar Tikri
Party	Candidate	Votes	%	±%
JPP	Shiv Charan	7,595	47.53%	New
JKNC	Faqir Chand	6,929	43.36%	New
Democratic National Conference	Moti Ram	778	4.87%	New
Independent	Durga Dass	573	3.59%	New
Independent	Jia Lal	105	0.66%	New
Margin of victory		666	4.17%	
Turnout		15,980	60.10%	
Registered electors		26,716		
JPP win (new seat)				
