= 1972 Jammu and Kashmir Legislative Assembly election =

Legislative Assembly election in Jammu and Kashmir, India

1972 Jammu and Kashmir state assembly elections
- 17 June 1972

all 75 seats in Legislative Assembly 38 seats needed for a majority
- Registered: 2,297,951
- Turnout: 62.17%
	Majority party	Minority party	Third party
	INC (R)
Party	INC(R)	JIJK	ABJS
Leader since	1971
Last election	61	New	3
Seats won	58	5	3
Seat change	▼3	New	0
Percentage	55.44%	7.18%	9.85%
CM before election
Syed Mir Qasim
INC
Elected CM
Syed Mir Qasim
INC

Elections to the Jammu and Kashmir Legislative Assembly were held in January 1972 to elect members of 75 constituencies in Jammu and Kashmir, India. The Indian National Congress won the popular vote and a majority of seats and Syed Mir Qasim was appointed as the Chief Minister of Jammu and Kashmir. After this election, women entered the Jammu and Kashmir assembly for the first time. Ten women had filed their nominations, six of them contested and four won their seats. This made the percentage of women legislators 5.33% in the Jammu Kashmir assembly.

== Result ==
Party	Votes	%	Seats	+/–
Indian National Congress	764,492	55.44	58	▼3
Bharatiya Jana Sangh	135,778	9.85	3	0
Jamaat-e-Islami Kashmir	98,985	7.18	5	New
Others	10,689	0.78	0	0
Independents	369,062	26.76	9	▼6
Total	1,379,006	100.00	75	0
Valid votes	1,379,006	96.52		
Invalid/blank votes	49,689	3.48		
Total votes	1,428,695	100.00		
Registered voters/turnout	2,297,951	62.17		
Source: ECI

== Results by constituency ==
Winner, runner-up, voter turnout, and victory margin in every constituency
Assembly Constituency		Turnout	Winner				Runner Up				Margin
#k	Names	%	Candidate	Party	Votes	%	Candidate	Party	Votes	%	Margin
1	Karnah	74.92%	Mohammed Yaseen Shah	Independent	10,310	42.91%	Mohammed Yunis Khan	INC	9,652	40.17%	658
2	Kupwara	60.74%	Ghulam Mohammed Shah	INC	10,988	74.79%	Mohammed Sultan Tantrey	Independent	2,331	15.87%	8,657
3	Lolab	65.38%	Saif Ullah Bhat	INC	9,424	53.28%	Nabi Shah	Independent	5,638	31.87%	3,786
4	Bandipora	65.64%	M. A. Khan	INC	14,148	60.46%	Mohammed Sultan Shah	JI	6,774	28.95%	7,374
5	Handwara	86.1%	Abdul Ghani Lone	INC	24,291	88.41%	Sharif Ud Din	Independent	3,183	11.59%	21,108
6	Harl	65.27%	Abdul Gani Mir	INC	12,474	57.51%	Syed Alishah Jeelani	JI	4,511	20.8%	7,963
7	Rafiabad	66.45%	Mohammed Yosuf Dar	INC	12,971	61.62%	Abdul Ahmad Mir	Independent	8,079	38.38%	4,892
8	Baramulla	50.6%	Mohammed Maqbool Mahjoo	INC	7,809	45.37%	Abdul Hamid Khan	Independent	5,517	32.06%	2,292
9	Sopore	65.22%	Syed Ali Shah Geelani	JI	11,396	60.35%	Ghulam Nabi Mircha	INC	7,486	39.65%	3,910
10	Pattan	67.38%	Ghulam Qadir Bhdar	INC	15,002	76.77%	Yousuf Shah	Independent	2,508	12.83%	12,494
11	Sonawari	76.51%	Abdul Aziz Parray	INC	25,121	85.17%	Abdul Khaliq Parray	JI	2,819	9.56%	22,302
12	Gulmarg	60.31%	Surinder Singh	INC	8,987	50.91%	Mirza Ghulam Ahmad Beg	Independent	3,502	19.84%	5,485
13	Uri	62.78%	Mohammad Shafi	Independent	9,543	62.73%	Mohammed Mazaffar Khan	INC	4,916	32.31%	4,627
14	Kangan	76.75%	Mian Bashir Ahmed	INC	16,593	79.66%	Ahad Bhat	JI	3,974	19.08%	12,619
15	Ganderbal	62.43%	Mohammed Maqbool Bhat	INC	11,891	66.81%	Ghulam Mohammed Ganai	JI	3,554	19.97%	8,337
16	Amira Kadal	59.85%	Zainab Begum	INC	7,446	38.12%	Mohammed Farooq	JI	7,374	37.76%	72
17	Habba Kadal	54.93%	Ghulam Mohammed Butt	Independent	5,069	35.29%	Tikalal	ABJS	3,443	23.97%	1,626
18	Tankipora	59.15%	Ghulam Nabi Nowsheshri	JI	5,121	33.77%	Mohan Kishen Tikoo	Independent	3,942	25.99%	1,179
19	Khanyar	62.02%	Saif Ud Din Qari	JI	9,530	60.97%	Gazy Abdul Rahman	Independent	2,176	13.92%	7,354
20	Safa Kadal	63.72%	Abdul Rashid Kabli	Independent	8,050	39.53%	Mir Mukhtar Kanth	Independent	5,970	29.31%	2,080
21	Zadibal	60.53%	Salim Anwar	Independent	6,173	33.02%	Aga Syed Afzil Jalali	Independent	3,491	18.68%	2,682
22	Hazratbal	63.5%	Sofi Ghulam Ahamad	Independent	8,069	38.67%	Mohammed Yehya Siddiqi	INC	7,777	37.27%	292
23	Beerwah	-	Abdul Khaliq Mir	INC	Elected Unopposed						
24	Khan Sahib	62.31%	Ghulam Qadir War	INC	15,998	85.85%	Ghulam Ahamad Parry	Independent	2,094	11.24%	13,904
25	Budgam	62.26%	Ali Mohammed Mir	INC	8,448	48.87%	Aga Sayed Ali Shah Safvi	Independent	5,918	34.24%	2,530
26	Charari Sharief	84.14%	Abdul Qayoom	INC	16,788	77.57%	Abdul Rahim Rather	Independent	2,744	12.68%	14,044
27	Chadoora	87.57%	Mir Mustafa	INC	20,774	88.43%	Samad Dar	Independent	1,783	7.59%	18,991
28	Rajpora	72.39%	Bashir Ahmed Magrey	INC	9,079	43.21%	Ghulam Qadir Mir	Independent	8,248	39.26%	831
29	Pulwama	72.55%	Sona Ullah Dar	INC	10,002	51.09%	Ghulam Hassan Mir	Independent	4,978	25.43%	5,024
30	Pampore	71.%	Ghulam Hassan Mansooda	INC	9,269	53.34%	Peerzada Ghulam Jeelani	Independent	5,868	33.77%	3,401
31	Tral	75.09%	Ali Muhammad Naik	Independent	11,594	64.1%	Ghulam Hassan Beg	INC	4,195	23.19%	7,399
32	Shopian	68.85%	Abdul Majid Bandey	Independent	8,401	42.11%	Haki Ghulam Nabi Shah	JI	6,388	32.02%	2,013
33	Noorabad	79.4%	Abdul Aziz Zargar	INC	23,815	93.96%	Abdul Aziz Sheikh	Independent	1,454	5.74%	22,361
34	Devsar	66.78%	Ghulam Hassan Parry	Independent	9,406	49.94%	Manohar Nath Kaul	INC	8,055	42.76%	1,351
35	Kulgam	68.63%	Abdul Razak Mir	JI	8,137	38.66%	Habibulla Lawi	Independent	7,094	33.71%	1,043
36	Nandi	65.44%	Ali Mohammed Dar	JI	7,201	39.28%	Ghulam Hassan Rathir	INC	4,773	26.04%	2,428
37	Pahalgam	80.47%	Makhan Lal Fotedar	INC	16,628	78.63%	Hami Ullah	Independent	4,520	21.37%	12,108
38	Srigufwara–Bijbehara	69.81%	Saif Ud Din Dar	INC	14,300	73.02%	Mohammed Sultan	JI	5,285	26.98%	9,015
39	Anantnag	85.59%	Shamsuddin	INC	7,401	33.71%	Piary Lal Handoo	Independent	5,383	24.52%	2,018
40	Kothar	80.51%	Mohammed Ashraf Khan	INC	14,901	70.6%	Mohammed Maqubool Dar	Independent	6,205	29.4%	8,696
41	Verinag	-	Syed Mir Qasim	INC	Elected Unopposed						
42	Naubug	-	Pir Husan Qasim	INC	Elected Unopposed						
43	Leh	75.75%	Sonam Wangyal	INC	11,041	49.44%	Koushok Tokdan	Independent	10,670	47.78%	371
44	Kargil	-	Kachoo Mohammed Ali Khan	INC	Elected Unopposed						
45	Kishtwar	54.91%	Pir Nizam Ud Din	INC	9,283	60.51%	Ghulam Hussain Arman	Independent	3,796	24.74%	5,487
46	Inderwal	43.73%	Khan Abdul Gani Goni	INC	9,721	80.29%	Abdul Rashid	JI	1,412	11.66%	8,309
47	Bhaderwah	34.82%	Bodh Raj	INC	6,114	65.28%	Narain Dass	ABJS	2,885	30.8%	3,229
48	Doda	46.5%	Hans Raj Dogra	INC	4,833	39.87%	Ghulam Qadir Wani	Independent	3,857	31.82%	976
49	Ramban	50.61%	Mohammed Akhtar Nizami	INC	7,870	60.31%	Labhu Ram	ABJS	2,692	20.63%	5,178
50	Banihal	-	Hajra Begum	INC	Elected Unopposed						
51	Gulabgarh	71.4%	Mohammed Ayub Khan	INC	22,638	90.26%	Abdul Ghani	Independent	2,213	8.82%	20,425
52	Reasi	70.83%	Rishi Kumar Kaushal	ABJS	10,480	54.74%	L. D. Thakar	INC	8,050	42.05%	2,430
53	Tikri	60.%	Nirmal Devi	INC	11,929	63.37%	Shiv Charan	ABJS	5,488	29.16%	6,441
54	Udhampur	63.04%	Dev Datt	INC	12,111	59.45%	Paras Ram	ABJS	7,107	34.89%	5,004
55	Ramnagar	51.05%	Chandhu Lal	INC	10,963	64.08%	Amar Nath	ABJS	5,442	31.81%	5,521
56	Basohli	58.32%	Mangat Ram Sharma	INC	9,482	56.43%	Baldev Singh	ABJS	5,871	34.94%	3,611
57	Billawar	65.28%	Randhir Singh	INC	9,575	48.25%	Dhian Singh	ABJS	8,554	43.1%	1,021
58	Kathua	68.32%	Panjaboo Ram Alias Singh	INC	11,539	55.76%	Ved Prakash	Independent	9,155	44.24%	2,384
59	Jasmergarh	73.14%	Girdhari Lal Dogra	INC	14,581	52.6%	Baldev Singh	ABJS	10,248	36.97%	4,333
60	Samba	60.07%	Gouri Shankar	INC	9,700	54.91%	Gian Chand	ABJS	5,882	33.3%	3,818
61	Ramgarh	65.75%	Baldev Sharma	INC	11,849	60.39%	Jagdish Rai	ABJS	6,091	31.04%	5,758
62	Bishnah	75.42%	Parma Nand	INC	14,971	64.%	Shiv Ram	ABJS	6,489	27.74%	8,482
63	Ranbir Singh Pora–Jammu South	80.84%	Rangil Singh	INC	13,577	60.46%	Sain Dass	Independent	5,206	23.18%	8,371
64	Jandrah Gharota	67.04%	Shanta Bharti	INC	10,172	62.9%	Rajinder Singh	ABJS	3,903	24.14%	6,269
65	Marh	68.01%	Sushil Kumar	INC	7,406	51.44%	Tulsi Ram	ABJS	4,201	29.18%	3,205
66	Jammu Cantonment	69.17%	Trilochan Dutta	INC	11,905	55.1%	Ram Lal	Independent	2,905	13.44%	9,000
67	Jammu South	69.27%	Chaman Lal Gupta	ABJS	10,892	51.44%	Amrit Kumar Malhotra	INC	7,873	37.18%	3,019
68	Jammu North	65.59%	Sheikh Abdul Rehman	ABJS	12,439	60.23%	Nilam Ber Dev Sharma	INC	7,590	36.75%	4,849
69	Akhnoor	78.45%	Dharam Pal	INC	16,364	75.01%	Bakshi Thakur Das	ABJS	3,577	16.4%	12,787
70	Chhamb	77.87%	Diwakar Singh	INC	12,495	55.75%	Ram Nath	ABJS	5,558	24.8%	6,937
71	Nowshera	63.53%	Beli Ram	INC	8,563	44.04%	Nand Kumar	Independent	8,512	43.77%	51
72	Darhal	66.66%	Abdul Rashid Mirza	INC	16,848	64.08%	Gulzar Ahmed	Independent	8,073	30.71%	8,775
73	Rajouri	53.88%	Talid Hussain	INC	14,159	84.99%	Roop Lal	ABJS	1,835	11.02%	12,324
74	Mendhar	66.6%	Choudhry Mohammed Aslam	INC	22,094	67.47%	Mohammed Sayeed Beig	Independent	10,654	32.53%	11,440
75	Poonch Haveli	46.59%	Ghulam Mohammad Mir	INC	10,706	63.28%	Ghulam Ahmed	Independent	3,117	18.42%	7,589

== See also ==
- List of constituencies of the Jammu and Kashmir Legislative Assembly
- 1972 elections in India
