= Manohar Nath Kaul =

Manohar Nath Kaul (27 May 1923 – 19 December 2001) was an Indian politician. He was born in 1922 in the Kashmiri Brahmin family of Sudershan Kaul in Nawakadal Srinagar. After finishing his M.A L.L.B from Aligarh Muslim University he joined active politics in 1947.

== Political career ==
A two time MLA, Kaul was inducted as a revenue minister in Khwaja Shams-ud-Din's cabinet in 1963 for a short stint. He was again inducted into Ghulam Mohammed Sadiq's cabinet from 1969 to 1972, and was given almost half a dozen portfolios mainly Revenue, excise, irrigation and flood control, food and supplies. He also remained vice president of the Jammu and Kashmir Pradesh Congress Committee (JKPCC) for more than a decade, apart from being the Hindu head of the congress in Pulwama and Anantag for more than 15 years. The former minister used to conduct conventions in valley to educate people about the ideology and agenda of the congress party along with Ghulam Mohammad Sadiq and Bakshi Ghulam Mohammad. Whenever a delegation used to come from Delhi, Kaul used to interact with the same. He also remained General Secretary of JKPCC from 1973 to 1977. He has also remained MLC from 1987 to 1992.

== Electoral performance ==
Election	Constituency	Party	Result	Votes %	Opposition Candidate	Opposition Party	Opposition vote %	Ref
1983	Devsar, Jammu and Kashmir	INC	Lost	33.72%	Ghulam Ahmad Shah	JKNC	53.68%	
1977	Devsar, Jammu and Kashmir	INC	Lost	18.58%	Ghulam Nabi Kochak	JKNC	59.95%	
1972	Devsar, Jammu and Kashmir	INC	Lost	42.76%	Ghulam Hassan Parry	Independent	49.94%	
1967	Devsar, Jammu and Kashmir	INC	Won	Elected Unopposed				
1962	Kothar	JKNC	Won	Elected Unopposed				
