= Kathua Assembly constituency =

Constituency of the Jammu and Kashmir Legislative Assembly

Coordinates: 32.39°N 75.52°E

Kathua
- Constituency No. 67 for the Jammu and Kashmir Legislative Assembly

Constituency details
- Country: India
- State: Jammu and Kashmir
- District: Kathua
- Lok Sabha constituency: Udhampur
- Established: 1962
- Reservation: SC

Member of Legislative Assembly
- Incumbent Bharat Bhushan
- Party: BJP
- Alliance: NDA
- Elected year: 2024

Kathua Assembly constituency is one of the 90 constituencies in the Jammu and Kashmir Legislative Assembly of Jammu and Kashmir a north state of India. Kathua is also part of Udhampur Lok Sabha constituency.

== Members of the Legislative Assembly ==
Election	Member	Party
1962	Randhir Singh	Jammu and Kashmir National Conference
1967	Panjaboo Ram Singh	Indian National Congress
1972	Panjaboo Ram Singh	Indian National Congress
1977	Dhain Chand	Janata Party
1983	Sanji Ram	Indian National Congress
1987	Om Parkash	Indian National Congress
1996	Sagar Chand	Bahujan Samaj Party
2002	Jatinder Singh	Democratic Movement
2008	Charanjit Singh	Independent
2014	Rajiv Jasrotia	Bharatiya Janata Party
2024	Bharat Bhushan	Bharatiya Janata Party

== Election results ==
=== Assembly Election 2024 ===
2024 Jammu and Kashmir Legislative Assembly election : Kathua
Party	Candidate	Votes	%	±%
BJP	Dr. Bharat Bhushan	45,944	55.19%	▲16.08
BSP	Sandeep Majotra	33,827	40.64%	▲8.99
JKNC	Subash Chander	1,597	1.92%	New
Independent	Khushboo Bhagat	680	0.82%	New
NOTA	None of the Above	733	0.88%	▲0.58
Margin of victory		12,117	14.56%	▲7.09
Turnout		83,241	76.60%	▼4.06
Registered electors		1,08,666		▼3.90
BJP hold		Swing	▲16.08	

=== Assembly Election 2014 ===
2014 Jammu and Kashmir Legislative Assembly election : Kathua
Party	Candidate	Votes	%	±%
BJP	Rajiv Jasrotia	35,670	39.11%	▲28.43
BSP	Som Raj Majotra	28,864	31.65%	▲9.02
Independent	Charanjit Singh	13,242	14.52%	New
INC	Jatinder Singh Alias Babu Singh	7,195	7.89%	▼0.28
JKPDP	Subash Chander	1,305	1.43%	New
Independent	Robin Ramkrishan Alias Robin Sharma	1,088	1.19%	New
CPI	Manoj Kumar	760	0.83%	New
NOTA	None of the Above	272	0.30%	New
Margin of victory		6,806	7.46%	▲4.27
Turnout		91,205	80.66%	▲7.68
Registered electors		1,13,075		▲11.41
BJP gain from Independent		Swing	▲13.29	

=== Assembly Election 2008 ===
2008 Jammu and Kashmir Legislative Assembly election : Kathua
Party	Candidate	Votes	%	±%
Independent	Charanjit Singh	19,123	25.82%	New
BSP	Som Raj Majotra	16,761	22.63%	▲1.84
Independent	Jatinder Singh Alias Babu Singh	10,887	14.70%	New
BJP	Sain Dass	7,913	10.68%	▼4.57
INC	Lal Singh	6,053	8.17%	▲0.18
Independent	Naresh Kumar	3,752	5.07%	New
JKNC	Ravinder Singh Slathia	2,126	2.87%	▼3.55
Margin of victory		2,362	3.19%	▼1.59
Turnout		74,070	72.98%	▲16.00
Registered electors		1,01,495		▼9.67
Independent gain from DM		Swing	▲0.25	

=== Assembly Election 2002 ===
2002 Jammu and Kashmir Legislative Assembly election : Kathua
Party	Candidate	Votes	%	±%
DM	Jatinder Singh	16,366	25.56%	New
BSP	Sagar Chand	13,307	20.79%	▼4.47
BJP	Lal Chand Sharma	9,767	15.26%	▲3.52
Independent	Prof. Sain Dass	6,325	9.88%	New
INC	Rattan Chand Krottara	5,118	7.99%	▼4.67
JKNC	Ajit Kumar	4,111	6.42%	▲0.79
Independent	Harmohan Singh Andotra	1,336	2.09%	New
Margin of victory		3,059	4.78%	▲2.43
Turnout		64,021	57.00%	▼6.43
Registered electors		1,12,359		▲48.35
DM gain from BSP		Swing	▲0.31	

=== Assembly Election 1996 ===
1996 Jammu and Kashmir Legislative Assembly election : Kathua
Party	Candidate	Votes	%	±%
BSP	Sagar Chand	12,130	25.26%	New
Independent	Lal Chand Sharma	11,001	22.91%	New
INC	Subash Chander	6,082	12.66%	▼36.94
BJP	Chaggar Singh	5,636	11.74%	▼18.30
Independent	Th. Baldev Singh	5,167	10.76%	New
JKNC	Kishor Kumar	2,703	5.63%	New
Independent	S. Sujan Singh	1,694	3.53%	New
Margin of victory		1,129	2.35%	▼17.22
Turnout		48,026	64.73%	▼5.38
Registered electors		75,739		▲53.81
BSP gain from INC		Swing	▼24.35	

=== Assembly Election 1987 ===
1987 Jammu and Kashmir Legislative Assembly election : Kathua
Party	Candidate	Votes	%	±%
INC	Om Parkash	16,805	49.61%	▼2.87
BJP	Kulbhushan Kumar	10,175	30.04%	▲8.91
Independent	Roop Lal	3,260	9.62%	New
Independent	Dhian Chand	1,081	3.19%	New
Independent	Sagar Chand	731	2.16%	New
JKNPP	Hans Raj	482	1.42%	New
LKD	Nardev Singh	412	1.22%	▲0.26
Margin of victory		6,630	19.57%	▼11.78
Turnout		33,876	70.08%	▲11.18
Registered electors		49,243		▲1.50
INC hold		Swing	▼2.87	

=== Assembly Election 1983 ===
1983 Jammu and Kashmir Legislative Assembly election : Kathua
Party	Candidate	Votes	%	±%
INC	Sanji Ram	14,667	52.48%	▲12.05
BJP	Baldev Raj	5,905	21.13%	New
JKNC	Dhain Chand	4,641	16.60%	▲1.94
Independent	Anchal Singh	1,382	4.94%	New
Independent	Chaman Lal	1,089	3.90%	New
LKD	Nardev Singh	266	0.95%	New
Margin of victory		8,762	31.35%	▲26.87
Turnout		27,950	58.62%	▼2.22
Registered electors		48,513		▲30.06
INC gain from JP		Swing	▲7.57	

=== Assembly Election 1977 ===
1977 Jammu and Kashmir Legislative Assembly election : Kathua
Party	Candidate	Votes	%	±%
JP	Dhain Chand	10,022	44.90%	New
INC	Punjabu Ram Alias Punjab Singh	9,023	40.43%	▼15.33
JKNC	Ved Parkash	3,274	14.67%	New
Margin of victory		999	4.48%	▼7.04
Turnout		22,319	60.96%	▼6.59
Registered electors		37,300		▲19.72
JP gain from INC		Swing		

=== Assembly Election 1972 ===
1972 Jammu and Kashmir Legislative Assembly election : Kathua
Party	Candidate	Votes	%	±%
INC	Panjaboo Ram Alias Singh	11,539	55.76%	▲2.02
Independent	Ved Prakash	9,155	44.24%	New
Margin of victory		2,384	11.52%	▼10.90
Turnout		20,694	68.32%	▲2.59
Registered electors		31,155		▲0.84
INC hold		Swing		

=== Assembly Election 1967 ===
1967 Jammu and Kashmir Legislative Assembly election : Kathua
Party	Candidate	Votes	%	±%
INC	Panjaboo Ram Alias Singh	10,598	53.74%	New
ABJS	K. Chand	6,176	31.32%	New
JKNC	V. Parkash	2,185	11.08%	▼44.25
Democratic National Conference	P. Chand	763	3.87%	▲1.13
Margin of victory		4,422	22.42%	▼6.77
Turnout		19,722	66.17%	▼12.01
Registered electors		30,895		▲31.95
INC gain from JKNC		Swing	▼1.60	

=== Assembly Election 1962 ===
1962 Jammu and Kashmir Legislative Assembly election : Kathua
Party	Candidate	Votes	%	±%
JKNC	Randhir Singh	9,826	55.33%	New
JPP	Chagar Singh	4,642	26.14%	New
Harijan Mandal	Major Singh	1,305	7.35%	New
Independent	Shamsher Singh	1,004	5.65%	New
Independent	Vidya Parkash	494	2.78%	New
Democratic National Conference	Saran Singh	487	2.74%	New
Margin of victory		5,184	29.19%	
Turnout		17,758	75.86%	
Registered electors		23,414		
JKNC win (new seat)				

== See also ==
- Kathua
- List of constituencies of Jammu and Kashmir Legislative Assembly
