= Arnas Assembly constituency =

Constituency of the Jammu and Kashmir legislative assembly in India

Arnas
- Former constituency for the Jammu and Kashmir Legislative Assembly

Constituency details
- Country: India
- Region: North India
- State: Jammu and Kashmir
- Established: 1962
- Abolished: 1967
- Total electors: 28,965

Arnas was an assembly constituency in the India state of Jammu and Kashmir.

== Members of the Legislative Assembly ==
Election	Member	Party
1962	Mohammad Ayub Khan	Jammu & Kashmir National Conference

== Election results ==
=== Assembly Election 1962 ===
1962 Jammu and Kashmir Legislative Assembly election : Arnas
Party	Candidate	Votes	%	±%
JKNC	Mohammad Ayub Khan	21,378	95.74%	New
JPP	Lakhmi Chand	951	4.26%	New
Margin of victory		20,427	91.48%	
Turnout		22,329	80.84%	
Registered electors		28,965		
JKNC win (new seat)				

== See also ==
- Gool Arnas Assembly constituency
