= Safa Kadal Assembly constituency =

Constituency of the Jammu and Kashmir legislative assembly in India

Safa Kadal
- Former constituency for the Jammu and Kashmir Legislative Assembly

Constituency details
- Country: India
- Region: North India
- State: Jammu and Kashmir
- Established: 1951
- Abolished: 1972
- Total electors: 33,409

Safa Kadal Assembly constituency was an assembly constituency in the Indian state of Jammu and Kashmir.

== Members of the Legislative Assembly ==
Election	Member	Party
1951	Bakshi Ghulam Mohammad	Jammu & Kashmir National Conference
1957	Bakshi Ghulam Mohammad	Jammu & Kashmir National Conference
1962	Bakshi Ghulam Mohammad	Jammu & Kashmir National Conference
1967	Bakshi Ghulam Mohammad	Jammu & Kashmir National Conference
1972	Abdul Rashid Kabli	Independent politician

== Election results ==
=== Assembly Election 1972 ===
1972 Jammu and Kashmir Legislative Assembly election: Safa Kadal
Party	Candidate	Votes	%	±%
Independent	Abdul Rashid Kabli	8,050	39.53%	New
Independent	Mir Mukhtar Kanth	5,970	29.31%	New
INC	Ghulam Mohiuddin Salati	2,539	12.47%	▼16.87
JI	Ghulam Nabi Siddiqi	1,763	8.66%	New
Independent	Mohammed Jamal Wani	605	2.97%	New
Independent	Mohammed Abdullah Sofi	595	2.92%	New
Independent	Mohammed Azim	586	2.88%	New
Margin of victory		2,080	10.21%	▼31.12
Turnout		20,366	63.72%	▲36.55
Registered electors		33,409		▲26.44
Independent gain from JKNC		Swing	▼31.14	

=== Assembly Election 1967 ===
1967 Jammu and Kashmir Legislative Assembly election: Safa Kadal
Party	Candidate	Votes	%	±%
JKNC	Bakshi Ghulam Mohammad	4,558	70.67%	New
INC	M. M. Salali	1,892	29.33%	New
Margin of victory		2,666	41.33%	
Turnout		6,450	24.96%	▲24.41
Registered electors		26,423		▲49.05
JKNC hold		Swing		

=== Assembly Election 1962 ===
1962 Jammu and Kashmir Legislative Assembly election: Safa Kadal
Party	Candidate	Votes	%	±%
JKNC	Bakshi Ghulam Mohammad	Unopposed		
Registered electors		17,728		
JKNC win (new seat)				
