= Billawar Assembly constituency =

Constituency of the Jammu and Kashmir legislative assembly in India

Coordinates: 32.613°N 75.604°E

Billawar
- Constituency No. 64 for the Jammu and Kashmir Legislative Assembly

Constituency details
- Country: India
- State: Jammu and Kashmir
- District: Kathua
- Lok Sabha constituency: Udhampur
- Established: 1962

Member of Legislative Assembly
- Incumbent Satish Kumar Sharma
- Party: BJP
- Alliance: NDA
- Elected year: 2024

Billawar Assembly constituency is one of the 90 constituencies in the Jammu and Kashmir Legislative Assembly of Jammu and Kashmir a north state of India. Billawar is also part of Udhampur Lok Sabha constituency.

== Members of the Legislative Assembly ==
Election	Member	Party
1962	Ram Chander Khajuria	Jammu & Kashmir National Conference
1967	Balbir Singh	Indian National Congress
1972	Randhir Singh	Indian National Congress
1996	Balbir Singh	Jammu & Kashmir National Conference
2002	Manohar Lal Sharma	Independent
2008	Manohar Lal Sharma	Indian National Congress
2014	Nirmal Kumar Singh	Bharatiya Janata Party
2024	Satish Kumar Sharma	Bharatiya Janata Party

== Election results ==
=== Assembly Election 2024 ===
2024 Jammu and Kashmir Legislative Assembly election : Billawar
Party	Candidate	Votes	%	±%
BJP	Satish Kumar Sharma	44,629	64.38%	▲6.09
INC	Manohar Lal Sharma	23,261	33.56%	▼0.62
BSP	Sanjay Kumar	595	0.86%	▼0.26
NOTA	None of the Above	525	0.76%	▲0.20
Margin of victory		21,368	30.83%	▲6.71
Turnout		69,319	73.24%	▼3.91
Registered electors		94,651		▼2.02
BJP hold		Swing	▲6.09	

=== Assembly Election 2014 ===
2014 Jammu and Kashmir Legislative Assembly election : Billawar
Party	Candidate	Votes	%	±%
BJP	Dr. Nirmal Kumar Singh	43,447	58.30%	▲35.99
INC	Dr. Manohar Lal Sharma	25,472	34.18%	▼1.60
JKNC	Sanjeev Khajuria	3,084	4.14%	▼10.97
BSP	Naresh Kumar	834	1.12%	▼1.89
NOTA	None of the Above	414	0.56%	New
Margin of victory		17,975	24.12%	▲10.64
Turnout		74,527	77.15%	▲6.25
Registered electors		96,599		▲10.08
BJP gain from INC		Swing	▲22.51	

=== Assembly Election 2008 ===
2008 Jammu and Kashmir Legislative Assembly election : Billawar
Party	Candidate	Votes	%	±%
INC	Manohar Lal Sharma	22,262	35.78%	▲16.13
BJP	Satish Kumar Sharma	13,879	22.31%	New
JKNC	Sanjeev Khajuria	9,398	15.11%	▲9.93
Independent	Balbir Singh	6,387	10.27%	New
Independent	Pankaj Dogra	3,834	6.16%	New
BSP	Kartar Singh	1,871	3.01%	▲1.17
JKNPP	Hari Chand Jalmeria	1,575	2.53%	▼0.42
Independent	Ashok Kumar Jasrotia	601	0.97%	New
Independent	Sunil Singh	583	0.94%	New
SP	Subash Chander	567	0.91%	New
Margin of victory		8,383	13.47%	▼14.65
Turnout		62,215	70.90%	▲7.10
Registered electors		87,754		▲8.11
INC gain from Independent		Swing	▼11.99	

=== Assembly Election 2002 ===
2002 Jammu and Kashmir Legislative Assembly election : Billawar
Party	Candidate	Votes	%	±%
Independent	Manohar Lal Sharma	24,736	47.77%	New
INC	Balbir Singh	10,175	19.65%	▼16.60
Independent	Kashmir Singh	7,369	14.23%	New
JKNC	Suram Singh	2,680	5.18%	▼14.86
JKNPP	Govind Ram	1,526	2.95%	▼31.59
NCP	Hukam Chand	1,142	2.21%	New
BSP	Oma Datt Manhas	953	1.84%	▼0.02
Independent	Hari Chand Jalmaria	907	1.75%	New
Independent	Sudesh Kumar	706	1.36%	New
SS	Kulbushan Gupta	491	0.95%	New
Independent	Mohinder Kumar	465	0.90%	New
Margin of victory		14,561	28.12%	▲26.40
Turnout		51,783	63.90%	▲2.02
Registered electors		81,170		▲36.13
Independent gain from INC		Swing	▲11.52	

=== Assembly Election 1996 ===
1996 Jammu and Kashmir Legislative Assembly election : Billawar
Party	Candidate	Votes	%	±%
INC	Balbir Singh	13,354	36.25%	▼22.74
JKNPP	Rajinder Singh	12,722	34.54%	▲30.14
JKNC	Suram Singh	7,379	20.03%	New
Independent	Abdul Majid	1,589	4.31%	New
BSP	Karam Din Chopra	687	1.87%	New
BJP	Kashmir Singh	573	1.56%	▼22.21
Independent	Kamal Kumar Dubey	315	0.86%	New
Margin of victory		632	1.72%	▼33.51
Turnout		36,835	62.45%	▲1.93
Registered electors		59,629		▲18.72
INC hold		Swing	▼22.74	

=== Assembly Election 1987 ===
1987 Jammu and Kashmir Legislative Assembly election : Billawar
Party	Candidate	Votes	%	±%
INC	Swram Singh	17,731	58.99%	▲15.61
BJP	Loknath Sangra	7,143	23.76%	▲16.01
Independent	Abdul Ahad	1,694	5.64%	New
JKNPP	Jagdish Singh	1,321	4.39%	New
Independent	Surjeet Singh	992	3.30%	New
Independent	Tek Chand	379	1.26%	New
LKD	Jiwanand	338	1.12%	New
Independent	Munshi	288	0.96%	New
Margin of victory		10,588	35.23%	▲8.18
Turnout		30,058	60.71%	▲0.28
Registered electors		50,228		▲7.65
INC hold		Swing	▲15.61	

=== Assembly Election 1983 ===
1983 Jammu and Kashmir Legislative Assembly election : Billawar
Party	Candidate	Votes	%	±%
INC	Puran Singh	12,054	43.38%	▲14.15
JKNC	Kashmir Singh	4,539	16.33%	▲6.15
Independent	Rattan Chand	3,414	12.28%	New
BJP	Dhian Singh	2,156	7.76%	New
Independent	Jagdish Singh	1,851	6.66%	New
Independent	Krishnadev Singh	945	3.40%	New
Independent	Kartar Chand	733	2.64%	New
Independent	Labhu Ram	399	1.44%	New
Independent	Hari Chand	393	1.41%	New
Independent	Joginder Paul	332	1.19%	New
JP	Raj Kumar	172	0.62%	▼56.95
Margin of victory		7,515	27.04%	▼1.31
Turnout		27,790	60.65%	▲6.12
Registered electors		46,659		▲16.45
INC gain from JP		Swing	▼14.20	

=== Assembly Election 1977 ===
1977 Jammu and Kashmir Legislative Assembly election : Billawar
Party	Candidate	Votes	%	±%
JP	Dhian Singh	12,328	57.57%	New
INC	Thakur Randhir Singh	6,258	29.23%	▼19.02
JKNC	Kashmir Singh	2,180	10.18%	New
Independent	Krishan Datt	411	1.92%	New
Independent	Rameshwar Chandel	236	1.10%	New
Margin of victory		6,070	28.35%	▲23.20
Turnout		21,413	54.25%	▼10.25
Registered electors		40,069		▲28.60
JP gain from INC		Swing	▲9.32	

=== Assembly Election 1972 ===
1972 Jammu and Kashmir Legislative Assembly election : Billawar
Party	Candidate	Votes	%	±%
INC	Randhir Singh	9,575	48.25%	▼10.23
ABJS	Dhian Singh	8,554	43.10%	▲8.08
INC(O)	Ram Dass	586	2.95%	New
Independent	Ram Chand	523	2.64%	New
Independent	Rasal Singh	339	1.71%	New
Independent	Ghulam Rasool	199	1.00%	New
Margin of victory		1,021	5.14%	▼18.31
Turnout		19,845	65.28%	▼5.22
Registered electors		31,158		▲17.23
INC hold		Swing	▼10.23	

=== Assembly Election 1967 ===
1967 Jammu and Kashmir Legislative Assembly election : Billawar
Party	Candidate	Votes	%	±%
INC	Balbir Singh	10,711	58.48%	New
ABJS	Dhian Singh	6,415	35.03%	New
JKNC	B. Lal	699	3.82%	▼45.97
Independent	B. Ram	490	2.68%	New
Margin of victory		4,296	23.46%	▲20.20
Turnout		18,315	71.01%	▲7.71
Registered electors		26,578		▲3.56
INC gain from JKNC		Swing	▲8.70	

=== Assembly Election 1962 ===
1962 Jammu and Kashmir Legislative Assembly election : Billawar
Party	Candidate	Votes	%	±%
JKNC	Ram Chander Khajuria	7,819	49.78%	New
JPP	Dhian Singh	7,307	46.52%	New
Independent	Ali Akbar	301	1.92%	New
Independent	Jarasindh Paul	279	1.78%	New
Margin of victory		512	3.26%	
Turnout		15,706	62.89%	
Registered electors		25,664		
JKNC win (new seat)				

== See also ==
- Billawar
- List of constituencies of Jammu and Kashmir Legislative Assembly
