= Doru Shahbad Assembly constituency =

Constituency of the Jammu and Kashmir legislative assembly in India

Doru Shahbad
- Former constituency for the Jammu and Kashmir Legislative Assembly

Constituency details
- Country: India
- Region: North India
- State: Jammu and Kashmir
- Established: 1962
- Abolished: 1967
- Total electors: 22,901

Doru Shahbad Assembly constituency was an assembly constituency in the India state of Jammu and Kashmir.

== Members of the Legislative Assembly ==
Election	Member	Party
1962	Syed Mir Qasim	Jammu & Kashmir National Conference

== Election results ==
=== Assembly Election 1962 ===
1962 Jammu and Kashmir Legislative Assembly election : Doru Shahbad
Party	Candidate	Votes	%	±%
JKNC	Syed Mir Qasim	Unopposed		
Registered electors		22,901		
JKNC win (new seat)				
