= Ali Mohammad Sagar =

Indian politician (born 1958)

Cabinet Minister, Government of Jammu and Kashmir
- Incumbent
- Assumed office 27 October 2026
- Lieutenant Governor: Manoj Sinha
- Chief Minister: Omar Abdullah
- Ministry and Departments: Revenue Department; Power Development Department; Department of Law, Justice and Parliamentary Affairs; Department of DMRRR, Election Department
- Preceded by: Omar Abdullah

General secretary Jammu & Kashmir National Conference
- Incumbent
- Assumed office June 2014

Personal details
- Party: Jammu & Kashmir National Conference
- Children: Yasmeen Sagar, Ishfaq Sagar, Salman Sagar

Ali Mohammad Sagar (born 1958) is an Indian politician from Jammu and Kashmir and a member of the Jammu and Kashmir National Conference. Sagar is currently serving as a minister Revenue Department, Power Development Department, Department of Law, Justice and Parliamentary Affairs, Department of DMRRR, Election Department in Govt. of Jammu and Kashmir.He serves as an MLA from Khanyar Assembly constituency. He previously served as the Minister of Rural Development in the Omar Abdullah-led cabinet and was appointed the General Secretary of the Jammu and Kashmir National Conference in 2014.

== Early life and education ==
Ali Mohammad Sagar is from Habakadal, Jammu and Kashmir. He is the son of Gh. Qadir. He completed his M.A. in 1978 and L.L.B. in 1983 at University of Kashmir. His son Salman Sagar contested the 2024 election.

== Career ==
Sagar won from Khanyar Assembly constituency representing the Jammu and Kashmir National Conference in the 2024 Jammu and Kashmir Legislative Assembly election and 2014 Jammu and Kashmir Legislative Assembly election. He polled 6,505 votes and defeated his nearest rival, Muhammad Khurshid Alam of the JKPDP, by a margin of 1,167 votes. He was first elected from Khanyar seat as an NC candidate in the 1996 Jammu and Kashmir Legislative Assembly election and retained it in the next two elections in 2002 and 2008.

== Electoral performance ==
Election	Constituency	Party	Result	Votes %	Opposition Candidate	Opposition Party	Opposition vote %	Ref
2024	Khanyar	JKNC	Won	62.46%	Sheikh Imran	Independent	20.93%	
2014	Khanyar	JKNC	Won	48.76%	Mohammed Khurshid Alam	JKPDP	40.01%	
2008	Khanyar	JKNC	Won	74.16%	Showkat Ahmad Hafiz	JKPDP	9.47%	
2002	Khanyar	JKNC	Won	93.85%	Mushtaq Ahmad	INC	4.16%	
1996	Khanyar	JKNC	Won	87.52%	Nazir Ahmed	JD	8.58%	
