= Chaman Lal Gupta =

Indian politician (1934–2021)

Chaman Lal Gupta (13 April 1934 – 18 May 2021) was an Indian politician from Jammu and Kashmir, belonging to Bharatiya Janata Party. He was union minister of state of defence from 2002 to 2004. Earlier, he held a portfolio of food processing and civil aviation.

He was born in 1934 in Jammu and did his MSC from G. M. Science College Jammu (Jammu and Kashmir) and Allahabad University, Allahabad (Uttar Pradesh). He was elected to Jammu and Kashmir State Assembly in 1972 as a member of Jana Sangh. He was elected to Lok Sabha in 1996, 1998, and 1999 from Udhampur (Lok Sabha constituency). He was a member of J&K Vidhan Sabha again from 2008 to 2014, as an MLA from Jammu West.

He had not been keeping well in his mid 80s. He died of COVID-19 on 18 May 2021, in Jammu, during the COVID-19 pandemic in India.

== Positions held ==
- 1972–77 Member, Jammu and Kashmir Legislative Assembly
- 1987–90 Member, Jammu and Kashmir Legislative Assembly & Member, Public Accounts Committee; Public Undertakings Committee;
- 1973–80 General-Secretary, Bharatiya Jana Sangh (B.J.S.), Jammu and Kashmir
- 1980–89 General-Secretary, Bharatiya Janata Party (B.J.P.), Jammu and Kashmir
- 1990–95 President, B.J.P., Jammu and Kashmir (two terms)
- 1996 Elected to 11th Lok Sabha, from Udhampur
- 1996–97 Member, Committee on Transport and Tourism
- 1998 Re-elected to 12th Lok Sabha (2nd term)
- 1998–99 Member, Joint Committee on the functioning of Wakf Board
- 1999 Re-elected to 13th Lok Sabha (3rd term)
- 1999–2001 Union Minister of State, Ministry of Civil Aviation
- 2001–2002 Union Minister of State (Independent Charge), Ministry of Food
- 1 July 2002 – 2004 Union Minister of State, Ministry of Defence
- 2008-2014 Member, Jammu and Kashmir Legislative Assembly Jammu West

== Electoral performance ==
Election	Constituency	Party	Result	Votes %	Opposition Candidate	Opposition Party	Opposition vote %	Ref
2008	Jammu West	BJP	Won	40.26%	Surinder Singh Shangari	Independent	24.95%	
1987	Jammu East	BJP	Won	49.52%	Ved Parkash	INC	38.02%	
1983	Jammu East	BJP	Lost	29.91%	Om Parkash	INC	55.98%	
1972	Jammu South	ABJS	Won	51.44%	Amrit Kumar Malhotra	INC	37.18%	

== Books published ==
- Sansad mein Jammu Kashmir;
- Sansad mein dedh varsh;
- Mere Prayaas
- Article 370: A Thorn
