= Harl Assembly constituency =

Constituency of the Jammu and Kashmir legislative assembly in India

Harl
- Former constituency No. 6 for the Jammu and Kashmir Legislative Assembly

Constituency details
- Country: India
- Region: North India
- State: Jammu and Kashmir
- Established: 1967
- Abolished: 1977
- Total electors: 35,426 (1972)
- Reservation: None

Harl (or Harli) was an assembly constituency in the India state of Jammu and Kashmir.

== Members of the Legislative Assembly ==
Election	Member	Party
1967	Abdul Gani Mir	Indian National Congress
1972	Abdul Gani Mir	Indian National Congress

== Election results ==
=== Assembly Election 1972 ===
1972 Jammu and Kashmir Legislative Assembly election : Harl
Party	Candidate	Votes	%	±%
INC	Abdul Gani Mir	12,474	57.51%	▼9.91
JI	Syed Alishah Jeelani	4,511	20.80%	New
Independent	Ghulam Qadir Masala	4,310	19.87%	New
Independent	Abdul Aziz Mir	397	1.83%	New
Margin of victory		7,963	36.71%	▲1.87
Turnout		21,692	65.27%	▲8.06
Registered electors		35,426		▲13.14
INC hold		Swing	▼9.91	

=== Assembly Election 1967 ===
1967 Jammu and Kashmir Legislative Assembly election : Harl
Party	Candidate	Votes	%	±%
INC	Abdul Gani Mir	11,226	67.42%	New
Independent	G. Rasool	5,425	32.58%	New
Margin of victory		5,801	34.84%	
Turnout		16,651	54.99%	
Registered electors		31,313		
INC win (new seat)				
