= Amira Kadal Assembly constituency =

Former constituency of the Jammu and Kashmir Legislative Assembly

Coordinates: 34.070°N 74.807°E

Amira Kadal
- Former constituency for the Jammu and Kashmir Legislative Assembly

Constituency details
- Country: India
- State: Jammu and Kashmir
- District: Srinagar
- Established: 1962
- Abolished: 2018

Amira Kadal was a legislative constituency in the Jammu and Kashmir Legislative Assembly of Jammu and Kashmir a north state of India. Amira Kadal was also part of Srinagar Lok Sabha constituency.

== Members of the Legislative Assembly ==
Election	Member	Party
1951	Maulana Masoodi	Jammu & Kashmir National Conference
1962	Sham Lal Saraf	Jammu & Kashmir National Conference
1967	Ghulam Mohammed Sadiq	Indian National Congress
1972	Zainab Begum	Indian National Congress
1977	Ghulam Mohiuddin Shah	Jammu & Kashmir National Conference
1983	Ghulam Mohiuddin Shah	Jammu & Kashmir National Conference
1987	Ghulam Mohiuddin Shah	Jammu & Kashmir National Conference
1996	Mohammad Shafi Bhat	Jammu & Kashmir National Conference
2002	Mohammad Shafi Bhat	Indian National Congress
2008	Nasir Aslam Wani	Jammu & Kashmir National Conference
2014	Syed Mohammad Altaf Bukhari	Jammu and Kashmir Peoples Democratic Party

== Election results ==
=== Assembly Election 2014 ===
2014 Jammu and Kashmir Legislative Assembly election: Amira Kadal
Party	Candidate	Votes	%	±%
JKPDP	Syed Mohammad Altaf Bukhari	11,726	54.57%	▲27.01
JKNC	Nasir Aslam Wani	6,385	29.71%	▼5.03
BJP	Heena Shafi Bhat	1,359	6.32%	▲5.00
Independent	Bikram Singh	478	2.22%	New
INC	Sheikh Aamir Rasool	318	1.48%	▼2.14
NOTA	None of the Above	208	0.97%	New
Independent	Younis Qawam	188	0.87%	New
Independent	Ghulam Hassan Dar	186	0.87%	New
Independent	Farooq Ahmad Khan	161	0.75%	New
Independent	Zeeshan Pandith	145	0.67%	New
Margin of victory		5,341	24.86%	▲17.67
Turnout		21,488	24.84%	▲9.88
Registered electors		86,520		▲14.94
JKPDP gain from JKNC		Swing	▲19.82	

=== Assembly Election 2008 ===
2008 Jammu and Kashmir Legislative Assembly election: Amira Kadal
Party	Candidate	Votes	%	±%
JKNC	Nasir Aslam Wani	3,912	34.75%	▲5.27
JKPDP	Parvaiz Ahmed Bhat	3,103	27.56%	New
Independent	Mohammed Altaf Dar	935	8.31%	New
Independent	Sabiya Qadiri	707	6.28%	New
INC	Ahmreen Badar	407	3.62%	▼47.39
JKANC	Mohammed Muzaffar Shah	370	3.29%	New
Independent	Imtiyaz Ahmed Bhat	322	2.86%	New
Independent	Mohammed Yousuf Sultan	176	1.56%	New
People's Democratic Front (Jammu and Kashmir)	Shuban Krishen Dudha	159	1.41%	New
NCP	Ashiq Rafiq Khan	155	1.38%	New
BJP	Parikshit Koul	149	1.32%	▼7.14
Margin of victory		809	7.19%	▼14.35
Turnout		11,258	14.96%	▲11.89
Registered electors		75,277		▲1.12
JKNC gain from INC		Swing	▼16.26	

=== Assembly Election 2002 ===
2002 Jammu and Kashmir Legislative Assembly election: Amira Kadal
Party	Candidate	Votes	%	±%
INC	Mohammad Shafi Bhat	1,163	51.01%	▲46.84
JKNC	Ghulam Nabi Mir	672	29.47%	▼34.38
BJP	Lalit Kumar Moza	193	8.46%	▲0.15
JKPDP	Najeeb Abbas	131	5.75%	New
JD(U)	Afroza Qadir	65	2.85%	New
Independent	Hilal Ahmad Sheikh	23	1.01%	New
Independent	Javeed Iqbal Shah	23	1.01%	New
Margin of victory		491	21.54%	▼27.80
Turnout		2,280	3.06%	▼8.74
Registered electors		74,442		▲31.84
INC gain from JKNC		Swing	▼12.85	

=== Assembly Election 1996 ===
1996 Jammu and Kashmir Legislative Assembly election: Amira Kadal
Party	Candidate	Votes	%	±%
JKNC	Mohammad Shafi Bhat	4,256	63.86%	▲8.51
JD	Mohammed Altaf Dar	968	14.52%	New
BJP	Lalit Kumar Moza	554	8.31%	▲7.72
JKNPP	Bhim Singh	406	6.09%	New
INC	Iftikhar Sadiq	278	4.17%	New
Independent	Javed Iqbal	127	1.91%	New
AIIC(T)	Hilal Ahmad Bhat	76	1.14%	New
Margin of victory		3,288	49.33%	▲37.20
Turnout		6,665	11.51%	▼56.34
Registered electors		56,462		▲8.84
JKNC hold		Swing	▲8.51	

=== Assembly Election 1987 ===
1987 Jammu and Kashmir Legislative Assembly election: Amira Kadal
Party	Candidate	Votes	%	±%
JKNC	Ghulam Mohi-Ud-Din Shah	19,567	55.35%	▼22.07
Independent	Mohammed Yusouf Shah	15,278	43.22%	New
BJP	Om Prakash	211	0.60%	New
Margin of victory		4,289	12.13%	▼46.84
Turnout		35,351	71.39%	▼3.32
Registered electors		51,875		▲12.41
JKNC hold		Swing		

=== Assembly Election 1983 ===
1983 Jammu and Kashmir Legislative Assembly election: Amira Kadal
Party	Candidate	Votes	%	±%
JKNC	Ghulam Mohi-Ud-Din Shah	25,533	77.42%	▲19.68
INC	Abdul Aziz	6,086	18.45%	New
JKNC	Mohammed Sadiq	719	2.18%	▼55.56
Independent	G. R. Mughal	286	0.87%	New
Margin of victory		19,447	58.97%	▲42.36
Turnout		32,978	73.64%	▼1.10
Registered electors		46,146		▲33.20
JKNC hold		Swing	▲19.68	

=== Assembly Election 1977 ===
1977 Jammu and Kashmir Legislative Assembly election: Amira Kadal
Party	Candidate	Votes	%	±%
JKNC	Ghulam Mohi-Ud-Din Shah	14,515	57.74%	New
JP	Ghulam Mohi-Ud-Din Wani	10,340	41.13%	New
Independent	Ghulam Mohammed Bhat	283	1.13%	New
Margin of victory		4,175	16.61%	▲16.24
Turnout		25,138	74.54%	▲15.43
Registered electors		34,644		▲1.34
JKNC gain from INC		Swing		

=== Assembly Election 1972 ===
1972 Jammu and Kashmir Legislative Assembly election: Amira Kadal
Party	Candidate	Votes	%	±%
INC	Zainab Begum	7,446	38.12%	▼35.45
JI	Mohammed Farooq	7,374	37.76%	New
Independent	Saif Ud Din	2,390	12.24%	New
Independent	Mohammad Ramzan	1,133	5.80%	New
Independent	Ghulam Mohammad Khan	783	4.01%	New
ABJS	Om Prakash	405	2.07%	New
Margin of victory		72	0.37%	▼46.77
Turnout		19,531	59.85%	▲5.74
Registered electors		34,187		▲23.32
INC hold		Swing	▼35.45	

=== Assembly Election 1967 ===
1967 Jammu and Kashmir Legislative Assembly election: Amira Kadal
Party	Candidate	Votes	%	±%
INC	Ghulam Mohammed Sadiq	10,480	73.57%	New
JKNC	G. A. Sofi	3,765	26.43%	▼59.04
Margin of victory		6,715	47.14%	▼23.80
Turnout		14,245	52.73%	▼12.47
Registered electors		27,722		▲46.72
INC gain from JKNC		Swing		

=== Assembly Election 1962 ===
1962 Jammu and Kashmir Legislative Assembly election: Amira Kadal
Party	Candidate	Votes	%	±%
JKNC	Sham Lal Saraf	10,313	85.47%	New
PSP	Om Prakash	1,753	14.53%	New
Margin of victory		8,560	70.94%	
Turnout		12,066	64.23%	
Registered electors		18,895		
JKNC win (new seat)				

== See also ==
- Amira Kadal
