= Khanyar Assembly constituency =

Constituency of the Jammu and Kashmir legislative assembly in India

Coordinates: 34.092°N 74.819°E

Khanyar
- Constituency No. 20 for the Jammu and Kashmir Legislative Assembly

Constituency details
- Country: India
- State: Jammu and Kashmir
- District: Srinagar
- Lok Sabha constituency: Srinagar
- Established: 1962
- Total electors: number of electors at last election. Add a ref

Member of Legislative Assembly
- Incumbent Ali Mohammad Sagar
- Party: Jammu and Kashmir National Conference
- Elected year: 2024

Khanyar Assembly constituency is one of the 90 constituencies in the Jammu and Kashmir Legislative Assembly of Jammu and Kashmir a north state of India. Khanyar is also part of Srinagar Lok Sabha constituency.

== Members of the Legislative Assembly ==
| Election | Member | Party |
|---|---|---|
| 1962 | Gazi Abdul Rehman | Jammu & Kashmir National Conference |
| 1967 | G. Ahmed | Indian National Congress |
| 1972 | Saif Ud Din Qari | Jamaat-e-Islami |
| 1996 | Ali Mohammad Sagar | Jammu & Kashmir National Conference |
| 2002 | Ali Mohammad Sagar | Jammu & Kashmir National Conference |
| 2008 | Ali Mohammad Sagar | Jammu & Kashmir National Conference |
| 2014 | Ali Mohammad Sagar | Jammu & Kashmir National Conference |
| 2024 | Ali Mohammad Sagar | Jammu and Kashmir National Conference |

== Election results ==
=== Assembly Election 2024 ===
2024 Jammu and Kashmir Legislative Assembly election : Khanyar
| Party | Candidate | Votes | % | ±% |
|---|---|---|---|---|
| JKNC | Ali Mohammad Sagar | 14,906 | 62.46% | New |
| Independent | Sheikh Imran | 4,994 | 20.93% | New |
| Independent | Waseem Ahmed Shalla | 1,951 | 8.18% | New |
| JKPDP | Tafazul Mushtaq | 651 | 2.73% | ▼37.28 |
| JKAP | Bilal Ahmad Mir | 312 | 1.31% | New |
| Independent | Parvez Jamal | 247 | 1.03% | New |
| NOTA | None of the Above | 411 | 1.72% | ▲0.96 |
| Margin of victory | | 9,912 | 41.53% | ▲32.79 |
| Turnout | | 23,865 | 26.16% | ▲0.01 |
| Registered electors | | 91,226 | | ▲78.84 |
| JKNC gain from JKNC | | Swing | ▲13.70 | |

=== Assembly Election 2014 ===
2014 Jammu and Kashmir Legislative Assembly election : Khanyar
| Party | Candidate | Votes | % | ±% |
|---|---|---|---|---|
| JKNC | Ali Mohammad Sagar | 6,505 | 48.76% | ▼25.40 |
| JKPDP | Mohammed Khurshid Alam | 5,338 | 40.01% | ▲30.54 |
| Independent | Firdous Ahmad Shiekh | 552 | 4.14% | New |
| BJP | Ashok Kumar Bhat | 550 | 4.12% | New |
| Independent | Bilal Ahmed Wani | 154 | 1.15% | New |
| INC | Mohammed Yaqub Vakil | 141 | 1.06% | ▼0.58 |
| NOTA | None of the Above | 102 | 0.76% | New |
| Margin of victory | | 1,167 | 8.75% | ▼55.95 |
| Turnout | | 13,342 | 26.16% | ▲8.74 |
| Registered electors | | 51,011 | | ▲4.32 |
| JKNC hold | | Swing | ▼25.40 | |

=== Assembly Election 2008 ===
2008 Jammu and Kashmir Legislative Assembly election : Khanyar
| Party | Candidate | Votes | % | ±% |
|---|---|---|---|---|
| JKNC | Ali Mohammad Sagar | 6,314 | 74.16% | ▼19.69 |
| JKPDP | Showkat Ahmad Hafiz | 806 | 9.47% | New |
| JKPDF | Firdous Ahmad Sheikh | 644 | 7.56% | New |
| Independent | Mohmad Latif Lone | 212 | 2.49% | New |
| JKANC | Mushtaq Ahmad Jan | 174 | 2.04% | New |
| INC | Mohammed Aslam Dar | 139 | 1.63% | ▼2.52 |
| JKNPP | Mohammad Maqbool Sheikh | 73 | 0.86% | New |
| Margin of victory | | 5,508 | 64.69% | ▼25.00 |
| Turnout | | 8,514 | 17.41% | ▲13.20 |
| Registered electors | | 48,900 | | ▼32.55 |
| JKNC hold | | Swing | ▼19.69 | |

=== Assembly Election 2002 ===
2002 Jammu and Kashmir Legislative Assembly election : Khanyar
| Party | Candidate | Votes | % | ±% |
|---|---|---|---|---|
| JKNC | Ali Mohammad Sagar | 2,868 | 93.85% | ▲6.33 |
| INC | Mushtaq Ahmad | 127 | 4.16% | New |
| BJP | Wali Mohammed Wani | 61 | 2.00% | New |
| Margin of victory | | 2,741 | 89.69% | ▲10.75 |
| Turnout | | 3,056 | 4.22% | ▼7.64 |
| Registered electors | | 72,495 | | ▲21.44 |
| JKNC hold | | Swing | | |

=== Assembly Election 1996 ===
1996 Jammu and Kashmir Legislative Assembly election : Khanyar
| Party | Candidate | Votes | % | ±% |
|---|---|---|---|---|
| JKNC | Ali Mohammad Sagar | 6,194 | 87.52% | New |
| JD | Nazir Ahmed | 607 | 8.58% | New |
| Independent | Abdul Rashid Kabli | 276 | 3.90% | New |
| Margin of victory | | 5,587 | 78.95% | ▲31.90 |
| Turnout | | 7,077 | 12.66% | ▼42.87 |
| Registered electors | | 59,696 | | ▲109.00 |
| JKNC gain from JI | | Swing | | |

=== Assembly Election 1972 ===
1972 Jammu and Kashmir Legislative Assembly election : Khanyar
| Party | Candidate | Votes | % | ±% |
|---|---|---|---|---|
| JI | Saif Ud Din Qari | 9,530 | 60.97% | New |
| Independent | Gazy Abdul Rahman | 2,176 | 13.92% | New |
| INC | Ghulam Ahmed Burza | 1,246 | 7.97% | ▼37.00 |
| Independent | Mohammed Shafi | 941 | 6.02% | New |
| Independent | Abdul Rashid | 869 | 5.56% | New |
| SWA | Abdul Wahid Raina | 377 | 2.41% | New |
| Independent | Mufti Mirai Ud Din | 197 | 1.26% | New |
| Margin of victory | | 7,354 | 47.05% | ▲46.01 |
| Turnout | | 15,631 | 62.02% | ▲29.60 |
| Registered electors | | 28,562 | | ▲21.52 |
| JI gain from INC | | Swing | ▲16.00 | |

=== Assembly Election 1967 ===
1967 Jammu and Kashmir Legislative Assembly election : Khanyar
| Party | Candidate | Votes | % | ±% |
|---|---|---|---|---|
| INC | G. Ahmed | 2,656 | 44.97% | New |
| JKNC | G. A. R. Bhat | 2,595 | 43.94% | ▼52.05 |
| Democratic National Conference | B. U. D. Zahid | 655 | 11.09% | ▲7.08 |
| Margin of victory | | 61 | 1.03% | ▼90.95 |
| Turnout | | 5,906 | 26.17% | ▼43.73 |
| Registered electors | | 23,503 | | ▲21.72 |
| INC gain from JKNC | | Swing | | |

=== Assembly Election 1962 ===
1962 Jammu and Kashmir Legislative Assembly election : Khanyar
| Party | Candidate | Votes | % | ±% |
|---|---|---|---|---|
| JKNC | Gazi Abdul Rehman | 12,762 | 95.99% | New |
| Democratic National Conference | Baha - Ud - Din | 533 | 4.01% | New |
| Margin of victory | | 12,229 | 91.98% | |
| Turnout | | 13,295 | 72.61% | |
| Registered electors | | 19,309 | | |
| JKNC win (new seat) | | | | |

== See also ==
- Khanyar
- Srinagar district
- List of constituencies of Jammu and Kashmir Legislative Assembly
