= Satish Kumar Sharma (politician) =

Indian politician

Member of Jammu and Kashmir Legislative Assembly
- Incumbent
- Assumed office 8 October 2024
- Preceded by: Nirmal Kumar Singh
- Constituency: Billawar

Personal details
- Party: Bharatiya Janata Party
- Profession: Politician

Satish Kumar Sharma is an Indian politician from Jammu and Kashmir. He is a Member of the Jammu and Kashmir Legislative Assembly from 2024, representing Billawar Assembly constituency as a member of the Bharatiya Janta Party.

== Electoral performance ==
Election	Constituency	Party	Result	Votes %	Opposition Candidate	Opposition Party	Opposition vote %	Ref
2024	Billawar	BJP	Won	64.38%	Manohar Lal Sharma	INC	33.56%	
2008	Billawar	BJP	Lost	22.31%	Manohar Lal Sharma	INC	35.78%	

== See also ==
- 2024 Jammu & Kashmir Legislative Assembly election
- Jammu and Kashmir Legislative Assembly
