= Bhalessa–Bunjwah Assembly constituency =

Constituency of the Jammu and Kashmir legislative assembly in India

Bhalessa–Bunjwah
- Former constituency for the Jammu and Kashmir Legislative Assembly

Constituency details
- Country: India
- Region: North India
- State: Jammu and Kashmir
- Established: 1962
- Abolished: 1967
- Total electors: 23,119

Bhalessa–Bunjwah Assembly constituency was an assembly constituency in the India state of Jammu and Kashmir.

== Members of the Legislative Assembly ==
Election	Member	Party
1962	Abdul Gani Goni	Jammu & Kashmir National Conference

== Election results ==
=== Assembly Election 1962 ===
1962 Jammu and Kashmir Legislative Assembly election : Bhalessa–Bunjwah
Party	Candidate	Votes	%	±%
JKNC	Abdul Gani Goni	13,717	89.10%	New
JPP	Rup Chand	1,678	10.90%	New
Margin of victory		12,039	78.20%	
Turnout		15,395	70.08%	
Registered electors		23,119		
JKNC win (new seat)				
