= Drugmulla Assembly constituency =

Constituency of the Jammu and Kashmir legislative assembly in India

Drugmulla
- Former constituency for the Jammu and Kashmir Legislative Assembly

Constituency details
- Country: India
- Region: North India
- State: Jammu and Kashmir
- Established: 1962
- Abolished: 1967
- Total electors: 22,512

Drugmulla Assembly constituency was an assembly constituency in the India state of Jammu and Kashmir.

== Members of the Legislative Assembly ==
| Election | Member | Party |
|---|---|---|
| 1962 | Mohammad Sultan Tantray | Jammu & Kashmir National Conference |

== Election results ==
=== Assembly Election 1962 ===
1962 Jammu and Kashmir Legislative Assembly election : Drugmulla
| Party | Candidate | Votes | % | ±% |
|---|---|---|---|---|
| JKNC | Mohammad Sultan Tantray | Unopposed | | |
| Registered electors | | 22,512 | | |
| JKNC win (new seat) | | | | |
