= Nandi Assembly constituency =

Constituency of the Jammu and Kashmir legislative assembly in India

Nandi
- Former constituency for the Jammu and Kashmir Legislative Assembly

Constituency details
- Country: India
- Region: North India
- State: Jammu and Kashmir
- Established: 1962
- Abolished: 1972
- Total electors: 30,441

Nandi Assembly constituency was an assembly constituency in the India state of Jammu and Kashmir.

== Members of the Legislative Assembly ==
Election	Member	Party
1962	Abdul Kabir Wani	Jammu & Kashmir National Conference
1967	A. Rehman	Indian National Congress
1972	Ali Mohammed Dar	Jamaat-e-Islami

== Election results ==
=== Assembly Election 1972 ===
1972 Jammu and Kashmir Legislative Assembly election : Nandi
Party	Candidate	Votes	%	±%
JI	Ali Mohammed Dar	7,201	39.28%	New
INC	Ghulam Hassan Rather	4,773	26.04%	New
Independent	Abdul Salam Jeelani	3,513	19.16%	New
Independent	Ghulam Mohmmad Bhat	1,844	10.06%	New
Independent	Abdul Salam Rather	1,001	5.46%	New
Margin of victory		2,428	13.24%	
Turnout		18,332	65.44%	▲60.22
Registered electors		30,441		▲15.14
JI gain from INC		Swing		

=== Assembly Election 1967 ===
1967 Jammu and Kashmir Legislative Assembly election : Nandi
Party	Candidate	Votes	%	±%
INC	A. Rehman	Unopposed		
Registered electors		26,438		▲13.59
INC gain from JKNC		Swing		

=== Assembly Election 1962 ===
1962 Jammu and Kashmir Legislative Assembly election : Nandi
Party	Candidate	Votes	%	±%
JKNC	Abdul Kabir Wani	Unopposed		
Registered electors		23,274		
JKNC win (new seat)				
