= Naubug Assembly constituency =

Constituency of the Jammu and Kashmir legislative assembly in India

Naubug
- Former constituency for the Jammu and Kashmir Legislative Assembly

Constituency details
- Country: India
- Region: North India
- State: Jammu and Kashmir
- Established: 1962
- Abolished: 1977
- Total electors: 26,731

Naubug Assembly constituency was an assembly constituency in the India state of Jammu and Kashmir.

== Members of the Legislative Assembly ==
| Election | Member | Party |
Naubug Brang Vally
| 1962 | Nizam-Ud-Din | Jammu & Kashmir National Conference |
Naubug
| 1967 | Hassan-Ud-Din | Indian National Congress |
| 1972 | Pir Husan Qasim | Indian National Congress |

== Election results ==
=== Assembly Election 1972 ===
1972 Jammu and Kashmir Legislative Assembly election : Naubug
| Party | Candidate | Votes | % | ±% |
|---|---|---|---|---|
| INC | Pir Husan Qasim | Unopposed | | |
| Registered electors | | 26,731 | | ▲8.18 |
| INC hold | | Swing | | |

=== Assembly Election 1967 ===
1967 Jammu and Kashmir Legislative Assembly election : Naubug
| Party | Candidate | Votes | % | ±% |
|---|---|---|---|---|
| INC | Hassan-Ud-Din | Unopposed | | |
| Registered electors | | 24,710 | | ▲14.24 |
| INC gain from JKNC | | Swing | | |

=== Assembly Election 1962 ===
1962 Jammu and Kashmir Legislative Assembly election : Naubug Brang Vally
| Party | Candidate | Votes | % | ±% |
|---|---|---|---|---|
| JKNC | Nizam-Ud-Din | Unopposed | | |
| Registered electors | | 21,629 | | |
| JKNC win (new seat) | | | | |
