= Darhgam Assembly constituency =

Constituency of the Jammu and Kashmir legislative assembly in India

Darhgam
- Former constituency for the Jammu and Kashmir Legislative Assembly

Constituency details
- Country: India
- Region: North India
- State: Jammu and Kashmir
- Established: 1962
- Abolished: 1967
- Total electors: 22,843

Darhgam Assembly constituency was an assembly constituency in the India state of Jammu and Kashmir.

== Members of the Legislative Assembly ==
Election	Member	Party
1962	Ghulam Nabi Wani	Independent politician

== Election results ==
=== Assembly Election 1962 ===
1962 Jammu and Kashmir Legislative Assembly election : Darhgam
Party	Candidate	Votes	%	±%
Independent	Ghulam Nabi Wani	7,573	53.71%	New
JKNC	Ghulam Mohammed Mir	6,527	46.29%	New
Margin of victory		1,046	7.42%	
Turnout		14,100	62.30%	
Registered electors		22,843		
Independent win (new seat)				
