= Tankipora Assembly constituency =

Constituency of the Jammu and Kashmir legislative assembly in India

Tankipora
- Former constituency for the Jammu and Kashmir Legislative Assembly

Constituency details
- Country: India
- Region: North India
- State: Jammu and Kashmir
- Established: 1962
- Abolished: 1972
- Total electors: 26,979

Tankipora Assembly constituency was an assembly constituency in the India state of Jammu and Kashmir.

== Members of the Legislative Assembly ==
Election	Member	Party
1962	G. M. Sadiq	Jammu & Kashmir National Conference
1967	Noor Mohammad	Indian National Congress
1972	Ghulam Nabi Nowshehri	Jamaat-e-Islami

== Election results ==
=== Assembly Election 1972 ===
1972 Jammu and Kashmir Legislative Assembly election : Tankipora
Party	Candidate	Votes	%	±%
JI	Ghulam Nabi Nowshehri	5,121	33.77%	New
Independent	Mohan Kishen Tikoo	3,942	25.99%	New
INC	Noor Mohammad	3,153	20.79%	▼46.72
Independent	Ghulam Qadir Basmati	1,759	11.60%	New
Independent	Jalal-Ud-Din	411	2.71%	New
ABJS	Kailash Nath Kaul	386	2.55%	New
Independent	Ali Mohammed	301	1.98%	New
Margin of victory		1,179	7.77%	▼27.24
Turnout		15,166	59.15%	▲17.71
Registered electors		26,979		▲31.32
JI gain from INC		Swing	▼33.74	

=== Assembly Election 1967 ===
1967 Jammu and Kashmir Legislative Assembly election : Tankipora
Party	Candidate	Votes	%	±%
INC	Noor Mohammad	5,340	67.51%	New
JKNC	A. R. Keng	2,570	32.49%	New
Margin of victory		2,770	35.02%	
Turnout		7,910	39.53%	▲38.50
Registered electors		20,544		▼18.38
INC gain from JKNC		Swing		

=== Assembly Election 1962 ===
1962 Jammu and Kashmir Legislative Assembly election : Tankipora
Party	Candidate	Votes	%	±%
JKNC	G. M. Sadiq	Unopposed		
Registered electors		25,169		
JKNC win (new seat)				
