= Kothar Assembly constituency =

Constituency of the Jammu and Kashmir legislative assembly in India

Kothar
- Former constituency for the Jammu and Kashmir Legislative Assembly

Constituency details
- Country: India
- Region: North India
- State: Jammu and Kashmir
- Established: 1962
- Abolished: 1972
- Total electors: 27,324

Kothar Assembly constituency was an assembly constituency in the India state of Jammu and Kashmir.

== Members of the Legislative Assembly ==
Election	Member	Party
1962	Manohar Nath Kaul	Jammu & Kashmir National Conference
1967	Mohammed Ashraf Khan	Indian National Congress
1972	Mohammed Ashraf Khan	Indian National Congress

== Election results ==
=== Assembly Election 1972 ===
1972 Jammu and Kashmir Legislative Assembly election : Kothar
Party	Candidate	Votes	%	±%
INC	Mohammed Ashraf Khan	14,901	70.60%	New
Independent	Mohammed Maqubool Dar	6,205	29.40%	New
Margin of victory		8,696	41.20%	
Turnout		21,106	80.51%	▲77.24
Registered electors		27,324		▲9.18
INC hold		Swing		

=== Assembly Election 1967 ===
1967 Jammu and Kashmir Legislative Assembly election : Kothar
Party	Candidate	Votes	%	±%
INC	Mohammed Ashraf Khan	Unopposed		
Registered electors		25,026		▲7.74
INC gain from JKNC		Swing		

=== Assembly Election 1962 ===
1962 Jammu and Kashmir Legislative Assembly election : Kothar
Party	Candidate	Votes	%	±%
JKNC	Manohar Nath Kaul	Unopposed		
Registered electors		23,229		
JKNC win (new seat)				
