= Balraj Puri =

Indian political commentator (1928–2014)

- Born: 5 August 1928; Jammu, British India
- Died: 30 August 2014 (aged 86); Jammu, India
- Occupations: Journalist, Writer
- Known for: Human Rights
- Spouse: Subhash Gupta
- Relatives: Ellora Puri (daughter), Luv Puri (son)

Balraj Puri (1928-2014) was an Indian Political commentator and human rights activist.

== Career ==
A committed peace activist Balraj Puri began his career in journalism in 1942 and since then has worked in or edited several publications.

In his 68 years of public career, he has played a crucial role in Indian politics. He mediated the famous 1975 Sheikh Abdullah-Indira Gandhi accord. He worked for communal harmony across India particularly in Uttar Pradesh and Delhi. From India's first Prime Minister Jawahar Lal Nehru to the present Prime Minister Manmohan Singh, Puri was constantly consulted on various aspects of the Kashmir issue. He also played an important role in restoring peace in Punjab in the 1980s.

== Awards and recognition ==
Puri was conferred the Padma Bhushan in 2005, one of India's highest civilian honors, in Literature and Education. On 31 October 2009 he was honoured with Indira Gandhi Award for National Integration at Delhi by the then Prime Minister Manmohan Singh. Singh described Puri's book Kashmir towards Insurgency as a primer for anybody trying to understand the intricacies of Kashmir issue. Singh also remarked Balraj Puri's life has been one of selfless service to the society and to our country. It has been a life dedicated to the cause of promoting peace, good-will and communal harmony. It has been a life spent in building bridges between regions and communities.

== Bibliography ==
- J.P. on Jammu and Kashmir (2005)
- 5000 Years of Kashmir (1997)
- Kashmir Towards Insurgency (1993)
- Jammu & Kashmir: Triumph and Tragedy of Indian Federalism (1981)
- Jammu – A Clue to Kashmir Tangle (1966)
