= Bakshi Abdur Rashid =

Indian politician

- Born: 1 January 1923; Srinagar, Jammu & Kashmir
- Died: August 1977
- Citizenship: India
- Education: Church Mission Educational Institution, Srinagar
- Occupation: Politician
- Years active: Since 1950
- Political party: National Conference
- Parent: Ghulam Qadir Khan (father) Begum Mehtab (mother)

Bakshi Abdur Rashid (1 January 1923 – August 1977) was an Indian politician who was a member of the 2nd Lok Sabha & 3rd Lok Sabha of India. He represented the Srinagar constituency of Jammu & Kashmir and was a member and General Secretary of the National Conference political party.

In the 3rd Lok Sabha, he was a Lok Sabha candidate, nominated by the President of India.

== Education and background ==
Rashid was educated at Church Mission Educational Institution, Srinagar.

== Posts held ==
#	From	To	Position
01	1951	1956	Member, State Constituent Assembly
02	1957	1962	Member, Second Lok Sabha
03	1962	1967	Member, Third Lok Sabha

== See also ==
- List of members of the 15th Lok Sabha of India
