= Ram Piara Saraf =

Kashmiri politician

R. P. Saraf, full name Ram Piara Saraf, (1924 – 24 June 2009) was a Kashmiri politician.

In 1952, Saraf was elected to the Constituent Assembly of Jammu and Kashmir from the Kadal constituency. He was a member of the Jammu and Kashmir Legislative Assembly for ten years. In 1958, he co founded the Democratic National Conference.

Saraf was a leader in the early years of Communist Party of India (Marxist-Leninist). In Kashmir the entire Communist Party of India (Marxist) (CPI(M)) organization had gone with Communist Party of India (Marxist-Leninist) (CPI(ML)). At the CPI(ML) party congress in 1970 Saraf was elected to the Central Committee. The formerly CPI(M) local organ Jammu Sandesh became the regional CPI(ML) publication.

In 1986, Saraf founded his own splinter group, the Internationalist Democratic Party. Two former Members of the Legislative Assembly of Jammu and Kashmir, Kristhan Dev Sethi and Abdul Kabir Wani, joined Saraf's group.

At the end of December 2002 the Nature-Human Centric Peoples Movement (NHCPM) was formed under his guidance.
