= Mohammad Sultan Tantray =

Indian politician

Mohammad Sultan Tantray (21 January 1927 – 25 April 2005) was born in Bohipora of Kupwara district in Kashmir.

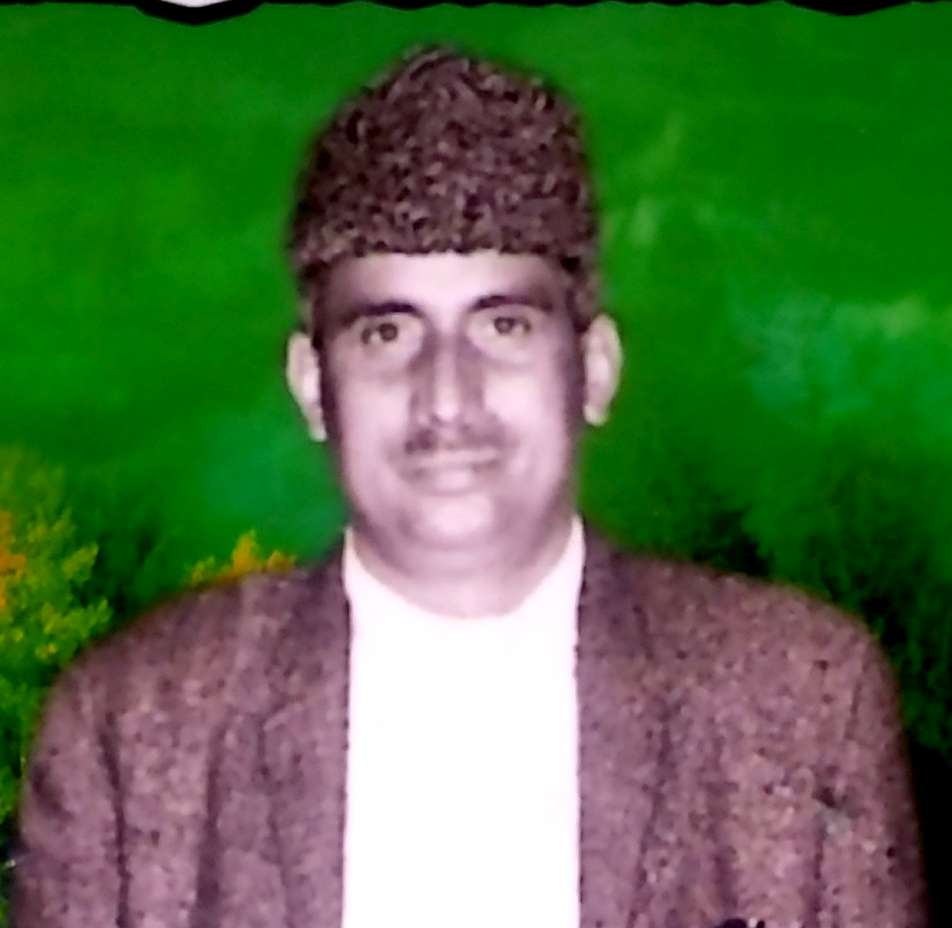
Mohammad sultan tantray Ex MlA kupwara

He represented Kupwara constituency in the Jammu and Kashmir Legislative Assembly from 1957 to 1972.
