= Ghulam Mohammad Mir (politician) =

Indian politician

MP, Lok Sabha for Jammu and Kashmir
- In office 1996–1998
- Succeeded by: Omar Abdullah
- Constituency: Srinagar

Personal details
- Political party: Indian National Congress

Ghulam Mohammad Mir was an Indian politician who served as a member of Lok Sabha, the lower-house of Indian Parliament. He represented the Srinagar constituency in the 11th Lok Sabha for 1996-1998 term. He was affiliated with the Indian National Congress. He has been described as "a Shia-leader from Budgam".

Lok Sabha
Preceded by Vacant (Elections not held)	Member of Parliament for Srinagar; 1996–1998	Succeeded by Omar Abdullah
