= Girdhari Lal Dogra =

Indian politician

Personal details
- Born: 17 July 1915
- Died: 27 November 1987 (aged 72)
- Party: Jammu & Kashmir National Conference; Indian National Congress

Girdhari Lal (17 July 1915 – 27 November 1987) was an Indian politician from Jammu and Kashmir, belonging to the National Conference and later the Indian National Congress. He was a member of the Jammu and Kashmir Legislative Assembly, and served as Finance minister of the state for 26 years. He was also a member of the Lok Sabha (the lower house of the Indian Parliament), elected from the Jammu–Poonch constituency and the Udhampur constituency. He was known as "The People’s man".

== Early life ==
Dogra was born in Bhaiya(pronounced as paiya) Village, Kathua District in Jammu and Kashmir. He started his education from Govt. Primary School Gurah Mundian, in a village near Bhaiya. After completing 5th from the primary school he got admission in Govt. Middle School Hiranagar where he studied up to class 8th. Thereafter, he joined Govt. High School Samba where he completed matriculation. He did his graduation from Hindu College Amritsar and later at Law College, Lahore. He joined Indian National Congress and was elected as General Secretary of the Student’s Union of Hindu College, Amritsar.

== Career ==
He came to Jammu after completing law and joined as a junior advocate to Lala Dina Nath Mahajan, a renowned Lawyer. He also became an editor of a weekly newspaper "Kidasn" which was published from Jammu. In 1942 he joined National Conference and started taking active part in J&K politics. He along with Moti Ram Baigra of Udhampur started the movement against Begari system being perpetuated by the Raja of Chenani which forced him to abolish it. This was his first pro-poor political activity as a social service.

In 1952, he was nominated to J&K Constituent Assembly from Hiranagar Constituency. He was elected from Hiranagar as MLA in 1957, 1962, 1967, 1972 and 1975. and Udhampur respectively. He was known to be a staunch Nehruvian. Dogra never lost an election and presented 26 budgets as the then finance minister. He also won the parliamentary elections twice, first from Jammu-Poonch Constituency in 1980 for 7th Lok Sabha, and later from Udhampur-Kathua Constituency in 1984. He was also offered the post of Lok Sabha speaker by Indira Gandhi but he did not take up the offer. Dogra was a freedom fighter who later became a prominent political figure in the state. He was associated with the National Conference until it merged with the All India Congress Committee in 1964.

== Profession ==
He was an advocate by profession.

== Personal details ==
He was married to Shakuntla Devi and is survived by two daughters, Sangeeta Jaitely and Nidhi S. Sharma. Dogra was the father-in-law of Arun Jaitley via his daughter Sangeeta Jaitley.

== See also ==
- Prem Nath Dogra
- Arun Jaitley
