= Democratic National Conference =

Political group in Jammu and Kashmir

Democratic National Conference is a splinter group of the Jammu & Kashmir National Conference. It was formed by Ghulam Muhammad Sadiq in 1957.

DNC later joined the Communist Party of India, then Communist Party of India (Marxist) and then Communist Party of India (Marxist-Leninist). The group was led by Ram Piara Saraf.
