= Jammu Praja Parishad =

Former political party in Indian-administered Kashmir

- Leader: Balraj Madhok
- Founded: November 1947
- Dissolved: 1963
- Merged into: Bharatiya Jana Sangh
- Ideology: Hindutva; Indian nationalism; Anti-communism
- National affiliation: Bharatiya Jana Sangh

The Jammu Praja Parishad (officially: All Jammu and Kashmir Praja Parishad) was a political party active in the Jammu Division of the Indian-administered Jammu and Kashmir. It was founded in November 1947 by the Rashtriya Swayamsevak Sangh activist Balraj Madhok, and served as the main opposition party in the state. It maintained close ties with Bharatiya Jana Sangh throughout its existence, and finally merged into the latter in 1963. Its main activity was to campaign for the close integration of Jammu and Kashmir with India and oppose the special status granted to the state under the Article 370 of the Indian constitution. After its merger with the Bharatiya Jana Sangh, the precursor of the present day Bharatiya Janata Party, the party gradually rose in stature. As an integral part of the Bharatiya Janata Party, it was a partner in the ruling coalition led by the People's Democratic Party.

== Inception ==
The Dogra Hindus of Jammu were originally organised under the banner of All Jammu and Kashmir Rajya Hindu Sabha, with Prem Nath Dogra as a leading member. The Rashtriya Swayamsevak Sangh (RSS) was established in Jammu in 1939 with the efforts of Kishen Dev Joshi. Jagdish Abrol and later Balraj Madhok, who arrived in 1942, are credited with its expansion. Madhok moved to the Kashmir Valley in 1944 and established RSS there. Prem Nath Dogra was also the chairman (sanghchalak) of the RSS in Jammu.

In May 1947, following the partition plan, the Hindu Sabha threw its support behind Maharaja Hari Singh's decision over the state's status, which in effect meant support for the state's independence. However, following the upheaval of the partition and the Indo-Pakistani War of 1947, its position changed to support for the accession of the state to India and, subsequently, full integration of Jammu with India.

The Praja Parishad was founded in November 1947 with this background, soon after the Pakistani tribal invasion. Balraj Madhok was a key organiser of the party, and Hari Wazir became its first president. Prem Nath Dogra and others soon joined. According to Madhok, the objective of the party was to achieve the "full integration" of Jammu and Kashmir with India and to oppose the "communist-dominated anti-Dogra government of Sheikh Abdullah."

== Jammu agitation (1949–1953) ==
In early 1949, the Praja Parishad started protesting against the policies of the National Conference government led by Sheikh Abdullah. The government swiftly arrested as many as 294 members of the Praja Parishad, including its president Prem Nath Dogra. Balraj Madhok was externed from the state. The Praja Parishad's call for full integration was in direct conflict with the demands of National Conference for complete autonomy of the state. The Indian leaders intervened and arranged a temporary truce. However, tensions came to a head again in the elections for the Jammu and Kashmir Constituent Assembly in 1951.

The Praja Parishad initially contested 28 out of 30 seats allocated to Jammu in the 1951 elections. However, the nomination papers of 13 of its candidates were rejected over technicalities. Fearing that the elections were being railroaded by the ruling National Conference, the Praja Parishad announced a boycott of the elections shortly before the polling. Consequently, all National Conference candidates were declared as winners from the Jammu province. Without democratic representation, the Praja Parishad took to the streets organising protests.

Calling for "full integration" of the state with the rest of India, the Parishad issued a rallying cry of "Ek Vidhan, Ek Nishan, Ek Pradhan" ("one constitution, one flag and one premier"), in opposition to the state's attempts to formulate its own constitution, adopt its own flag, and designate its head of executive as "Prime Minister." On 15 January 1952, students staged a demonstration against the hoisting of the state flag alongside the Indian Union flag. After they were punished, a large march took place on 8 February. The military was called out and a 72-hour curfew was imposed. N. Gopalaswami Ayyangar, the Indian Cabinet minister in charge of Kashmir affairs, arrived to broker peace, which was resented by Sheikh Abdullah.

By this time, the Bharatiya Jana Sangh had been formed in Delhi to promote Hindu nationalism, and the Praja Parishad became its affiliate in Jammu and Kashmir. Although Jana Sangh won only 3 seats in the Indian Parliament in the 1951–52 general elections, Shyama Prasad Mukherjee was a powerful leader, commanding a big block of support from various opposition parties. The Party and Mukherjee took up the cause of Jammu with vigour. The Praja Parishad submitted a memorandum to the President of India in June 1952 calling for full integration, and staged a large demonstration outside the Indian Parliament. The Hindu Mahasabha Member of Parliament N. C. Chatterjee ridiculed the autonomy of Jammu and Kashmir as a "Republic within a Republic."

In order to break the constitutional deadlock, the National Conference was invited to send a delegation to Delhi. The 1952 Delhi Agreement was intended to settle the extent of applicability of the Indian Constitution to the state. Following this, the Constituent Assembly abolished the monarchy in Kashmir, and adopted an elected Head of State (Sadr-i Riyasat), but was slow to implement the remaining measures agreed in the Delhi Agreement.

The Praja Parishad engaged in a civil disobedience campaign for a third time in November 1952, which again led to repression by the state government. The Parishad accused Abdullah of communalism (sectarianism), favouring Muslim interests in the state and sacrificing the interests of the others. The Jana Sangh joined hands with the Hindu Mahasabha and Ram Rajya Parishad to launch a parallel agitation in Delhi. In May 1953, Shyama Prasad Mukherjee attempted to enter Jammu and Kashmir, citing his rights as an Indian citizen to visit any part of the country. Abdullah prohibited his entry, and arrested him when he attempted. An estimated 10,000 activists were imprisoned in Jammu, Punjab and Delhi, including Members of Parliament. Mukherjee died in detention on 23 June 1953, leading to an uproar in India and precipitating an escalating crisis. Sheikh Abdullah lost his majority within his five-member cabinet, and was subsequently dismissed from the post of Prime Minister and imprisoned on the orders of Sadr-i Riyasat Karan Singh.

Bakshi Ghulam Mohammad, who succeeded Abdullah as the Prime Minister, implemented all the measures of the Delhi Agreement, making further concessions of powers to the Union government. The Praja Parishad agitation largely subsided after these events.

== Subsequent elections ==
The Praja Parishad failed to develop into a mass movement, especially in rural areas. The National Conference, having implemented land reforms benefiting the rural populations, was favoured by the electorate. The Parishad was also an overwhelmingly Hindu party, and had no appeal to Muslims. It also neglected the influential minority of Kashmiri Pandits and Ladakhi Buddhists.

In the Legislative Assembly elections in 1957, the Praja Parishad put forward 17 candidates and won 6 seats, one of whome later switched sides, leaving the Parishad with only 5 members in the Assembly.

In the elections held in 1962, the Praja Parishad was reduced to 3 seats. It held a large demonstration in the city of Jammu, protesting against alleged electoral malpractice. The Prime Minister Bakshi Ghulam Mohammad dismissed the complaints as "frivolous".

In 1963, the Praja Parishad merged into the Bharatiya Jana Sangh. In January 1965, the National Conference also merged into the Indian National Congress. The event has been characterised by analysts as a major "centralising strategy" and a victory for the Hindu nationalist agenda of the Praja Parishad and its allies.

In the 1972 elections, the party again won 3 seats.

In 1975, Sheikh Abdullah was released from prison and allowed to return to power after striking a deal with the central government. He subsequently revived the National Conference. Between 1975 and 1977, Prime Minister Indira Gandhi imposed a national emergency. After it was lifted, Jana Sangh merged with other opposition parties in India to form the Janata Party.

In the 1977 Legislative Assembly elections, widely regarded as the first free and fair elections in Jammu and Kashmir, the Janata Party won 11 seats in Jammu and a further 2 seats in the Kashmir Valley. The Indian National Congress also won 11 seats in Jammu, but none in the Kashmir Valley.

After the split of the Janata Party and the formation of the Bharatiya Janata Party from the former Jana Sangh faction, the party's fortunes in Jammu and Kashmir declined again until 2008, when it won 11 seats. The party scored a major victory in the elections in 2014, emerging as the second largest party in the assembly with 25 seats, and joining a coalition government with Mufti Mohammad Sayeed of the People's Democratic Party as the Chief Minister.

== Bibliography ==
- Chandra, Bipan; Mukherjee, Aditya; Mukherjee, Mridula (2008) [first published 1999], India since Independence, Penguin Books India, ISBN 978-0-14-310409-4
- Baxter, Craig (2015), "The Jana Sangh", in Donald Eugene Smith (ed.), South Asian Politics and Religion, Princeton University Press, ISBN 978-1-4008-7908-3
- Behera, Navnita Chadha (2007), Demystifying Kashmir, Pearson Education India, ISBN 978-8131708460
- Bose, Sumantra (2003), Kashmir: Roots of Conflict, Paths to Peace, Harvard University Press, ISBN 0-674-01173-2
- Chowdhary, Rekha (2015), Jammu and Kashmir: Politics of Identity and Separatism, Routledge, ISBN 978-1-317-41405-6
- Das Gupta, Jyoti Bhusan (2012), Jammu and Kashmir, Springer, ISBN 978-94-011-9231-6
- Jaffrelot, Christophe (1996), The Hindu Nationalist Movement and Indian Politics, C. Hurst & Co. Publishers, ISBN 978-1850653011
- Jaffrelot, Christophe (2007), Hindu Nationalism - A Reader, Princeton University Press, ISBN 978-0-691-13097-2
- Jaffrelot, Christophe (2011), Religion, Caste, and Politics in India, C Hurst & Co, ISBN 978-1849041386
- Puri, Balraj (November 2010), "The Question of Accession", Epilogue, 4 (11): 4–6
- Sahagala, Narendra (2011), Jammu & Kashmir: A State in Turbulence, Suruchi Prakashan, ISBN 978-81-89622-83-1
