= Khurshied Ahmed =

Indian politician

Member of Jammu and Kashmir Legislative Assembly
- Incumbent
- Assumed office 8 October 2024
- Preceded by: Mumtaz Ahmad
- Constituency: Gulabgarh Assembly constituency

Personal details
- Political party: Jammu & Kashmir National Conference
- Profession: Politician

Khurshied Ahmed is an Indian politician from Jammu & Kashmir. He is a Member of the Jammu & Kashmir Legislative Assembly from 2024, representing Gulabgarh Assembly constituency as a Member of the Jammu & Kashmir National Conference party.

== Electoral performance ==
Election	Constituency	Party	Result	Votes %	Opposition Candidate	Opposition Party	Opposition vote %	Ref
2024	Gulabgarh	JKNC	Won	42.82%	Ajaz Ahmed Khan	Independent	33.69%	

== See also ==
- 2024 Jammu & Kashmir Legislative Assembly election
- Jammu and Kashmir Legislative Assembly
