= 2008 Jammu and Kashmir Legislative Assembly election =

State assembly election in India

- 17 November 2008 to 24 December 2008

All 87 seats in Jammu and Kashmir Legislative Assembly 44 seats needed for a majority
- Registered: 6,461,757
- Turnout: 61.16% (▲17.46%)
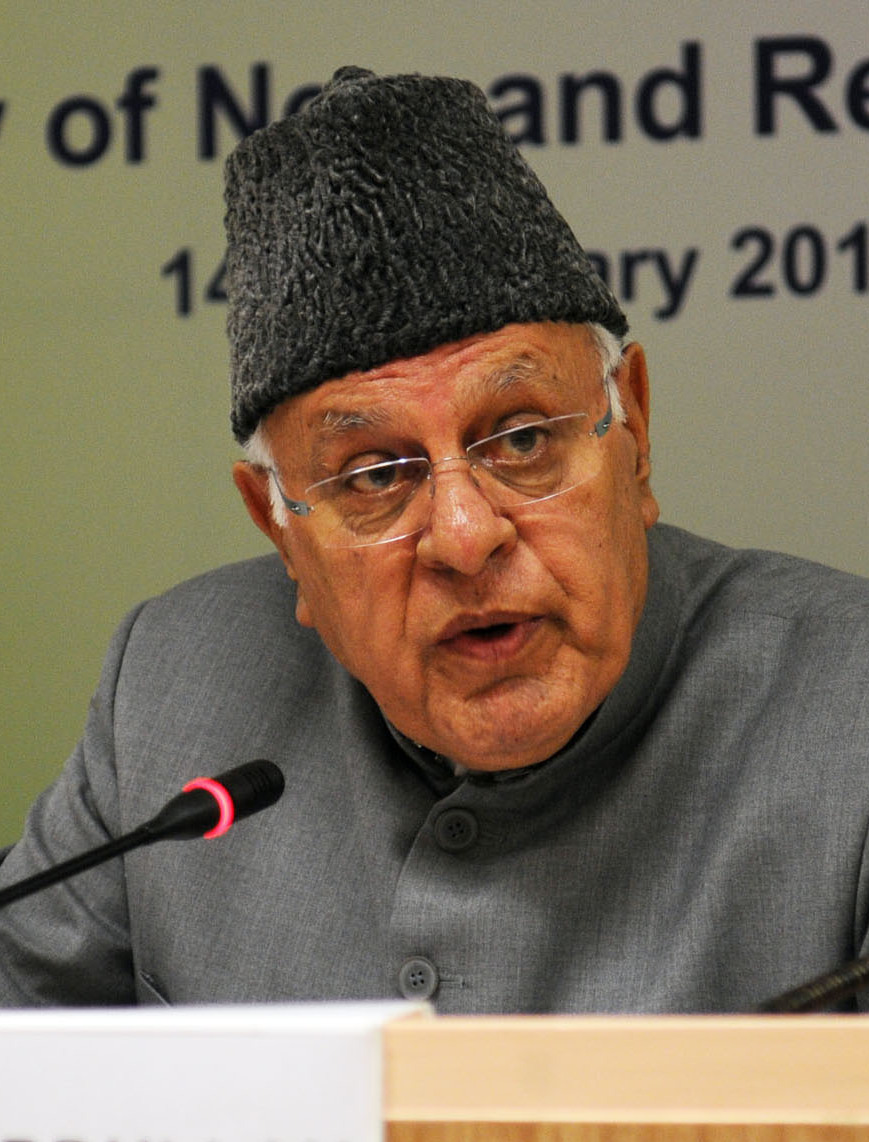

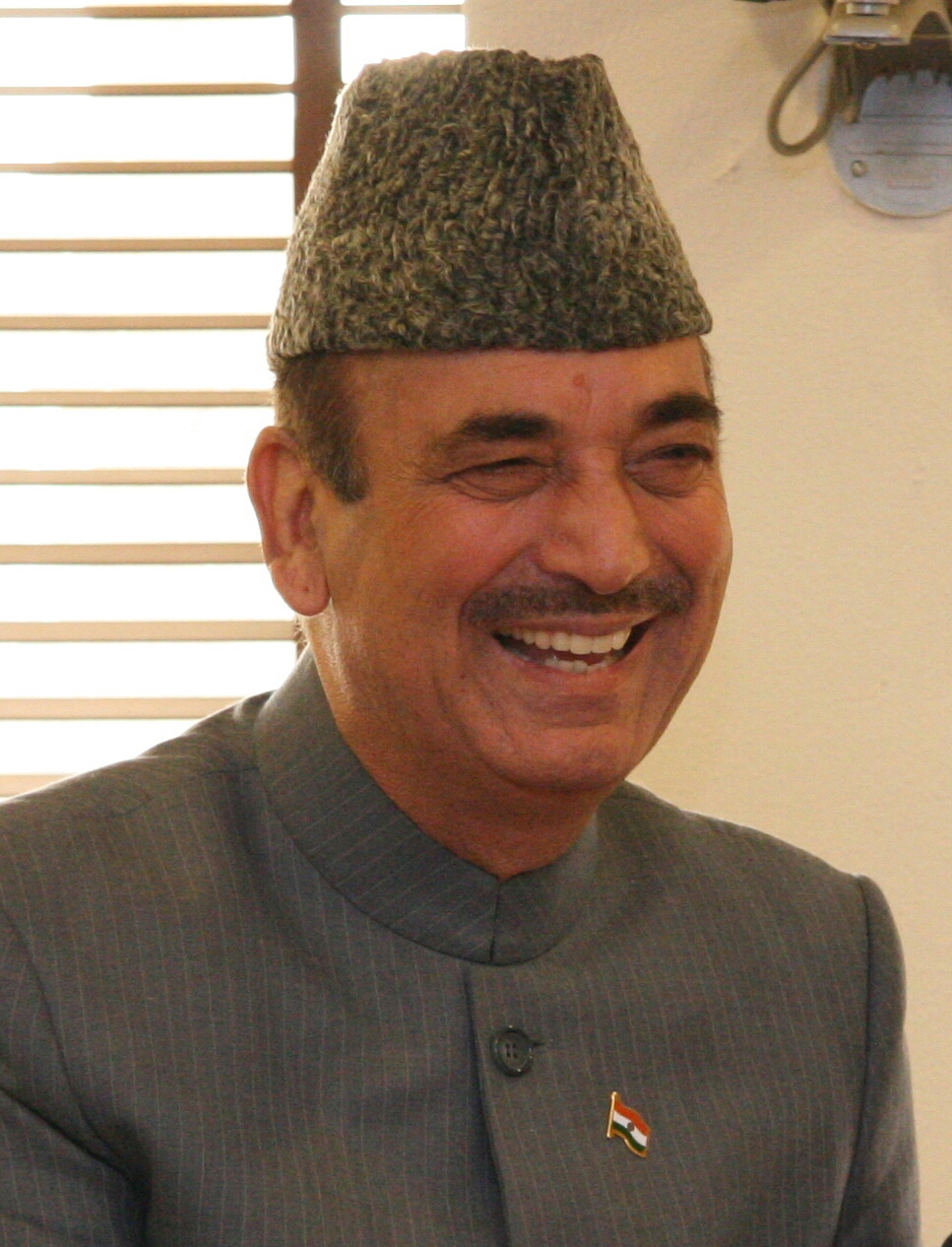

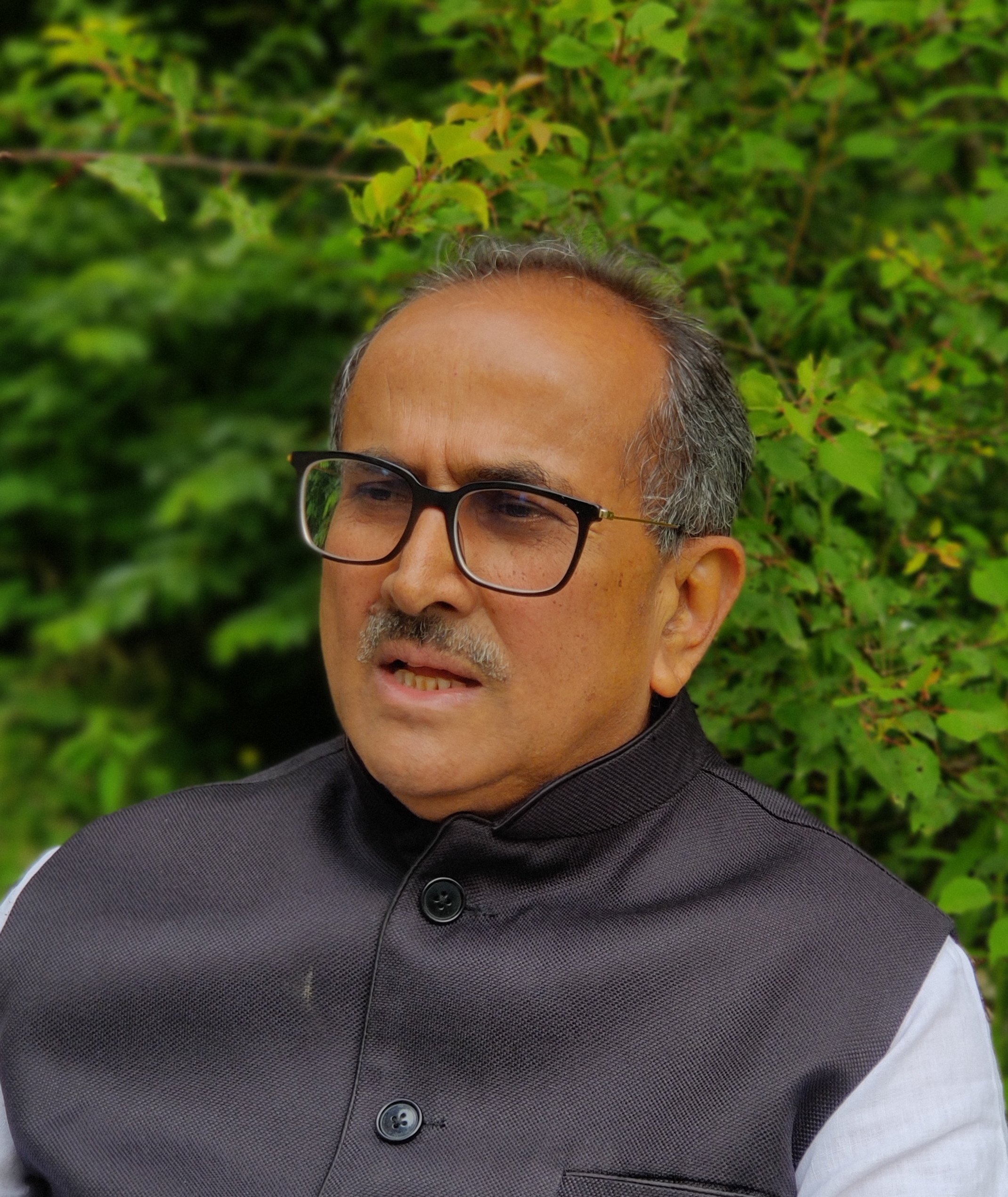

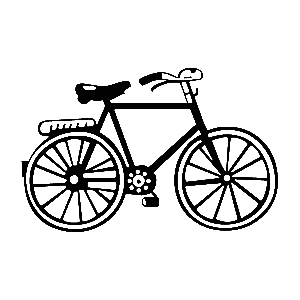
	First party	Second party	Third party
Leader	Farooq Abdullah	Mehbooba Mufti	Ghulam Nabi Azad
Party	JKNC	JKPDP	INC
Last election	28	16	20
Seats won	28	21	17
Seat change	Steady	▲5	▼3
Percentage	23.07%	15.39%	17.71%
Swing	▼5.17%	▲6.11%	▼6.53%
	Fourth party	Fifth party
Leader	Nirmal Kumar Singh	Bhim Singh
Party	BJP	JKNPP
Last election	1	4
Seats won	11	3
Seat change	▲10	▼1
Percentage	12.45%	3.33%
Swing	▲3.88%	▼0.5%
Chief Minister before election
Ghulam Nabi Azad
INC
Elected Chief Minister
Omar Abdullah
JKNC

Elections for the Indian state of Jammu and Kashmir were held over seven days in November and December 2008. The previous government led by the Jammu and Kashmir People's Democratic Party (PDP) in coalition with the Indian National Congress (INC) collapsed when the PDP withdrew. Following the election, the Jammu & Kashmir National Conference (NC) agreed on a coalition with Congress and their leader, Omar Abdullah became the state's youngest-ever Chief Minister at 38.

== Background ==
Elections for the Jammu and Kashmir state Assembly were due in 2008, following the end of the term of the Assembly elected in 2002. However, the PDP withdrew from the INC-led state government in protest at the Amarnath land transfer decision. The INC government resigned in July 2008 and the state was brought under the direct rule of the central government pending the elections.

== Parties ==
Party	Flag	Electoral symbol	Leader	Seats contested
Indian National Congress			Ghulam Nabi Azad	78
Jammu & Kashmir National Conference			Farooq Abdullah	85
Jammu & Kashmir Peoples Democratic Party			Mufti Mohammed Sayeed	78
Bharatiya Janata Party			Nirmal Kumar Singh	64

== Boycott ==
The main Kashmiri separatist group, the All Parties Hurriyat Conference called on Kashmiris to boycott the elections, saying the elections were a "futile exercise" that would never "fulfill the aspirations of the people".

Despite these boycott calls, NC leaders claimed that activists from Jamaat-e-Islami had come out and voted for the PDP.

There were scattered separatist protests throughout the elections, including hundreds who protested in Srinagar. Police prevented these protestors from marching to the center of the city which led to protestors throwing stones at the police who fired tear gas and used baton charges.

== Security ==
Indian election officials voiced major concerns about the security of the elections given the calls for a boycott and protest from separatist leaders and the recent violence over the Amarnath land transfer controversy. Voting was staggered so that security forces could maintain control. Thousands of security forces were deployed during the voting. In Srinagar, security forces were posted at junctions, patrolled the streets, and guarded polling stations. An unofficial curfew was enforced, gatherings of more than five people banned and neighborhoods were sealed off with steel barricades and razor wire.

Police also arrested three men they accused of being Jaish-e-Mohammed members planning suicide attacks in Jammu. One of those arrested was a soldier in the Army of Pakistan, who Pakistan said had deserted in 2006. However following the polls the NC leader, Farooq Abdullah, thanked the Pakistan government for their "non-interference" with the polls.

== Results ==
The seven stages of the elections were held as follows:

Voting stages

Date	Seats	Turnout
Monday 17 November	10	69.02%
Sunday 23 November	6	68.29%
Sunday 30 November	5	68.22%
Sunday 7 December	18	59.24%
Saturday 13 December	11	58.5%
Wednesday 17 December	16	65.93%
Wednesday 24 December	21	52.0%
Total	87	60.5%

Turnout rose by 17%, despite calls from Kashmiri separatists and Pakistan for Kashmiris to boycott the election. INC head Sonia Gandhi described the polls as "a triumph of Indian democracy".

Separatist supporters were said to have backed the PDP. The BJP's increase in support was said to be due to polarisation arising from the Amarnath land transfer controversy, which led it to increase its seat tally from 1 to 11 seats.

1,354 candidates stood for election including 517 independents and nominees from 43 political parties.

=== Summary ===
Summary of the November - December 2008 Jammu and Kashmir state assembly election results
Party	Flag	Seats	+/–
National Conference		28	0
People's Democratic Party		21	▲5
Indian National Congress		17	▼3
Bharatiya Janata Party		11	▲10
Jammu & Kashmir National Panthers Party		3	▼1
Communist Party of India (Marxist)		1	▼1
People's Democratic Front		1	
Jammu & Kashmir Democratic Party Nationalist		1	
Independents		4	
Total (turnout 60.5%)		87	
Source: Electoral Commission of India

== Elected members ==
=== Results by constituency ===
Winner, runner-up, voter turnout, and victory margin in every constituency
Assembly Constituency		Turnout	Winner				Runner Up				Margin
#k	Names	%	Candidate	Party	Votes	%	Candidate	Party	Votes	%	Margin
1	Karnah	79.65%	Kafil-ur-Rehman	JKNC	4,110	19.15%	Abdul Rehman Bhadana	JKANC	2,962	13.8%	1,148
2	Kupwara	62.43%	Saifullah Mir	JKNC	16,696	30.07%	Fayaz Ahmad Mir	JKPDP	11,514	20.74%	5,182
3	Lolab	68.15%	Abdul Haq Khan	JKPDP	23,337	40.67%	Qaysar Jamshaid Lone	JKNC	17,990	31.35%	5,347
4	Handwara	75.58%	Chowdary Mohammed Ramzan	JKNC	27,907	48.38%	Ghulam Mohi-Ud-Din Sofi	Independent	16,317	28.29%	11,590
5	Langate	61.33%	Sheikh Abdul Rashid	Independent	7,964	21.86%	Mohammed Sultan Pandithpori	JKPDP	7,754	21.29%	210
6	Uri	81.73%	Taj Mohiuddin	INC	24,036	44.54%	Mohammad Shafi	JKNC	22,157	41.06%	1,879
7	Rafiabad	51.86%	Javid Ahmad Dar	JKNC	13,198	35.89%	Mohammad Dilawar Mir	JKPDP	12,982	35.3%	216
8	Sopore	19.96%	Mohammed Ashraf Ganie	JKNC	4,368	24.24%	Abdul Rashid Dar	INC	3,304	18.34%	1,064
9	Gurez	74.02%	Nazir Ahmad Khan	JKNC	5,817	51.06%	Faqeer Ahmad Khan	INC	5,085	44.64%	732
10	Bandipora	57.08%	Nizam Uddin Bhat	JKPDP	13,051	26.1%	Usman Abdul Majid	Independent	12,231	24.46%	820
11	Sonawari	59.95%	Mohammad Akbar Lone	JKNC	20,108	39.74%	Abid Hussain Ansari	Independent	7,951	15.71%	12,157
12	Sangrama	46.61%	Syed Basharat Ahmad	JKPDP	7,812	28.09%	Shoaib Nabi Lone	Independent	6,482	23.31%	1,330
13	Baramulla	33.31%	Muzaffar Hussain Baig	JKPDP	13,019	53.46%	Nazir Hussain Khan	JKNC	7,621	31.29%	5,398
14	Gulmarg	59.8%	Ghulam Hassan Mir	Jammu & Kashmir Democratic Party Nationalist	18,253	36.81%	Sheikh Mustafa Kamal	JKNC	11,812	23.82%	6,441
15	Pattan	50.84%	Iftikhar Hussain Ansari	JKPDP	20,703	51.14%	Abdul Rashid Shaheen	JKNC	9,432	23.3%	11,271
16	Kangan	59.53%	Mian Altaf Ahmed Larvi	JKNC	19,210	54.98%	Mian Bashir Ahmed	JKPDP	11,495	32.9%	7,715
17	Ganderbal	51.73%	Omar Abdullah	JKNC	16,519	41.49%	Qazi Mohammad Afzal	JKPDP	8,304	20.85%	8,215
18	Hazratbal	28.91%	Farooq Abdullah	JKNC	11,041	44.66%	Asiea	JKPDP	6,769	27.38%	4,272
19	Zadibal	17.3%	Peer Aafaq Ahmed	JKNC	4,335	34.89%	Shahi Jahan Dar	JKPDP	3,094	24.9%	1,241
20	Eidgah	22.07%	Mubarak Ahmed Gul	JKNC	4,457	35.97%	Asifa Tariq Qara	JKPDP	2,778	22.42%	1,679
21	Khanyar	17.41%	Ali Mohammad Sagar	JKNC	6,314	74.16%	Showkat Ahmad Hafiz	JKPDP	806	9.47%	5,508
22	Habba Kadal	11.62%	Shamim Firdous	JKNC	2,374	41.14%	Hira Lal Chatta	BJP	672	11.65%	1,702
23	Amira Kadal	14.96%	Nasir Aslam Wani	JKNC	3,912	34.75%	Parvaiz Ahmed Bhat	JKPDP	3,103	27.56%	809
24	Sonawar	36.66%	Farooq Abdullah	JKNC	7,018	28.23%	Sheikh Ghulam Qadir Pardesi	JKPDP	6,924	27.86%	94
25	Batmaloo	19.96%	Mohammed Irfan Shah	JKNC	9,447	44.83%	Tariq Hameed Karra	JKPDP	6,738	31.97%	2,709
26	Chadoora	53.79%	Javaid Mustafa Mir	JKPDP	16,278	41.36%	Ali Mohammad Dar	JKNC	13,338	33.89%	2,940
27	Budgam	55.17%	Aga Syed Ruhullah Mehdi	JKNC	19,652	40.15%	Mohammed Kamal Malik	JKPDP	9,692	19.8%	9,960
28	Beerwah	57.18%	Shafi Ahmad Wani	JKPDP	11,720	24.42%	Abdul Majid Matoo	JKNC	11,556	24.08%	164
29	Khan Sahib	74.73%	Hakeem Mohammad Yaseen Shah	People's Democratic Front (Jammu and Kashmir)	22,616	41.94%	Saif Ud Din Bhat	JKPDP	14,221	26.37%	8,395
30	Charari Sharief	74.58%	Abdul Rahim Rather	JKNC	24,579	48.3%	Ghulam Nabi Lone	JKPDP	18,204	35.78%	6,375
31	Tral	48.69%	Mushtaq Ahmad Shah	JKPDP	10,393	28.47%	Mohammed Ashraf Bhat	JKNC	6,586	18.04%	3,807
32	Pampore	43.43%	Zahoor Ahmad Mir	JKPDP	11,117	36.84%	Mohammed Anwar Bhat	INC	5,969	19.78%	5,148
33	Pulwama	40.84%	Mohammad Khalil Bandh	JKPDP	10,639	36.45%	Sonaullah Dar	Independent	4,003	13.71%	6,636
34	Rajpora	50.61%	Syed Bashir Ahmad Shah	JKPDP	10,177	25.12%	Ghulam Mohi Uddin Mir	Independent	9,230	22.79%	947
35	Wachi	48.55%	Mehbooba Mufti	JKPDP	12,810	37.96%	Showkat Hussain Ganie	JKNC	4,474	13.26%	8,336
36	Shopian	52.72%	Abdul Razaq Wagay	JKPDP	8,006	21.23%	Mohammed Shafi	INC	5,208	13.81%	2,798
37	Noorabad	74.1%	Sakeena Akhtar	JKNC	16,240	35.23%	Abdul Aziz Zargar	JKPDP	11,722	25.43%	4,518
38	Kulgam	61.61%	Mohamad Yousuf Tarigami	CPI(M)	17,175	34.24%	Nazir Ahmad Laway	JKPDP	16,939	33.77%	236
39	Hom Shali Bugh	54.36%	Abdul Gafar Sofi	JKPDP	12,249	33.74%	Abdul Majeed	JKNC	7,439	20.49%	4,810
40	Anantnag	41.22%	Mufti Mohammad Sayeed	JKPDP	12,439	39.49%	Mirza Mehboob Beigh	JKNC	7,548	23.96%	4,891
41	Devsar	68.36%	Mohammed Sartaj Madni	JKPDP	14,175	26.79%	Peerzada Ghulam Ahmad	JKNC	10,174	19.23%	4,001
42	Dooru	69.83%	Ghulam Ahmad Mir	INC	15,870	36.19%	Syed Farooq Ahmad Andrabi	JKPDP	9,952	22.69%	5,918
43	Kokernag	70.35%	Peerzada Mohammad Syed	INC	13,384	26.75%	Ghulam Nabi Bhat	JKNC	12,114	24.21%	1,270
44	Shangus–Anantnag East	69.29%	Peerzada Mansoor Hussain	JKPDP	13,853	27.99%	Gulzar Ahmad Wani	INC	12,423	25.1%	1,430
45	Srigufwara–Bijbehara	60.75%	Abdul Rehman Bhat	JKPDP	23,320	49.88%	Bashir Ahmad Shah Veeri	JKNC	13,046	27.9%	10,274
46	Pahalgam	70.25%	Rafi Ahmad Mir	JKPDP	24,316	49.29%	Altaf Ahmad Wani	JKNC	13,394	27.15%	10,922
47	Nubra	71.26%	Tsetan Namgyal	Independent	4,608	53.48%	Tsewang Rigzin	INC	3,678	42.68%	930
48	Leh	61.05%	Nawang Rigzin	INC	19,008	50.5%	Thupstan Chhewang	Independent	17,485	46.45%	1,523
49	Kargil	75.05%	Qamar Ali Akhoon	JKNC	22,935	53.64%	Haji Nissar Ali	Independent	17,635	41.24%	5,300
50	Zanskar	72.2%	Feroz Ahmed Khan	JKNC	6,552	44.72%	Ghulam Raza	INC	5,634	38.45%	918
51	Kishtwar	74.46%	Sajjad Ahmad Kichloo	JKNC	19,248	37.48%	Sunil Kumar Sharma	BJP	16,783	32.68%	2,465
52	Inderwal	72.81%	Ghulam Mohammad Saroori	INC	22,684	42.67%	Shakti Raj	BJP	12,269	23.08%	10,415
53	Doda	73.05%	Abdul Majid Wani	INC	23,254	44.55%	Khalid Najib Suharwardy	JKNC	16,102	30.85%	7,152
54	Bhaderwah	65.29%	Ghulam Nabi Azad	INC	38,238	62.86%	Daya Krishan	BJP	8,802	14.47%	29,436
55	Ramban (SC)	65.59%	Ashok Kumar	INC	21,779	43.47%	Bali Bhagat	BJP	11,460	22.88%	10,319
56	Banihal	67.94%	Vikar Rasool Wani	INC	8,287	17.38%	Showket Javeed Daing	Independent	5,254	11.02%	3,033
57	Gulabgarh	77.66%	Abdul Ghani Malik	JKNC	14,268	31.28%	Haji Mumtaz Ahmad Khan	Independent	11,020	24.16%	3,248
58	Reasi	73.61%	Baldev Raj	BJP	26,031	37.01%	Jugal Kishore	INC	19,369	27.54%	6,662
59	Gool Arnas	76.7%	Ajaz Ahmed Khan	INC	15,594	37.05%	Ghulam Qadir Mughal	JKNC	12,142	28.85%	3,452
60	Udhampur	68.64%	Balwant Singh Mankotia	JKNPP	25,259	35.49%	Pawan Kumar Gupta	BJP	22,494	31.61%	2,765
61	Chenani	57.37%	Krishan Chander	INC	16,276	35.47%	Dina Nath Bhagat	BJP	9,838	21.44%	6,438
62	Ramnagar	64.54%	Harsh Dev Singh	JKNPP	30,609	47.18%	Vinod Khajuria	BSP	18,463	28.46%	12,146
63	Bani	76.09%	Lal Chand	BJP	11,041	39.57%	Ghulam Haider Malik	JKNC	8,792	31.51%	2,249
64	Basohli	69.8%	Jagdish Raj Sapolia	BJP	16,651	35.25%	Davinder Singh	JKNC	13,770	29.15%	2,881
65	Kathua	72.98%	Charanjit Singh	Independent	19,123	25.82%	Som Raj Majotra	BSP	16,761	22.63%	2,362
66	Billawar	70.9%	Manohar Lal Sharma	INC	22,262	35.78%	Satish Kumar Sharma	BJP	13,879	22.31%	8,383
67	Hiranagar (SC)	66.03%	Durga Dass	BJP	19,730	30.5%	Prem Lal	Independent	16,993	26.27%	2,737
68	Samba (SC)	72.52%	Yash Paul Kundal	JKNPP	14,631	27.15%	Satwant Kour	BJP	12,642	23.45%	1,989
69	Vijaypur	80.27%	Surjeet Singh Slathia	JKNC	21,090	27.21%	Chader Prakash Sharma	BJP	19,878	25.64%	1,212
70	Nagrota	79.33%	Jugal Kishore Sharma	BJP	11,141	22.76%	M. K. Ajat Shatru	JKNC	9,521	19.45%	1,620
71	Gandhinagar	64.15%	Raman Bhalla	INC	33,486	36.34%	Nirmal Singh	BJP	31,223	33.89%	2,263
72	Jammu East	60.71%	Ashok Kumar Khajuria	BJP	15,907	50.72%	Narender Singh	INC	5,474	17.45%	10,433
73	Jammu West	60.85%	Chaman Lal Gupta	BJP	34,288	40.26%	Surinder Singh Shangari	Independent	21,251	24.95%	13,037
74	Bishnah	75.77%	Ashwani Kumar Sharma	Independent	14,078	22.46%	Kamal Verma	BSP	13,589	21.68%	489
75	Ranbir Singh Pora–Jammu South (SC)	76.56%	Gharu Ram Bhagat	BJP	15,902	28.95%	Suman Lata Bhagat	INC	14,272	25.98%	1,630
76	Suchetgarh	79.8%	Sham Lal Choudhary	BJP	17,995	39.39%	Taranjeet Singh	JKNC	10,403	22.77%	7,592
77	Marh	81.97%	Sukh Nandan Kumar	BJP	18,368	35.04%	Ajay Sadhotra	JKNC	11,787	22.49%	6,581
78	Raipur Domana (SC)	70.55%	Bharat Bhushan	BJP	28,685	47.78%	Mulla Ram	INC	16,416	27.34%	12,269
79	Akhnoor	79.68%	Sham Lal Sharma	INC	31,600	47.97%	Govind Ram Sharma	BJP	17,716	26.89%	13,884
80	Chhamb (SC)	78.35%	Tara Chand	INC	25,335	48.59%	Chaman Lal	BJP	22,940	44.%	2,395
81	Nowshera	73.07%	Radhay Sham Sharma	JKNC	16,511	26.47%	Romesh Chander Sharma	INC	12,691	20.35%	3,820
82	Darhal	77.37%	Chowdhary Zulfkar Ali	JKPDP	19,399	28.55%	Mohammed Iqbal Malik	Independent	14,858	21.87%	4,541
83	Rajouri	70.12%	Shabir Ahmed Khan	INC	10,013	13.63%	Tasadiq Hussain	JKPDP	9,680	13.18%	333
84	Kalakote	73.32%	Rachhpal Singh	JKNC	25,314	45.62%	Ashok Kumar Sharma	Independent	13,894	25.04%	11,420
85	Surankote	74.92%	Aslam Chowdhary Mohammad	INC	28,102	44.22%	Mushtaq Ahmed Shah Bukhari	JKNC	26,051	40.99%	2,051
86	Mendhar	77.85%	Sardar Rafiq Hussain Khan	JKPDP	29,036	47.63%	Javed Ahmed Rana	JKNC	28,294	46.42%	742
87	Poonch Haveli	74.37%	Ajaz Ahmed Jan	JKNC	28,297	39.62%	Chaudhary Bashir Ahmed Naaz	INC	18,364	25.71%	9,933

== Government formation ==
Former National Conference Chief Minister, Farooq Abdullah, said he did not want to return as it "required the energy of a younger man", and nominated his son, Omar Abdullah, and the head of the Jammu & Kashmir National Conference instead.

Congress debated forming a coalition with either Conference or the PDP. It was reported that the PDP had offered to support a Congress candidate for Chief Minister if they joined with them. However, Prime Minister Manmohan Singh and Congress chairperson Sonia Gandhi were reported to favor the largest party to "honor the mandate" of the election.

On 30 December Congress and the National Conference agreed to form a coalition government, with Omar Abdullah as Chief Minister.
