= 2002 Jammu and Kashmir Legislative Assembly election =

State assembly election in India

2002 Jammu and Kashmir state assembly elections
- 16 September 2002 to 8 October 2002

all 87 seats in Legislative Assembly 44 seats needed for a majority
- Registered: 6,165,285
- Turnout: 43.70% (▼10.22%)
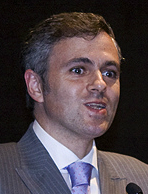

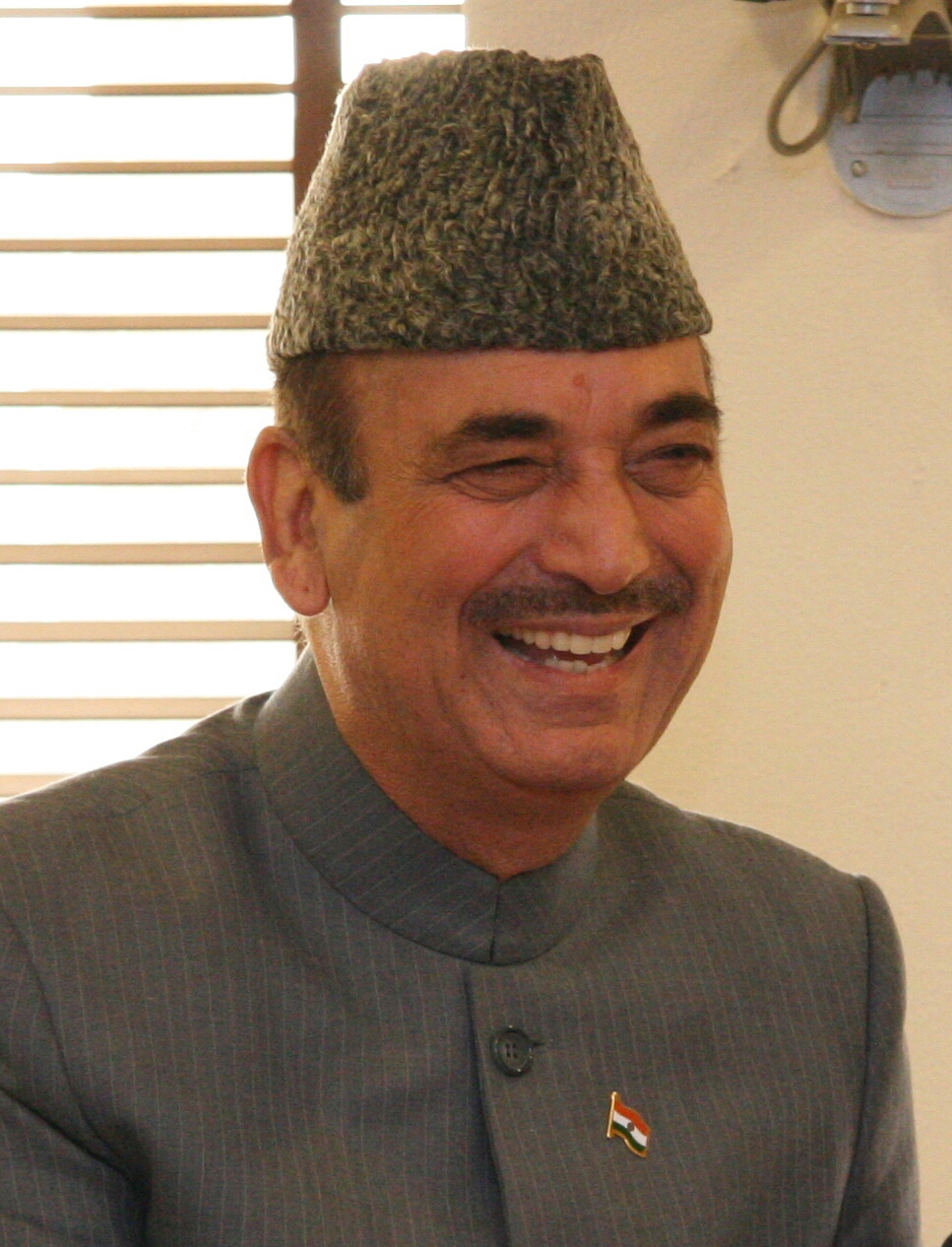

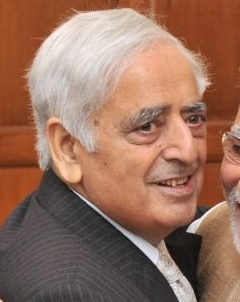

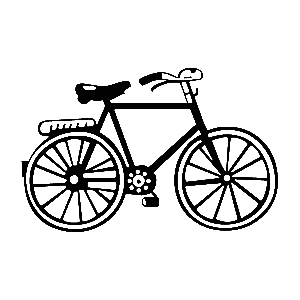

	First party	Second party	Third party
Leader	Omar Abdullah	Ghulam Nabi Azad	Mufti Mohammad Sayeed
Party	JKNC	INC	JKPDP
Last election	57	7	-
Seats won	28	20	16
Seat change	▼29	▲13	▲16
Percentage	28.24%	24.24%	9.28%
Swing	▼6.54%	▲4.24%	▲9.28%
	Fourth party	Fifth party
Leader	Bhim Singh
Party	JKNPP	BJP
Last election	1	8
Seats won	4	1
Seat change	▲3	▼7
Percentage	3.83%	8.57%
Swing	▲1.58%	▼3.56%
Chief Minister before election
Farooq Abdullah
JKNC
Elected Chief Minister
Mufti Mohammad Sayeed
PDP
(in coalition with the INC and JKNPP)

Elections for the Indian state of Jammu and Kashmir were held in September -October 2002 in four phases.

Jammu & Kashmir National Conference was the single largest party but lacked majority. The Jammu and Kashmir People's Democratic Party (PDP) and the Indian National Congress (Congress) formed a coalition government with PDP's Mufti Mohammad Sayeed serving as the Chief Minister for the first three years and Congress's Ghulam Nabi Azad for the next three years. The election saw a major boycott at the appeal of Tehreek -e-Hurriyat.Kashmir division had a voting percentage of 3.5% while Jammu division had a voting percentage of 16.5%.Rajouri district recorded the least voting percentage at 2.7% The Panthers Party formed part of the ruling coalition with Harsh Dev Singh as the party's first cabinet minister.

Electronic Voting Machines (EVMs) were used for first time in Jammu Kashmir assembly elections in 2002. The international community also appreciated the credibility of the elections and the results that followed it. The elections was seen as a victory of the ballot over the bullet. United States lauded 2002 elections of the state. There were 1.7 million voters in the state for 2002 elections.

== Parties ==
Party	Flag	Electoral symbol	Leader	Seats contested
Indian National Congress			Ghulam Nabi Azad	78
Jammu & Kashmir National Conference			Farooq Abdulla	85
Jammu & Kashmir Peoples Democratic Party			Mufti Mohammed Sayeed	59
Bharatiya Janata Party			Nirmal Kumar Singh	58

== Voting ==
Voting stages

The first phase voting took place on 16 September 2002. There was a polling station for just 11 voters in Zanskar. BJP contested on 52 seats while Jammu State Morcha contested on 12 seats. National Conference president Omar Abdullah contested from Ganderbal seat. Separatists had varied views on the elections ranging from voting to boycott of elections.

The four stages of the elections were held as follows:

Date	Seats	Turnout
Monday 16 September	23	47.28%
Sunday 24 November	28	42%
Sunday 1 October	5	41%
Sunday 8 October	18	46%
Total	87	45%

== Results ==
Summary of the Jammu and Kashmir state assembly election results
Party	Seats	Previously	+/–	Vote %	Vote Share
National Conference	28	57	▼29	28.24%	7,49,825
Indian National Congress	20	7	▲13	24.24%	6,43,751
People's Democratic Party	16	-	▲16	9.28%	2,46,480
Jammu & Kashmir National Panthers Party	4	1	▲3	3.83%	1,01,830
Communist Party of India (Marxist)	2		0	0.88%	23493
Bharatiya Janata Party	1	8	▼7	8.57%	2,27,633
Bahujan Samaj Party	1	4	▼3	4.50%	1,19,492
Democratic Movement	1			0.62%	16,366
Jammu and Kashmir Awami League	1	1	0	0.91%	24,121
Independents	13			16.50%	4,38,287
Total (turnout 43.70%)	87	87		-	-
Valid votes		26,55,570	99.90		
Invalid votes		584	0.10		
Votes cast / turnout		26,56,627	43.70		
Abstentions		24,94,170	56.30%		
Registered voters		60,78,570			
Source:Election Commission of India

JKNC became the single largest party with 28 seats. Congress became the second largest party with 25 seats.

Farooq Abdullah resigned as a chief minister on 24 December 2002.

== Results by constituency ==
Winner, runner-up, voter turnout, and victory margin in every constituency
Assembly Constituency		Turnout	Winner				Runner Up				Margin
#k	Names	%	Candidate	Party	Votes	%	Candidate	Party	Votes	%	Margin
1	Karnah	65.37%	Kafil-ur-Rehman	JKNC	8,707	46.02%	Mohammed Sikander Khan	INC	6,719	35.51%	1,988
2	Kupwara	55.23%	Saifullah Mir	JKNC	19,233	43.24%	Ghulam Qadir Mir	Independent	19,101	42.94%	132
3	Lolab	46.89%	Qaysar Jamshaid Lone	JKNC	14,408	42.26%	Abdul Haq Khan	Independent	12,412	36.41%	1,996
4	Handwara	51.48%	Ghulam Mohi-Ud-Din Sofi	Independent	15,389	46.67%	Chowdary Mohammed Ramzan	JKNC	12,392	37.58%	2,997
5	Langate	53.97%	Sharifuddin Shariq	JKNC	8,058	30.16%	M. Sultan Pandithpori	JKPDP	5,658	21.18%	2,400
6	Uri	66.49%	Taj Mohiuddin	INC	20,460	48.51%	Mohammad Shafi	JKNC	20,276	48.08%	184
7	Rafiabad	52.55%	Mohammad Dilawar Mir	JKNC	11,576	35.%	Abdul Gani Vakil	INC	10,944	33.09%	632
8	Sopore	8.09%	Abdul Rashid Dar	INC	2,062	33.19%	Abdul Ahad Vakil	JKNC	1,515	24.39%	547
9	Gurez	76.5%	Nazir Ahmad Khan	JKNC	5,782	53.45%	Faqir Mohammed Khan	Independent	4,532	41.9%	1,250
10	Bandipora	31.27%	Usman Abdul Majid	JKAL	5,722	25.8%	Habibullah Bhat	INC	5,469	24.66%	253
11	Sonawari	56.51%	Mohammad Akbar Lone	JKNC	25,687	58.05%	Mohammad Yusuf Parray	JKAL	12,929	29.22%	12,758
12	Sangrama	22.11%	Ghulam Nabi Lone	JKPDP	3,697	35.91%	Mohammed Yousuf	JKNC	2,638	25.63%	1,059
13	Baramulla	24.15%	Muzaffar Hussain Baig	JKPDP	6,833	38.62%	Ghulam Nabi Kachru	JKNC	3,984	22.52%	2,849
14	Gulmarg	50.52%	Ghulam Hassan Mir	JKPDP	27,737	78.16%	Sheikh Mustafa Kamal	JKNC	7,749	21.84%	19,988
15	Pattan	41.56%	Iftikhar Hussain Ansari	JKNC	15,268	52.63%	Dr.Abdul Ahad Yatoo	INC	13,084	45.1%	2,184
16	Kangan	52.03%	Mian Altaf Ahmed Larvi	JKNC	16,987	64.71%	Ghulam Mohammed Dar	JKPDP	5,948	22.66%	11,039
17	Ganderbal	35.21%	Qazi Mohammad Afzal	JKPDP	11,622	48.26%	Omar Abdullah	JKNC	8,752	36.34%	2,870
18	Hazratbal	7.12%	Mohammed Syed Akhoon	JKNC	3,042	49.79%	Ghulam Mohi-Ud-Din Akhoon	JKPDP	1,639	26.82%	1,403
19	Zadibal	4.78%	Shahjahan Dar	Independent	1,514	46.67%	Khawja Sadiq Ali	JKNC	1,220	37.61%	294
20	Eidgah	4.75%	Mubarak Ahmed Gul	JKNC	2,026	60.62%	Mohammed Ashraf Bakashi	Independent	747	22.35%	1,279
21	Khanyar	4.22%	Ali Mohammad Sagar	JKNC	2,868	93.85%	Mushtaq Ahmad	INC	127	4.16%	2,741
22	Habba Kadal	3.21%	Raman Mattoo	Independent	587	28.47%	Hira Lal Chatta	BJP	416	20.17%	171
23	Amira Kadal	3.06%	Mohammad Shafi Bhat	INC	1,163	51.01%	Ghulam Nabi Mir	JKNC	672	29.47%	491
24	Sonawar	9.96%	Mohammed Yasin Shah	JKNC	3,445	54.66%	Ghulam Hussain Wani	JKPDP	1,740	27.61%	1,705
25	Batmaloo	4.%	Ghulam Mohi-Ud-Din Shah	JKNC	2,065	49.51%	Tariq Hameed Karra	JKPDP	1,223	29.32%	842
26	Chadoora	52.45%	Javaid Mustafa Mir	JKPDP	15,923	58.03%	Ali Mohammad Dar	JKNC	7,876	28.7%	8,047
27	Budgam	33.41%	Aga Syed Ruhullah Mehdi	JKNC	11,398	50.59%	Aga Syed Mahmood Almosvi	Independent	4,753	21.1%	6,645
28	Beerwah	35.06%	Mohammed Sarfraz Khan	JKPDP	16,886	66.%	Mohammed Amin Banday	JKNC	4,966	19.41%	11,920
29	Khan Sahib	49.51%	Hakeem Mohammad Yaseen Shah	Independent	20,186	67.22%	Abdul Gani Naseem	JKNC	4,393	14.63%	15,793
30	Charari Sharief	63.71%	Abdul Rahim Rather	JKNC	20,275	51.29%	Ghulam Nabi Lone	JKPDP	16,520	41.79%	3,755
31	Tral	11.55%	Ghulam Nabi Bhat	JKNC	3,253	47.3%	Surinder Singh	INC	2,944	42.8%	309
32	Pampore	19.17%	Abdul Aziz Mir	JKPDP	3,811	38.46%	Mohammed Anwar Bhat	INC	3,106	31.35%	705
33	Pulwama	18.13%	Mohammad Khalil Band	JKPDP	5,209	53.09%	Bashir Ahmad Nengroo	JKNC	2,782	28.36%	2,427
34	Rajpora	36.71%	Syed Bashir Ahmad	JKPDP	13,946	58.6%	Ghulam Mohi Uddin Mir	JKNC	5,860	24.62%	8,086
35	Wachi	28.29%	Khalil Naik	CPI(M)	4,133	29.19%	Ghulam Hassan Bhat	JKPDP	4,053	28.62%	80
36	Shopian	26.91%	Ghulam Hassan Khan	JKPDP	4,083	27.2%	Sheikh Mohammed Rafi	JKNC	3,363	22.4%	720
37	Noorabad	23.41%	Abdul Aziz Zargar	JKPDP	3,616	29.74%	Sakeena Akhtar	JKNC	3,301	27.15%	315
38	Kulgam	24.4%	Mohamad Yousuf Tarigami	CPI(M)	8,346	51.72%	Ghulam Nabi Dar	JKNC	3,461	21.45%	4,885
39	Hom Shali Bugh	22.93%	Abdul Gafar Sofi	JKPDP	6,803	58.59%	Mohammed Amin Dar	CPI(M)	2,327	20.04%	4,476
40	Anantnag	7.16%	Dr. Mehboob Beigh	JKNC	3,513	70.23%	Liyakat Ali Khan	JKAL	652	13.03%	2,861
41	Devsar	35.56%	Mohammed Sartaj Madni	JKPDP	8,721	38.52%	Mohammed Yaqub	CPI(M)	5,695	25.16%	3,026
42	Dooru	40.48%	Ghulam Ahmad Mir	INC	14,461	66.19%	Syed Manzoor Ahmad	JKNC	3,119	14.28%	11,342
43	Kokernag	15.27%	Peerzada Mohammad Syed	INC	3,356	38.06%	Ghulam Rasool Malik	JKPDP	2,920	33.12%	436
44	Shangus–Anantnag East	25.4%	Peer Mohammed Hussain	JKPDP	5,115	37.07%	Gulzar Ahmad Wani	INC	4,774	34.6%	341
45	Srigufwara–Bijbehara	16.67%	Abdul Rehman Bhat	JKPDP	5,961	58.32%	Abdul Gani Shah	JKNC	2,084	20.39%	3,877
46	Pahalgam	33.02%	Mehbooba Mufti	JKPDP	8,544	45.11%	Rafi Ahmed Mir	JKNC	6,405	33.82%	2,139
47	Kargil	74.83%	Haji Nissar Ali	Independent	27,384	56.61%	Qamar Ali Akhoon	JKNC	20,988	43.39%	6,396
48	Zanskar	78.97%	Mohammed Abass	JKNC	8,580	47.67%	Tsering Chhosphel	Independent	5,393	29.96%	3,187
49	Kishtwar	54.82%	Sajjad Hussain	JKNC	16,725	41.32%	Ghulam Haider Sheikh	INC	15,062	37.21%	1,663
50	Inderwal	56.61%	Ghulam Mohammad Saroori	INC	24,551	64.75%	Jalal-Ud-Din	JKNC	5,667	14.95%	18,884
51	Doda	55.54%	Abdul Majid Wani	Independent	13,799	35.29%	Khalid Najib Soharawardy	JKNC	13,192	33.74%	607
52	Bhaderwah	54.25%	Mohammed Sharief	INC	16,962	34.18%	Mohammed Aslam	JKNC	10,135	20.42%	6,827
53	Ramban (SC)	57.71%	Dr. Chaman Lal	JKNC	15,220	36.12%	Ashok Kumar	INC	12,681	30.1%	2,539
54	Banihal	40.55%	Molvi Abdul Rashid	Independent	11,393	47.51%	Mohammed Farooq Mir	JKNC	4,719	19.68%	6,674
55	Gulabgarh	55.99%	Abdul Ghani Malik	JKNC	12,476	35.15%	Ajaz Ahmad Khan	Independent	9,546	26.9%	2,930
56	Reasi	62.2%	Jugal Kishore	INC	23,045	36.97%	Baldev Raj	BJP	20,989	33.67%	2,056
57	Gool Arnas	60.08%	Ajaz Ahmed Khan	Independent	10,881	33.36%	Kabala Singh	BJP	5,895	18.08%	4,986
58	Udhampur	58.39%	Balwant Singh Mankotia	JKNPP	24,679	40.39%	Pawan Kumar Gupta	BJP	14,727	24.1%	9,952
59	Chenani (SC)	61.54%	Faquir Nath	JKNPP	17,118	37.42%	Krishan Chander	INC	15,353	33.56%	1,765
60	Ramnagar	60.72%	Harsh Dev Singh	JKNPP	29,914	50.4%	Khalil Allaha Qazi	BSP	13,430	22.63%	16,484
61	Bani	67.63%	Prem Sagar	INC	10,395	42.68%	Ghulam Haider Malik	JKNC	6,708	27.54%	3,687
62	Basohli	63.15%	Chaudhary Lal Singh	INC	18,916	43.61%	Jagdish Raj Sapolia	BJP	15,248	35.15%	3,668
63	Kathua	57.%	Jatinder Singh	DM	16,366	25.56%	Sagar Chand	BSP	13,307	20.79%	3,059
64	Billawar	63.9%	Manohar Lal Sharma	Independent	24,736	47.77%	Balbir Singh	INC	10,175	19.65%	14,561
65	Hiranagar (SC)	60.12%	Girdhari Lal	INC	31,402	54.88%	Gopal Dass	BJP	13,190	23.05%	18,212
66	Samba (SC)	58.47%	Yash Paul Kundal	JKNPP	11,079	25.31%	Swarn Lata	INC	10,333	23.6%	746
67	Vijaypur	64.19%	Manjit Singh	BSP	25,406	39.21%	Surjeet Singh Slathia	JKNC	20,329	31.37%	5,077
68	Nagrota	63.85%	Jugal Kishore Sharma	BJP	10,653	26.82%	Ajatshatru Singh	JKNC	10,586	26.65%	67
69	Gandhinagar	48.46%	Raman Bhalla	INC	37,010	49.81%	Harbans Singh	JKNC	26,517	35.69%	10,493
70	Jammu East	38.67%	Yogesh Kumar Sawhney	INC	11,784	34.91%	Ashok Kumar	BJP	8,448	25.03%	3,336
71	Jammu West	38.69%	Mangat Ram Sharma	INC	25,627	40.47%	Virander Kumar Gupta	Independent	17,704	27.96%	7,923
72	Bishnah	67.43%	Ashwani Kumar Sharma	Independent	17,961	32.72%	Kamal Verma	JKNC	13,298	24.22%	4,663
73	Ranbir Singh Pora–Jammu South (SC)	61.4%	Suman Lata Bhagat	INC	19,669	41.4%	Romesh Lal Mottan	NCP	16,485	34.7%	3,184
74	Suchetgarh	69.81%	Gharu Ram Bhagat	INC	11,344	27.45%	Rajinder Singh Chib	BJP	11,207	27.11%	137
75	Marh	68.83%	Ajay Sadhotra	JKNC	14,959	31.87%	Sukh Nandan Kumar	BJP	13,792	29.39%	1,167
76	Raipur Domana (SC)	61.05%	Mulla Ram	INC	20,538	43.49%	Bharat Bhushan	Independent	8,852	18.74%	11,686
77	Akhnoor	71.27%	Madan Lal Sharma	INC	17,102	29.36%	Govind Ram Sharma	JKNC	16,037	27.54%	1,065
78	Chhamb (SC)	70.47%	Tara Chand	INC	20,630	46.3%	Chhaju Ram Lamba	JKNC	10,296	23.1%	10,334
79	Nowshera	57.86%	Romesh Chander Sharma	INC	20,511	40.25%	Radhey Sham Sharma	JKNC	16,037	31.47%	4,474
80	Darhal	46.61%	Thakur Puran Singh	Independent	11,832	28.09%	Chowdhary Liaqat Ali	JKNC	11,615	27.58%	217
81	Rajouri	27.05%	Mohammed Aslam	JKNC	11,933	40.%	Qamar Hussain	INC	9,255	31.02%	2,678
82	Kalakote	48.66%	Rachpal Singh	JKNC	19,324	46.61%	Ashok Kumar Sharma	INC	18,124	43.71%	1,200
83	Surankote	40.01%	Mushtaq Ahmad Shah	JKNC	15,243	45.84%	Mohammed Aslam	INC	13,271	39.91%	1,972
84	Mendhar	60.29%	Javed Ahmed Rana	JKNC	24,530	51.39%	Rafiq Hussain Khan	Independent	16,665	34.92%	7,865
85	Poonch Haveli	60.73%	Ghulam Mohammed Jan	JKNC	27,364	47.41%	Yeshpal Sharma	INC	26,718	46.3%	646
86	Nubra	-	Sonam Wangchuk Narboo	Independent	Elected Unopposed						
87	Leh	-	Nawang Rigzin Jora	Independent	Elected Unopposed						
