= 1996 Jammu and Kashmir Legislative Assembly election =

State assembly election in India

1996 Jammu and Kashmir state assembly elections
- 17 September 1996

all 87 seats in Legislative Assembly 44 seats needed for a majority
- Registered: 4,761,095
- Turnout: 53.92%(▼20.98%)
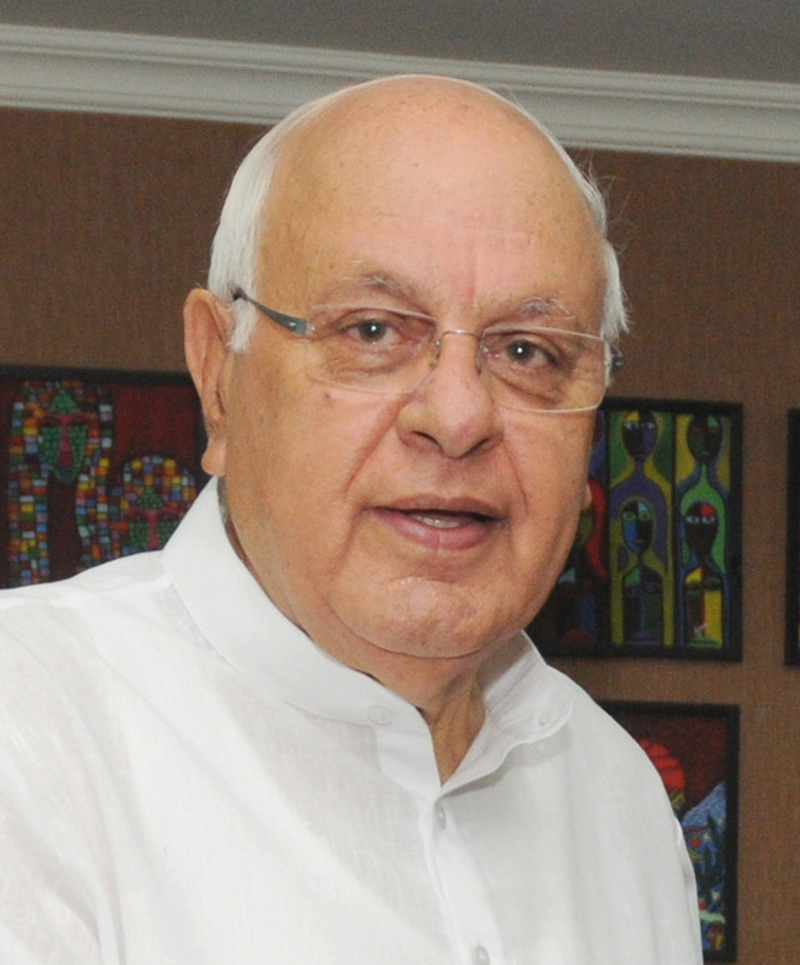

	First party	Second party	Third party
Leader	Farooq Abdullah		Mehbooba Mufti
Party	JKNC	BJP	INC
Leader since			1996
Leader's seat			Bijbehara
Last election	40	2	26
Seats won	57	8	7
Seat change	▲17	▲6	▼19
Percentage	34.78%	12.13%	20.00%
	Fourth party	Fifth party
Leader		Not announced
Party	Janata Dal	BSP
Last election	-	-
Seats won	5	4
Seat change	▲5	▲4
Percentage	10.87%	6.43%
Chief Minister before election
President's rule
Elected Chief Minister
Farooq Abdullah
JKNC

Elections for the Indian state of Jammu and Kashmir were held over September–October 1996. Farooq Abdullah became Chief Minister of Jammu Kashmir after the elections. The 1996 Lok Sabha elections and assembly elections in the state were possible due to efforts of counter-insurgents like Kuka Parray, (head of Ikhwan-ul-Muslemoon).

== Background ==
The National Conference, which had boycotted the 1996 Indian general election, agreed to participate in the 1996 Assembly elections only after Prime Minister, H. D. Deve Gowda, promised "maximum autonomy" for Jammu and Kashmir.

== Parties ==
Party Name	Flag	Electoral Symbol	Leader	Seats contested
Jammu and Kashmir National Conference			Farooq Abdullah	81
Bharatiya Janata Party			Vaid Vishnu Dutt	53
Indian National Congress			Mehbooba Mufti	84

== Results ==
Party	Votes	%	Seats	+/–
Jammu & Kashmir National Conference	863,612	34.78	57	▲17
Indian National Congress	496,628	20.00	7	▼19
Bharatiya Janata Party	301,238	12.13	8	▲6
Janata Dal	269,984	10.87	5	New
Bahujan Samaj Party	159,690	6.43	4	New
Jammu and Kashmir Awami League	60,437	2.43	1	New
Jammu and Kashmir National Panthers Party	55,885	2.25	1	▲1
Communist Party of India (Marxist)	23,774	0.96	1	▲1
All India Indira Congress (Tiwari)	17,473	0.70	1	New
Others	3,090	0.12	0	0
Independents	231,111	9.31	2	▼6
Total	2,482,922	100.00	87	▲11
Valid votes	2,482,922	96.74		
Invalid/blank votes	83,734	3.26		
Total votes	2,566,656	100.00		
Registered voters/turnout	4,761,095	53.91		
Source: ECI

In the 1996 assembly elections, 14 women contested, 10 of whom lost their deposits, while 2 were elected. National Conference won 57 out of 86 seats. BSP contested first time on 29 seats in the state and won 4 seats. BJP rose from two seats in 1987 to 8 seats in 1996.

== Results by constituency ==
Winner, runner-up, voter turnout, and victory margin in every constituency
Assembly Constituency		Turnout	Winner				Runner Up				Margin
#k	Names	%	Candidate	Party	Votes	%	Candidate	Party	Votes	%	Margin
1	Karnah	66.07%	Kafil-ur-Rehman	JKNC	10,739	62.19%	Abdul Rahman Badana	JD	4,311	24.96%	6,428
2	Kupwara	25.97%	Saifullah Mir	JKNC	5,766	37.9%	Chowdhary Salam-U-Din	INC	4,755	31.26%	1,011
3	Lolab	43.82%	Mushtaq Ahmad Lone	JKNC	9,554	37.26%	Abdul Rahim Wani	JD	7,367	28.73%	2,187
4	Handwara	34.82%	Mohammed Ramzan Chowdry	JKNC	10,937	66.71%	Ali Mohammed Dar	INC	3,017	18.4%	7,920
5	Langate	42.67%	Abdul Ahad Wani	JKNC	9,734	61.61%	Ghulam Mohi-Ud-Din War	INC	2,886	18.27%	6,848
6	Uri	70.69%	Mohammad Shafi	JKNC	18,117	53.67%	Taj Mohiuddin	INC	9,731	28.83%	8,386
7	Rafiabad	43.97%	Mohammad Dilawar Mir	JD	9,084	44.2%	Ghulam Mohammed Khan	JKNC	5,666	27.57%	3,418
8	Sopore	38.02%	Abdul Ahad Vakil	JKNC	14,441	64.47%	Ghulam Nabi Mircha	INC	2,842	12.69%	11,599
9	Gurez	76.14%	Faqir Mohammed Khan	Independent	2,175	29.72%	Mohammed Anwar	JKNC	1,398	19.1%	777
10	Bandipora	50.57%	Ghulam Rasool Mir	JKNC	9,625	38.3%	Usman Abdul Majid	JKAL	5,652	22.49%	3,973
11	Sonawari	60.94%	Mohammad Yusuf Parray	JKAL	15,601	41.15%	Mohammad Akbar Lone	JKNC	14,875	39.24%	726
12	Sangrama	60.21%	Mohammed Maqbool	JKNC	9,779	48.86%	Shiekh Mohammed Sadiq	INC	5,160	25.78%	4,619
13	Baramulla	37.47%	Mujahid Mohammed Abdullah	JKNC	7,649	41.28%	Mohammed Sareer Khan	INC	2,474	13.35%	5,175
14	Gulmarg	65.16%	Sheikh Mustafa Kamal	JKNC	18,575	49.23%	Ghulam Hassan Mir	INC	16,822	44.59%	1,753
15	Pattan	71.34%	Iftikhar Hussain Ansari	INC	18,868	45.94%	Abdul Rashid Shaheen	JD	10,540	25.66%	8,328
16	Kangan	63.29%	Mian Altaf Ahmed Larvi	JKNC	21,553	90.23%	Qazi Mohammed Afzal	INC	954	3.99%	20,599
17	Ganderbal	50.62%	Farooq Abdullah	JKNC	16,440	70.25%	Qazi Mohammad Afzal	INC	3,617	15.46%	12,823
18	Hazratbal	23.6%	Mohmmad Syed Akhoon	JKNC	10,109	65.08%	Ghulam Mohi-Ud-Din	BSP	3,855	24.82%	6,254
19	Zadibal	12.68%	Sadiq Ali	JKNC	2,948	49.08%	Abdul Hassan Bhat	JD	1,451	24.16%	1,497
20	Eidgah	20.01%	Mubarak Ahmed Gul	JKNC	8,206	78.12%	Farooq Ahmad	JD	1,035	9.85%	7,171
21	Khanyar	12.66%	Ali Mohammad Sagar	JKNC	6,194	87.52%	Nazir Ahmed	JD	607	8.58%	5,587
22	Habba Kadal	5.37%	Piyare Lal Handoo	JKNC	5,984	59.83%	Sarla Taploo	BJP	1,969	19.69%	4,015
23	Amira Kadal	11.51%	Mohammad Shafi Bhat	JKNC	4,256	63.86%	Mohammed Altaf Dar	JD	968	14.52%	3,288
24	Sonawar	34.5%	Ghulam Mohammed Bawan	JKNC	9,873	58.92%	Bashir Ahmad Kuthoo	JD	3,137	18.72%	6,736
25	Batmaloo	19.44%	Ghulam Mohi-Ud-Din Shah	JKNC	9,583	69.03%	Ghulam Mohammed Sheikh	INC	1,576	11.35%	8,007
26	Chadoora	61.69%	Ali Mohammad Dar	JKNC	11,230	44.78%	Ghulam Nabi Mir	INC	6,134	24.46%	5,096
27	Budgam	67.27%	Syed Ghulam Hussain Geelani	JKNC	15,360	41.51%	Aga Syed Mahmood	INC	13,766	37.21%	1,594
28	Beerwah	70.72%	Aga Syed Mahmood Almosvi	JKNC	19,456	44.68%	Sarfarz Khan	JD	17,798	40.87%	1,658
29	Khan Sahib	63.55%	Abdul Gani Naseem	JKNC	12,785	40.65%	Nazir Ahmad Khan	JD	6,254	19.89%	6,531
30	Charari Sharief	64.13%	Abdul Rahim Rather	JKNC	19,590	60.31%	Ghulam Hassan Wani	JD	6,395	19.69%	13,195
31	Tral	58.3%	Ali Muhammad Naik	JKNC	22,732	77.92%	Krishan Singh	JKNPP	2,127	7.29%	20,605
32	Pampore	61.01%	Mushtaq Ahmad	JKNC	18,112	69.83%	Mohammed Anwar	INC	6,162	23.76%	11,950
33	Pulwama	51.31%	Bashir Ahmad Nengroo	JKNC	12,030	52.46%	Syed Bashir Ahmad	JD	7,398	32.26%	4,632
34	Rajpora	51.63%	Ghulam Mohi Uddin Mir	JKNC	15,455	61.2%	Naba Mir	JD	6,083	24.09%	9,372
35	Wachi	50.93%	Mohammed Jabar Mir	JKNC	12,169	55.85%	Ghulam Hassan Khan	INC	3,113	14.29%	9,056
36	Shopian	48.06%	Shiekh Mohammed Rafi	JKNC	10,340	49.1%	Ghulam Nabi Shah	JD	7,040	33.43%	3,300
37	Noorabad	58.7%	Sakeena Akhtar	JKNC	12,553	53.12%	Gulzar Dar	JD	7,694	32.56%	4,859
38	Kulgam	59.65%	Mohamad Yousuf Tarigami	CPI(M)	21,837	69.65%	Habibullah Laway	JD	5,671	18.09%	16,166
39	Hom Shali Bugh	46.58%	Gul Mohammed Rafiqui	JKNC	5,863	32.2%	Mohammed Sikander	JKAL	3,948	21.68%	1,915
40	Anantnag	34.18%	Safdar Ali Beg	JKNC	6,066	31.5%	Bashir Ahmad Dada	JKAL	5,448	28.29%	618
41	Devsar	51.56%	Peerzada Ghulam Ahmad	JKNC	8,763	35.26%	Mohammed Yousuf	INC	6,777	27.27%	1,986
42	Dooru	49.49%	Ghulam Hassan Wani	JKNC	10,076	46.05%	Ghulam Ahmad Mir	INC	5,175	23.65%	4,901
43	Kokernag	39.03%	Syed Abdul Rashid	JKNC	11,436	49.88%	Abdul Rashid Rather	JKAL	4,145	18.08%	7,291
44	Shangus–Anantnag East	52.35%	Abdul Majeed Mir	JKNC	10,703	44.55%	Gowhar Maqbool	JD	9,710	40.42%	993
45	Srigufwara–Bijbehara	36.26%	Mehbooba Mufti	INC	10,051	45.28%	Abdul Gani Shah	JKNC	7,780	35.05%	2,271
46	Pahalgam	49.51%	Abdul Kabir Bhat	JKNC	13,749	61.81%	Gulshan Akhter	INC	4,078	18.33%	9,671
47	Nubra	64.46%	Tsetan Namgyal	JKNC	3,176	50.66%	Stanzin Tundup	INC	3,093	49.34%	83
48	Leh	57.28%	Chering Dorjay	INC	16,712	51.52%	Sonam Wangchuk Narboo	JKNC	10,225	31.52%	6,487
49	Kargil	80.54%	Qamar Ali Akhoon	JKNC	24,183	57.62%	Hassan Khan	INC	12,104	28.84%	12,079
50	Zanskar	79.92%	Mohammed Abass	JKNC	6,855	46.9%	Kachoo Mohammed Ali Khan	INC	5,559	38.03%	1,296
51	Kishtwar	68.49%	Bashir Ahmed Kichloo	JKNC	17,889	50.61%	Rajinder Singh	BJP	10,900	30.84%	6,989
52	Inderwal	61.27%	Qazi Jalal-Ud-Din	JKNC	11,097	37.87%	Ghulam Mohammad Saroori	Independent	10,002	34.13%	1,095
53	Doda	64.5%	Maulana Attaullah Suharwardy	JKNC	13,230	43.74%	Ghulam Qadir Wani	JD	8,065	26.66%	5,165
54	Bhaderwah	66.73%	Sheikh Abdul Rehman	BSP	21,615	51.23%	Daya Krishan Kotwal	BJP	17,260	40.91%	4,355
55	Ramban (SC)	61.26%	Bali Bhagat	BJP	12,359	46.78%	Suram Chand	JKNC	10,123	38.32%	2,236
56	Banihal	52.26%	Mohammed Farooq Mir	Independent	10,925	46.69%	Molvi Abdul Rashid	JKNC	7,778	33.24%	3,147
57	Gulabgarh	67.01%	Abdul Ghani Malik	JD	11,644	40.87%	Ajaz Ahmad	JKNC	10,688	37.52%	956
58	Reasi	61.24%	Jagjiven Lal	JD	11,974	27.97%	Baldev Raj	BJP	7,072	16.52%	4,902
59	Gool Arnas	58.29%	Abdul Wahid Shan	JKNC	9,783	44.89%	Mohammed Ayub Khan	INC	5,669	26.01%	4,114
60	Udhampur	56.14%	Shiv Charan Gupta	BJP	22,928	57.83%	Balak Ram	INC	7,463	18.82%	15,465
61	Chenani (SC)	47.88%	Prithvi Chand	BJP	10,493	43.08%	Krishan Chander	INC	7,589	31.15%	2,904
62	Ramnagar	53.75%	Harsh Dev Singh	JKNPP	9,049	24.56%	Khalil-Allah	BSP	8,448	22.93%	601
63	Bani	63.94%	Ghulam Haider Malik	JKNC	5,810	34.%	Lal Chand	JD	3,446	20.17%	2,364
64	Basohli	63.6%	Chaudhary Lal Singh	AIIC(T)	12,140	38.44%	Jagdish Raj S/O Tula Ram	INC	7,912	25.05%	4,228
65	Kathua	64.73%	Sagar Chand	BSP	12,130	25.26%	Lal Chand Sharma	Independent	11,001	22.91%	1,129
66	Billawar	62.45%	Balbir Singh	INC	13,354	36.25%	Rajinder Singh	JKNPP	12,722	34.54%	632
67	Hiranagar (SC)	60.75%	Prem Lal	BJP	15,922	35.95%	Girdhari Lal	INC	13,630	30.77%	2,292
68	Samba (SC)	56.31%	Som Nath	BSP	14,107	42.08%	Swaran Lata	INC	8,090	24.13%	6,017
69	Vijaypur	67.49%	Surjeet Singh Slathia	JKNC	17,529	35.75%	Manjit Singh	BSP	17,311	35.3%	218
70	Nagrota	64.56%	Ajatshatru Singh	JKNC	7,849	28.32%	Dhan Raj Bargotra	JD	5,731	20.68%	2,118
71	Gandhinagar	50.55%	Choudhary Piara Singh	BJP	19,779	37.6%	Harbans Singh	JKNC	17,142	32.59%	2,637
72	Jammu East	47.14%	Vaid Vishno Dutt	BJP	19,047	58.67%	Raman Bhalla	INC	6,546	20.16%	12,501
73	Jammu West	43.31%	Hans Raj	BJP	22,506	45.67%	Yogesh Sawhney	INC	10,068	20.43%	12,438
74	Bishnah	69.8%	Jagdish Raj Dubey	JD	10,941	26.43%	Hari Chand	BSP	9,057	21.88%	1,884
75	Ranbir Singh Pora–Jammu South (SC)	67.95%	Ram Chand	BSP	13,379	38.07%	Romesh Lal	INC	11,850	33.72%	1,529
76	Suchetgarh	71.59%	Chuni Lal	BJP	7,925	26.28%	Gharu Ram Bhagat	INC	7,789	25.83%	136
77	Marh	70.68%	Ajay Sadhotra	JKNC	10,072	29.75%	Sukh Nandan Kumar	BJP	9,259	27.35%	813
78	Raipur Domana (SC)	61.69%	Sat Paul	JD	9,076	27.85%	Bansi Lal Bharti	BJP	6,346	19.47%	2,730
79	Akhnoor	72.71%	Govind Ram Sharma	JKNC	8,855	21.02%	Ram Saroop	BJP	8,583	20.38%	272
80	Chhamb (SC)	72.07%	Tara Chand	INC	12,663	35.15%	Tej Ram	BJP	12,001	33.31%	662
81	Nowshera	62.63%	Radhay Sham Sharma	INC	20,238	50.7%	Rattan Singh	JKNC	10,702	26.81%	9,536
82	Darhal	55.41%	Chowdhary Mohmmad Hussain	JKNC	14,969	40.91%	Abdul Rashid Mirza	Independent	9,803	26.79%	5,166
83	Rajouri	65.45%	Mohammed Sharief Tariq	JKNC	25,934	50.73%	Chowdhary Talib Hussain	INC	18,048	35.31%	7,886
84	Kalakote	54.96%	Ashok Kumar Sharma	INC	14,169	45.51%	Puran Singh Thakur	JKNC	4,194	13.47%	9,975
85	Surankote	74.26%	Mushtaq Ahmed Shah	JKNC	27,275	57.78%	Aslam Chowdhary Mohammad	INC	18,743	39.71%	8,532
86	Mendhar	68.59%	Nisar Ahmed Khan	JKNC	16,716	37.47%	Javed Ahmed Rana	Independent	14,256	31.95%	2,460
87	Poonch Haveli	66.94%	Ghulam Mohammed Jan	JKNC	16,150	33.81%	Yeshpal Sharma	JD	10,722	22.45%	5,428
