= Kargil Assembly constituency =

Constituency of the Jammu and Kashmir legislative assembly in India

Coordinates: 34.55°N 76.14°E

Kargil
- Former constituency for the Jammu and Kashmir Legislative Assembly

Constituency details
- Country: India
- Region: North India
- State: Jammu and Kashmir
- District: Kargil
- Established: 1962
- Abolished: 2019

Kargil was a constituency in the Jammu and Kashmir Legislative Assembly of Jammu and Kashmir a north state of India. Kargil was a part of Ladakh Lok Sabha constituency until its abolition.

== Members of the Legislative Assembly ==
Election	Member	Party
1962	Agha Sayad Ibrahim Shah	Jammu & Kashmir National Conference
1967	Kachoo Mohammed Ali Khan	Independent politician
1972	Kachoo Mohammed Ali Khan	Indian National Congress
1977	Munshi Habibullah	Jammu & Kashmir National Conference
1983	Munshi Habibullah	Jammu & Kashmir National Conference
1987	Qamar Ali Akhoon	Jammu & Kashmir National Conference
1996	Qamar Ali Akhoon	Jammu & Kashmir National Conference
2002	Haji Nissar Ali	Independent politician
2008	Qamar Ali Akhoon	Jammu & Kashmir National Conference
2014	Asgar Ali Karbalai	Indian National Congress

== Election results ==
=== Assembly Election 2014 ===
2014 Jammu and Kashmir Legislative Assembly election : Kargil
Party	Candidate	Votes	%	±%
INC	Asgar Ali Karbalai	22,911	50.51%	New
JKPDP	Anayat Ali	12,406	27.35%	New
JKNC	Kachoo Mohammad Hussain	7,363	16.23%	▼37.41
BJP	Abdul Aziz	2,317	5.11%	▲3.48
NOTA	None of the Above	360	0.79%	New
Margin of victory		10,505	23.16%	▲10.77
Turnout		45,357	75.48%	▲0.43
Registered electors		60,094		▲5.47
INC gain from JKNC		Swing	▼3.13	

=== Assembly Election 2008 ===
2008 Jammu and Kashmir Legislative Assembly election : Kargil
Party	Candidate	Votes	%	±%
JKNC	Qamar Ali Akhoon	22,935	53.64%	▲10.25
Independent	Haji Nissar Ali	17,635	41.24%	New
JKANC	Mohammed Ismail	1,131	2.65%	New
BJP	Ahsan Ali	695	1.63%	New
BSP	Ahmad Hussain	361	0.84%	New
Margin of victory		5,300	12.40%	▼0.83
Turnout		42,757	75.05%	▲0.22
Registered electors		56,975		▼11.87
JKNC gain from Independent		Swing	▼2.97	

=== Assembly Election 2002 ===
2002 Jammu and Kashmir Legislative Assembly election : Kargil
Party	Candidate	Votes	%	±%
Independent	Haji Nissar Ali	27,384	56.61%	New
JKNC	Qamar Ali Akhoon	20,988	43.39%	▼14.23
Margin of victory		6,396	13.22%	▼15.56
Turnout		48,372	74.83%	▼4.90
Registered electors		64,646		▲22.80
Independent gain from JKNC		Swing		

=== Assembly Election 1996 ===
1996 Jammu and Kashmir Legislative Assembly election : Kargil
Party	Candidate	Votes	%	±%
JKNC	Qamar Ali Akhoon	24,183	57.62%	▼31.31
INC	Hassan Khan	12,104	28.84%	New
Independent	Nussurullah	4,792	11.42%	New
BJP	Qasim	892	2.13%	New
Margin of victory		12,079	28.78%	▼49.08
Turnout		41,971	80.54%	▲2.31
Registered electors		52,642		▲1.93
JKNC hold		Swing	▼31.31	

=== Assembly Election 1987 ===
1987 Jammu and Kashmir Legislative Assembly election : Kargil
Party	Candidate	Votes	%	±%
JKNC	Qamar Ali Akhoon	35,559	88.93%	▲38.58
Independent	Kachoo Mohammed Ali Khan	4,427	11.07%	New
Margin of victory		31,132	77.86%	▲77.16
Turnout		39,986	78.64%	▲1.95
Registered electors		51,646		▲4.79
JKNC hold		Swing		

=== Assembly Election 1983 ===
1983 Jammu and Kashmir Legislative Assembly election : Kargil
Party	Candidate	Votes	%	±%
JKNC	Munshi Habibullah	18,729	50.35%	▼4.07
INC	Kachoo Mohammed Ali Khan	18,469	49.65%	▲5.38
Margin of victory		260	0.70%	▼9.45
Turnout		37,198	76.80%	▲5.00
Registered electors		49,284		▲39.51
JKNC hold		Swing		

=== Assembly Election 1977 ===
1977 Jammu and Kashmir Legislative Assembly election : Kargil
Party	Candidate	Votes	%	±%
JKNC	Munshi Habibullah	13,549	54.42%	New
INC	Kachoo Mohammed Ali Khan	11,021	44.27%	New
Independent	Chnereng Motup	327	1.31%	New
Margin of victory		2,528	10.15%	
Turnout		24,897	72.87%	▲70.48
Registered electors		35,327		▲3.60
JKNC gain from INC		Swing		

=== Assembly Election 1972 ===
1972 Jammu and Kashmir Legislative Assembly election : Kargil
Party	Candidate	Votes	%	±%
INC	Kachoo Mohammed Ali Khan	Unopposed		
Registered electors		34,099		▲27.10
INC gain from Independent		Swing		

=== Assembly Election 1967 ===
1967 Jammu and Kashmir Legislative Assembly election : Kargil
Party	Candidate	Votes	%	±%
Independent	Kachoo Mohammed Ali Khan	10,868	59.79%	New
INC	A. I. Shah	7,309	40.21%	New
Margin of victory		3,559	19.58%	
Turnout		18,177	67.77%	▲67.75
Registered electors		26,829		▲21.89
Independent gain from JKNC		Swing		

=== Assembly Election 1962 ===
1962 Jammu and Kashmir Legislative Assembly election : Kargil
Party	Candidate	Votes	%	±%
JKNC	Agha Sayad Ibrahim Shah	Unopposed		
Registered electors		22,010		
JKNC win (new seat)				

== See also ==
- Kargil
- Kargil district
