= Abdul Ghani Malik =

Abdul Ghani Malik may refer to:

- Abdul Ghani Malik (footballer)
- Abdul Ghani Malik (politician)
