= Haji Buland Khan =

Indian politician and bureaucrat

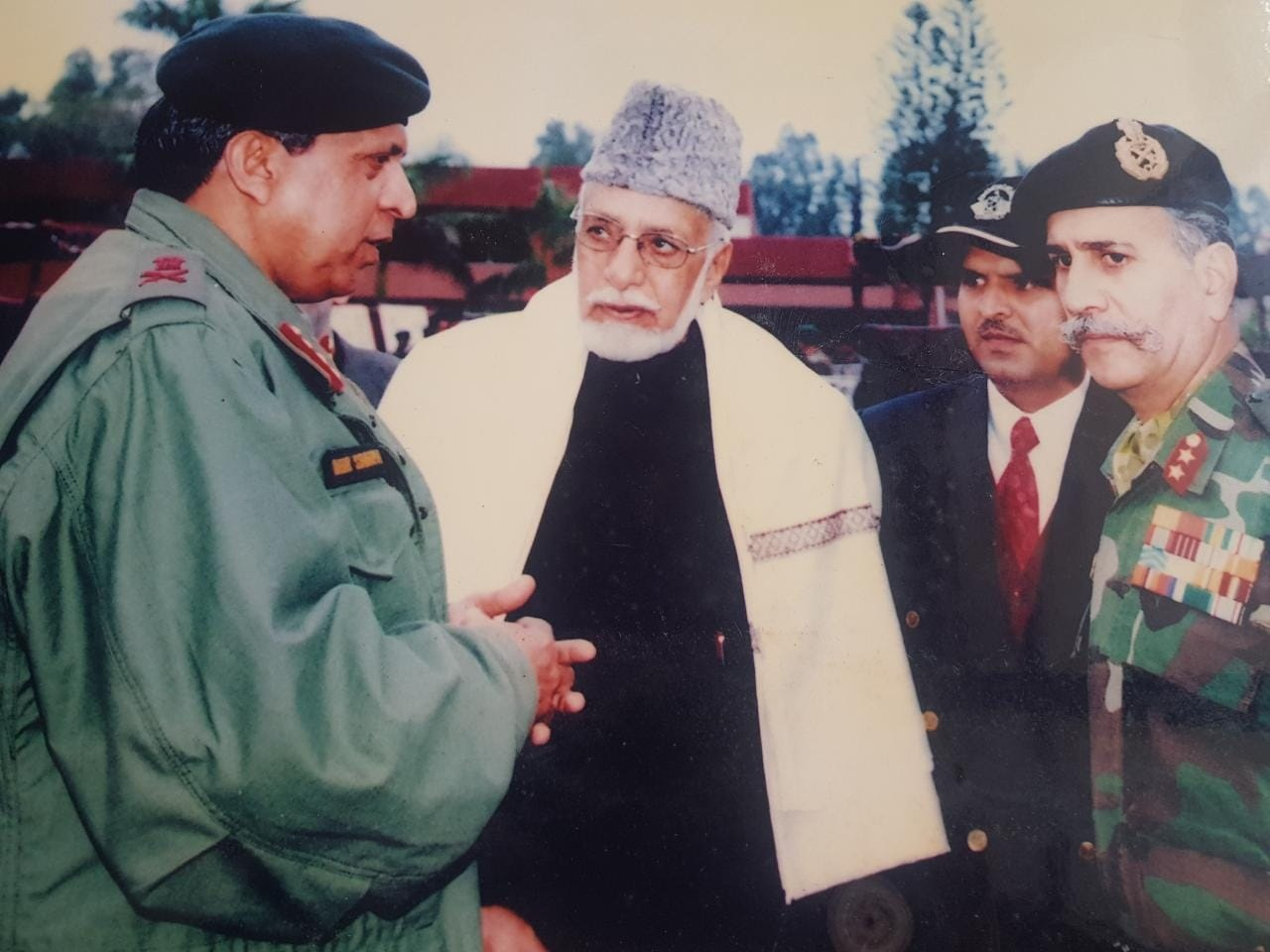
- Sahib (center)

Member of 6th Jammu & Kashmir Legislative Assembly
- In office 1977–1983

Member of 7th Jammu & Kashmir Legislative Assembly
- In office 1983–1987

Member of 8th Jammu & Kashmir Legislative Assembly
- In office 1987–1996

Member of Jammu & Kashmir Legislative Council
- In office 1996–2002

Auditor J&K Co-operative Department
- In office 1955–1960

Personal details
- Born: 1931 Gool, Jammu and Kashmir, India
- Died: June 6, 2007 (aged 75–76) Srinagar, India
- Other political affiliations: All Jammu & Kashmir Plebiscite Front (1962-1977) Jammu & Kashmir National Conference (1977-2007)
- Spouse: Shah Begum
- Relations: Chowdhary Zulfkar Ali (Son-in-Law) (Former Cabinet Minister J&K)
- Children: Ajaz Ahmed Khan (Former Minister) & Haji Mumtaz Ahmad Khan ( EX-MLA)
- Parent: Haji Noor Mohammed

Haji Buland Khan (1931 – 6 June 2007) was an Indian politician and bureaucrat. He was part of the 6th, 7th and 8th Jammu and Kashmir Legislative assembly (Vidhan Sabha).

== Biography ==
Born 1931, Khan represented the Gulabgarh constituency of Reasi district of the erstwhile State of Jammu and Kashmir for 3 times. He was also elected as a member of Jammu and Kashmir Legislative Council in 1996. Khan Sahib also worked as an Auditor in Jammu & Kashmir Co-operative Department from 1955-1960. Khan sahib was also the vice chairman Gujjar and bakerwal advisory board (with mos status) from 1986 to 1990, and from 1997 to 2007. He was also the founder chairman of Gujjar Bakerwal Conference, an organisation dedicated for the upliftment of Gujjar and bakerwal community and held conferences and agitation across the state for the economic, educational, political and social upliftment of downtrodden especially Gujjar and Bakerwal community.

For almost 9 years, he served as Chairman of Panchayat Halqa Thuroo. He served for 14 years as Vice Chairman of Gujar Bakarwal board. In 1962, Khan was requested by Sheikh Abdullah to join Plebiscite Front. Haji Sahib was also jailed in special jail Jammu for six months after joining Plebiscite Front. Khan Sahib was given many life threats but he did not pay attention to that.

In 1996, Sahib did not contest election so ticket was given to his son Ajaz Ahmed Khan. Khan Sahib was elected as Member of Jammu & Kashmir Legislative Council in October 1996 by National Conference. He also represented the problems of his community to Manmohan Singh Ji who was Prime Minister of India at that time and to Sonia Gandhi UPA chairperson back then & Home Minister Shivraj Patil. He died on 6 June 2007, aged 75 or 76, at his official residence at Srinagar after a prolonged illness.

After his death, the state mourned for 3 days by flag down and a 3-day state holiday. His eldest son Ajaz Ahmed Khan represents Gool-Arnas Vidhan sabha Constituency 10th, 11th & 12th Jammu & Kashmir Legislative Assembly & also served as Minister of State. ajaz Ahmed khan sahab is also following the footsteps of haji sahab and doing appreciatable work for the people of ST community as well as for the people of jammu kashmir . Khan Sahib younger son represents Gulabgarh Vidhan sabha Constituency in 12th Jammu & Kashmir Legislative Assembly. Khan Sahib daughter is married to Chowdhary Zulfkar Ali Cabinet Minister in Mehbooba Mufti & Mufti Mohammad Sayeed Govt.
