= Raipur Domana Assembly constituency =

Constituency of the Jammu and Kashmir Legislative Assembly

Coordinates: 32.788°N 74.778°E

Raipur Domana
- Former constituency for the Jammu and Kashmir Legislative Assembly

Constituency details
- Country: India
- State: Jammu and Kashmir
- District: Jammu
- Established: 1996
- Abolished: 2018

Raipur Domana was a legislative constituency in the Jammu and Kashmir Legislative Assembly of Jammu and Kashmir a north state of India. Raipur Domana was also part of Jammu constituency.

== Members of the Legislative Assembly ==
Election	Member	Party
1996	Sat Paul	Janata Dal
2002	Mulla Ram	Indian National Congress
2008	Bharat Bhushan	Bharatiya Janata Party
2014	Bali Bhagat	Bharatiya Janata Party

== Election results ==
=== Assembly Election 2014 ===
2014 Jammu and Kashmir Legislative Assembly election : Raipur Domana
Party	Candidate	Votes	%	±%
BJP	Bali Bhagat	49,134	66.99%	▲19.21
INC	Mulla Ram	16,991	23.17%	▼4.18
JKNC	Sat Paul	2,767	3.77%	▼6.78
JKPDP	Chaman Lal	1,384	1.89%	New
BSP	Behari Lal Digra	1,189	1.62%	▼6.82
NOTA	None of the Above	559	0.76%	New
Margin of victory		32,143	43.83%	▲23.39
Turnout		73,342	74.52%	▲3.97
Registered electors		98,420		▲15.66
BJP hold		Swing	▲19.21	

=== Assembly Election 2008 ===
2008 Jammu and Kashmir Legislative Assembly election : Raipur Domana
Party	Candidate	Votes	%	±%
BJP	Bharat Bhushan	28,685	47.78%	▲35.38
INC	Mulla Ram	16,416	27.34%	▼16.14
JKNC	Sat Paul	6,333	10.55%	▼4.06
BSP	Badri Nath	5,070	8.44%	▲3.87
Independent	Bodh Raj	1,023	1.70%	New
JKANC	Neelam Devi	880	1.47%	New
JKNPP	Dewakar Bhagat	445	0.74%	▼1.79
RKSP	Puran Chand	399	0.66%	New
Margin of victory		12,269	20.44%	▼4.31
Turnout		60,036	70.55%	▲9.50
Registered electors		85,094		▲9.99
BJP gain from INC		Swing	▲4.29	

=== Assembly Election 2002 ===
2002 Jammu and Kashmir Legislative Assembly election : Raipur Domana
Party	Candidate	Votes	%	±%
INC	Mulla Ram	20,538	43.49%	▲29.31
Independent	Bharat Bhushan	8,852	18.74%	New
JKNC	Sat Paul	6,899	14.61%	▼2.51
BJP	Bansi Lal Bharti	5,857	12.40%	▼7.07
BSP	Bal Krishan	2,163	4.58%	▼11.69
JKNPP	Beli Ram Kundal	1,196	2.53%	▲0.01
LJP	Gurnam Singh	467	0.99%	New
JD(U)	Rashpal	378	0.80%	New
Independent	Chaman Lal	349	0.74%	New
Margin of victory		11,686	24.74%	▲16.37
Turnout		47,230	61.05%	▲0.19
Registered electors		77,364		▲44.47
INC gain from JD		Swing	▲15.64	

=== Assembly Election 1996 ===
1996 Jammu and Kashmir Legislative Assembly election : Raipur Domana
Party	Candidate	Votes	%	±%
JD	Sat Paul	9,076	27.85%	New
BJP	Bansi Lal Bharti	6,346	19.47%	New
JKNC	Bharat Bhushan	5,579	17.12%	New
BSP	Amar Nath	5,301	16.27%	New
INC	Beli Ram Kundal	4,619	14.17%	New
JKNPP	Tirth Kumar	821	2.52%	New
Independent	Milkhi Ram	452	1.39%	New
JKAL	Ashok Kumar	395	1.21%	New
Margin of victory		2,730	8.38%	
Turnout		32,589	61.69%	
Registered electors		53,551		
JD win (new seat)				

== See also ==
- Raipur Domana
