= Nubra Assembly constituency =

Former constituency of the Jammu and Kashmir legislative assembly in India

Coordinates: 34.70°N 77.56°E

Nubra
- Former constituency for the Jammu and Kashmir Legislative Assembly

Constituency details
- Country: India
- Region: North India
- State: Jammu and Kashmir
- District: Leh
- Established: 1996
- Abolished: 2019
- Reservation: None

Nubra was a legislative constituency in the erstwhile Jammu and Kashmir Legislative Assembly of Jammu and Kashmir, a former state of India. Nubra was a part of Ladakh Lok Sabha constituency until its abolition.

== Member of Legislative Assembly ==
Election	Member	Party
1996	Tsetan Namgyal	Jammu & Kashmir National Conference
2002	Sonam Wangchuk Narboo	Independent politician
2008	Tsetan Namgyal	Independent politician
2014	Deldan Namgail	Indian National Congress

== Election results ==
=== Assembly Election 2014 ===
2014 Jammu and Kashmir Legislative Assembly election : Nubra
Party	Candidate	Votes	%	±%
INC	Deldan Namgail	3,936	38.00%	▼4.68
JKNC	Tsetan Namgyal	2,318	22.38%	New
BJP	Stanzin Delik	1,947	18.80%	New
JKPDP	Tashi Gyalson	1,415	13.66%	New
Independent	Tsewang Rigzin	534	5.16%	New
Independent	Nisar Hussain	159	1.54%	New
NOTA	None of the Above	49	0.47%	New
Margin of victory		1,618	15.62%	▲4.83
Turnout		10,358	73.41%	▲2.16
Registered electors		14,109		▲16.67
INC gain from Independent		Swing	▼15.48	

=== Assembly Election 2008 ===
2008 Jammu and Kashmir Legislative Assembly election : Nubra
Party	Candidate	Votes	%	±%
Independent	Tsetan Namgyal	4,608	53.48%	New
INC	Tsewang Rigzin	3,678	42.68%	New
Independent	Urgain Chostak	193	2.24%	New
Independent	Ahmad Shah	138	1.60%	New
Margin of victory		930	10.79%	
Turnout		8,617	71.26%	▲71.26
Registered electors		12,093		▼1.23
Independent hold		Swing		

=== Assembly Election 2002 ===
2002 Jammu and Kashmir Legislative Assembly election : Nubra
Party	Candidate	Votes	%	±%
Independent	Sonam Wangchuk Narboo	Unopposed		
Registered electors		12,244		▲24.74
Independent gain from JKNC		Swing		

=== Assembly Election 1996 ===
1996 Jammu and Kashmir Legislative Assembly election : Nubra
Party	Candidate	Votes	%	±%
JKNC	Tsetan Namgyal	3,176	50.66%	New
INC	Stanzin Tundup	3,093	49.34%	New
Margin of victory		83	1.32%	
Turnout		6,269	64.46%	
Registered electors		9,816		
JKNC win (new seat)				

== See also ==
- Leh district
