= Gulabgarh Assembly constituency =

Constituency of the Jammu and Kashmir legislative assembly in India

Coordinates: 33.269°N 76.171°E

Gulabgarh
- Constituency No. 56 for the Jammu and Kashmir Legislative Assembly

Constituency details
- Country: India
- State: Jammu and Kashmir
- District: Reasi
- Lok Sabha constituency: Jammu
- Established: 1962
- Reservation: ST

Member of Legislative Assembly
- Incumbent Khurshied Ahmed
- Party: Jammu & Kashmir National Conference
- Elected year: 2024

Gulabgarh Assembly constituency is one of the 90 constituencies in the Jammu and Kashmir Legislative Assembly of Jammu and Kashmir, a northern union territory of India.

== Members of the Legislative Assembly ==
Election	Member	Party
1967	Mohammed Ayub Khan	Indian National Congress
1972	Mohammed Ayub Khan	Indian National Congress
1977	Haji Buland Khan	Jammu & Kashmir National Conference
1983	Haji Buland Khan	Jammu & Kashmir National Conference
1987	Haji Buland Khan	Jammu & Kashmir National Conference
1996	Abdul Ghani Malik	Janata Dal
2002	Abdul Ghani Malik	Jammu & Kashmir National Conference
2008	Abdul Ghani Malik	Jammu & Kashmir National Conference
2014	Haji Mumtaz Ahmad Khan	Indian National Congress
2024	Khurshied Ahmed	Jammu and Kashmir National Conference

== Election results ==
=== Assembly Election 2024 ===
2024 Jammu and Kashmir Legislative Assembly election : Gulabgarh
Party	Candidate	Votes	%	±%
JKNC	Khurshied Ahmed	30,591	42.82	New
Independent	Aijaz Ahmad Khan	24,064	33.69	New
BJP	Mohammed Akram	12,215	17.10	▲1.48
NOTA	None of the Above	1,743	2.44	▲1.48
JKPDP	Mohammed Farooq	1,688	2.36	▼17.59
Independent	Arshad Ahmed	775	1.08	New
Margin of victory		6,527	9.14	▲5.90
Turnout		71,436	75.45	▼6.64
Registered electors		94,684		▲38.47
JKNC gain from INC		Swing	▲10.82	

=== Assembly Election 2014 ===
2014 Jammu and Kashmir Legislative Assembly election : Gulabgarh
Party	Candidate	Votes	%	±%
INC	Haji Mumtaz Ahmad Khan	17,964	32.00	▲24.81
JKNC	Abdul Ghani Malik	16,148	28.77	▼2.52
JKPDP	Shafiq Ur Rehman	11,202	19.96	▲8.57
BJP	Pardeep Singh	8,767	15.62	▲10.68
HJP	Shaber Ahmed	741	1.32	New
NOTA	None of the Above	539	0.96	New
BSP	Jawahar Singh	425	0.76	▼0.77
JKNPP	Bashir Ud Din	346	0.62	▼2.51
Margin of victory		1,816	3.24	▼3.89
Turnout		56,132	82.09	▲4.43
Registered electors		68,379		▲16.44
INC gain from JKNC		Swing	▲0.72	

=== Assembly Election 2008 ===
2008 Jammu and Kashmir Legislative Assembly election : Gulabgarh
Party	Candidate	Votes	%	±%
JKNC	Abdul Ghani Malik	14,268	31.28	▼3.87
Independent	Haji Mumtaz Ahmad Khan	11,020	24.16	New
JKPDP	Mumtaz Kouser	5,193	11.39	▲8.49
Independent	Prem Singh	4,892	10.73	New
INC	Shafiq-Ur-Rehman	3,280	7.19	▼7.12
BJP	Mohammed Israil	2,252	4.94	▲3.11
JKNPP	Pushminder Singh	1,424	3.12	▲1.66
People's Democratic Front (Jammu and Kashmir)	Mohammed Ayub	735	1.61	New
BSP	Ghulam Jalani	696	1.53	New
Margin of victory		3,248	7.12	▼1.13
Turnout		45,609	77.66	▲21.67
Registered electors		58,727		▼7.35
JKNC hold		Swing	▼3.87	

=== Assembly Election 2002 ===
2002 Jammu and Kashmir Legislative Assembly election : Gulabgarh
Party	Candidate	Votes	%	±%
JKNC	Abdul Ghani Malik	12,476	35.15	▼2.37
Independent	Ajaz Ahmad Khan	9,546	26.90	New
Independent	Prem Singh	5,283	14.89	New
INC	Abdul Gani Bhat	5,079	14.31	▲3.48
JKPDP	Mumtaz Kouser	1,027	2.89	New
BJP	Din Mohammed	650	1.83	▼5.26
JKNPP	Ghulam Mohi-Ud-Din	518	1.46	▲0.09
Independent	Mohammed Saleem Khan	332	0.94	New
Independent	Mohammed Ayub	317	0.89	New
Independent	Abdul Rashid Wani	264	0.74	New
Margin of victory		2,930	8.26	▲4.90
Turnout		35,492	55.99	▼9.97
Registered electors		63,386		▲46.78
JKNC gain from JD		Swing	▼5.72	

=== Assembly Election 1996 ===
1996 Jammu and Kashmir Legislative Assembly election : Gulabgarh
Party	Candidate	Votes	%	±%
JD	Abdul Ghani Malik	11,644	40.87	New
JKNC	Ajaz Ahmad Khan	10,688	37.52	▼10.85
INC	Abdul Ghani Bhat	3,086	10.83	New
BJP	Bhagwan Singh	2,020	7.09	New
Independent	Mohammed Akram	660	2.32	New
JKNPP	Mohammed Ayub	389	1.37	New
Margin of victory		956	3.36	▼10.34
Turnout		28,487	67.01	▼5.51
Registered electors		43,183		▼3.96
JD gain from JKNC		Swing	▼7.50	

=== Assembly Election 1987 ===
1987 Jammu and Kashmir Legislative Assembly election : Gulabgarh
Party	Candidate	Votes	%	±%
JKNC	Haji Buland Khan	15,545	48.37	▼12.09
Independent	Abdul Gani	11,143	34.67	New
Independent	Moulana Saddrud- Din	4,587	14.27	New
Independent	Noor Mohammed	484	1.51	New
Independent	Abdul Rashid	377	1.17	New
Margin of victory		4,402	13.70	▼13.08
Turnout		32,136	72.36	▲10.18
Registered electors		44,962		▲16.14
JKNC hold		Swing	▼12.09	

=== Assembly Election 1983 ===
1983 Jammu and Kashmir Legislative Assembly election : Gulabgarh
Party	Candidate	Votes	%	±%
JKNC	Haji Buland Khan	14,348	60.47	▲2.32
INC	Mohammed Ayub Khan	7,994	33.69	▲12.34
Independent	Ghulam Mohammed Shah	546	2.30	New
Independent	Rashid Shah	428	1.80	New
JKNC	Jamala	413	1.74	▼56.41
Margin of victory		6,354	26.78	▼10.02
Turnout		23,729	62.96	▲14.82
Registered electors		38,712		▲19.93
JKNC hold		Swing	▲2.32	

=== Assembly Election 1977 ===
1977 Jammu and Kashmir Legislative Assembly election : Gulabgarh
Party	Candidate	Votes	%	±%
JKNC	Haji Buland Khan	8,723	58.15	New
INC	Mohammed Ayub Khan	3,203	21.35	▼68.91
JP	Abdul Gnani Bhutt	2,050	13.66	New
Independent	Ghulam Nabi Manhas	689	4.59	New
Independent	Ghulam Mohammed Shan	337	2.25	New
Margin of victory		5,520	36.80	▼44.64
Turnout		15,002	47.60	▼23.55
Registered electors		32,279		▼9.88
JKNC gain from INC		Swing	▼32.11	

=== Assembly Election 1972 ===
1972 Jammu and Kashmir Legislative Assembly election : Gulabgarh
Party	Candidate	Votes	%	±%
INC	Mohammed Ayub Khan	22,638	90.26	▼6.10
Independent	Abdul Ghani	2,213	8.82	New
Independent	Noor Ud Din Kalana	230	0.92	New
Margin of victory		20,425	81.44	▼11.29
Turnout		25,081	71.40	▼5.95
Registered electors		35,818		▲12.51
INC hold		Swing		

=== Assembly Election 1967 ===
1967 Jammu and Kashmir Legislative Assembly election : Gulabgarh
Party	Candidate	Votes	%	±%
INC	Mohammed Ayub Khan	23,307	96.36	New
JKNC	F. Mohammed	880	3.64	New
Margin of victory		22,427	92.72	
Turnout		24,187	88.14	
Registered electors		31,836		
INC win (new seat)				

== See also ==
- Kishtwar district
- List of constituencies of Jammu and Kashmir Legislative Assembly
