= Jewan Lal =

Indian politician from Jammu and Kashmir

Jewan Lal (born 1970) is an Indian politician from Jammu and Kashmir. He is a former MLA from Bani Assembly constituency in Kathua district. He won the 2014 Jammu and Kashmir Legislative Assembly election representing the Bharatiya Janata Party.

== Early life and education ==
Lal is from Bani, Kathua district, Jammu and Kashmir. He is the son of Onkar Singh. He completed his B.Sc. in 1992 at Government Degree College, Kathua. His wife is a government employee.

== Career ==
He is a former tehsildar from Bani Tehsil. Later, he joined active politics and won from Bani Assembly constituency representing Bharatiya Janata Party in the 2014 Jammu and Kashmir Legislative Assembly election. He polled 12,841 votes and defeated his nearest rival, Ghulam Hyder Malik of Jammu and Kashmir National Conference, by a margin of 4,412 votes. He lost in 2024, as a BJP candidate to an independent candidate Rameshwar Singh (politician) by a margin of 2,048 votes.
