= Udhampur Assembly constituency =

Constituency of the Jammu and Kashmir legislative assembly in India

Coordinates: 32.92°N 75.14°E

Udhampur
- Former constituency for the Jammu and Kashmir Legislative Assembly

Constituency details
- Country: India
- State: Jammu and Kashmir
- District: Udhampur
- Established: 1962
- Abolished: 2018

Udhampur was a legislative constituency in the Jammu and Kashmir Legislative Assembly of Jammu and Kashmir a north state of India. Udhampur was also part of Udhampur Lok Sabha constituency.

== Members of the Legislative Assembly ==
Election	Member	Party
1962	Amar Nath Sharma	Jammu & Kashmir National Conference
1967	H. Raj	Indian National Congress
1972	Dev Datt	Indian National Congress
1977	Shiv Charan Gupta	Independent politician
1983	Balak Ram	Indian National Congress
1987	Balak Ram	Indian National Congress
1996	Shiv Charan Gupta	Bharatiya Janata Party
2002	Balwant Singh Mankotia	Jammu and Kashmir National Panthers Party
2008	Balwant Singh Mankotia	Jammu and Kashmir National Panthers Party
2014	Pawan Kumar Gupta	Independent politician

== Election results ==
=== Assembly Election 2014 ===
2014 Jammu and Kashmir Legislative Assembly election : Udhampur
Party	Candidate	Votes	%	±%
Independent	Pawan Kumar Gupta	36,226	42.57%	New
JKNPP	Balwant Singh Mankotia	21,576	25.36%	▼10.14
BJP	Pawan Khajuria	20,174	23.71%	▼7.90
JKNC	Sunil Verma	1,440	1.69%	▼2.38
INC	Ashok Kumar Gupta	1,249	1.47%	▼13.45
JKPDP	Sukhdev Sharma	1,149	1.35%	New
Independent	Soma	1,088	1.28%	New
BSP	Ranjit Singh	882	1.04%	▼8.20
NOTA	None of the Above	653	0.77%	New
Margin of victory		14,650	17.22%	▲13.33
Turnout		85,091	79.44%	▲10.79
Registered electors		1,07,118		▲3.32
Independent gain from JKNPP		Swing	▲7.08	

=== Assembly Election 2008 ===
2008 Jammu and Kashmir Legislative Assembly election : Udhampur
Party	Candidate	Votes	%	±%
JKNPP	Balwant Singh Mankotia	25,259	35.49%	▼4.90
BJP	Pawan Kumar Gupta	22,494	31.61%	▲7.51
INC	Brij Mohan	10,617	14.92%	▼4.10
BSP	Dhani Ram Atri	6,571	9.23%	▲6.81
JKNC	Sunil Verma	2,895	4.07%	▼5.28
Margin of victory		2,765	3.89%	▼12.40
Turnout		71,164	68.64%	▲10.25
Registered electors		1,03,673		▼0.93
JKNPP hold		Swing	▼4.90	

=== Assembly Election 2002 ===
2002 Jammu and Kashmir Legislative Assembly election : Udhampur
Party	Candidate	Votes	%	±%
JKNPP	Balwant Singh Mankotia	24,679	40.39%	▲38.63
BJP	Pawan Kumar Gupta	14,727	24.10%	▼33.73
INC	Yash Paul Khajuria	11,623	19.02%	▲0.20
JKNC	Kuldeep Kumar	5,713	9.35%	▼7.01
BSP	Vijay Kumar	1,478	2.42%	New
Independent	Som Raj	904	1.48%	New
Independent	Rajinder Kumar	489	0.80%	New
JD(U)	Hem Raj Sharma	475	0.78%	New
Margin of victory		9,952	16.29%	▼22.72
Turnout		61,103	58.39%	▲3.12
Registered electors		1,04,642		▲45.89
JKNPP gain from BJP		Swing	▼17.44	

=== Assembly Election 1996 ===
1996 Jammu and Kashmir Legislative Assembly election : Udhampur
Party	Candidate	Votes	%	±%
BJP	Shiv Charan Gupta	22,928	57.83%	▲19.20
INC	Balak Ram	7,463	18.82%	▼34.90
JKNC	Bharat Bhushan	6,487	16.36%	New
JD	Dwarka Nath	1,179	2.97%	New
CPI	Shiv Nath	797	2.01%	New
JKNPP	Balwant Singh Mankotia	696	1.76%	▼1.19
Margin of victory		15,465	39.01%	▲23.92
Turnout		39,645	56.14%	▼8.68
Registered electors		71,725		▲30.75
BJP gain from INC		Swing	▲4.11	

=== Assembly Election 1987 ===
1987 Jammu and Kashmir Legislative Assembly election : Udhampur
Party	Candidate	Votes	%	±%
INC	Balak Ram	18,847	53.72%	▲8.40
BJP	Shiv Charan Gupta	13,552	38.63%	▲16.74
JKNPP	Romesh Kumar Kapoor	1,034	2.95%	New
Independent	Paras Ram	522	1.49%	New
Independent	Gopal Swami	321	0.91%	New
Independent	Romesh Chander	311	0.89%	New
Margin of victory		5,295	15.09%	▼8.34
Turnout		35,082	64.93%	▲5.92
Registered electors		54,857		▲16.20
INC hold		Swing	▲8.40	

=== Assembly Election 1983 ===
1983 Jammu and Kashmir Legislative Assembly election : Udhampur
Party	Candidate	Votes	%	±%
INC	Balak Ram	12,417	45.32%	▲4.01
BJP	Shiv Charan Gupta	5,998	21.89%	New
Independent	Jay Mala	3,768	13.75%	New
JKNC	Gopalswami	2,962	10.81%	▲5.16
CPI	Paras Ram	920	3.36%	New
Independent	Suresh Kumar	233	0.85%	New
Independent	Harpal Singh	225	0.82%	New
Independent	Amrit Sagar	167	0.61%	New
Margin of victory		6,419	23.43%	▲20.60
Turnout		27,396	59.06%	▲5.49
Registered electors		47,211		▲16.93
INC gain from Independent		Swing	▲1.19	

=== Assembly Election 1977 ===
1977 Jammu and Kashmir Legislative Assembly election : Udhampur
Party	Candidate	Votes	%	±%
Independent	Shiv Charan Gupta	9,363	44.14%	New
INC	Faqir Chand	8,763	41.31%	▼18.14
JKNC	Sadhu Ram	1,198	5.65%	New
Independent	Jarnail Singh	723	3.41%	New
Independent	Ashok Kumar	564	2.66%	New
Independent	Govind Ram	246	1.16%	New
Independent	Mohammed Maqbool	135	0.64%	New
Margin of victory		600	2.83%	▼21.73
Turnout		21,213	53.20%	▼8.51
Registered electors		40,375		▲21.00
Independent gain from INC		Swing	▼15.31	

=== Assembly Election 1972 ===
1972 Jammu and Kashmir Legislative Assembly election : Udhampur
Party	Candidate	Votes	%	±%
INC	Dev Datt	12,111	59.45%	▲19.26
ABJS	Paras Ram	7,107	34.89%	▲1.74
INC(O)	Jeewan Lal	499	2.45%	New
Independent	Prehlad Sing	351	1.72%	New
Independent	Kanshi Ram	176	0.86%	New
Independent	Girdhari	128	0.63%	New
Margin of victory		5,004	24.56%	▲17.52
Turnout		20,372	63.04%	▲1.53
Registered electors		33,369		▲9.85
INC hold		Swing	▲19.26	

=== Assembly Election 1967 ===
1967 Jammu and Kashmir Legislative Assembly election : Udhampur
Party	Candidate	Votes	%	±%
INC	H. Raj	7,267	40.19%	New
ABJS	P. Ram	5,993	33.15%	New
Independent	B. Singh	4,201	23.24%	New
Democratic National Conference	N. Nand	481	2.66%	New
Independent	I. Dass	138	0.76%	New
Margin of victory		1,274	7.05%	▲5.88
Turnout		18,080	61.60%	▼1.87
Registered electors		30,378		▲15.58
INC gain from JKNC		Swing	▼9.41	

=== Assembly Election 1962 ===
1962 Jammu and Kashmir Legislative Assembly election : Udhampur
Party	Candidate	Votes	%	±%
JKNC	Amar Nath Sharma	8,003	49.60%	New
JPP	Paras Ram	7,815	48.44%	New
Independent	Shiv Lal	316	1.96%	New
Margin of victory		188	1.17%	
Turnout		16,134	61.94%	
Registered electors		26,282		
JKNC win (new seat)				

== See also ==
- Udhampur
- Udhampur district
