= Rameshwar Singh (politician) =

Indian politician

Member of Jammu and Kashmir Legislative Assembly
- Incumbent
- Assumed office 8 October 2024
- Preceded by: Jewan Lal
- Constituency: Bani Assembly constituency

Personal details
- Profession: Politician

Rameshwar Singh is an Indian politician from Jammu & Kashmir. He is a Member of the Jammu & Kashmir Legislative Assembly from 2024, representing Bani Assembly constituency as an Independent candidate.

== See also ==
- 2024 Jammu & Kashmir Legislative Assembly election
- Jammu and Kashmir Legislative Assembly
