= Bani Assembly constituency =

Constituency of the Jammu and Kashmir Legislative Assembly

Coordinates: 32.706°N 75.814°E

Bani
- Constituency No. 63 for the Jammu and Kashmir Legislative Assembly

Constituency details
- Country: India
- State: Jammu and Kashmir
- District: Kathua
- Lok Sabha constituency: Udhampur
- Established: 1996

Member of Legislative Assembly
- Incumbent Dr Rameshwar Singh
- Party: Independent
- Elected year: 2024

Bani Assembly constituency is one of the 90 constituencies in the Jammu and Kashmir Legislative Assembly of Jammu and Kashmir, a region administered as a union territory of India. Bani is also part of Udhampur Lok Sabha constituency.

== Members of the Legislative Assembly ==
Election	Member	Party
1996	Ghulam Haider Malik	Jammu & Kashmir National Conference
2002	Prem Sagar	Indian National Congress
2008	Lal Chand	Bharatiya Janata Party
2014	Jewan Lal	Bharatiya Janata Party
2024	Dr Rameshwar Singh	Independent politician

== Election results ==
=== Assembly Election 2024 ===
2024 Jammu and Kashmir Legislative Assembly election : Bani
Party	Candidate	Votes	%	±%
Independent	Dr Rameshwar Singh	18,672	43.43%	New
BJP	Jewan Lal	16,624	38.67%	▼0.47
DPAP	Gouri Shanker	4,001	9.31%	New
INC	Ms Kajal	1,970	4.58%	▲0.38
Independent	Jatinder Singh	628	1.46%	New
NOTA	None of the Above	427	0.99%	▲0.07
Independent	Sarfraz Safder	291	0.68%	New
Margin of victory		2,048	4.76%	▼8.68
Turnout		42,992	74.13%	▼4.87
Registered electors		57,999		▲39.65
Independent gain from BJP		Swing	▲4.29	

=== Assembly Election 2014 ===
2014 Jammu and Kashmir Legislative Assembly election : Bani
Party	Candidate	Votes	%	±%
BJP	Jewan Lal	12,841	39.14%	▼0.43
JKNC	Ghulam Haider Malik	8,429	25.69%	▼5.82
Independent	Lal Chand	5,012	15.28%	New
JKNPP	Pawan Dev Singh	2,916	8.89%	▲7.01
INC	Rajnish Sharma	1,379	4.20%	▼11.96
JKPDP	Mohammed Salim Lone	1,087	3.31%	▲0.16
Independent	Madan Lal	310	0.94%	New
NOTA	None of the Above	302	0.92%	New
Independent	Mohammed Rafiq	258	0.79%	New
Margin of victory		4,412	13.45%	▲5.39
Turnout		32,808	78.99%	▲2.90
Registered electors		41,533		▲13.26
BJP hold		Swing	▼0.43	

=== Assembly Election 2008 ===
2008 Jammu and Kashmir Legislative Assembly election : Bani
Party	Candidate	Votes	%	±%
BJP	Lal Chand	11,041	39.57%	▲12.61
JKNC	Ghulam Haider Malik	8,792	31.51%	▲3.97
INC	Prem Sagar	4,510	16.16%	▼26.52
JKPDP	Noor Mohammed Afzal	880	3.15%	▲1.98
SP	Ali Mohammad Lone	633	2.27%	New
Independent	Raj Kumar	599	2.15%	New
JKNPP	Rakesh Singh Thakur	523	1.87%	▲0.89
Independent	Karandev Singh	356	1.28%	New
Independent	Anayat Pervaz	276	0.99%	New
BSP	Tara Chand	238	0.85%	New
Margin of victory		2,249	8.06%	▼7.08
Turnout		27,903	76.09%	▲8.47
Registered electors		36,669		▲1.82
BJP gain from INC		Swing	▼3.11	

=== Assembly Election 2002 ===
2002 Jammu and Kashmir Legislative Assembly election : Bani
Party	Candidate	Votes	%	±%
INC	Prem Sagar	10,395	42.68%	▲26.10
JKNC	Ghulam Haider Malik	6,708	27.54%	▼6.46
BJP	Lal Chand	6,567	26.96%	▲11.77
JKPDP	Romesh Chander	286	1.17%	New
JKNPP	Balwant Singh	239	0.98%	▼1.88
NCP	Sukh Ram	161	0.66%	New
Margin of victory		3,687	15.14%	▲1.30
Turnout		24,356	67.63%	▲4.50
Registered electors		36,015		▲33.05
INC gain from JKNC		Swing	▲8.67	

=== Assembly Election 1996 ===
1996 Jammu and Kashmir Legislative Assembly election : Bani
Party	Candidate	Votes	%	±%
JKNC	Ghulam Haider Malik	5,810	34.00%	New
JD	Lal Chand	3,446	20.17%	New
INC	Prem Sagar	2,832	16.57%	New
BJP	Kasturi Lal	2,595	15.19%	New
Independent	Hari Lal	1,074	6.29%	New
Independent	Tara Chand	506	2.96%	New
JKNPP	Kali Dass	489	2.86%	New
Independent	Amrik Singh	334	1.95%	New
Margin of victory		2,364	13.84%	
Turnout		17,086	63.94%	
Registered electors		27,068		
JKNC win (new seat)				

== See also ==
- Kishtwar
- List of constituencies of Jammu and Kashmir Legislative Assembly
