= Beerwah Assembly constituency =

Constituency of the Jammu and Kashmir Legislative Assembly

Coordinates: 34.015°N 74.591°E

Beerwah
- Constituency No. 28 for the Jammu and Kashmir Legislative Assembly

Constituency details
- Country: India
- State: Jammu and Kashmir
- District: Budgam
- Lok Sabha constituency: Baramulla
- Established: 1967

Member of Legislative Assembly
- Incumbent Shafi Ahmad Wani
- Party: Jammu and Kashmir National Conference
- Elected year: 2024

Beerwah Assembly constituency is one of the 90 constituencies in the Jammu and Kashmir Legislative Assembly of Jammu and Kashmir a north state of India. Beerwah is also part of Baramulla Lok Sabha constituency.

== Members of the Legislative Assembly ==
Election	Member	Party
1967	A. Quddus	Indian National Congress
1972	Abdul Khaliq Mir	Indian National Congress
1977	Ahmad Saeed	Jammu & Kashmir National Conference
1983	Syed Ahmad Syed	Jammu & Kashmir National Conference
1987	Syed Ahmad Syed	Jammu & Kashmir National Conference
1996	Aga Syed Mahmood Almosvi	Jammu & Kashmir National Conference
2002	Mohammed Sarfraz Khan	Jammu and Kashmir People's Democratic Party
2008	Shafi Ahmad Wani	Jammu and Kashmir People's Democratic Party
2014	Omar Abdullah	Jammu & Kashmir National Conference
2024	Shafi Ahmad Wani	Jammu and Kashmir National Conference

== Election results ==
=== Assembly Election 2024 ===
2024 Jammu and Kashmir Legislative Assembly election : Beerwah
Party	Candidate	Votes	%	±%
JKNC	Shafi Ahmad Wani	20,118	30.37%	New
Independent	Nazir Ahmad Khan	15,957	24.09%	New
Independent	Sarjan Ahmad Wagay	12,282	18.54%	New
JKPDP	Ghulam Ahmad Khan	7,718	11.65%	▼13.64
Independent	Farooq Ahmad Ganaie	3,970	5.99%	New
NOTA	None of the Above	1,647	2.49%	▲1.46
Independent	Sanjay Parva	927	1.40%	New
Independent	Mir Fanoon Rafiq	804	1.21%	New
JKANC	Showket Hussain Mir	792	1.20%	New
JKPC	Showket Ahmed Wani	705	1.06%	▼3.41
Jammu and Kashmir National Panthers Party (Bhim)	Ali Mohammad Dar	528	0.80%	New
Margin of victory		4,161	6.28%	▲4.97
Turnout		66,246	67.41%	▼7.17
Registered electors		98,268		▲5.61
JKNC gain from JKNC		Swing	▼3.81	

=== Assembly Election 2014 ===
2014 Jammu and Kashmir Legislative Assembly election : Beerwah
Party	Candidate	Votes	%	±%
JKNC	Omar Abdullah	23,717	34.18%	▲10.10
INC	Nazir Ahmad Khan	22,807	32.86%	New
JKPDP	Shafi Ahmad Wani	17,554	25.30%	▲0.88
JKPC	Dawood Khan Lodhi	3,103	4.47%	New
BJP	Abdul Rashid Banday	1,142	1.65%	New
NOTA	None of the Above	710	1.02%	New
Margin of victory		910	1.31%	▲0.97
Turnout		69,397	74.58%	▲17.41
Registered electors		93,046		▲10.85
JKNC gain from JKPDP		Swing	▲9.76	

=== Assembly Election 2008 ===
2008 Jammu and Kashmir Legislative Assembly election : Beerwah
Party	Candidate	Votes	%	±%
JKPDP	Shafi Ahmad Wani	11,720	24.42%	▼41.59
JKNC	Abdul Majid Matoo	11,556	24.08%	▲4.67
Jammu & Kashmir Democratic Party Nationalist	Nazir Ahmad Khan	9,958	20.75%	New
People's Democratic Front (Jammu and Kashmir)	Sonaullah Dar	4,182	8.71%	New
Independent	Aga Syed Mahmood Almosvi	3,190	6.65%	New
JKANC	Bashir Ahmed Beigh	1,015	2.11%	New
Independent	Mohmmad Sarfaraz Matoo	968	2.02%	New
LJP	Syed Parveez Hilal	946	1.97%	New
BSP	Mohammad Ashraf Lone	837	1.74%	New
SP	Syed Bashir Kauser	783	1.63%	New
Margin of victory		164	0.34%	▼46.25
Turnout		47,995	57.18%	▲22.12
Registered electors		83,941		▲15.03
JKPDP hold		Swing	▼41.59	

=== Assembly Election 2002 ===
2002 Jammu and Kashmir Legislative Assembly election : Beerwah
Party	Candidate	Votes	%	±%
JKPDP	Mohammed Sarfraz Khan	16,886	66.00%	New
JKNC	Mohammed Amin Banday	4,966	19.41%	▼25.26
Independent	Bashir Ahmed Beigh	1,274	4.98%	New
Independent	Mohammed Ramzan Bhat	983	3.84%	New
Independent	Ghulam Mustafa	944	3.69%	New
INC	Ghulam Mohammad Dar	530	2.07%	▼6.11
Margin of victory		11,920	46.59%	▲42.79
Turnout		25,583	35.06%	▼34.08
Registered electors		72,976		▲15.86
JKPDP gain from JKNC		Swing	▲21.33	

=== Assembly Election 1996 ===
1996 Jammu and Kashmir Legislative Assembly election : Beerwah
Party	Candidate	Votes	%	±%
JKNC	Aga Syed Mahmood Almosvi	19,456	44.68%	▼2.61
JD	Sarfarz Khan	17,798	40.87%	New
INC	Abdul Khaliq Mir	3,561	8.18%	New
BSP	Syed Hadi	933	2.14%	New
JKNPP	Mohi-Ud-Din	921	2.11%	New
BJP	Ashok Kumar	881	2.02%	New
Margin of victory		1,658	3.81%	▼12.60
Turnout		43,550	70.72%	▼2.86
Registered electors		62,988		▲39.78
JKNC hold		Swing	▼2.61	

=== Assembly Election 1987 ===
1987 Jammu and Kashmir Legislative Assembly election : Beerwah
Party	Candidate	Votes	%	±%
JKNC	Syed Ahmad Syed	15,341	47.28%	▼13.73
Independent	Ghulam Mohammed Mir	10,016	30.87%	New
JKNC	Bilal Ahmed	3,975	12.25%	▼48.76
Independent	Ghulam Hyder Mir	2,353	7.25%	New
Independent	Kripal Singh	450	1.39%	New
Independent	Abdul Rashid	311	0.96%	New
Margin of victory		5,325	16.41%	▼31.84
Turnout		32,446	74.12%	▲16.17
Registered electors		45,062		▲10.61
JKNC hold		Swing	▼13.73	

=== Assembly Election 1983 ===
1983 Jammu and Kashmir Legislative Assembly election : Beerwah
Party	Candidate	Votes	%	±%
JKNC	Syed Ahmad Syed	13,879	61.01%	▲0.28
JKNC	Abdul Ahad Magray	2,903	12.76%	▼47.97
INC	Mohammed Sarfraz Khan	2,149	9.45%	▲3.45
JI	Ghulam Mohammed Mir	2,090	9.19%	New
Independent	Abdul Khaliq Mir	1,442	6.34%	New
Independent	Abdul Raheem Wani	284	1.25%	New
Margin of victory		10,976	48.25%	▲19.02
Turnout		22,747	63.00%	▼13.90
Registered electors		40,739		▲15.65
JKNC hold		Swing	▲0.28	

=== Assembly Election 1977 ===
1977 Jammu and Kashmir Legislative Assembly election : Beerwah
Party	Candidate	Votes	%	±%
JKNC	Ahmad Saeed	14,918	60.73%	New
JP	Syed Ali Shah	7,737	31.50%	New
INC	Mohammed Sarfraz Khan	1,473	6.00%	New
Independent	Syed Altaf Hussain	435	1.77%	New
Margin of victory		7,181	29.24%	
Turnout		24,563	72.91%	▲69.73
Registered electors		35,225		▲19.37
JKNC gain from INC		Swing		

=== Assembly Election 1972 ===
1972 Jammu and Kashmir Legislative Assembly election : Beerwah
Party	Candidate	Votes	%	±%
INC	Abdul Khaliq Mir	Unopposed		
Registered electors		29,509		▲11.65
INC hold		Swing		

=== Assembly Election 1967 ===
1967 Jammu and Kashmir Legislative Assembly election : Beerwah
Party	Candidate	Votes	%	±%
INC	A. Quddus	Unopposed		
Registered electors		26,429		
INC win (new seat)				

== See also ==
- List of constituencies of Jammu and Kashmir Legislative Assembly
