= Shafi Ahmad Wani =

Indian politician

Member of Jammu and Kashmir Legislative Assembly
- Incumbent
- Assumed office 8 October 2024
- Preceded by: Omar Abdullah
- Constituency: Beerwah

Personal details
- Political party: Jammu & Kashmir National Conference
- Profession: Politician

Shafi Ahmad Wani is an Indian politician from Jammu & Kashmir. He is a Member of the Jammu & Kashmir Legislative Assembly from 2024, representing Beerwah Assembly constituency as a Member of the Jammu & Kashmir National Conference party. Previously he was elected in the 2008 Assembly election from the same constituency as a member of the Jammu and Kashmir Peoples Democratic Party.

== Electoral performance ==
Election	Constituency	Party	Result	Votes %	Opposition Candidate	Opposition Party	Opposition vote %	Ref
2024	Beerwah	JKNC	Won	30.37%	Nazir Ahmad Khan	Independent	24.09%	
2014	Beerwah	JKPDP	Lost	25.30%	Omar Abdullah	JKNC	34.18%	
2008	Beerwah	JKPDP	Won	24.42%	Abdul Majid Matoo	JKNC	24.08%	

== See also ==
- 2024 Jammu & Kashmir Legislative Assembly election
- Jammu and Kashmir Legislative Assembly
