= Raipur Domana =

- census town
- Location in India
- Coordinates: 32.787959°N 74.778525°E
- Country: India
- State: Jammu and Kashmir
- District: Jammu

Population (2011)
  - Total: 20,238

Languages
  - Official: Urdu
- Time zone: UTC+5:30 (IST)

Raipur Domana is a census town in Jammu district in the Indian state of Jammu and Kashmir.It is a suburban area in the vicinity of Jammu city.
