= Shiv Charan Gupta =

Indian politician

Shiv Charan Gupta (born 3 March 1925 in Udhampur, Jammu and Kashmir – died 15 March 2008 Udhampur, Jammu and Kashmir) was an Indian politician and member of the Bharatiya Janata Party. Gupta was a member of the Jammu and Kashmir Legislative Assembly from the Udhampur constituency in Udhampur district.
