= Abdul Ghani Malik (politician) =

Indian politician

Abdul Ghani Malik is an Indian politician and member of the Jammu & Kashmir National Conference. Malik is a member of the Jammu and Kashmir Legislative Assembly from the Gulabgarh constituency in Udhampur district. Malik was elected to the state legislative assembly in 1996 and made hatrick by winning the subsequent elections of 2002 and 2008. He was made a cabinet minister in 2009, in the Omar Abdullah led government, with the portfolios of higher education, labour and employment.

== Electoral performance ==
Election	Constituency	Party	Result	Votes %	Opposition Candidate	Opposition Party	Opposition vote %	Ref
2014	Gulabgarh	JKNC	Lost	28.77%	Haji Mumtaz Ahmad Khan	INC	32.00%	
2008	Gulabgarh	JKNC	Won	31.28%	Haji Mumtaz Ahmad Khan	Independent	24.16%	
2002	Gulabgarh	JKNC	Won	35.15%	Ajaz Ahmad Khan	Independent	26.90%	
1996	Gulabgarh	JD	Won	40.87%	Ajaz Ahmad	JKNC	37.52%	
