= Deldan Namgail =

Indian politician (born 1978)

Deldan Namgail (born 1978) is an Indian politician from Ladakh.

== Early life and education ==
Namgail is from Nubra, Leh district, Jammu and Kashmir. He late father Labzang Rinchen was a farmer. He completed his graduation through correspondence course from the Punjab University in 2003. His wife is a government employee.

== Career ==
Namgail won from Nubra Assembly constituency representing the Indian National Congress in the 2014 Jammu and Kashmir Legislative Assembly election. He polled 3,936 votes and defeated his nearest rival, Tsetan Namgyal of Jammu and Kashmir National Conference, by a margin of 1,618 votes. In 2019, the constituency was abolished after which he ceased to be an MLA.
