= Gool Arnas Assembly constituency =

Constituency of the Jammu and Kashmir legislative assembly in India

Coordinates: 33.19°N 74.83°E

Gool Arnas
- Former constituency for the Jammu and Kashmir Legislative Assembly

Constituency details
- Country: India
- State: Jammu and Kashmir
- District: Reasi
- Established: 1995
- Abolished: 2018

Gool Arnas was a legislative constituency in the Jammu and Kashmir Legislative Assembly of Jammu and Kashmir a north state of India. Gool Arnas was also part of Udhampur Lok Sabha constituency. Gool Arnas was not a constituency until 1995 when it was created by way of delimitation. In fact the Arnas constituency was bifurcated into two parts- Gool Arnas and Gulabgarh.

== Members of the Legislative Assembly ==
| Election | Member | Party |
|---|---|---|
| 1996 | Abdul Wahid Shan | Jammu & Kashmir National Conference |
| 2002 | Ajaz Ahmed Khan | Independent politician |
| 2008 | Ajaz Ahmed Khan | Indian National Congress |
| 2014 | Ajaz Ahmed Khan | Indian National Congress |

== Election results ==
=== Assembly Election 2014 ===
2014 Jammu and Kashmir Legislative Assembly election : Gool Arnas
| Party | Candidate | Votes | % | ±% |
|---|---|---|---|---|
| INC | Ajaz Ahmed Khan | 22,966 | 45.24% | ▲8.19 |
| BJP | Kuldeep Raj Dubey | 16,088 | 31.69% | ▲12.20 |
| JKPDP | Imtiyaz Ahmed Shan | 7,132 | 14.05% | ▲7.07 |
| JKNC | Shamshad Bano | 2,203 | 4.34% | ▼24.51 |
| NOTA | None of the Above | 627 | 1.24% | New |
| Independent | Gulzar Ahmed Wani | 452 | 0.89% | New |
| Independent | Abdul Rehman | 412 | 0.81% | New |
| Independent | Arjun Singh | 393 | 0.77% | New |
| Margin of victory | | 6,878 | 13.55% | ▲5.35 |
| Turnout | | 50,766 | 82.58% | ▲5.88 |
| Registered electors | | 61,476 | | ▲12.04 |
| INC hold | | Swing | ▲8.19 | |

=== Assembly Election 2008 ===
2008 Jammu and Kashmir Legislative Assembly election : Gool Arnas
| Party | Candidate | Votes | % | ±% |
|---|---|---|---|---|
| INC | Ajaz Ahmed Khan | 15,594 | 37.05% | ▲22.29 |
| JKNC | Ghulam Qadir Mughal | 12,142 | 28.85% | ▲14.33 |
| BJP | Kabla Singh | 8,204 | 19.49% | ▲1.42 |
| JKPDP | Shamshad Bano | 2,937 | 6.98% | New |
| JKNPP | Faqir Mohammed | 1,137 | 2.70% | New |
| Independent | Madan Lal | 773 | 1.84% | New |
| BSP | Mohammed Sultan Malik | 657 | 1.56% | ▼1.43 |
| LJP | Shakeel Ahmed | 386 | 0.92% | New |
| ANC | Abdul Majid | 256 | 0.61% | New |
| Margin of victory | | 3,452 | 8.20% | ▼7.09 |
| Turnout | | 42,086 | 76.70% | ▲16.62 |
| Registered electors | | 54,872 | | ▲1.08 |
| INC gain from Independent | | Swing | ▲3.69 | |

=== Assembly Election 2002 ===
2002 Jammu and Kashmir Legislative Assembly election : Gool Arnas
| Party | Candidate | Votes | % | ±% |
|---|---|---|---|---|
| Independent | Ajaz Ahmed Khan | 10,881 | 33.36% | New |
| BJP | Kabala Singh | 5,895 | 18.08% | ▼4.04 |
| INC | Gulzar Ahmed Wani | 4,816 | 14.77% | ▼11.24 |
| JKNC | Abdul Wahid Shan | 4,736 | 14.52% | ▼30.37 |
| Independent | Mohammed Abdullah Bhat | 1,674 | 5.13% | New |
| Independent | Prem Singh | 1,552 | 4.76% | New |
| Independent | Tanveer Ahmad | 1,464 | 4.49% | New |
| BSP | Noor Ahmad | 975 | 2.99% | New |
| Independent | Lachman Singh | 345 | 1.06% | New |
| Independent | Abdul Hamid | 276 | 0.85% | New |
| Margin of victory | | 4,986 | 15.29% | ▼3.59 |
| Turnout | | 32,614 | 60.08% | ▲2.66 |
| Registered electors | | 54,286 | | ▲43.01 |
| Independent gain from JKNC | | Swing | ▼11.52 | |

=== Assembly Election 1996 ===
1996 Jammu and Kashmir Legislative Assembly election : Gool Arnas
| Party | Candidate | Votes | % | ±% |
|---|---|---|---|---|
| JKNC | Abdul Wahid Shan | 9,783 | 44.89% | New |
| INC | Mohammed Ayub Khan | 5,669 | 26.01% | New |
| BJP | Keshib Singh | 4,819 | 22.11% | New |
| JD | Ghulam Rasool Nishat | 1,524 | 6.99% | New |
| Margin of victory | | 4,114 | 18.88% | |
| Turnout | | 21,795 | 58.29% | |
| Registered electors | | 37,959 | | |
| JKNC win (new seat) | | | | |

== See also ==
- Reasi district
