= Mumtaz Ahmed Khan (Jammu and Kashmir politician) =

Mumtaz Ahmad Khan is a Politician from Jammu and Kashmir

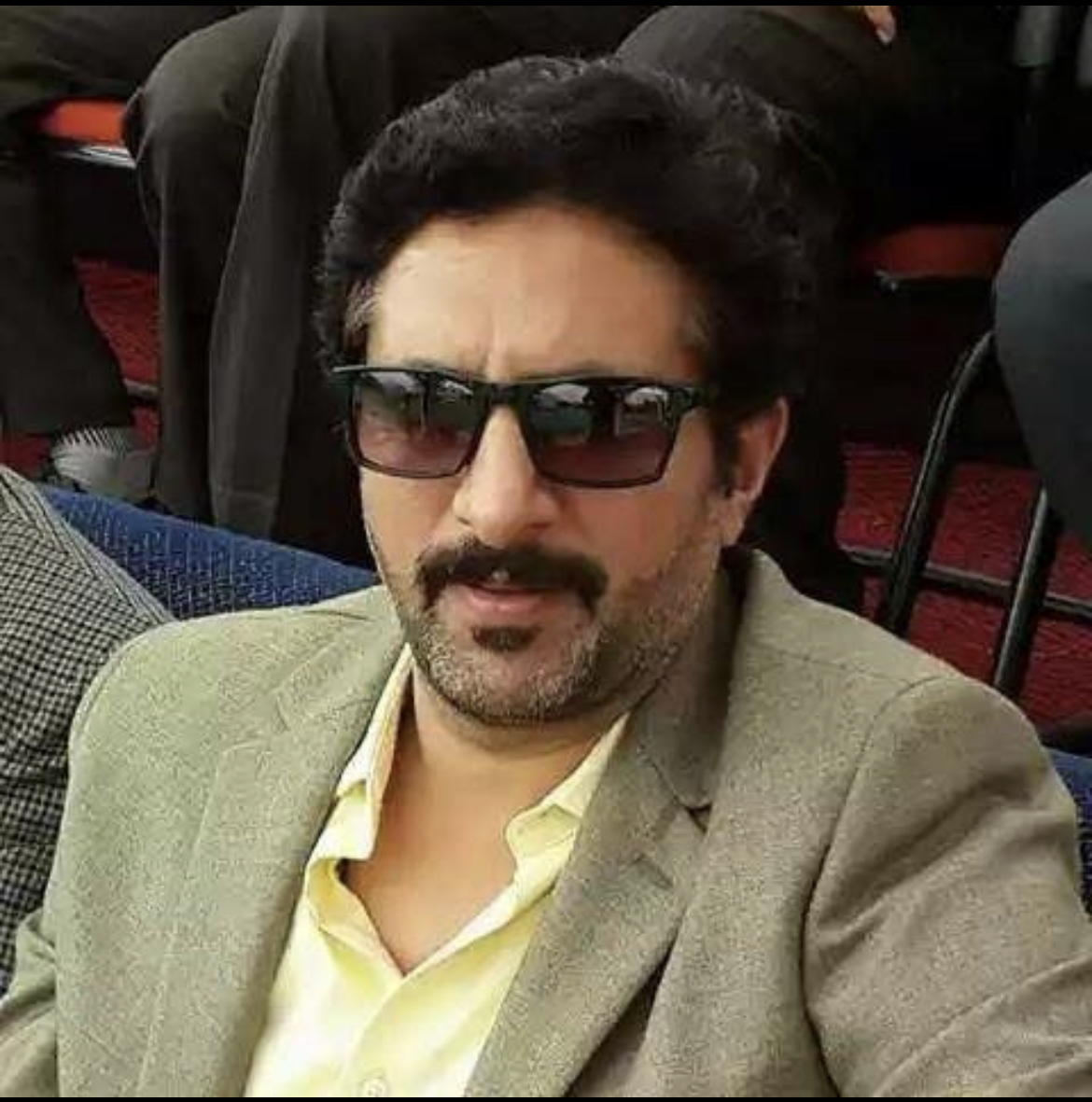
- Khan in function in Reasi
- Constituency: Gulabgarh, Reasi

Personal details
- Born: Dharmari, Reasi, Jammu and Kashmir
- Party: Indian National Congress
- Other political affiliations: Indian National Congress
- Spouse: 1
- Relations: Ajaz Ahmed Khan (Brother), Chowdhary Zulfkar Ali (Brother-in-law)
- Children: 3
- Parent(s): Haji Buland Khan (Father), Shah Begum
- Relatives: Chowdhary Zulfkar Ali (brother-in-law and former cabinet minister), Ajaz Ahmed Khan (brother) (Former cabinet minister)
- Education: BA

Haji Mumtaz Ahmed Khan is Indian Politician and Former Member of 12th Jammu and Kashmir Legislative Assembly. Khan was previously associated with Indian National Congress but left the party in 2021 and joined Jammu and Kashmir Apni Party. Prior to Assembly Elections of Jammu and Kashmir 2024, Khan switched back to Indian National Congress and contested elections from Reasi Assembly Constituency but lost to BJP candidate Kuldeep Raj Dubey by more than 18,000 votes. In 2008 and 2014, Haji Mumtaz contested from Gulabgarh constituency earlier his father was used to contest from Gulabgarh. Khan’s father was Haji Buland Khan, who was a three-time member of the Jammu and Kashmir Legislative Assembly. Mumtaz' elder brother is Ajaz Ahmed Khan who was a former Minister and three-time member of the Jammu and Kashmir Legislative Assembly.

== Electoral performance ==
Election	Constituency	Party	Result	Votes %	Opposition Candidate	Opposition Party	Opposition vote %	Ref
2024	Reasi	INC	Lost	33.37%	Kuldeep Raj Dubey	BJP	63.51%	
2014	Gulabgarh	INC	Won	32.00%	Abdul Ghani Malik	JKNC	28.77%	
2008	Gulabgarh	Independent	Lost	24.16%	Abdul Ghani Malik	JKNC	31.28%	
