= Ajaz Ahmad Khan =

Indian politician

Aijaz Ahmad Khan
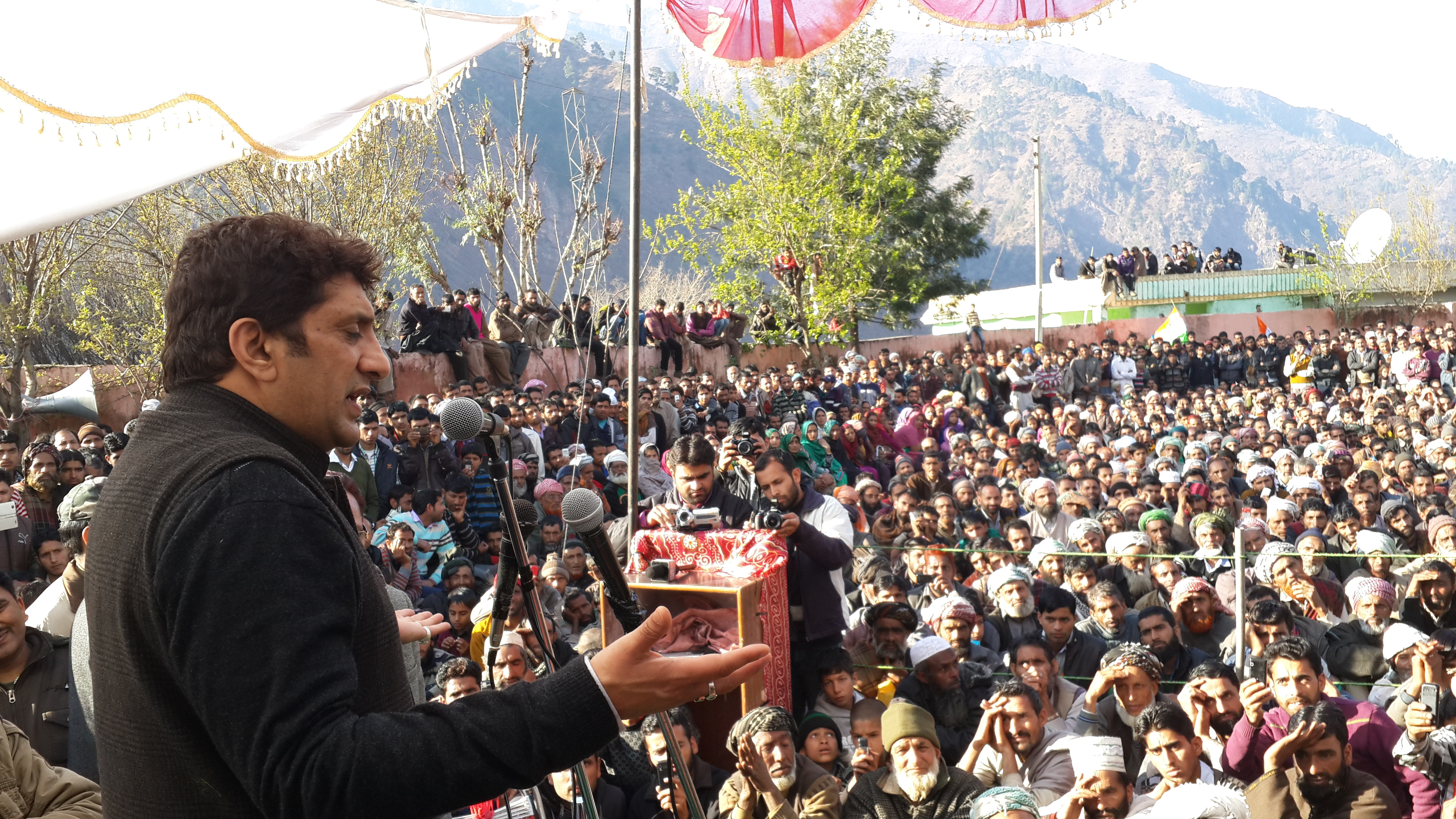
- 2007

Member of the Jammu and Kashmir Legislative Assembly
- In office 2002–2020
- Succeeded by: Constituency abolished
- Constituency: Gool Arnas

Personal details
- Born: 21 November 1968 (age 57) Thuroo, Reasi, Jammu and Kashmir
- Other political affiliations: National Conference (1996-2002) Indian National Congress (2002-2020) Independent (2020-August 2024)
- Spouse: Farhat-un-nisa Khan
- Children: 3
- Parent: Haji Buland Khan
- Relatives: Chowdhary Zulfkar Ali (brother-in-law) (Former cabinet minister), Haji Mumtaz Ahmad Khan (brother) (Ex-MLA GulabGarh)
- Education: BA LLB
- Alma mater: Jammu University
- Awards: Bhartiya Gaurav Award, best citizen of India Award

Aijaz Ahmad Khan, popularly known as Sher-e-Gool Gulabgarh, is an Indian politician and was a member of the 10th, 11th and 12th Jammu and Kashmir Legislative Assembly from Gool Arnas constituency. He served as Minister of various portfolios from 2002 to 2014 in Jammu and Kashmir Govt under the Chief Ministership of Mufti Mohammad Sayeed, Ghulam Nabi Azad and Omar Abdullah. He also served as Deputy Leader of Congress Legislative Party from 2014 to 2018. In Assembly Elections in Jammu and Kashmir 2024, Khan contested elections as Independent candidate from Gulabgarh Assembly constituency in which he got defeated and secured runner-up position.Currently, Ajaz Ahmed Khan is also patron of Gujjar Bakerwal Conference (GBC), a social and political platform, which was founded by his father and veteran leader Haji Buland Khan who established Gujjar Bakerwal Conference in 2000 which has played a crucial role in the upliftment of Gujjar Bakerwal Community.

== Personal life ==
Ajaz Ahmad Khan was born on 21 November 1968 in Thuroo, Dharmari to a renowned veteran leader Haji Buland Khan from Jammu & Kashmir who held various posts in the state government. Ajaz did his early schooling from Govt. High School, Thuroo located at Reasi. He did his B.A. from Jammu University Jammu. In 1996, he completed his LLB from Jammu University. He married Farhat Un Nisa Khan in 2003. His younger brother Haji Mumtaz Ahmad Khan was also a member of 12th Jammu and Kashmir Legislative Assembly from Gulabgarh constituency. His one sister is married to Chowdhary Zulfikar Ali.

== Political career ==
Ajaz joined politics in 1996 soon after completing LLB. In 1996, he contested elections on the ticket of NC from Gulabgarh assembly and got defeated by as margin of 956 votes only. Then he got appointed as District President of NC from Reasi District, i.e. Udhampur II. In 2002, he again contested as an independent candidate from two assembly segments; Gool Arnas and Gulabgarh and he got victory from Gool Arnas. And thus in 2002, he joined Indian National Congress. Then in 2008 and 2014, he got victory from Gool Arnas.

He remained minister since 2002 up to 2014 in the Govt of Mufti Mohammed Sayeed, Ghulam Nabi Azad and Omar Abdullah. He held various departments in the Mufti Mohammed Sayeed, Ghulam Nabi Azad and Omar Abdullah Government. He was such an efficient leader that once he had charge of 13 departments. In 2020, he along with Altaf Bukhari formed a new political party, Jammu and Kashmir Apni Party.

=== Positions held in J&K Government ===
- MoS Finance, Planning and Development, Revenue, Forest, Agriculture, Higher and Technical Education and various other portfolios: 2002
- MoS (Independent) Haj, Auqaf and Fisheries: 2009
- MoS Law and Justice, Parliamentary Affairs, Rural Development and Panchayats, Social Welfare, Animal Husbandry and Hospitality and Protocol: 2009
- MoS (Independent) Revenue, Relief and Rehabilitation: 2013

=== Legislative experience ===
- 2002 – 2008 Member, 10th Legislative Assembly (Gool-Arnas Constituency)
- 2008 – 2014 Member, 11th Legislative Assembly (Gool-Arnas Constituency)
- 2014 – 2018 Member, 12th Legislative Assembly (Gool-Arnas Constituency)
- Chairman of Joint Commission Land Conservation of J&K Assembly
- Chairman of Subordinate Legislation of J&K Assembly
- Member of Ethics Committee of J&K Assembly
- Member of Committee on Joint Heritage Preservation of J&K Assembly
- Member of Public Accounts Committee for three times of J&K Assembly

=== Awards and honors ===
- Rashtriya Gourav Award
- Best citizen of India Award

== Social Work ==
Ajaz Ahmed Khan is also patron of Gujjar Bakerwal Conference (GBC), a social and political platform which was founded by his father and veteran leader Haji Buland Khan who established Gujjar Bakerwal Conference in 2000 which has played a crucial role in the upliftment of Gujjar Bakerwal Community.
