= Qamar Ali Akhoon =

Indian politician from Jammu and Kashmir (1957–2026)

MLA
- In office 1996–2002, 2002–2003, 2008–2014
- Constituency: Kargil

Personal details
- Born: 15 August 1957 Sangra, Kargil district, Ladakh, India
- Died: 13 February 2026 (aged 68)
- Party: JKNC

Qamar Ali Akhoon (15 August 1957 – 13 February 2026) was an Indian politician from Jammu and Kashmir. He was a senior member of the Jammu & Kashmir National Conference.

In 1996, he was elected from Kargil district's Kargil assembly constituency of Jammu and Kashmir.

== Life and career ==
Qamar Ali Akhoon was born into a religious family 'Akhoonpa' in village Sangra which is about 48 km from Kargil town on 15 August 1957. He received his primary education from tSangrah and did his matriculation from Sankoo High School in the year 1973. He lost his parents when he was in Primary School; thereafter his elder brother Talib Hussain and Ali Asgar mir baroo took the responsibility on his shoulders to support his family and to educate Akhoon and his younger brother Mohd Jaffer Akhoon. A renowned religious scholar of Suru Valley, the Late Agha Syed Haider Rizvi assisted in sending him to Srinagar for higher studies. After completing his graduation, Akhoon pursued LLB (Honours) instead of applying for a job. Later, he entered politics. He was one of the most senior JKNC leaders from the district.

On 11 June 2014, he was appointed the Adviser to the Chief Minister J&K, in the capacity of a Cabinet Minister and a sitting Legislature representing 49-Kargil Constituency. He was also the first Chief Executive Councillor/Chairman of the newly formed Ladakh Autonomous Hill Development Council Kargil in 2002. Earlier, he had served as the Minister for Consumer Affairs & Public Distribution and Transport under Mr Omar Abdullah and Minister of State for Works and Power during the Farooq Abdullah regime, and he was the first Chief Executive Councillor of Ladakh Autonomous Hill Development Council Kargil as well.

Akhoon died on 13 February 2026, at the age of 68.
