= 2014 Jammu and Kashmir Legislative Assembly election =

State assembly election in India

2014 Jammu and Kashmir state assembly elections
- 25 November to 20 December 2014

All 87 seats in Legislative Assembly 44 seats needed for a majority
- Registered: 7,316,946
- Turnout: 65.91% (▲4.75%)
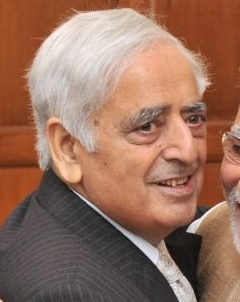

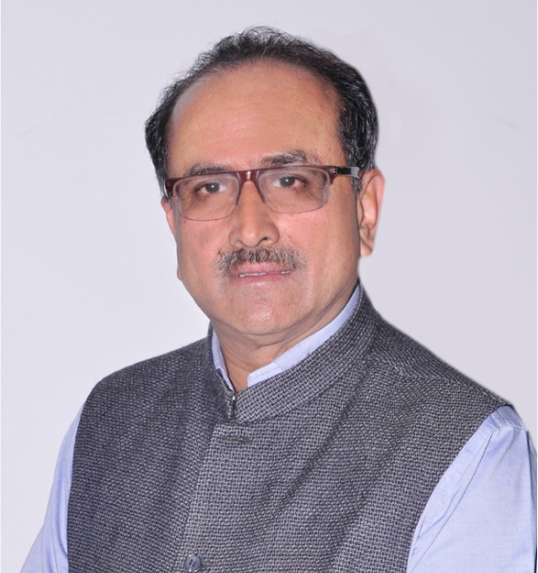

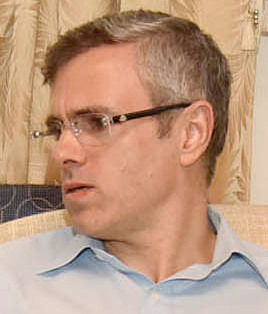

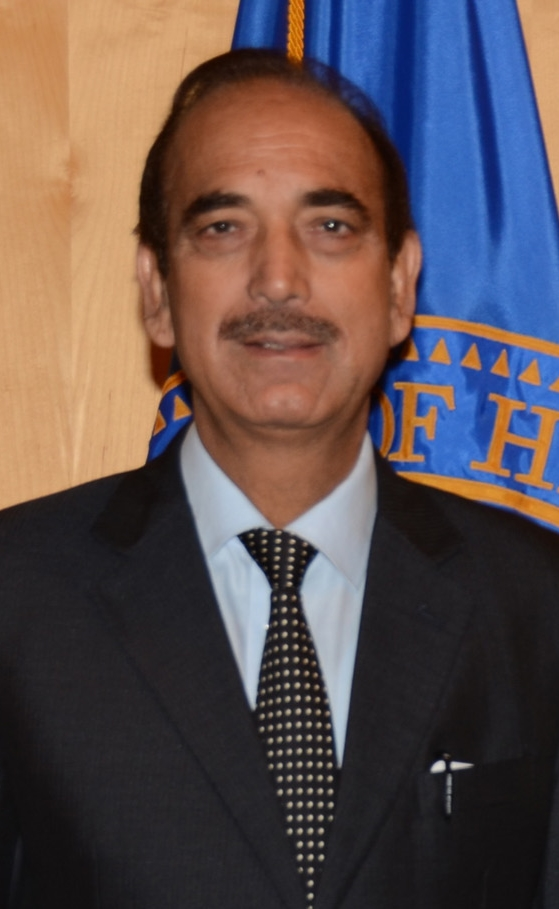
	Majority party	Minority party
Leader	Mufti Mohammad Sayeed	Nirmal Kumar Singh
Party	JKPDP	BJP
Leader's seat	Anantnag (won)	Billawar (won)
Last election	21	11
Seats won	28	25
Seat change	▲7	▲14
Popular vote	10,92,203	11,07,194
Percentage	22.67%	22.98%
Swing	▲7.31 pp	▲10.55 pp
	Third party	Fourth party
Leader	Omar Abdullah	Ghulam Nabi Azad
Party	JKNC	INC
Leader's seat	Beerwah (won), Sonawar (lost)	Did not contest
Last election	28	17
Seats won	15	12
Seat change	▼13	▼5
Popular vote	10,00,693	8,67,883
Percentage	20.77%	18.01%
Swing	▼2.27 pp	▲0.29 pp
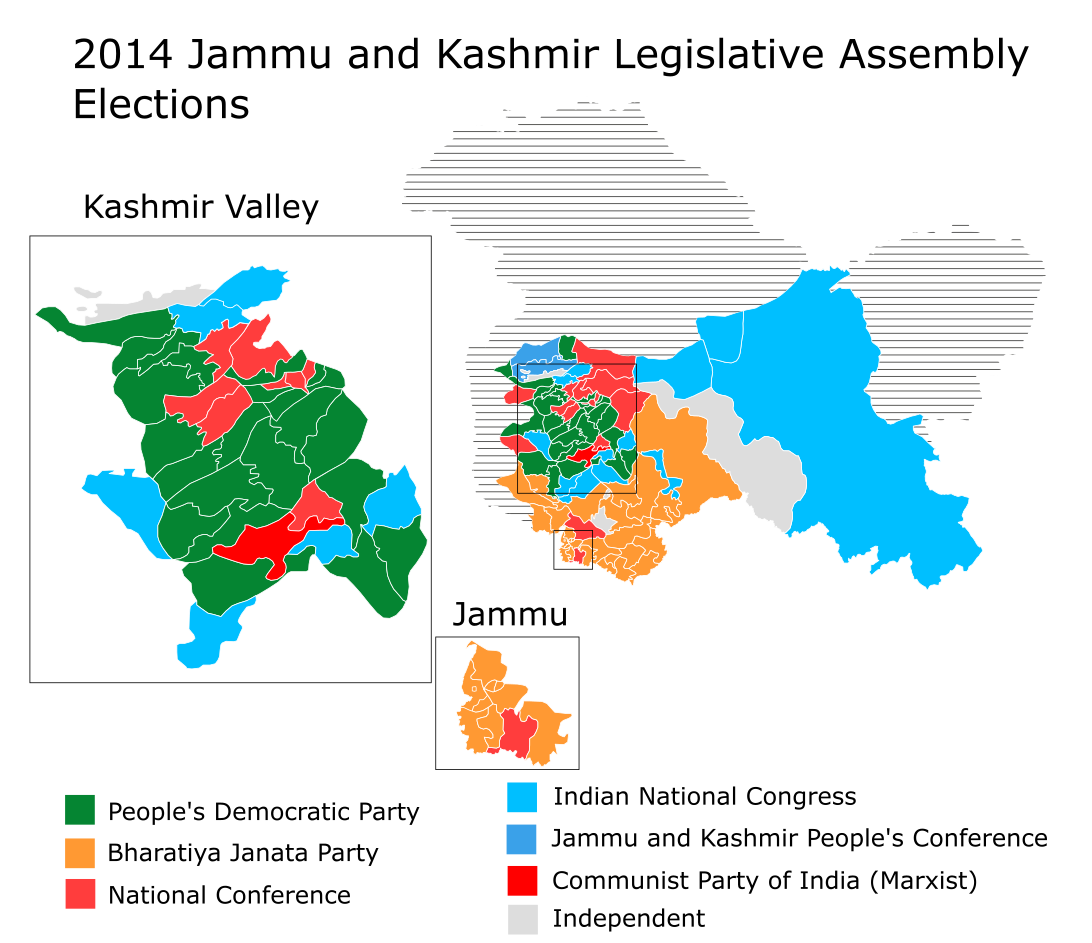
Chief Minister before election
Omar Abdullah
JKNC
(in coalition with the INC)
Elected Chief Minister
Mufti Mohammad Sayeed
PDP
(in coalition with the BJP)

The 2014 Jammu and Kashmir Legislative Assembly election was held in the Indian state of Jammu and Kashmir in five phases from 25 November – 20 December 2014. Voters elected 87 members to the Jammu and Kashmir Legislative Assembly. The results were declared on 23 December 2014. Voter-verified paper audit trail (VVPAT) along with EVMs were used in 3 assembly seats out of 87 in Jammu Kashmir elections. Following the election, the Jammu & Kashmir People's Democratic Party (PDP) formed a coalition government with the BJP and their leader, Mufti Mohammad Sayeed became the state's Chief minister. BJP leader Nirmal Kumar Singh became the deputy chief minister.

This was the last assembly election before the territory's special status was revoked and Ladakh separated as union territory in 2019.

== Parties ==
Party	Flag	Electoral symbol	Leader	Seats contested
Indian National Congress			Ghulam Nabi Azad	86
Jammu & Kashmir National Conference			Farooq Abdulla	85
Jammu & Kashmir Peoples Democratic Party			Mufti Mohammed Sayeed	84
Bharatiya Janata Party			Nirmal Kumar Singh	75

== Background and campaign ==
Before the election, Indian National Congress broke its alliance with Jammu and Kashmir National Conference and contested on all seats in the assembly.

Campaigning before the elections were aggressive and robust. Following the huge victory of Bharatiya Janata Party in the Indian parliamentary election, the BJP turned its attention towards J&K and campaigned on the promise of 'development'. This included a visit from the Prime Minister of India, Narendra Modi in support of the local BJP campaign.

== Boycott Calls ==
- Hardline separatist All Parties Hurriyat Conference leader Syed Ali Shah Geelani had appealed to people of Kashmir to boycott the 2014 Jammu and Kashmir Legislative Assembly elections completely, arguing that "India has been holding elections in the Valley using the power of the gun and so such an exercise is not legitimate." He added, "My appeal to the youth, in particular, is that the sacrifices rendered by the people must be safeguarded and, hence, in no way should vote during elections."
- Separatists were propagating the poll boycott campaign through video clips on social networking sites and applications, including Facebook and WhatsApp.
- A four-minute video clip has gone viral on social sites with messages of chairmen of both hardline and moderate factions of Hurriyat Conference and Dukhtaran-e-Millat chief Asiya Andrabi. The video message sent through WhatsApp and shared on Facebook and Twitter asked the people to boycott the coming polls.
- Video also showed Hurriyat hawk Syed Ali Shah Geelani addressing a gathering via phone urging youth not to undermine the mission of 'martyrs'. Moderate Hurriyat chairman Mirwaiz Umar Farooq is seen posing for the camera with the appeal that polls must be boycotted 'en masse'.

Despite these calls, voter turnout in the 2014 elections instead increased by 4%, from roughly 61% in the previous election to 65%.

== Voting ==
The polls were carried out in five phases. Despite several boycott calls by hurriyat leaders, elections recorded highest voters turnout in last 25 years. Voters turnout was more than 65% which is higher than usual voting percentage in other states of India.

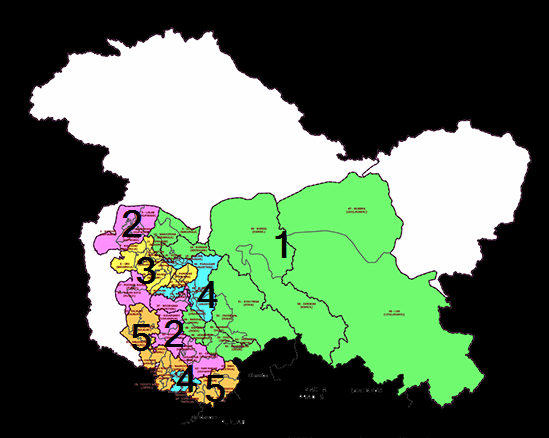
Voting stages

Date	Seats	Turnout
Tuesday 25 November	15	71.28
Tuesday 2 December	18	71.00
Tuesday 9 December	16	58.89
Sunday 14 December	18	49.00
Saturday 20 December	20	76.00
Total	87	65.23

The European Parliament, on the behalf of European Union, welcomed the smooth conduct of the State Legislative Elections in the Jammu and Kashmir. The EU in its message said that, "The high voter turnout figure proves that democracy is firmly rooted in India. The EU would like to congratulate India and its democratic system for conduct of fair elections, unmarred by violence, in the state of Jammu and Kashmir". The European Parliament also takes cognizance of the fact that a large number of Kashmiri voters turned out despite calls for the boycott of elections by certain separatist forces. However, elected Jammu and Kashmir Chief Minister Mufti Muhammad Sayeed said, "If God forbid the Hurriyat and the militants tried to disrupt the elections there would not have been as participative as they had been. They (Pakistan) also allowed these elections to take place." Ruling Party president Mehbooba Mufti also defended Mufti's remarks. While taking a dig at Mufti's statement former Chief minister of Jammu and Kashmir and leader of opposition in Rajya Sabha Ghulam Nabi Azad said that, "In fact, Pakistan and militant groups tried their best to destabilize the democratic process in the state."

== Results ==
Results
Party	Popular vote			Seats		
Party	Votes	%	±pp	Contested	Won	+/−
Jammu and Kashmir People's Democratic Party	10,92,203	22.67	▲7.31	84	28	▲7
Bharatiya Janata Party	11,07,194	22.98	▲10.55	75	25	▲14
Jammu & Kashmir National Conference	10,00,693	20.77	▼2.27	85	15	▼13
Indian National Congress	8,67,883	18.01	▲0.29	86	12	▼5
Jammu & Kashmir People's Conference	93,182	1.93	▲1.93	26	2	▲2
Communist Party of India (Marxist)	24,017	0.50	▼0.30	3	1	–
Jammu & Kashmir National Panthers Party	95,941	1.99	▼1.40	60	0	▼3
Independents	3,29,881	6.85	▼9.49	274	3	▼1
Others	1,57,858	3.28	▼2.59	138	1	▼1
NOTA	49,129	1.02	▲1.02	87		
Total	48,17,981	100				
Valid votes	48,17,981	99.90				
Invalid votes	4,795	0.10				
Votes cast/ turnout	48,22,776	65.91				
Abstentions	24,94,170	34.09				
Registered voters	73,16,946					

=== Result by Division ===
District	Seats					
District	Seats	BJP	NC	PDP	INC	OTH
Kashmir	46	—N/a	12	25	4	5
Ladakh	4	—N/a	—N/a	—N/a	3	1
Jammu	37	25	3	3	5	1
Total	87	25	15	28	12	7

=== Result by Division (Vote Share) ===
Division				
Division	BJP	NC	PDP	INC
Kashmir	2.24	29.20	37.43	12.76
Ladakh	22.14	8.10	11.77	50.72
Jammu	40.15	14.39	10.99	20.84
Total	22.98	20.77	22.67	18.01

Note: All figures used here are expressed as percentages (%).

=== Results by District ===
Division	District	Seats					
Division	District	Seats	BJP	NC	PDP	INC	OTH
Kashmir	Kupwara	5	—N/a	—N/a	2	—N/a	3
Kashmir	Baramulla	7	—N/a	1	5	1	—N/a
Kashmir	Bandipora	3	—N/a	2	—N/a	1	—N/a
Kashmir	Ganderbal	2	—N/a	2	—N/a	—N/a	—N/a
Kashmir	Srinagar	8	—N/a	3	5	—N/a	—N/a
Kashmir	Budgam	5	—N/a	2	2	—N/a	1
Kashmir	Pulwama	4	—N/a	—N/a	4	—N/a	—N/a
Kashmir	Shopian	2	—N/a	—N/a	2	—N/a	—N/a
Kashmir	Kulgam	4	—N/a	1	1	1	1
Kashmir	Anantnag	6	—N/a	1	4	1	—N/a
Ladakh	Leh	2	—N/a	—N/a	—N/a	2	—N/a
Ladakh	Kargil	2	—N/a	—N/a	—N/a	1	1
Jammu	Kishtwar	2	1	—N/a	—N/a	1	—N/a
Jammu	Doda	2	2	—N/a	—N/a	—N/a	—N/a
Jammu	Ramban	2	1	—N/a	—N/a	1	—N/a
Jammu	Reasi	3	1	—N/a	—N/a	2	—N/a
Jammu	Udhampur	3	2	—N/a	—N/a	—N/a	1
Jammu	Kathua	5	5	—N/a	—N/a	—N/a	—N/a
Jammu	Samba	2	2	—N/a	—N/a	—N/a	—N/a
Jammu	Jammu	11	9	2	—N/a	—N/a	—N/a
Jammu	Rajouri	4	2	—N/a	2	—N/a	—N/a
Jammu	Poonch	3	—N/a	1	1	1	—N/a
Total		87	25	15	28	12	7

=== Results by Constituency ===
District	Constituency		Winner				Runner Up				Margin	%
District	#	Name (Note: SC indicate constituencies reserved for Scheduled Castes.)	Candidate	Party	Votes	%	Candidate	Party	Votes	%	Margin	%
Kupwara	1	Karnah	Raja Manzoor Ahmad	JKPDP	12,371	47.75	Kifil Ur Rehman Khan	JKNC	6,596	25.46	5,775	22.29
Kupwara	2	Kupwara	Bashir Ahmad Dar	JKPC	24,754	34.47	Mir Mohd Fayaz	JKPDP	24,603	34.26	151	0.21
Kupwara	3	Lolab	Abdul Haq Khan	JKPDP	29,408	41.06	Qaysar Jamshaid Lone	JKNC	26,538	37.06	2,870	4.00
Kupwara	4	Handwara	Sajjad Gani Lone	JKPC	29,355	43.19	Ch. Mohd. Ramzan	JKNC	23,932	35.21	5,423	7.98
Kupwara	5	Langate	Sheikh Abdul Rashid	IND	18,172	35.49	Ghulam Nabi Ganai	JKPDP	15,667	30.60	2,505	4.89
Baramulla	6	Uri	Md. Shafi	JKNC	24,359	39.25	Aijaz Ali Khan	JKPDP	18,567	29.92	5,792	9.33
Baramulla	7	Rafiabad	Yawar Ahmad Mir	JKPDP	17,918	32.31	Abdul Gani Vakil	INC	15,584	28.10	2,334	4.21
Baramulla	8	Sopore	Abdul Rashid Dar	INC	8,429	26.38	Nazir Ahmad Naikoo	JKPDP	5,674	17.76	2,755	8.62
Bandipora	9	Gurez	Nazir Ahmad Khan	JKNC	6,664	48.29	Faqir Mohmad Khan	INC	6,523	47.26	141	1.03
Bandipora	10	Bandipora	Usman Abdul Majid	INC	25,084	37.69	Nizamuddin Bhat	JKPDP	21,341	32.06	3,743	5.63
Bandipora	11	Sonawari	Md. Akbar Lone	JKNC	32,567	40.53	Yasir Reshi	JKPDP	32,161	40.02	406	0.51
Baramulla	12	Sangrama	Basharat Ah. Bukhari	JKPDP	12,146	31.37	Shuib Nabi Lone	INC	10,392	26.84	1,754	4.53
Baramulla	13	Baramulla	Javid Hassan Baig	JKPDP	14,418	43.75	Gh. Hassan Rahi	JKNC	7,401	22.46	7,017	21.29
Baramulla	14	Gulmarg	Mohd. Abass Wani	JKPDP	22,957	33.81	Ghulam Hassan Mir	JKDPN (Note: Jammu and Kashmir Democratic Party Nationalist)	20,146	29.67	2,811	4.14
Baramulla	15	Pattan	Imran Reza Ansari	JKPDP	21,218	40.41	Aga Syed Al Mosavi	JKNC	11,884	22.63	9,334	17.78
Ganderbal	16	Kangan	Altaf Ahmad	JKNC	25,812	47.12	Bashir Ahmad Mir	JKPDP	24,380	44.50	1,432	2.62
Ganderbal	17	Ganderbal	Ishfaq Ahmad Sk.	JKNC	19,478	36.38	Qazi Md. Afzal	JKPDP	18,881	35.27	597	1.11
Srinagar	18	Hazratbal	Asiya Naqash	JKPDP	13,234	44.87	Mohd. Syed Akhoon	JKNC	9,834	33.34	3,400	11.53
Srinagar	19	Zadibal	Abid Hussain Ansari	JKPDP	7,852	42.66	Peer Afaq Ahmad	JKNC	4,849	26.35	3,003	16.31
Srinagar	20	Eidgah	Mubarak Gul	JKNC	6,766	41.38	Ali Mohammad Wani	JKPDP	6,158	37.66	608	3.72
Srinagar	21	Khanyar	Ali Md. Sagar	JKNC	6,505	48.76	Md. Khurshid Alam	JKPDP	5,338	40.01	1,167	8.75
Srinagar	22	Habba Kadal	Shamim Firdous	JKNC	4,955	42.40	Moti Koul	BJP	2,596	22.21	2,359	20.19
Srinagar	23	Amira Kadal	Altaf Bukhari	JKPDP	11,726	54.57	Nasir Aslam Wani	JKNC	6,385	29.71	5,341	24.86
Srinagar	24	Sonawar	Md. Ashraf Mir	JKPDP	14,283	41.88	Omar Abdullah	JKNC	9,500	27.85	4,783	14.03
Srinagar	25	Batmaloo	Noor Mohd Sheikh	JKPDP	12,542	42.56	Mohd Irfan Shah	JKNC	8,215	27.88	4,327	14.68
Budgam	26	Chadoora	Javaid Mustafa Mir	JKPDP	25,770	48.26	Ali Md. Dar	JKNC	24,077	45.09	1,693	3.17
Budgam	27	Budgam	Aga Syed Ruhullah	JKNC	30,090	43.76	Gh. Moinuddin Bhat	JKPDP	27,303	39.71	2,787	4.05
Budgam	28	Beerwah	Omar Abdullah	JKNC	23,717	34.18	Nazir Ahmad Khan	INC	22,807	32.86	910	1.32
Budgam	29	Khan Sahib	Hakeem Yasin	JKPDF	26,649	38.16	Saif Ud Din Bhat	JKPDP	25,540	36.58	1,109	1.58
Budgam	30	Chrar-I-Sharief	Ghulam Nabi Lone	JKPDP	32,849	50.85	Ab. Rahim Rather	JKNC	27,682	42.85	5,167	8.00
Pulwama	31	Tral	Mushtaq Ahmad Shah	JKPDP	12,415	38.56	Mohd. Ashraf Bhat	JKNC	8,305	25.80	4,110	12.76
Pulwama	32	Pampore	Zahoor Ahmad Mir	JKPDP	16,239	44.38	Yawar Ali Abass Masoodi	JKNC	12,741	34.82	3,498	9.56
Pulwama	33	Pulwama	Mohd. Khalil Band	JKPDP	11,631	38.55	Ghulam Nabi Ratanpuri	JKNC	10,599	35.13	1,032	3.42
Pulwama	34	Rajpora	Haseeb Drabu	JKPDP	18,103	36.95	Ghulam Mohiuddin Mir	JKNC	13,830	28.23	4,273	8.72
Shopian	35	Wachi	Aijaz Ahmad Mir	JKPDP	15,610	42.47	Showkat Hussain Ganie	JKNC	13,805	37.56	1,805	4.91
Shopian	36	Shopian	Md. Yousuf Bhat	JKPDP	14,262	34.20	Shabir Ahmad Kullay	IND	11,896	28.52	2,366	5.68
Kulgam	37	Noorabad	Ab. Majid Padder	JKPDP	28,698	48.36	Sakina Itoo	JKNC	24,990	42.11	3,708	6.25
Kulgam	38	Kulgam	Md. Yousuf Tarigami	CPI(M)	20,574	38.69	Nazir Ahmad Laway	JKPDP	20,240	38.06	334	0.63
Kulgam	39	Hom Shali Bugh	Ab. Majeed	JKNC	11,406	40.00	Abdul Gaffar Sofi	JKPDP	10,137	35.55	1,269	4.45
Anantnag	40	Anantnag	Mufti Md. Sayeed	JKPDP	16,983	51.20	Hilal Ahmad Shah	INC	10,955	33.03	6,028	18.17
Kulgam	41	Devsar	Md. Amin Bhat	INC	20,162	35.08	Md. Sartaj Madni	JKPDP	18,651	32.45	1,511	2.63
Anantnag	42	Dooru	Farooq Ahmad Andrabi	JKPDP	18,150	37.58	Ghulam Ahmad Mir	INC	17,989	37.24	161	0.34
Anantnag	43	Kokernag	Ab. Rahim Rather	JKPDP	24,284	42.30	Peerzada Md. Syed	INC	19,713	34.33	4,571	7.97
Anantnag	44	Shangus	Gulzar Ahmad Wani	INC	21,085	37.08	Peerzada M. Hussain	JKPDP	18,896	33.23	2,189	3.85
Anantnag	45	Bijbehara	Abdul Rehman Veeri	JKPDP	23,581	48.79	Bashir Ahmad Shah	JKNC	20,713	42.85	2,868	5.94
Anantnag	46	Pahalgam	Altaf Ahmad Wani	JKNC	25,232	44.67	Rafi Ahmad Mir	JKPDP	24,328	43.07	904	1.60
Leh	47	Nubra	Deldan Namgail	INC	3,936	38.00	Tsetan Namgyal	JKNC	2,318	22.38	1,618	15.62
Leh	48	Leh	Nawang Rigzin Jora	INC	27,585	57.28	Chering Dorjay	BJP	19,909	41.34	7,676	15.94
Kargil	49	Kargil	Asgar Ali Karbalai	INC	22,911	50.51	Anayat Ali	JKPDP	12,406	27.35	10,505	23.16
Kargil	50	Zanskar	Syed Md. Baqir Rizvi	IND	6,763	43.19	Ghulam Raza	INC	6,197	39.58	566	3.61
Kishtwar	51	Kishtwar	Sunil Kumar Sharma	BJP	28,054	45.37	Sajjad Ahmad Kichloo	JKNC	25,202	40.76	2,852	4.61
Kishtwar	52	Inderwal	Ghulam Md. Saroori	INC	29,754	46.93	Tariq Hussain Keen	BJP	17,384	27.42	12,370	19.51
Doda	53	Doda	Shakti Raj Parihar	BJP	24,572	36.63	Abdul Majid Wani	INC	20,532	30.61	4,040	6.02
Doda	54	Bhaderwah	Daleep Singh Parihar	BJP	25,953	35.33	Mohd Sharief Niaz	INC	24,457	33.29	1,496	2.04
Ramban	55	Ramban (SC)	Neelam Kumar Langeh	BJP	25,349	42.30	Dr. Chaman Lal	JKNC	19,985	33.35	5,364	8.95
Ramban	56	Banihal	Vikar Rasool Wani	INC	17,671	30.65	Bashir Ahmed Runyal	JKPDP	13,322	23.10	4,349	7.55
Reasi	57	Gulab Garh	Mumtaz Ahmed	INC	17,964	32.00	Ab. Ghani Malik	JKNC	16,148	28.77	1,816	3.23
Reasi	58	Reasi	Ajay Nanda	BJP	22,017	25.26	Saraf Singh	IND	20,130	23.09	1,887	2.17
Reasi	59	Gool Arnas	Ajaz Ahmad Khan	INC	22,966	45.24	Kuldeep Raj Dubey	BJP	16,088	31.69	6,878	13.55
Udhampur	60	Udhampur	Pawan Kumar Gupta	IND	36,226	42.57	Balwant Singh Mankotia	JKNPP	21,576	25.36	14,650	17.21
Udhampur	61	Chenani (SC)	Dina Nath Bhagat	BJP	33,047	50.17	Krishan Chander	INC	12,715	19.30	20,332	30.87
Udhampur	62	Ram Nagar	Ranbir Singh Pathania	BJP	45,891	55.71	Harsh Dev Singh	JKNPP	28,471	34.56	17,420	21.15
Kathua	63	Bani	Jewan Lal	BJP	12,841	39.14	Ghulam Hyder Malik	JKNC	8,429	25.69	4,412	13.45
Kathua	64	Basohli	Lal Singh	BJP	29,808	53.07	Davinder Singh	JKNC	12,007	21.38	17,801	31.69
Kathua	65	Kathua	Rajiv Jasrotia	BJP	35,670	39.11	Som Raj Majotra	BSP	28,864	31.65	6,806	7.46
Kathua	66	Billawar	Nirmal Kumar Singh	BJP	43,447	58.30	Manohar Lal Sharma	INC	25,472	34.18	17,975	24.12
Kathua	67	Hira Nagar (SC)	Kuldeep Raj	BJP	55,399	69.15	Girdhari Lal Chalotra	INC	16,115	20.11	39,284	49.04
Samba	68	Samba (SC)	Devinder Kumar Manyal	BJP	34,075	53.08	Yash Paul Kundal	JKNPP	11,957	18.63	22,118	34.45
Samba	69	Vijay Pur	Chander Prakash	BJP	38,607	43.45	Surjeet Slathia	JKNC	26,435	29.75	12,172	13.70
Jammu	70	Nagrota	Devender Singh Rana	JKNC	23,678	39.03	Nand Kishore	BJP	19,630	32.35	4,048	6.68
Jammu	71	Gandhi Nagar	Kavinder Gupta	BJP	56,679	51.17	Raman Bhalla	INC	39,902	36.02	16,777	15.15
Jammu	72	Jammu East	Rajesh Gupta	BJP	21,776	61.69	Vikram Malhotra	INC	9,082	25.73	12,694	35.96
Jammu	73	Jammu West	Sat Paul Sharma	BJP	69,626	70.63	Surinder Singh Shingari	INC	18,997	19.27	50,629	51.36
Jammu	74	Bishnah	Kamal Verma	JKNC	29,380	41.62	Ashwani Sharma	BJP	26,394	37.39	2,986	4.23
Jammu	75	Ranbir Singh Pura (SC)	Gagan Bhagat	BJP	25,696	41.65	Bushan Lal	JKPDP	12,086	19.59	13,610	22.06
Jammu	76	Suchet Garh	Sham Lal Choudhary	BJP	19,971	38.82	Taranjit Singh Toni	JKNC	10,554	20.51	9,417	18.31
Jammu	77	Marh	Sukh Nandan Kumar	BJP	25,396	42.35	Ajay Sadhotra	JKNC	13,784	22.99	11,612	19.36
Jammu	78	Raipur Domana (SC)	Bali Bhagat	BJP	49,134	66.99	Mula Ram	INC	16,991	23.17	32,143	43.82
Jammu	79	Akhnoor	Rajeev Sharma	BJP	41,901	53.19	Sham Lal Sharma	INC	32,521	41.29	9,380	11.90
Jammu	80	Chhamb (SC)	Kirshan Lal	BJP	36,033	60.53	Tara Chand	INC	21,243	35.69	14,790	24.84
Rajouri	81	Nowshera	Ravinder Raina	BJP	37,374	49.51	Surinder Choudhary	JKPDP	27,871	36.92	9,503	12.59
Rajouri	82	Darhal	Ch. Zulfkar Ali	JKPDP	24,381	31.58	Ch. Liaqat Ali	JKNC	19,313	25.01	5,068	6.57
Rajouri	83	Rajouri	Qamar Hussain	JKPDP	26,954	30.63	Ch. Talib Hussain	BJP	24,464	27.80	2,490	2.83
Rajouri	84	Kala Kote	Abdul Ghani Kohli	BJP	25,225	38.13	Rachhpal Singh	JKNC	19,047	28.79	6,178	9.34
Poonch	85	Surankote	Ch. Mohd Akram	INC	30,584	46.45	Mushtaq Ahmad Shah	JKNC	22,520	34.20	8,064	12.25
Poonch	86	Mendhar	Javed Ahmed Rana	JKNC	31,186	47.75	Mohd Mahroof Khan	JKPDP	22,161	33.93	9,025	13.82
Poonch	87	Poonch Haveli	Shah Mohd. Tantray	JKPDP	19,488	25.57	Ajaz Ahmed Jan	JKNC	15,976	20.96	3,512	4.61

== Government formation ==
Three days after the results, the JKNC approached the BJP for a meeting to try and form a government. As part of the deal, Nirmal Kumar Singh was to be the chief minister and JKNC's MLA Ali Mohammad Sagar was to be his deputy. The deal fell through after a revolt in the JKNC. The BJP also rejected this deal, citing morality issues.

In the following days, the JKNC also announced its intention to support the PDP from outside by submitting a letter to the governor Narinder Nath Vohra after the dialogue with the BJP fell through. The PDP refused.

A week after the results, the PDP and the BJP officially started talks. Both parties had a two-member team to form a Common Minimum Programme (CMP). The PDP was represented by Naeem Akhtar and Haseeb Drabu, while Ram Madhav and Nirmal Kumar Singh represented the BJP. Minister of State in the PMO, Jitendra Singh, supervised the dialogue.

Omar Abdullah resigned as chief minister on 24 December. The Governor Narinder Nath Vohra accepted his resignation but asked him to continue in an interim capacity until the formation of a new government. President's rule was imposed on 1 January 2015.

After dealing with issues, both parties turned their attention to the composition of the cabinet. The PDP was initially reluctant for a three-year rotation of the chief minister's post but later agreed. There were also issues related to the joining of the government by separatist-turned-politician Sajjad Lone. In the run-up to the election, he met Prime Minister Narendra Modi and praised him by calling him "big brother." The BJP reciprocated by not running a candidate against Lone for the Handwara seat, from where he won, and got elected to the assembly for the first time.

Both parties announced on 25 February that the CMP was almost ready, in a joint press conference called by BJP national President Amit Shah and PDP President Mehbooba Mufti. They also stated that the ideological differences had been "ironed out" and both parties were now working on the formation of a cabinet. The dialogue between both parties ended successfully on 18 February - two months and 5 days after the beginning of talks.

The new PDP-BJP government took the oath of office on 1 March in the Zorawar Singh Stadium of Jammu, with Mufti Mohammad Sayeed as chief minister for the full term of six years and Nirmal Kumar Singh as his deputy. Modi was also present for the occasion. Twelve cabinet ministers from each party were also sworn in. This was the first time that the BJP was a coalition partner in the Jammu and Kashmir government. Lone and independent MLA for Udhampur, Pawan Kumar Gupta, were also sworn in as cabinet ministers from the BJP's quota.

The CMP was then released in a press conference. The CMP gave a vision of the "all-around development of Jammu and Kashmir" and "Sabka Saath, Sabka Vikas" (with everyone, everyone's development). Contentious issues like Article 370 and AFSPA would be referred to a high-power committee, with representation from both parties and civil society. The PDP also agreed to join the NDA's central, with Mehbooba Mufti's induction into the union cabinet, at a later date, and also support the Modi government in both houses of parliament.

== See also ==
- Elections in Jammu and Kashmir
- Jammu and Kashmir Legislative Assembly
- Indian Armed Forces and the 2014 Jammu and Kashmir floods
- 2014 Kashmir Valley attacks
- 2014 elections in India
- 2024 Jammu and Kashmir Legislative Assembly election
