= Kamal Verma =

Indian politician

Kamal Verma (born 1956) is an Indian politician from Jammu and Kashmir. He is a former member of the Jammu and Kashmir Legislative Assembly from the Bishnah Assembly constituency in Jammu district representing Jammu and Kashmir National Conference.

== Early life ==
Verma is from Bishnah, Jammu district, Jammu and Kashmir. He is the son of the late Om Prakash. He studied up to Class 10 at JKS Bose school. He is a pharmacist and his wife runs her own business. He declared assets worth Rs. 6 lakhs in 2008 and Rs.1 crore in 2014, in his affidavits to the Election Commission of India.

== Career ==
Verma won the Bishnah Assembly constituency in the 2014 Jammu and Kashmir Legislative Assembly election representing the Jammu and Kashmir National Conference. He polled 29,380 votes and defeated his nearest rival, Ashwani Sharma of the Bharatiya Janata Party, by 2,986 votes. Verma first entered electoral politics in 1996 and contested the Bishnah seat as an independent candidate in the 1996 Jammu and Kashmir Legislative Assembly election but could only finish third behind winner Jagdish Raj Dubey of the Janata Dal and Hari Chand of the Bahujan Samaj Party. He then joined the Jammu and Kashmir National Conference and contested on JKNC ticket in the 2002 Jammu and Kashmir Legislative Assembly election. He polled 13,298 votes and lost to Ashwani Kumar Sharma, an independent by 4,663 votes. He lost for the third time as a BSP candidate, again to the independent candidate Ashwani Sharma, in the 2008 Jammu and Kashmir Legislative Assembly election by 489 votes. He won in his fourth attempt in 2014.
