= Ashok Kumar (Jammu and Kashmir politician) =

Indian politician

Member of the Legislative Assembly
- In office 2008–2014
- Constituency: Ramban

Personal details
- Party: Indian National Congress

Ashok Kumar (Hindi: अशोक कुमार; born 24 November 1958) was a Member of the Jammu and Kashmir Legislative Assembly for Ramban. He was elected in the 2008 Jammu and Kashmir Legislative Assembly election and served one term. His political party is the Indian National Congress.

== Electoral performance ==
Election	Constituency	Party	Result	Votes %	Opposition Candidate	Opposition Party	Opposition vote %	Ref
2014	Ramban	INC	Lost	9.42%	Neelam Kumar Langeh	BJP	42.30%	
2008	Ramban	INC	Won	43.47%	Bali Bhagat	BJP	22.88%	
2002	Ramban	INC	Lost	30.10%	Chaman Lal	JKNC	36.12%	
