= Feroz Ahmed Khan =

Indian politician

CEC of Kargil Council
- Incumbent
- Assumed office 2018

Minister of State for Information Technology
- In office 2008–2014
- Succeeded by: Syed Mohammad Baqir Rizvi

Member of the Jammu and Kashmir Legislative Assembly
- In office 2008–2014
- Preceded by: Ghulam Raza
- Succeeded by: Syed Mohammad Baqir Rizvi
- Constituency: Zanskar

Personal details
- Party: Jammu and Kashmir National Conference
- Parent: Hassan Khan (father)

Feroz Ahmed Khan is an Indian politician who has served as a Member of the Jammu and Kashmir Legislative Assembly from the Zanskar Assembly constituency being associated with the Jammu and Kashmir National Conference since 2008 to 2014. He was the Minister of State for Information Technology Department. He became CEC of Kargil Council in 2018.
