= Gulmarg Assembly constituency =

Constituency of the Jammu and Kashmir legislative assembly in India

Coordinates: 34.05°N 74.38°E

Gulmarg
- Constituency No. 11 for the Jammu and Kashmir Legislative Assembly

Constituency details
- Country: India
- State: Jammu and Kashmir
- District: Baramulla
- Lok Sabha constituency: Baramulla
- Established: 2002

Member of Legislative Assembly
- Incumbent Peerzada Farooq Ahmed Shah
- Party: Jammu and Kashmir National Conference
- Elected year: 2024

Gulmarg is one of the 90 constituencies in the Jammu and Kashmir Legislative Assembly of Jammu and Kashmir, a union territory of India. Gulmarg is also part of Baramulla Lok Sabha constituency. It comprises Kawarhama tehsil, Kunzar tehsil and parts of Tangmarg tehsil, all in Baramulla district.

Pirzada Farooq Ahmed Shah is the current MLA from Gulmarg.

== Members of the Legislative Assembly ==
Election	Member	Party
1967	S. S. Singh	Jammu & Kashmir National Conference
1972	Surinder Singh	Indian National Congress
1977	Mohmad Akbar Lone	Jammu & Kashmir National Conference
1983	Ghulam Hassan Mir	Jammu & Kashmir National Conference
1987	Sheikh Mustafa Kamal	Jammu & Kashmir National Conference
1996	Sheikh Mustafa Kamal	Jammu & Kashmir National Conference
2002	Ghulam Hassan Mir	Jammu and Kashmir People's Democratic Party
2008	Ghulam Hassan Mir	Jammu & Kashmir Democratic Party Nationalist
2014	Mohammad Abass Wani	Jammu and Kashmir People's Democratic Party
2024	Pirzada Farooq Ahmed Shah	Jammu and Kashmir National Conference

== Election results ==
=== Assembly Election 2024 ===
2024 Jammu and Kashmir Legislative Assembly election : Gulmarg
Party	Candidate	Votes	%	±%
JKNC	Pirzada Farooq Ahmed Shah	26,984	41.27%	New
JKAP	Ghulam Hassan Mir	22,793	34.86%	New
JKPDP	Shabir Ahmed Mir	6,012	9.19%	▼24.61
Independent	Aadil Nazir Khan	4,656	7.12%	New
NOTA	None of the Above	1,494	2.28%	▲0.93
Independent	Amood Gulzar	743	1.14%	New
Independent	Umar Farooq Parry	545	0.83%	New
Independent	Syed Ameer Suhail	506	0.77%	New
Margin of victory		4,191	6.41%	▲2.27
Turnout		65,386	72.41%	▲0.71
Registered electors		90,296		▼4.65
JKNC gain from JKPDP		Swing	▲7.46	

=== Assembly Election 2014 ===
2014 Jammu and Kashmir Legislative Assembly election : Gulmarg
Party	Candidate	Votes	%	±%
JKPDP	Mohammad Abass Wani	22,957	33.81%	▲15.95
Jammu & Kashmir Democratic Party Nationalist	Ghulam Hassan Mir	20,146	29.67%	▼7.14
Independent	Shabir Ahmad Mir	11,083	16.32%	New
JKNC	Sheikh Mustafa Kamal	9,275	13.66%	▼10.16
Independent	Tejinder Singh	1,939	2.86%	New
NOTA	None of the Above	917	1.35%	New
All J & K Kisan Majdoor Party	Abdul Ahad Sheikh	645	0.95%	New
Independent	Mohammed Akram Mir	547	0.81%	New
Margin of victory		2,811	4.14%	▼8.85
Turnout		67,905	71.71%	▲11.91
Registered electors		94,700		▲14.19
JKPDP gain from Jammu & Kashmir Democratic Party Nationalist		Swing	▼3.00	

=== Assembly Election 2008 ===
2008 Jammu and Kashmir Legislative Assembly election : Gulmarg
Party	Candidate	Votes	%	±%
Jammu & Kashmir Democratic Party Nationalist	Ghulam Hassan Mir	18,253	36.81%	New
JKNC	Sheikh Mustafa Kamal	11,812	23.82%	▲1.98
JKPDP	Ghulam Mohi Ud Din Sheikh	8,854	17.85%	▼60.31
JKNPP	Mohammed Maqbool Malik	1,974	3.98%	New
Socialist Democratic Party (India)	Abdul Ahad Malik	1,322	2.67%	New
Independent	Irshada Akhtar	1,219	2.46%	New
BSP	Mohammed Shafi Bhat	1,037	2.09%	New
BJP	Nazir Ahmad Mir	998	2.01%	New
LJP	Abdul Hamid Malik	819	1.65%	New
JKANC	Syed Noor Ul Amin	766	1.54%	New
SP	Ghulam Rasool Malik	749	1.51%	New
Margin of victory		6,441	12.99%	▼43.34
Turnout		49,592	59.80%	▲9.37
Registered electors		82,935		▲17.84
Jammu & Kashmir Democratic Party Nationalist gain from JKPDP		Swing	▼41.36	

=== Assembly Election 2002 ===
2002 Jammu and Kashmir Legislative Assembly election : Gulmarg
Party	Candidate	Votes	%	±%
JKPDP	Ghulam Hassan Mir	27,737	78.16%	New
JKNC	Sheikh Mustafa Kamal	7,749	21.84%	▼27.39
Margin of victory		19,988	56.33%	▲51.68
Turnout		35,486	50.52%	▼13.42
Registered electors		70,378		▲19.09
JKPDP gain from JKNC		Swing		

=== Assembly Election 1996 ===
1996 Jammu and Kashmir Legislative Assembly election : Gulmarg
Party	Candidate	Votes	%	±%
JKNC	Sheikh Mustafa Kamal	18,575	49.23%	▼13.13
INC	Ghulam Hassan Mir	16,822	44.59%	New
JD	Ghulam Rasool Dar	2,333	6.18%	New
Margin of victory		1,753	4.65%	▼23.63
Turnout		37,730	65.16%	▼13.23
Registered electors		59,098		▲47.48
JKNC hold		Swing		

=== Assembly Election 1987 ===
1987 Jammu and Kashmir Legislative Assembly election : Gulmarg
Party	Candidate	Votes	%	±%
JKNC	Sheikh Mustafa Kamal	19,260	62.36%	▼0.17
Independent	Ghulam Hassan Mir	10,526	34.08%	New
JKNC	Syed Nisar Ahmad Nisar	967	3.13%	▼59.40
Margin of victory		8,734	28.28%	▼14.51
Turnout		30,885	78.95%	▲9.24
Registered electors		40,073		▲15.27
JKNC hold		Swing		

=== Assembly Election 1983 ===
1983 Jammu and Kashmir Legislative Assembly election : Gulmarg
Party	Candidate	Votes	%	±%
JKNC	Ghulam Hassan Mir	14,747	62.53%	▼16.06
INC	Mirza Ghulam Ahmad Beg	4,657	19.75%	▲12.12
JKNC	Nisar Ahmad Nisar	3,810	16.16%	▼62.44
Independent	Piaray Lal	368	1.56%	New
Margin of victory		10,090	42.79%	▼24.12
Turnout		23,582	72.53%	▲28.67
Registered electors		34,765		▼31.84
JKNC hold		Swing	▼16.06	

=== Assembly Election 1977 ===
1977 Jammu and Kashmir Legislative Assembly election : Gulmarg
Party	Candidate	Votes	%	±%
JKNC	Mohmad Akbar Lone	15,700	78.59%	New
JP	Mirza Ghulam Ahmad Beg	2,334	11.68%	New
INC	Ghulam Ahmad Lone	1,524	7.63%	▼43.29
Independent	Thakur Mangat Singh	418	2.09%	New
Margin of victory		13,366	66.91%	▲35.84
Turnout		19,976	40.85%	▼18.77
Registered electors		51,007		▲67.42
JKNC gain from INC		Swing	▲27.68	

=== Assembly Election 1972 ===
1972 Jammu and Kashmir Legislative Assembly election : Gulmarg
Party	Candidate	Votes	%	±%
INC	Surinder Singh	8,987	50.91%	▲31.51
Independent	Mirza Ghulam Ahmad Beg	3,502	19.84%	New
Independent	Mohammed Akbar	1,735	9.83%	New
Independent	Ghulam Qadir	1,322	7.49%	New
Independent	Mehraudin	744	4.22%	New
Independent	S. Jalaluddin Qadir	525	2.97%	New
Independent	Ghulam Ahmad Bhat	353	2.00%	New
Independent	Nissar Ahmad	252	1.43%	New
Independent	Abdul Aziz Reshi	231	1.31%	New
Margin of victory		5,485	31.07%	▼30.12
Turnout		17,651	60.31%	▲13.00
Registered electors		30,467		▲10.67
INC gain from JKNC		Swing	▼29.68	

=== Assembly Election 1967 ===
1967 Jammu and Kashmir Legislative Assembly election : Gulmarg
Party	Candidate	Votes	%	±%
JKNC	S. S. Singh	9,970	80.60%	New
INC	G. M. B. Jalile	2,400	19.40%	New
Margin of victory		7,570	61.20%	
Turnout		12,370	46.93%	
Registered electors		27,530		
JKNC win (new seat)				

== See also ==
- List of constituencies of the Jammu and Kashmir Legislative Assembly
- Baramulla district
