= Arjun Singh Raju =

Indian politician

Member of Jammu and Kashmir Legislative Assembly
- Incumbent
- Assumed office 8 October 2024
- Preceded by: Neelam Kumar Langeh
- Constituency: Ramban

Personal details
- Party: Jammu & Kashmir National Conference
- Profession: Politician

Arjun Singh Raju is an Indian politician from Jammu & Kashmir. He is a Member of the Jammu & Kashmir Legislative Assembly from 2024, representing Ramban Assembly constituency as a Member of the Jammu & Kashmir National Conference party.Arjun Singh Raju is an Indian politician from Jammu and Kashmir, serving as a Member of the Jammu and Kashmir Legislative Assembly (MLA) for the Ramban constituency since 2024. A member of the Jammu & Kashmir National Conference (JKNC), he was elected in the 2024 assembly election, defeating independent candidate Suraj Singh Parihar by a margin of 9,013 votes.�

Raju has emerged as a prominent voice for Ramban and Jammu & Kashmir on national and international platforms. In 2025, he became the first MLA from Ramban to represent Jammu and Kashmir at the National Conference of State Legislatures (NCSL) Legislative Summit in Boston, United States, held from 4–6 August 2025. He was part of a historic Indian delegation of more than 130 legislators from 24 states and 21 political parties, facilitated by National Legislators’ Conference Bharat (NLC Bharat).�

At the Boston summit, Raju engaged with over 7,000 legislators from around the world on issues including artificial intelligence in governance, digital democracy, cybersecurity, voter trust, and policy innovation. He also participated in academic interactions at Harvard University and the Massachusetts Institute of Technology (MIT), and visited the Massachusetts State House.�

In 2026, Raju again represented Jammu and Kashmir at the NCSL Legislative Summit in Chicago, Illinois, held from 27–29 July 2026. His repeated selection for the global legislative forum reflected his growing role in international legislative exchange and his commitment to bringing global best practices in governance, infrastructure, digital innovation, and public policy to Ramban and Jammu & Kashmir.

== See also ==
- 2024 Jammu & Kashmir Legislative Assembly election
- Jammu and Kashmir Legislative Assembly
