= Mohammad Abass Wani =

Indian politician (born 1965)

Mohammad Abass Wani (born 15 March 1965) is an Indian politician and sportsperson from Jammu and Kashmir. He was an MLA from Gulmarg Assembly constituency in Baramulla district. He served as president of the Winter Games Association of Jammu and Kashmir. He was the team manager of India's Winter Olympic Team Beijing 2022. He won the 2014 Jammu and Kashmir Legislative Assembly election representing the Jammu and Kashmir People's Democratic Party.

== Early life and education ==
Wani is from Chandilora, Tangmarg, Baramulla district, Jammu and Kashmir. He is the son of late Mohammad Akbar Wani. He is a passionate sportsperson who excelled in skiing from a young age, Later dedicating himself to promoting winter sports in Jammu and Kashmir.

== Career ==
Wani won from Gulmarg Assembly constituency representing the Jammu and Kashmir People's Democratic Party in the 2014 Jammu and Kashmir Legislative Assembly election. He polled 22,957 votes and defeated his nearest rival, Ghulam Hassan Mir of the JKDPN, by a margin of 2,811 votes.

He is currently the CEO of the Winter Games Association of Jammu and Kashmir.
