= Sajad Shaheen =

Indian politician

Member of Jammu and Kashmir Legislative Assembly
- Incumbent
- Assumed office 8 October 2024
- Preceded by: Vikar Rasool Wani
- Constituency: Banihal

Personal details
- Political party: Jammu & Kashmir National Conference
- Profession: Politician

Sajad Shaheen is an Indian politician from Jammu and Kashmir. He is a Member of the Jammu & Kashmir Legislative Assembly from 2024, representing Banihal Assembly constituency as a Member of the Jammu & Kashmir National Conference party.

== Electoral performance ==
Election	Constituency	Party	Result	Votes %	Opposition Candidate	Opposition Party	Opposition vote %	Ref
2024	Banihal	JKNC	Won	36.37%	Imtiaz Ahmed Shan	JKPDP	29.66%	
2014	Banihal	JKNC	Lost	22.55%	Vikar Rasool Wani	INC	30.65%	
2008	Banihal	JKNC	Lost	9.56%	Vikar Rasool Wani	INC	17.38%	

== See also ==
- 2024 Jammu & Kashmir Legislative Assembly election
- Jammu and Kashmir Legislative Assembly
