= Bishnah Assembly constituency =

Constituency of the Jammu and Kashmir legislative assembly in India

Coordinates: 32.614°N 74.856°E

Bishnah
- Constituency No. 72 for the Jammu and Kashmir Legislative Assembly

Constituency details
- Country: India
- State: Jammu and Kashmir
- District: Jammu
- Lok Sabha constituency: Jammu
- Established: 1962
- Reservation: SC

Member of Legislative Assembly
- Incumbent Rajeev Kumar
- Party: BJP
- Alliance: NDA
- Elected year: 2024

Bishnah Assembly constituency is one of the 90 constituencies in the Jammu and Kashmir Legislative Assembly of Jammu and Kashmir a north state of India. Bishnah is also part of Jammu Lok Sabha constituency.

== Members of the Legislative Assembly ==
Election	Member	Party
1962	Trilochan Datt	Jammu & Kashmir National Conference
1967	Bhagat Chhaju Ram	Indian National Congress
1972	Parma Nand	Indian National Congress
1977	Parma Nand	Indian National Congress
1983	Bhagat Chhaju Ram	Indian National Congress
1987	Parma Nand	Jammu & Kashmir National Conference
1996	Jagdish Raj Dubey	Janata Dal
2002	Ashwani Kumar Sharma	Independent politician
2008	Ashwani Kumar Sharma	Independent politician
2014	Kamal Verma	Jammu & Kashmir National Conference
2024	Rajeev Kumar	Bharatiya Janata Party

== Election results ==
=== Assembly Election 2024 ===
2024 Jammu and Kashmir Legislative Assembly election : Bishnah
Party	Candidate	Votes	%	±%
BJP	Rajeev Kumar	53,435	56.48	▲19.09
INC	Neeraj Kundan	37,808	39.96	▲35.33
Independent	Prem Pal	799	0.84	New
BSP	Tilak Raj	660	0.70	▼1.67
NOTA	None of the Above	401	0.42	▼0.27
Margin of victory		15,627	16.52	▲12.29
Turnout		94,611	78.99	▲2.84
Registered electors		1,19,782		▲29.22
BJP gain from JKNC		Swing	▲14.86	

=== Assembly Election 2014 ===
2014 Jammu and Kashmir Legislative Assembly election : Bishnah
Party	Candidate	Votes	%	±%
JKNC	Kamal Verma	29,380	41.62	▲33.16
BJP	Ashwani Kumar Sharma	26,394	37.39	▲29.01
JKPDP	Faqir Chand	8,112	11.49	New
INC	Gulchain Singh Charak	3,272	4.64	▼8.47
BSP	Bharat Bhushan	1,668	2.36	▼19.32
NOTA	None of the Above	490	0.69	New
JKNPP	Ghansham Sharma	473	0.67	New
Margin of victory		2,986	4.23	▲3.45
Turnout		70,587	76.15	▲0.38
Registered electors		92,694		▲12.06
JKNC gain from Independent		Swing	▲19.16	

=== Assembly Election 2008 ===
2008 Jammu and Kashmir Legislative Assembly election : Bishnah
Party	Candidate	Votes	%	±%
Independent	Ashwani Kumar Sharma	14,078	22.46	New
BSP	Kamal Verma	13,589	21.68	▲7.34
INC	Gulchain Singh Charak	8,212	13.10	▼1.96
JKNC	Yash Pal	5,306	8.47	▼15.76
BJP	Shilpi Verma	5,255	8.38	New
Independent	Romesh Kumar Gupta	3,751	5.98	New
Independent	Ashok Kumar Dubey	2,207	3.52	New
Independent	Chattar Singh	1,855	2.96	New
Independent	Romesh Chander	1,169	1.87	New
Independent	Gurbacahan Kumari Rana	1,072	1.71	New
Independent	Yash Pal Sharma	979	1.56	New
Margin of victory		489	0.78	▼7.71
Turnout		62,674	75.77	▲8.35
Registered electors		82,719		▲1.59
Independent hold		Swing	▼10.26	

=== Assembly Election 2002 ===
2002 Jammu and Kashmir Legislative Assembly election : Bishnah
Party	Candidate	Votes	%	±%
Independent	Ashwani Kumar Sharma	17,961	32.72	New
JKNC	Kamal Verma	13,298	24.22	▲18.61
INC	Jagdish Raj Dubey	8,268	15.06	▲3.00
BSP	Girdhari Lal	7,874	14.34	▼7.53
JKPDP	Ashok Kumar	2,060	3.75	New
Independent	Hari Chand	943	1.72	New
SS	Swaran Singh	780	1.42	New
Independent	Sat Pal Saini	566	1.03	New
CPI	Ghanisham Singh	519	0.95	New
JD(U)	Ashok Kumar	517	0.94	New
SAP	Joginder Kumar	492	0.90	New
Margin of victory		4,663	8.49	▲3.94
Turnout		54,895	67.43	▼1.27
Registered electors		81,424		▲35.09
Independent gain from JD		Swing	▲6.29	

=== Assembly Election 1996 ===
1996 Jammu and Kashmir Legislative Assembly election : Bishnah
Party	Candidate	Votes	%	±%
JD	Jagdish Raj Dubey	10,941	26.43	New
BSP	Hari Chand	9,057	21.88	New
Independent	Kamal Verma	7,239	17.49	New
INC	Janak Raj Gupta	4,994	12.06	New
Independent	Ashwani Kumar Sharma	3,859	9.32	New
JKNC	Sangram Singh Charak	2,323	5.61	▼48.04
BJP	Madan Lal	1,983	4.79	▼1.60
JKNPP	Sat Paul	704	1.70	New
Margin of victory		1,884	4.55	▼27.75
Turnout		41,401	69.80	▲3.39
Registered electors		60,274		▲29.40
JD gain from JKNC		Swing	▼27.23	

=== Assembly Election 1987 ===
1987 Jammu and Kashmir Legislative Assembly election : Bishnah
Party	Candidate	Votes	%	±%
JKNC	Parma Nand	16,319	53.65	▲27.70
Independent	Gian Chand	6,495	21.35	New
Independent	Mela Ram	3,793	12.47	New
BJP	Sardari Lal	1,944	6.39	New
JP	Hansraj	907	2.98	New
Independent	Rattan Singh	396	1.30	New
Independent	Assa Singh	240	0.79	New
Independent	Gurbachan Kumari	190	0.62	New
Margin of victory		9,824	32.30	▼8.93
Turnout		30,416	66.20	▼9.87
Registered electors		46,580		▲11.36
JKNC gain from INC		Swing	▼13.53	

=== Assembly Election 1983 ===
1983 Jammu and Kashmir Legislative Assembly election : Bishnah
Party	Candidate	Votes	%	±%
INC	Bhagat Chhaju Ram	21,123	67.18	▲24.01
JKNC	Parma Nand	8,159	25.95	▲14.63
Independent	Yash Pal	1,721	5.47	New
Independent	Om Raj	439	1.40	New
Margin of victory		12,964	41.23	▲31.70
Turnout		31,442	77.02	▲13.87
Registered electors		41,830		▲17.24
INC hold		Swing	▲24.01	

=== Assembly Election 1977 ===
1977 Jammu and Kashmir Legislative Assembly election : Bishnah
Party	Candidate	Votes	%	±%
INC	Parma Nand	9,441	43.17	▼20.83
JP	Ram Chand	7,357	33.64	New
JKNC	Sain Dass	2,476	11.32	New
Independent	Harbans Lal	2,052	9.38	New
Independent	Chaman Lal	335	1.53	New
Margin of victory		2,084	9.53	▼26.73
Turnout		21,870	62.31	▼11.69
Registered electors		35,679		▲11.31
INC hold		Swing	▼20.83	

=== Assembly Election 1972 ===
1972 Jammu and Kashmir Legislative Assembly election : Bishnah
Party	Candidate	Votes	%	±%
INC	Parma Nand	14,971	64.00	▲8.69
ABJS	Shiv Ram	6,489	27.74	▲8.53
Independent	Behari Lal	625	2.67	New
Independent	Jagat Ram	463	1.98	New
Independent	Shiv Bano Megh	461	1.97	New
Independent	Daulat Ram	385	1.65	New
Margin of victory		8,482	36.26	▲0.15
Turnout		23,394	75.42	▼4.42
Registered electors		32,054		▲24.34
INC hold		Swing	▲8.69	

=== Assembly Election 1967 ===
1967 Jammu and Kashmir Legislative Assembly election : Bishnah
Party	Candidate	Votes	%	±%
INC	Bhagat Chhaju Ram	11,037	55.31	New
ABJS	S. Dass	3,832	19.20	New
Democratic National Conference	M. N. Singh	2,641	13.23	▼17.62
JKNC	S. Ram	2,445	12.25	▼34.74
Margin of victory		7,205	36.11	▲19.98
Turnout		19,955	81.14	▼7.07
Registered electors		25,780		▲16.50
INC gain from JKNC		Swing	▲8.32	

=== Assembly Election 1962 ===
1962 Jammu and Kashmir Legislative Assembly election : Bishnah
Party	Candidate	Votes	%	±%
JKNC	Trilochan Datt	8,783	46.99	New
Democratic National Conference	Ram Piara Saraf	5,768	30.86	New
JPP	Shiv Lal	3,899	20.86	New
Independent	Isheri Singh	242	1.29	New
Margin of victory		3,015	16.13	
Turnout		18,692	85.04	
Registered electors		22,128		
JKNC win (new seat)				

== See also ==
- Jammu
- List of constituencies of Jammu and Kashmir Legislative Assembly
