= Zanskar (disambiguation) =

Zanskar may refer to

- Zanskar district in Ladakh, India
- Zanskar Range
- Zanskar River
- Zanskar Assembly constituency
- Zanskar Gorge
- Zanskar Highway
- Zanskar Valley
