= Bandipora Assembly constituency =

Constituency of the Jammu and Kashmir legislative assembly in India

Coordinates: 34.425°N 74.631°E

Bandipora
- Constituency No. 15 for the Jammu and Kashmir Legislative Assembly

Constituency details
- Country: India
- State: Jammu and Kashmir
- District: Bandipora
- Lok Sabha constituency: Baramulla
- Established: 1967

Member of Legislative Assembly
- Incumbent Nizam Uddin Bhat
- Party: Indian National Congress
- Elected year: 2024

Bandipora Assembly constituency is one of the 90 constituencies in the Jammu and Kashmir Legislative Assembly of Jammu and Kashmir a north state of India. Bandipora is also part of Baramulla Lok Sabha constituency.

== Members of the Legislative Assembly ==
| Election | Member | Party |
|---|---|---|
| 1962 | Abdul Kabir Khan | Jammu & Kashmir National Conference |
| 1967 | M. A. Khan | Indian National Congress |
| 1972 | M. A. Khan | Indian National Congress |
| 1977 | Mohammad Khalil Naik | Jammu & Kashmir National Conference |
| 1983 | Mohammad Khalil Naik | Jammu & Kashmir National Conference |
| 1987 | Ghulam Rasool Mir | Jammu & Kashmir National Conference |
| 1996 | Ghulam Rasool Mir | Jammu & Kashmir National Conference |
| 2002 | Usman Abdul Majid | Jammu and Kashmir Awami League |
| 2008 | Nizam Uddin Bhat | Jammu and Kashmir People's Democratic Party |
| 2014 | Usman Abdul Majid | Indian National Congress |
| 2024 | Nizam Uddin Bhat | Indian National Congress |

== Election results ==
=== Assembly Election 2024 ===
2024 Jammu and Kashmir Legislative Assembly election : Bandipora
| Party | Candidate | Votes | % | ±% |
|---|---|---|---|---|
| INC | Nizam Uddin Bhat | 20,391 | 27.45% | ▼10.24 |
| Independent | Usman Abdul Majid | 19,580 | 26.35% | New |
| Independent | Prince Parvez | 8,138 | 10.95% | New |
| JKAP | Syed Shafat Qazmi | 6,650 | 8.95% | New |
| Independent | Balkees Akhter | 2,920 | 3.93% | New |
| Independent | Mohammad Sikandar Malik | 2,411 | 3.25% | New |
| Independent | Mohammad Ismail Bhat | 1,785 | 2.40% | New |
| JKPDP | Syed Tajamul Islam | 1,769 | 2.38% | ▼29.68 |
| JKPC | Mudasir Ahmad Bhat | 1,762 | 2.37% | New |
| BJP | Naseer Ahmed Lone | 1,196 | 1.61% | New |
| NOTA | None of the Above | 501 | 0.67% | ▼1.79 |
| Margin of victory | | 811 | 1.09% | ▼4.53 |
| Turnout | | 74,296 | 64.06% | ▼3.37 |
| Registered electors | | 1,15,972 | | ▲17.50 |
| INC hold | | Swing | ▼10.24 | |

=== Assembly Election 2014 ===
2014 Jammu and Kashmir Legislative Assembly election : Bandipora
| Party | Candidate | Votes | % | ±% |
|---|---|---|---|---|
| INC | Usman Abdul Majid | 25,084 | 37.69% | New |
| JKPDP | Nizam Uddin Bhat | 21,341 | 32.06% | ▲5.96 |
| JKNC | Abdullah Wani | 6,754 | 10.15% | ▲3.03 |
| Independent | Nazir Ahmad Malik | 4,200 | 6.31% | New |
| NOTA | None of the Above | 1,641 | 2.47% | New |
| Jammu and Kashmir People Conference | Mohammad Ismail Bhat | 1,580 | 2.37% | New |
| Independent | Mohammed Shafi Khan | 1,137 | 1.71% | New |
| Independent | Mohammed Shafi Mir | 1,123 | 1.69% | New |
| BSP | Javid Ahmad Shah | 816 | 1.23% | New |
| Independent | Sheikh Waseem Bari | 796 | 1.20% | New |
| Independent | Gh Ahmad Bhat | 691 | 1.04% | New |
| Margin of victory | | 3,743 | 5.62% | ▲3.98 |
| Turnout | | 66,560 | 67.44% | ▲10.36 |
| Registered electors | | 98,701 | | ▲12.68 |
| INC gain from JKPDP | | Swing | ▲11.58 | |

=== Assembly Election 2008 ===
2008 Jammu and Kashmir Legislative Assembly election : Bandipora
| Party | Candidate | Votes | % | ±% |
|---|---|---|---|---|
| JKPDP | Nizam Uddin Bhat | 13,051 | 26.10% | New |
| Independent | Usman Abdul Majid | 12,231 | 24.46% | New |
| People's Democratic Front (Jammu and Kashmir) | Mohammad Abdullah Wani | 5,356 | 10.71% | New |
| Independent | Mohammed Ismail Bhat | 3,907 | 7.81% | New |
| JKNC | Ghulam Rasool Mir | 3,559 | 7.12% | ▼17.26 |
| Independent | Habibullah Bhat | 1,533 | 3.07% | New |
| JKNPP | Mohammed Iqbal Jan | 1,524 | 3.05% | New |
| RSP | Mohammed Qasim Mir | 1,296 | 2.59% | New |
| LJP | Mohammed Anwar Wani | 991 | 1.98% | New |
| Independent | Habib Ullah Pahloo | 883 | 1.77% | New |
| Independent | Noor Mohammad Sheergojri | 869 | 1.74% | New |
| Margin of victory | | 820 | 1.64% | ▲0.50 |
| Turnout | | 49,997 | 57.08% | ▲25.82 |
| Registered electors | | 87,596 | | ▲23.44 |
| JKPDP gain from JKAL | | Swing | ▲0.30 | |

=== Assembly Election 2002 ===
2002 Jammu and Kashmir Legislative Assembly election : Bandipora
| Party | Candidate | Votes | % | ±% |
|---|---|---|---|---|
| JKAL | Usman Abdul Majid | 5,722 | 25.80% | ▲3.31 |
| INC | Habibullah Bhat | 5,469 | 24.66% | ▲7.04 |
| JKNC | Javeed Hussain Shah | 5,407 | 24.38% | ▼13.92 |
| JKPDP | Mohammad Abdullah Wani | 3,706 | 16.71% | New |
| Independent | Abdul Majid Mir | 1,148 | 5.18% | New |
| Independent | Mohammed Amin Khan | 727 | 3.28% | New |
| Margin of victory | | 253 | 1.14% | ▼14.67 |
| Turnout | | 22,179 | 31.27% | ▼16.48 |
| Registered electors | | 70,963 | | ▲34.80 |
| JKAL gain from JKNC | | Swing | ▼12.50 | |

=== Assembly Election 1996 ===
1996 Jammu and Kashmir Legislative Assembly election : Bandipora
| Party | Candidate | Votes | % | ±% |
|---|---|---|---|---|
| JKNC | Ghulam Rasool Mir | 9,625 | 38.30% | ▼7.95 |
| JKAL | Usman Abdul Majid | 5,652 | 22.49% | New |
| INC | Habibullah Bhat | 4,429 | 17.62% | New |
| Independent | Abdul Majid | 2,254 | 8.97% | New |
| Independent | Syed Anayat Shah | 1,808 | 7.19% | New |
| JKNPP | Mohammed Sultan | 1,364 | 5.43% | New |
| Margin of victory | | 3,973 | 15.81% | ▲7.47 |
| Turnout | | 25,132 | 50.57% | ▼26.76 |
| Registered electors | | 52,645 | | ▲1.37 |
| JKNC hold | | Swing | ▼7.95 | |

=== Assembly Election 1987 ===
1987 Jammu and Kashmir Legislative Assembly election : Bandipora
| Party | Candidate | Votes | % | ±% |
|---|---|---|---|---|
| JKNC | Ghulam Rosool Mir | 17,894 | 46.25% | ▼7.06 |
| JKNC | Nizam-Ud-Din | 14,668 | 37.91% | ▼15.40 |
| Independent | Abdulla Malik | 4,843 | 12.52% | New |
| Independent | Hayatullah | 965 | 2.49% | New |
| Independent | Nazir Ahmed | 321 | 0.83% | New |
| Margin of victory | | 3,226 | 8.34% | ▼23.42 |
| Turnout | | 38,691 | 76.66% | ▼0.22 |
| Registered electors | | 51,932 | | ▲13.33 |
| JKNC hold | | Swing | ▼7.06 | |

=== Assembly Election 1983 ===
1983 Jammu and Kashmir Legislative Assembly election : Bandipora
| Party | Candidate | Votes | % | ±% |
|---|---|---|---|---|
| JKNC | Mohammad Khalil Naik | 18,253 | 53.31% | ▼17.63 |
| JKNC | Nizam Uddin Bhat | 7,380 | 21.55% | ▼49.38 |
| INC | Habibullah Bhat | 5,245 | 15.32% | ▲6.27 |
| JI | Ghulam Qadir Wani | 2,829 | 8.26% | ▲0.56 |
| Independent | Manzoor Ahmad Khan | 532 | 1.55% | New |
| Margin of victory | | 10,873 | 31.76% | ▼30.14 |
| Turnout | | 34,239 | 78.95% | ▲10.59 |
| Registered electors | | 45,824 | | ▲15.61 |
| JKNC hold | | Swing | ▼17.63 | |

=== Assembly Election 1977 ===
1977 Jammu and Kashmir Legislative Assembly election : Bandipora
| Party | Candidate | Votes | % | ±% |
|---|---|---|---|---|
| JKNC | Mohammad Khalil Naik | 18,032 | 70.94% | New |
| INC | Mohammed Anwar Khan | 2,299 | 9.04% | ▼51.42 |
| JP | Nizam-Ud-Din | 2,240 | 8.81% | New |
| JI | Mohammed Sultan Shah | 1,957 | 7.70% | ▼21.25 |
| Independent | Mohmad Maqsood | 656 | 2.58% | New |
| Independent | Attaullah Bhat | 235 | 0.92% | New |
| Margin of victory | | 15,733 | 61.89% | ▲30.38 |
| Turnout | | 25,419 | 68.45% | ▲0.39 |
| Registered electors | | 39,637 | | ▲7.97 |
| JKNC gain from INC | | Swing | ▲10.48 | |

=== Assembly Election 1972 ===
1972 Jammu and Kashmir Legislative Assembly election : Bandipora
| Party | Candidate | Votes | % | ±% |
|---|---|---|---|---|
| INC | M. A. Khan | 14,148 | 60.46% | ▲3.07 |
| JI | Mohammed Sultan Shah | 6,774 | 28.95% | New |
| Independent | Ghulam Mohiudin Mir | 2,310 | 9.87% | New |
| Independent | Mohammed Moqbool Parray | 168 | 0.72% | New |
| Margin of victory | | 7,374 | 31.51% | ▲11.48 |
| Turnout | | 23,400 | 65.64% | ▼4.42 |
| Registered electors | | 36,711 | | ▲12.80 |
| INC hold | | Swing | ▲3.07 | |

=== Assembly Election 1967 ===
1967 Jammu and Kashmir Legislative Assembly election : Bandipora
| Party | Candidate | Votes | % | ±% |
|---|---|---|---|---|
| INC | M. A. Khan | 12,733 | 57.39% | New |
| JKNC | Abdul Kabir Khan | 8,288 | 37.36% | ▼60.89 |
| Democratic National Conference | G. M. Lone | 1,164 | 5.25% | ▲3.50 |
| Margin of victory | | 4,445 | 20.04% | ▼76.47 |
| Turnout | | 22,185 | 69.99% | ▼21.63 |
| Registered electors | | 32,546 | | ▲35.85 |
| INC gain from JKNC | | Swing | ▼40.86 | |

=== Assembly Election 1962 ===
1962 Jammu and Kashmir Legislative Assembly election : Bandipora Gorez
| Party | Candidate | Votes | % | ±% |
|---|---|---|---|---|
| JKNC | Abdul Kabir Khan | 21,138 | 98.25% | New |
| Democratic National Conference | Ghulam Mohammad Lone | 376 | 1.75% | New |
| Margin of victory | | 20,762 | 96.50% | |
| Turnout | | 21,514 | 90.55% | |
| Registered electors | | 23,958 | | |
| JKNC win (new seat) | | | | |

== See also ==
- Bandipora
- Bandipora district
- List of constituencies of Jammu and Kashmir Legislative Assembly
