= Ashwani Kumar Sharma =

Ashwani Kumar Sharma may refer to:

- Ashwani Kumar Sharma (Punjab politician)
- Ashwani Kumar Sharma (Jammu and Kashmir politician)
