= Zafar Ali Khatana =

Indian politician

Member of Jammu and Kashmir Legislative Assembly
- Incumbent
- Assumed office 8 October 2024
- Preceded by: Abdul Rahim Rather
- Constituency: Kokernag

Personal details
- Party: Jammu & Kashmir National Conference
- Profession: Politician

Zafar Ali Khatana is an Indian politician from Jammu & Kashmir. He is a Member of the Jammu & Kashmir Legislative Assembly from 2024, representing Kokernag Assembly constituency as a Member of the Jammu & Kashmir National Conference party.

== Electoral performance ==
Election	Constituency	Party	Result	Votes %	Opposition Candidate	Opposition Party	Opposition vote %	Ref
2024	Kokernag	JKNC	Won	31.23%	Haroon Rashid Khatana	JKPDP	20.51%	

== See also ==
- 2024 Jammu & Kashmir Legislative Assembly election
- Jammu and Kashmir Legislative Assembly
