= Ramban Assembly constituency =

Constituency of the Jammu and Kashmir Legislative Assembly

Coordinates: 33.25°N 75.19°E

Ramban
- Constituency No. 54 for the Jammu and Kashmir Legislative Assembly

Constituency details
- Country: India
- State: Jammu and Kashmir
- District: Ramban
- Lok Sabha constituency: Udhampur
- Established: 1962

Member of Legislative Assembly
- Incumbent Arjun Singh Raju
- Party: Jammu & Kashmir National Conference
- Elected year: 2024

Ramban Assembly constituency is one of the 90 constituencies in the Jammu and Kashmir Legislative Assembly of Jammu and Kashmir a north state of India. Ramban is also part of Udhampur Lok Sabha constituency.

== Members of the Legislative Assembly ==
Election	Member	Party
1962	Mir Assadullah	Jammu & Kashmir National Conference
1967	H. Raj	Indian National Congress
1972	Mohammed Akhtar Nizami	Indian National Congress
1977	Prem Nath	Jammu & Kashmir National Conference
1983	Jagdev Singh	Indian National Congress
1987	Bharat Gandhi	Indian National Congress
1996	Bali Bhagat	Bharatiya Janata Party
2002	Dr. Chaman Lal	Jammu & Kashmir National Conference
2008	Ashok Kumar	Indian National Congress
2014	Neelam Kumar Langeh	Bharatiya Janata Party
2024	Arjun Singh Raju	Jammu and Kashmir National Conference

== Election results ==
=== Assembly Election 2024 ===
2024 Jammu and Kashmir Legislative Assembly election : Ramban
Party	Candidate	Votes	%	±%
JKNC	Arjun Singh Raju	28,425	41.07	New
Independent	Suraj Singh Parihar	19,412	28.05	New
BJP	Rakesh Singh Thakur	17,511	25.30	▼17.00
Independent	Sunil Singh	1,371	1.98	New
SS(UBT)	Tilak Raj	567	0.82	New
Independent	Suteesh Kumar	428	0.62	New
NOTA	None of the Above	1,123	1.62	▼0.12
Margin of victory		9,013	13.02	▲4.07
Turnout		69,207	63.18	▼6.02
Registered electors		1,09,543		▲26.49
JKNC gain from BJP		Swing	▼1.23	

=== Assembly Election 2014 ===
2014 Jammu and Kashmir Legislative Assembly election : Ramban
Party	Candidate	Votes	%	±%
BJP	Neelam Kumar Langeh	25,349	42.30	▲19.42
JKNC	Dr. Chaman Lal	19,985	33.35	▲10.60
INC	Ashok Kumar	5,643	9.42	▼34.06
JKPDP	Swami Raj	4,672	7.80	▲6.10
SP	Amrit Barsha	1,156	1.93	▲0.37
JKNPP	Suraish Kumar	1,123	1.87	▼0.53
BSP	Prithvi Raj	530	0.88	New
NOTA	None of the Above	1,047	1.75	New
Margin of victory		5,364	8.95	▼11.65
Turnout		59,928	69.20	▲3.61
Registered electors		86,604		▲13.38
BJP gain from INC		Swing	▼1.17	

=== Assembly Election 2008 ===
2008 Jammu and Kashmir Legislative Assembly election : Ramban
Party	Candidate	Votes	%	±%
INC	Ashok Kumar	21,779	43.47	▲13.38
BJP	Bali Bhagat	11,460	22.88	▼5.76
JKNC	Dr. Chaman Lal	11,395	22.75	▼13.38
JKNPP	Neelam Kumar	1,203	2.40	New
JKPDP	Shakeel Singh	851	1.70	▼0.44
SP	Amrit Barsha	783	1.56	New
NCP	Bodh Raj	493	0.98	New
Margin of victory		10,319	20.60	▲14.57
Turnout		50,097	65.59	▲7.88
Registered electors		76,384		▲4.62
INC gain from JKNC		Swing	▲7.35	

=== Assembly Election 2002 ===
2002 Jammu and Kashmir Legislative Assembly election : Ramban
Party	Candidate	Votes	%	±%
JKNC	Dr. Chaman Lal	15,220	36.12	▼2.19
INC	Ashok Kumar	12,681	30.10	▲25.57
BJP	Bali Bhagat	12,064	28.63	▼18.15
JKPDP	Hukam Chand	902	2.14	New
BSP	Kaka Ram	670	1.59	▼5.10
Independent	Kamla Devi	596	1.41	New
Margin of victory		2,539	6.03	▼2.44
Turnout		42,133	57.71	▼2.76
Registered electors		73,011		▲67.09
JKNC gain from BJP		Swing	▼10.66	

=== Assembly Election 1996 ===
1996 Jammu and Kashmir Legislative Assembly election : Ramban
Party	Candidate	Votes	%	±%
BJP	Bali Bhagat	12,359	46.78	▲42.36
JKNC	Suram Chand	10,123	38.32	New
BSP	Jagat Ram	1,768	6.69	New
INC	Amrit Barsha	1,197	4.53	▼53.79
JD	Bal Krishan	706	2.67	New
Independent	Man Chand	267	1.01	New
Margin of victory		2,236	8.46	▼14.89
Turnout		26,420	61.26	▼5.43
Registered electors		43,696		▲17.11
BJP gain from INC		Swing	▼11.55	

=== Assembly Election 1987 ===
1987 Jammu and Kashmir Legislative Assembly election : Ramban
Party	Candidate	Votes	%	±%
INC	Bharat Gandhi	14,339	58.32	▲15.15
Independent	Tirth Singh	8,597	34.97	New
BJP	Nazir Ahmed	1,086	4.42	▼3.58
Margin of victory		5,742	23.36	▲18.02
Turnout		24,585	66.90	▲5.81
Registered electors		37,312		▲13.60
INC hold		Swing		

=== Assembly Election 1983 ===
1983 Jammu and Kashmir Legislative Assembly election : Ramban
Party	Candidate	Votes	%	±%
INC	Jagdev Singh	8,519	43.17	▲30.50
JKNC	Prem Singh	7,467	37.84	▲9.20
BJP	Labhu Ram	1,578	8.00	New
Independent	Abdul Gani	1,037	5.26	New
Independent	Nazir Ahmad	293	1.48	New
Independent	Gurdass	287	1.45	New
Independent	Jia Lal	225	1.14	New
Margin of victory		1,052	5.33	▲1.73
Turnout		19,733	61.18	▲15.41
Registered electors		32,844		▲21.02
INC gain from JKNC		Swing	▲14.53	

=== Assembly Election 1977 ===
1977 Jammu and Kashmir Legislative Assembly election : Ramban
Party	Candidate	Votes	%	±%
JKNC	Prem Nath	3,472	28.64	New
Independent	Labhu Ram	3,035	25.03	New
JP	Jagdev Singh	2,967	24.47	New
INC	Abdul Rehman	1,536	12.67	▼47.64
Independent	Mohammed Abdullah	369	3.04	New
Independent	Amer Chand	346	2.85	New
Independent	Swami Raj	304	2.51	New
Margin of victory		437	3.60	▼36.07
Turnout		12,124	45.72	▼4.43
Registered electors		27,139		▲2.12
JKNC gain from INC		Swing	▼31.67	

=== Assembly Election 1972 ===
1972 Jammu and Kashmir Legislative Assembly election : Ramban
Party	Candidate	Votes	%	±%
INC	Mohammed Akhtar Nizami	7,870	60.31	▲17.82
ABJS	Labhu Ram	2,692	20.63	▼7.25
Independent	Jagdev Singh	2,488	19.07	New
Margin of victory		5,178	39.68	▲26.82
Turnout		13,050	50.61	▲8.20
Registered electors		26,575		▲18.06
INC hold		Swing		

=== Assembly Election 1967 ===
1967 Jammu and Kashmir Legislative Assembly election : Ramban
Party	Candidate	Votes	%	±%
INC	H. Raj	3,913	42.49	New
PSP	D. Dass	2,729	29.63	▲16.07
ABJS	Labhu Ram	2,567	27.87	New
Margin of victory		1,184	12.86	▼56.97
Turnout		9,209	42.48	▼37.80
Registered electors		22,510		▼19.41
INC gain from JKNC		Swing	▼40.90	

=== Assembly Election 1962 ===
1962 Jammu and Kashmir Legislative Assembly election : Ramban
Party	Candidate	Votes	%	±%
JKNC	Mir Assadullah	18,332	83.39	New
PSP	Devi Dass	2,981	13.56	New
JPP	Labhu Ram	670	3.05	New
Margin of victory		15,351	69.83	
Turnout		21,983	79.58	
Registered electors		27,930		
JKNC win (new seat)				

== See also ==
- Ramban
- List of constituencies of Jammu and Kashmir Legislative Assembly
