= Usman Abdul Majid =

Indian politician (born 1961)

Usman Abdul Majid (born 1961) is an Indian politician from Jammu and Kashmir. He was an MLA from Bandipora Assembly constituency in Bandipore district. He won the 2014 Jammu and Kashmir Legislative Assembly election representing the Indian National Congress. He contested from the same in 2024 Jammu and Kashmir Legislative Assembly election seat as an independent candidate but lost.

== Early life and education ==
Majid is from Bandipora, Bandipur district, Jammu and Kashmir. He is the son of Abdul Kabir Ganie. He completed his B.A. in 1985 from a college affiliated with the University of Kashmir. He was a member of the Jammu and Kashmir Students' Liberation Front.

== Career ==
Majid won from Bandipora Assembly constituency representing Indian National Congress in the 2014 Jammu and Kashmir Legislative Assembly election. He polled 25,084 votes and defeated his nearest rival, Nizamudin Bhat of the Jammu and Kashmir People's Democratic Party, by a margin of 3,743 votes. He lost the seat in 2024 as an independent candidate by a margin of 811 votes.
