= Hakeem Yasin =

Indian politician

Hakeem Mohammad Yaseen Shah
- Hakeem Yasin

Chairman of Jammu and Kashmir People's Democratic Front
- Incumbent
- Assumed office December 2008

Member in J&K Legislative Assembly
- In office 10 October 2002 – 12 November 2018
- Preceded by: Abdul Gani Naseem
- Succeeded by: Saif Ud Din Bhat
- Constituency: Khansahib

Minister for Transport, Food, Civil Supplies, and Consumer Affairs, Government of J&K
- In office 2005–2008

Minister for Revenue, Irrigation, and Power, Government of J&K
- In office 2002–2005

Personal details
- Born: 9 December 1948 (age 77) Khansahib, Jammu and Kashmir, India
- Party: Jammu and Kashmir People's Democratic Front (JKPDF)
- Parent: Hakeem Abdul Ahad Shah (father)
- Occupation: Politician

Hakeem Mohammad Yaseen Shah (born 1948) is a senior Indian politician from Jammu and Kashmir. He is the founder and chairman of the Jammu and Kashmir People's Democratic Front (JKPDF or PDF). He represented the Khan Sahib Assembly constituency in the Jammu and Kashmir Legislative Assembly, serving consecutive terms from 1977 to 1987, and again from 2002 to 2018. During his tenure in the state administration, he held multiple cabinet portfolios, serving as the Minister for Revenue, Irrigation, Transport, and Food.

== Early life and education ==
Hakeem Mohammad Yaseen Shah was born on 9 December 1948 in the Khansahib town of Budgam district, Jammu and Kashmir. He was born into the local Hakeem family, the son of Hakeem Abdul Ahad Shah.

Yaseen received his early education in Budgam, where he was mentored under teacher Abdul Gani Naseem, a local educator who would ironically go on to enter politics and contest an assembly election against Yaseen decades later in 2002. Yaseen completed his formal secondary education by passing his matriculation (10th standard) examinations from Government Higher Secondary School, Khansahib during the academic year 1966–1967.

== Personal life ==
Yaseen resides permanently in his native constituency of Khansahib, Budgam. Aside from his career as an elected legislator and political organizer, his primary self-declared profession is full-time political and social activism.

== Political career ==
=== Early career and Legislative Assembly (1977–1987) ===
Hakeem Yaseen entered mainstream politics in the 1970s, aligning himself with the Jammu & Kashmir National Conference (JKNC). He contested his first legislative election during the 1977 Jammu and Kashmir Legislative Assembly election, representing the Khansahib constituency. He won the election by securing 15,647 votes, defeating his closest competitor, Ghulam Qadir War of the Janata Party, who received 3,814 votes.

Yaseen consolidated his support in the Budgam district and successfully held the Khansahib seat consecutively through the subsequent assembly cycle until 1987.

=== Shift to Independent politics and formation of JKPDF (2002–2018) ===
Following a period of political realignment in the state, Yaseen distanced himself from the National Conference. He contested the 2002 elections from Khansahib as an independent candidate, winning the seat decisively by securing 20,186 votes (67.2% of the vote share) and defeating the sitting National Conference MLA, Abdul Gani Naseem.

Following his 2002 victory, Yaseen went on to found the Jammu and Kashmir People's Democratic Front (Secular) (JKPDF), serving as its chairman. Under the new JKPDF banner, he successfully maintained his dominance over the Khansahib constituency, winning consecutive terms in both the 2008 and 2014 state elections. He continued to represent the seat as a legislator until the state assembly was dissolved in 2018.

During his legislative tenures within the state administration, he served in the cabinet under multiple portfolios, holding office as the Minister for Revenue, Irrigation, Transport, and Food.

=== Post-2018 politics ===
Following the revocation of Jammu and Kashmir's special status in 2019, Yaseen emerged as a prominent advocate for the immediate restoration of full statehood to the territory, repeatedly calling on the central government to establish a definitive timeline for democratic transition.

He contested the 2024 Jammu and Kashmir Legislative Assembly election from his traditional bastion of Khansahib. However, he finished as the runner-up after receiving 21,611 votes, losing the seat to Saif Ud Din Bhat of the Jammu & Kashmir National Conference.

=== Election results ===
| Year | Constituency | Party | Votes | % | Result |
|---|---|---|---|---|---|
| 1977 | Khansahib | JKNC | 15,647 | 73.9% | ✓ Elected |
| 1983 | Khansahib | JKNC | 13,737 | 58.1% | ✓ Elected |
| 2002 | Khansahib | Independent | 20,186 | 67.2% | ✓ Elected |
| 2008 | Khansahib | JKPDF | 22,616 | 41.9% | ✓ Elected |
| 2014 | Khansahib | JKPDF | 26,649 | 38.5% | ✓ Elected |
| 2024 | Khansahib | JKPDF | 21,611 | 32.7% | ✗ Defeated |

== See also ==
- 2024 Jammu & Kashmir Legislative Assembly election
- Jammu and Kashmir Legislative Assembly
- Khan Sahib Assembly constituency
