= Zanskar Assembly constituency =

Former constituency of the Jammu and Kashmir legislative assembly in India

Coordinates: 33.56°N 76.99°E

Zanskar
- Former constituency for the Jammu and Kashmir Legislative Assembly

Constituency details
- Country: India
- Region: North India
- State: Jammu and Kashmir
- District: Kargil
- Established: 1996
- Abolished: 2019

Zanskar was a constituency in the erstwhile Jammu and Kashmir Legislative Assembly of erstwhile Jammu and Kashmir a north state of India. Zanskar was part of Ladakh Lok Sabha constituency until its abolition.

== Members of the Legislative Assembly ==
Election	Member	Party
1996	Mohammed Abass	Jammu & Kashmir National Conference
2002	Mohammed Abass	Jammu & Kashmir National Conference
2008	Feroz Ahmed Khan	Jammu & Kashmir National Conference
2014	Syed Mohammad Baqir Rizvi	Independent politician

== Election results ==
=== Assembly Election 2014 ===
2014 Jammu and Kashmir Legislative Assembly election : Zanskar
Party	Candidate	Votes	%	±%
Independent	Syed Mohammad Baqir Rizvi	6,763	43.19%	New
INC	Ghulam Raza	6,197	39.58%	▲1.13
BJP	Stanzin Lakpa	2,292	14.64%	New
JKPDP	Ghulam Mohammad	248	1.58%	▼0.35
NOTA	None of the Above	157	1.00%	New
Margin of victory		566	3.61%	▼2.65
Turnout		15,657	74.05%	▲1.86
Registered electors		21,143		▲4.18
Independent gain from JKNC		Swing	▼1.52	

=== Assembly Election 2008 ===
2008 Jammu and Kashmir Legislative Assembly election : Zanskar
Party	Candidate	Votes	%	±%
JKNC	Feroz Ahmed Khan	6,552	44.72%	▼2.95
INC	Ghulam Raza	5,634	38.45%	▲17.71
Independent	Sonam Stobgais	1,993	13.60%	New
JKPDP	Mohammed Amin	283	1.93%	New
BSP	Padma Thinles	190	1.30%	New
Margin of victory		918	6.27%	▼11.44
Turnout		14,652	72.20%	▼6.77
Registered electors		20,295		▼10.96
JKNC hold		Swing	▼2.95	

=== Assembly Election 2002 ===
2002 Jammu and Kashmir Legislative Assembly election : Zanskar
Party	Candidate	Votes	%	±%
JKNC	Mohammed Abass	8,580	47.67%	▲0.77
Independent	Tsering Chhosphel	5,393	29.96%	New
INC	Akhoon Hassan	3,734	20.75%	▼17.29
BJP	Ahsan Ali	291	1.62%	▼13.45
Margin of victory		3,187	17.71%	▲8.84
Turnout		17,998	78.97%	▲0.38
Registered electors		22,792		▲22.54
JKNC hold		Swing	▲0.77	

=== Assembly Election 1996 ===
1996 Jammu and Kashmir Legislative Assembly election : Zanskar
Party	Candidate	Votes	%	±%
JKNC	Mohammed Abass	6,855	46.90%	New
INC	Kachoo Mohammed Ali Khan	5,559	38.03%	New
BJP	Stanzin Lakpa	2,202	15.07%	New
Margin of victory		1,296	8.87%	
Turnout		14,616	79.92%	
Registered electors		18,599		
JKNC win (new seat)				

== See also ==
- Zanskar
- Leh district
