= Khan Sahib Assembly constituency =

Constituency of the Jammu and Kashmir Legislative Assembly

Coordinates: 33.93°N 74.66°E

Khan Sahib
- Constituency No. 29 for the Jammu and Kashmir Legislative Assembly

Constituency details
- Country: India
- State: Jammu and Kashmir
- District: Budgam
- Lok Sabha constituency: Srinagar
- Established: 1962

Member of Legislative Assembly
- Incumbent Saif Ud Din Bhat
- Party: Jammu and Kashmir National Conference
- Elected year: 2024

Khan Sahib Assembly constituency is one of the 90 constituencies in the Jammu and Kashmir Legislative Assembly of Jammu and Kashmir a north state of India. Khan Sahib is also part of Srinagar Lok Sabha constituency.

== Members of the Legislative Assembly ==
| Election | Member | Party |
|---|---|---|
| 1962 | Ghulam Mohiuddin Khan | Jammu and Kashmir National Conference |
| 1967 | A. G. Namthali | Indian National Congress |
| 1972 | Ghulam Qadir War | Indian National Congress |
| 1977 | Hakeem Mohammad Yaseen Shah | Jammu and Kashmir National Conference |
| 1983 | Hakeem Mohammad Yaseen Shah | Jammu and Kashmir National Conference |
| 1987 | Hakeem Mohammad Yaseen Shah | Independent |
| 1996 | Abdul Gani Naseem | Jammu and Kashmir National Conference |
| 2002 | Hakeem Mohammad Yaseen Shah | Jammu and Kashmir National Conference |
| 2008 | Hakeem Mohammad Yaseen Shah | Jammu and Kashmir People's Democratic Front |
| 2014 | Hakeem Mohammad Yaseen Shah | Jammu and Kashmir People's Democratic Front |
| 2024 | Saif Ud Din Bhat | Jammu and Kashmir National Conference |

== Election results ==
=== Assembly Election 2024 ===
2024 Jammu and Kashmir Legislative Assembly election : Khan Sahib
| Party | Candidate | Votes | % | ±% |
|---|---|---|---|---|
| JKNC | Saif Ud Din Bhat | 33,225 | 48.62% | New |
| JKPDF | Hakeem Mohammad Yaseen Shah | 21,611 | 31.63% | ▼6.54 |
| JKPDP | Manzoor Ahmad Wani | 3,334 | 4.88% | ▼31.70 |
| Independent | Jahangir Ahmad Sheikh | 2,643 | 3.87% | New |
| BJP | Dr Ali Mohammed Mir | 1,605 | 2.35% | New |
| JKPC | Firdouse Ahmed Farash | 1,407 | 2.06% | New |
| Independent | Mudasir Ahmad Shah | 834 | 1.22% | New |
| NOTA | None of the Above | 2,364 | 3.46% | ▲2.62 |
| Margin of victory | | 11,614 | 17.00% | ▲15.41 |
| Turnout | | 68,330 | 72.68% | ▼8.48 |
| Registered electors | | 94,016 | | ▲9.27 |
| JKNC gain from JKPDF | | Swing | ▲10.46 | |

=== Assembly Election 2014 ===
2014 Jammu and Kashmir Legislative Assembly election : Khan Sahib
| Party | Candidate | Votes | % | ±% |
|---|---|---|---|---|
| JKPDF | Hakeem Mohammad Yaseen Shah | 26,649 | 38.16% | New |
| JKPDP | Saif Ud Din Bhat | 25,540 | 36.58% | ▲10.21 |
| JKNC | Manzoor Ahmad Wani | 15,397 | 22.05% | ▲2.29 |
| Independent | Bashir Ahmad Khan | 697 | 1.00% | New |
| INC | Abdul Gani Naseem | 648 | 0.93% | New |
| NOTA | None of the Above | 585 | 0.84% | New |
| Margin of victory | | 1,109 | 1.59% | ▼13.98 |
| Turnout | | 69,828 | 81.16% | ▲6.43 |
| Registered electors | | 86,041 | | ▲19.22 |
| JKPDF gain from JKPDF | | Swing | ▼3.77 | |

=== Assembly Election 2008 ===
2008 Jammu and Kashmir Legislative Assembly election : Khan Sahib
| Party | Candidate | Votes | % | ±% |
|---|---|---|---|---|
| JKPDF | Hakeem Mohammad Yaseen Shah | 22,616 | 41.94% | New |
| JKPDP | Saif Ud Din Bhat | 14,221 | 26.37% | ▲20.53 |
| JKNC | Tariq Mohi Ud Din | 10,658 | 19.76% | ▲5.13 |
| LJP | Nazir Ahmad Malla | 1,976 | 3.66% | New |
| Independent | Abdul Gani Naseem | 952 | 1.77% | New |
| Independent | Bashir Ahmad Khan | 826 | 1.53% | New |
| BSP | Mohammed Ashraf Khan | 657 | 1.22% | New |
| Margin of victory | | 8,395 | 15.57% | ▼37.03 |
| Turnout | | 53,930 | 74.73% | ▲25.21 |
| Registered electors | | 72,169 | | ▲19.00 |
| JKPDF gain from Independent | | Swing | ▼25.29 | |

=== Assembly Election 2002 ===
2002 Jammu and Kashmir Legislative Assembly election : Khan Sahib
| Party | Candidate | Votes | % | ±% |
|---|---|---|---|---|
| Independent | Hakeem Mohammad Yaseen Shah | 20,186 | 67.22% | New |
| JKNC | Abdul Gani Naseem | 4,393 | 14.63% | ▼26.02 |
| INC | Tariq Mohi-Ud-Din | 3,696 | 12.31% | ▼5.64 |
| JKPDP | Bilal Ahmad Khan Lodhi | 1,753 | 5.84% | New |
| Margin of victory | | 15,793 | 52.59% | ▲31.83 |
| Turnout | | 30,028 | 49.51% | ▼11.31 |
| Registered electors | | 60,645 | | ▲17.30 |
| Independent gain from JKNC | | Swing | ▲26.57 | |

=== Assembly Election 1996 ===
1996 Jammu and Kashmir Legislative Assembly election : Khan Sahib
| Party | Candidate | Votes | % | ±% |
|---|---|---|---|---|
| JKNC | Abdul Gani Naseem | 12,785 | 40.65% | ▲28.59 |
| JD | Nazir Ahmad Khan | 6,254 | 19.89% | New |
| INC | Tariq Mohi-Ud-Din | 5,643 | 17.94% | ▼52.09 |
| Independent | Bashir Ahmed | 2,440 | 7.76% | New |
| JKAL | Ghulam Mohammad | 1,683 | 5.35% | New |
| JKNPP | Qadir | 1,274 | 4.05% | New |
| BSP | Baqir Thokar | 866 | 2.75% | New |
| Margin of victory | | 6,531 | 20.77% | ▼37.20 |
| Turnout | | 31,448 | 63.55% | ▼19.71 |
| Registered electors | | 51,700 | | ▲20.60 |
| JKNC gain from INC | | Swing | ▼29.38 | |

=== Assembly Election 1987 ===
1987 Jammu and Kashmir Legislative Assembly election : Khan Sahib
| Party | Candidate | Votes | % | ±% |
|---|---|---|---|---|
| INC | Ghulam Mohmad Mir | 24,180 | 70.03% | ▲50.76 |
| JKNC | Ghulam Qadir War | 4,166 | 12.07% | ▼46.02 |
| Independent | Hakeem Mohammad Yaseen Shah | 3,202 | 9.27% | New |
| Independent | Mohmad Shafi Khan | 1,611 | 4.67% | New |
| Independent | Shafi Khan | 1,367 | 3.96% | New |
| Margin of victory | | 20,014 | 57.97% | ▲19.15 |
| Turnout | | 34,526 | 82.21% | ▲15.36 |
| Registered electors | | 42,869 | | ▲18.16 |
| INC gain from JKNC | | Swing | ▲11.94 | |

=== Assembly Election 1983 ===
1983 Jammu and Kashmir Legislative Assembly election : Khan Sahib
| Party | Candidate | Votes | % | ±% |
|---|---|---|---|---|
| JKNC | Hakeem Mohammad Yaseen Shah | 13,737 | 58.09% | ▼15.85 |
| INC | Ghulam Ahmad Barray | 4,557 | 19.27% | New |
| Independent | Ali Mohmad Shahnaz | 2,903 | 12.28% | New |
| JKNC | Ghulam Qadir War | 2,451 | 10.36% | ▼63.57 |
| Margin of victory | | 9,180 | 38.82% | ▼17.09 |
| Turnout | | 23,648 | 70.86% | ▲3.58 |
| Registered electors | | 36,282 | | ▲5.60 |
| JKNC hold | | Swing | ▼15.85 | |

=== Assembly Election 1977 ===
1977 Jammu and Kashmir Legislative Assembly election : Khan Sahib
| Party | Candidate | Votes | % | ±% |
|---|---|---|---|---|
| JKNC | Hakeem Mohammad Yaseen Shah | 15,647 | 73.94% | New |
| JP | Ghulam Qadir War | 3,814 | 18.02% | New |
| Independent | Abdul Qayoom Shah | 1,035 | 4.89% | New |
| Independent | Ghulam Mohamed Bakshi | 667 | 3.15% | New |
| Margin of victory | | 11,833 | 55.91% | ▼18.70 |
| Turnout | | 21,163 | 66.42% | ▲1.15 |
| Registered electors | | 34,359 | | ▲11.44 |
| JKNC gain from INC | | Swing | ▼11.92 | |

=== Assembly Election 1972 ===
1972 Jammu and Kashmir Legislative Assembly election : Khan Sahib
| Party | Candidate | Votes | % | ±% |
|---|---|---|---|---|
| INC | Ghulam Qadir War | 15,998 | 85.85% | New |
| Independent | Ghulam Ahamad Parry | 2,094 | 11.24% | New |
| Independent | Raj Nath | 542 | 2.91% | New |
| Margin of victory | | 13,904 | 74.62% | |
| Turnout | | 18,634 | 62.31% | ▲60.44 |
| Registered electors | | 30,831 | | ▲7.96 |
| INC hold | | Swing | | |

=== Assembly Election 1967 ===
1967 Jammu and Kashmir Legislative Assembly election : Khan Sahib
| Party | Candidate | Votes | % | ±% |
|---|---|---|---|---|
| INC | A. G. Namthali | Unopposed | | |
| Registered electors | | 28,558 | | ▲34.82 |
| INC gain from JKNC | | Swing | | |

=== Assembly Election 1962 ===
1962 Jammu and Kashmir Legislative Assembly election : Khan Sahib
| Party | Candidate | Votes | % | ±% |
|---|---|---|---|---|
| JKNC | Ghulam Mohi-Ud-Din Khan | 9,687 | 76.31% | New |
| Independent | Ghulam Mohammed Bakshi | 3,007 | 23.69% | New |
| Margin of victory | | 6,680 | 52.62% | |
| Turnout | | 12,694 | 61.60% | |
| Registered electors | | 21,182 | | |
| JKNC win (new seat) | | | | |

== See also ==
- Khan Sahib
- List of constituencies of Jammu and Kashmir Legislative Assembly
- Hakeem Mohammad Yaseen Shah
- Saif Ud Din Bhat
