= Banihal Assembly constituency =

Constituency of the Jammu and Kashmir Legislative Assembly

Coordinates: 33.438°N 75.195°E

Banihal
- Constituency No. 55 for the Jammu and Kashmir Legislative Assembly

Constituency details
- Country: India
- State: Jammu and Kashmir
- District: Ramban
- Lok Sabha constituency: Udhampur
- Established: 1967

Member of Legislative Assembly
- Incumbent Sajad Shaheen
- Party: Jammu and Kashmir National Conference
- Elected year: 2024

Banihal Assembly constituency is one of the 90 constituencies in the Jammu and Kashmir Legislative Assembly of Jammu and Kashmir a north state of India. Banihal is also part of Udhampur Lok Sabha constituency.

== Members of the Legislative Assembly ==
Election	Member	Party
1967	M. Akhtar	Jammu & Kashmir National Conference
1972	Hajra Begum	Indian National Congress
1977	Molvi Abdul Rashid	Jammu & Kashmir National Conference
1983	Abdul Rashid	Jammu & Kashmir National Conference
1987	Molvi Abdul Rashid	Jammu & Kashmir National Conference
1996	Mohammed Farooq Mir	Independent politician
2002	Molvi Abdul Rashid	Independent politician
2008	Vikar Rasool Wani	Indian National Congress
2014	Vikar Rasool Wani	Indian National Congress
2024	Sajad Shaheen	Jammu and Kashmir National Conference

== Election results ==
=== Assembly Election 2024 ===
2024 Jammu and Kashmir Legislative Assembly election : Banihal
Party	Candidate	Votes	%	±%
JKNC	Sajad Shaheen	33,128	36.37%	New
JKPDP	Imtiaz Ahmed Shan	27,018	29.66%	▲6.56
INC	Vikar Rasool Wani	20,458	22.46%	▼8.18
BJP	Mohammed Saleem Bhat	6,285	6.90%	▼10.22
NOTA	None of the Above	1,631	1.79%	▼2.38
Independent	Munazar Ahmed Malik	1,071	1.18%	New
Independent	Bashir Ahmed Shan	837	0.92%	New
AAP	Mudassir Azmat	654	0.72%	New
Margin of victory		6,110	6.71%	▼0.83
Turnout		91,082	72.23%	▼1.14
Registered electors		1,26,096		▲60.45
JKNC gain from INC		Swing	▲5.73	

=== Assembly Election 2014 ===
2014 Jammu and Kashmir Legislative Assembly election : Banihal
Party	Candidate	Votes	%	±%
INC	Vikar Rasool Wani	17,671	30.65%	▲13.27
JKPDP	Bashir Ahmed Runyal	13,322	23.10%	▲18.64
JKNC	Sajad Shaheen	13,002	22.55%	▲12.99
BJP	Showket Javeed Daing	9,874	17.12%	▲10.03
NOTA	None of the Above	2,405	4.17%	New
JKNPP	Sewa Singh Bali	733	1.27%	New
BSP	Mohammed Ali	656	1.14%	New
Margin of victory		4,349	7.54%	▲1.18
Turnout		57,663	73.37%	▲5.44
Registered electors		78,588		▲11.97
INC hold		Swing	▲13.27	

=== Assembly Election 2008 ===
2008 Jammu and Kashmir Legislative Assembly election : Banihal
Party	Candidate	Votes	%	±%
INC	Vikar Rasool Wani	8,287	17.38%	▼0.51
Independent	Showket Javeed Daing	5,254	11.02%	New
Independent	Molvi Abdul Rashid	4,960	10.40%	New
JKNC	Sajad Shaheen	4,558	9.56%	▼10.12
Independent	Imtiyaz Ahmed	3,763	7.89%	New
BJP	Rajiv	3,383	7.09%	New
Independent	Mohammed Farooq Mir	2,741	5.75%	New
Independent	Om Parkash	2,612	5.48%	New
LJP	Mohammed Saleem Bhat	2,160	4.53%	New
JKPDP	Bashir Ahmed Runyal	2,130	4.47%	▲1.39
Independent	Farooq Ahmed Mir	1,584	3.32%	New
Margin of victory		3,033	6.36%	▼21.47
Turnout		47,683	67.94%	▲27.39
Registered electors		70,186		▲18.68
INC gain from Independent		Swing	▼30.13	

=== Assembly Election 2002 ===
2002 Jammu and Kashmir Legislative Assembly election : Banihal
Party	Candidate	Votes	%	±%
Independent	Molvi Abdul Rashid	11,393	47.51%	New
JKNC	Mohammed Farooq Mir	4,719	19.68%	▼13.56
INC	Mohammed Ayub Khan	4,289	17.89%	▲13.17
BSP	Mohammed Yousuf	1,012	4.22%	▲2.54
Independent	Abdul Aziz	767	3.20%	New
JKPDP	Bashir Ahmed Runyal	737	3.07%	New
JKNPP	Peer Abdul Majeed	489	2.04%	New
Independent	Gazanfar Ali	460	1.92%	New
Margin of victory		6,674	27.83%	▲14.38
Turnout		23,980	40.55%	▼10.77
Registered electors		59,137		▲29.70
Independent hold		Swing	▲0.82	

=== Assembly Election 1996 ===
1996 Jammu and Kashmir Legislative Assembly election : Banihal
Party	Candidate	Votes	%	±%
Independent	Mohammed Farooq Mir	10,925	46.69%	New
JKNC	Molvi Abdul Rashid	7,778	33.24%	▼24.68
BJP	Abdul Aziz	2,084	8.91%	New
INC	Hamidullah Khan	1,104	4.72%	New
JD	Abdul Samad	527	2.25%	New
BSP	Abdul Rashid	393	1.68%	New
Independent	Balbir Singh	313	1.34%	New
Independent	Abdul Latif	154	0.66%	New
Margin of victory		3,147	13.45%	▼19.33
Turnout		23,401	52.26%	▼10.68
Registered electors		45,595		▲17.39
Independent gain from JKNC		Swing	▼11.23	

=== Assembly Election 1987 ===
1987 Jammu and Kashmir Legislative Assembly election : Banihal
Party	Candidate	Votes	%	±%
JKNC	Molvi Abdul Rashid	13,949	57.92%	▼5.75
Independent	Mohammed Akhter Nizam	6,056	25.15%	New
Independent	Abdul Ahad Malik	2,743	11.39%	New
Independent	Mohammed Ali	698	2.90%	New
Independent	Abdul Majid	469	1.95%	New
JP	Khadim Hussain	168	0.70%	New
Margin of victory		7,893	32.77%	▼2.03
Turnout		24,083	64.32%	▼3.74
Registered electors		38,840		▲8.06
JKNC hold		Swing	▼5.75	

=== Assembly Election 1983 ===
1983 Jammu and Kashmir Legislative Assembly election : Banihal
Party	Candidate	Votes	%	±%
JKNC	Abdul Rashid	15,046	63.67%	▲11.84
INC	Sona Ullah	6,821	28.87%	▲6.01
Independent	Abdul Samad	1,246	5.27%	New
Independent	Abdul Hameed	328	1.39%	New
Independent	Abdul Latif	189	0.80%	New
Margin of victory		8,225	34.81%	▲5.84
Turnout		23,630	67.42%	▲15.10
Registered electors		35,942		▲26.47
JKNC hold		Swing	▲11.84	

=== Assembly Election 1977 ===
1977 Jammu and Kashmir Legislative Assembly election : Banihal
Party	Candidate	Votes	%	±%
JKNC	Molvi Abdul Rashid	7,460	51.83%	New
INC	Modh. Akthar Nizami	3,290	22.86%	New
JP	Sanaullah	2,279	15.83%	New
Independent	Abdul Khaliq	403	2.80%	New
JI	Ahdullah Malik	355	2.47%	New
Independent	Abdul Rashid Mushtaq	330	2.29%	New
Independent	Des Raj	162	1.13%	New
Independent	Mohammed Yassin	114	0.79%	New
Margin of victory		4,170	28.97%	
Turnout		14,393	52.67%	▲50.65
Registered electors		28,419		▲9.99
JKNC gain from INC		Swing		

=== Assembly Election 1972 ===
1972 Jammu and Kashmir Legislative Assembly election : Banihal
Party	Candidate	Votes	%	±%
INC	Hajra Begum	Unopposed		
Registered electors		25,837		▲5.07
INC gain from JKNC		Swing		

=== Assembly Election 1967 ===
1967 Jammu and Kashmir Legislative Assembly election : Banihal
Party	Candidate	Votes	%	±%
JKNC	M. Akhtar	7,570	54.22%	New
INC	Assadullah	6,391	45.78%	New
Margin of victory		1,179	8.44%	
Turnout		13,961	58.46%	
Registered electors		24,590		
JKNC win (new seat)				

== See also ==
- Banihal
- List of constituencies of Jammu and Kashmir Legislative Assembly
