= Vikar Rasool Wani =

Indian politician

President Jammu and Kashmir Congress Committee
- In office 16 August 2022 – 16 August 2024
- Preceded by: Ghulam Ahmad Mir
- Succeeded by: Tariq Hameed Karra

Member of Jammu and Kashmir Legislative Assembly
- In office 2008–2014
- Preceded by: Molvi Abdul Rashid
- Constituency: Banihal
- In office 2014–2018
- Succeeded by: Sajad Shaheen
- Constituency: Banihal

Personal details
- Born: Banihal, Jammu and Kashmir
- Party: Indian National Congress

Vikar Rasool Wani is an Indian politician from Jammu and Kashmir. He represented Banihal Assembly constituency in the state of Jammu and Kashmir from 2008 till 2018. Wani had served as the President of Jammu Kashmir Pradesh Congress Committee from August 2022 to August 2024.

Wani began his political career when he won a councillor seat from Banihal in the municipal elections. He was later named as a candidate for the 2008 Jammu and Kashmir Legislative Assembly election. He won from Banihal constituency twice, in the 2008 and 2014 elections in the state. In the 2024 assembly elections, Wani lost to Sajad Shaheen of National Conference by a margin of 6,110 votes.

== Electoral performance ==
Election	Constituency	Party	Result	Votes %	Opposition Candidate	Opposition Party	Opposition vote %	Ref
2024	Banihal	INC	Lost	22.46%	Sajad Shaheen	JKNC	36.37%	
2014	Banihal	INC	Won	30.65%	Bashir Ahmed Runyal	JKPDP	23.10%	
2008	Banihal	INC	Won	17.38%	Showket Javeed Daing	Independent	11.02%	
