= Mirza Mehboob Beg =

Former Cabinet Minister

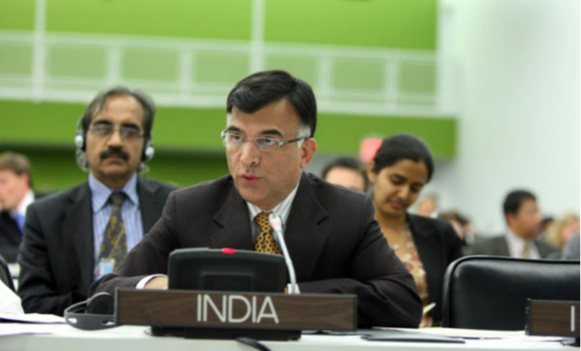
- MP Dr Mirza Mehboob Beg representing India at the United Nations

Cabinet Minister for Health, Family Welfare and Medical Education
- In office 1984-1987

Member of Jammu and Kashmir Legislative Assembly
- In office 1983 - 1987
- Constituency: Anantnag (Vidhan Sabha constituency)
- In office 2002-2008
- Constituency: Anantnag (Vidhan Sabha constituency)

President, Kashmir JKNC
- In office 2003-2009

Member of Jammu and Kashmir Legislative Council
- In office March 2009 - May 2009

Member of Indian Parliament, Lok Sabha
- In office 2009 - 2014
- Constituency: Anantnag (Lok Sabha constituency)

General Secretary (Org.), Jammu and Kashmir Peoples Democratic Party
- In office 2021-present

Vice President, Indo-Botswana Parliamentary Friendship
- In office 2009-2014

President FAKHR-E-KASHMIR Mirza Mohammad Afzal Beg Memorial Trust
- In office 2010-present

Personal details
- Born: 4 September 1949 (age 76) Sarnal, Anantnag district, Kashmir
- Party: Jammu and Kashmir Peoples Democratic Party
- Spouse: Nighat Beg
- Parent: Mirza Afzal Beg
- Profession: Politician

Mirza Mehboob Beg (born 4 September 1949) is a veteran Indian politician from Jammu and Kashmir, belonging to the Peoples' Democratic Party (PDP) and currently serving as its General Secretary(Organisation). Beg has been elected to the Jammu and Kashmir Legislative Assembly, Legislative Council and the Indian Parliament various times . He has also served as the Cabinet Minister for Health, Family Welfare and Medical Education .

== Early life ==
Mirza Mehboob Beg was born in Sarnal, Anantnag district. He is the son of Mirza Afzal Beg, widely known as Fakhr-e-Kashmir (Pride of Jammu and Kashmir), who had served as the first Deputy Chief Minister of Jammu and Kashmir.

Mehboob Beg studied MBBS from Srinagar Medical College and resides at Srinagar.

== Career ==
Beg contested his first Legislative Assembly election from Anantnag in 1983 and won it with a clear majority, becoming an MLA for the first time. In 1984 he was inducted as a Cabinet Minister for Health, Medical Education and Family Welfare. He received a letter of appreciation from UNICEF for his work as Health Minister. He is known for creating jobs in South Kashmir.

He then contested 1996 and 2002 assembly elections, and in the 2002 election received 71% of the total votes polled. He served as the Provincial President of Jammu & Kashmir National Conference for Kashmir during 2003–2009. He received the Best Leader award from Jammu and Kashmir Police in 2006. He got elected to the Jammu and Kashmir Legislative Council in March 2009.

In May 2009 Beg won the Parliamentary Elections from Anantnag and got elected to the Indian Parliament. His victory stunned political observers as he pulled off a victory in the parliamentary polls despite the fact that the seat was a PDP Bastion, with NC having only 1 MLA in South Kashmir. Many Political Experts believe only he could have pulled-off a victory in the Parliamentary Polls as 12 out of the 16 assembly seats in the Anantnag Parliamentary Constituency were held by the opposition, PDP, despite this Bég pulled off a famous win . It was widely reported that he was to be given Home Ministry in 2009 . He held the positions of Chairman of the Vigilance and Monitoring Committee for Health and Family Welfare, as well as Chairman of the Vigilance and Monitoring Committee for Rural Development Programmes and was the Vice President of Indo-Botswana Parliamentary Friendship. During his tenure as Member of the Lok Sabha he also served as the Member of the Standing Committee on Oil, Petroleum and Natural Gas. On 23 September 2012, he became a Member of the Rules Committee. In 2012, he also served as a Member of the National Level Selection Committee for the National Awards to Micro, Small, and Medium Enterprises. He also represented India at the United Nations.

Beg has received Bharat Gaurav Award in the field of politics. He also received Best Legislator award. He is a well known face in the Indian media. He also served as the President of the Jammu and Kashmir Handball Association.

On 16 November 2014 Bég withdrew his candidature for Jammu and Kashmir Assembly Elections from Anantnag constituency and announced his support for PDP Patron Mufti Mohammad Sayeed. In 2015 he joined PDP and was appointed as the Chief Spokesperson of the party. In 2021, he became the General Secretary (Organisation) of the Party . He is the President of FAKHR-E-Kashmir Mirza Mohammad Afzal Beg Memorial Trust. On 2 September 2023 he was inducted in the Campaign Committee of the Indian National Developmental Inclusive Alliance(INDIA Alliance). On 14 November 2024 he was appointed as the Chief Spokesperson of Jammu and Kashmir People's Democratic Party.
