= Peerzada Mohammad Syed =

Indian politician

Member of Jammu and Kashmir Legislative Assembly
- Incumbent
- Assumed office 8 October 2024
- Preceded by: Mehbooba Mufti
- Constituency: Anantnag

Personal details
- Party: Indian National Congress
- Profession: Politician

Peerzada Mohammad Syed is an Indian politician from Jammu & Kashmir. He is a Member of the Jammu & Kashmir Legislative Assembly from 2024, representing Anantnag Assembly constituency as a Member of the Indian National Congress party. Previously, he served as an MLA, elected in the 1987, 2002 and 2008 elections from Kokernag Assembly constituency.

== Electoral performance ==
Election	Constituency	Party	Result	Votes %	Opposition Candidate	Opposition Party	Opposition vote %	Ref
2024	Anantnag	INC	Won	23.77%	Mehboob Beg	JKPDP	17.77%	
2014	Kokernag	INC	Lost	34.33%	Abdul Rahim Rather	JKPDP	42.30%	
2008	Kokernag	INC	Won	26.75%	Ghulam Nabi Bhat	JKNC	24.21%	
2002	Kokernag	INC	Won	38.06%	Ghulam Rasool Malik	JKPDP	33.12%	
1996	Kokernag	INC	Lost	15.59%	Syed Abdul Rashid	JKNC	49.88%	
1987	Kokernag	INC	Won	80.92%	Mohammed Abdulla Sheikh	Independent	13.58%	

== See also ==
- 2024 Jammu & Kashmir Legislative Assembly election
- Jammu and Kashmir Legislative Assembly
