= Anantnag Assembly constituency =

Constituency of the Jammu and Kashmir legislative assembly in India

Coordinates: 33.732°N 75.149°E

Anantnag
- Constituency No. 44 for the Jammu and Kashmir Legislative Assembly

Constituency details
- Country: India
- State: Jammu and Kashmir
- District: Anantnag
- Lok Sabha constituency: Anantnag - Rajouri
- Established: 1951

Member of Legislative Assembly
- Incumbent Peerzada Mohammad Syed
- Party: INC
- Elected year: 2024

Anantnag Assembly constituency is one of the 90 constituencies in the Jammu and Kashmir Legislative Assembly of Jammu and Kashmir a north state of India.

In 2008 Jammu and Kashmir Legislative Assembly election, Mufti Mohammad Sayeed of Jammu and Kashmir Peoples Democratic Party won the seat and retained it in 2014 and became Chief Ministers of Jammu and Kashmir. In 1977 Mirza Afzal Beg won the seat and became the first Deputy Chief Minister of Jammu and Kashmir. His son Mirza Mehboob Beg won this seat twice in 1983 and 2002. Mirza Mehboob Beg also served as the Health Minister.

== Member of Legislative Assembly ==
| Year | Member | Party |
|---|---|---|
| 1951 | Mirza Afzal Beg | Jammu and Kashmir National Conference |
| 1962 | Khwaja Shams-ud-Din | Indian National Congress |
| 1967 | Khwaja Shams-ud-Din | Indian National Congress |
| 1972 | Khwaja Shams-ud-Din | Indian National Congress |
| 1974 (Note: by-election) | Mirza Afzal Beg | Jammu and Kashmir National Conference |
| 1977 | Mirza Afzal Beg | Jammu and Kashmir National Conference |
| 1983 | Mirza Mehboob Beg | Jammu and Kashmir National Conference |
| 1987 | Muhammad Sayeed Shah | Independent politician |
| 1996 | Safdar Ali Beg | Jammu and Kashmir National Conference |
| 2002 | Mirza Mehboob Beg | Jammu and Kashmir National Conference |
| 2008 | Mufti Mohammad Sayeed | Jammu and Kashmir Peoples Democratic Party |
| 2014 | Mufti Mohammad Sayeed | Jammu and Kashmir Peoples Democratic Party |
| 2016 (Note: by-election) | Mehbooba Mufti | Jammu and Kashmir Peoples Democratic Party |
| 2024 | Peerzada Mohammad Syed | Indian National Congress |

== Election results ==
=== 2024 ===
2024 Jammu and Kashmir Legislative Assembly election: Anantnag
| Party | Candidate | Votes | % | ±% |
|---|---|---|---|---|
| INC | Peerzada Mohammad Syed | 6,679 | 23.77 | ▲3.78 |
| JKPDP | Mirza Mehboob Beg | 4,993 | 17.77 | ▼45.24 |
| JKAP | Hilal Ahmad Shah | 4,245 | 15.11 | N/A |
| Independent | Mansoor Hussain Soharvardi | 4,047 | 14.40 | N/A |
| DPAP | Mir Altaf Hussain | 2,331 | 8.30 | New |
| Independent | Mohd Asif Bhat | 1,930 | 6.87 | N/A |
| BJP | Syed Wajahat Hussain | 1,508 | 5.37 | N/A |
| NOTA | None of the Above | 640 | 2.28 | N/A |
| Independent | Tawseef Nisar | 560 | 1.99 | N/A |
| Independent | Javaid Ahmad Rather | 236 | 0.84 | N/A |
| Independent | Bilal Ahmad Mir | 209 | 0.74 | N/A |
| RLJP | Sanjay Saraf | 161 | 0.57 | N/A |
| JKANC | Rafiq Ahmed Kunroo | 155 | 0.55 | N/A |
| Margin of victory | | 1,686 | 6.00 | ▼36.47 |
| Turnout | | 28,096 | 46.01 | ▲12.18 |
| INC gain from JKPDP | | Swing | | |

=== 2016 bye-election ===
Bye-election, 2016: Anantnag
| Party | Candidate | Votes | % | ±% |
|---|---|---|---|---|
| JKPDP | Mehbooba Mufti | 17,701 | 63.01 | ▲9.71 |
| INC | Hilal Ahmad Shah | 5,616 | 19.99 | ▼13.04 |
| Margin of victory | | 12,085 | 42.47 | ▲24.13 |
| Turnout | | 28,458 | 33.83 | ▼5.88 |
| JKPDP hold | | Swing | | |

=== 2014 ===
2014 Jammu and Kashmir Legislative Assembly election: Anantnag
| Party | Candidate | Votes | % | ±% |
|---|---|---|---|---|
| JKPDP | Mufti Mohammad Sayeed | 16,983 | 51.30 | |
| INC | Hilal Ahmad Shah | 10,955 | 33.03 | |
| Margin of victory | | 6,088 | 18.34 | |
| Turnout | | 33,200 | 39.71 | |
| JKPDP hold | | Swing | | |

== See also ==
- Anantnag
- List of constituencies of Jammu and Kashmir Legislative Assembly
