= Kokernag Assembly constituency =

Constituency of the Jammu and Kashmir Legislative Assembly

Coordinates: 33.58°N 75.32°E

Kokernag
- Constituency No. 42 for the Jammu and Kashmir Legislative Assembly

Constituency details
- Country: India
- State: Jammu and Kashmir
- District: Pulwama
- Lok Sabha constituency: Anantnag-Rajouri
- Established: 1977
- Reservation: ST

Member of Legislative Assembly
- Incumbent Zafar Ali Khatana
- Party: Jammu and Kashmir National Conference
- Elected year: 2024

Kokernag Assembly constituency is one of the 90 constituencies in the Legislative Assembly of Jammu and Kashmir, a northern Union Territory of India. Kokernag is also part of Anantnag-Rajouri Lok Sabha constituency.

== Members of the Legislative Assembly ==
Election	Member	Party
1977	Malik Ghulam Ud Din	Jammu and Kashmir National Conference
1983	Malik Ghulam Ud Din	Jammu and Kashmir National Conference
1987	Peerzada Mohammad Syed	Indian National Congress
1996	Syed Abdul Rashid	Jammu and Kashmir National Conference
2002	Peerzada Mohammad Syed	Indian National Congress
2008	Peerzada Mohammad Syed	Indian National Congress
2014	Abdul Rahim Rather	Jammu and Kashmir Peoples Democratic Party
2024	Zafar Ali Khatana	Jammu and Kashmir National Conference

== Election results ==
=== Assembly Election 2024 ===
2024 Jammu and Kashmir Legislative Assembly election : Kokernag
Party	Candidate	Votes	%	±%
JKNC	Zafar Ali Khatana	17,949	31.23%	New
JKPDP	Haroon Rashid Khatana	11,787	20.51%	▼21.79
Independent	Gulzar Ahmad Khatana	8,066	14.03%	New
Independent	Anwar Jaan	6,977	12.14%	New
BJP	Roshan Hussain Khan Gojar	4,173	7.26%	▲4.05
Independent	Dr Ishfaq Ahmed Chodhary	3,007	5.23%	New
Independent	Bashir Ahmad Khari	1,628	2.83%	New
NOTA	None of the Above	1,561	2.72%	▲1.05
Margin of victory		6,162	10.72%	▲2.76
Turnout		57,477	62.97%	▼3.16
Registered electors		91,280		▲5.13
JKNC gain from JKPDP		Swing	▼11.07	

=== Assembly Election 2014 ===
2014 Jammu and Kashmir Legislative Assembly election : Kokernag
Party	Candidate	Votes	%	±%
JKPDP	Abdul Rahim Rather	24,284	42.30%	▲23.86
INC	Peerzada Mohammad Syed	19,713	34.33%	▲7.58
JKNC	Ghulam Nabi Bhat	8,248	14.37%	▼9.85
BJP	Khurshid Ahmad Malik	1,842	3.21%	New
Independent	Ghulam Hassan Khanday	1,131	1.97%	New
JKNPP	Mohammad Yousuf Ganie	790	1.38%	New
All Jammu and Kashmir Republican Party	Javaid Ahmad Rather	451	0.79%	New
NOTA	None of the Above	956	1.67%	New
Margin of victory		4,571	7.96%	▲5.42
Turnout		57,415	66.13%	▼4.22
Registered electors		86,825		▲22.09
JKPDP gain from INC		Swing	▲15.54	

=== Assembly Election 2008 ===
2008 Jammu and Kashmir Legislative Assembly election : Kokernag
Party	Candidate	Votes	%	±%
INC	Peerzada Mohammad Syed	13,384	26.75%	▼11.31
JKNC	Ghulam Nabi Bhat	12,114	24.21%	▲13.72
JKPDP	Sehar Iqbal	9,223	18.43%	▼14.68
Jammu & Kashmir Democratic Party Nationalist	Abdul Salam Reshi	5,858	11.71%	New
Independent	Abdul Rahim Rather	2,714	5.42%	New
JKANC	Ghulam Rasool Malik	1,352	2.70%	New
People's Democratic Front (Jammu and Kashmir)	Bashir Ahmad Ahanger	978	1.95%	New
Margin of victory		1,270	2.54%	▼2.41
Turnout		50,030	70.35%	▲55.08
Registered electors		71,118		▲23.16
INC hold		Swing	▼11.31	

=== Assembly Election 2002 ===
2002 Jammu and Kashmir Legislative Assembly election : Kokernag
Party	Candidate	Votes	%	±%
INC	Peerzada Mohammad Syed	3,356	38.06%	▲22.47
JKPDP	Ghulam Rasool Malik	2,920	33.12%	New
JKNC	Syed Abdul Rashid	925	10.49%	▼39.39
BJP	Showket Hussain Wani	579	6.57%	▲3.95
LJP	Peerzada Abdul Hameed	401	4.55%	New
Independent	Mohammed Iqbal Wani	252	2.86%	New
Independent	Fayaz Ahmed Wani	247	2.80%	New
Margin of victory		436	4.94%	▼26.85
Turnout		8,817	15.27%	▼23.77
Registered electors		57,743		▼1.69
INC gain from JKNC		Swing	▼11.82	

=== Assembly Election 1996 ===
1996 Jammu and Kashmir Legislative Assembly election : Kokernag
Party	Candidate	Votes	%	±%
JKNC	Syed Abdul Rashid	11,436	49.88%	New
JKAL	Abdul Rashid Rather	4,145	18.08%	New
INC	Peerzada Mohammad Syed	3,575	15.59%	▼65.32
JD	Peerzada Abdul Hameed	1,930	8.42%	New
JKNPP	Yousuf	810	3.53%	New
BJP	Ghulam Mohmad Tantray	601	2.62%	New
AIIC(T)	Mohammed Yasin Hadi	431	1.88%	New
Margin of victory		7,291	31.80%	▼35.53
Turnout		22,928	39.03%	▼47.73
Registered electors		58,733		▲44.88
JKNC gain from INC		Swing	▼31.04	

=== Assembly Election 1987 ===
1987 Jammu and Kashmir Legislative Assembly election : Kokernag
Party	Candidate	Votes	%	±%
INC	Peerzada Mohammad Syed	28,463	80.92%	▲41.52
Independent	Mohammed Abdulla Sheikh	4,778	13.58%	New
CPI(M)	Ghulam Nabi Bhat	1,349	3.84%	New
Independent	Rashid Khan	500	1.42%	New
Margin of victory		23,685	67.33%	▲46.12
Turnout		35,176	87.95%	▲9.86
Registered electors		40,540		▲10.43
INC gain from JKNC		Swing	▲20.31	

=== Assembly Election 1983 ===
1983 Jammu and Kashmir Legislative Assembly election : Kokernag
Party	Candidate	Votes	%	±%
JKNC	Malik Ghulam Ud Din	17,112	60.61%	▼4.91
INC	Peer Hissam Ud Din	11,123	39.39%	▲15.85
Margin of victory		5,989	21.21%	▼20.76
Turnout		28,235	80.20%	▲6.51
Registered electors		36,711		▲14.00
JKNC hold		Swing		

=== Assembly Election 1977 ===
1977 Jammu and Kashmir Legislative Assembly election : Kokernag
Party	Candidate	Votes	%	±%
JKNC	Malik Ghulam Ud Din	14,854	65.52%	New
INC	Peer Hissam Ud Din	5,339	23.55%	New
JP	Chaudri Mohammed Shafi	2,479	10.93%	New
Margin of victory		9,515	41.97%	
Turnout		22,672	74.91%	
Registered electors		32,202		
JKNC win (new seat)				

== See also ==
- Kokernag
- List of constituencies of Jammu and Kashmir Legislative Assembly
