= 2014 Kashmir Valley attacks =

2014 terrorist attack in Kashmir

December 2014 Kashmir attacks
- Part of Insurgency in Jammu and Kashmir
- Location: Jammu and Kashmir, India
- Date: 5 December 2014
- Weapons: AK-47, shotguns, grenades
- Deaths: 23 including 6 perpetrators
- Injuries: 10+
- Perpetrator: Lashkar-e-Taiba
- Motive: To disrupt ongoing assembly elections

On 5 December 2014, there were four different terror attacks at multiple places in the Kashmir Valley of the state of Jammu and Kashmir in India.

== Background ==
Elections to the state assembly of Jammu and Kashmir were going on and heavy voter turnout was recorded in the first two phases. The third phase of the election were due to be held in few days. Indian Prime Minister Narendra Modi was due to hold two election rally, in Srinagar and Anantnag. The attacks were carried out just three days before the rally to disrupt the election.

== Attacks ==
Six terrorists attacked the Indian Army camp at Mohura in Uri. They attacked at 3:10 am IST on 5 December 2014. Soon the army retaliated. Eight army soldiers, including a Lieutenant-Colonel Sankalp Kumar of Punjab Regiment, three Jammu and Kashmir policemen and all the six terrorists were killed totalling to 17 people.

Two militants attacked state police at a temporary checkpoint in Ahmadnagar near Srinagar around 1:15 pm IST. They were killed and one of them was identified as Qari Asrar, the district commander of the Lashkar-e-Taiba.

Two grenade attacks, in Shopian district around 1.30 pm IST and the other in Tral of Pulwama district around 2 pm, were also carried out. There was no fatalities in Shopian whereas in Tral two civilians died and nine injured when the grenade blasted at the bus stand.
