= Abdul Rahim Rather (born 1957) =

Indian politician

Abdul Rahim Rather (born 1957) is an Indian politician from Jammu and Kashmir. He was an MLA from Kokernag Assembly constituency in Anantnag district. He won the 2014 Jammu and Kashmir Legislative Assembly election representing the Jammu and Kashmir People's Democratic Party. Before April 2021, he joined Apni party.

== Early life and education ==
Rather is from Nagam, Kokernag, Anantnag district, Jammu and Kashmir. He is the son of Mohamad Ahsan Rather. He completed his B.Sc. in 1978 at Government Boys Degree College, Anantnag.

== Electoral performance ==
Election	Constituency	Party	Result	Votes %	Opposition Candidate	Opposition Party	Opposition vote %	Ref
2014	Kokernag	JKPDP	Won	42.30%	Peerzada Mohammad Syed	INC	34.33%	

== Career ==
Rather won the Kokernag Assembly constituency representing Jammu and Kashmir People's Democratic Party in the 2014 Jammu and Kashmir Legislative Assembly election. He polled 24,284 votes and defeated his nearest rival, Peerzada Mohammad Syed of Indian National Congress, by a margin of 4,571 votes.
