= Bali Bhagat =

Indian politician

Hon'ble Minister for Health and Medical Education.Government of Jammu and Kashmir
- In office 1 March 2015 – 30 April 2018

Personal details
- Party: Bharatiya Janata Party

Bali Bhagat is an Indian politician from Jammu & Kashmir. He is a former member of legislative assembly from Raipur-Domana constituency and a Former Minister of Government of Jammu and Kashmir and member of the BJP.

== Career ==
In 1996, he was elected from Doda district's (now Ramban) Ramban assembly constituency of J & K. He served as Minister for Forest, Social Welfare, Ecology & Environment in BJP-PDP Coalition government for 9 months. He served as Health Minister in BJP-PDP Coalition government from April 2016 to April 2018.

He laid the foundation stone of Bone & Joint Hospital in Jammu Division. He is credited with the re-establishment of Govt. Ayurvedic College In Jammu Division after a gap of 40 years.

== Electoral performance ==
Election	Constituency	Party	Result	Votes %	Opposition Candidate	Opposition Party	Opposition vote %	Ref
2014	Raipur Domana	BJP	Won	66.99%	Mulla Ram	INC	23.17%	
2008	Ramban	BJP	Lost	22.88%	Ashok Kumar	INC	43.47%	
2002	Ramban	BJP	Lost	28.63%	Chaman Lal	JKNC	36.12%	
1996	Ramban	BJP	Won	46.78%	Suram Chand	JKNC	38.32%	
