= Jagdish Raj Dubey =

Indian politician

Member of the Jammu and Kashmir Legislative Assembly
- Constituency: Bishnah

Personal details
- Party: Janata Dal
- Occupation: Politician

Jagdish Raj Dubey is an Indian politician and member of the Janata Dal. Dubey is a member of the Jammu and Kashmir Legislative Assembly from the Bishnah constituency in Jammu district.

== Electoral performance ==
Election	Constituency	Party	Result	Votes %	Opposition Candidate	Opposition Party	Opposition vote %	Ref
2002	Bishnah	INC	Lost	15.06%	Ashwani Kumar Sharma	Independent	32.72%	
1996	Bishnah	JD	Won	26.43%	Hari Chand	BSP	21.88%	
