= Aijaz Ahmad Mir =

Indian politician

Jammu and Kashmir Legislative Assembly
- Succeeded by: Constituency abolished
- Constituency: Wachi

Personal details
- Born: 16 November 1986 (age 39) Zanipora, Shopian, Jammu and Kashmir
- Party: Jammu and Kashmir Peoples Democratic Party

Aijaz Ahmad Mir is an Indian politician and the former member of Jammu and Kashmir Legislative Assembly who represented Wachi assembly constituency of the Jammu and Kashmir (state). He is affiliated with Jammu and Kashmir Peoples Democratic Party.

Aijaz Ahmed Mir belongs to a well-known and prominent political family of Wachi in Shopian. His father, who served as an MLA migrated from Zainapora to Srinagar MLA hostel in 1993-94. He was a holding a political post in National Conference party.

Prior to entering into politics, his father was in the business of running a Rice mill and brand saw. He contested 1996 elections as NC Candidate and won by a huge majority.

When his father died in 1999, Aijaz Ahmed Mir was studying in class 7th in DBN school Jammu. He came back to Kashmir and joined school at Govt Higher Secondary School Zainapora, where he completed his 12th and later did his graduation (BSC in Seed Technology) from Degree College Anantnag.

After that he joined Kashmir University in 2008 and completed his LLB from the varsity in 2011.

In the same year, he contested Panchayat elections and won the election as Sarpanch from Halqa Panchayat Zainapora and thereby becoming the youngest Sarpanch in the history of erstwhile state of Jammu and Kashmir. Later he was also elected as president jammu and Kashmir panch and sarpanch united forum where he worked tirelessly for empowerment of PRIs in jammu and Kashmir.

In 2014, Aijaz formally joined Jammu and Kashmir Peoples Democratic Party and subsequently contested legislative assembly elections wherein he emerged victorious.

He was the third youngest MLA elected to the J&K legislative assembly, after Sakina itoo and Yawar Dilawar Mir.

He lost in 2024.

== Arrests ==
After the abrogation of article 370 in 2019 in Jammu and Kashmir, Mir was sent to jail and was released from detention after more than six months.

== Controversies ==
Aijaz was incriminated by the government officials including Bhartiya Janata Party over referring the Kashmiri militants to "martyrs".

== Security incidents ==
In October 2018, one of Mir's security personnel who was later identified as a militant via Social media videos, fled with weapons including eight AK-47 rifles and one handgun at Jawahar Nagar Srinagar which was the official residence of the legislator.
