= Saif Ud Din Bhat =

Indian politician

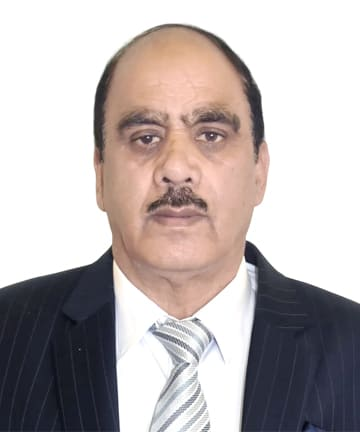

Member of Jammu and Kashmir Legislative Assembly
- Incumbent
- Assumed office 8 October 2024
- Preceded by: Hakeem Mohammad Yaseen Shah
- Constituency: Khan Sahib

Personal details
- Party: Jammu & Kashmir National Conference
- Profession: Politician

Advocate Saif Ud Din Bhat is an Indian politician from Jammu & Kashmir. He is a Member of the Jammu & Kashmir Legislative Assembly from 2024, representing Khan Sahib Assembly constituency as a Member of the Jammu & Kashmir National Conference party. Previously he was elected as MLC (Member of Legislative council) by the PDP-BJP government.

== See also ==
- 2024 Jammu & Kashmir Legislative Assembly election
- Jammu and Kashmir Legislative Assembly
- Hakeem Mohammad Yaseen Shah
