= Mohammad Khalil Naik =

Indian politician

Mohammad Khalil Naik is a Kashmiri politician. He is a veteran leader of the Communist Party of India (Marxist) (CPI(M)) in Jammu & Kashmir. He served as Member of the Jammu & Kashmir Legislative Assembly representing the Wachi constituency 2002–2008. He is also a member of the Jammu & Kashmir State Committee of CPI(M).

Mohammad Khalil Naik won the Wachi seat in 2002, defeating the Jammu & Kashmir People's Democratic Party candidate Ghulam Hassan Bhat by a margin of merely 80 votes. Mohammad Khalil Naik got 4,133 votes (29.19%).

In April–May 2004, during the election campaign ahead of the Lok Sabha parliamentary election (in which fellow CPI(M) leader Mohammed Yousuf Tarigami contested the Anantnag constituency), militants conducted two attempts to kill Mohammad Khalil Naik. On 28 April 2004 militants hurled a grenade at his vehicle near Bungam as he was travelling to an election campaign meeting in Bonapora. The grenade missed the car but injured various bystanders, wounding two policemen and twelve civilians. And on 17 May 2004 Mohammad Khalil Naik's motorcade was attacked at Zainapora in the Shopian area of the Pulwama district. Mohammad Khalil Naik managed to escape unhurt from the attacks.

On 8 August 2007 militants opened fire on Mohammad Khalil Naik's vehicle near Bahibag as the legislator was touring his constituency. Mohammad Khalil Naik and his security team escaped unhurt from the attack.

Mohammad Khalil Naik lost the Wachi seat to J&KPDP leader Mehbooba Mufti in the 2008 Jammu & Kashmir Legislative Assembly election, finishing in fourth place with 2,366 votes (7.01%).
