= Neelam Kumar Langeh =

Kashmiri politician (born 1980)

Neelam Kumar Langeh (born 1980) is an Indian politician from Jammu and Kashmir. He was an MLA from Ramban Assembly constituency which is reserved for Scheduled Caste community in Ramban district. He won the 2014 Jammu and Kashmir Legislative Assembly election representing the Bharatiya Janata Party.

== Early life and education ==
Langeh is from Maitra, Govindpura tehsil, Ramban district, Jammu and Kashmir. He is the son of Rubeela Ram. He completed his Class 12 at J.K. Bose College in 1998 and joined B.A. in a college affiliated with University of Jammu but discontinued his studies.

== Career ==
Langeh won from Ramban Assembly constituency representing the Bharatiya Janata Party in the 2014 Jammu and Kashmir Legislative Assembly election. He polled 25,349 votes and defeated his nearest rival, Chaman Lal of Jammu and Kashmir National Conference, by a margin of 5,364 votes.
