= Nizam Uddin Bhat =

Indian politician

Nizam Ud'din Bhat

Member of the Jammu and Kashmir Legislative Assembly
- Incumbent
- Assumed office 8 October 2024
- Preceded by: Usman Abdul Majid
- Constituency: Bandipora

Chief Whip, Indian National Congress in the Jammu and Kashmir Legislative Assembly
- Incumbent
- Assumed office November 2024

Chairman, Parliamentary Committee, Jammu & Kashmir People's Conference
- In office 2021–2024

Member of the Jammu and Kashmir Legislative Assembly
- In office 2008–2014
- Preceded by: Usman Abdul Majid
- Succeeded by: Usman Abdul Majid
- Constituency: Bandipora

Personal details
- Party: Indian National Congress (2024–present)
- Other political affiliations: Jammu & Kashmir People's Democratic Party (2003–2021)
- Profession: Politician

Nizam Ud'din Bhat is an Indian politician from Jammu & Kashmir. He is a member of the Jammu and Kashmir Legislative Assembly from 2024, representing Bandipora Assembly constituency as a member of the Indian National Congress party.

== See also ==
- 2024 Jammu and Kashmir Legislative Assembly election
- Jammu and Kashmir Legislative Assembly
