= Ashwani Kumar Sharma (Jammu and Kashmir politician) =

Indian politician

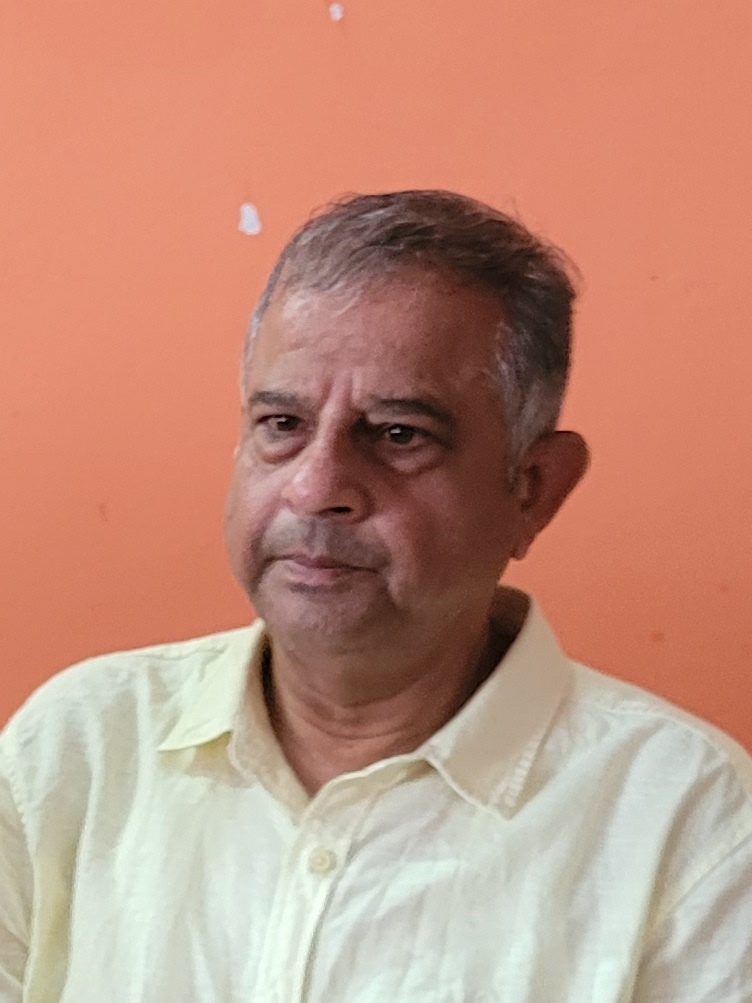
- Ashwani Sharma

Personal details
- Party: Bharatiya Janata Party
- Occupation: Politician

Ashwani Kumar Sharma is an Indian politician and member of the Bharatiya Janata Party. Sharma was a member of the Jammu and Kashmir Legislative Assembly from the Bishnah constituency in Jammu district as Independent candidates.

== Electoral performance ==
Election	Constituency	Party	Result	Votes %	Opposition Candidate	Opposition Party	Opposition vote %	Ref
2014	Bishnah	BJP	Lost	37.39%	Kamal Verma	JKNC	41.62%	
2008	Bishnah	Independent	Won	22.46%	Kamal Verma	BSP	21.68%	
2002	Bishnah	Independent	Won	32.72%	Kamal Verma	JKNC	24.22%	
1996	Bishnah	Independent	Lost	9.32%	Jagdish Raj Dubey	JD	26.43%	
