= Bishnah =

- Town
- Location in Jammu and Kashmir, India Bishnah (India)
- Coordinates: 32.62°N 74.87°E
- Country: India
- Union territory: Jammu and Kashmir
- District: Jammu
- Elevation: 292 m (958 ft)

Population (2001)
  - Total: 116,214

Languages
  - Official: Dogri, Hindi, English, Urdu
- Time zone: UTC+5:30 (IST)
- PIN: 181132
- Telephone code: 01923

Bishnah is a town and a notified area committee in Jammu district in the Indian union territory of Jammu and Kashmir. Ankush Sharma belongs to the same town. He was the winner of Kaun Banega Crorepati Season 12 in the year 2020.

== Geography ==
Bishnah is located at 32.62°N 74.87°E. It Kbc 292 metres (961 feet).

== Demographics ==
Religion in Bishnah town (2011)
1. Hinduism (97.9%)
2. Islam (0.84%)
3. Christianity (0.76%)
4. Sikhism (0.46%)
5. Not Stated (0.07%)

As of 2001 India census, Bishna had a population of 9141. Males constitute 55% of the population and females 45%. Bishna has an average literacy rate of 72%, higher than the national average of 59.5%; with male literacy of 79% and female literacy of 64%. 11% of the population is under 6 years of age.

According to the 2011 census, the town's population is 97.87% Hindu, 0.84% Muslim, 0.76% Christian and 0.46% Sikh.
