= Syed Mohammad Baqir Rizvi =

Indian politician

Member of the Jammu and Kashmir Legislative Assembly
- In office 2014–2017
- Preceded by: Feroz Ahmed Khan
- Succeeded by: Constituency abolished
- Constituency: Zanskar

Minister of State
- In office 2014–2017
- Constituency: Zanskar

Personal details
- Party: Jammu and Kashmir People's Conference
- Other political affiliations: Independent and Bharatiya Janata Party

Syed Mohammad Baqir Rizvi is an Indian politician who has served as a Member of the Jammu and Kashmir Legislative Assembly from the now defunct Zanskar Assembly constituency since 2014 to 2017 being an Independent candidate, later joined Bharatiya Janata Party.

He joined Jammu and Kashmir People's Conference in 2018.
