= Ghulam Hassan Mir =

Indian politician

Cabinet Minister of Government of Jammu and Kashmir
- In office 1984-1986, 2002-2006, 2008-2014

Personal details
- Born: 1 January 1950 Hari Watinoo, Tangmarg, Baramulla district, Jammu and Kashmir
- Party: Jammu and Kashmir Apni Party

Ghulam Hassan Mir is an Indian politician from Jammu and Kashmir, India. He is a member of the Jammu and Kashmir Apni Party. He was the founding member of the Jammu and Kashmir Peoples Democratic Party. He was elected to the Gulmarg constituency of Jammu and Kashmir Legislative Assembly in 2002 as a Jammu and Kashmir Peoples Democratic Party candidate. He was a law minister in the cabinet led by Ghulam Mohammad Shah. He was minister of tourism in the Mufti Mohammad Sayeed led cabinet from 2002 to 2006.
