= Srinagar Lok Sabha constituency =

Lok Sabha constituency in Jammu and Kashmir

Coordinates: 34.1°N 74.8°E

Srinagar JK-2
- Lok Sabha constituency
- Interactive Map Outlining Srinagar Lok Sabha constituency

Constituency details
- Country: India
- Region: North India
- Union Territory: Jammu and Kashmir
- Assembly constituencies: Kangan; Ganderbal; Hazratbal; Lal Chowk; Channapora; Zadibal; Eidgah; Khanyar; Central Shalteng; Habba Kadal; Pampore; Tral; Pulwama; Chadoora; Rajpora; Shopian; Khan Sahib; Charari Sharief
- Established: 1967
- Total electors: 17,47,810
- Reservation: None

Member of Parliament
- 18th Lok Sabha
- Incumbent Vacant

Srinagar Lok Sabha constituency is one of the five Lok Sabha (parliamentary) constituencies in Jammu and Kashmir in northern India.

== Assembly segments ==
Srinagar Lok Sabha constituency is composed of the following assembly segments Assembly Segments

AC No.	AC Name	District	Member	Party
17	Kangan (ST)	Ganderbal	Mian Mehar Ali	JKNC
18	Ganderbal	Ganderbal	Omar Abdullah	JKNC
19	Hazratbal	Srinagar	Salman Sagar	JKNC
20	Khanyar	Srinagar	Ali Mohammad Sagar	JKNC
21	Habba Kadal	Srinagar	Shamim Firdous	JKNC
22	Lal Chowk	Srinagar	Sheikh Ahsan Ahmed	JKNC
23	Channapora	Srinagar	Mushtaq Guroo	JKNC
24	Zadibal	Srinagar	Tanvir Sadiq	JKNC
25	Eidgah	Srinagar	Mubarak Gul	JKNC
26	Central Shalteng	Srinagar	Tariq Hameed Karra	INC
29	Khan Sahib	Budgam	Saif Ud Din Bhat	JKNC
30	Chrar-i-Sharief	Budgam	Abdul Rahim Rather	JKNC
31	Chadoora	Budgam	Ali Mohammad Dar	JKNC
32	Pampore	Pulwama	Hasnain Masoodi	JKNC
33	Tral	Pulwama	Rafiq Ahmad Naik	JKPDP
34	Pulwama	Pulwama	Waheed Ur Rehman Para	JKPDP
35	Rajpora	Pulwama	Ghulam Mohi Uddin Mir	JKNC
37	Shopian	Shopian	Shabir Ahmad Kullay	IND

== Members of Parliament ==
Year	Winner	Party
1967	Bakshi Ghulam Mohammad	Jammu & Kashmir National Conference
1971	S. A. Shamim	Independent
1977	Begum Akbar Jehan Abdullah	Jammu & Kashmir National Conference
1980	Farooq Abdullah	Jammu & Kashmir National Conference
1983^	Abdul Rashid Kabuli	Jammu & Kashmir National Conference
1984	Abdul Rashid Kabuli	Jammu & Kashmir National Conference
1989	Mohammad Shafi Bhat	Jammu & Kashmir National Conference
1996	Ghulam Mohammad Mir Magami	Indian National Congress
1998	Omar Abdullah	Jammu & Kashmir National Conference
1999	Omar Abdullah	Jammu & Kashmir National Conference
2004	Omar Abdullah	Jammu & Kashmir National Conference
2009	Farooq Abdullah	Jammu & Kashmir National Conference
2014	Tariq Hameed Karra	Jammu and Kashmir Peoples Democratic Party
2017^	Farooq Abdullah	Jammu & Kashmir National Conference
2019	Farooq Abdullah	Jammu & Kashmir National Conference
2024	Aga Syed Ruhullah Mehdi	Jammu & Kashmir National Conference
2027^		

^ by poll

== Election results ==
=== General Election, 2024 ===
2024 Indian general elections: Srinagar
Party	Candidate	Votes	%	±%
JKNC	Aga Syed Ruhullah Mehdi	356,866	52.85	▼4.29
JKPDP	Waheed Para	1,68,450	24.95	▲5.31
JKAP	Mohammad Ashraf Mir	65,954	9.77	
NOTA	None of the Above	5,998	0.89	
Majority		1,88,416	27.90	
Turnout		6,75,242	38.49	▲24.06
JKNC hold		Swing		

=== General Election, 2019 ===
Srinagar Lok Sabha seat had 11,06,729 total electorate count in 2009, and that count typically goes up by 35-40% over 10 years in India. Due to the security situation in the valley, there was only 13% voter turn-out in Srinagar seat in May 2019. On the other hand, Udhampur enjoyed voter turn-out of 66% because of the better law and order situation in Jammu area. In 70 polling booths of Srinagar Lok Sabha seat, not a single vote was cast due to the fear of violence.

2019 Indian general elections: Srinagar
Party	Candidate	Votes	%	±%
JKNC	Farooq Abdullah	106,750	57.14	▲3.12
JKPDP	Aga Syed Mohsin	36,700	19.64	▼22.39
JKPC	Irfan Raza Ansari	28,773	15.4	New
BJP	Khalid Jahangir	4,631	2.48	▲1.05
JD(U)	Showkat Hussain Khan	1,250	0.67	New
JKNPP	Abdual Rashid Ganie	791	0.42	New
SS	Abdul Khaliq Bhat	578	0.31	New
NOTA	None of the Above	1,566	0.84	▼0.20
Majority		70,050	37.50	▲25.51
Turnout		1,86,863	14.43	▲7.31
JKNC hold		Swing		

=== 2017 by-election ===
Bye-election, 2017: Srinagar
Party	Candidate	Votes	%	±%
JKNC	Farooq Abdullah	48,555	54.02	▲16.98
JKPDP	Nazir Ahmad Khan	37,779	42.03	▼8.55
IND.	Farooq Ahmad Dar	630	0.70	New
IND.	Mehraj Khourshid Malik	576	0.64	New
AJKLDP	Bikram Singh	496	0.55	New
NOTA	None of the Above	931	1.04	▼0.55
Majority		10,776	11.99	▼1.55
Turnout		89,883	7.12	▼18.74
JKNC gain from JKPDP		Swing	▲3.44	

=== General elections 2014 ===
2014 Indian general elections: Srinagar
Party	Candidate	Votes	%	±%
JKPDP	Tariq Hameed Karra	157,923	50.58	▲9.28
JKNC	Farooq Abdullah	1,15,643	37.04	▼14.96
IND	Aga Syed Mohsin	16,050	5.14	New
BJP	Fayaz Ahmad Bhat	4,467	1.43	▲0.72
AAP	Dr. Raja Muzaffar Bhat	3,271	1.05	New
NOTA	None of the Above	4,979	1.59	New
Majority		42,281	13.54	▲2.84
Turnout		3,12,212	25.86	▲0.31
JKPDP gain from JKNC		Swing	▼1.42	

=== General elections 2009 ===
2009 Indian general elections: Srinagar
Party	Candidate	Votes	%	±%
JKNC	Farooq Abdullah	147,035	52.00	▲1.70
JKPDP	Molvi Iftikhar Hussain Ansari	1,16,793	41.30	▲2.84
BJP	Avtar Kishan Pandita	1,994	0.71	▼0.90
Majority		30,239	10.70	▼1.14
Turnout		2,82,761	25.55	▲6.98
JKNC hold		Swing		

=== General elections 2004 ===
General Election, 2004: Srinagar
Party	Candidate	Votes	%	±%
JKNC	Omar Abdullah	98,422	50.30	
JKPDP	Ghulam Nabi Lone	75,263	38.46	
Independent	Nazir Ahmad Khan	6,873	3.51	
BJP	Iftikhar Sadiq	3,154	1.61	
Majority		23,159	11.84	
Turnout		195,678	18.57	
JKNC hold		Swing		

=== General Election, 1999 ===
1999 Indian general elections: Srinagar
Party	Candidate	Votes	%	±%
JKNC	Omar Abdullah	55,542	57.27	
Independent	Mehbooba Mufti	18,683	19.26	
INC	Aga Syed Mehdi	18,453	19.03	
BJP	Fayaz Ahmad Bhat	2,091	2.16	
RJD	Abul Hassan Bhat	792	0.82	
Independent	Hafiza Bagum	498	0.51	
JKAL	Mohd. Yousuf Shah	310	0.32	
JKNPP	Nazir Ahmad	237	0.24	
SJP(R)	Molvi Habibul Rehman	225	0.23	
Independent	Waheeda Shah	153	0.16	
Majority		36,859	38.01	
Turnout				
JKNC hold		Swing		

=== General Election, 1998 ===
1998 Indian general election: Srinagar
Party	Candidate	Votes	%	±%
JKNC	Omar Abdullah	144,609	59.68	
INC	Aga Syed Mohdi	73,770	30.45	
BJP	Abdul Rashid Kabuli	11,135	4.60	
Independent	Bashir Ahmad Khandy	4,152	1.71	
BSP	Ghulam Mohi-ud-Din Akhoon	3,656	1.51	
Independent	Hafiza Begum	2,967	1.22	
Independent	Mohammad Sultan	2,009	0.83	
Majority		70,839	29.23	
Turnout				
JKNC hold		Swing		

=== General Election, 1996 ===
1996 Indian general election: Srinagar
Party	Candidate	Votes	%	±%
INC	Ghulam Mohammad Mir	55,503	18.63	
JD	Farooq Ahmad Anderabi	53,904	18.10	
Independent	Javaid	38,834	13.04	
JKPP	Mohammad Akbar	36,330	12.20	
BJP	Amar Nath Vaishanvi	35,911	12.06	
Independent	Mehbooba	18,369	6.17	
Independent	Roshan Fayaz Rahat	17,230	5.78	
Independent	Bashir Ahmad Kathoo	16,863	5.66	
Independent	Ghulam Mohammad	15,999	5.37	
Independent	Brij Nath Dhar	5,878	1.97	
Independent	Nazir Ahmad	3,070	1.03	
Majority		1,599	0.53	
Turnout				
INC hold		Swing		

=== General Election, 1989 ===
1989 Indian general election: Srinagar
Party	Candidate	Votes	%	±%
JKNC	Mohammad Shafi Bhat	0	0.00	N/A
Majority		Won Uncontested		
Turnout		0		
JKNC hold		Swing		

=== General Election, 1984 ===
1984 Indian general election: Srinagar
Party	Candidate	Votes	%	±%
JKNC	Abdul Rashid Kabuli	367,249	81.08	
Independent	Muzaffer Ahmed Shah	80,972	17.88	
Independent	Ghulam Nabi Keng	2,020	0.45	
Independent	Syed Sajad Hussain	1,931	0.43	
Independent	Pushkar Nath Koul	764	0.17	
Majority		286,277	63.20	
Turnout				
JKNC hold		Swing		

=== General Election, 1980 ===
1980 Indian general election: Srinagar
Party	Candidate	Votes	%	±%
JKNC	Farooq Abdullah	0	0.00	N/A
Majority		Won Uncontested		
Turnout		0		
JKNC hold		Swing		

=== General Election, 1977 ===
1977 Indian general election: Srinagar
Party	Candidate	Votes	%	±%
JKNC	Akbar Jahan Begam	210,072	67.73	
Independent	Molvi Iftikhar Hussain Ansari	87,431	28.19	
Independent	Haji Mushtaq Ahmad	5,784	1.86	
Independent	Poshkar Nath Kaul	3,629	1.17	
Independent	Qazi Mohamad Yusaf	3,242	1.05	
Majority		122,641	39.54	
Turnout				
JKNC hold		Swing		

=== General Election, 1971 ===
1971 Indian general election: Srinagar
Party	Candidate	Votes	%	±%
Independent	Shamim Ahmad Shamim	128,948	61.78	
INC	Bakhshi Gulam Mohd	71,140	34.08	
ABJS	Triloki Nath Dhar	5,234	2.51	
Independent	Gulam Mohd. Bakhsh	1,418	0.68	
Independent	Gulam Ahmad Mir	1,096	0.53	
Independent	Pushkar Nath Vakil	887	0.42	
Majority		57,808	27.70	
Turnout				
Independent hold		Swing		

== See also ==
- Baramulla Lok Sabha constituency
