= Rajpora Assembly constituency =

Constituency of the Jammu and Kashmir Legislative Assembly

Coordinates: 33.82°N 74.82°E

Rajpora
- Constituency No. 35 for the Jammu and Kashmir Legislative Assembly

Constituency details
- Country: India
- State: Jammu and Kashmir
- District: Pulwama
- Lok Sabha constituency: Srinagar
- Established: 1951

Member of Legislative Assembly
- Incumbent Ghulam Mohi Uddin Mir
- Party: Jammu and Kashmir National Conference
- Elected year: 2024

Rajpora Assembly constituency is one of 90 constituencies in the Jammu and Kashmir Legislative Assembly of Jammu and Kashmir a north state of India. Rajpora is part of the Srinagar Lok Sabha constituency.

== Members of the Legislative Assembly ==
Election	Member	Party
1951	Abdul Gani Trali	Jammu and Kashmir National Conference
1957	Ghulam Mohammad Rajpori	Jammu and Kashmir National Conference
1962	Ghulam Mohammad Rajpori	Jammu and Kashmir National Conference
1967	Ghulam Mohammad Rajpori	Indian National Congress
1972	Bashir Ahmed Magrey	Indian National Congress
1996	Ghulam Mohi Uddin Mir	Jammu & Kashmir National Conference
2002	Syed Bashir Ahmad Shah	Jammu and Kashmir Peoples Democratic Party
2008	Syed Bashir Ahmad Shah	Jammu and Kashmir Peoples Democratic Party
2014	Haseeb Drabu	Jammu and Kashmir Peoples Democratic Party
2024	Ghulam Mohi Uddin Mir	Jammu & Kashmir National Conference

== Election results ==
=== Assembly Election 2024 ===
2024 Jammu and Kashmir Legislative Assembly election: Rajpora
Party	Candidate	Votes	%	±%
JKNC	Ghulam Mohi Uddin Mir	25,627	47.93%	▲19.70
JKPDP	Syed Bashir Ahmad	11,314	21.16%	▼15.79
BJP	Arsheed Ahmad Bhat	5,584	10.44%	New
Independent	Mohammed Altaf Bhat	3,273	6.12%	New
AAP	Muddasir Hassan	2,827	5.29%	New
Independent	Ghulam Hasan Malik	1,357	2.54%	New
DPAP	Ghulam Nabi Wani Niloora	1,354	2.53%	New
NOTA	None of the Above	1,248	2.33%	▲0.62
Margin of victory		14,313	26.77%	▲18.05
Turnout		53,467	60.01%	▲5.91
Registered electors		89,102		▼1.63
JKNC gain from JKPDP		Swing	▲10.98	

=== Assembly Election 2014 ===
2014 Jammu and Kashmir Legislative Assembly election: Rajpora
Party	Candidate	Votes	%	±%
JKPDP	Haseeb Drabu	18,103	36.95%	▲11.82
JKNC	Ghulam Mohi Uddin Mir	13,830	28.23%	▲10.40
Independent	Ghulam Nabi Wani	6,477	13.22%	New
Independent	Peerzada Syed Bashir Ahmad	5,133	10.48%	New
INC	Fayaz Ahmad Dar	1,923	3.92%	▼6.87
Independent	Sayed Riyaz Ahmad Riyaz Khawar	1,565	3.19%	New
RPI(A)	Mohammed Abdullah Dar	571	1.17%	New
NOTA	None of the Above	840	1.71%	New
Margin of victory		4,273	8.72%	▲6.38
Turnout		48,997	54.09%	▲3.48
Registered electors		90,581		▲13.16
JKPDP hold		Swing	▲11.82	

=== Assembly Election 2008 ===
2008 Jammu and Kashmir Legislative Assembly election: Rajpora
Party	Candidate	Votes	%	±%
JKPDP	Syed Bashir Ahmad Shah	10,177	25.12%	▼33.48
Independent	Ghulam Mohi Uddin Mir	9,230	22.79%	New
JKNC	Gh Nabi Wani	7,222	17.83%	▼6.79
INC	Abdul Gani Dar	4,371	10.79%	▲4.66
Jammu & Kashmir Democratic Party Nationalist	Farooq Jan Para	1,300	3.21%	New
JKANC	Sajad Ahmad Dar	1,186	2.93%	New
BSP	Fayaz Ahmad Dar	1,070	2.64%	New
Margin of victory		947	2.34%	▼31.64
Turnout		40,508	50.61%	▲13.90
Registered electors		80,044		▲23.47
JKPDP hold		Swing	▼33.48	

=== Assembly Election 2002 ===
2002 Jammu and Kashmir Legislative Assembly election Rajpora
Party	Candidate	Votes	%	±%
JKPDP	Syed Bashir Ahmad	13,946	58.60%	New
JKNC	Ghulam Mohi Uddin Mir	5,860	24.62%	▼36.58
JKAL	Mohammed Yousf Dar	1,641	6.90%	▼0.49
INC	Mir Ghulam Nabi Patail	1,458	6.13%	▼1.20
BJP	Ghulam Mohammed Shah	457	1.92%	New
Independent	Ghulam Rasool Bhat	437	1.84%	New
Margin of victory		8,086	33.98%	▼3.14
Turnout		23,799	36.71%	▼10.94
Registered electors		64,829		▲22.34
JKPDP gain from JKNC		Swing	▼2.60	

=== Assembly Election 1996 ===
1996 Jammu and Kashmir Legislative Assembly election: Rajpora
Party	Candidate	Votes	%	±%
JKNC	Ghulam Mohi Uddin Mir	15,455	61.20%	New
JD	Naba Mir	6,083	24.09%	New
JKAL	Ghulam Nabi Wani	1,866	7.39%	New
INC	Bashir Ahmed	1,849	7.32%	▼35.89
Margin of victory		9,372	37.11%	▲33.16
Turnout		25,253	51.63%	▼18.35
Registered electors		52,993		▲66.48
JKNC gain from INC		Swing	▲17.99	

=== Assembly Election 1972 ===
1972 Jammu and Kashmir Legislative Assembly election: Rajpora
Party	Candidate	Votes	%	±%
INC	Bashir Ahmed Magrey	9,079	43.21%	New
Independent	Ghulam Qadir Mir	8,248	39.26%	New
Independent	Ali Mohammed Bhat	1,340	6.38%	New
Independent	Master Sonaullah	1,217	5.79%	New
Independent	Mohammed Abdul Mir	1,126	5.36%	New
Margin of victory		831	3.96%	
Turnout		21,010	72.39%	▲66.00
Registered electors		31,832		▲12.92
INC hold		Swing		

=== Assembly Election 1967 ===
1967 Jammu and Kashmir Legislative Assembly election: Rajpora
Party	Candidate	Votes	%	±%
INC	G. M. Rajpori	Unopposed		
Registered electors		28,190		▲7.51
INC gain from JKNC		Swing		

=== Assembly Election 1962 ===
1962 Jammu and Kashmir Legislative Assembly election: Rajpora
Party	Candidate	Votes	%	±%
JKNC	Ghulam Mohammad Rajpori	22,196	98.65%	New
Democratic National Conference	Abdul Sattar Ranjoor	181	0.80%	New
Margin of victory		22,015	97.85%	
Turnout		22,499	86.51%	
Registered electors		26,220		
JKNC win (new seat)				

== See also ==
- Rajpora
- List of constituencies of Jammu and Kashmir Legislative Assembly
