= Haseeb Drabu =

Indian politician (born 1961)

Haseeb A Drabu

Finance Minister of Jammu and Kashmir
- In office March 2015 – March 2018

Chairman and CEO of Jammu & Kashmir Bank
- In office 2005–2010

Air Works (Director on board)
- Incumbent
- Assumed office 2021

Personal details
- Born: 1961 (age 64–65) Srinagar, Jammu and Kashmir, India
- Party: Jammu and Kashmir People's Democratic Party (2014-2018)
- Spouse: Roohi Nazki
- Relations: Ali Khan Mahmudabad (son in-law)
- Children: Onaiza Drabu, Muqeet Drabu
- Education: MPhil
- Alma mater: Centre for Development Studies (Trivandrum)
- Occupation: Politician, economist

Haseeb A Drabu (born 1961) is an Indian politician, economist and the former member of Jammu and Kashmir Legislative Assembly from Rajpora constituency in Pulwama district. He was elected as Finance Minister of Jammu and Kashmir in the BJP-PDP coalition government from 2015 to 2018.

He has worked as a lawmaker, policy planner, banker and an economic commentator.

Drabu is married to his second wife Roohi Nazki, a former Tata Interactive Systems executive who later returned to Srinagar to start a tea-house.

== Political career ==
In 2014, Drabu joined the J&K Peoples Democratic Party (JKPDP). Later in the year, he contested elections and won with a huge margin the elections to the Legislative Assembly of J&K from Rajpora Constituency in Pulwana district. He continued to be a member of the Legislative Assembly of J&K till it was dissolved by the Governor on 21 November 2018. He was elected as Finance Minister of Jammu and Kashmir from 2015 to 2018.

In early 2015, J&K PDP founder & patron, Mufti Mohammed Sayeed chose Drabu as the interlocutor from his party to hammer out an alliance with the Bharatiya Janata Party. After three months of negotiations with BJP, Drabu along with Ram Madhav of the BJP scripted the basis of the BJP-PDP alliance to form the government in Jammu and Kashmir. Drabu was later elected as Finance Minister in the government. Soon after Drabu was sacked from the cabinet in March 2018 by Mehbooba Mufti over his controversial remarks about the state, he quit PDP in December 2018. Soon after his exit, the alliance broke and the BJP-PDP government in J&K fell.

While he was the finance minister of J&K, Jammu and Kashmir reached Rank 7 in fiscal management, leaving behind states like Maharashtra, Uttar Pradesh, and Madhya Pradesh. This is as per the Public Affairs Index (PAI) by the Public Affairs Centre India. When he took over it was ranked 24th in financial management.

He, further, as a state finance minister, was an active member of the GST council in its most crucial phase of formulating and introducing the new tax regime in India. It was his initiative that the historic meeting of the GST Council which approved the rate structure, was held at Srinagar; first time outside New Delhi.

As finance minister of J&K, he designed and negotiated a Rs 80,000 crore development package for J&K which was announced by the prime minister in May 2015. He also negotiated the first-ever FDI to set up a logistics hub in J&K. He introduced a new state budget structure and a new government payments system.

== Other engagements ==
- In the early 1990s, Drabu worked as a journalist with a business newspaper Business Standard, and was also seen close to Jammu Kashmir Liberation Front. He, in late 1990s, was involved with national economic policy making in India, including in the Planning Commission, Finance Commission and the Economic Advisory Council of the prime minister. He was also associated with the Tenth Finance Commission and also worked as a consultant to Asian Development Bank.
- After the 2002 state elections, a PDP-led coalition state government came to power in Jammu and Kashmir and it appointed Drabu as its economic advisor in January 2003.
- On 9 June 2005, Drabu was elected as the chairman and CEO of J&K Bank by the then Chief Minister Mufti Saeed however, on 28 August 2010, he quit the post after he was asked to resign by the then newly elected Chief Minister Omar Abdullah for his "closeness" to PDP politicians.

== Current engagements ==
In February 2021, Drabu was appointed to the Board of Directors of the Maintenance Repair and Overhaul (MRO) and aviation service provider company Air Works as an independent director.

== Electoral performance ==
Election	Constituency	Party	Result	Votes %	Opposition Candidate	Opposition Party	Opposition vote %	Ref
2014	Rajpora	JKPDP	Won	36.95%	Ghulam Mohi Uddin Mir	JKNC	28.23%	
