= Mohammad Ashraf Mir =

Indian politician (born 1972)

Mohammad Ashraf Mir (born 1972) is an Indian politician from Jammu and Kashmir. He was an MLA from now defunct Sonawar Assembly constituency in Srinagar district. He won the 2014 Jammu and Kashmir Legislative Assembly election representing the Jammu and Kashmir People's Democratic Party. He also lost from Lal Chowk Assembly constituency in 2024 election as Apni Party candidate to Sheikh Ahsan Ahmed by a margin of over 11,000 votes.

== Early life and education ==
Mir is from Lalchowk, Srinagar district, Jammu and Kashmir. He is the son of late Abdul Salam Mir. He completed his M.B.A. in 1985 at BMS College of Engineering.

== Career ==
Mir won from Sonawar Assembly constituency representing the Jammu and Kashmir People's Democratic Party in the 2014 Jammu and Kashmir Legislative Assembly election. He polled 14,283 votes and defeated his nearest rival and former Chief Minister Omar Abdullah of JKNC, by a margin of 4,783 votes. In May 2024, he lost from Srinagar Lok Sabha constituency in the 2024 Indian general election in Jammu and Kashmir. He also lost from Lal Chowk in 2024 election as Apni Party candidate to Sheikh Ahsan Ahmed by a margin of over 11,000 votes.

In 2014, there was a controversy where an AK47 was allegedly fired by Mir in celebration after his victory was announced. But he denied the allegations.
