= Shopian Assembly constituency =

Constituency of the Jammu and Kashmir Legislative Assembly

Coordinates: 33.72°N 74.83°E

Shopian
- Constituency No. 37 for the Jammu and Kashmir Legislative Assembly

Constituency details
- Country: India
- State: Jammu and Kashmir
- District: Shopian
- Lok Sabha constituency: Srinagar
- Established: 1962

Member of Legislative Assembly
- Incumbent Shabir Ahmad Kullay
- Party: Independent
- Elected year: 2024

Shopian Assembly constituency is one of the 90 constituencies in the Jammu and Kashmir Legislative Assembly of Jammu and Kashmir, a north state of India. Shopian is also part of Srinagar Lok Sabha constituency.

== Members of the Legislative Assembly ==
Election	Member	Party
1962	Abdul Majid Bandey	Jammu and Kashmir National Conference
1967	S. A. Shamim	Independent
1972	Abdul Majid Bandey	Independent
1977	Sheikh Mohammad Mansoor	Jammu and Kashmir National Conference
1983	Sheikh Mohammad Mansoor	Jammu and Kashmir National Conference
1987	Sheikh Mohammad Mansoor	Jammu and Kashmir National Conference
1996	Sheikh Muhammad Rafi	Jammu and Kashmir National Conference
2002	Gulam Hassan Khan	Jammu and Kashmir People's Democratic Party
2008	Abdul Razak Zawoora	Jammu and Kashmir People's Democratic Party
2014	Mohammad Yousuf Bhat	Jammu and Kashmir People's Democratic Party
2024	Shabir Ahmad Kullay	Independent

== Election results ==
=== Assembly Election 2024 ===
2024 Jammu and Kashmir Legislative Assembly election : Shopian
Party	Candidate	Votes	%	±%
Independent	Shabir Ahmad Kullay	14,113	23.74	New
JKNC	Sheikh Mohammad Rafi	12,906	21.71	New
Independent	Raja Abdul Waheed	10,440	17.56	New
BJP	Javid Ahmad Qadri	6,895	11.60	▲3.48
JKPDP	Yawar Shafi Banday	5,486	9.23	▼24.97
JKAP	Ovais Mushtaq	3,076	5.17	New
NOTA	None of the Above	1,559	2.62	▲0.66
JKNPP	Mushtaq Ahmad Khan	1,448	2.44	New
Independent	Suhail Ahmad Mir	1,221	2.05	New
Independent	Mohammed Yaqoob Malla	959	1.61	New
Independent	Feroz Ahmad Najar	770	1.30	New
Margin of victory		1,207	2.03	▼3.64
Turnout		59,457	59.13	▲8.49
Registered electors		1,00,546		▲22.10
Independent gain from JKPDP		Swing	▼10.46	

=== Assembly Election 2014 ===
2014 Jammu and Kashmir Legislative Assembly election : Shopian
Party	Candidate	Votes	%	±%
JKPDP	Mohammad Yousuf Bhat	14,262	34.20	▲12.96
Independent	Shabir Ahmad Kullay	11,896	28.52	New
JKNC	Sheikh Mohammed Rafi	5,280	12.66	▼0.41
BJP	Javid Ahmad Qadri	3,384	8.11	New
INC	Mushtaq Ahmad Khanday	2,642	6.33	▼7.48
Independent	Tariq Ahmad Ahanger	894	2.14	New
CPI	Abdul Rashid Pandit	849	2.04	▼3.08
NOTA	None of the Above	819	1.96	New
All Jammu and Kashmir Republican Party	Mohammed Yaqoob Rather	648	1.55	New
Independent	Mohammed Yousuf Haji	533	1.28	New
JKNPP	Shah Fayaz Ahmad	499	1.20	New
Margin of victory		2,366	5.67	▼1.75
Turnout		41,706	50.65	▼2.07
Registered electors		82,348		▲15.14
JKPDP hold		Swing	▲12.96	

=== Assembly Election 2008 ===
2008 Jammu and Kashmir Legislative Assembly election : Shopian
Party	Candidate	Votes	%	±%
JKPDP	Ab Razak Zawoora	8,006	21.23	▼5.96
INC	Mohammed Shafi	5,208	13.81	▼6.04
JKNC	Shabir Ahmad Kullay	4,929	13.07	▼9.33
JKANC	Sheikh Mohammed Rafi	4,001	10.61	New
Independent	Mir Hussain	2,748	7.29	New
CPI	Ghulam Mohammed Sheikh	1,930	5.12	▼7.44
CPI(M)	Mohammed Abdullah Wani	1,652	4.38	New
SP	Gh Nabi Shah	1,612	4.28	New
Independent	Gulzar Ahmad Bhat	1,253	3.32	New
Jammu & Kashmir Democratic Party Nationalist	Abdul Waheed Rather	1,034	2.74	New
Independent	Ghulam Hassan Khan	1,001	2.65	New
Margin of victory		2,798	7.42	▲2.62
Turnout		37,704	52.72	▲25.82
Registered electors		71,517		▲28.14
JKPDP hold		Swing	▼5.96	

=== Assembly Election 2002 ===
2002 Jammu and Kashmir Legislative Assembly election : Shopian
Party	Candidate	Votes	%	±%
JKPDP	Ghulam Hassan Khan	4,083	27.20	New
JKNC	Sheikh Mohammed Rafi	3,363	22.40	▼26.69
INC	Mohammed Shafi Banday	2,980	19.85	▲9.09
Independent	Ghulam Nabi Shah	1,960	13.06	New
CPI	Ghulam Nabi Yatoo	1,886	12.56	New
BJP	Mohammed Ilyas Kumar	740	4.93	New
Margin of victory		720	4.80	▼10.87
Turnout		15,012	26.91	▼18.19
Registered electors		55,812		▲19.47
JKPDP gain from JKNC		Swing	▼21.90	

=== Assembly Election 1996 ===
1996 Jammu and Kashmir Legislative Assembly election : Shopian
Party	Candidate	Votes	%	±%
JKNC	Shiekh Mohammed Rafi	10,340	49.10	▲1.09
JD	Ghulam Nabi Shah	7,040	33.43	New
INC	Mohammed Shafi Banday	2,266	10.76	New
Independent	Farooq Ahmad Mir	1,415	6.72	New
Margin of victory		3,300	15.67	▲14.78
Turnout		21,061	48.06	▼34.23
Registered electors		46,715		▼1.64
JKNC hold		Swing	▲1.09	

=== Assembly Election 1987 ===
1987 Jammu and Kashmir Legislative Assembly election : Shopian
Party	Candidate	Votes	%	±%
JKNC	Sheikh Mohammed Mansoor	18,083	48.00	▼0.01
Independent	Abdul Ahad Thoker	17,747	47.11	New
CPI	Abdul Rahman Bhat	1,285	3.41	New
Margin of victory		336	0.89	▼18.29
Turnout		37,671	81.68	▲3.34
Registered electors		47,495		▲18.16
JKNC hold		Swing		

=== Assembly Election 1983 ===
1983 Jammu and Kashmir Legislative Assembly election : Shopian
Party	Candidate	Votes	%	±%
JKNC	Sheikh Mohammed Mansoor	14,662	48.01	▼11.33
JI	Moulana Mohammed Amin	8,805	28.83	▲10.15
Independent	Ghulam Hassa Khan	3,376	11.05	New
INC	Abdul Majid	2,839	9.30	▲5.79
JKNC	Mohammed Iqbal	409	1.34	▼58.00
Independent	Bashir Ahmed	371	1.21	New
Margin of victory		5,857	19.18	▼21.49
Turnout		30,540	80.69	▲5.93
Registered electors		40,197		▲10.40
JKNC hold		Swing	▼11.33	

=== Assembly Election 1977 ===
1977 Jammu and Kashmir Legislative Assembly election : Shopian
Party	Candidate	Votes	%	±%
JKNC	Sheikh Mohammed Mansoor	15,133	59.34	New
JI	Hakim Ghulam Nabi	4,763	18.68	▼13.34
JP	Shamim Ahmed Shamim	3,217	12.61	New
INC	Ghulam Hassan Khan	893	3.50	New
CPI	Abdul Rahman Khan	734	2.88	▼22.99
Independent	Mohammed Ashraf	407	1.60	New
Independent	Abdul Majid Bandey	355	1.39	New
Margin of victory		10,370	40.66	▲30.57
Turnout		25,502	73.06	▲4.77
Registered electors		36,409		▲19.13
JKNC gain from Independent		Swing	▲17.23	

=== Assembly Election 1972 ===
1972 Jammu and Kashmir Legislative Assembly election : Shopian
Party	Candidate	Votes	%	±%
Independent	Abdul Majid Bandey	8,401	42.11	New
JI	Haki Ghulam Nabi Shah	6,388	32.02	New
CPI	Abdul Sattar Ranjoor	5,160	25.87	▲8.93
Margin of victory		2,013	10.09	▲1.76
Turnout		19,949	68.85	▲4.59
Registered electors		30,562		▲11.87
Independent hold		Swing		

=== Assembly Election 1967 ===
1967 Jammu and Kashmir Legislative Assembly election : Shopian
Party	Candidate	Votes	%	±%
Independent	S. A. Shamim	7,576	45.70	New
INC	G. H. Khan	6,195	37.37	New
CPI	Abdul Sattar Ranjoor	2,807	16.93	New
Margin of victory		1,381	8.33	
Turnout		16,578	63.29	▲60.68
Registered electors		27,320		▲7.66
Independent gain from JKNC		Swing		

=== Assembly Election 1962 ===
1962 Jammu and Kashmir Legislative Assembly election : Shopian
Party	Candidate	Votes	%	±%
JKNC	Abdul Majid Bandey	Unopposed		
Registered electors		25,376		
JKNC win (new seat)				

== See also ==
- Shopian
- List of constituencies of Jammu and Kashmir Legislative Assembly
