= Charari Sharief Assembly constituency =

Constituency of the Jammu and Kashmir Legislative Assembly

Coordinates: 33.863°N 74.766°E

Charari Sharief
- Constituency No. 30 for the Jammu and Kashmir Legislative Assembly

Constituency details
- Country: India
- State: Jammu and Kashmir
- District: Budgam
- Lok Sabha constituency: Srinagar
- Established: 1962

Member of Legislative Assembly
- Incumbent Abdul Rahim Rather
- Party: Jammu and Kashmir National Conference
- Elected year: 2024

Charari Sharief Assembly constituency is one of the 90 constituencies in the Jammu and Kashmir Legislative Assembly of Jammu and Kashmir a north state of India. Charari Sharief is also part of Srinagar Lok Sabha constituency.

== Members of the Legislative Assembly ==
Election	Member	Party
1962	Bakshi Abdul Rashid	Jammu & Kashmir National Conference
1967	Abdul Qayoom	Indian National Congress
1972	Abdul Qayoom	Indian National Congress
1977	Abdul Rahim Rather	Jammu & Kashmir National Conference
1983	Abdul Rahim Rather	Jammu & Kashmir National Conference
1987	Abdul Rahim Rather	Jammu & Kashmir National Conference
1996	Abdul Rahim Rather	Jammu & Kashmir National Conference
2002	Abdul Rahim Rather	Jammu & Kashmir National Conference
2008	Abdul Rahim Rather	Jammu & Kashmir National Conference
2014	Ghulam Nabi Lone	Jammu and Kashmir People's Democratic Party
2024	Abdul Rahim Rather	Jammu and Kashmir National Conference

== Election results ==
=== Assembly Election 2024 ===
2024 Jammu and Kashmir Legislative Assembly election : Charari Sharief
Party	Candidate	Votes	%	±%
JKNC	Abdul Rahim Rather	35,957	48.48	New
JKPDP	Ghulam Nabi Lone	24,461	32.98	▼17.87
JKPDF	Hakeem Mohammed Yaseen Shah	4,401	5.93	New
JKAP	Owais Ashraf Shah	1,853	2.50	New
BJP	Zahid Hussain Jan	1,779	2.40	▲1.09
NOTA	None of the Above	1,333	1.80	▲1.24
Independent	Javed Mohmmed Hubi	1,295	1.75	New
Independent	Nisar Ahmad Mir	1,079	1.45	New
Independent	Mohammed Yousuf Ganaie	999	1.35	New
Independent	Gazanfar Ali	671	0.90	New
Margin of victory		11,496	15.50	▲7.50
Turnout		74,176	67.94	▼14.50
Registered electors		1,09,174		▲39.33
JKNC gain from JKPDP		Swing	▼2.37	

=== Assembly Election 2014 ===
2014 Jammu and Kashmir Legislative Assembly election : Charari Sharief
Party	Candidate	Votes	%	±%
JKPDP	Ghulam Nabi Lone	32,849	50.85	▲15.07
JKNC	Abdul Rahim Rather	27,682	42.85	▼5.45
INC	Zahid Hussain	922	1.43	▼2.57
BJP	Ghulam Mohammed Chopan	845	1.31	New
JKPC	Mohammed Lateef Lone	727	1.13	New
Independent	Showkat Ahmad Raina	579	0.90	New
NOTA	None of the Above	363	0.56	New
Margin of victory		5,167	8.00	▼4.53
Turnout		64,600	82.44	▲7.86
Registered electors		78,359		▲14.85
JKPDP gain from JKNC		Swing	▲2.54	

=== Assembly Election 2008 ===
2008 Jammu and Kashmir Legislative Assembly election : Charari Sharief
Party	Candidate	Votes	%	±%
JKNC	Abdul Rahim Rather	24,579	48.30	▼2.99
JKPDP	Ghulam Nabi Lone	18,204	35.78	▼6.02
JKPDF	Nazir Ahmad Yatoo	3,232	6.35	New
INC	Mohammed Maqbool Malla	2,036	4.00	▼0.29
JKNPP	Abdul Rashid Parra	781	1.53	New
LJP	Aftab Ahmad Mir	683	1.34	New
JKANC	Bashir Ahmad Dar	630	1.24	New
Independent	Ferooz Ahmad Bhat	508	1.00	New
Margin of victory		6,375	12.53	▲3.03
Turnout		50,883	74.58	▲10.86
Registered electors		68,229		▲9.98
JKNC hold		Swing	▼2.99	

=== Assembly Election 2002 ===
2002 Jammu and Kashmir Legislative Assembly election : Charari Sharief
Party	Candidate	Votes	%	±%
JKNC	Abdul Rahim Rather	20,275	51.29	▼9.01
JKPDP	Ghulam Nabi Lone	16,520	41.79	New
INC	Zahid Hussain	1,697	4.29	▼12.03
Independent	Mohammed Jamal Yatoo	1,035	2.62	New
Margin of victory		3,755	9.50	▼31.12
Turnout		39,527	63.71	▲2.39
Registered electors		62,040		▲17.11
JKNC hold		Swing	▼9.01	

=== Assembly Election 1996 ===
1996 Jammu and Kashmir Legislative Assembly election : Charari Sharief
Party	Candidate	Votes	%	±%
JKNC	Abdul Rahim Rather	19,590	60.31	▼22.63
JD	Ghulam Hassan Wani	6,395	19.69	New
INC	Ghulam Nabi	5,302	16.32	New
AIMF	Ghulam Mohammed Gani	1,196	3.68	New
Margin of victory		13,195	40.62	▼32.34
Turnout		32,483	64.13	▼19.43
Registered electors		52,975		▲39.42
JKNC hold		Swing	▼22.63	

=== Assembly Election 1987 ===
1987 Jammu and Kashmir Legislative Assembly election : Charari Sharief
Party	Candidate	Votes	%	±%
JKNC	Abdul Rahim Rather	25,447	82.94	▲13.15
Independent	Abdul Rashid	3,062	9.98	New
JKNC	Ghulam Mohammed	1,787	5.82	▼63.97
Independent	Ghulam Qadir	184	0.60	New
Margin of victory		22,385	72.96	▲29.10
Turnout		30,680	85.54	▲3.91
Registered electors		37,997		▲15.25
JKNC hold		Swing	▲13.15	

=== Assembly Election 1983 ===
1983 Jammu and Kashmir Legislative Assembly election : Charari Sharief
Party	Candidate	Votes	%	±%
JKNC	Abdul Rahim Rather	17,678	69.79	▼2.16
INC	Abdul Qayoom	6,567	25.93	▲2.71
JKNC	Ghulam Mohammed	937	3.70	▼68.26
Margin of victory		11,111	43.86	▼4.88
Turnout		25,330	79.47	▲7.66
Registered electors		32,968		▲11.12
JKNC hold		Swing		

=== Assembly Election 1977 ===
1977 Jammu and Kashmir Legislative Assembly election : Charari Sharief
Party	Candidate	Votes	%	±%
JKNC	Abdul Rahim Rather	14,766	71.96	New
INC	Abdul Qayoom	4,764	23.22	▼54.36
JP	Peerzada Ali Shah	991	4.83	New
Margin of victory		10,002	48.74	▼16.15
Turnout		20,521	71.84	▼11.43
Registered electors		29,668		▲10.48
JKNC gain from INC		Swing		

=== Assembly Election 1972 ===
1972 Jammu and Kashmir Legislative Assembly election : Charari Sharief
Party	Candidate	Votes	%	±%
INC	Abdul Qayoom	16,788	77.57	▲25.36
Independent	Abdul Rahim Rather	2,744	12.68	New
Independent	Rough Nath Bhat	2,054	9.49	New
Margin of victory		14,044	64.89	▲52.55
Turnout		21,642	84.14	▲32.53
Registered electors		26,853		▲7.97
INC hold		Swing		

=== Assembly Election 1967 ===
1967 Jammu and Kashmir Legislative Assembly election : Charari Sharief
Party	Candidate	Votes	%	±%
INC	Abdul Qayoom	6,241	52.21	New
JKNC	G. N. Wani	4,766	39.87	New
Democratic National Conference	D. Bhat	947	7.92	New
Margin of victory		1,475	12.34	
Turnout		11,954	50.12	▲48.06
Registered electors		24,871		▲5.02
INC gain from JKNC		Swing		

=== Assembly Election 1962 ===
1962 Jammu and Kashmir Legislative Assembly election : Charari Sharief
Party	Candidate	Votes	%	±%
JKNC	Bakshi Abdul Rashid	Unopposed		
Registered electors		23,683		
JKNC win (new seat)				

== See also ==
- Charari Sharief
- List of constituencies of Jammu and Kashmir Legislative Assembly
