= Abdul Rashid Kabuli =

Indian politician

Abdul Rashid Kabuli (born 15 August 1936) is a politician from the Indian state of Jammu and Kashmir, who belonged to the National Conference political party, and twice served as the Member of Parliament from Srinagar Lok Sabha constituency.

== Electoral performance ==
Election	Constituency	Party	Result	Votes %	Opposition Candidate	Opposition Party	Opposition vote %	Ref
1996	Eidgah	Independent	Lost	6.06%	Mubarak Ahmed Gul	JKNC	78.12%	
1977	Eidgah	JP	Won	52.83%	Ghulam Rasool Rashi	JKNC	47.17%	

Lok Sabha
Preceded by Farooq Abdullah	Member of Parliament for Srinagar; 1983(?)–1989	Succeeded by Mohammad Shafi Bhat
