= Syed Bashir Ahmad =

Indian politician (born 1952)

Syed Bashir Ahmad سید بشیر احمد
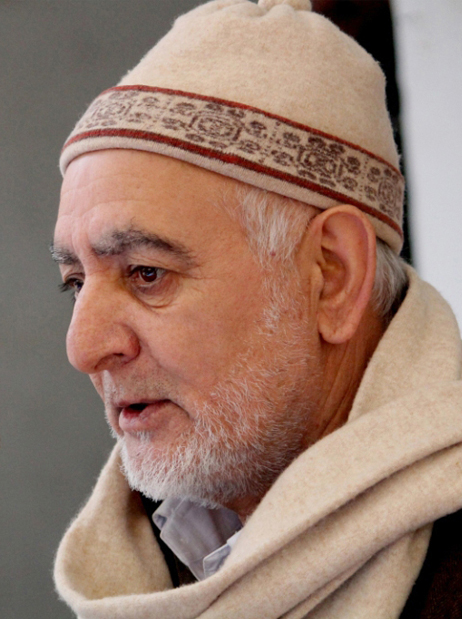

Member of Legislative Assembly
- In office 2002 - January 2015
- Constituency: Rajpora (Assembly)

Personal details
- Born: 2 January 1952 (age 74) Pulwama, Jammu and Kashmir, India
- Party: JKPDP (1999 - 2014) (August 2024 - Present)
- Children: Four sons and one daughter

Syed Bashir Ahmad (Kashmiri: سید بشیر احمد) (born 2 January 1952 in Sheikhar, Pulwama district in Jammu and Kashmir) is a Kashmiri politician. He has worked for the social upliftment of people living in rural areas and has championed the cause of weaker sections. He was the Member of Legislative Assembly from Rajpora Constituency and Chairman of Petitions Committee of the Jammu and Kashmir Legislative Assembly.

== Political career ==
He was associated with politics from a very young age and remained associated with Janata Dal, Indian National Congress and Jan Morcha. When elections for the state assembly were held in 1996, Syed Bashir contested the elections from Pulwama constituency on a Janata Dal ticket against the National Conference candidate, but lost by a thin margin.

In 1999, he along with other leaders founded Jammu & Kashmir Peoples Democratic Party (PDP), which was then headed by the former Home Minister of India and Jammu and Kashmir Chief Minister Mufti Mohammad Sayeed. In 2002, he contested and won the Assembly Elections from Rajpora Constituency and was made a Minister for Education in the Mufti Mohammad Sayeed led Government. He later held the portfolios of 'PHE, Irrigation and Flood Control', and 'Roads & Buildings'. He again won from the same constituency in the 2008 Assembly Elections.

In July 2005, militants made a bid on the life of Syed Bashir Ahmad at crowded Budshah Chowk in Srinagar when he was on way from Civil Secretariat. He escaped unhurt but two of his personnel security officers (PSO) and a civilian were injured in the shooting incident.

In July 2014, PDP dropped the name of Syed Bashir Ahmad from its list of candidates for 2014 Assembly elections. Soon after that hundreds of his party workers from Rajpora Constituency took to streets and staged a massive protest outside Housing Colony in Pulwama which houses top politicians and legislative members. The protesters amid anti-party slogans castigated Mufti Muhammad Sayeed for ignoring Syed Bashir. These protesters later on drove their vehicles towards Srinagar and staged a protest outside PDP president’s official Gupkar residence and demanded mandate in favour of Syed Bashir. Syed Bashir later revealed that he was not taken into confidence before dropping his name from the list which had earlier included his name as the party candidate from Rajpora constituency and was just told on phone that the candidate was changed.

In October 2014, Syed Bashir was expelled from PDP. According to a statement by PDP, Syed Bashir was expelled from the party for holding anti-party activities. In an interview to press, Syed Bashir refuted those allegations and said:

"I do not know why I have been expelled. I did not receive any notice from the party stating the cause of my expulsion. I was phoned by a journalist yesterday evening that I have been expelled from the party. They should have exposed my anti-party activities. I never involved myself in any anti-party activity. I didn't speak against PDP. I respected the party symbol even when I was denied the party mandate."

On 30 October 2014, Syed Bashir Ahmad announced that he would contest the J&K Legislative Assembly elections 2014, as an independent candidate. Addressing a press conference at his Sheikhar residence, Syed Bashir said, "Though many political parties had offered me the ticket but I declined them as my workers and supporters wanted me to contest independently. I was left with no option but to respect their aspirations and emotions."

On 22 August 2024, Syed Bashir Ahmad rejoined the People's Democratic Party.

== Electoral performance ==
Election	Constituency	Party	Result	Votes %	Opposition Candidate	Opposition Party	Opposition vote %	Ref
2024	Rajpora	JKPDP	Lost	21.16%	Ghulam Mohi Uddin Mir	JKNC	47.93%	
2008	Rajpora	JKPDP	Won	25.12%	Ghulam Mohi Uddin Mir	Independent	22.79%	
2002	Rajpora	JKPDP	Won	58.60%	Ghulam Mohi Uddin Mir	JKNC	24.62%	
