= Sonawar Assembly constituency =

Constituency of the Jammu and Kashmir Legislative Assembly

Coordinates: 34.071°N 74.846°E

Sonawar
- Former constituency for the Jammu and Kashmir Legislative Assembly

Constituency details
- Country: India
- State: Jammu and Kashmir
- District: Srinagar
- Established: 1996
- Abolished: 2018

Sonawar was a legislative constituency in the Jammu and Kashmir Legislative Assembly of Jammu and Kashmir a north state of India. Sonawar was also part of Srinagar Lok Sabha constituency.

== Members of the Legislative Assembly ==
Election	Member	Party
1996	Ghulam Mohammed Bawan	Jammu & Kashmir National Conference
2002	Mohammad Yasin Shah	Jammu & Kashmir National Conference
2008	Farooq Abdullah	Jammu & Kashmir National Conference
2009 By-election	Mohammad Yasin Shah	Jammu and Kashmir National Conference
2014	Mohammad Ashraf Mir	Jammu and Kashmir People's Democratic Party

== Election results ==
=== Assembly Election 2014 ===
2014 Jammu and Kashmir Legislative Assembly election : Sonawar
Party	Candidate	Votes	%	±%
JKPDP	Mohammad Ashraf Mir	14,283	41.88%	▼5.16
JKNC	Omar Abdullah	9,500	27.85%	New
Independent	Peer Bilal Ahmad	4,394	12.88%	New
JKPC	Laldin Mir	1,996	5.85%	New
BJP	Darakhshan Andrabi	1,100	3.23%	New
INC	Khem Lata Wakhlu	808	2.37%	New
Independent	Parvez Jamal	458	1.34%	New
NOTA	None of the Above	305	0.89%	New
Margin of victory		4,783	14.02%	▲13.77
Turnout		34,107	44.00%	▲15.58
Registered electors		77,512		▲11.95
JKPDP gain from JKNC		Swing	▼5.42	

=== Assembly By-election 2009 ===
2009 Jammu and Kashmir Legislative Assembly by-election : Sonawar
Party	Candidate	Votes	%	±%
JKNC	Mohammad Yasin Shah	9,306	47.29%	New
JKPDP	Mohammed Ashraf Mir	9,256	47.04%	▲19.18
JKANC	Mohammed Ahmad Shah	1,115	5.67%	New
Margin of victory		50	0.25%	▼0.12
Turnout		19,677	28.42%	▼8.24
Registered electors		69,235		▲2.12
JKNC gain from JKNC		Swing	▲19.06	

=== Assembly Election 2008 ===
2008 Jammu and Kashmir Legislative Assembly election : Sonawar
Party	Candidate	Votes	%	±%
JKNC	Farooq Abdullah	7,018	28.23%	▼26.42
JKPDP	Sheikh Ghulam Qadir Pardesi	6,924	27.86%	▲0.25
INC	Khem Lata Wakhloo	4,301	17.30%	▲6.52
JKNPP	Bashir Ahmad Kathoo	894	3.60%	New
Independent	Syed Mohammed Shah	743	2.99%	New
RJD	Merajuddin Ganai	712	2.86%	New
Independent	Rafi Ud Din Ahmed	530	2.13%	New
Margin of victory		94	0.38%	▼26.67
Turnout		24,856	36.66%	▲26.70
Registered electors		67,796		▲7.15
JKNC hold		Swing	▼26.42	

=== Assembly Election 2002 ===
2002 Jammu and Kashmir Legislative Assembly election : Sonawar
Party	Candidate	Votes	%	±%
JKNC	Mohammad Yasin Shah	3,445	54.66%	▼4.26
JKPDP	Ghulam Hussain Wani	1,740	27.61%	New
INC	Khemlata Wakhloo	680	10.79%	▼5.82
BJP	Gopi Krishen Mujoo	232	3.68%	New
Independent	Hafiza Bagum	206	3.27%	New
Margin of victory		1,705	27.05%	▼13.15
Turnout		6,303	9.96%	▼22.47
Registered electors		63,272		▲22.44
JKNC hold		Swing	▼4.26	

=== Assembly Election 1996 ===
1996 Jammu and Kashmir Legislative Assembly election : Sonawar
Party	Candidate	Votes	%	±%
JKNC	Ghulam Mohammed Bawan	9,873	58.92%	New
JD	Bashir Ahmad Kuthoo	3,137	18.72%	New
INC	Sheikh Ghulam Qadir Pardesi	2,783	16.61%	New
JKNPP	Abdul Rashid Lone	572	3.41%	New
Independent	Hafiza Begum	307	1.83%	New
Margin of victory		6,736	40.20%	
Turnout		16,757	34.50%	
Registered electors		51,675		
JKNC win (new seat)				

== See also ==
- Sonwar Bagh
