= Mohammad Shafi Bhat =

Indian politician

Mohammad Shafi Bhat (1945–2016) was a politician from the Indian state of Jammu and Kashmir, who belonged to the National Conference political party, and was elected as the Member of Parliament from Srinagar Lok Sabha constituency in 1989. In the 1996 Assembly elections he represented the Amirakadal seat. He later joined the Indian National Congress in 2002. By 2008, he had returned to the National Conference. He died on 12 October 2016 due to a prolonged illness.

Lok Sabha
| Preceded by Abdul Rashid Kabuli | Member of Parliament for Srinagar; 1989–1991 | Succeeded by Vacant (Elections not held) |
