= Pulwama Assembly constituency =

Constituency of the Jammu and Kashmir Legislative Assembly

Coordinates: 33.87°N 74.90°E

Pulwama
- Constituency No. 34 for the Jammu and Kashmir Legislative Assembly

Constituency details
- Country: India
- State: Jammu and Kashmir
- District: Pulwama
- Lok Sabha constituency: Srinagar
- Established: 1962

Member of Legislative Assembly
- Incumbent Waheed Ur Rehman Para
- Party: JKPDP
- Elected year: 2024

Pulwama Assembly constituency is one of the 90 constituencies in the Jammu and Kashmir Legislative Assembly of Jammu and Kashmir a north state of India. Pulwama is also part of Srinagar Lok Sabha constituency.

== Members of the Legislative Assembly ==
Election	Member	Party
1962	Sanaullah Sheikh	Jammu and Kashmir National Conference
1967	Sonaullah Dar	Indian National Congress
1972	Sonaullah Dar	Indian National Congress
1977	Mohammad Ibrahim Dar	Jammu and Kashmir National Conference
1983	Mohammad Ibrahim Dar	Jammu and Kashmir National Conference
1987	Bashir Ahmed Nengroo	Jammu and Kashmir National Conference
1996	Bashir Ahmed Nengroo	Jammu and Kashmir National Conference
2002	Mohammad Khalil Band	Jammu and Kashmir Peoples Democratic Party
2008	Mohammad Khalil Band	Jammu and Kashmir Peoples Democratic Party
2014	Mohammad Khalil Band	Jammu and Kashmir Peoples Democratic Party
2024	Waheed Ur Rehman Para	Jammu and Kashmir Peoples Democratic Party

== Election results ==
=== Assembly Election 2024 ===
2024 Jammu and Kashmir Legislative Assembly election : Pulwama
Party	Candidate	Votes	%	±%
JKPDP	Waheed Ur Rehman Para	24,716	48.94%	▲10.39
JKNC	Mohammad Khalil Band	16,568	32.81%	New
Independent	Talat Majid Alie	1,833	3.63%	New
AAP	Fayaz Ahmad Sofi	1,224	2.42%	New
Independent	Sofi Mohammad Akbar	1,117	2.21%	New
Independent	Mohammed Ayoub Mir	1,052	2.08%	New
Independent	Mohammed Iqbal Sofi	871	1.72%	New
NOTA	None of the Above	1,095	2.17%	▲1.21
Margin of victory		8,148	16.13%	▲12.71
Turnout		50,499	50.72%	▲12.62
Registered electors		99,555		▲25.74
JKPDP hold		Swing	▲10.39	

=== Assembly Election 2014 ===
2014 Jammu and Kashmir Legislative Assembly election : Pulwama
Party	Candidate	Votes	%	±%
JKPDP	Mohammad Khalil Bandh	11,631	38.55%	▲2.10
JKNC	Ghulam Nabi Ratanpuri	10,599	35.13%	▲24.01
JKPDF	Abdul Qayoom Mir	1,850	6.13%	New
Independent	Sana Ullah Dar	1,760	5.83%	New
INC	Bashir Ahmad Magrey	1,558	5.16%	New
BJP	Riyaz Ahmad Mir	672	2.23%	New
Independent	Bashir Ahmad Malik	669	2.22%	New
NOTA	None of the Above	289	0.96%	New
Margin of victory		1,032	3.42%	▼19.31
Turnout		30,168	38.10%	▼2.74
Registered electors		79,175		▲10.79
JKPDP hold		Swing	▲2.10	

=== Assembly Election 2008 ===
2008 Jammu and Kashmir Legislative Assembly election : Pulwama
Party	Candidate	Votes	%	±%
JKPDP	Mohammad Khalil Bandh	10,639	36.45%	▼16.64
Independent	Sonaullah Dar	4,003	13.71%	New
JKNC	Ghulam Nabi Ratanpuri	3,246	11.12%	▼17.23
Independent	Mohammad Maqbool Baht	3,202	10.97%	New
Independent	Bashir Ahmad Nengroo	2,318	7.94%	New
JKPDF	Abdul Qayoom Mir	1,643	5.63%	New
Jammu & Kashmir Democratic Party Nationalist	Javaid Abdullah Mir	849	2.91%	New
Margin of victory		6,636	22.74%	▼2.00
Turnout		29,188	40.84%	▲22.71
Registered electors		71,466		▲32.08
JKPDP hold		Swing	▼16.64	

=== Assembly Election 2002 ===
2002 Jammu and Kashmir Legislative Assembly election : Pulwama
Party	Candidate	Votes	%	±%
JKPDP	Mohammad Khalil Bandh	5,209	53.09%	New
JKNC	Bashir Ahmad Nengroo	2,782	28.36%	▼24.10
INC	Mohamad Maqbool Bhat	1,143	11.65%	▲0.82
Independent	Abdul Gani Bhat	409	4.17%	New
JKNPP	Nazir Ahmad Lone	135	1.38%	New
JD(U)	Manzoor Ahmad Thoker	133	1.36%	New
Margin of victory		2,427	24.74%	▲4.54
Turnout		9,811	18.13%	▼28.52
Registered electors		54,107		▲10.06
JKPDP gain from JKNC		Swing	▲0.64	

=== Assembly Election 1996 ===
1996 Jammu and Kashmir Legislative Assembly election : Pulwama
Party	Candidate	Votes	%	±%
JKNC	Bashir Ahmad Nengroo	12,030	52.46%	▼7.11
JD	Syed Bashir Ahmad	7,398	32.26%	New
INC	Abdul Gani Bhat	2,483	10.83%	New
JKAL	Mohammed Yousuf Wani	1,022	4.46%	New
Margin of victory		4,632	20.20%	▼1.25
Turnout		22,933	51.31%	▼32.82
Registered electors		49,162		▼0.10
JKNC hold		Swing	▼7.11	

=== Assembly Election 1987 ===
1987 Jammu and Kashmir Legislative Assembly election : Pulwama
Party	Candidate	Votes	%	±%
JKNC	Bashir Ahmed Nengroo	23,297	59.57%	▲8.41
Independent	Mushtaq Ahmed	14,910	38.12%	New
CPI	Bashir Ahmed	902	2.31%	New
Margin of victory		8,387	21.45%	▼12.81
Turnout		39,109	80.99%	▲2.10
Registered electors		49,212		▲24.02
JKNC hold		Swing		

=== Assembly Election 1983 ===
1983 Jammu and Kashmir Legislative Assembly election : Pulwama
Party	Candidate	Votes	%	±%
JKNC	Sana Ullah Dar	15,707	51.16%	▼21.42
INC	Mohammed Ayub	5,189	16.90%	▲12.29
Independent	Mohammed Ibrahim Dar	4,353	14.18%	New
JI	Assadullah	2,651	8.63%	▼1.21
Independent	Ghulam Qadir Mir	1,705	5.55%	New
JKNC	Ghulam Rasool	568	1.85%	▼70.73
Independent	Mir Abdul Rahim	529	1.72%	New
Margin of victory		10,518	34.26%	▼28.48
Turnout		30,702	80.46%	▲7.42
Registered electors		39,682		▲7.68
JKNC hold		Swing	▼21.42	

=== Assembly Election 1977 ===
1977 Jammu and Kashmir Legislative Assembly election : Pulwama
Party	Candidate	Votes	%	±%
JKNC	Mohammad Ibrahim Dar	18,712	72.58%	New
JI	Abdul Kashid Wani	2,537	9.84%	▼9.02
JP	Mohammad Shafi Simnani	1,853	7.19%	New
Independent	Ghulam Mohammad Mir (Muran)	1,489	5.78%	New
INC	Ghulam Mohammad Mir (Rajpuri)	1,189	4.61%	▼46.48
Margin of victory		16,175	62.74%	▲37.08
Turnout		25,780	73.27%	▲2.30
Registered electors		36,853		▲27.36
JKNC gain from INC		Swing	▲21.49	

=== Assembly Election 1972 ===
1972 Jammu and Kashmir Legislative Assembly election : Pulwama
Party	Candidate	Votes	%	±%
INC	Sona Ullah Dar	10,002	51.09%	New
Independent	Ghulam Hassan Mir	4,978	25.43%	New
JI	Qhulam Ahmad	3,692	18.86%	New
Independent	Abdul Aziz	490	2.50%	New
Independent	Omkar Nath	414	2.11%	New
Margin of victory		5,024	25.66%	
Turnout		19,576	72.55%	▲67.65
Registered electors		28,937		▲4.44
INC hold		Swing		

=== Assembly Election 1967 ===
1967 Jammu and Kashmir Legislative Assembly election : Pulwama
Party	Candidate	Votes	%	±%
INC	Sanaullah Sheikh	Unopposed		
Registered electors		27,706		▲7.33
INC gain from JKNC		Swing		

=== Assembly Election 1962 ===
1962 Jammu and Kashmir Legislative Assembly election : Pulwama
Party	Candidate	Votes	%	±%
JKNC	Sanaullah Sheikh	Unopposed		
Registered electors		25,815		
JKNC win (new seat)				

== See also ==
- Pampore
- List of constituencies of Jammu and Kashmir Legislative Assembly
