= Lal Chowk Assembly constituency =

Constituency of the Jammu and Kashmir legislative assembly in India

Lal Chowk
- Constituency No. 22 for the Jammu and Kashmir Legislative Assembly

Constituency details
- Country: India
- State: Jammu and Kashmir
- District: Srinagar
- Lok Sabha constituency: Srinagar
- Established: 2022
- Reservation: None

Member of Legislative Assembly
- Incumbent Sheikh Ahsan Ahmed
- Party: Jammu and Kashmir National Conference
- Elected year: 2024

Lal Chowk Assembly constituency is an assembly constituency in the Jammu and Kashmir Legislative Assembly.

== Members of Legislative Assembly ==
Year	Member	Party
2024	Sheikh Ahsan Ahmed	Jammu and Kashmir National Conference

== Election results ==
=== Assembly Election 2024 ===
2024 Jammu and Kashmir Legislative Assembly election : Lal Chowk
Party	Candidate	Votes	%	±%
JKNC	Sheikh Ahsan Ahmed	16,731	45.45%	New
JKAP	Mohammad Ashraf Mir	5,388	14.64%	New
JKPDP	Zuhaib Yousf Mir	4,966	13.49%	New
Independent	Manzoor Ahmad Bhat	4,475	12.16%	New
BJP	Aijaz Hussain Rather	3,881	8.91%	New
Independent	Gazanfar Ali	461	1.25%	New
JKANC	Abdul Rashid Haroon	374	1.02%	New
NOTA	None of the Above	585	1.59%	New
Margin of victory		11,343	30.81%	
Turnout		36,811	34.34%	
Registered electors		1,07,199		
JKNC win (new seat)				
