= Mohammad Yousuf Bhat =

Indian politician (born 1948)

Mohammad Yousuf Bhat (born 1948) is an Indian politician from Jammu and Kashmir. He is a former MLA from Shopian Assembly constituency in Shopian district. He won the 2014 Jammu and Kashmir Legislative Assembly election representing the Jammu and Kashmir People's Democratic Party.

== Early life and education ==
Bhat is from Shopian, Shopian district, Jammu and Kashmir. He is the son of late Mohammad Ahsan Bhat. He is an advocate and his wife is a government teacher. After completing his B.Sc., he did his L.L.B. in 1972 at Aligarh Muslim University.

== Electoral performance ==
Election	Constituency	Party	Result	Votes %	Opposition Candidate	Opposition Party	Opposition vote %	Ref
2014	Shopian	JKPDP	Won	34.20%	Shabir Ahmad Kullay	Independent	28.52%	

== Career ==
Bhat won from Shopian Assembly constituency representing the Jammu and Kashmir People's Democratic Party in the 2014 Jammu and Kashmir Legislative Assembly election. He polled 14,262 votes and defeated his nearest rival, Shabir Ahmad Kullay, an independent candidate, by a margin of 2,366 votes.
