= Eidgah Assembly constituency =

Constituency of the Jammu and Kashmir Legislative Assembly

Coordinates: 33.997°N 74.872°E

Eidgah
- Constituency No. 25 for the Jammu and Kashmir Legislative Assembly

Constituency details
- Country: India
- State: Jammu and Kashmir
- District: Srinagar
- Lok Sabha constituency: Srinagar
- Established: 1977

Member of Legislative Assembly
- Incumbent Mubarak Gul
- Party: Jammu and Kashmir National Conference
- Elected year: 2024

Eidgah Assembly constituency is one of the 90 constituencies in the Jammu and Kashmir Legislative Assembly of Jammu and Kashmir a north state of India. Eidgah is also part of Srinagar Lok Sabha constituency.

== Members of the Legislative Assembly ==
Election	Member	Party
1977	Abdul Rashid Kabli	Janata Party
1983	Mubarak Gul	Jammu and Kashmir National Conference
1987	Mohammad Shafi Khan	Jammu and Kashmir National Conference
1996	Mubarak Gul	Jammu and Kashmir National Conference
2002	Mubarak Gul	Jammu and Kashmir National Conference
2008	Mubarak Gul	Jammu and Kashmir National Conference
2014	Mubarak Gul	Jammu and Kashmir National Conference
2024	Mubarak Gul	Jammu and Kashmir National Conference

== Election results ==
=== Assembly Election 2024 ===
2024 Jammu and Kashmir Legislative Assembly election : Eidgah
Party	Candidate	Votes	%	±%
JKNC	Mubarak Ahmed Gul	7,700	33.50%	New
Independent	Ghulam Nabi Bhat	6,020	26.19%	New
JKPDP	Mohammad Khurshid Alam	3,302	14.37%	▼23.29
JKPC	Irfan Ahmad Mattoo	1,285	5.59%	▲3.24
Independent	Imtiyaz Ahmad Khan	957	4.16%	New
Independent	Shakeel Ahmad Dar	741	3.22%	New
Independent	Irfan Ahmad Shah	712	3.10%	New
BJP	Arif Majeed Pampore	479	2.08%	New
Independent	Mohammad Faheem Reshi	470	2.04%	New
JKAP	Mohammad Ashraf Bhat Palpori	442	1.92%	New
NOTA	None of the Above	404	1.76%	▲0.68
Margin of victory		1,680	7.31%	▲3.59
Turnout		22,985	37.14%	▲9.34
Registered electors		61,885		▲5.21
JKNC gain from JKNC		Swing	▼7.88	

=== Assembly Election 2014 ===
2014 Jammu and Kashmir Legislative Assembly election : Eidgah
Party	Candidate	Votes	%	±%
JKNC	Mubarak Ahmed Gul	6,766	41.38%	▲5.40
JKPDP	Ali Mohammad Wani	6,158	37.66%	▲15.24
INC	Imtiyaz Ahmad Khan	1,274	7.79%	▲5.13
Independent	Fayaz Ahmad Bhat	1,238	7.57%	New
JKPC	Irfan Ahmad Mattoo	385	2.35%	New
Independent	Mehraj Ud Din Bhat	213	1.30%	New
NOTA	None of the Above	177	1.08%	New
Margin of victory		608	3.72%	▼9.83
Turnout		16,352	27.80%	▲5.73
Registered electors		58,822		▲4.76
JKNC hold		Swing	▲5.40	

=== Assembly Election 2008 ===
2008 Jammu and Kashmir Legislative Assembly election : Eidgah
Party	Candidate	Votes	%	±%
JKNC	Mubarak Ahmed Gul	4,457	35.97%	▼24.65
JKPDP	Asifa Tariq Qara	2,778	22.42%	New
Independent	Ali Mohammad Wani	1,916	15.46%	New
Jammu & Kashmir Democratic Party Nationalist	Ghulam Nabi Bhat	862	6.96%	New
Independent	Bakshi Mohammad Ashraf	576	4.65%	New
Independent	Ghulam Mohammad Wani	565	4.56%	New
INC	Abdul Gani Khan	330	2.66%	▼9.16
Independent	Aasif Sidiq Ronga	257	2.07%	New
JKANC	Tauseef Ahmad Shah (Buchh)	225	1.82%	New
Independent	Mehraj-Ud-Din Bhat	138	1.11%	New
Independent	Mufti Nazeem-Ud-Din	84	0.68%	New
Margin of victory		1,679	13.55%	▼24.72
Turnout		12,390	22.07%	▲17.32
Registered electors		56,150		▼20.21
JKNC hold		Swing	▼24.65	

=== Assembly Election 2002 ===
2002 Jammu and Kashmir Legislative Assembly election : Eidgah
Party	Candidate	Votes	%	±%
JKNC	Mubarak Ahmed Gul	2,026	60.62%	▼17.50
Independent	Mohammed Ashraf Bakashi	747	22.35%	New
INC	Abdul Gani Khan	395	11.82%	New
BJP	Abdul Khaliq Bhat	90	2.69%	New
JKNPP	Romesh Lal	84	2.51%	▼3.45
Margin of victory		1,279	38.27%	▼30.00
Turnout		3,342	4.75%	▼14.06
Registered electors		70,372		▲26.03
JKNC hold		Swing	▼17.50	

=== Assembly Election 1996 ===
1996 Jammu and Kashmir Legislative Assembly election : Eidgah
Party	Candidate	Votes	%	±%
JKNC	Mubarak Ahmed Gul	8,206	78.12%	▲7.72
JD	Farooq Ahmad	1,035	9.85%	New
Independent	Abdul Rashid Kabuli	637	6.06%	New
JKNPP	Bhim Singh	626	5.96%	New
Margin of victory		7,171	68.27%	▲26.97
Turnout		10,504	20.01%	▼56.67
Registered electors		55,838		▲10.29
JKNC hold		Swing	▲7.72	

=== Assembly Election 1987 ===
1987 Jammu and Kashmir Legislative Assembly election : Eidgah
Party	Candidate	Votes	%	±%
JKNC	Mohammed Shafi Khan	26,904	70.41%	▼23.47
Independent	Bashir Ahmed	11,122	29.11%	New
Margin of victory		15,782	41.30%	▼49.29
Turnout		38,212	76.63%	▼10.42
Registered electors		50,627		▲11.02
JKNC hold		Swing		

=== Assembly Election 1983 ===
1983 Jammu and Kashmir Legislative Assembly election : Eidgah
Party	Candidate	Votes	%	±%
JKNC	Mubarak Ahmed Gul	36,769	93.87%	▲46.70
INC	Ghulam Mohammed Misgar	1,285	3.28%	New
Independent	Mohmad Ashraf Aram	420	1.07%	New
JI	Ghulam Nabi Nowshehri	267	0.68%	New
Independent	Abdul Rashid Wadoo	258	0.66%	New
Margin of victory		35,484	90.59%	▲84.93
Turnout		39,169	86.63%	▲6.54
Registered electors		45,600		▲4.73
JKNC gain from JP		Swing	▲41.04	

=== Assembly Election 1977 ===
1977 Jammu and Kashmir Legislative Assembly election : Eidgah
Party	Candidate	Votes	%	±%
JP	Abdul Rashid Kabuli	18,255	52.83%	New
JKNC	Ghulam Rasool Rashi	16,298	47.17%	New
Margin of victory		1,957	5.66%	
Turnout		34,553	80.77%	
Registered electors		43,541		
JP win (new seat)				

== See also ==
- Srinagar
- List of constituencies of Jammu and Kashmir Legislative Assembly
