= S. A. Shamim =

Indian politician

S. A. Shamim was a politician from the Indian state of Jammu and Kashmir. He served in the 5th Lok Sabha, and was elected as an independent from the Srinagar Lok Sabha constituency.

== Electoral performance ==
Election	Constituency	Party	Result	Votes %	Opposition Candidate	Opposition Party	Opposition vote %	Ref
1967	Shopian	Independent	Won	45.70%	G. H. Khan	INC	37.37%	

Lok Sabha
Preceded by Bakshi Ghulam Mohammad	Member of Parliament for Srinagar; 1971–1977	Succeeded by Begum Akbar Jehan Abdullah
