= Mohammad Yasin Shah =

Kashmiri politician (c.1950–2020)

Member of the Jammu and Kashmir Legislative Assembly
- In office 2002–2014
- Governor: Narinder Nath Vohra, Srinivas Kumar Sinha
- Chief Minister: Omar Abdullah, Farooq Abdullah
- Constituency: Sonawar

Member Jammu and Kashmir Legislative Assembly
- In office 1987–1996
- Governor: K. V. Krishna Rao
- Chief Minister: Farooq Abdullah
- Constituency: Hazratbal

Personal details
- Born: c. 1950
- Died: April 23, 2020 (aged 69–70) Jammu and Kashmir
- Party: Jammu and Kashmir National Conference

Mohammad Yasin Shah (c. 1950 – 23 April 2020) was an Indian politician and the former member of the Jammu and Kashmir Legislative Assembly. A member of Jammu and Kashmir National Conference, he started his political career from Hazratbal constituency in 1987 and later, represented Sonawar constituency in 1996 and subsequently served as political adviser to the then chief minister, Farooq Abdullah. Prior to his participation in assembly elections, he served as councillor of the Srinagar Municipal Corporation.

In 2002, he was again elected from the Sonawari constituency. In 2009, Farooq Abdullah was elected as the member of parliament, making the constituency become vacant in 2009 and he retained his position again via by-election.
