= Abdul Rahim Rather (born 1944) =

Indian politician

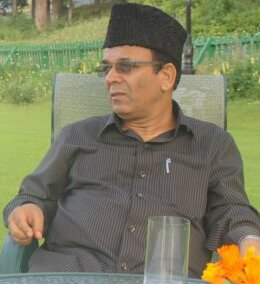

Speaker of the Jammu and Kashmir Legislative Assembly
- Incumbent
- Assumed office 4 November 2024
- Deputy: vacant
- Leader of the House: Omar Abdullah
- Preceded by: Nirmal Kumar Singh
- Constituency: Charari Sharif

Member of the Jammu and Kashmir Legislative Assembly
- Incumbent
- Assumed office 8 October 2024
- Preceded by: Ghulam Nabi Lone
- Constituency: Charari Sharif
- In office 1977–2014
- Succeeded by: Ghulam Nabi Lone
- Constituency: Charari Sharif

Personal details
- Born: 7 May 1944 (age 82) Badipora, Jammu and Kashmir, British India
- Citizenship: Indian
- Party: Jammu & Kashmir National Conference
- Education: University of Kashmir (B. A 1968); Aligarh Muslim University (LL.B 1971)
- Occupation: Politician

Abdul Rahim Rather (born 7 May 1944) is an Indian politician from Jammu and Kashmir. He is currently serving as the speaker of Jammu and Kashmir Legislative Assembly. He is a seven time MLA representing the Jammu and Kashmir National Conference Party from Charar-i-Sharief Assembly constituency in Budgam district. He has served as a speaker and held several important ministries including finance in the previous National Conference governments.

== Early life and education ==
Rather was born in Badipora village of Chadoora, Budgam district, Jammu and Kashmir. His father Ghulam Qadir Rather was a farmer. He completed his post graduation in political science in 1968 at University of Kashmir and later did L.L.B. in 1971 at Aligarh Muslim University. His son runs a software company.

== Career ==
Rather first won the 1977 Jammu and Kashmir Legislative Assembly election from Charar-i-Sharief Assembly constituency as a candidate of Jammu and Kashmir National Conference. He was later elected for another five terms consecutively winning the 1983, 1987, 1996, 2002 and 2008 elections. In 2014 Jammu and Kashmir Legislative Assembly election, he lost to Ghulam Nabi Lone of JKPDP to end his over 30 years hold on the constituency.

In 2024 Jammu and Kashmir Legislative Assembly elections, he was elected for his 7th term in Jammu and Kashmir's legislature.

== Electoral performance ==
Election	Constituency	Party	Result	Votes %	Opposition Candidate	Opposition Party	Opposition vote %	Ref
2024	Charari Sharief	JKNC	Won	48.48%	Ghulam Nabi Lone	JKPDP	32.98%	
2014	Charari Sharief	JKNC	Lost	42.85%	Ghulam Nabi Lone	JKPDP	50.85%	
2008	Charari Sharief	JKNC	Won	48.30%	Ghulam Nabi Lone	JKPDP	35.78%	
2002	Charari Sharief	JKNC	Won	51.29%	Ghulam Nabi Lone	JKPDP	41.79%	
1996	Charari Sharief	JKNC	Won	60.31%	Ghulam Hassan Wani	JD	19.69%	
1987	Charari Sharief	JKNC	Won	82.94%	Abdul Rashid	Independent	9.98%	
1983	Charari Sharief	JKNC	Won	69.79%	Abdul Qayoom	INC	25.93%	
1977	Charari Sharief	JKNC	Won	71.96%	Abdul Qayoom	INC	23.22%	
