= Waheed Para =

Indian politician

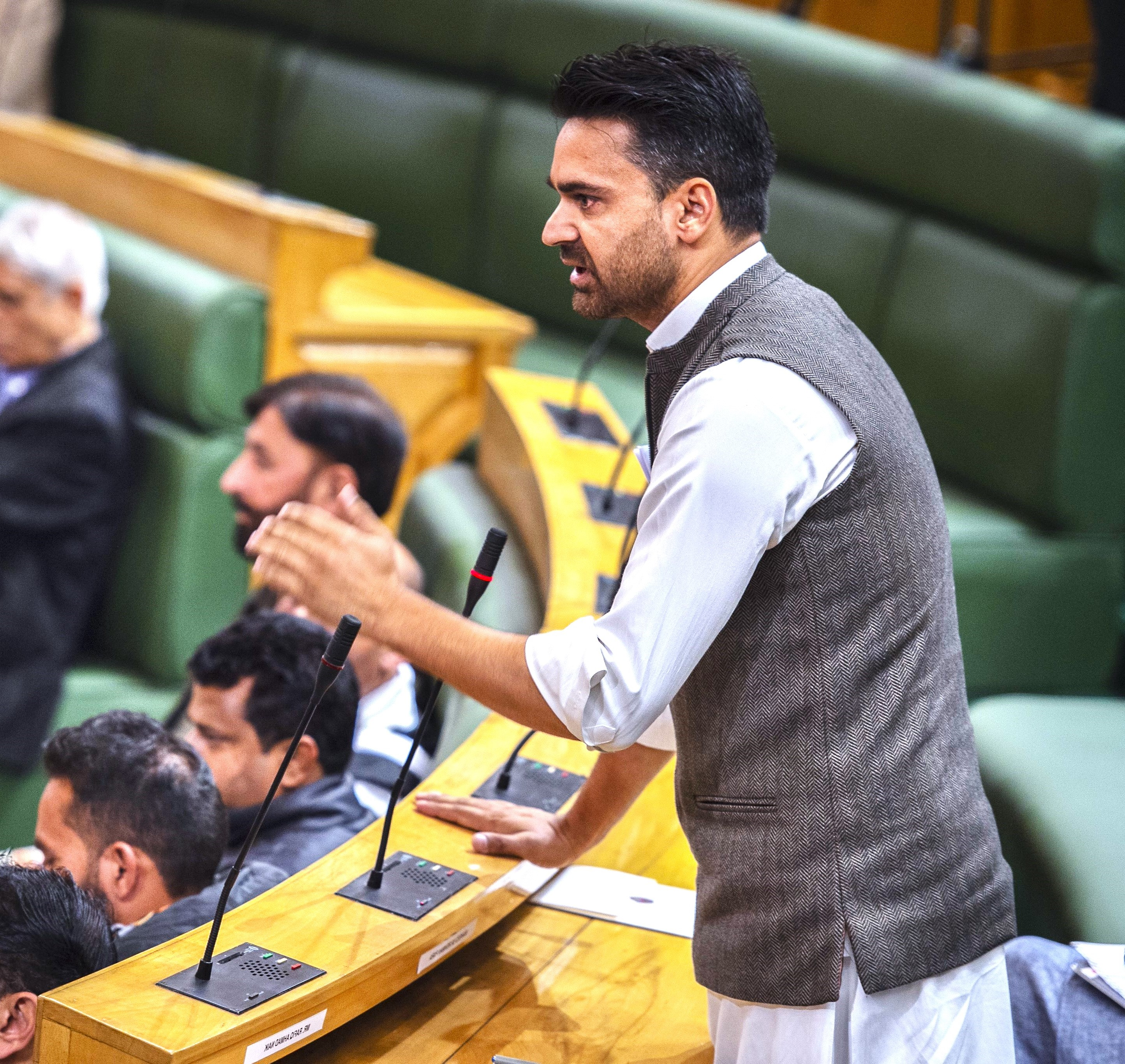
- Waheed Para

Leader of Jammu and Kashmir People's Democratic Party in Jammu and Kashmir Legislative Assembly
- Incumbent
- Assumed office 14 November 2024
- Preceded by: Mehbooba Mufti

Member of Jammu and Kashmir Legislative Assembly
- Incumbent
- Assumed office 8 October 2024
- Preceded by: Mohammad Khalil Bandh
- Constituency: Pulwama

Youth Wing President Jammu and Kashmir People's Democratic Party
- In office January 2013 – October 2024
- President: Mehbooba Mufti
- Succeeded by: Aditya Gupta

Secretary, J&K Sports Council
- In office July 2016 – June 2018

Personal details
- Born: 24 September 1988 (age 38) Naira, Pulwama
- Party: Jammu and Kashmir Peoples Democratic Party
- Education: Boston University, Islamic University of Science & Technology

Waheed ur Rehman Para (وحید اررحمان پارہ) is an Indian politician of Jammu and Kashmir People's Democratic Party and member of the Jammu and Kashmir Legislative Assembly (MLA) from the Pulwama constituency. He is currently the party's legislative party leader in the J&K assembly.

Coming from south Kashmir's Pulwama district, Para joined the Jammu and Kashmir People's Democratic Party in 2013 and was subsequently appointed its youth wing president. In the following years, he served as the political analyst to then chief minister Mufti Mohammad Sayeed in 2015 and as secretary J&K Sports Council during 2016–2018.

He was arrested by National Investigation Agency on 25 November 2020 for alleged terror links, and was again rearrested by J&K Police after receiving bail from Special NIA Court. Waheed was released on bail by the Jammu and Kashmir High Court in May 2022, and was also selected as the inaugural Yale Peace Fellow at Yale University's International Leadership Center in 2023.

== Political career ==
Waheed was informally associated with Jammu and Kashmir People's Democratic Party (PDP) since 2002. He formally joined the party in 2013 and was appointed as its Youth Wing President soon afterwards.

He is credited with playing a major role in the party's electoral success in 2014 parliamentary and state assembly elections. He became a political analyst to then chief minister Mufti Mohammad Sayeed. He served as the secretary of Jammu and Kashmir State Sports Council between 2016 and 2018. In 2018 he survived an attack on his life after terrorists closely fired at his vehicle in central Kashmir's Budgam district. He was a fellow of the International Visitor Leadership Program (IVLP) at the invitation of the U.S. Government. Para had also been invited to the Australia-India Youth Dialogue (AIYD) 2019.

Following his arrest by the National Investigation Agency in 2020, he was elected to the Pulwama district development council in 2020 while still being in custody. After incarceration for 17 months, he was granted bail by the Jammu and Kashmir High Court, which observed the evidence against him to be "too sketchy to be believed prima facie."

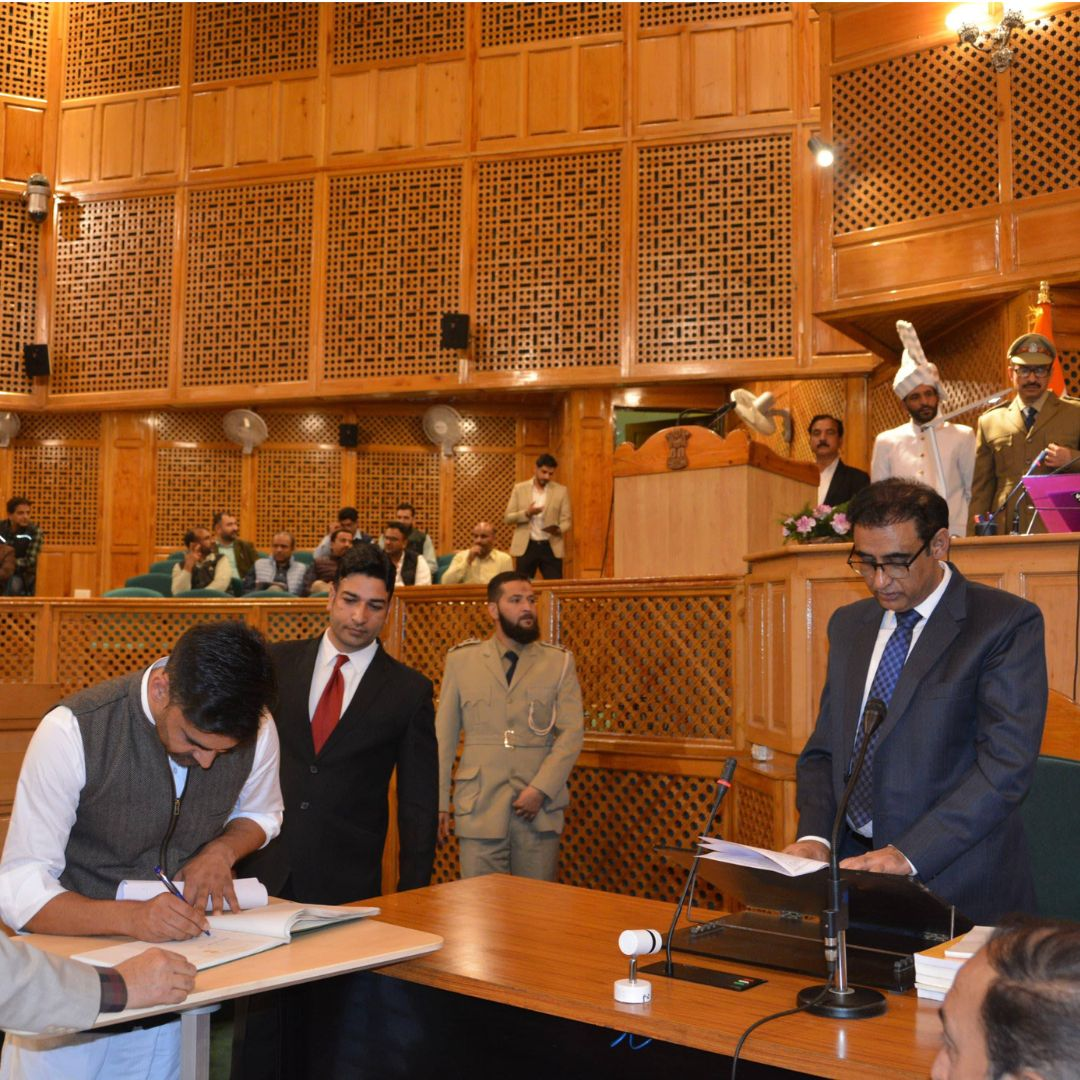
Waheed Para signing papers after taking oath in Jammu and Kashmir Legislative Assembly at Srinagar (2024)

Para contested the 2024 Indian general election from the Srinagar Parliamentary Constituency, and secured the runner up position with 1.68 lakh votes. He won the 2024 Jammu and Kashmir Legislative Assembly elections from Pulwama.

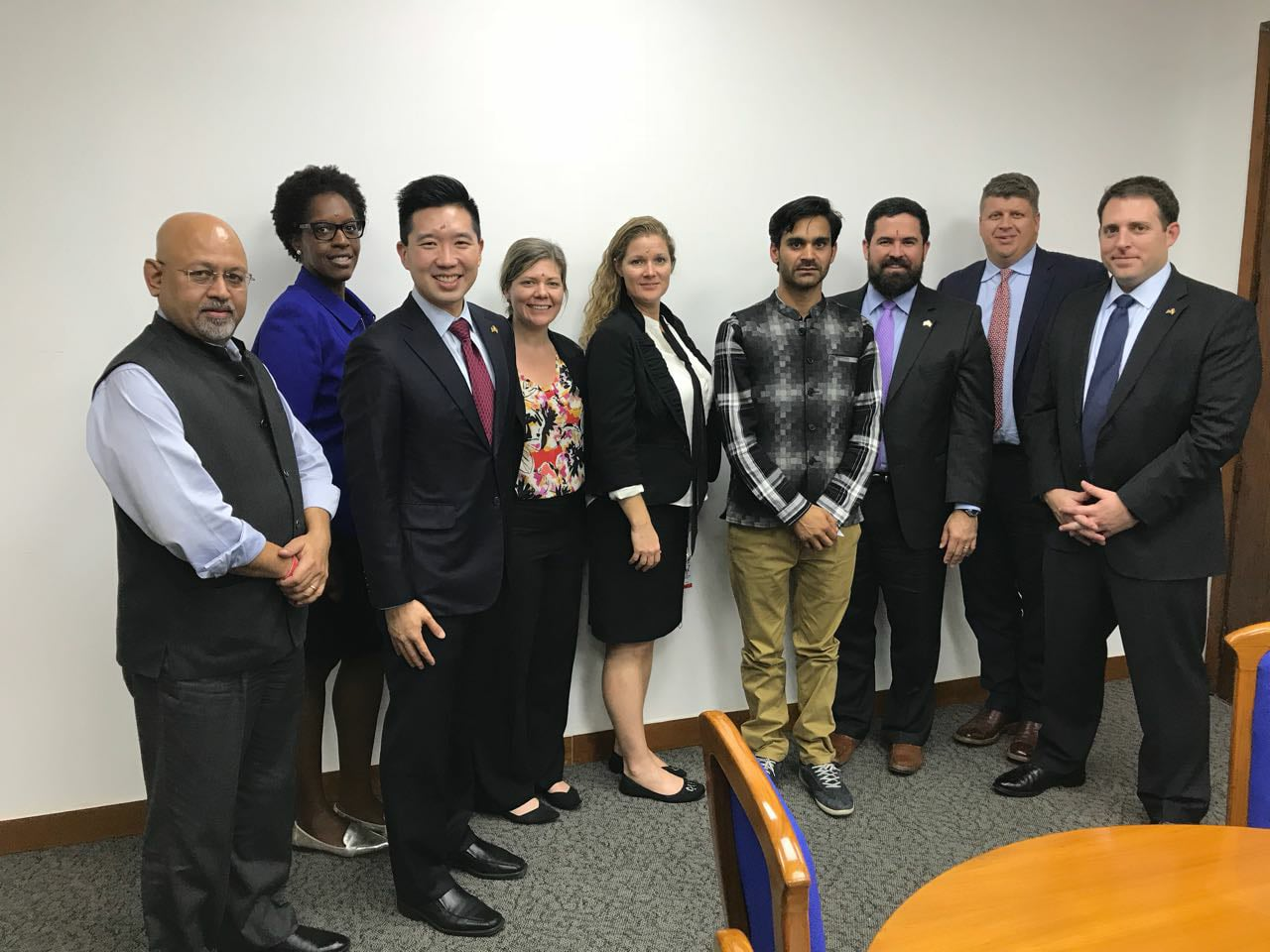
Waheed Para poses with the delegation of American Council of Young Political Leaders after an interaction at New Delhi (2016)

Among his first actions as a legislator was the introduction of a resolution condemening the revocation of J&K's special status (Article 370) on the first day of assembly session. It called for a "restoration of special status and all constitutional guarantees granted to Jammu and Kashmir in their original, pristine form". In November 2024, he was appointed the legislative party leader of PDP in the J&K Assembly, the youngest leader to have achieved such a position.

== Land regularisation bill 2025 ==
Among the major legislations brought in by him in his first year as Member of Legislative Assembly was The Regularization and Recognition of Property Rights Bill in the Jammu and Kashmir Legislative Assembly, a land-regularisation initiative aimed at protecting poor families who had been living on State, Kahcharai, Common and Shamilat land for over two decades. Para stated that the Bill recognised long-term occupants not as “encroachers” but as citizens with a constitutional right to shelter under Article 21.

The proposed legislation sought to provide a one-time compassionate measure to prevent demolitions and displacement by granting ownership rights to these families. It aimed to bring long-established settlements into the legal system by enabling access to property registration, documentation, bank loans and formal recognition of homes that had existed for decades.

The Bill was ultimately rejected by the Assembly. Both the ruling National Conference (NC) and the opposition Bharatiya Janata Party (BJP) voted against it. Chief Minister Omar Abdullah opposed the proposal, arguing that it would “help the land mafia”, while the BJP labelled it “land jihad” and praised the government for blocking what it called the PDP’s “nefarious designs”.

== Detention ==
Waheed was first arrested on 4 August 2019, as the Government of India moved to abrogate Article 370. Like other mainstream political leaders in the region, Parra was initially detained at the SKICC and the MLA's hostel in Srinagar, before being placed under house arrest.

On 26 November 2020, two days after filing his nomination papers for the District Development Council (DDC) elections, Parra was arrested by the National Investigation Agency (NIA). Despite being in custody, he won the DDC elections in 2020. Shortly after being granted bail by the Special NIA Court in Jammu, Parra was re-arrested by the Jammu and Kashmir Police.

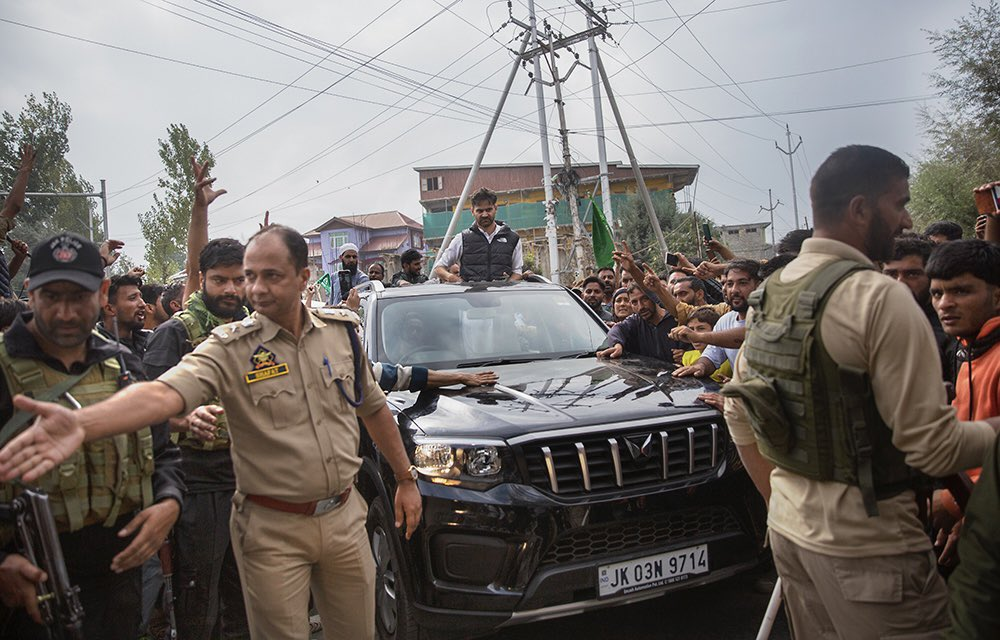
J&K Police clear the way for PDP leader Waheed Para as he arrives to collect winning certificate at Pulwama (2024)

During his detention, he was reportedly subjected to harsh interrogation conditions, including being kept in freezing temperatures. Allegations of abusive interrogations lasting up to 12 hours surfaced, with Parra being questioned about his participation in a virtual meeting with United Nations Security Council members, where he had raised concerns regarding the Government of India’s actions in Jammu and Kashmir and border tensions with China. In July 2021, five Special Rapporteurs of the United Nations sought an official reply from the Government of India on reports of torture meted out to him. The report highlighted serious accusations, including the claim that "Para had been held in a dark underground cell at subzero temperatures, deprived of sleep, and subjected to physical abuse, including being kicked, slapped, beaten with rods, and hung upside down. His alleged ill-treatment was documented, and he was reportedly required to meet with medical professionals due to the severity of the torture." Waheed was eventually shifted to Srinagar's Central Jail, where he remained incarcerated for over 17 months. His release came after the High Court of Jammu and Kashmir and Ladakh granted him bail, stating that the evidence presented by the prosecution was "too sketchy" to justify his continued detention.

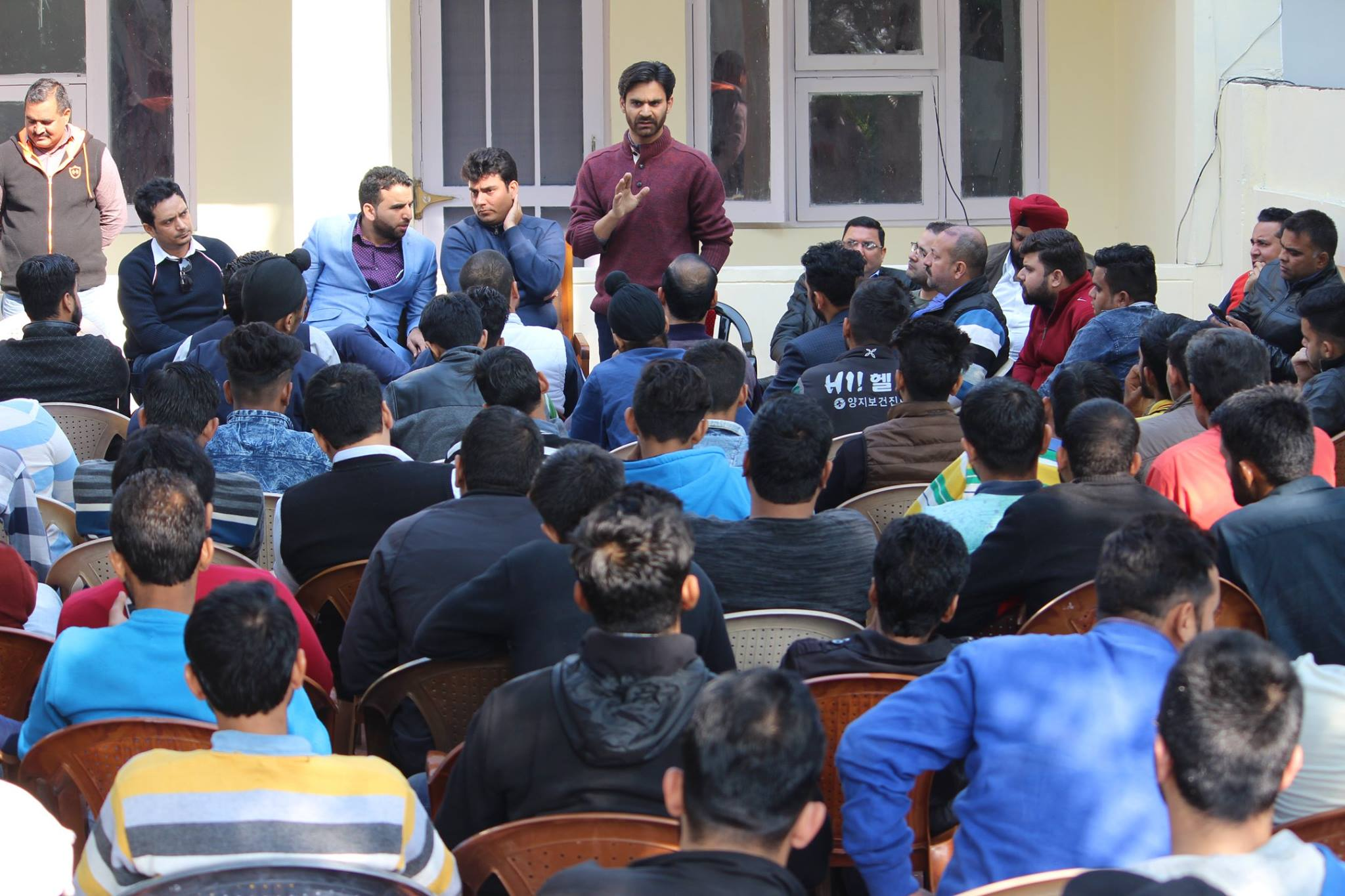
Waheed Para addressing supporters at Jammu in 2018

Despite being granted bail, he was disallowed to accompany his cancer hit father for treatment outside Jammu and Kashmir alongside not being allowed to also accompany his 8 year old nephew for treatment at AIIMS Delhi in 2023 - 2024 after repeated pleas, both of whom expired in month's time from each other.

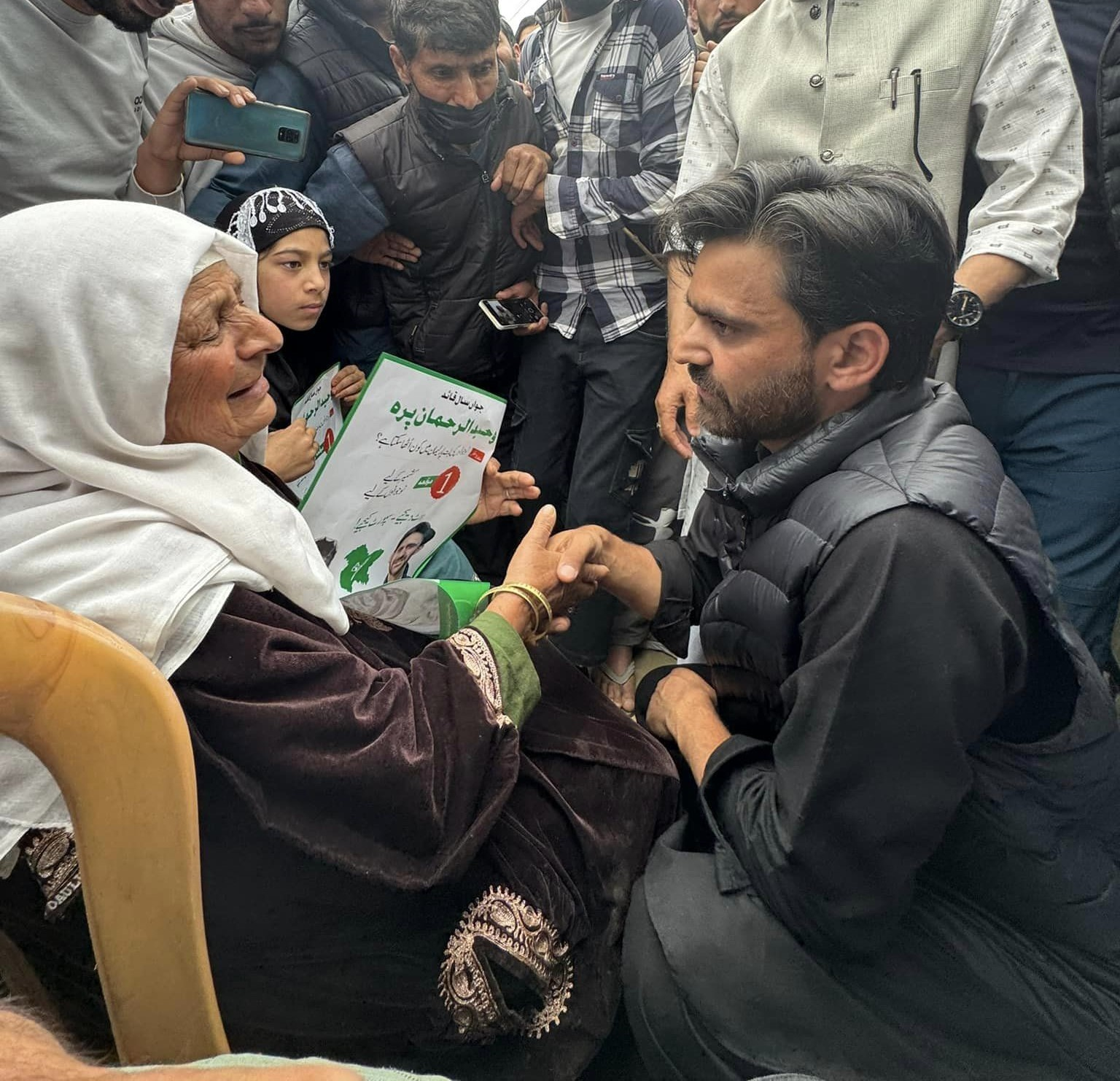
Waheed Para during 2024 Lok Sabha election campaigning at Pulwama

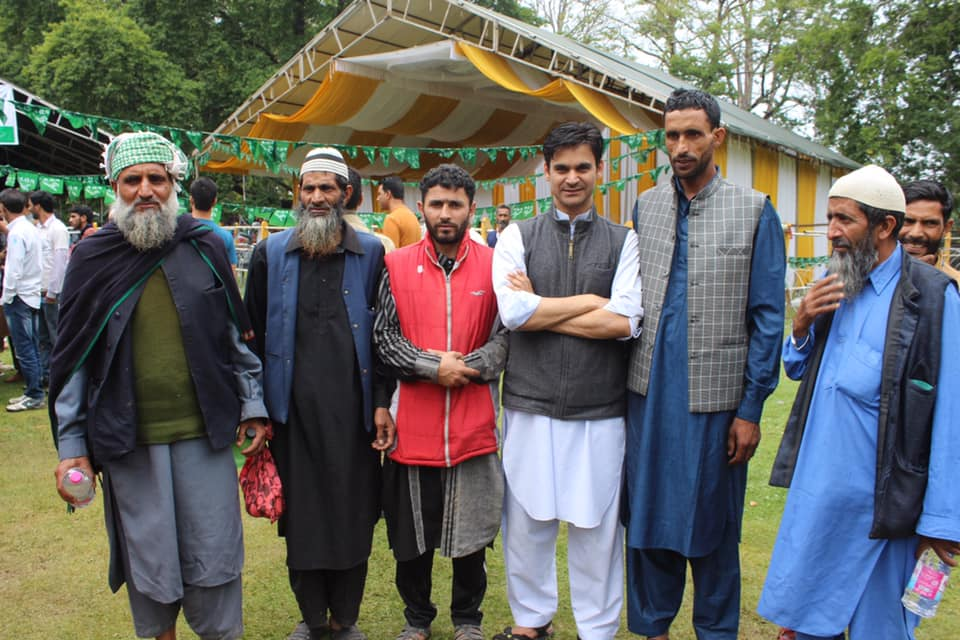
Waheed Para poses with suppoters at a rally in Srinagar (2019)

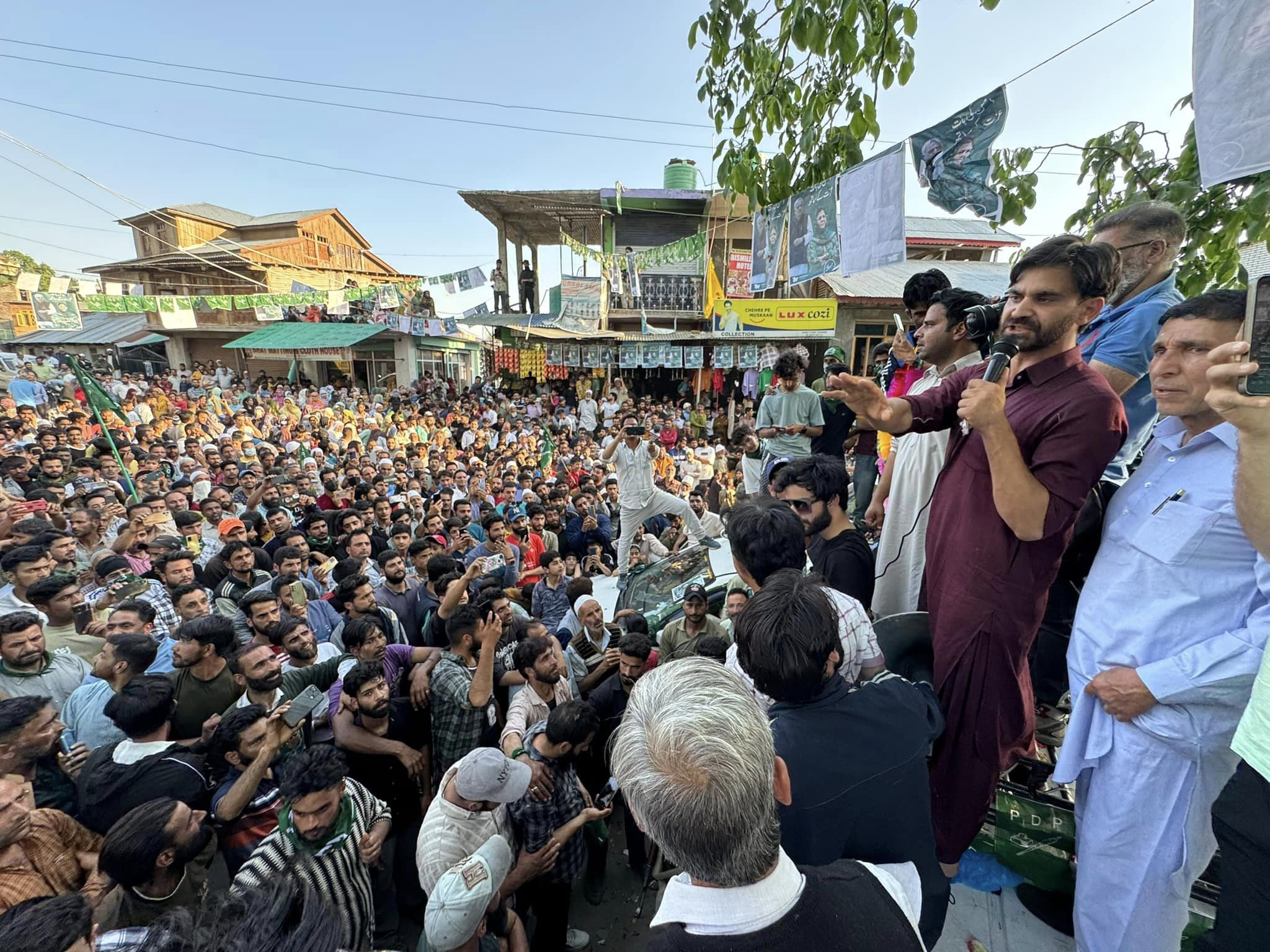
Waheed Para addressing a crowd at Anantnag (2024)

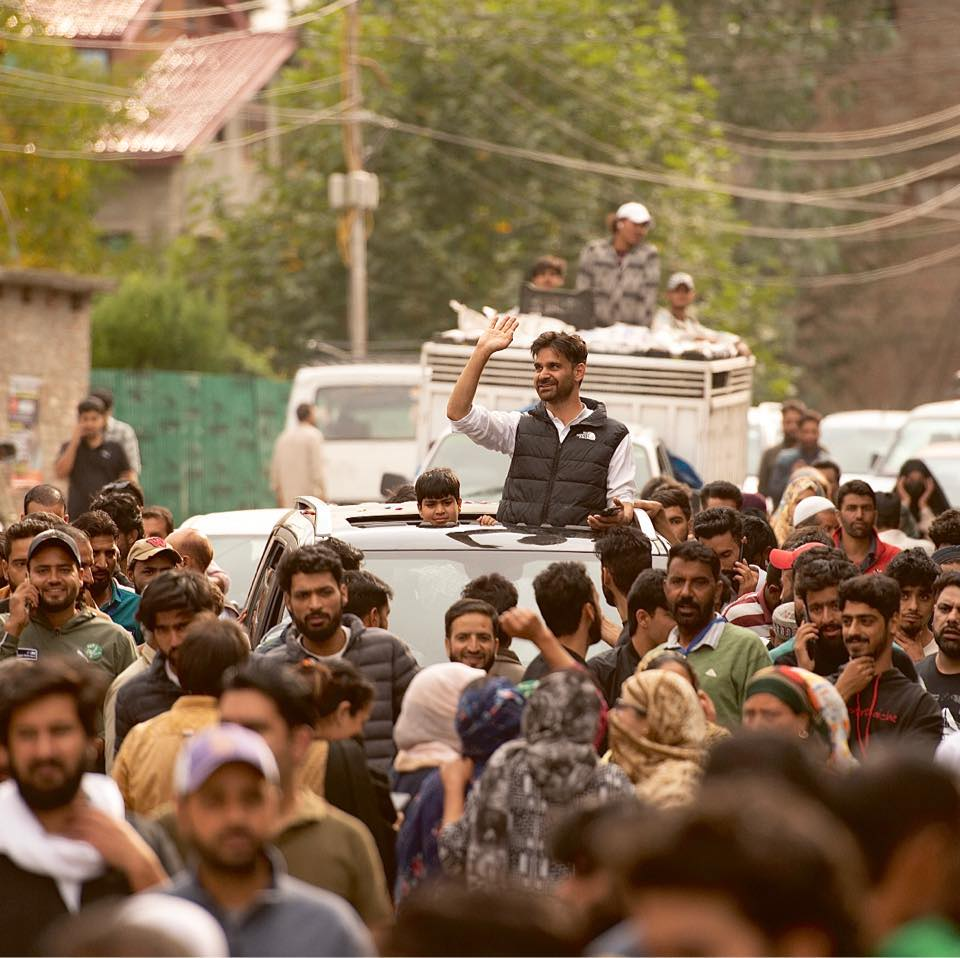
Waheed Para after winning elections from Pulwama
