= Mohammad Khalil Bandh =

Indian politician

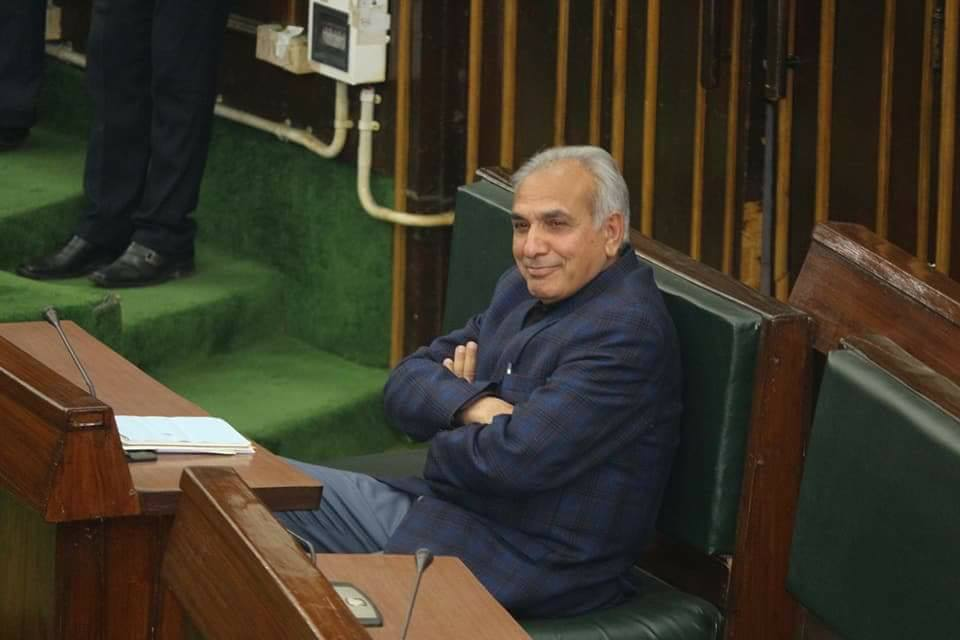

Minister Agriculture and Production
- In office 2018–2018
- Governor: Narinder Nath Vohra
- Chief Minister: Mehbooba Mufti

Member Jammu and Kashmir Legislative Assembly
- In office 2014–2018
- Governor: Narinder Nath Vohra
- Chief Minister: Mehbooba Mufti
- Constituency: Pulwama
- In office 2008–2014
- Governor: Narinder Nath Vohra
- Chief Minister: Mehbooba Mufti
- Constituency: Pulwama
- In office 2002–2008
- Governor: Srinivas Kumar Sinha
- Chief Minister: Mufti Mohammad Sayeed
- Constituency: Pulwama

Personal details
- Born: c. 1952 Banderpora, Pulwama, Jammu and Kashmir
- Party: Jammu and Kashmir Peoples Democratic Party
- Other political affiliations: Jammu and Kashmir National Conference
- Parent: Abdul Gaffar Bandh (father)

Mohammad Khalil Bandh (محمد خلیل بندھ) (born c. 1952) Banderpora, Pulwama, J&K is an Indian politician and the former member of Jammu and Kashmir Legislative Assembly. As a MLA, he represented Pulwama assembly constituency thrice in 2002, 2008 and 2014 when he was associated with Jammu and Kashmir People's Democratic Party and subsequently served district president of the party. In 2018, he was appointed as agriculture and production minister by Mehbooba Mufti until PDP-BJP alliance collapsed in 2018.

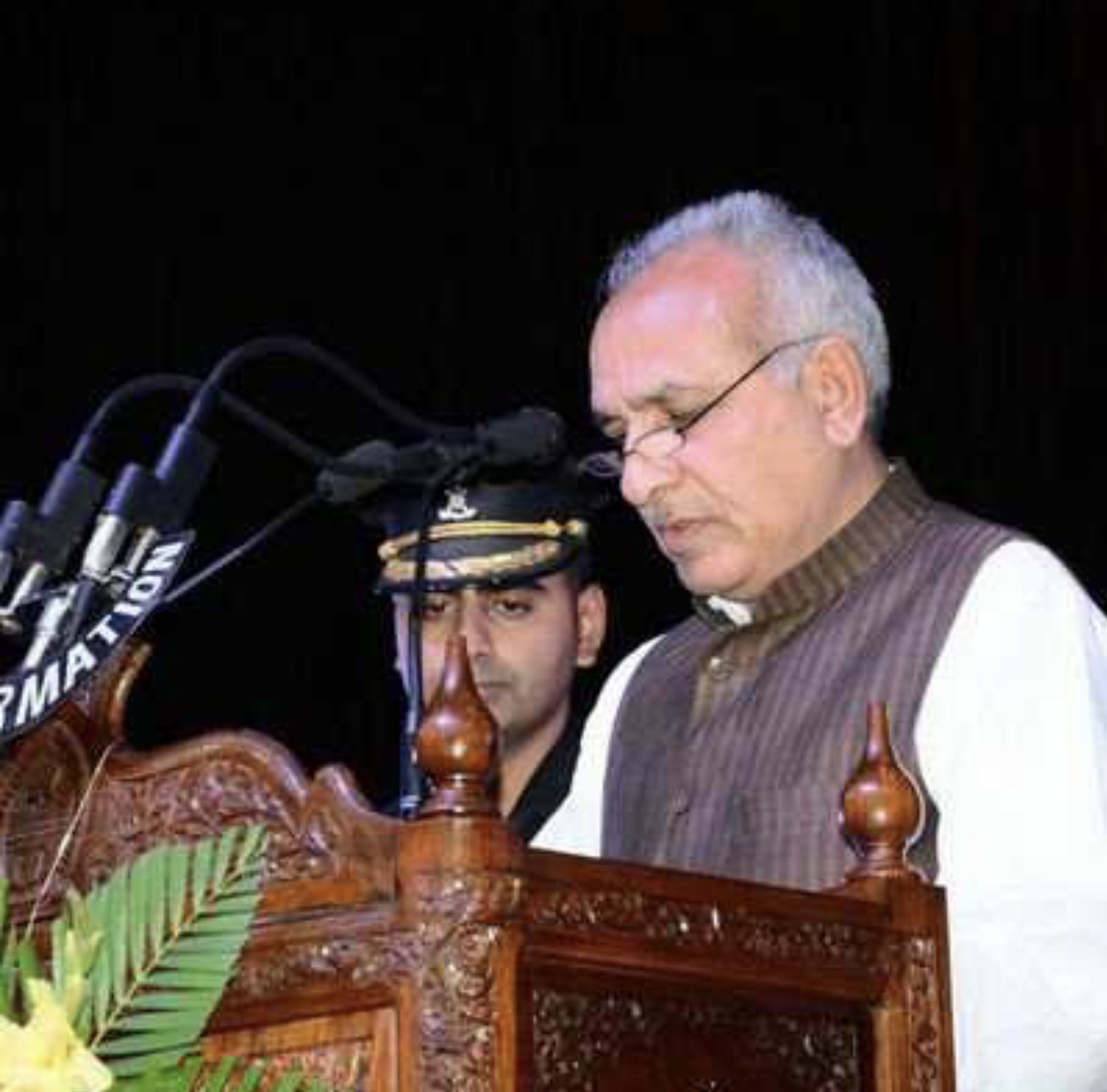
Mohammad Khalil Bandh taking oath as Cabinet Minister in the Government of Jammu and Kashmir.

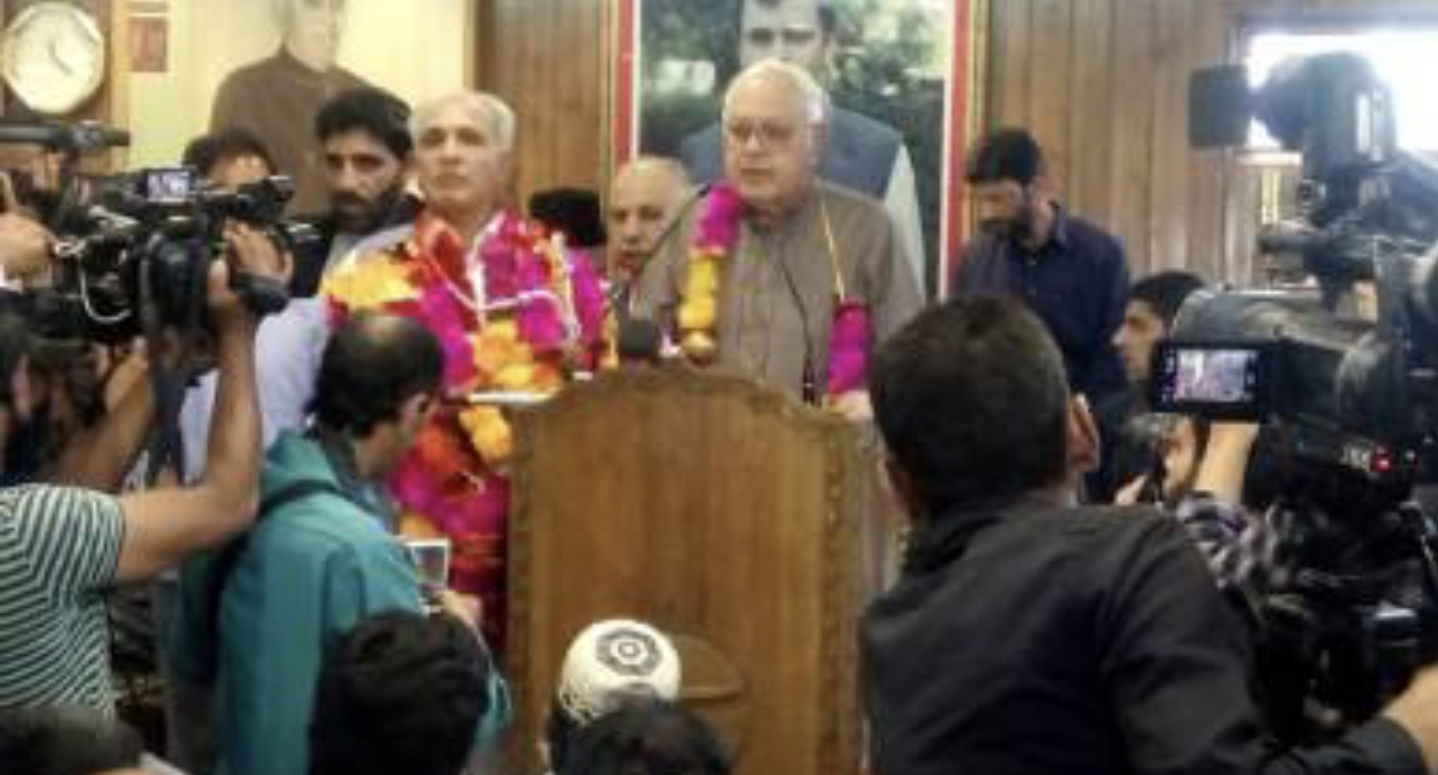
Mohammad Khalil Bandh after joining the Jammu and Kashmir National Conference in 2019.

Later in 2019, he resigned from PDP and made his political associations with the Jammu and Kashmir National Conference after he alleged party's misconduct about its old leaders.

== Clean Legal Record ==
Mohammad Khalil Bandh is recognized as one of the few politicians from Jammu and Kashmir with no criminal or corruption cases registered against him. Throughout his political career, he has maintained a clean record, as confirmed by the affidavits submitted to the Election Commission of India. These records, independently verified and published by the Association for Democratic Reforms on MyNeta.info, show that he has consistently declared zero pending criminal cases in every election he has contested. His unblemished record stands out in a region often marked by political and legal controversies, enhancing his reputation as a transparent and law-abiding public figure.

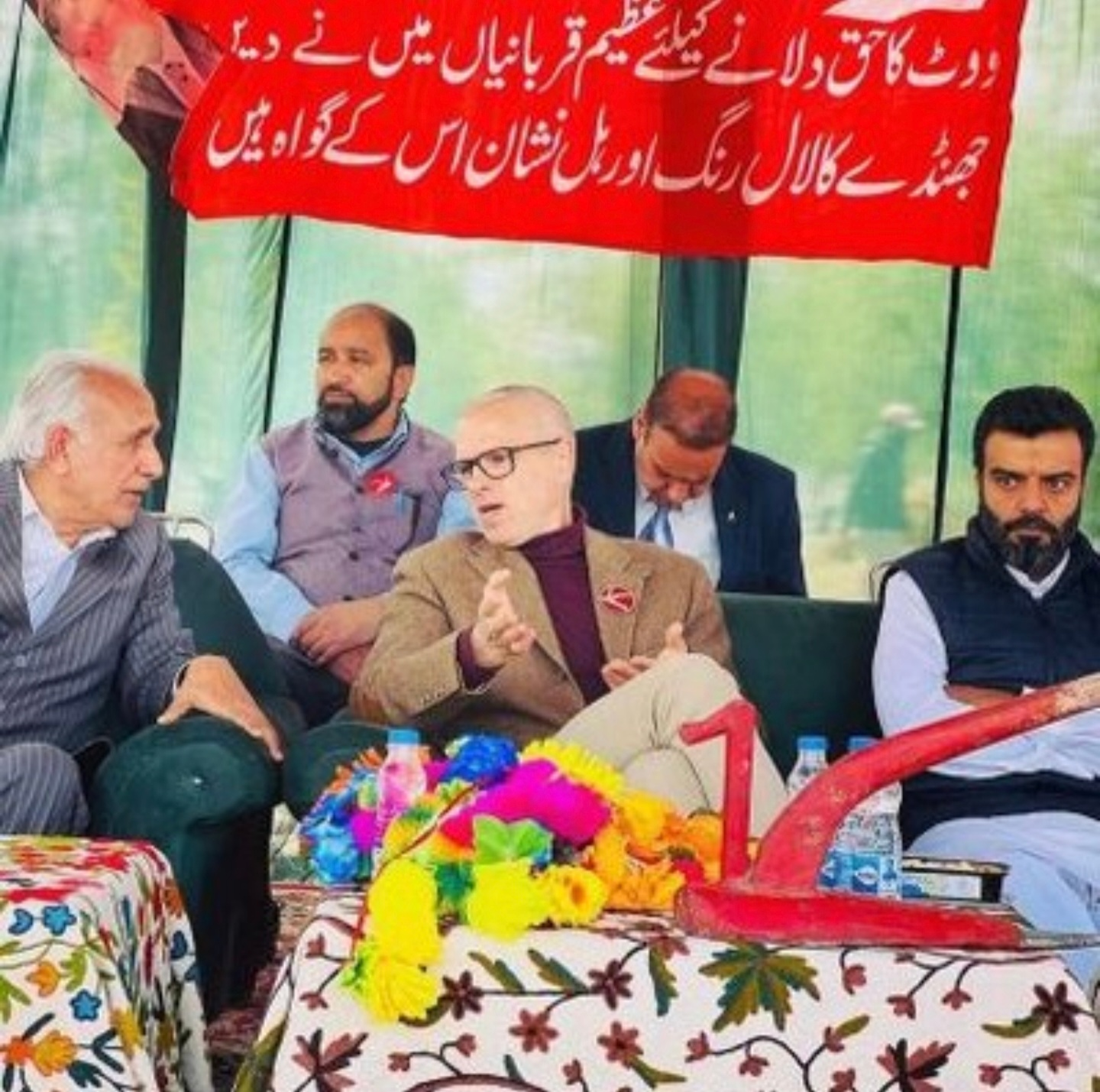
Mohammad Khalil Bandh addressing a rally in Pulwama alongside Omar Abdullah and Aga Syed Ruhullah Mehdi.

== Role in the Jammu and Kashmir National Conference ==
As of 2025, Mohammad Khalil Bandh serves as the District President of the Jammu and Kashmir National Conference (NC) for Pulwama. In this capacity, he plays a pivotal role in revitalizing the party’s grassroots network in South Kashmir. With deep roots in the region and longstanding public engagement, Bandh is regarded as a key figure in mobilizing public opinion in favor of the NC’s political stance—particularly in the party's ongoing demand for the restoration of Jammu and Kashmir's full statehood and democratic rights. His leadership reflects the party’s strategy to empower experienced local representatives to reconnect with the people amid significant political shifts in the Union Territory.

== Initiatives ==
=== Organic Model Village Initiative in Pulwama ===
As the Minister for Agriculture in Jammu and Kashmir, Mohammad Khalil Bandh played a pivotal role in promoting organic farming practices in the region. In a landmark move, he declared Bungund village in Pulwama district as Kashmir's first organic model village in June 2018. This initiative aimed to promote chemical-free vegetable farming and set a precedent for sustainable agriculture across the state.

Under Bandh's leadership, the government outlined a comprehensive support system for the village, including:

- Prohibiting the use of synthetic fertilizers and pesticides;
- Training and technical assistance from agriculture department officials;
- Distribution of 200 irrigation pump sets to support vegetable cultivation;
- Provision of brush cutters to aid in farm maintenance;
- Establishment of 20 vermi compost pits to produce organic manure locally.

Bandh emphasized the broader benefits of organic farming, citing its positive impact on environmental conservation, public health, and biodiversity. He described the initiative as a model to be replicated across Jammu and Kashmir, with the goal of revitalizing the agricultural sector for long-term sustainability and farmer prosperity.

In another related effort, Bandh highlighted plans to develop integrated farming system models to strengthen the rural economy and enhance productivity by combining crops, livestock, and allied sectors

In another related effort, Bandh highlighted plans to develop integrated farming system models to strengthen the rural economy and enhance productivity by combining crops, livestock, and allied sectors.

》As Minister for Agriculture Production, Mohammad Khalil Bandh actively advocated for the adoption of modern technologies in key productive sectors such as agriculture and sericulture, aiming to uplift the socio-economic conditions of farmers in Jammu and Kashmir. He emphasized that agriculture is central to the overall development of the state and plays a crucial role in enhancing the livelihood of the farming community. In interactions with various employee delegations, including the Agriculture Employees Association and the Centaur Lake View Hotel Employees Association, Bandh assured that their genuine concerns—ranging from pay anomalies and service conditions to training requirements—would be addressed on priority. His tenure was marked by an inclusive approach to governance and a strategic focus on agricultural development.

== Biography ==
He was born to Abdul Gaffar Bandh around 1948 in Pulwama district of Jammu and Kashmir princely state (in modern-day Jammu and Kashmir union territory). He did his matriculation in 1967 from the Jammu and Kashmir State Board of School Education.

== Detention following Abrogation of Article 370 ==
In July 2020, Mohammad Khalil Bandh was among 16 senior National Conference leaders who were placed under house detention without formal administrative orders following the abrogation of Article 370 and the reorganization of Jammu and Kashmir into union territories. After nearly 11 months of detention, party president Farooq Abdullah and vice president Omar Abdullah filed habeas corpus petitions in the Jammu and Kashmir High Court under Article 226 of the Constitution, seeking the release of the detained leaders, including Bandh. The petitions contended that the detentions were in "brazen violation" of the constitutional guarantee of personal liberty and lacked any legal justification.

== Attack on Residence in 2005 ==
On the night of June 8, 2005, the residential house of Mohammad Khalil Bandh, then serving as the People's Democratic Party (PDP) Member of the Legislative Assembly (MLA) from Pulwama, was set ablaze by suspected terrorists in Banderpora. The attack resulted in the complete destruction of the property. Fortunately, all family members and residents inside the house at the time managed to escape unharmed. The incident highlighted the volatile and dangerous environment in which public representatives operated during the peak of militancy in Jammu and Kashmir, and underscored the personal risks faced by political leaders active in the region.
