= Ghulam Mohi Uddin Mir =

Indian politician

Member of Jammu and Kashmir Legislative Assembly
- Incumbent
- Assumed office 8 October 2024
- Preceded by: Haseeb Drabu
- Constituency: Rajpora

Personal details
- Political party: Jammu & Kashmir National Conference
- Profession: Politician

Ghulam Mohi Uddin Mir from Murran Pulwama is an Indian politician from Jammu & Kashmir. He is a Member of the Jammu & Kashmir Legislative Assembly from 2024, representing Rajpora Assembly constituency as a Member of the Jammu & Kashmir National Conference party.

== Electoral performance ==
Election	Constituency	Party	Result	Votes %	Opposition Candidate	Opposition Party	Opposition vote %	Ref
2024	Rajpora	JKNC	Won	47.93%	Syed Bashir Ahmad	JKPDP	21.16%	
2014	Rajpora	JKNC	Lost	28.23%	Haseeb Drabu	JKPDP	36.95%	
2008	Rajpora	Independent	Lost	22.79%	Syed Bashir Ahmad Shah	JKPDP	25.12%	
2002	Rajpora	JKNC	Lost	24.62%	Syed Bashir Ahmad	JKPDP	58.60%	
1996	Rajpora	JKNC	Won	61.20%	Naba Mir	JD	24.09%	

== See also ==
- 2024 Jammu & Kashmir Legislative Assembly election
- Jammu and Kashmir Legislative Assembly
