= Abdul Sattar Ranjoor =

Indian politician (1917-1990)

Abdul Sattar Ranjoor (12 October 1917 – 23 March 1990) was a Kashmiri politician, and renowned revolutionary poet and writer. He was a veteran leader of the Communist Party of India (CPI). Ranjoor was the founding state secretary of the party in Jammu and Kashmir. He served as a National Council member of the party.

== Biography ==
Ranjoor was born on 12 October 1917 in Keegam Shopian. He took part in the struggle against Autocratic Dogra rule. He was active in the Ahmadi movement between 1934 and 1937. In 1939 he joined the Jammu and Kashmir National Conference. Ranjoor also played an important role in building up the peasant movement in the Kashmir Valley. He was jailed in 1942 for his role in the peasant movement. He was accused in the Pulwama Conspiracy Case, and went underground for over a year during the Quit Kashmir movement. During this time his home was frequently raided and looted by Dogra regime. Ranjoor was also a noted Urdu poet. Whilst living in Lahore for a couple of years, he had been close to the renowned poet Sir Muhammad Iqbal. who was instrumental in infusing social and political activism into Ranjoor's life and poetry.

In 1949 he left the National Conference, and founded the underground Communist Party organisation in Kashmir. He was arrested in 1951. In 1953 he became vice president of the Democratic Youth League. In 1957 he joined the Democratic National Conference. In 1962 he became the vice president of the Jammu and Kashmir Kisan Sabha.

Ranjoor contested the 1962 Jammu and Kashmir Legislative Assembly election, standing as a Democratic National Conference candidate in the Rajpora seat. According to the official report, he finished in second place but obtained merely 188 votes (0.8% of the votes in the constituency). Actually he and DNC boycotted the elections just days before voting due to unprecedented violence unleashed by Bakshi Regime. Hence this election became infamous for fraud and massive rigging by the ruling party.

In 1966 he became the president of the Jammu and Kashmir Kisan Sabha. He also became the Organising Secretary of CPI in Jammu and Kashmir in the same year. He served as the editor of Hamara Kashmir ('Our Kashmir').

He contested the Shopian seat in the 1967 Jammu and Kashmir Legislative Assembly election, standing as a CPI candidate. He finished in third place with 2,807 votes (16.93% of the votes in the constituency). He again stood as a candidate in Shopian in the 1972 election, finishing in third place again but increasing his result to 5,160 votes (25.87%).

In his later years Ranjoor withdrew from active politics due to old age. and to focus on his poetry. However, he remained socially active and his native home continued to be an open house where commoners could go to seek his help and guidance. He also continued to be member of National Council of Communist Party of India. On 23 March 1990 militants barged into his house in Keegam Shopian. Ranjoor was shot and died instantly. He was 73 years old at the time of his death. Ranjoor's all works and Autobiography is available at www.ranjoor-kashmiri.com
