= Sheikh Ahsan Ahmed =

Indian politician

Member of Jammu and Kashmir Legislative Assembly
- Incumbent
- Assumed office 8 October 2024
- Constituency: Lal Chowk

Personal details
- Political party: Jammu & Kashmir National Conference
- Profession: Politician

Sheikh Ahsan Ahmed is an Indian politician from Jammu & Kashmir. He is a Member of the Jammu & Kashmir Legislative Assembly from 2024, representing Lal Chowk Assembly constituency as a Member of the Jammu & Kashmir National Conference party. He is the son of former MLC Sheikh Ghulam Qadir Pardesi.

== Electoral performance ==
Election	Constituency	Party	Result	Votes %	Opposition Candidate	Opposition Party	Opposition vote %	Ref
2024	Lal Chowk	JKNC	Won	45.45%	Mohammad Ashraf Mir	JKAP	14.64%	

== See also ==
- 2024 Jammu & Kashmir Legislative Assembly election
- Jammu and Kashmir Legislative Assembly
