= Mubarak Gul =

Indian politician

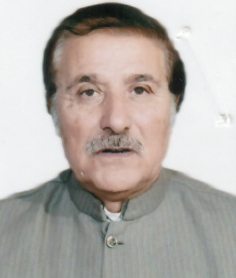

Speaker of the Jammu and Kashmir Legislative Assembly
- In office 28 February 2013 – 18 March 2015
- Governor: Narinder Nath Vohra
- Chief Minister: Omar Abdullah
- Preceded by: Akbar Lone
- Succeeded by: Kavinder Gupta

Member of Jammu and Kashmir Legislative Assembly
- In office 2014–2018
- Constituency: Eidgah
- In office 2008–2014
- Constituency: Eidgah
- In office 2002–2008
- Constituency: Eidgah
- In office 1996–2002
- Constituency: Eidgah
- In office 1983–1986
- Constituency: Eidgah
- Incumbent
- Assumed office 2024
- Constituency: Eidgah

Member of J&K Legislative Council (MLC)
- In office 1987–1993

Personal details
- Born: 1951 (age 74–75)
- Party: Jammu and Kashmir National Conference
- Education: BA
- Alma mater: University of Kashmir

Mubarak Ahmad Gul (born 1951), also known as Mubarak Gul, is an Indian politician from Jammu and Kashmir. He is a six time member of Jammu and Kashmir Legislative Assembly and seven time legislator. In 2024, he won from Eidgah Assembly constituency.

Representing Jammu & Kashmir National Conference, he also served speaker of the Jammu and Kashmir legislative assembly from 2013 to 2015 and was advisor to the then chief minister Omar Abdullah. He was also appointed Pro-tem Speaker of J&K Legislative Assembly in 2024.

== Early life and education ==
Gul is from Shah Mohallah, Nawabazar, Srinagar district, Jammu and Kashmir. He is the son of Haji Ghulam Mohammad Nihami,a freedom fighter during the Quit Kashmir Movement started by Sher-e-Kashmir Sheikh Mohammed Abdullah. He completed his B.A.in 1978 at a college affiliated with Kashmir University.

== Career ==
Gul started his political career as a councillor in 1976 and was also the president of Rural Development Society, Jammu and Kashmir Youth Federation, in addition to serving as the president of youth wing of National Conference. After electing to the assembly in 1983, the party declined to give him mandate, but was later selected to the upper house by the NC party, the ruling party of that time.

He was first elected to the Jammu and Kashmir assembly in 1983, and then in 1996, 2002, and 2008. He contested his last election in 2014 assembly polls and won from Eidgah constituency.

On 28 February 2013, Gul replaced Akbar Lone as the speaker of the Jammu and Kashmir Legislative Assembly, as Lone was taken into the cabinet by CM Omar Abdullah.

== Electoral performance ==
Election	Constituency	Party	Result	Votes %	Opposition Candidate	Opposition Party	Opposition vote %	Ref
2024	Eidgah	JKNC	Won	33.50%	Ghulam Nabi Bhat	Independent	26.19%	
2014	Eidgah	JKNC	Won	41.38%	Ali Mohammad Wani	JKPDP	37.66%	
2008	Eidgah	JKNC	Won	35.97%	Asifa Tariq Qara	JKPDP	22.42%	
2002	Eidgah	JKNC	Won	60.62%	Mohammed Ashraf Bakashi	Independent	22.35%	
1996	Eidgah	JKNC	Won	78.12%	Farooq Ahmad	JD	9.85%	
1983	Eidgah	JKNC	Won	93.87%	Ghulam Mohammed Misgar	INC	3.28%	
