= Rajpora =

Village in Pulwama, J&K, India

Coordinates: 33°49′27.35″N 74°51′11.29″E

Rajpora Rajpur
- Tehsil
- Location of Rajpora in Jammu and Kashmir
- Interactive map of Rajpora
- Country: India
- State: Jammu and Kashmir
- Division: Kashmir
- District: Pulwama
- Elevation: 1,800 m (5,900 ft)

Population
  - Total: 5,215

Languages
  - Official: Kashmiri, Hindi, Urdu, Dogri, English
- Time zone: UTC+5:30 (IST)

Rajpora, also known as Rajpur, is a Village and a Tehsil in the Pulwama district of the Kashmir Valley of Jammu and Kashmir, India. It is located 43 km (27 mi) away from Srinagar and 299 km (186 mi) away from Jammu. Rajpora is situated at 1,800 metres (5,900 ft) above the mean sea level.

== Demographics ==
As per census of 2011 population of Rajpora stands at 4200, with 2300 males and 1900 females. Population of people under the age of 6 in Rajpora is 1,169, which is 22.42% of total population of the village. Average Sex Ratio of Rajpora village is 892 and child Sex Ratio of the Rajpora as per census of 2011 is 729. In 2011, literacy rate of Rajpora was 62% in which male literacy stands at 57.67% while female literacy rate stands at 51.61%.

== Villages ==
1. Gulshanabad 2. Achagoza 3. Bamnoo 4. Pachahar 5. Drabgam 6. Rohmoo 7. Kalampora 8. Shadimarg 9. Sangarwani 10. Thokerpora 11. Mirgund 12. Khaigam 13. Rahmoo 14. Bellow 15. Abhama 16. Zagigam

== Governance ==
Under the Panchyati Raj Act, Rajpora is administered by the Sarpanch.

== Economy ==
Out of total population only 2921 people were employed as of 2011 census. Rest of the population is engaged in orchard business. This village has huge dependency on horticulture and other allied sectors like dairy and bread business, a local bread namely Shirmal is famous of this Village.

== Education ==
- Government Degree College, Rajpora
- Abu Hanifa Memorial Institute Rajpora
- Govt Model Higher Secondary Rajpora
- Govt Girls High School Rajpora
- Syed Abdullah Basri Rajpora
- Govt. Boys Middle School

== Castes ==
Schedule Tribe (ST) constitutes 0.29% of total population in Rajpora. No Scheduled Caste (SC) live in Rajpora.
