= Ghulam Nabi Lone =

Indian politician

Ghulam Nabi Lone Hanjura
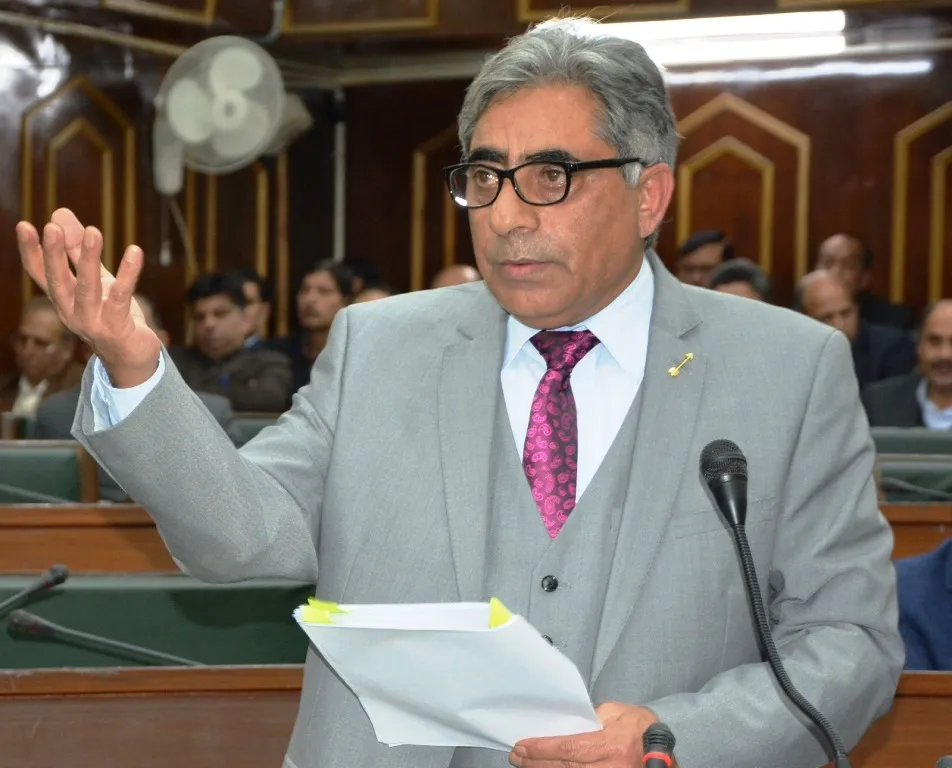
- Ghulam Nabi Lone Hanjura

General Secretary, Jammu & Kashmir People's Democratic Party
- Incumbent
- Assumed office 27 August 2018
- Leader: Mehbooba Mufti
- Constituency: Charari Sharief

Cabinet Minister for Revenue, Govt of J&K
- In office 30 April 2018 – 19 June 2018

Cabinet Minister for Agriculture, Govt of J&K
- In office 5 April 2016 – 30 April 2018

Cabinet Minister for Agriculture, Govt of J&K
- In office 1 March 2015 – 7 January 2016

Chairman Jammu and Kashmir Legislative Council
- In office July 2007 – January 2009
- Preceded by: Abdul Rashid Dar
- Succeeded by: Amrit Malhotra

Personal details
- Spouse: Married
- Education: BA LLB
- Alma mater: University of Kashmir

Ghulam Nabi Lone (Hanjura) is an Indian politician and former cabinet minister of Jammu and Kashmir, belonging to the Jammu and Kashmir Peoples Democratic Party. An Advocate by profession, Lone was part of the 12th Jammu and Kashmir Legislative Assembly from Charari Sharief constituency.

Hanjura is currently serving as JKPDP's General Secretary. He served as a Cabinet Minister in the Government of Jammu and Kashmir under Chief Minister Mufti Mohammad Sayeed and later Mehbooba Mufti with Agriculture Production and Revenue as portfolios.

== Political career ==
After contesting multiple elections, Lone was nominated as the member of Jammu and Kashmir Legislative Council, and in 2007 was nominated as the Chairman Jammu and Kashmir Legislative Council.

Lone won the 2014 Legislative Assembly elections from Chrari Shareef constituency and was inducted into the Second Mufti Mohammad Sayeed ministry and later in the Mehbooba Mufti ministry as a cabinet minister.

On 27 August 2018 Jammu and Kashmir Peoples Democratic Party's President Mehbooba Mufti appointed Lone as the General Secretary of the party.

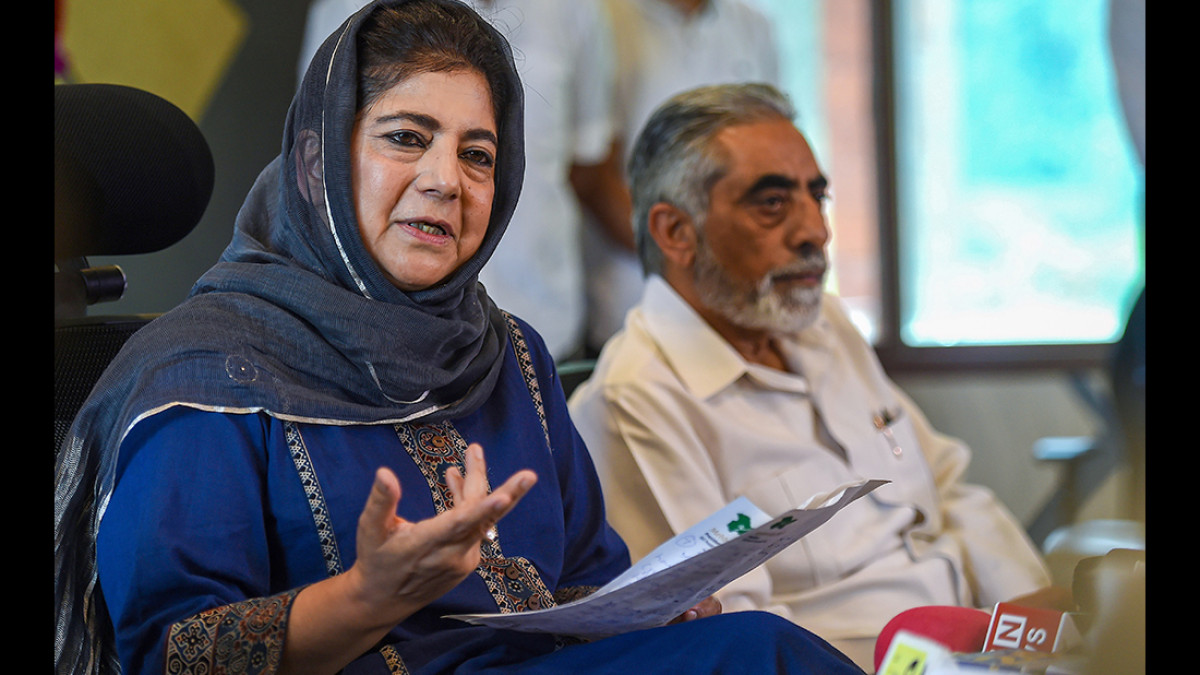
Ghulam Nabi Lone Hanjura with Mehbooba Mufti addressing a press conference in Srinagar.
