= Rivers of Jammu and Kashmir =

Jammu and Kashmir has many lakes, rivers, and glaciers. Significant rivers that flow through Jammu & Kashmir from the Himalayas are Jhelum, Chenab and Ravi These river basins are located at a higher elevation facilitating huge hydro power potential.

== List of rivers ==
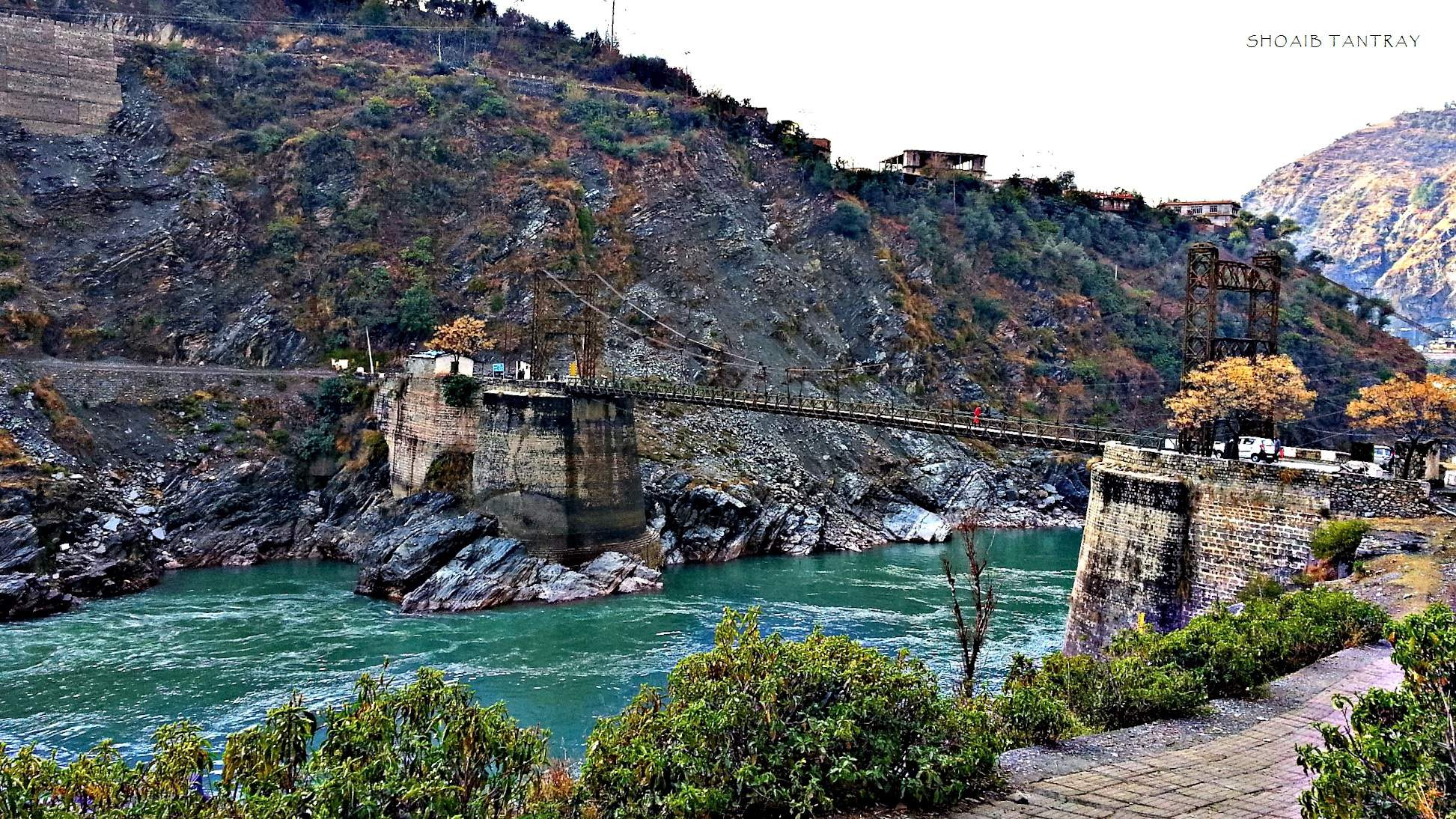
Old bridge over Chenab river at Ramban, Jammu and Kashmir

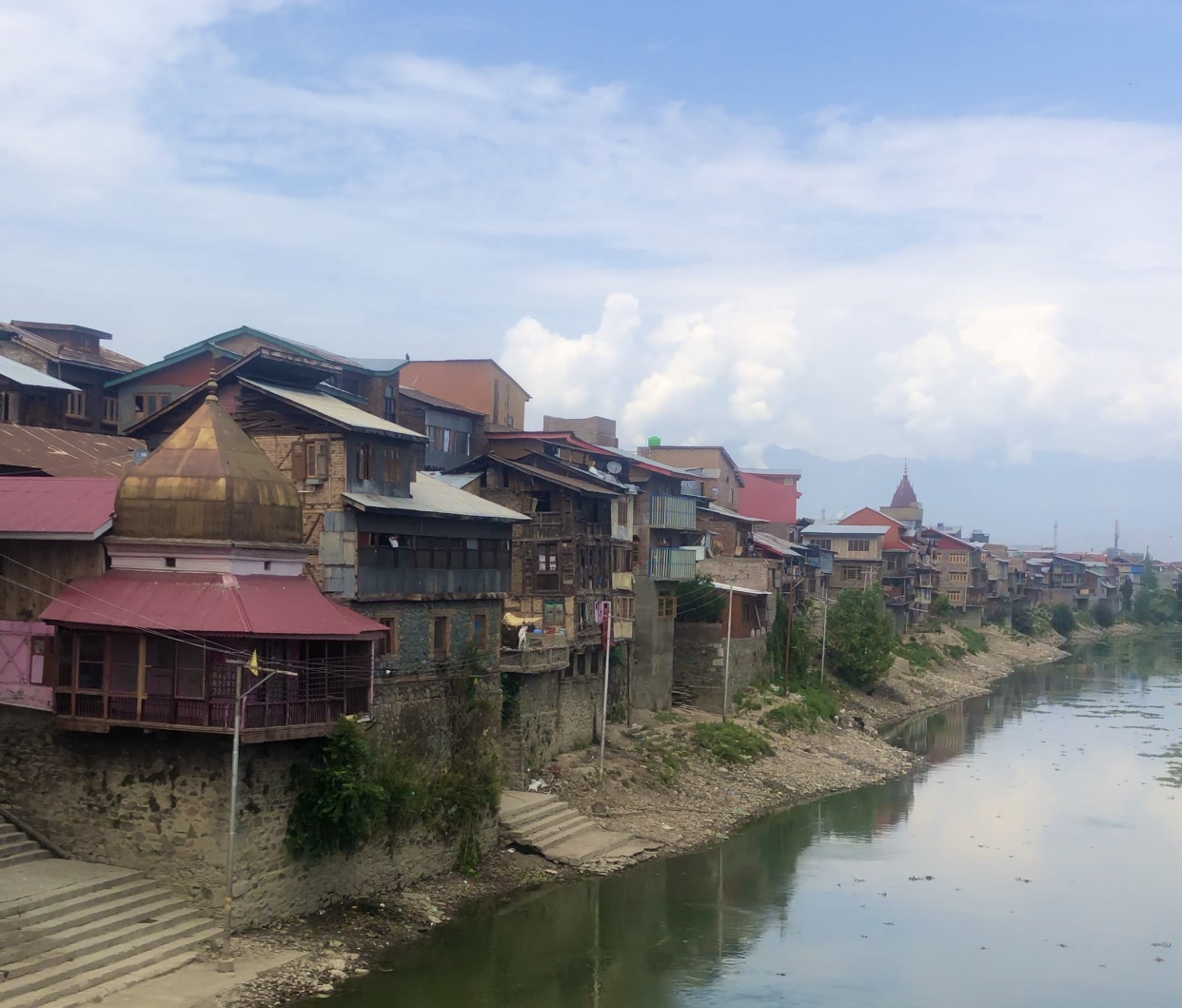
Jhelum River in Srinagar

Jammu & Kashmir rivers fall into three river systems.

=== Indus River System ===
- Indus River (Main)
  - Ladakh, in Ladakh the main tributaries of Indus are Suru, Nubra and Zanskar rivers.
    - Suru River (Indus tributary; flows through Kargil)
      - Dras River (Joins Suru near Kargil)
      - Shingo River (Tributary of Suru)
    - Nubra River (Indus tributary in Ladakh)
    - Zanskar River (Major Indus tributary; merges at Nimmu)
      - Yapola River (Tributary of Zanskar, which merges with Indus)
      - Markha River
  - Jammu and Kashmir, in J&K the main tributaries of Indus are Chenab and Jhelum.
    - Chenab River (Largest tributary of Indus in J&K)
      - Marusudar River (Largest tributary of Chenab, joins near Kishtwar)
      - Neeru River (Joins Chenab near Bhadarwah)
      - Kalnai River (Join Kalgoni River in Donadi 7km Joins Chenab in Thathri)
      - Tawi River (Politically significant; flows through Jammu city)
    - Jhelum River (Major tributary of Indus; flows through Srinagar)
      - Veshaw River (Joins Jhelum near Kulgam)
      - Sandran River (Flows through Budgam)
      - Lidder River (Major tributary; originates from Kolahoi Glacier)
      - Rambi Ara (Joins Jhelum near Sopore)
      - Poonch River
        - Nala Palkhu (Sub-tributary)
      - Kishanganga River (Becomes Neelum River in Pakistan; originates near Gurez)
    - Sind River (Joins Jhelum near Shadipora)

=== Ravi River System ===
- Ravi River (Forms boundary between J&K and Himachal Pradesh)
  - Ujh River (Politically significant; flows near Kathua)

=== Jhelum River System ===
- Jhelum River (Main), Independent drainage in Kashmir Valley
  - Brengi River (Bringhi River) (Joins Jhelum near Anantnag)
  - Dudhganga River (Rises in Pir Panjal, flows into Jhelum near Srinagar, flows from Ludurmarg and rises in the central Pir Panjal range near Tatakooti Peak. Two mountain streams, the Sangesafed Stream and Yachera Stream, form this river. This river flows through Batmalu Swamp near Srinagar.

== Lakes ==
There are around 1230 water bodies in Jammu & Kashmir, the major lakes include the following:

Listed from north to south:

- Upper North Kashmir
  - Harmukh mountain alpine area, north of Sri Nagar and south of Gurez-Markoot-Dawar-Tulail Valley
    - Madhumati Mata Lake, north of Gangabal and south of Gurez-Markoot-Dawar-Tulail Valley
    - Gangabal Lake, also called Haramukh Ganga, an alpine high-altitude oligotrophic lake
    - Nundkol Lake, immediate south of Gangabal Lake
    - KundSar Lake, west of Nundkol Lake.
    - Sheera Sar Lake, west of Nundkol Lake.
    - Sarbal Sar Lake, west of Nundkol Lake.
- North Kashmir
  - Wular Lake, northwest of Sri Nagar
  - Manasbal Lake, between Wular Lake and Sri Nagar
  - Sri Nagar
    - Khushal Sar
    - Anchar Lake, south of Khushal Sar
    - Nageen Lake (Nagin Lake), south of Khusal Sar and interconnected to Dal Lake
    - Dal Lake, east of Nageen Lake
- South Kashmir
  - ?
- Jammu Division
    - Mansar Lake,
    - Saruinsar (also spelled Surinsar) refers to Surinsar Lake, a picturesque lake located in the Samba district of Jammu division
    - Kishtwar district has a large number of glacial lakes. Reports indicate that the district has around 197 glacial lakes, the highest number in the Jammu and Kashmir Union Territory. Most of these lakes are located in high-altitude mountainous areas and have formed due to glacier melting.

== Dams and hydroelectricity ==
Dams in Jammu & Kashmir, categorised by Operational, Under Construction, and Proposed.

- Jammu Division
- Chenab River Basin
  - Baglihar Dam (Operational since 2008)
    - River: Chenab (Near Ramban)
    - Capacity: 900 MW
  - Dul Hasti Hydroelectric Plant (Operational since 2007)
    - River: Chenab (Between Kishtwar and Doda)
    - Capacity: 390 MW
  - Salal Dam (Operational since 1987)
    - River: Chenab (Near Reasi)
    - Capacity: 690 MW
  - Ratle Hydroelectric Plant (Operational since 2024)
    - River: Chenab (Near Drabshalla)
    - Capacity: 850 MW
  - Pakal Dul Dam (Under Construction, expected 2025)
    - River: Marusudar (Tributary of Chenab)
    - Capacity: 1,000 MW
  - Kwar Hydroelectric Project (Under Construction, expected 2028)
    - River: Chenab (Near Kishtwar)
    - Capacity: 540 MW
  - Kiru Hydroelectric Project (Under Construction, expected 2026)
    - River: Chenab (Between Dul Hasti and Kwar)
    - Capacity: 624 MW
- Kashmir division
- Jhelum River Basin
  - Uri Dam (Operational since 1997)
    - River: Jhelum (Near LOC, Uri)
    - Capacity: 480 MW
  - Kishanganga Hydroelectric Project (Operational since 2018)
    - River: Kishanganga/Neelum (Gurez Valley)
    - Capacity: 330 MW
  - Lower Kalnai Hydroelectric Project (Under Construction)
    - River: Kalnai (Tributary of Jhelum)
    - Capacity: 48 MW
  - Upper Sind Hydroelectric Project (Proposed)
    - River: Sind (Tributary of Jhelum)
    - Capacity: 250 MW
- Indus River Basin (Ladakh Region)
  - Nimoo Bazgo Hydroelectric Plant (Operational since 2014)
    - River: Indus (Near Alchi, Ladakh)
    - Capacity: 45 MW
  - Chutak Hydroelectric Plant (Operational since 2012)
    - River: Suru (Tributary of Indus, Kargil)
    - Capacity: 44 MW
  - Bursar Hydroelectric Project (Proposed)
    - River: Marusudar (Chenab tributary)
    - Capacity: 800 MW
- Ravi River Basin
  - No major dams in J&K; projects exist downstream in Punjab and Himachal Pradesh states in India, such as Ranjit Sagar Dam (600 MW) on Ravi on border of J&K and Himachal Pradesh.

== Issues ==
Rivers flowing through Jammu and Kashmir also contribute to the Water politics and Water conflict dimension of the larger Indo-Pakistani wars and conflicts. J&K government in India continues to reject the Indus Water Treaty (IWT) as detrimental to the interest of J&K, this treaty was suspended by India in 2025 after 2025 Pahalgam attack in Indian-held Kashmir allegedly by Pakistan-backed terrorists. Indo-Pakistani water dispute of 1948 was predecessor to the IWT. Pakistan has formed the Indus River System Authority to manage and distribute the water of IWT rivers among Pakistani provinces.

== See also ==
- Rivers of India
  - Rigvedic rivers, Northwest Greater India
  - Irrigation in India
- India–Pakistan relations
