= Marwah valley =

Village in Jammu and Kashmir

Marwah
- Valley/Sub-division
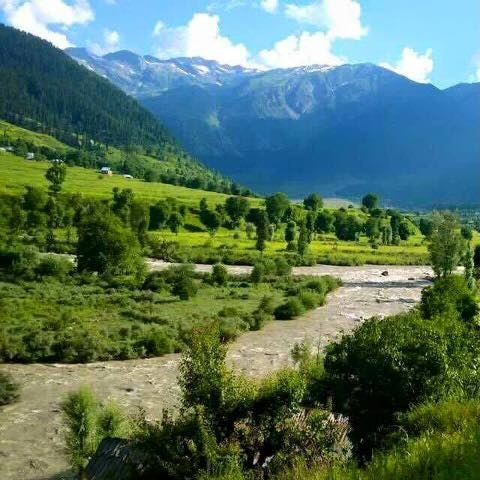
- Marwah Valley

- Location in Jammu and Kashmir, India
- Coordinates: 33.8168°N 75.9155°E
- Country: India
- Union territory: Jammu and Kashmir
- Division: Jammu
- Region: Chenab Valley
- District: Kishtwar

Area
  - Total: 307.35 km^{2} (118.67 sq mi)

Population (2011)
  - Total: 35,572
  - Density: 115.74/km^{2} (299.76/sq mi)

Language
  - Spoken: Kashmiri, Kishtwari
  - Official: Urdu
- Pin Code: 182205
- DDC: Sheikh Zafarullah

Marwah is a valley and sub-division in the Kishtwar district of Jammu and Kashmir in India. Marwah is surrounded by the Warwan valley to the northwest, Ladakh and Zanskar to the east, Chatroo and Kishtwar to the south, and Anantnag in the west. The area is drained by river Marusudar, which is the largest tributary of Chenab.

The various tourist destinations of Marwah include Tatapani, Kishtwar National Park, Sarasnag, Hajan Park, Mudaksar, Nun Kun, Kandinag, Fariabad Yordu Doomail and Cricket Stadium Yordu.

== Demographics ==
Marwah sub division consists of 4 tehsils and 27 villages, according to census 2011.

Name of Villages with Population in Marwah
S. No.	Village	Administrative Division	Population
1	Sonder	Marwah	3658
2	Lopara	Marwah	3146
3	Lohrna	Marwah	2994
4	Chanjer	Marwah	2174
5	Nopachi	Marwah	2102
6	Qaderna	Marwah	1961
7	Yeerdu	Marwah	1705
8	Rinaie	Marwah	1650
9	Janak Pur	Marwah	1578
10	Deharna	Marwah	1424
11	Chicha Dachhan	Marwah	1389
12	Pathgam	Marwah	1242
13	Margi	Marwah	1207
14	Busmina	Marwah	1041
15	Inshan	Marwah	1031
16	Aftee	Marwah	932
17	Choye Draman	Marwah	920
18	Mulwarwan	Marwah	850
19	Tiller	Marwah	762
20	Barayan	Marwah	761
21	Gumri	Marwah	578
22	Sukhnai	Marwah	508
23	Hanzal	Marwah	472
24	Mungli	Marwah	466
25	Nowgam	Marwah	415
26	Dharie	Marwah	362
27	Rekenwas	Marwah	244

== Religion ==
The region has a Muslim majority population, with a significant Hindu minority.

Religion in Marwah (2011)
1. Islam (79.1%)
2. Hinduism (20.8%)
3. Christianity (0.14%)
4. Other / Unstated (0.03%)

== Language and culture ==
The vast majority of the population speaks Kashmiri.

Languages of Marwah (2011)
1. Kashmiri (98.6%)
2. Gojri (0.57%)
3. Dogri (0.33%)
4. Ladakhi (0.30%)
5. Other (0.16%)

Culture is similar to that of Kashmir valley.
