= Ababeel (NGO) =

Nonprofit medical, rescue, emergency, charitable trust and charitable organization

- Formation: July 21, 2015; 11 years ago
- Founder: Adv. Hassan Babur Nehru
- Type: Charity
- Legal status: Registered
- Purpose: Humanitarian aid, Rescue, Blood donation
- Headquarters: Doda; Jammu and Kashmir, India
- Region served: Jammu and Kashmir
- Head of Main Branch: Muzammil Wahidi
- Main organ: Doda

Ababeel (ابابیل), also known as Ababeel NGO, is a charitable trust that provides emergency assistance, disaster relief, food kits, and blood donations for the needy, poor, orphans, widows, and also in emergencies in the Chenab Valley's Doda, Kishtwar, Thathri, Bhaderwah, Bhalessa, Chatroo, Dhadpeth and Jammu. The organization assists people irrespective of caste and religion. It is registered with the Sub Registrar Court Doda.

Ababeel was founded in July 2015 by Hassan Babur Nehru and registered in the Sub Registrar Office Doda by Syed Imtiaz Hussain, Muzammil Wahidi and Mudassir Hassan.

== History ==
Ababeel was started in Doda. After a gap of some months, the Kishtwar unit of Ababeel was created. Later, several more units were created under the same registration in the Thathri, Bhaderwah, and Gandoh areas of the Chenab Valley, as well as in the Jammu district of the Jammu and Kashmir union territory.

It was founded in 2015 after the 2014 Kashmir Floods destroyed many lives in the Kashmir valley. The founder of Ababeel collected relief material in Doda for flood-affected Kashmiris and went voluntarily with some associates to Kashmir to distribute them. However, when they reached Kashmir, some associates suggested writing any name on the packs of relief material so that people would remember that the Doda area had helped them.

One of the associates suggested "Ababeel," which means "a group that is united and scattered." The logo of Ababeel Charitable Trust consists of a Swallow bird and its Arabic name "Ababeel" in alphabets. The dictionary meaning of ABABEEL is a group that is united and scattered. The bird Ababeel (Arabic: أبابيل, romanized: abābīl) refers to the miraculous birds in Islamic belief mentioned in Surah 105 of the Quran. These birds protected the Ka'ba in Mecca from the Aksumite elephant army of Abraha, then self-styled governor of Himyar, by dropping small clay stones on them as they approached. Hence, the name Ababeel was selected for writing on the relief material. Later, Adv. Hassan Babur Nehru, Dr. Muzammil Wahidi, and their associates registered the name Ababeel as a Charitable Trust in the Sub Registrar Office in Doda.

== Mission ==
The individuals who collaborate with this charitable organization do so voluntarily. The volunteers engage in humanitarian efforts inspired by the Islamic teachings of Muhammad, the last prophet in Islam, regarding social work. There are over 500 volunteers in this organization. These volunteers assist the local administration and community during emergencies, including road accidents, earthquakes, landslides, and the rescue of individuals who have drowned in the Chenab River.

== Rescue Operations ==
Ababeel, a well-known humanitarian organization, has conducted many successful rescue operations. A tragic road accident in Kishtwar resulted in 36 deaths and dozens of injuries. Ababeel was one of the first organizations to start rescue operations there, saving many lives.

On 4 February 2020, Ababeel volunteers initiated a rescue operation in Doda, where they brought the bodies of two people who had died in a road accident.

On 27 July 2021, a cloudburst hit the Hunzar hamlet of Dachhan area in the Kishtwar district. As of 29 July 2021, reports stated that 7 bodies had been recovered, 19 persons were still missing, and 5 critically injured individuals were airlifted to the district hospital in Kishtwar. Ababeel's team, along with SDRF, Police, and the Army, were involved in the rescue operation in the area.

== Humanitarian aid ==
Ababeel is also known for assisting the needy, widows, and orphans. The organization provides monthly food kits to the destitute, needy, orphans, and widows.

During the month of Ramadan, Ababeel adds Khajur to their kits for Muslim families. They also distribute the Eid Kits.

In emergencies, Ababeel reaches far-flung areas of the Chenab Valley, a hilly area, to distribute food kits. On 16 April 2020, they visited a Hindu-dominated area, Padder, to help 60 needy Hindu families. They were detained by Padder Police for donating relief material to needy families amid the Coronavirus Lockdown.

=== Mulwarwan Village Fire Incident ===
In October 2024, Ababeel NGO played a pivotal role in providing relief to the victims of a devastating fire in Mulwarwan village, located in the Warwan region of Kishtwar district, Jammu and Kashmir. The fire, which occurred on the 13th of October, destroyed approximately 60 homes and a Jama Masjid, displacing numerous families just as winter approached.

Responding swiftly, Ababeel launched a fundraising campaign across its various regional units. In just four days, the organization raised over ₹1.17 crore to support the affected families. Significant contributions were made by local residents, businesses, and community stakeholders. The Doda unit raised ₹64.65 lakh, Kishtwar collected ₹31.06 lakh, and other units from areas like Thathri, Bhalessa, Chatroo, and Jammu also contributed. These funds were earmarked for immediate relief, including the distribution of essential items such as blankets, clothing, and food supplies, as well as for long-term reconstruction efforts.

== Sehri Program ==
The Sehri program for the patients and their attendants in the hospitals is a part of Ababeel. Various units of Ababeel have been serving Sehri in hospitals since 2016.

== Controversies ==
On 16 April 2020, Ababeel NGO volunteers visited a Hindu-dominated area, Paddar in Kishtwar district, to help 60 needy Hindu families. They were detained by Padder Police for donating relief material to needy families amid the Coronavirus Lockdown.

On 10 November 2024, a volunteer of Ababeel NGO, Rehmatullah Padder, known for raising civic issues, was booked under the Public Safety Act (PSA) in Doda district, Jammu and Kashmir, on allegations of being an Over Ground Worker (OGW) for militants. Padder was arrested from his home in the Akramabad area and subsequently detained at Kot Bhalwal jail near Jammu. His colleagues and family, however, claimed that he was falsely implicated for his active involvement in raising public issues, sparking concerns about the targeting of civil society members in the region.
