= Bimal Nag =

Hill Station in Jammu and Kashmir

- Hill Station
- Bimal Nag in Saroor, Kishtwar, Jammu and Kashmir, India
- Coordinates: 33.188615°N 75.889679°E
- Country: India
- State: Jammu and Kashmir
- District: Kishtwar
- Tehsil: Drabshalla

Languages
  - Official: local language and English

Languages
  - Spoken: Kashmiri, Kishtwari, Gojri

Bimal Nag is an Ancient temple situated on a large meadow in the Saroor region of Drabshalla tehsil in Kishtwar district in the Indian union territory of Jammu and Kashmir. The area is covered in pine (Pinus roxburghii). Water has collected from a nearby natural spring to form a small pond in front of the Bimal Nag Temple, an ancient Hindu temple on the west side of the meadows called Bimal Nag. In 2013, roads were constructed in the area in an effort to increase connectivity in the rural areas of India by the Ministry of Road Transport and Highways.

== Tourism ==
Bimal Nag attracts tourists with its natural vistas and Hindu temples. As of 2020, there is no infrastructure for tourism, such as hotels, guesthouses, and restaurants, but there is a village on the northern border of the meadows. The other side of the meadows are covered with forests. Like other areas of the Kishtwar district, Bimal Nag has potential for pilgrimage due to its annual yatra. Visitors also come to enjoy Bimalnag Premier League, a cricket tournament, every year.
