= Dool, Kishtwar =

Dool
- Village
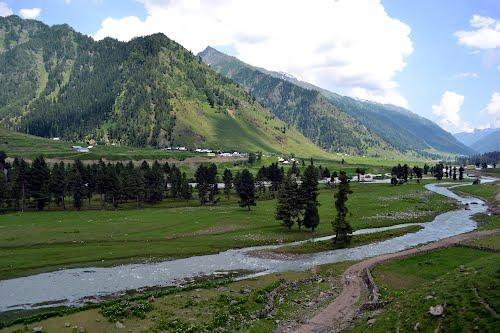
- Nearby village Warwan

- Location in Jammu and Kashmir, India
- Coordinates: 33.3631138°N 75.7690999°E
- Country: India
- Union Territory: Jammu and Kashmir
- District: Kishtwar

Area
  - Total: 26 km^{2} (10 sq mi)

Population (2011)
  - Total: 4,931
  - Density: 190/km^{2} (490/sq mi)

Languages
  - Official: Urdu, English, Hindi
  - Spoken: Kashmiri, Kishtwari
- Time zone: UTC+5:30 (IST)
- PIN: 182204
- Literacy: 62.69%
- Distance from Kishtwar town: 13.4 kilometres (8.3 mi)
- Distance from Jammu: 224.8 kilometres (139.7 mi)

Dool is one of the largest villages, located in Kishtwar district of Jammu and Kashmir, India. The village is divided into two wards namely Dool A and Dool B with total 874 householders living. Its district headquarters are pinpointed in Kishtwar and sub-district administrative units are located in "Kishtwar tehsil" which is situated on the banks of Chenab River. The distance between Dool village and Kishtwar town is 13.4 kilometres (8.3 mi).

== Demographics ==
According to the 2011 census of India, Dool has 874 households. The literacy rate of Dool village was 62.69% compared to 67.16% of Jammu and Kashmir. In Dool, Male literacy stands at 77.15% while the female literacy rate was 42.75%.

Demographics (2011 Census)
	Total	Male	Female
Population	4931	2807	2124
Children aged below 6 years	763	391	372
Scheduled caste	311	165	146
Scheduled tribe	418	213	205
Literacy	62.69%	77.15%	42.75%
Workers (all)	1699	1604	95
Main workers (total)	960	–	–
Marginal workers (total)	739	677	62
