= Bhandarkoot =

Village in Jammu and Kashmir

- Village
- Location in Jammu and Kashmir, India
- Coordinates: 33.359388°N 75.735580°E
- Country: India
- Union territory: Jammu and Kashmir
- Division: Jammu
- Region: Chenab Valley
- District: Kishtwar

Population (2009)
  - Total: 852

Language
  - Spoken: Kashmiri, Kishtwari
  - Official: Urdu
- Pin Code: 182204

Bhandarkoot (also spelt as Bandarkoot) is a village in the Kishtwar district of Jammu and Kashmir in India. The village is 12 kilometres (7.5 mi) from Kishtwar on Kishtwar-Sinthan-Anantnag road. Bhandarkoot is known for Bhandarkoot Ziyarat, a shrine of Hazrat Sheikh Zain-ud-din Rishi. At Bhandarkoot the Chenab river is joined by its tributary the Marusudar River.

== Marusudar River ==
Marusudar River is the river tributary of the Chenab River, beginning at the Nunkun glacier of the Warwan Valley and later joins the river Chenab at Bhandarkoot. It is 133 kilometres (83 mi) long and the largest river tributary to the Chenab river.

== Bhandarkoot Astaan ==
At Bhandarkoot, a holy shrine or Astaan of the saint "Shah Zain-ud-Din" is located on the left bank of the Chenab river. At this astaan cocks and sheep are sacrificed to seek the saint's blessings by the Hindu as well as Muslim communities.
