= Sekwaran =

- Village
- Location in Jammu and Kashmir, India Sekwaran (India)
- Coordinates: 33.15°N 75.58°E
- Country: India
- Union Territory: Jammu and Kashmir
- District: Kishtwar

Languages
  - Spoken: Hindi, Kishtwari, Urdu
- Time zone: UTC+5:30 (IST)

Sekwaran is a village in Kishtwar district of the Indian union territory of Jammu and Kashmir.
