= Ababil =

Ababil or Ababeel may refer to:

- Ababil (mythology), a swarm of tiny birds that, according to Islamic teachings, protected Mecca from the Aksumite army of Abraha
- Ababeel (NGO), a charitable organization based in Jammu and Kashmir
- Ababeel (missile), a Pakistani MIRV-capable medium-range ballistic missile
- Ababil-100, an Iraqi single-stage short-range ballistic missile
- Ababeel1, the first Palestinian reconnaissance unmanned combat aerial vehicle
- HESA Ababil, an Iranian unmanned aerial vehicle
- Ababil (Iranian missile)
