= Sazar =

- Village
- Location in Jammu and Kashmir, India Sazar (India)
- Coordinates: 33.34°N 76.02°E
- Country: India
- Union Territory: Jammu and Kashmir
- District: Kishtwar
- Tehsil: Paddar

Languages
  - Spoken: Hindi, Kishtwari, Urdu
- Time zone: UTC+5:30 (IST)
- PIN: 182204

Sazar is a village in Paddar tehsil of Kishtwar district in the union territory of Jammu and Kashmir, India.

== Demographics ==
According to the 2011 census of India, Sazar has 102 households. The literacy rate of Sazar village was 45.45% compared to 67.16% of Jammu and Kashmir. In Sazar, Male literacy stands at 60.89% while the female literacy rate was 26.37%.

Demographics (2011 Census)
	Total	Male	Female
Population	478	265	213
Children aged below 6 years	71	40	31
Scheduled caste	68	38	30
Scheduled tribe	0	0	0
Literacy	45.45%	60.89%	26.37%
Workers (all)	122	122	0
Main workers (total)	121	–	–
Marginal workers (total)	1	1	0
