= Kalgoni River =

Tributary of river Chenab in Jammu and Kashmir

- Location within Jammu and Kashmir Location within India

Location
- Country: India
- Flows through: Bhalessa-Donadi in Jammu and Kashmir

Physical characteristics
- Source: Glacier
  - location: Kahal Jugassar
  - coordinates: 32.931590°N 75.960022°E
- Mouth: Kalnai River
  - location: Donadi
  - coordinates: 33.133590°N 75.851829°E

The Kalgoni River is a stream located in the Bhalessa region of the Doda district in Jammu and Kashmir. It is a significant tributary of the Kalnai River, which is itself a major tributary of the Chenab River, that flows through India and Pakistan, and is among the 5 major rivers of the Punjab region.

== Geography ==
The Kalgoni River originates from the mountain ranges of Chamba, near the Sach Peak. It is one of the principal water bodies in the Bhalessa region, comprising the twin valleys of Bonjwah and Bhalessa

== Confluence ==
The Kalgoni River meets with another rivulet called Jai Nallah which flows from Jai Valley. Subsequently, the Kalgoni River combines with the Kalnai River at Donadi, becoming part of the extensive river network of the Chenab River.

== See also ==
- Kandi Canal
