= Drabshalla =

- Village
- Location in Jammu and Kashmir, India Drabshalla (India)
- Coordinates: 33.18°N 75.80°E
- Country: India
- Union Territory: Jammu and Kashmir
- District: Kishtwar

Languages
  - Spoken: Hindi, Kishtwari, Kashmiri, Urdu
- Time zone: UTC+5:30 (IST)
- PIN: 182204

Drabshalla is a village and municipality in Kishtwar district of the Indian union territory of Jammu and Kashmir. The town is located 22 kilometres from the district headquarters Kishtwar.

== Transport ==
=== Road ===
Drabshalla is well-connected by road to other places in Jammu and Kashmir and the rest of the country by the NH 244.

=== Rail ===
The nearest railway station to Drabshalla is Udhampur railway station located at a distance of 125 kilometres.

=== Air ===
The nearest airport is Jammu Airport located at a distance of 196 kilometres.

== See also ==
- Jammu and Kashmir
- Kishtwar district
- Kishtwar
- Kishtwar National Park
- Warwan Valley
