= Kwar Hydroelectric Project =

- Location within Jammu and Kashmir Location within India
- Official name: Kwar HE Project
- Country: India
- Location: Kishtwar, Jammu and Kashmir
- Coordinates: 33.354609°N 75.884012°E
- Purpose: Power
- Status: Under Construction
- Construction began: 2022
- Construction cost: ₹4526.12 Cr (September 2020 Price Level)
- Owner: Chenab Valley Power Projects Limited

Dam and spillways
- Type of dam: Gravity
- Impounds: Chenab River
- Height: 109 m (358 ft)

Kwar Hydroelectric Project
- Coordinates: 33.354609°N 75.884012°E
- Turbines: 4 x 135 MW
- Installed capacity: 540 MW

Kwar HE Project, is an under construction Hydroelectric power plant with 540 MW capacity in Kishtwar District of Jammu and Kashmir. The plant is expected to generate 1975 million units of electricity once operational. During a review meeting in January 2026, headed by Union Power Minister Manohar Lal Khattar at Kishtwar, it was stated that the project is expected to be completed by March 2028. In January 2024, the flow of Chenab river was diverted to felicitate the main dam construction. The construction of this power project was fast tracked by India after Indus Waters Treaty was put in abeyance in the aftermath of 2025 Pahalgam attack. In November 2025, a major fire incident happened inside one of the tunnels of the project when a load carrier caught fire. 39-50 workers were rescued.

== See also ==
- Chenab river dams and hydroelectric projects
- Ratle Hydroelectric Plant – under construction downstream
- Kiru Hydroelectric Project - under construction upstream
- Baglihar Dam - operational downstream
