= Dhadpeth =

Village in Jammu an Kashmir, India

Dhadpeth ڈھدپیتھ
- Village
- Country: India
- Union Territory: Jammu and Kashmir
- Division: Jammu
- Region: Chenab Valley
- District: Kishtwar

Government
  - Type: Panchayat
  - Body: Panchayat of Dadpeth

Area
  - Total: 3.50 km^{2} (1.35 sq mi)

Population (2011)
  - Total: 1,300
  - Density: 370/km^{2} (960/sq mi)

Dhadpeth (also Dadpeth) is a village in the Mughal Maidan tehsil of Kishtwar district, in the Indian union territory of Jammu and Kashmir.

== Geography ==
Dadpeth lies at an elevation of 1638 meters above sea level and is surrounded by hills, contributing to its hilly topography. The region has a temperate climate with cold winters, and its main source of water for irrigation comes from natural springs and rainwater. The village's coordinates are 33.22356°N latitude and 75.56432°E longitude.

== Demographics ==
The village has a population of approximately 1300 people, with 800 males and 500 females. The literacy rate is noted at 345 individuals.

== Economy ==
Agriculture is the primary economic activity in Dadpeth. Major crops include maize, wheat, kidney beans, and specialty crops such as walnuts and rajma (kidney beans).

== Infrastructure ==
Dadpeth has road connectivity, though it is 20 km from the nearest district headquarters in Kishtwar. The village has access to schools and anganwadi centers, though it lacks health and veterinary facilities. The nearest police station is located within the village.

== Panchayat and Administration ==
The village falls under the Dadpeth Panchayat, part of the Rural Development Department and Panchayat Raj.
