= Kishtwaris =

Ethnolinguistic group

Kishtwari people
Kishtwari

Total population
- 230,696

Regions with significant populations
- India (Jammu & Kashmir)

Languages
- Kishtwari

Religion
- Hinduism, Islam, Sikhism, Christianity, Buddhism

Related ethnic groups
- Kashmiri people, Western Paharis

Kishtwaris are an ethnolinguistic group inhabiting Kishtwar district, in the Chenab Valley of the eastern Jammu division of Jammu and Kashmir, India.

== Language ==
The Kishtwari language is their primary language. It is a Northern Indo-Aryan language classified as either a dialect of Kashmiri or an intermediate language between Kashmiri and other Western Pahari languages. Kishtwari shares similarities with Kashmiri due to a common origin but has also been influenced by neighboring Pahari languages, resulting in a distinct character. Kishtwari is also considered a tonal language.

== Religion ==
The Kishtwaris are a religiously diverse community. According to the 2011 census, Islam is the dominant religion, followed by Hinduism. Smaller populations adhere to Sikhism, Christianity, and Buddhism.

== History ==
The Kishtwar region has a rich history of cultural exchange. Traditionally, the area was primarily inhabited by ancestors of the Kishtwaris. Over time, particularly in the 17th and 18th centuries, people from Kashmir and other adjoining areas migrated to Kishtwar, adding to the cultural richness of the region. Today, the Kishtwaris represent a blend of ethnicities.
