= Pakal Dul Dam =

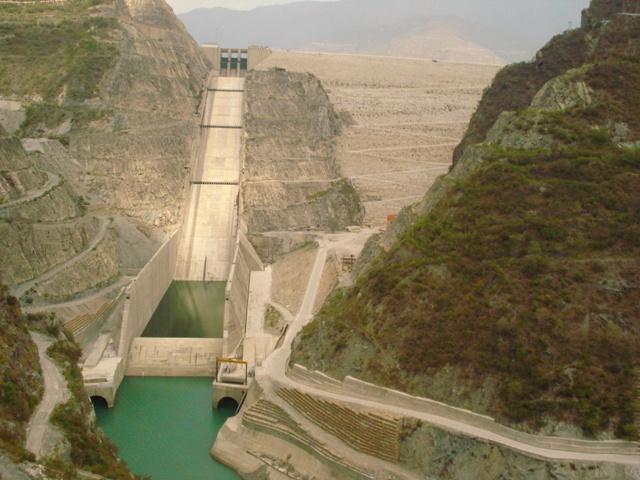

- Location within Jammu and Kashmir Location within India
- Country: India
- Location: Kishtwar district, Jammu and Kashmir
- Coordinates: 33°27′25.77″N 75°48′48.99″E
- Purpose: Power
- Status: Under construction
- Construction began: 2018
- Opening date: September 2026 (est)

Dam and spillways
- Type of dam: Embankment, concrete-face rock-fill
- Impounds: Marusudar River
- Height: 167 m (548 ft)

Reservoir
- Total capacity: 108,000,000 m^{3} (88,000 acre⋅ft)

Pakal Dul Hydroelectric Power Station
- Coordinates: 33°21′58.37″N 75°48′18.74″E
- Type: Conventional, diversion
- Turbines: 4 x 250 MW Francis-type
- Installed capacity: 1,000 MW

The Pakal Dul Dam is an under construction concrete-face rock-fill dam on the Marusudar river, a tributary of the Chenab River, in Kishtwar district of the Indian Jammu and Kashmir. The primary purpose of the dam is hydroelectric power generation. It will divert water to the south through a 10 km (6.2 mi) long headrace tunnel and into power station on the reservoir of the Dul Hasti Dam, on the Chenab. In February 2014, the project was awarded to a consortium of domestic and foreign countries. It includes Afcons Infrastructure, Jaiprakash Associates and Bharat Heavy Electricals. Pakistan, which relies on the Chenab downstream, views the dam as a violation of the Indus Water Treaty, whereas India states it is as per treaty provisions. Indian Commentator Harshil Mehta wrote that the project holds strategic interest for India, apart from utilising just Hydropower, along with Kiru and Ratle, and Ujh multipurpose project.

== Current status ==
- 2025 May: 1000 MW under-construction project 66% complete in May 2025 with expected completion date of Sept 2026.

== See also ==
- Baglihar Dam – located downstream
- Chenab river dams and hydroelectric projects
