= Sunil Kumar Sharma (Jammu and Kashmir politician) =

Indian politician

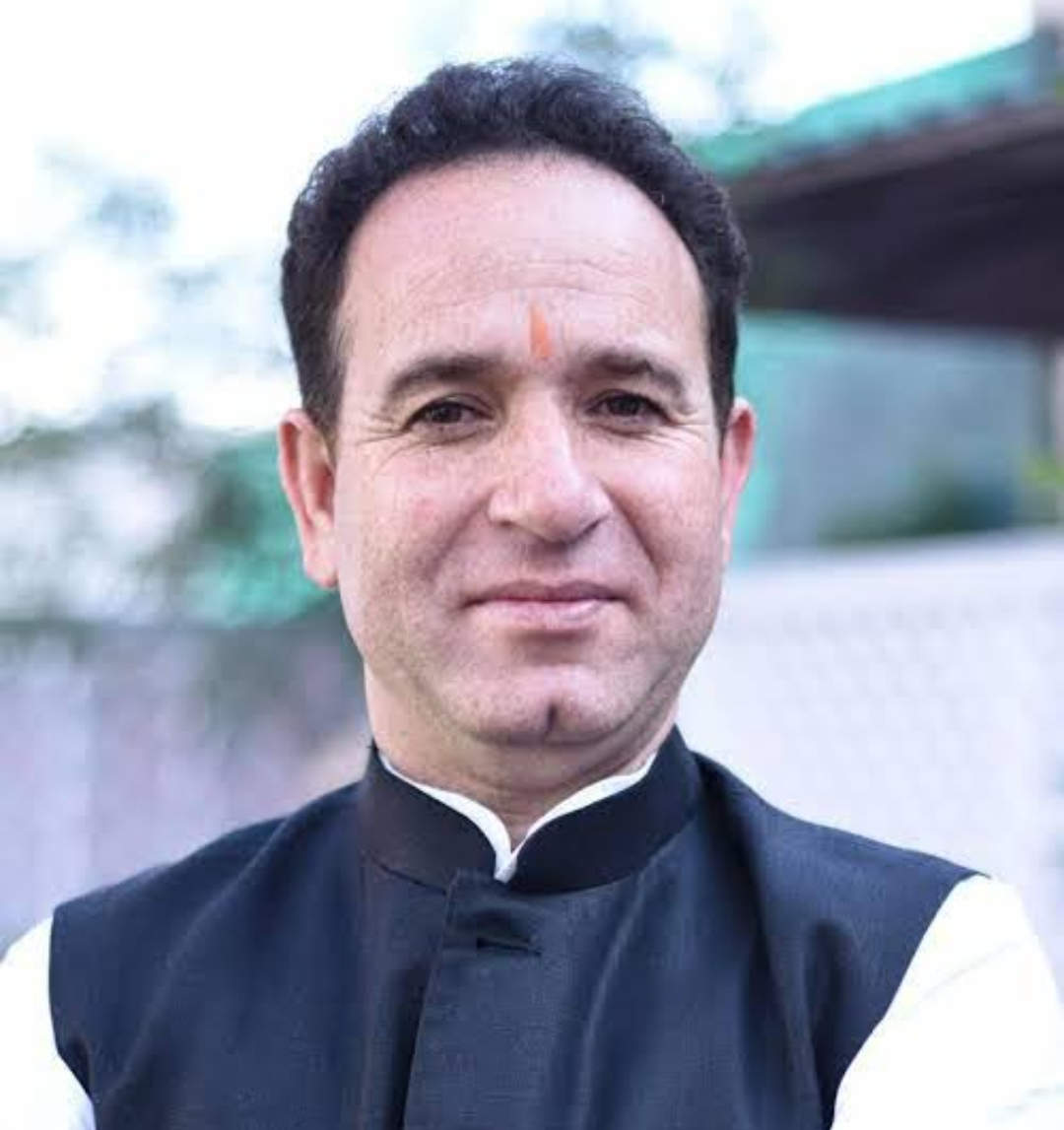

Leader of the Opposition in the Jammu and Kashmir Legislative Assembly
- Incumbent
- Assumed office 3 November 2024
- Deputy: Pawan Kumar Gupta; Surjeet Singh Slathia
- Chief Minister: Omar Abdullah
- Preceded by: Omar Abdullah

Minister of State, Government of Jammu and Kashmir
- In office 1 March 2015 – 19 June 2018
- Governor: N. N. Vohra
- Cabinet: Mehbooba Mufti ministry
- Chief Minister: Mufti Mohammad Sayed; Mehbooba Mufti
- Ministry and Departments: Transport (Independent charge), Revenue, Public Works (Roads & Buildings), Rural Development & Panchayati Raj, Agriculture Production, YSS
- Preceded by: Qamar Ali Akhoon; Ali Mohammad Sagar; Nasir Aslam Wani
- Succeeded by: Satish Sharma

Member of Jammu and Kashmir Legislative Assembly
- Incumbent
- Assumed office 8 October 2024
- Preceded by: Office established
- Constituency: Padder–Nagseni
- In office 23 December 2014 – 21 November 2018
- Preceded by: Sajjad Ahmed Kichloo
- Succeeded by: Shagun Parihar
- Constituency: Kishtwar

Personal details
- Party: Bhartiya Janata Party

Sunil Kumar Sharma is an Indian politician from Kishtwar area of Jammu and Kashmir who is currently serving as the Leader of Opposition in the Jammu and Kashmir Legislative Assembly. He is a member of the Bharatiya Janata Party.

Sharma was a member of the Jammu and Kashmir Legislative Assembly from the Kishtwar constituency in Kishtwar District. He won the 2024 elections from Padder-Nagseni. Before 2018, he was Minister of State for Transport (Independent charge), Revenue, Public Works (Roads & Buildings), Rural Development & Panchayati Raj, Agriculture Production, YSS in Government of Jammu and Kashmir under Mehbooba Mufti.

He was upgraded to cabinet ministry PDD department in Jammu and Kashmir government.

Following 2024 Assembly Elections, he was elected as Leader of Opposition of Jammu and Kashmir Legislative Assembly by his party.

== Electoral performance ==
Election	Constituency	Party	Result	Votes %	Opposition Candidate	Opposition Party	Opposition vote %	Ref
2024	Padder–Nagseni	BJP	Won	50.41%	Pooja Thakur	JKNC	45.83%	
2014	Kishtwar	BJP	Won	45.37%	Sajjad Ahmed Kichloo	JKNC	40.76%	
2008	Kishtwar	BJP	Lost	32.68%	Sajjad Ahmad Kichloo	JKNC	37.48%	
