= Kishtwar Assembly constituency =

Constituency of the Jammu and Kashmir Legislative Assembly

Coordinates: 33.32°N 75.77°E

Kishtwar
- Constituency No. 49 for the Jammu and Kashmir Legislative Assembly

Constituency details
- Country: India
- State: Jammu and Kashmir
- District: Kishtwar
- Lok Sabha constituency: Udhampur
- Established: 1962

Member of Legislative Assembly
- Incumbent Shagun Parihar
- Party: BJP
- Alliance: NDA
- Elected year: 2024

Kishtwar Assembly constituency is one of the 90 constituencies in the Jammu and Kashmir Legislative Assembly of Jammu and Kashmir a north state of India. Kishtwar is also part of Udhampur Lok Sabha constituency.

== Members of the Legislative Assembly ==
| Election | Member | Party |
|---|---|---|
| 1962 | Syed Mir Badshah | Jammu and Kashmir National Conference |
| 1967 | Ghulam Mustafa | Indian National Congress |
| 1972 | Pir Nizamuddin | Indian National Congress |
| 1977 | Bashir Ahmad Kichloo | Jammu and Kashmir National Conference |
| 1983 | Ghulam Hussain Arman | Indian National Congress |
| 1987 | Bashir Ahmad Kichloo | Jammu and Kashmir National Conference |
| 1996 | Bashir Ahmad Kichloo | Jammu and Kashmir National Conference |
| 2002 | Sajjad Ahmad Kichloo | Jammu and Kashmir National Conference |
| 2008 | Sajjad Ahmad Kichloo | Jammu and Kashmir National Conference |
| 2014 | Sunil Kumar Sharma | Bharatiya Janata Party |
| 2024 | Shagun Parihar | Bharatiya Janata Party |

== Election results ==
=== Assembly Election 2024 ===
2024 Jammu and Kashmir Legislative Assembly election : Kishtwar
| Party | Candidate | Votes | % | ±% |
|---|---|---|---|---|
| BJP | Shagun Parihar | 29,053 | 48.00% | ▲2.63 |
| JKNC | Sajjad Ahmed Kichloo | 28,532 | 47.14% | ▲6.38 |
| JKPDP | Firdoos Ahmed Tak | 997 | 1.65% | ▼8.76 |
| Independent | Roop Lal | 571 | 0.94% | New |
| BSP | Sumit Kumar | 441 | 0.73% | New |
| NOTA | None of the Above | 615 | 1.02% | ▲0.56 |
| Margin of victory | | 521 | 0.86% | ▼3.75 |
| Turnout | | 60,524 | 81.28% | ▲3.18 |
| Registered electors | | 74,466 | | ▼5.95 |
| BJP hold | | Swing | ▲2.63 | |

=== Assembly Election 2014 ===
2014 Jammu and Kashmir Legislative Assembly election : Kishtwar
| Party | Candidate | Votes | % | ±% |
|---|---|---|---|---|
| BJP | Sunil Kumar Sharma | 28,054 | 45.37% | ▲12.69 |
| JKNC | Sajjad Ahmed Kichloo | 25,202 | 40.76% | ▲3.28 |
| JKPDP | Firdous Ahmed Tak | 6,432 | 10.40% | ▼9.85 |
| INC | Nek Ram | 782 | 1.26% | ▼1.89 |
| NOTA | None of the Above | 279 | 0.45% | New |
| Margin of victory | | 2,852 | 4.61% | ▼0.19 |
| Turnout | | 61,832 | 78.10% | ▲3.64 |
| Registered electors | | 79,174 | | ▲14.79 |
| BJP gain from JKNC | | Swing | ▲7.89 | |

=== Assembly Election 2008 ===
2008 Jammu and Kashmir Legislative Assembly election : Kishtwar
| Party | Candidate | Votes | % | ±% |
|---|---|---|---|---|
| JKNC | Sajjad Ahmad Kichloo | 19,248 | 37.48% | ▼3.84 |
| BJP | Sunil Kumar Sharma | 16,783 | 32.68% | New |
| JKPDP | Syed Asgar Ali | 10,403 | 20.26% | New |
| INC | Thakur Jugal Bhandari | 1,621 | 3.16% | ▼34.06 |
| Jammu & Kashmir Democratic Party Nationalist | Siddharth Metha | 883 | 1.72% | New |
| Independent | Mohammad Ashraf Giri | 689 | 1.34% | New |
| Independent | Gurnam Singh | 473 | 0.92% | New |
| Margin of victory | | 2,465 | 4.80% | ▲0.69 |
| Turnout | | 51,356 | 74.46% | ▲19.64 |
| Registered electors | | 68,974 | | ▼6.59 |
| JKNC hold | | Swing | ▼3.84 | |

=== Assembly Election 2002 ===
2002 Jammu and Kashmir Legislative Assembly election : Kishtwar
| Party | Candidate | Votes | % | ±% |
|---|---|---|---|---|
| JKNC | Sajjad Hussain | 16,725 | 41.32% | ▼9.28 |
| INC | Ghulam Haider Sheikh | 15,062 | 37.21% | ▲33.55 |
| Independent | Rajinder Singh | 6,551 | 16.19% | New |
| Independent | Ravinder Kumar | 536 | 1.32% | New |
| JD(S) | Bashir Ahmed | 522 | 1.29% | New |
| SS | Rajinder Kumar | 471 | 1.16% | New |
| BSP | Desh Raj | 356 | 0.88% | ▼1.34 |
| Margin of victory | | 1,663 | 4.11% | ▼15.66 |
| Turnout | | 40,473 | 54.82% | ▼13.14 |
| Registered electors | | 73,838 | | ▲41.95 |
| JKNC hold | | Swing | ▼9.28 | |

=== Assembly Election 1996 ===
1996 Jammu and Kashmir Legislative Assembly election : Kishtwar
| Party | Candidate | Votes | % | ±% |
|---|---|---|---|---|
| JKNC | Bashir Ahmed Kichloo | 17,889 | 50.61% | ▼17.35 |
| BJP | Rajinder Singh | 10,900 | 30.84% | ▲18.37 |
| Independent | Abdul Majid Malik | 2,465 | 6.97% | New |
| JD | Abdul Gani | 1,810 | 5.12% | New |
| INC | Ghulam Hussain Arman | 1,294 | 3.66% | New |
| BSP | Hans Raj | 786 | 2.22% | New |
| Margin of victory | | 6,989 | 19.77% | ▼35.72 |
| Turnout | | 35,348 | 68.49% | ▼0.65 |
| Registered electors | | 52,016 | | ▲34.39 |
| JKNC hold | | Swing | ▼17.35 | |

=== Assembly Election 1987 ===
1987 Jammu and Kashmir Legislative Assembly election : Kishtwar
| Party | Candidate | Votes | % | ±% |
|---|---|---|---|---|
| JKNC | Bashir Ahmed Kichloo | 18,044 | 67.95% | ▲29.89 |
| BJP | Man Mohan | 3,309 | 12.46% | ▲7.96 |
| Independent | Wali Mohammed | 2,640 | 9.94% | New |
| LKD | Hari Krishan | 1,682 | 6.33% | New |
| Independent | Janki Nath | 542 | 2.04% | New |
| JKNPP | Chuni Lal Wazer | 336 | 1.27% | New |
| Margin of victory | | 14,735 | 55.49% | ▲41.93 |
| Turnout | | 26,553 | 69.85% | ▼2.20 |
| Registered electors | | 38,706 | | ▲15.83 |
| JKNC gain from INC | | Swing | ▲16.33 | |

=== Assembly Election 1983 ===
1983 Jammu and Kashmir Legislative Assembly election : Kishtwar
| Party | Candidate | Votes | % | ±% |
|---|---|---|---|---|
| INC | Ghulam Hussain Arman | 12,213 | 51.63% | ▲44.85 |
| JKNC | Bashir Ahmed Kichloo | 9,004 | 38.06% | ▲10.91 |
| BJP | Seva Ram Parihat | 1,066 | 4.51% | New |
| Independent | Abdul Hamid | 515 | 2.18% | New |
| Independent | Ghulam Mohammed | 447 | 1.89% | New |
| Independent | Jagat Ram | 201 | 0.85% | New |
| Margin of victory | | 3,209 | 13.56% | ▲9.92 |
| Turnout | | 23,657 | 72.20% | ▲21.47 |
| Registered electors | | 33,415 | | ▲14.47 |
| INC gain from JKNC | | Swing | ▲24.47 | |

=== Assembly Election 1977 ===
1977 Jammu and Kashmir Legislative Assembly election : Kishtwar
| Party | Candidate | Votes | % | ±% |
|---|---|---|---|---|
| JKNC | Bashir Ahmed Kichloo | 3,910 | 27.15% | New |
| JP | Ghulam Hussain Arman | 3,385 | 23.51% | New |
| Independent | Manmohan Pargal | 1,797 | 12.48% | New |
| Independent | Sewa Ram | 1,675 | 11.63% | New |
| Independent | Abdul Majid | 1,636 | 11.36% | New |
| INC | Pir Mizam Ud Din | 975 | 6.77% | ▼53.74 |
| Independent | Riaz Ahmed | 448 | 3.11% | New |
| Margin of victory | | 525 | 3.65% | ▼32.12 |
| Turnout | | 14,399 | 51.10% | ▼4.80 |
| Registered electors | | 29,192 | | ▲2.98 |
| JKNC gain from INC | | Swing | ▼33.35 | |

=== Assembly Election 1972 ===
1972 Jammu and Kashmir Legislative Assembly election : Kishtwar
| Party | Candidate | Votes | % | ±% |
|---|---|---|---|---|
| INC | Pir Nizam Ud Din | 9,283 | 60.51% | ▼8.57 |
| Independent | Ghulam Hussain Arman | 3,796 | 24.74% | New |
| ABJS | Jia Lal Shan | 2,054 | 13.39% | New |
| SSP | Hem Raj | 209 | 1.36% | New |
| Margin of victory | | 5,487 | 35.76% | ▼2.38 |
| Turnout | | 15,342 | 54.91% | ▲12.62 |
| Registered electors | | 28,347 | | ▲5.18 |
| INC hold | | Swing | ▼8.57 | |

=== Assembly Election 1967 ===
1967 Jammu and Kashmir Legislative Assembly election : Kishtwar
| Party | Candidate | Votes | % | ±% |
|---|---|---|---|---|
| INC | G. Mustafa | 7,726 | 69.07% | New |
| Independent | G. Nabi | 3,459 | 30.93% | New |
| Margin of victory | | 4,267 | 38.15% | ▼13.70 |
| Turnout | | 11,185 | 44.82% | ▼30.55 |
| Registered electors | | 26,950 | | ▼1.63 |
| INC gain from JKNC | | Swing | ▼6.85 | |

=== Assembly Election 1962 ===
1962 Jammu and Kashmir Legislative Assembly election : Kishtwar
| Party | Candidate | Votes | % | ±% |
|---|---|---|---|---|
| JKNC | Syed Mir Badshah | 14,988 | 75.93% | New |
| JPP | Sewa Ram | 4,752 | 24.07% | New |
| Margin of victory | | 10,236 | 51.85% | |
| Turnout | | 20,532 | 74.94% | |
| Registered electors | | 27,397 | | |
| JKNC win (new seat) | | | | |

== See also ==
- List of constituencies of the Jammu and Kashmir Legislative Assembly
- Kishtwar district
