= Chatroo =

Village and subdivision in Jammu and Kashmir, India

- Village and Subdivision
- Location in Jammu and Kashmir, India Chatroo (India)
- Coordinates: 33.334024°N 75.716435°E
- Country: India
- Union Territory: Jammu and Kashmir
- Division: Jammu
- Region: Chenab Valley
- District: Kishtwar

Population (2011)
  - Total: 44,087
- Time zone: UTC+5:30 (IST)

Chatroo is a small village and an administrative subdivision located in the Kishtwar district of the Indian Union Territory of Jammu and Kashmir.

== Geography ==
Chatroo is situated in a mountainous region of the Kishtwar district, surrounded by dense forests, rivers, and valleys. Its geographic location places it in a remote area, with challenging terrain that affects accessibility, particularly during the winter months when heavy snowfall can cut off-road connections.

== Administration ==
Chatroo serves as a subdivision within the Kishtwar district, meaning it has its own local administrative offices responsible for governance and service delivery. As part of the Union Territory of Jammu and Kashmir, it is under the jurisdiction of the Kishtwar district administration.

== Demographics ==
The population of Chatroo primarily consists of ethnic groups native to Jammu and Kashmir, including mostly Gujjars and Bakarwals, who are known for their semi-nomadic, pastoral lifestyles. Local languages include Kashmiri, Urdu, and Kishtwari.

== Tourism ==
Chatroo has recently gained attention as an offbeat tourist destination, attracting nature lovers, trekkers, and adventure enthusiasts with its untouched landscapes. Some nearby points of interest include:

- Kishtwar National Park, home to wildlife species such as the snow leopard, ibex, and Himalayan brown bear.
- Local shrines and temples, offering insights into the cultural and religious practices of the region.

== See also ==
- Kishtwar district
- Jammu and Kashmir (union territory)
- Kishtwar National Park
- Gujjars
- Bakarwal
