= Kalnai River =

Tributary of river Chenab in Jammu and Kashmir

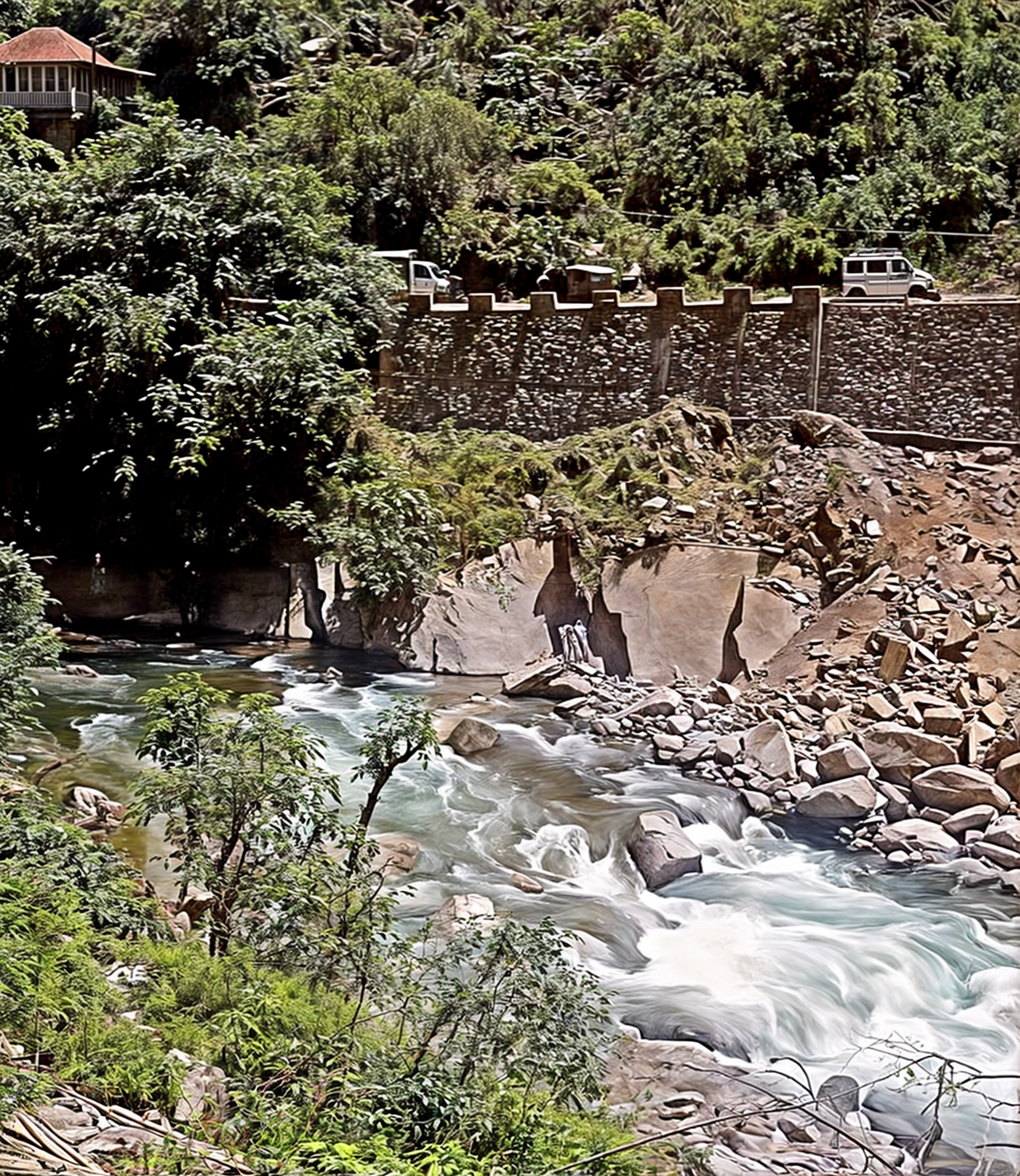
- Kalnai River Bunjwah

- Location within Jammu and Kashmir Location within India

Location
- Country: India
- Flows through: Bunjwah-Donadi-Thathri in Jammu and Kashmir

Physical characteristics
- Source: Kalgoni Stream
  - location: Bunjwah
  - coordinates: 33.1277237°N 75.9235864°E
- Mouth: Chenab River
  - location: Thathri
  - coordinates: 33°08′43″N 75°47′28″E

The Kalnai River is a tributary of the Chenab River in the Bunjwah region bordering Kishtwar and Doda districts in Jammu and Kashmir. An under construction 48MW Lower Kalnai hydroelectric project is located at Donadi on this river.

== Course ==
The Kalnai River originates from the confluence of the Kalgoni Stream and the rivulet from the Bunjwah area at Donadi. The river flows through the Bhalessa region.

The river continues its journey, gradually gaining strength as it moves southeastwards. After a course of approximately 25 kilometers, it reaches the town of Thathri, where it finally joins the mighty Chenab River, whose waters were allocated to Pakistan under the terms of the Indus Waters Treaty.

== Dams ==
=== Lower Kalnai Hydroelectric Project ===
Lower Kalnai Hydroelectric Project (Donadi Hydroelectric Project), at Donadi is a 48 MW proposed hydropower project located on Kalnai river in the Doda district of Jammu and Kashmir. The project was awarded to a construction company in 2013 with an initial completion target of 2017, which left the project midway, resulting in the re-tendering of the project in 2019 with the revised detailed project report (DPR) and completion date of 2023. During the 2021 Indus Waters Treaty meeting, Pakistan raised objections to the designs of this project, which India justified its meets the conditions of the treaty, which stalled the construction of project. In April 2025 terminated the treaty, paving the way for expedited revival of the project by India.

== See also ==
- Rivers of Jammu and Kashmir
- Neeru river
- Chenab River
