= Ababil (Iranian missile) =

Iranian ballistic missile

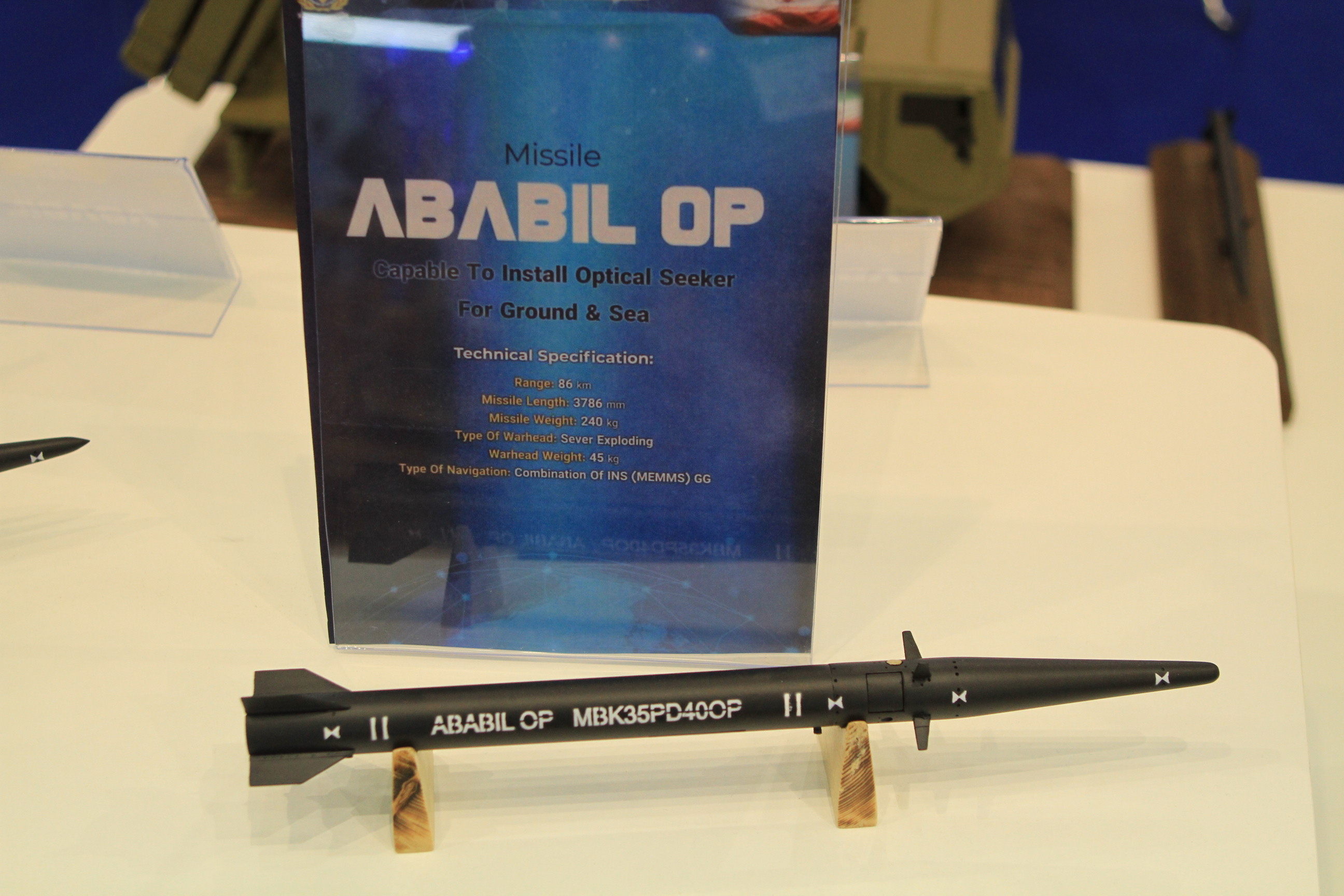
- Type: SRBM
- Place of origin: Iran

Service history
- In service: 14 August 2023 (unveiled)

Production history
- Manufacturer: IRGC AF

Specifications
- Length: 3.7 m (12 ft)

Ababil (Persian: ابابیل) is an Iranian ballistic missile designed and manufactured by the Aerospace Force of the Islamic Revolutionary Guard Corps. The missile was put on public display for the first time at a military exhibition in Russia, alongside other Iranian military products, such as drones and electronic warfare systems. The exhibition was unveiled on Monday, August 14, 2023, at the Army-2023 international military-technical forum held in Patriot Park, near Moscow. The Ababil missile is 3.7 meters long, weighs 240 kilograms, and has a 45-kilogram warhead. This missile boasts a range of 86 kilometers and can be fitted with a ground-based optical seeker.

== See also ==
- Fateh-110
- Fateh-313
- Dezful (missile)
- List of military equipment manufactured in Iran
- Science and technology in Iran
