= Kiru Hydroelectric Project =

- Location within Jammu and Kashmir Location within India
- Official name: Kiru HE Project
- Country: India
- Location: Kishtwar, Jammu and Kashmir
- Coordinates: 33.345309°N 75.955718°E
- Purpose: Power
- Status: Under Construction
- Construction began: 2019
- Owner: Chenab Valley Power Projects Limited

Dam and spillways
- Type of dam: Gravity
- Impounds: Chenab River
- Height: 135 m (443 ft)

Kiru Hydroelectric Project
- Coordinates: 33.345309°N 75.955718°E
- Turbines: 4 x 156 MW
- Installed capacity: 624 MW

Kiru HE Project, is an under construction Hydroelectric plant with 624 MW capacity in Kishtwar District of Jammu and Kashmir. The run-of-river system, being developed by Chenab Valley Power Projects Limited, a joint venture between NHPC (51 percent) and J&K State Power Development Corporation (49 percent). It is designed to generate 2272 million units annually once operational. Its foundation stone was laid in March 2019, following environmental clearance and the Cabinet approval granted in 2016. It has a 135 m high concrete gravity dam. Its power house is underground with 4 units of 156 MW each making total capacity of 624 MW. The project was originally scheduled for commissioning in September 2023, it underwent first revision to July 2025 before the latest postponement to the end of 2026. In April 2026, it achieved completion of 10 lakh cubic meters of dam concreting, out of a total target of 12 lakh cubic meters.

== See also ==
- Chenab river dams and hydroelectric projects
- Ratle Hydroelectric Plant – under construction downstream
- Baglihar Dam - operational downstream
