= Donadi =

Village in Jammu and Kashmir

- Village
- Donadi in Jammu and Kashmir, India
- Coordinates: 33.133750°N 75.853266°E
- Country: India
- Union territory: Jammu and Kashmir
- Region: Jammu region
- District: Doda
- Demonym: Bhalessi

Language
  - Spoken: Kashmiri, Gojri
  - Official: Urdu
- Time zone: UTC+5:30 (IST)
- Postal code: 182203

Donadi is a village in Kahara tehsil of Doda district in the Indian union territory of Jammu and Kashmir. It is famous for a hydroelectric power project called Lower Kalnie Power Project Donadi.

== Etymology ==
Donadi name is derived from Gojri language; Do means Two and Nadi means stream or rivulets. The two rivulets unite near Donadi which later forms a rivulet known as Kalnai.

== Location ==
Donadi is located on Thathri-Gandoh highway 9 kilometres (5.6 mi) from National Highway 244 near Thathri town.
