= Shagun Parihar =

Indian politician

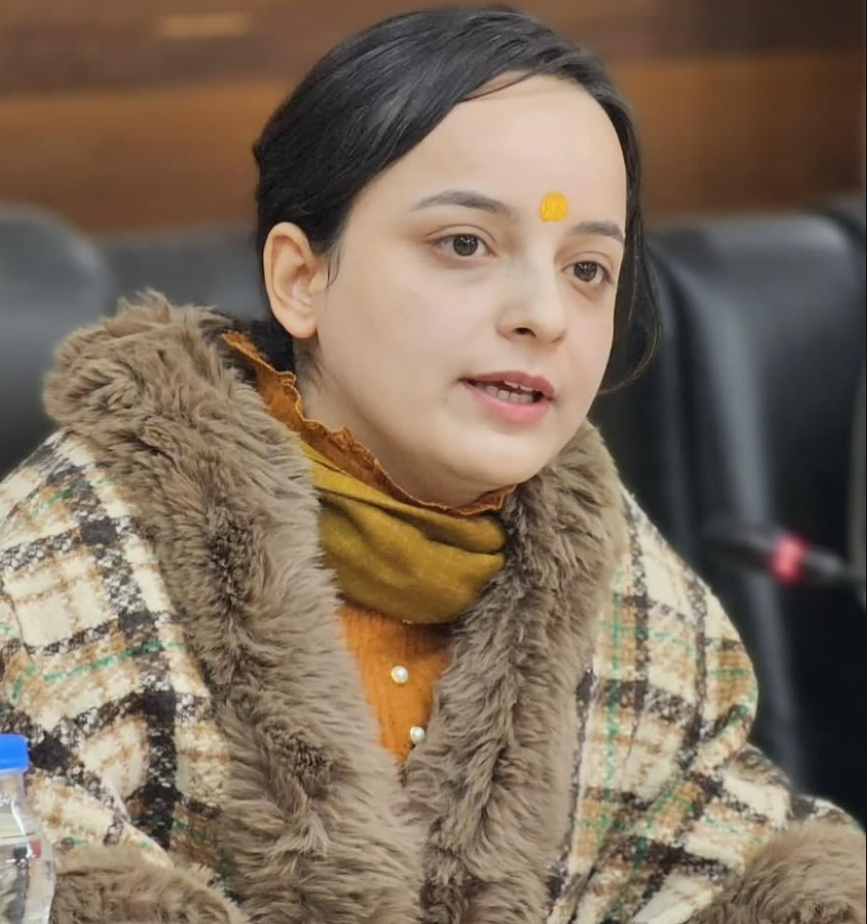

Member of Jammu and Kashmir Legislative Assembly
- Incumbent
- Assumed office 8 October 2024
- Preceded by: Sunil Kumar Sharma
- Constituency: Kishtwar

Personal details
- Party: Bharatiya Janata Party
- Profession: Politician

Shagun Parihar is an Indian politician from Jammu & Kashmir. She is a Member of the Jammu & Kashmir Legislative Assembly from 2024, representing Kishtwar Assembly constituency as a Member of the Bharatiya Janta Party. At the age of 29 years, She is the youngest winner in the 2024 Jammu and Kashmir Legislative Assembly election.

== Early life and education ==
Shagun's father Ajit Parihar, a BJP functionary and her uncle Anil were killed by Hizbul Mujahideen terrorists in 2018, just days before the panchayat elections. However, she continued with her studies and at the time of her election to the Legislative Assembly, she was also pursuing her PhD.

== Electoral performance ==
Election	Constituency	Party	Result	Votes %	Opposition Candidate	Opposition Party	Opposition vote %	Ref
2024	Kishtwar	BJP	Won	48.00%	Sajjad Ahmed Kichloo	JKNC	47.14%	

== See also ==
- 2024 Jammu & Kashmir Legislative Assembly election
- Jammu and Kashmir Legislative Assembly
