= Mughal Maidan =

Mughal Maidan مغل میدان
- Tehsil
- Location in Jammu and Kashmir, India Mughal Maidan (India)
- Coordinates: 33°23′42″N 75°39′45″E
- Country: India
- Union Territory: Jammu and Kashmir
- Division: Jammu
- Region: Chenab Valley
- District: Kishtwar

Population (2011)
  - Total: 25,827

Mughal Maidan is a tehsil in the Kishtwar district of the Jammu and Kashmir union territory, India. It is situated about 22 kilometers from the town of Kishtwar and lies on the banks of the Chatroo river.

== History ==
Mughal Maidan is historically notable as a site where the Mughals reportedly fought a battle against Kishtwar's rulers while advancing via Sinthan and Singhpora passes. The area has a legacy associated with the Mughal period, lending it historical and cultural importance.

== Geography ==
Mughal Maidan is located at an elevation of approximately 1,500 meters (4,921 feet). The village serves as the starting point for a scenic trek to the Kashmir Valley via the Singhpora pass, which culminates at Vailo near Kokarnag. The trek passes through mountainous terrain, reaching a height of 11,570 feet (3,527 meters).

== Demographics ==
As per the 2011 Census of India, Mughal Maidan has a population of 25,827 residing in 5,773 households. It is part of a block that includes 15 panchayats, indicating its administrative significance.

== See also ==
- Kishtwar district
- Chenab Valley
- Sinthan Top
- Kokarnag
