= Dul Hasti Hydroelectric Plant =

Dul Hasti Dam
- Location within Jammu and Kashmir Location within India
- Country: India
- Location: Kishtwar, Jammu and Kashmir
- Coordinates: 33.3692°N 75.7984°E
- Purpose: Power
- Status: Operational
- Construction began: 1985
- Opening date: 2007; 19 years ago
- Owner: NHPC

Dam and spillways
- Type of dam: Gravity
- Impounds: Chenab River
- Height: 70 m (230 ft)
- Length: 190 m (620 ft)
- Elevation at crest: 1,250 metres (4,100 ft)
- Spillway capacity: 8,000 m^{3}/s (280,000 cu ft/s)

Dul Hasti Hydroelectric Plant
- Coordinates: 33.2869°N 75.7621°E
- Commission date: 2007
- Hydraulic head: 200 metres (660 ft)
- Turbines: 3 x 130 MW Francis-type
- Installed capacity: 390 MW

Dul Hasti hydroelectric power project, includes the existing Dul Hasti Stage-I Hydroelectric Power Project with 390 MW capacity and the under-construction Dul Hasti Stage-II Hydroelectric Power Project with 260 MW capacity, in Kishtwar district of Jammu and Kashmir in India built and operated by NHPC. Stage-I has been generating over 2000 million units of electricity per year.

== Stages ==
=== Dul Hasti Stage-I ===
Dul Hasti Stage-I was conceived in 1985 at the initial project cost of 1.6 billion rupees (about $50 million), which kept ring to 4.5 billion rupees and later successively to 8, 11, 16, and 24 billion rupees (nearly $750 million) due to numerous delays. Construction begun in 1985 and the project became operational on 7 April 2007 after the completion of construction.

The Dam is 70 m (230 ft) high and 186 m (610 ft) long, with run-of-the-river type power plant, equipped with low-level gated spillways which can be used to flush silt load. (Note: The elimination of low-level spillways at the earlier Salal Dam has caused silt to build up, damaging the sustainability of the that project. Pakistan does not appear to have objected to the gated spillways at Dul Hasti.) Constructed on the Chenab River, in a rugged, mountainous section of the Himalayas, and several hundred kilometers from larger cities in the Jammu Division, it diverts water through a 9.5 km (5.9 mi) long headrace tunnel to the power station which discharges back into the Chenab. The project provides peaking power to the Northern Grid with beneficiary states being Jammu and Kashmir, Punjab, Haryana, Uttar Pradesh, Uttarakhand, Rajasthan, Delhi and Union Territory of Chandigarh.

=== Dul Hasti Stage-II ===
Dul Hasti Stage-II Hydroelectric Power Project is an extension of the existing Dulhasti Stage-1 plant. Similar to Stage I, it will be built on the Chenab river in the Kishtwar district in Jammu and Kashmir. It was approved by India's Ministry of Environment in December 2025, which allows for construction tenders to be issued as a next step.

== See also ==
- Chenab river dams and hydroelectric projects
- Ratle Hydroelectric Plant – under construction downstream

== Bibliography ==
- Dar, Zubair Ahmad (2012), Power Projects in Jammu & Kashmir: Controversy, Law and Justice (PDF), Harvard Law & International Development Society
