= Kishtwar National Park =

National park in Jammu and Kashmir, India

- IUCN category II (national park)
- Location within Jammu and Kashmir Location within India
- Interactive map of Kishtwar National Park
- Location: Kishtwar district, Jammu and Kashmir, India
- Coordinates: 33.61°N 75.99°E
- Area: 2,190.5 km^{2} (845.8 sq mi)
- Established: 1981

Kishtwar National Park is a national park located 40 km from Kishtwar town in the Kishtwar district of Jammu and Kashmir, India. It is bounded to the north by Rinnay river, to the south by Kibar Nala catchment, to the east by the main divide of Great Himalaya, and to the west by Marwah river.

== Date and history of establishment ==
It was declared a National Park on 4 February 1981 (Notification no. 21/FST of 1980-1981).

- Area 2,190.50 square kilometres (219,050 ha)
- Land Tenure state
- Altitude Ranges from 1,700 m to 4,800 m

== Physical features ==
The National Park encompasses the catchments of Kiar, Nath and Kibar Nalas, all of which drain south-west into Marwah River (also known as Marusudar River) which joins the Chenab River just below the Kishtwar Town at Bhandarkoot village. The terrain is generally rugged and steep, with narrow valleys bounded by high ridges opening in their upper glacial parts. The area lies in the Central Crystalline belt of the Great Himalayas. Rocks are strongly folded in places and composed mainly of granite, gneiss and schist, with the occasional bed of marble. The shallow, slightly alkaline soils are mostly alluvial with gravel deposits.

== Climate ==
The influence of the monsoon is weak. Mean annual rainfall at palmar and Sirshi (1,761 m), located near the periphery of the national park, is 827 mm and 741 mm, respectively, precipitation is maximal and in excess of 100 mm per month in March and April, and again in July and August. Most snow fall in December and January when the whole area becomes snowbound. Mean maximum and minimum temperatures recorded at Sirshi are 13^{0} and -7^{0} in January and 35^{0}c and 11^{0}c in July respectively.

== Vegetation ==
Based on revised classification of Champion and Seth (1968), some 13 vegetation types are represented. In general, silver fir 'Abies pindrow' and spruce 'Picea wallichian', mixed with cedar Cedrus deodar and blue pine Pinus griffithii are predominant from 2,400m to 3,000m. Notable is the small expanse of chilgoza pine Pinus geradiana in the Dachan Range. At lower altitudes (1,700-2,400m) occur nearly pure stands of cedar and blue pine, and moist temperate deciduous forest, represented by horsechestnut, Aesculus indica, walnut Juglans regia, maple, Acer spp. poplar, Populus ciliata, hazel Corylus cornutam bird cherry Pasus corfnuta, ash Fraxinus cornuta and yew Taxus wallichiana. The sub-alpine zone, from 3,000m to the tree line at 3,700m, supports mostly silver fir and birch Betula utilis forest and this merges with birch -rhododendron Rhododendron campanulatum scrub, above which is alpine pasture.

Among the animals that make their home here include the Himalayan snowcock and the brown bear.

== Cultural heritage ==
Racial groups include Kashmiris, Thakurs, Gujars, Rajputs and Brahmans, Bhagats.

== Local human population ==
There are permanent settlements but some 1,115 families of nomadic graziers, with 25,000 head of livestock, and an unspecified number of families from nearby villages, with 10,000 head, have grazing rights in the national park. Some agriculture is practised in peripheral areas.
