= Marusudar River =

River tributary in Jammu and Kashmir

Marusudar
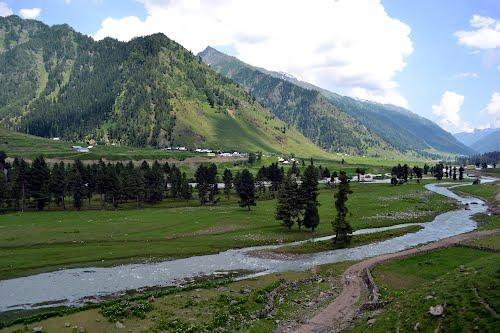

- River map of Jammu and Kashmir

Location
- Country: India
- Flows through: Marwah-Dachhan in Kishtwar district, Jammu and Kashmir

Physical characteristics
- Source: Nunkun glacier
  - location: Warwan Valley, Kishtwar, Jammu and Kashmir, India
  - coordinates: 33°27′25.77″N 75°48′48.99″E
- Mouth: Chenab river
  - location: Bhandarkoot, Kishtwar district, Jammu and Kashmir
- Length: 133 km (83 mi) approx.

Basin features
- Dams: Pakal Dul Dam, Bursar Dam

Marusudar river or Maru Sudar river is the largest river tributary of the Chenab River, beginning at the Nunkun glacier of the Warwan Valley and joining the Chenab at Bhandarkoot in the Kishtwar district. As of 2021, 1000MW Pakal Dul Dam the 800MW Bursar Hydroelectric Project are under construction on this river.

== Course ==
The Marusudar river originates from the Nunkun glacier of the Warwan Valley of the Kishtwar district and joins the Chenab river at Bhandarkoot, Kishtwar. It is 133 kilometres (83 mi) long and the largest river tributary to the Chenab river.

== Dams ==
This river has the following dams

- Pakal Dul Dam, 1000 W, 109 MCM, near Drangdhuran village in Kishtwar district of the Indian Jammu and Kashmir, upstream of Bursar Hydroelectric Power Project.
- Bursar Hydroelectric Power Project, 800 MW, 618 MCM, near Pakal village in the Kishtwar district, proposed stalled project was expedited in April 2025 after the termination of IWT. In 2017, the proposal was granted the environmental approval by MoEF, after considering locals concerns, who cited the Environmental Impact Assessment (EIA) that the Bursar Dam project will affect 18 hamlets, 17,000 people, 1150 ha of forest clearing, fish migration.

== See also ==
- Dams on Chenab
- Rivers of Jammu and Kashmir
