= Warwan Valley =

Valley in Jammu and Kashmir, India

- Tehsil
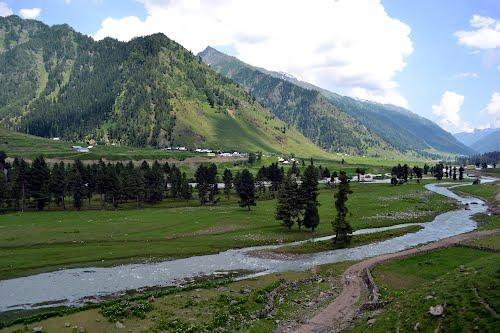
- Warwan Valley
- Nickname: Wadwan
- Interactive map of Warwan Valley
- Coordinates: 33°51′51″N 75°32′07″E
- Country: India
- Union Territory: Jammu and Kashmir
- Division: Jammu
- District: Kishtwar
- Headquarters: WARWAN

Population (2011)
  - Total: 35,572

Society
  - Languages: Kashmiri
- Time zone: UTC+5:30 (IST)
- PIN: 182205

The Warwan Valley is a Himalayan sub-valley and a tehsil in Kishtwar District in the Jammu division in union territory of Jammu and Kashmir in India. The Valley lies 68 kilometres (42 mi) northeast of Kishtwar and 260 kilometres (160 mi) from Jammu, the winter capital of Jammu and Kashmir.

It falls under the jurisdiction of Kishtwar district in Marwah sub-Division of Jammu and Kashmir.

== Geology ==
The Warwan Valley is drained by the Warwan River. It is a river formed by the confluence of the Batkot and Gumbar streams. The river is called Marusudar in the lower reaches of the valley and is the biggest right tributary of the Chenab River which in turn is a tributary of the Indus River system.

A geological mapping survey has revealed that the Warwan Valley has experienced three distinct phases of folding in polyphase deformation.

Stratigraphic succession from oldest to youngest:
Proterozoic	Paleozoic	Triassic	Jurassic
Salkhala Group	Ramsu-Machhal Formation; Lolab Formation; Karihul Formation; Margan Formation; Muth Quartzite; Syringothyris Limestone; Fenestella Shale; Agglomeratic Slate; Panjal Volcanics; Zewan Formation	Khunamuh Formation; Khrew Formation; Wuyan Formation	Drumgam Formation

== Geography ==
Warwan valley in J & K

The Warwan is a Himalayan valley situated at an altitude of 2,134 m (7,001 ft) above sea level. It is bordered by main Kashmir Valley in the north and Ladakh in the east. Its parent district Kishtwar lies in the south. A few villages are Sukhnai, Margi, Busmina, Aftee and Inshan. Its main crops are wheat, paddy, trumba, potatoes etc. Its soil is not fertile as such it is sandy. Warwan valley receives a huge amount of snowfall in winters as it is at altitude of 2134 m above sea level.

== Religion ==
The region has a Muslim majority population, with a significant Hindu minority.

Religion in Marwah (2011)
1. Islam (79.1%)
2. Hinduism (20.8%)
3. Christianity (0.14%)
4. Other / Unstated (0.03%)

== Language ==
The vast majority of the population speaks Kashmiri.

Languages of Marwah (2011)
1. Kashmiri (98.6%)
2. Gojri (0.57%)
3. Dogri (0.33%)
4. Ladakhi (0.30%)
5. Other (0.16%)

== Flora and fauna ==
About 75% of the valley remains under vegetation-cover and a total of 285 plant species, belonging to 191 genera in 60 families were recorded in a floristic survey, conducted in 2015. Among these plant species, 26 are categorised as threatened. The main flowering season in the valley is June to July. The valley is rich in medicinal plants, which are used to treat ailments of the local people.

== Accessibility ==
Warwan Valley is one of the most remote valleys of Jammu and Kashmir and it suffers from a lack of access to proper roads, communication facilities and electricity. The valley remains cut off for about six or seven months every year due to heavy snowfall. In 2016, Margi village of the valley got completely destroyed by fire.
