= Ratle Hydroelectric Plant =

Ratle Dam
- Location within Jammu and Kashmir Location within India
- Country: India
- Location: Drabshalla, Kishtwar district, Jammu and Kashmir
- Coordinates: 33°10′55″N 75°48′19″E
- Purpose: Power
- Status: Under construction
- Construction began: 2022
- Opening date: 2028 (est.)
- Owner: NHPC Limited

Dam and spillways
- Type of dam: Gravity
- Impounds: Chenab River
- Height: 133 m (436 ft)

Reservoir
- Total capacity: 78,710,000 m3
- Active capacity: 23,860,000 m^{3} (19,340 acre⋅ft)
- Inactive capacity: 54,850,000 m3
- Maximum water depth: 109 m
- Normal elevation: 1,029 m msl

Ratle Hydroelectric Plant
- Coordinates: 33°9′9.21″N 75°45′05.68″E
- Type: 4 x 205 MW, 1 x 30 MW Francis-type
- Hydraulic head: 100.39 m (329.4 ft)
- Installed capacity: 850 MW

Ratle Hydroelectric Plant project, including a 133 m (436 ft) tall gravity dam and two power stations adjacent to one another, is a run-of-the-river hydroelectric power station, currently under construction on the Chenab River, downstream of the village near Drabshalla in Kishtwar district of the Indian Union Territory of Jammu and Kashmir. Water from the dam will be diverted through four intake tunnels about 400 m (0.25 mi) southwest to the power stations. The main power station will contain four 205 MW Francis turbines and the auxiliary power station will contain one 30 MW Francis turbine. The installed capacity of both power stations will be 850 MW. Though the pondage of the project is within the limit permitted under the India-Pakistan Indus Water Treaty (IWT), Pakistan has frequently tried to cause roadblocks for the project with allegation that it violates the Indus Waters Treaty, India unilaterally suspended the IWT in April 2025 to mitigate any roadblocks from Pakistan.

== History ==
=== Project conception ===
In June 2010, Prime Minister Manmohan Singh approved the project and chief minister Omar Abdullah initiated the tendering process for construction of 690 MW Rattle HEP. In October 2012, the Jammu and Kashmir state cabinet approved the enhanced capacity from 690 MW to 850 MW, Prime Minister Manmohan Singh laid the foundation stone in June 2013, and in October 2013 the project was awarded to Hyderabad-based GVK Energy Limited on a build-own-operate-transfer basis for a 35 year period.

=== IWT dispute ===
In 2017, Pakistan wanted a Court of Arbitration (CoA) to decide the disputed issues. India had instead sought for a Neutral Expert. Pakistan raised objections citing violations of the Indus Water Treaty (IWT) which were being parallelly undergoing arbitration by a Court of Arbitration (CoA) and a World Bank-appointed Neutral Expert in 2022. The disputes points, mostly technical in nature, were raised on the project.

- Whether India’s proposed design for a maximum Pondage of 23.86 million cubic meters for the Ratle Hydroelectric Plant is based on a method of calculations that contravenes the Treaty, particularly Paragraph 8(c) of Annexure D?
- Whether India’s proposed design for submerged power intakes at the Ratle Hydroelectric Plant contravenes the Treaty, particularly Paragraph 8(f) of Annexure D?
- Whether India’s proposed design for low-level sediment outlets at the Ratle Hydroelectric Plant, in the form of a deep orifice spillway with five large, gated openings far below the Dead Storage Level and deep in the reservoir, contravenes the Treaty, particularly Paragraph 8(d) of Annexure D?
- Whether India’s proposed design for gated spillways for flood control at the Ratle Hydroelectric Plant, with the bottom level of the gates in a normally closed position located approximately 31 meters below the Dead Storage Level and deep in the reservoir, contravenes the Treaty, particularly Paragraph 8(e) of Annexure D?
- Whether India’s proposed design for 2 meters of freeboard at the Ratle Hydroelectric Plant contravenes the Treaty, particularly Paragraph 8(a) of Annexure D?

The CoA also indicated that the objections to the project were submitted by Pakistan after a period of three months not meeting the Annexure D (10) stipulation of IWT. Annexure D (10) says that if no objection is received by India from Pakistan within the specified period of three months, then Pakistan shall be deemed to have no objection to the project.

=== Construction ===
In November 2018, India decided to commence the construction of the project considering Pakistan's objection invalid under Indus Waters Treaty obligations, after the World Bank has informed India and Pakistan in August 2017 that construction by India meets the IWT conditions. Push for this was provided by the Prime Minister Narendra Modi to ensure that the water crisis for Punjab in India can be solved. After a February 2019 Memorandum of Understanding (MoU) between NHPC Limited, Jammu & Kashmir State Power Development Department (JKPDD) and J&K State Power Development Corporation (JKSPDC), the construction works by India started in December 2019, triggering new protest by Pakistan to World Bank against the dam. In January 2022, after various delays the construction of the project finally commenced by the EPC contractor "Megha Engineering Ltd".

== Details ==
The 850MW facility is expected to generate up to 3,136 million units of electricity in a year. The Public Investment Board (PIB) of the Ministry of Finance, Government of India, recommended an investment approval of $690m (Rs52.82bn) for the project in September 2020.

== Current status ==
- May 2025: Ratle project was 21% complete, IWT was suspended by India, expected completion date was revised to 2028.

== See also ==
- Chenab river basin dams and hydroelectric projects
