= Chenab River =

River in India and Pakistan

Chenab Chandrabhaga
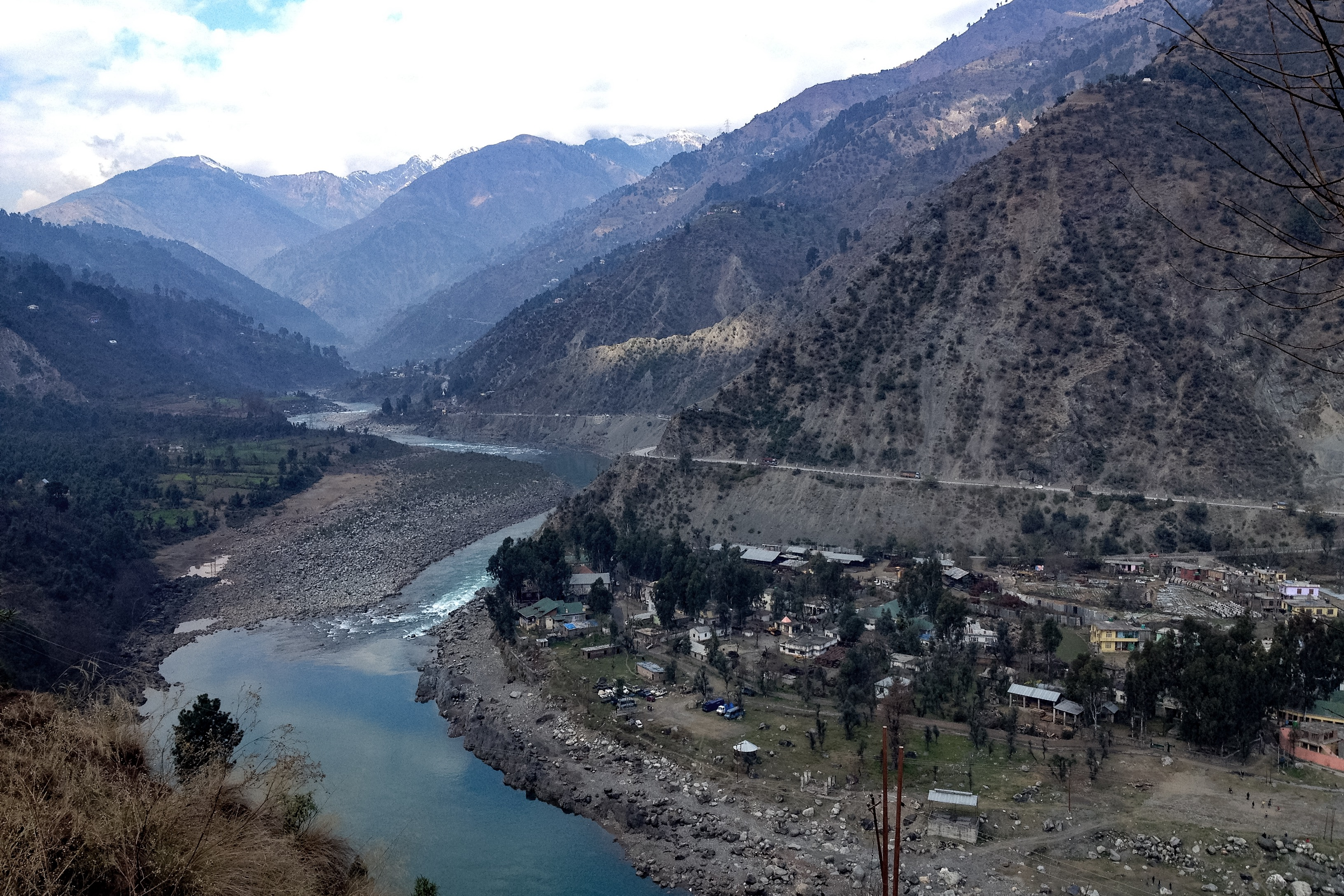
- The Chenab river at Ramban, Jammu and Kashmir, India

Location
- Country: India, Pakistan
- Flows through (areas in India): Himachal Pradesh, Jammu and Kashmir
- Flows through (areas in Pakistan): Punjab

Physical characteristics
- Source: Baralacha La pass
  - location: Lahul and Spiti district, Himachal Pradesh, India
  - coordinates: 32°38′09″N 77°28′51″E
- Mouth: Confluence with Sutlej to form the Panjnad River
  - location: Bahawalpur district, Punjab, Pakistan
  - coordinates: 29°20′57″N 71°1′41″E
- Length: 974 km (605 mi)
- Discharge
  - location: Marala Headworks, Gujrat district, Punjab, Pakistan
  - average: 977.3 m^{3}/s (34,510 cu ft/s)
  - minimum: 310.53 m^{3}/s (10,966 cu ft/s)
  - maximum: 31,148.53 m^{3}/s (1,100,000 cu ft/s)

Basin features
- River system: Indus River
- Tributaries
  - left: Tawi River, Ravi River, Kalnai River and Neeru river
  - right: Marusudar River, Jhelum River, Ansi river and Manawar Tawi river

The Chenab River (Note: /tʃɪˈnæb/; Urdu pronunciation: [ˈt͡ʃɪ.nɑːb]; Punjabi pronunciation: [ˈt͡ʃə˨.nä̃ː˦]); Saraiki pronunciation: [ˈt͡ʃə.nʱɑ̃ː]) is a major river in India and Pakistan, and one of the five major rivers associated with the Punjab region. It is formed by the union of two headwaters, the Chandra and Bhaga, which rise in the upper Himalayas in the Lahaul region of Himachal Pradesh, India. The Chenab then flows through the Jammu region of Jammu and Kashmir, India, into the plains of Punjab, Pakistan, where it joins the Sutlej River to form the Panjnad, which ultimately flows into the Indus River at Mithankot.

The waters of the Chenab were allocated to Pakistan under the terms of the Indus Waters Treaty. India is allowed non-consumptive uses such as power generation. The Chenab River is extensively used in Pakistan for irrigation. Its waters are also transferred to the channel of the Ravi River via numerous link canals.

== Name ==
The Chenab river was called Asikni (Sanskrit: असिक्नी) in the Rigveda (VIII.20.25, X.75.5). The name meant that it was seen to have dark-coloured waters. The term Krishana is also found in the Atharvaveda. A later form of Askikni was Iskamati (Sanskrit: इस्कामति) and the Greek form was Ancient Greek: Ἀκεσίνης – Akesínes; Latinized to Acesines.

In the Mahabharata, the common name of the river was Chandrabhaga (Sanskrit: चन्द्रभागा) because the river is formed from the confluence of the Chandra and the Bhaga rivers. This name was also known to the Ancient Greeks, who Hellenised it in various forms such as Sandrophagos, Sandabaga and Cantabra.

The simplification of Chandrabhaga to 'Chenab', with evident Persianate influence, probably occurred in early medieval times and is witnessed in Alberuni.

== Course ==
=== Present course ===
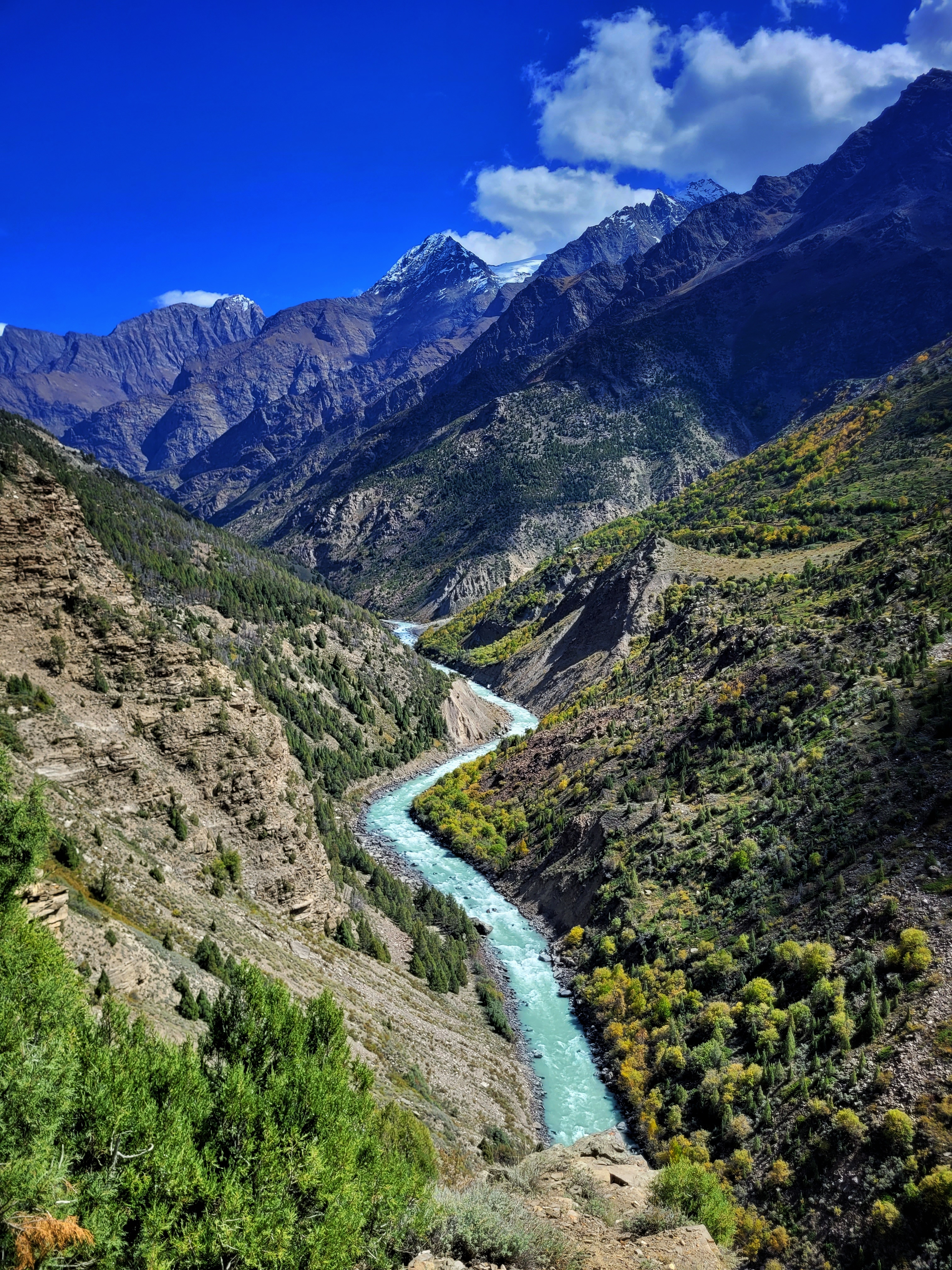
Bhaga River in Keylong, Lahaul, Himachal Pradesh

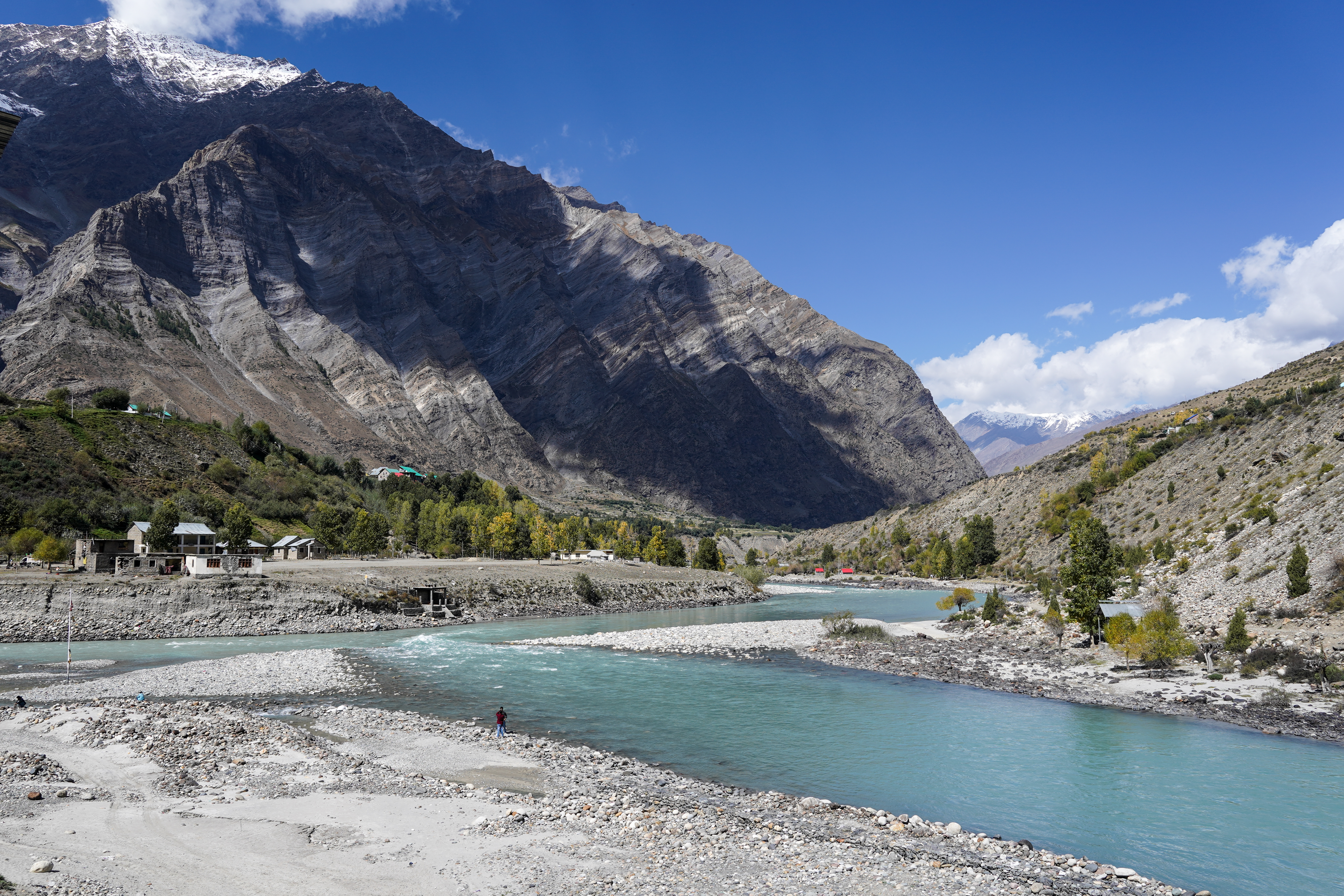
Confluence of the Chandra (left) and Bhaga (right), the two main headstreams of the Chenab, at Tandi, Himachal Pradesh, India.

The river is formed by the confluence of two rivers, Chandra and Bhaga, at Tandi, 8 km (5.0 mi) southwest of Keylong, in the Lahaul and Spiti district of the Indian state of Himachal Pradesh.

The Bhaga River originates from Surya taal lake, which is situated a few kilometers west of the Bara-lacha la pass in Himachal Pradesh. The Chandra River originates from glaciers east of the same pass (near Chandra Taal). This pass also acts as a water-divide between these two rivers. The Chandra river transverses 115 km (71 mi) while the Bhaga river transverses 60 km (37 mi) through narrow gorges before their confluence at Tandi.

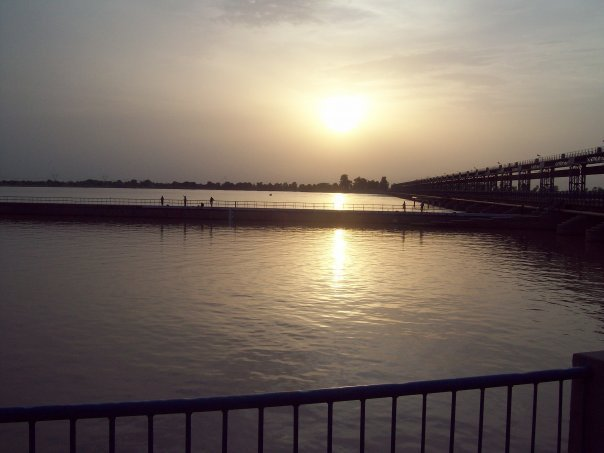
Trimmu Barrage, where Jhelum River flows into the Chenab, in Jhang, Punjab, Pakistan

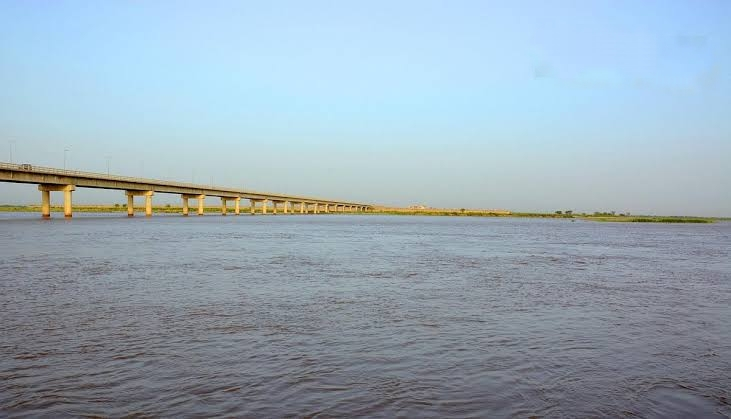
Chenab River's bank at Multan, Punjab, Pakistan

The Chandra-Bhaga then flows through the pangi valley of Chamba district in Himachal Pradesh before entering the Jammu division of Jammu and Kashmir and both rivers meet at sansari nallah located at the last zone of paddar region of Jammu division, where it flows through the Kishtwar, Doda, Ramban, Reasi and Jammu districts. It enters Pakistan and flows through the Punjab province before emptying into the Sutlej, forming the Panjnad River.

=== Historical course ===
Historically, the Chenab River used to flow east of Multan prior to 1245, after which the Beas River occupied its old bed that went by Dipalpur. The Jhelum, Chenab, and Ravi rivers met in the northeastern direction of Multan, then flowing east together until they met the Beas River near Uchh in the southern direction of Multan. However, by 1397 the flow of the Chenab River shifted so that it flows west of Multan.

== History ==
The river was known to Indians in the Vedic period. In 325 BCE, Alexander the Great allegedly founded the town of Alexandria on the Indus (present-day Uch Sharif or Mithankot or Chacharan in Pakistan) at the confluence of the Indus and the combined streams of Punjab rivers (currently known as the Panjnad River). Arrian, in the Anabasis of Alexander, quotes the eyewitness Ptolemy Lagides as writing that the river was 2 miles (3.2 km) wide where Alexander crossed it.

The Battle of Chenab was fought between Sikhs and Afghans on the bank of the river.

== Dams ==
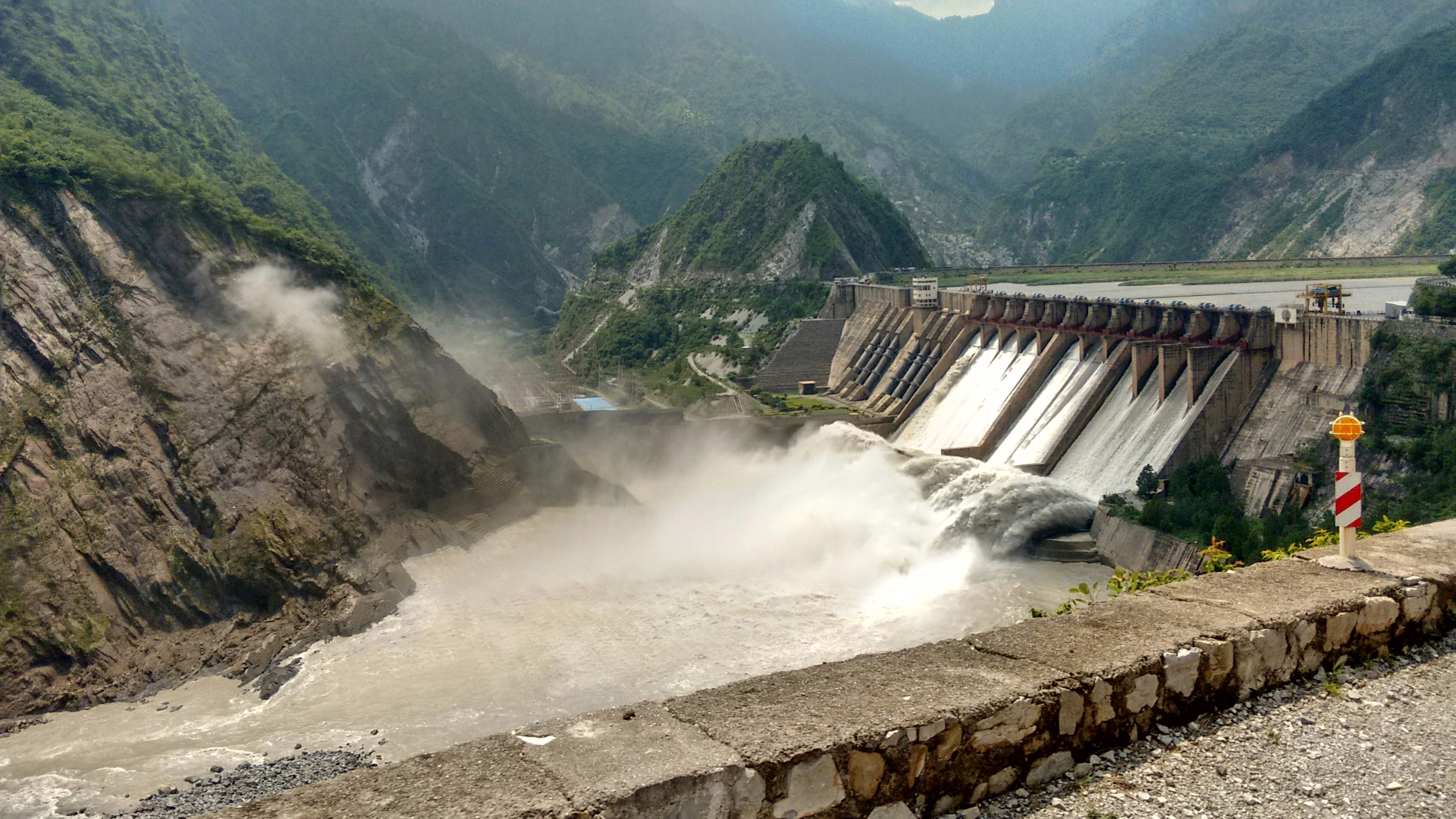
The Salal Dam near Reasi, Jammu and Kashmir in India.

The river has rich power generation potential in India. There are many dams built, under construction or proposed to be built on the Chenab for the purpose of hydroelectric power generation in the country, including:

- Baglihar Hydroelectric power project (900 MW) near Ramban
- Salal Dam – 690 MW hydroelectric power project near Reasi
- Dul Hasti Hydroelectric Plant – 390 MW type power project in Kishtwar District
- Ratle Hydroelectric Plant – an under-construction power station near Drabshalla in Kishtwar District
- Pakal Dul Dam – a proposed dam on a tributary Marusadar River in Kishtwar District
- Kiru Hydroelectric Project (624 MW proposed) located in Kishtwar district
- Kwar Hydroelectric Project (540 MW proposed) located in Kishtwar district

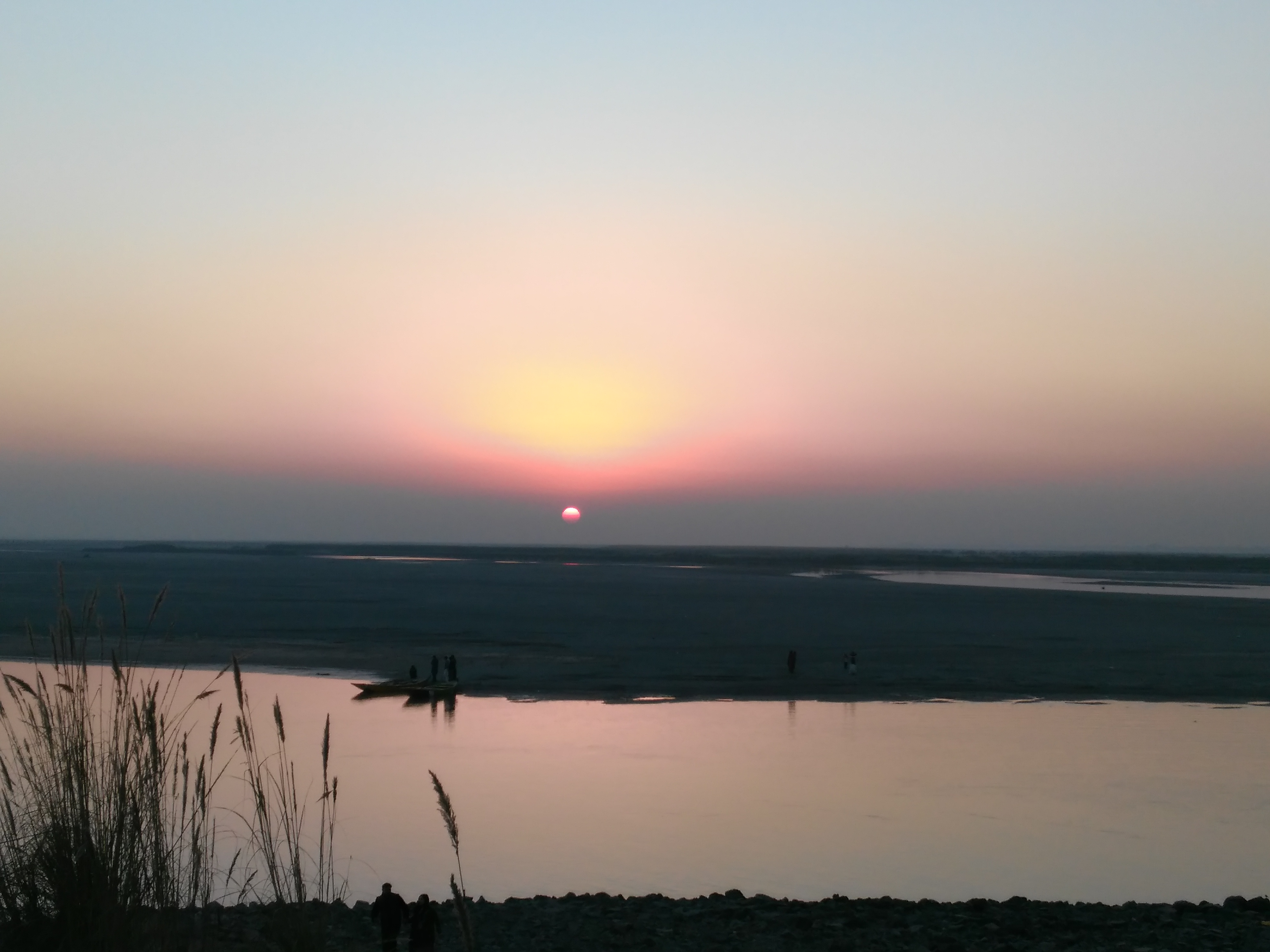
The Chenab river at the Marala Headworks.

All of these are "run-of-the-river" projects as per the Indus Waters Treaty of 1960. The Treaty allocates the waters of Chenab to Pakistan. India can use its water for domestic and agricultural uses or for "non-consumptive" uses such as hydropower. India is entitled to store up to 1.2 million acre-feet (1.5 billion cubic metres) of water in its projects. The three projects completed as of 2011, Salal, Baglihar and Dul Hasti, have a combined storage capacity of 260 thousand acre-feet (320 million cubic metres).

Pakistan has four headworks on the Chenab:

- Marala Headworks – located near Sialkot and Gujrat District
- Khanki Headworks – located in Gujranwala District
- Qadirabad Headworks – located in Mandi Bahauddin District
- Trimmu Barrage – located in Jhang District

== See also ==
- Rivers of Jammu and Kashmir
- Kalnai River
- Beas River
- Indus River
- Jhelum River
- Ravi River
- Satluj River

== Bibliography ==
- Kaul, P. K. (2001). Antiquities of the Chenāb Valley in Jammu: Inscriptions-copper Plates, Sanads, Grants, Firmāns & Letters in Brāhmi-Shārdā-Tākri-Persian & Devnāgri Scripts. Eastern Book Linkers. ISBN 9788178540061.
