= Kishtwar district =

District of Jammu and Kashmir, India

- District of Jammu and Kashmir administered by India
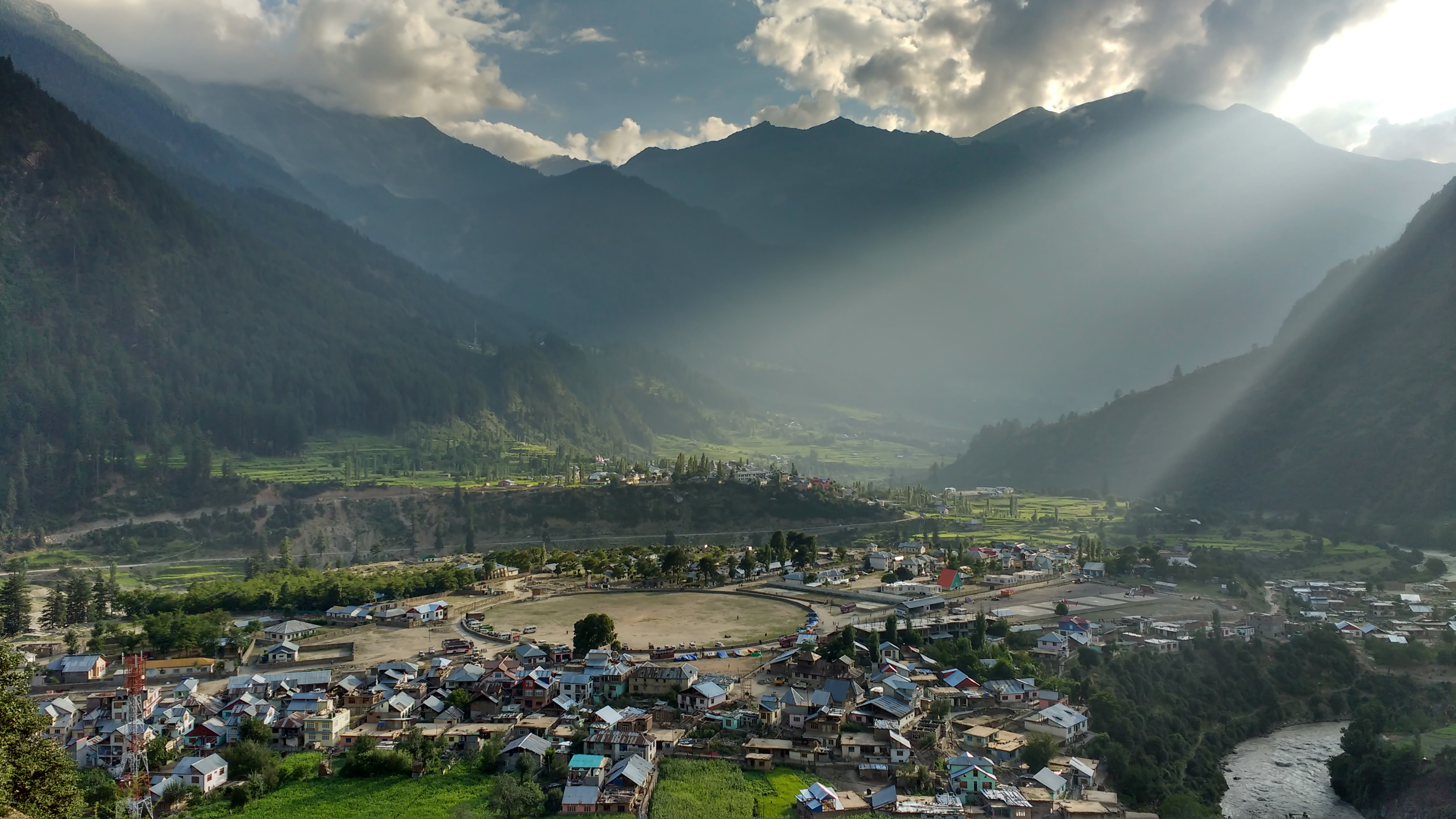
- View of Paddar in Kishtwar

- Interactive map of Kishtwar district
- Coordinates (Kishtwar): 33°34′N 75°53′E
- Administering country: India
- Union territory: Jammu and Kashmir
- Division: Jammu
- Parliamentary Constituency: Udhampur
- Headquarters: Kishtwar
- Tehsils: 1. Kishtwar 2. Chatroo 3. Marwah 4. Paddar 5. Warwan 6. Nagseni 7. Drabshalla 8. Bunjwah 9. Mughal Maidan 10. Dachhan 11. Machail

Government
  - Lok Sabha Constituency: Udhampur
  - MP: Dr. Jitendra Singh, BJP
  - Vidhan Sabha constituencies: 3 constituencies
  - District Magistrate: Rajesh Kumar Shavan

Area
  - Total: 7,737 km^{2} (2,987 sq mi)

Population (2011)
  - Total: 230,696
  - Density: 29.82/km^{2} (77.23/sq mi)

Demographics
  - Literacy: 56.2%
  - Sex ratio: 920 ♀/ 1000 ♂

Languages
  - Official: Dogri, Kashmiri, Urdu, Hindi, English
  - Spoken: Kashmiri, Kishtwari, Gujari, Padri
- Time zone: UTC+05:30 (IST)
- Vehicle registration: JK-17
- Major highways: NH 244
- Website: kishtwar.nic.in

Kishtwar district is an administrative district of the Jammu division in the Indian State of Jammu and Kashmir in the disputed Kashmir region. As of 2011, it is the largest and the least populous district of the Union Territory of Jammu and Kashmir. The district headquarters is Kishtwar.

== History ==
Kishtwar is first referred to in the Rajatarangini by the ancient name Kashthavata during the reign of Raja Kalsa of Kashmir (1063–1089), when "Uttamaraja", the ruler of Kashthavata visited the court of the Kashmir King in company with several other hill chiefs to pay their respects to the Raja. This place, as said by people, is also mentioned in the epic Mahabharata.

Kishtwar became part of the Jammu Dogra state of Raja Gulab Singh, when he annexed it in 1821.

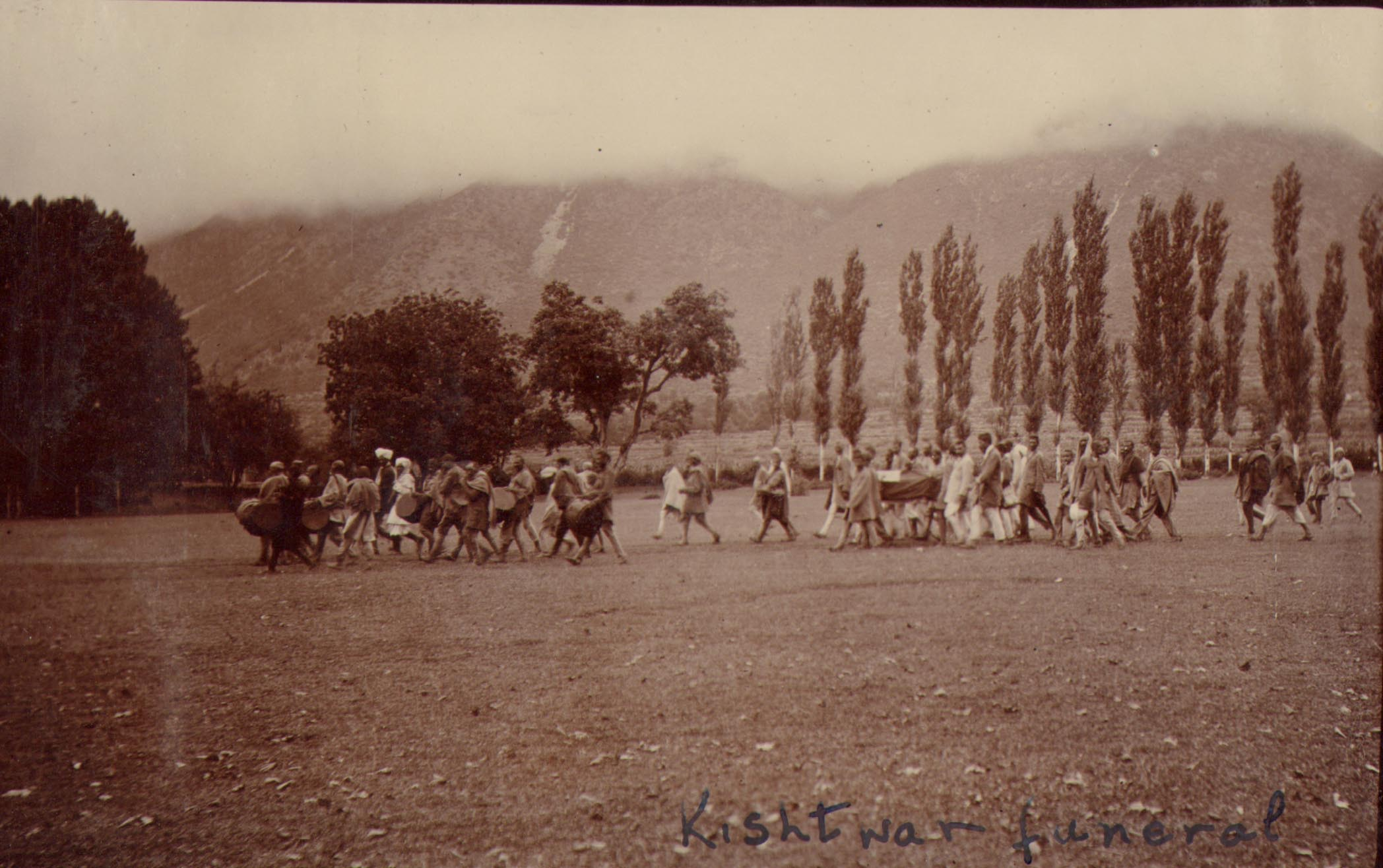
Funeral procession: Kishtwar locals honor departed with drum beats. Photographed by Ralph Randles Stewart in 1913

The local ruler of this place, Mohammed Tegh Singh, was sent to prison in Lahore jail, where he killed himself. The Dogra state eventually became the princely state of Jammu and Kashmir. With the passage of time, Kishtwar became a Tehsil of the Udhampur district and remained so until 1948, when it became part of the newly created District Doda in the wake of first re-organization of the state during the post-independence period. In 2008 it became a newly district as a part of Jammu Division. Now District Kishtwar has become the largest district in term of area in union territory of Jammu & Kashmir with least population.

=== Old inhabitants ===
In the past, Kishtwar was largely inhabited by Kishtwari people before people started settling here from Kashmir and other adjoining areas. The reasons for Kashmiri people settling here in the past in 17th and 18th century is matter of ambiguity between historians. However, Sumantra Bose says it was repression by feudal class that drew people to the district of Doda, Ramban and Kishtwar.

== Demographics ==
=== Population ===
Historical populations
Year	Pop.	±%
1901	42,124	—
1911	45,534	+8.1%
1921	45,929	+0.9%
1931	52,211	+13.7%
1941	56,066	+7.4%
1951	65,330	+16.5%
1961	74,594	+14.2%
1971	97,843	+31.2%
1981	118,661	+21.3%
1991	151,247	+27.5%
2001	190,843	+26.2%
2011	230,696	+20.9%
source: † 1951 and 1991 populations are estimated

According to the 2011 census Kishtwar district has a population of 230,696. This gives it a ranking of 586th in India (out of a total of 640). The district has a population density of 29 inhabitants per square kilometre (75/sq mi) . Its population growth rate over the decade 2001-2011 was 21.06%.

=== Social groups ===
The demography of Kishtwar district is complex and highly diverse compared to neighboring districts. Based on the 2011 census linguistic and demographic data, Kashmiris form the largest group in the district, accounting for over half of the population (50.6%). They are followed by the native Kishtwari-speaking population (16.7%) and the Gujjars (15.2%), who are predominantly a recognized Scheduled Tribe.

Together, the Kashmiri and Kishtwari populations make up a combined majority of 67.3% of the district's total population. Other notable communities in the district include the Padari, Bhadarwahi, and Dogra populations.

=== Language ===
Languages of Kishtwar district (2011)
1. Kashmiri (50.6%)
2. Kishtwari (16.6%)
3. Gujari (Gojri) (15.2%)
4. Padari (7.44%)
5. Bhadarwahi (4.03%)
6. Siraji (1.25%)
7. Bodhi (0.94%)
8. Dogri (0.52%)
9. Pahadi (0.44%)
10. others (3.03%)

According to the 2011 Census, Kashmiri is the most widely spoken language in the district, representing 50.6% of the population, while its sister Dardic language Kishtwari is spoken by an additional 16.7%. Gujari (Gojri) is spoken by 15.2%, mainly by the Muslim Gurjars. Other spoken languages include Padari (7.4%), Bhadarwahi (4.0%), Dogri (2.7%), Siraji (1.2%), Bodhi (0.9%), Urdu, and Hindi.

=== Religion ===
Religion in Kishtwar district (2011)
Religion	Percent
Islam	57.75%
Hinduism	40.72%
Buddhism	0.91%
Other or not stated	0.62%

Muslims are in majority with nearly 58%. Hindus are 41%. There is a small percentage of Buddhists in the far-eastern areas of the district who are the Ladakhis.

Tehsil	Muslim	Hindu	Buddhist	Others
Marwah	79.07	20.76	0.01	0.16
Chhatroo	66.26	32.42	0	0.32
Kishtwar	57.47	41.88	0.04	0.61
Paddar	6.84	83.63	9.46	0.07

=== Sex ratio & literacy rate ===
Kishtwar has a sex ratio of 938 females for every 1000 males, and a literacy rate of 58.54% (Male 71.75%, Female 44.13%). 6.44% of the population lives in urban areas. The Scheduled Castes and Scheduled Tribes account for 6.20% and 16.54% of the population of the district.

Kishtwar district: religion, gender ratio, and % urban of population, according to the 2011 Census.
	Hindu	Muslim	Christian	Sikh	Buddhist	Jain	Other	Not stated	Total
Total	93,931	133,225	277	450	2,094	3	514	202	230,696
Total	40.72%	57.75%	0.12%	0.20%	0.91%	0.00%	0.22%	0.09%	100.00%
Male	49,604	68,655	164	296	1,056	0	273	117	120,165
Female	44,327	64,570	113	154	1,038	3	241	85	110,531
Gender ratio (% female)	47.2%	48.5%	40.8%	34.2%	49.6%	100.0%	46.9%	42.1%	47.9%
Sex ratio (no. of females per 1,000 males)	894	940	–	–	983	–	883	–	920
Urban	4,398	10,288	34	97	24	0	0	24	14,865
Rural	89,533	122,937	243	353	2,070	3	514	178	215,831
% Urban	4.7%	7.7%	12.3%	21.6%	1.1%	0.0%	0.0%	11.9%	6.4%

== Geography ==
Kishtwar district has a total area of 7,737 square kilometres (2,987 sq mi). The district is bordered by Kargil district in the east and north, Chamba district to the south, and Anantnag and Doda districts to the west. The Chenab river flows through the district,The Marusudar river, a tributary of Chenab, also flows through the district.

== Administration ==
Kishtwar district consists of 4 Sub-Divisions, 11 tehsils, and 13 blocks.

Following are the blocks: Marwah, Warwan, Dachhan, Kishtwar, Nagseni, Drabshalla, Inderwal, Mughal Maidan, Bunjwah, Machail, Palmar, Thakrie Trigham, and Paddar.

Each block consists of several panchayats. Block Kishtwar is the 1st block of Kishtwar District and Bairoon Town 1st Kishtwar is the 1st panchayat of Block Kishtwar, Bairoon town panchayat consists of Panditgam, Zewar, Nagdera, Bucherwal Mohalla, Semmna and Wazgwari. Marwah consists of 12 panchayats 1. Nowpachi, 2.Nowgam, 3.Yourdu, 4. Pethgam, 5.Ranie A, 6. Ranie B, 7. Quderna A, 8 Quderna B, 9 Chanjer, 10. Dehrana, 11. Hanzal, 12.Teller.

Following are the sub-divisions and tehsils:

Kishtwar Sub-district:

- Kishtwar tehsil
- Drabshalla tehsil
- Bunjwah tehsil
- Nagseni Tehsil

Chhatroo Sub-district:

- Chhatroo tehsil
- Mughal Maidan Tehsil

Marwah Sub-district:

- Warwan tehsil
- Dachhan tehsil
- Marwah Tehsil

Atholi (Paddar) Sub-district:

- Paddar tehsil is the most remote tehsil of the district, towered by the Sickle Moon Peak.
- Machail

== Politics ==
Kishtwar District has 3 assembly constituencies: Padder-Nagseni, Inderwal and Kishtwar. All except Inderwal were won by the BJP. Inderwal was won by independent Pyare Lal Sharma. It is the part of the Udhampur (Lok Sabha constituency).

== Economy ==
Sex Ratio in Kishtwar District in 2011 Census. (no. females per 1,000 males)
Religion (and population)	Sex Ratio
Muslim (pop 133,225)	940
Hindu (pop 93,931)	894
Other (pop 1,446)	701
Total (pop 230,696)	920

The economy of the area is not regularized with no visible investment from the government. The area is rural in nature has an agricultural-based economy. Due to the dry nature of the climate, the village peasant population usually grows wheat and barley in Rabi (winter) season and Rajma (kidney bean) and maize in Kharif (rainy) season. Kishtwar has the distinction of producing world-class blue Diamond Sapphire which was mined at Padder valley. The area is although rich in natural mineral resources but poor infrastructure has posed difficulty in its extraction. Mineral gypsum is mined at Village Trigam. The river sand of Chenab is of the best quality and used extensively for construction purposes.

The Padder area produces world-class Pine nuts called chilgoza which is a delicacy and costly dry fruit. In Marwah, Chhatroo, Mughalmaidan and Bounjwah tehsils, walnut production of best quality walnuts in thousands of tons is recorded, but due to the absence of any fruit Mandi, exact figures are not available. Besides walnut, Marwah tehsil produces thousands of tons of Rajma (kidney beans) which is the cash crop of the area. Villages of Pochhal, Matta and Hidyal produce saffron which is the highest quality in the world. Rural households are also abundantly gifted by nature through cash crops of edible mushrooms and morchella called guchhi in the local language. Some families have been reported to earn more than Rs. 100,000 per year by just selling the dried Morchella in local markets. Edible ferns are also a natural cash crop of the area. Apples are produced in some areas.

The rivers are a rich source of hydroelectricity and the site of the hydroelectric power projects of Dul Hasti 390 MW, Ratle Hydroelectric Project 850 MW, Kirthai 1400 MW, Pakal Dool 1,000 MW, Lower Kalnai 48 MW and Chaudhary 15MW, Keeru HEPP and Kwar HEPP with the highest per capita wattage production in the world for such a small area. These projects have been the largest source of employment in the area and have immensely contributed to the prosperity of the area.

== Tourism ==
The Chenab River flows through the district and is joined by tributaries such as the Marvisudar river of Marwah, Fambar

Nallah, Chingam Nallah which meet at the confluence near Bhandarkoot. The rivers have cut steep gorges and wide plains on the way. Warwan and Marwah valleys are unique in being located in the way of river Marusudar. The area is also known for its high mountain passes which have been the mountaineer's delight since the British era. Many illustrations are found in the travelogue written by British writers including Otto Rothfield's With pen and Rifle in Kashmir.

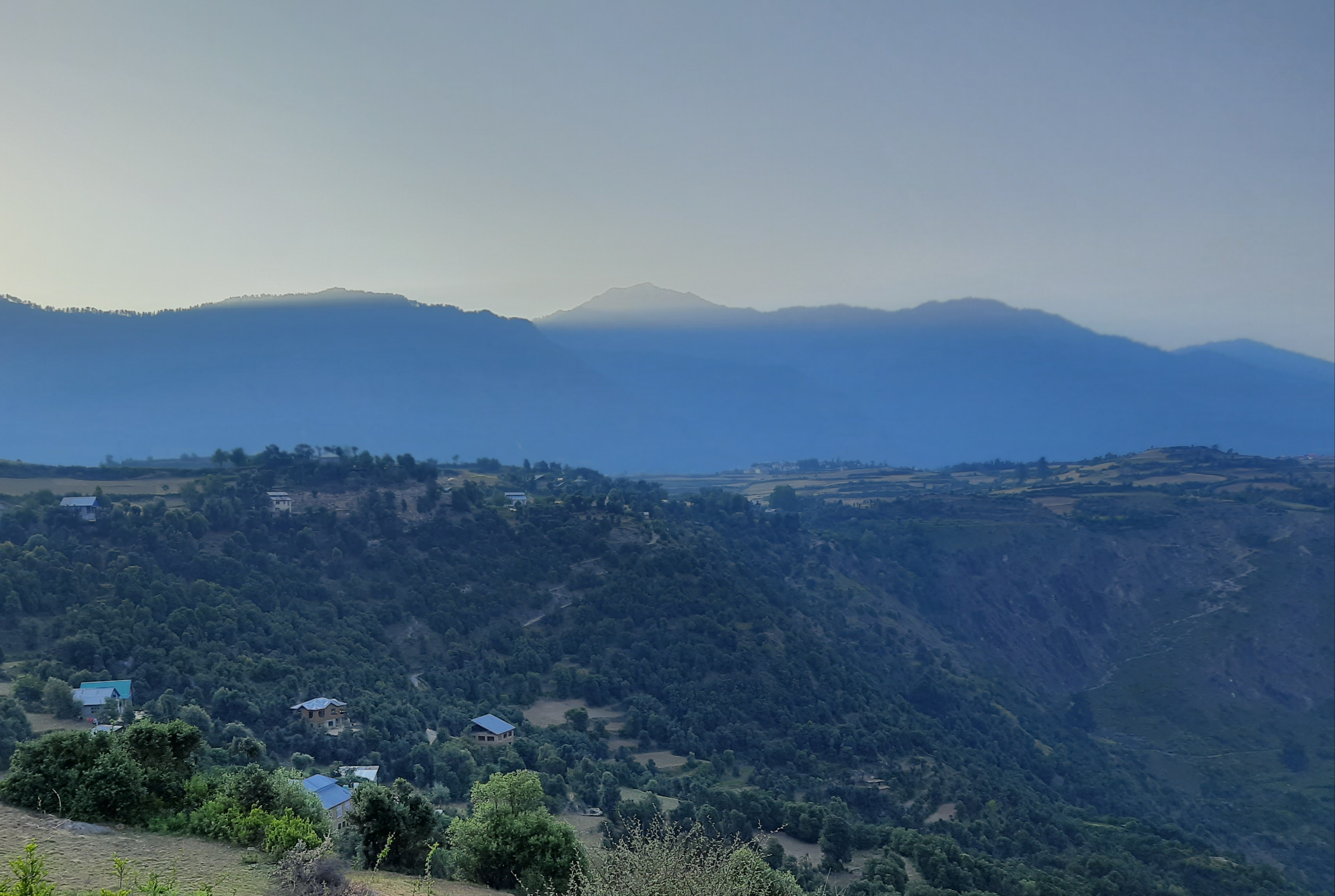
View from Aarse (Pochal, Kishtwar)

The Kishtwar–Anantnag National Highway passes through the Sinthan Pass and Daksum Nowpachi Road passes through the Margan top a 13 km long and 5100-metre-high pass. The Steep Brahma mountain peak is situated at Dachhan which is documented by British mountaineers. The Warwan Valley has been rated among India's top ten trekking destinations with a wide range of landscapes. Saffron of purest quality is produced in the iron-rich soil at Pochhal, Matta, Lachdayaram and Hidyal. Kishtwar National Park, in the northeast region of the district, has a large number of peaks and glaciers. The town has a small airstrip under the control and management of the Indian Army which caters to civil and military Helicopters. The 33-hectare Chowgan is the largest natural ground located in the centre of the city and is used as a venue for recreation and religious and political gatherings. Mini Secretariat housing all the offices of Kishtwar district administration is located 3 km from the main bus stand in Kuleed area. Kishtwar is endowed with dense forests of deodar, pine and fir. High altitude mountains are ranging between 20,000 feet to 21,000 feet like Nun Kun, Barhma. there are many peaks in Paddar like Cerro Kishtwar, Tipendai, Gupta Peak, Shivling Peak, Aushuko Peak, Omasla Peak etc.

There are many trekking routes in Paddar like Omasla trek, Kabbanla trek, Potla trek, Ashuko trek, Tundupla trek, Sarsangla trek, Mounla trek and many sights like Darllang Nalla, Bujas Nalla, Barnaj Nalla, Chandi Mata Mandir, Lossani Gompa, Naag Stone at Darlang Nalla.

== Transportation ==
=== Air ===
Kishtwar Airport is a proposed airport in the district headquarters. The nearest airports to Kishtwar are Jammu airport which is 211 km away from Kishtwar and Sheikh ul Alam International Airport Srinagar which is 208 km away from the district .

=== Rail ===
There is no railway connectivity to Kishtwar yet. The Udhampur–Doda–Kishtwar is a planned railway line for Doda and Kishtwar districts. The nearest major railway station is Udhampur railway station which is located 150 kilometres from district headquarters Kishtwar.

=== Road ===
Kishtwar district is well-connected to the winter capital Jammu and summer capital Srinagar by the NH 244 alongside other intra-district roads. The road to Srinagar passes through the picturesque Sinthan pass.

== Notables ==
- Sheetal Devi is an Indian Para-archer. Devi was born with a rare medical condition called phocomelia, which makes her the first and the only international para-archery champion without upper limbs. She received an Arjuna Award from the President of India on 9 January 2024.
- Om Mehta, politician
- Sajjad Ahmad Kichloo, politician
- G. M. Saroori, politician
- Mehta Basti Ram , Dogra officer and commander of the Fateh Shibji battalion under Raja Gulab Singh of Jammu (later Maharaja of Jammu and Kashmir)
- Shagun Parihar is an Indian politician from Jammu & Kashmir. She is a Member of the Jammu & Kashmir Legislative Assembly from 2024, representing Kishtwar Assembly constituency as a Member of the Bharatiya Janta Party. At the age of 29 years, She is the youngest winner in the 2024 Jammu and Kashmir Legislative Assembly election.
- Sunil Kumar Sharma is an Indian politician from Kishtwar area of Jammu and Kashmir who is currently serving as the Leader of Opposition in the Jammu and Kashmir Legislative Assembly. He is the member of the Bharatiya Janata Party
- Krishna Mehta (4 June 1913 – 20 October 1993) was an Indian politician, social worker, and the first woman member of parliament from Jammu and Kashmir.

== See also ==
- Jammu
- Pir Panjal
- Sinthan Top
