= Kishtwari language =

Northern Indo-Aryan language

Kishtwari
- کشتواڑی; किश्तवाड़ी
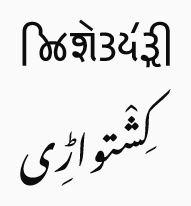
- Native to: Jammu and Kashmir
- Ethnicity: Kishtwaris
- Native speakers: 40,000 (2011 census)
- Language family: Indo-European: Indo-Iranian; Indo-Aryan; Eastern Dardic; Kashmiri; Kishtwari

Language codes
- ISO 639-3: –
- Glottolog: kish1245

Kishtwari or Kashtwari is an Indo-Aryan language of the Dardic branch. It is closely related to Kashmiri language, with strong influences from neighbouring Western Pahari varieties. It is spoken by the Kishtwaris in Kishtwar district of Jammu division in Jammu and Kashmir, India.

== Origin ==
Kishtwari originated from Prakrit – the spoken language of common people in ancient times. The literary language was Sanskrit which has a close relationship with Prakrit. It can be conveniently called a sister language of the Kashmiri language, as both have originated from Prakrit which is much simpler than Sanskrit.

Kishtwari has been preserved from the admixture of words and phrases from other languages and dialects. However, the original Prakrit spoken by common man of Kishtwar in olden times has absorbed some words from Dogri, Punjabi, and Persian languages to a limited extent. The present form of Kishtwari is directly descended from Prakrit, Pali or Sanskrit.

== Classification ==
Grierson, in his Linguistic Survey of India, classified Kishtwari as a highly divergent variety of Kashmiri that had been profoundly influenced by neighbouring Punjabi and Western Pahari languages. Grierson noted that Kishtwari is more conservative in certain aspects than other Kashmiri dialects, as evidenced by the retention of subject pronoun thu, in addition to the present participle an, features that have disappeared in Standard Kashmiri. A wordlist and preliminary grammatical sketch of Kishtwari were compiled in The Languages of the Northern Himalayas.

Kishtwari has historically been classified as a dialect of Kashmiri by scholars such as George Abraham Grierson, and is partially intelligible with Kashmiri. Linguists like Siddheshwar Varma consider Kishtwari an intermediate between Western Pahari languages and Kashmiri. If considered a divergent dialect of Kashmiri, Kishtwari is one of two Kashmiri varieties spoken outside of the Kashmir Valley (the other being Poguli, which is even more distinct and not intelligible with either Kashmiri or Kishtwari). Kishtwari is also tonal, like neighbouring languages such as Dogri and Punjabi.

== Number of speakers ==
The 1911 Census of India recorded 7,464 speakers of Kishtwari.

== Script ==
Grierson remarks that an idiosyncratic variant of Takri is used to write the Kishtwari language; as well as observing that there does not appear to be standard spelling nor a consistent orthography.

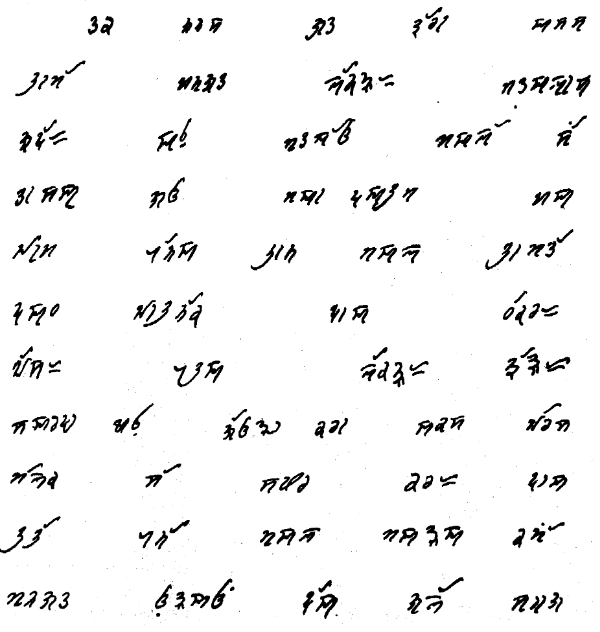
Specimen in Kashtwari language from Grierson's LSI Vol. VIII, Pt. II, page 386
