= List of valleys in India =

The following is a partial list of valleys in India, listed alphabetically. Many of these valleys are named after the river that flows through them.

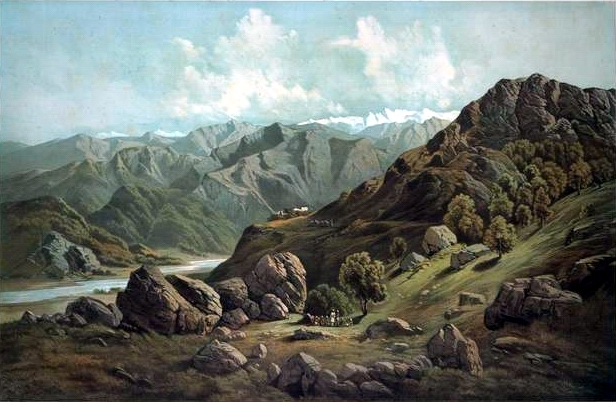
Sutlej Valley from Rampur, ca. 1857.

Name	Location	Image
Araku Valley	Vishakhapatnam	Araku valley
Bangus Valley	Jammu and Kashmir	
Barak Valley	Assam	
Baspa Valley	Himachal Pradesh	
Betaab Valley	Jammu and Kashmir	
Bhakra Nangal Valley	Bilaspur, Himachal Pradesh	
Bhal Padri Valley	Doda, Jammu and Kashmir	Bhal Padri in Bhalessa
Brahmaputra Valley	Assam	
Breng Valley	Jammu and Kashmir	
Chamba Valley	Himachal Pradesh	
Chambal Valley	Madhya Pradesh	
Chenab Valley	Jammu and Kashmir	
Chumbi Valley	Tibet, China, the intersection of India (Sikkim), Bhutan and China (Tibet) in the Himalayas	
Cumbum Valley	Theni District Tamil Nadu in the Western ghats	
Dah Hanu Valley	Ladakh	
Damodar Valley	West Bengal	
Darma Valley	Pithoragarh District, Kumaon, Uttarakhand	
Upper Dibang Valley	Arunachal Pradesh	
Lower Dibang Valley	Arunachal Pradesh	
Dihing Valley	Arunachal Pradesh	
Doon Valley	Lower Himalayas, Uttarakhand and Himachal Pradesh	
Dzüko Valley	Nagaland	
Godavari Valley	Maharashtra, Telangana and Andhra Pradesh	
Gurais Valley	Jammu and Kashmir	
Gurez Valley	Kashmir	
Gwass-Bagi Valley,	Himachal Pradesh	
Habban Valley	Himachal Pradesh	
Imphal Valley	Manipur	
Jai Valley	Jammu and Kashmir	
Joginder Nagar Valley	Himachal Pradesh	Joginder Nagar Valley
Johar Valley, Kumaon,	Uttarakhand	
Kabaw Valley	Manipur, India and Sagaing region, Myanmar	
Kambam Valley	Tamil Nadu	
Kangra Valley	Himachal Pradesh	Kangra Valley
Kashmir Valley	Jammu and Kashmir	
Kaveri Valley	Karnataka and Tamil Nadu	
Ketti Valley	Ooty, Tamil Nadu	
Kharahal Valley	Himachal Pradesh	
Krishna Valley	Maharashtra, Karnataka, Telangana and Andhra Pradesh	
Kullu Valley	Himachal Pradesh	
Kunihar Valley	Himachal Pradesh	
Kuthi Valley, Kumaon,	Uttarakhand	
Lahaul Valley	Himachal Pradesh	
Lidder Valley	Jammu and Kashmir	
Lolab Valley	Jammu and Kashmir	
Lug Valley	Himachal Pradesh	
Mahanadi Valley	Odisha and Chhattisgarh	
Mandakini Valley	Kedarnath, Uttarakhand	
Markha Valley	Ladakh, Jammu and Kashmir	
Mushkoh Valley	Jammu and Kashmir	
Nagarjunasagar	Telangana	
Narmada Valley	Madhya Pradesh	
Nathang Valley	Sikkim	Nathang Valley
Neora Valley	Kalimpong, Darjeeling	
Nubra Valley	Ladakh, Trans Himalaya	
Patratu Valley	Jharkhand	
Pangi Valley	Himachal Pradesh	
Parvati Valley	Kasol, Himachal Pradesh	
Pin Valley	Himachal Pradesh	
Pindar Valley, Kumaon,	Uttarakhand	
Sangla Valley	Kinnaur District, Himachal Pradesh	
Sandhan Valley	Ahmednagar District, Maharashtra	
Sangti Valley	Arunachal Pradesh	
Satluj Valley	Kinnaur District, Himachal Pradesh	
Saur Valley	Pithoragarh District, Kumaon, Uttarakhand	
Sham Valley	Ladakh	
Shiladesh	Himachal Pradesh	
Silent Valley National Park	Palakkad District, Kerala	
Sind Valley	Jammu and Kashmir	
Solang Valley	Himachal Pradesh	
Spiti Valley	Himachal Pradesh (India) and Tibet (China)	
Suru Valley	Ladakh region, Jammu and Kashmir	
Tlawng Valley	Mizoram	
Tons Valley	Uttarkashi, Uttarakhand	
Tosa Maidan	Jammu and Kashmir	
Valley of Flowers	West Himalayas, Uttarakhand	
Visalakshi Nagar	Visakhapatnam, Andhra Pradesh	
Yumthang Valley	Sikkim	Yumthang Valley
Zanskar Valley	Ladakh, Jammu and Kashmir	
Zoji La Valley	Jammu and Kashmir	
