= Joura, Jammu and Kashmir =

Village in Jammu and Kashmir

Joura Joura Khurd, Joura Kalan
- Village
- Joura in Jammu and Kashmir, India
- Coordinates: 33.089715°N 75.796233°E
- Country: India
- Union Territory: Jammu and Kashmir
- District: Doda

Area
  - Total: 8 km^{2} (3.1 sq mi)
- Demonym(s): Kashmiri, Bhalessi, Bhaderwahi, Sarazi, Gojri, Bhalessi

Languages
  - Official Language: Urdu
  - Spoken: Kashmiri, Gojari, Bhadarwahi, Urdu
- Time zone: UTC+5:30 (IST)
- PIN: 182203

Joura is a village located in the Thatri Block of the Doda district in Jammu and Kashmir. The area is divided into two panchayats called Joura Khurd and Joura Kalan.

The village is one of the preferred routes to the hill station and meadow Jantroon Dhar.

== Location ==
Joura is located about 21 kilometers east of the District Headquarters, Doda, and 10 kilometers from Kahara on the Thathri–Gandoh road, which connects to National Highway 244 at Thathri.
