= Zea Abad (Thathri) =

- Village
- Location in Jammu and Kashmir, India
- Coordinates: 33°08′42″N 75°46′49″E
- Country: India
- Union territory: Jammu and Kashmir
- Region: Jammu region
- District: Doda
- Subdistrict: Thathri
- Demonym(s): Bhaderwahi and Kashmiri

Language
  - Spoken: Kashmiri, Bhaderwahi, Gojri
  - Official: Urdu
- Time zone: UTC+5:30 (IST)
- Postal code: 182203

Zea Abad, (Grid Station Thathri or Madan Chittar) is a village in Thathri sub division of Doda district. It is the part of panchayat Jangalwar located on the Batote-Kishtwar National Highway.

== Location ==
Zea Abad is located on Batote-Kishtwar National Highway bordering Thathri town on its east.

== History ==
Zea Abad was part of Thathri until that town became a town in 2011. This village had paddy fields in the past that belonged to a person with the name Madan; that is why it was known as Madan Khait or Madan Chittar. When an electricity receiving station for Thathri was built here, it became popular with the name "Grid Station Thathri."

== Demographics ==
Zea Abad village is located in Phagsoo tehsil (earlier Thathri). There was only single government school in this village known as Govt Primary School Zea Abad which was closed in 2013.
