= Kahara (disambiguation) =

Kahara is a settlement in Nyeri County, Kenya.

Kahara may also refer to:

- Kahara, Jammu and Kashmir, a village and tehsil in India
- Kaharati, a settlement in Kenya's Central Province
- Tomomi Kahara (born 1974), Japanese pop singer

== See also ==
- Kaharan, Iran
