= Halaran =

- Village and Panchayat
- Location within Jammu and Kashmir Location within India
- Coordinates: 33°06′21″N 75°48′49″E
- Country: India
- Union Territory: Jammu and Kashmir
- Division: Jammu
- Region: Chenab Valley
- District: Doda
- Tehsil: Kahara
- Sub-division: Thathri

Area
  - Total: 0.356 km^{2} (0.137 sq mi)

Population (2011)
  - Total: 194
  - Density: 545/km^{2} (1,410/sq mi)

Languages
  - Spoken: Bhaderwahi, Urdu, Kashmiri
- Postal code: 182203

Halaran is a village and panchayat located in the Kahara tehsil of Doda district in the Indian administered union territory of Jammu and Kashmir. The village is situated approximately 13 kilometers away from the sub-divisional headquarters, Thathri, and 43 kilometers away from the district headquarters, Doda.

== Geography ==
Halaran covers a geographical area of 0.356 square kilometers (35.6 hectares).

== Demographics ==
As of the 2011 Census of India, Halaran has a total population of 194 people, with 97 males and 97 females. The literacy rate of the village is 60.82%, with 71.13% of males and 50.52% of females being literate. The village comprises about 39 households.

== Administration ==
The village is administered by a sarpanch, who is elected as the local representative through village-level elections. Halaran falls under the Bhaderwah assembly constituency and the Udhampur parliamentary constituency. The nearest major economic hub is the town of Thathri, located approximately 13 kilometers away.

== Education ==
The village has seven schools, serving about 700 students.

== See also ==
- Doda district
- Jammu and Kashmir
- Thathri
- Chenab Valley
