= 2023 Thathri land subsidence =

Geological event in Thathri town of Jammu and Kashmir

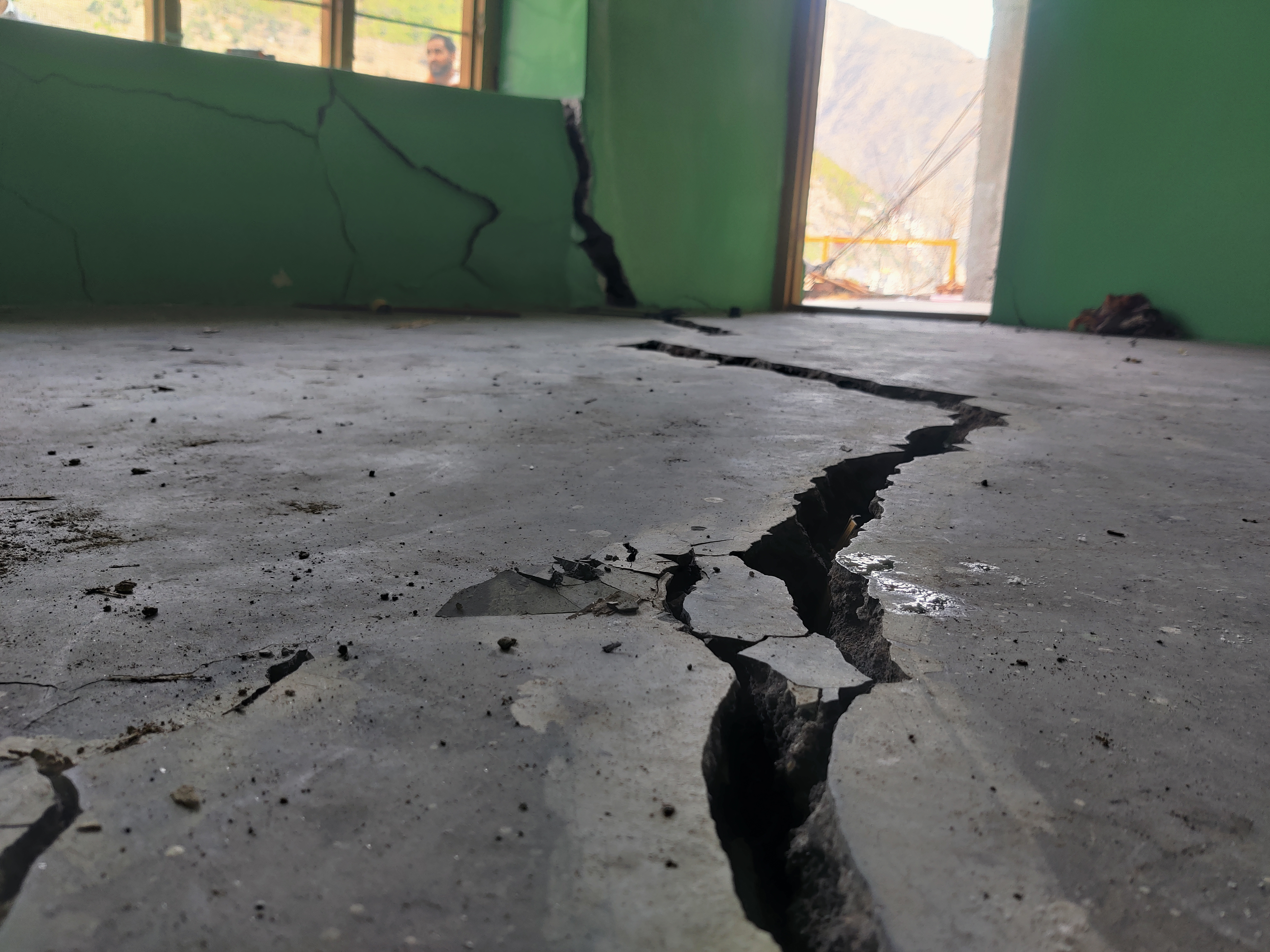
- Cracks in a house in Nayi Basti Thathri, 1 February
- Date: 1 February 2023
- Location: Thathri, Jammu and Kashmir; 33.145477°N 75.784099°E
- Property damage: 23 structures
- Displaced: ~300

On 1 February 2023, a land subsidence event developed in the town of Thathri in the Doda district of Jammu and Kashmir, India, resulting in 23 structures being declared unsafe and approximately 300 people being displaced. The event has been described by geological experts as a multifactor landsliding. Buildings impacted include several houses, a mosque, a religious school for girls, and a cricket academy. As of 9 February 2023, a massive landsliding was reported at Nayi Basti which blocked National Highway 244 for hours. As of 23 March 2023, the incident spot is declared as "not habitable" by Geological Survey of India report.

== Incident ==
In December 2022, residents of the Nayi Basti area of Thathri observed some minor cracks in houses.

In January 2023, Doda district administrators visited the location and reported that the cracks were minor.

On 1 February 2023, The Chenab Times reported that four houses in the area developed cracks, and as of 6 February 2023, 21 houses have been affected.

Residents have reported that about 100 families used to live in the township, most of whom have now been relocated by the district administration to safer locations.

On 9 February 2023, fresh landslides were reported at Nayi Basti Thathri which blocked National Highway 244.

== Reactions and responses ==
The residents of Nayi Basti have demanded that the district administration provide them with alternate lands and relief. On 1 February 2023, The Chenab Times reported that residents of Nayi Basti protested against the local administration for not acting on the issue.

On 3 February 2023, Deputy Commissioner Vishesh Paul Mahajan of Doda reported that the village of Nai Basti experienced significant land subsidence, causing the district government to relocate 19 families to more secure locations. He reported that three houses had already fallen down, and several others had sustained cracks. The district administration also declared a religious school and mosque in the area unsafe.

On 4 February 2023, Lieutenant Governor Manoj Sinha stated that the Jammu and Kashmir administration was closely monitoring approximately twenty structures in Doda that exhibited cracking. However, he denied that the situation is comparable to the land subsidence experienced in Joshimath.

A team of geologists led by G. M. Bhat determined that the Nayi Basti area in Thathri which was assumed to be sinking, is in fact sliding, causing cracks to develop in buildings. Continuous seepage of household water inside the land may be one of the main reasons for subsidence in Nayi Basti, according to Bhat.

As of 23 March 2023, Geological Survey of India (GSI) has recommended that the affected area is not habitable anymore.

On 24 March 2023, the Jammu and Kashmir Government has formed a committee in response to the National Green Tribunal's directives to suggest remedial measures for preventing environmental damage in District Doda. The panel is composed of the Chief Secretary, Jammu and Kashmir, as chairperson, the Principal Secretary to Government, Forest, Ecology, and Environment Department as member convenor, and members from various institutions, including Kumaon University, Wadia Institute of Himalayan Geology, and Central Pollution Control Board. The committee is expected to complete its studies within two months and submit its report to the Tribunal by May 15, 2023. The committee has been given the freedom to take assistance from any other expert/institution and interact with stakeholders.

On 03 June 2023, the Joint Committee, commissioned by the National Green Tribunal (NGT), has proposed the utilization of geospatial mapping techniques to identify Thathri-type foot slope zones throughout Doda district. The committee, led by the Chief Secretary of Jammu and Kashmir, aims to employ advanced technology for effective civil engineering project planning and management in the region, with the primary goal of averting environmental harm by avoiding unsuitable construction areas. Geospatial mapping, as advocated by the committee, involves analyzing data within a geographic context by overlaying various information layers, including land use, population density, and environmental factors. This approach assists urban planners in creating more sustainable cities by facilitating the analysis of population distribution, transportation networks, land use patterns, and environmental influences. The committee's recommendations encompass critical elements such as monitoring, construction prohibitions in affected zones, resident relocation, retention and gabion wall construction, natural diversion restoration, geotechnical assessments, and the establishment of a geo-portal for enhanced planning and monitoring. These measures, when properly executed and continuously monitored, can contribute to risk reduction and enhanced safety. However, it's important to recognize that slope instability is a multifaceted issue influenced by various factors, necessitating ongoing monitoring, reassessment, and adaptive strategies. To ensure safety, close coordination among departments, agencies, and stakeholders is indispensable, allowing for comprehensive and integrated planning that considers all relevant aspects of slope stability.
