= Ranote =

Village in Jammu and Kashmir

- Village
- Ranote in Jammu and Kashmir, India
- Coordinates: 33.129022°N 75.783712°E
- Country: India
- Union territory: Jammu and Kashmir
- Region: Jammu region
- District: Doda
- Demonym: Bhalessi

Language
  - Spoken: Bhadarwahi, Urdu
  - Official: Urdu
- Time zone: UTC+5:30 (IST)
- Postal code: 182203

Ranote is a village in the Thathri tehsil of Doda district in the union territory of Jammu and Kashmir, India.

== About and demographics ==
=== About ===
Ranote village is located 13 kilometres (8.1 mi) from its tehsil headquarter Kahara and 60 kilometres (37 mi) from district headquarter Doda. It is listed in Jia panchayat.

=== Demographics ===
Ranote village is a backward village having population of 600 people. The people generally are very poor and depends upon agricultural activities. The spoken languages of people are Bhaderwahi, Bhalessi, Gojri, Kashmiri and Sarazi.

== Culture ==
There is a festival called Mahal Nag Mela, celebrated annually. Number of pilgrims visit this village for performing this cultural festival.
