= Sinthan Top =

Indian mountain pass

Sinthan Pass
- Sinthan Top
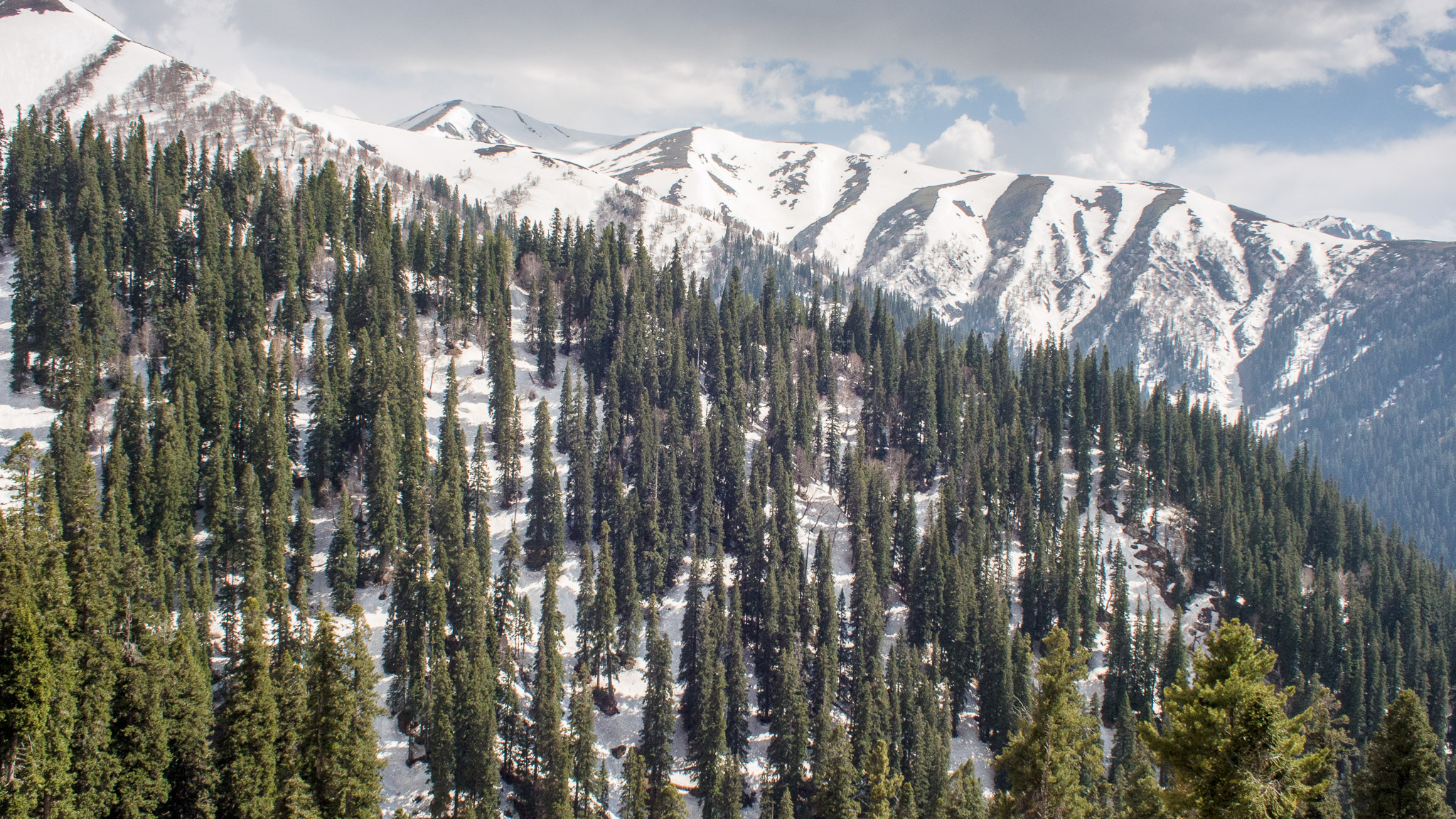
- View of Sinthan Top

- Location within Jammu and Kashmir Location within India
- Elevation: 12,414 feet (3,784 m)
- Traversed by: NH 244

Location
- Location: Anantnag district, Jammu and Kashmir, India
- Range: Pir Panjal
- Coordinates: 33°34′53″N 75°30′39″E

Sinthan Top is a mountain pass, a popular tourist destination located in Kishtwar district and borders with South Kashmir's Breng Valley (Sub-District Kokernag) of Anantnag district in the Indian union territory of Jammu and Kashmir in the disputed Kashmir region. Majority of the area lies on the Kishtwar side. The top acts as a sort of base camp to several alpine lakes in the region.

== Location ==
The Sinthan pass connects Anantnag with Kishtwar and is the only road that connects the people of Warwan and Marwah (Marye) of Kishtwar district with district headquarters in Kishtwar town. It is 12,500 feet (3,800 m) above sea level and is snow-capped for most of the year. It is located on the Anantnag–Kokernag–Kishtwar section of NH 244, and is 80 km from Kishtwar town, 130 km south of Srinagar and 73 km from Anantnag and 48 km from Kokernag. Sinthan Top has no local population. Shepherds from adjoining places like Kokernag, Daksum, and tourists and those working in the tourism industry may stay overnight in tents.

== Tourism ==
Sinthan Top is recognized for its scenic landscape and is increasingly becoming a prominent tourist destination within the Chenab Valley. Located approximately 37 kilometers via a winding, ascending route from Daksum, the area provides opportunities for adventure tourism, including mountaineering, trekking, and skiing. Additionally, the region is seeing a growing emphasis on eco-tourism initiatives aimed at preserving its natural mountain ecosystems and promoting sustainable travel practices.

Sinthan Top is accessible from Srinagar It is 4–5 hours drive by car. Attractions in Kashmir like Kokernag, Dacksum and Achabal fall en route. At the spot called '360 Degree View', one can see areas of both Kashmir and Jammu Divisions.

Sinthan Top is the South-East end of Breng Valley (The Golden Crown of Kashmir) and is 48 km from famous Kokernag spring. The nearest hotels are located at Kokernag and Daksum ranging from extremely budget accommodation in private and Government huts to deluxe hotels. One should be able to book a night in a hotel or hut between 1500 and 3500 rupees.

One can plan to visit Lihinwan and the famous Margan Top in the Margan Valley and Inshan which are located in the same area.

In 2023, Sinthan festival was organised by District Administration Kishtwar and around 12000 tourists attended the event.

== Vailoo-Singhpora Tunnel ==
Although the tunnel plans to bypass Sinthan pass were approved in principle years ago, the action is still awaited by the government. Varying lengths of tunnel have been reported by media but maps would suggest a length of about 10 to 14 km. It was in tendering phase in May 2026. See also Tunnels in North West India.
