= National Highway 1B (India, old numbering) =

Old numbering of road in India

National Highway 1B
- Map of National Highway 1B in red

Route information
- Length: 274 km (170 mi)

Major junctions
- South end: Batote, Jammu and Kashmir
- North end: Khanbal, Jammu and Kashmir

Location
- Country: India
- States: Jammu and Kashmir: 274 km (170 mi)
- Primary destinations: Doda - Kistwar - Sinthan pass

Highway system
- Roads in India; Expressways; National; State; Asian
← NH 1A	→ NH 1C

National Highway 1B (NH 1B) was an Indian National Highway entirely within the union territory of Jammu and Kashmir. NH 1B linked Batote with Khanbal and is 274 km (170 mi) long. It has been renamed as National Highway 244.

== Route ==
- Doda
- Kistwar
- Sinthan pass
- Hemis pass

== See also ==
- List of national highways in India
- National Highways Development Project
