= Badanoo =

Village in Jammu and Kashmir

- Village
- Location in Jammu and Kashmir, India
- Coordinates: 33.137386°N 75.797438°E
- Country: India
- Union territory: Jammu and Kashmir
- Division: Jammu
- Region: Chenab Valley
- District: Doda

Population (2011)
  - Total: 450

Language
  - Spoken: Kashmiri, Bhaderwahi, Gojri
  - Official: Urdu
- Time zone: UTC+5:30 (IST)
- Pin Code: 182203
- Sarpanch: Mohd Sadiq

Badanoo is a village in Thathri tehsil of Doda district in Jammu and Kashmir. It is located at least 36 kilometres from its district headquarters. This village is the part of Patwar Halqa (revenue block) Jangalwar.

Badanoo village is located in the upper reaches of Thathri and is surrounded by forests that have the presence of leopards and other wild animals.

== Etymology ==
The word Badanoo is derived from the Kashmiri word "Ba'd Ra'in" (بَڈ رٰایٔں) which means Great Princess.

== Prominent figures ==
- Taskeen Badanvi, a prominent poet affiliated with Jammu and Kashmir Academy of Art, Culture and Languages.
