= Jai Valley =

Tourist destination in Jammu and Kashmir

- Jai Top
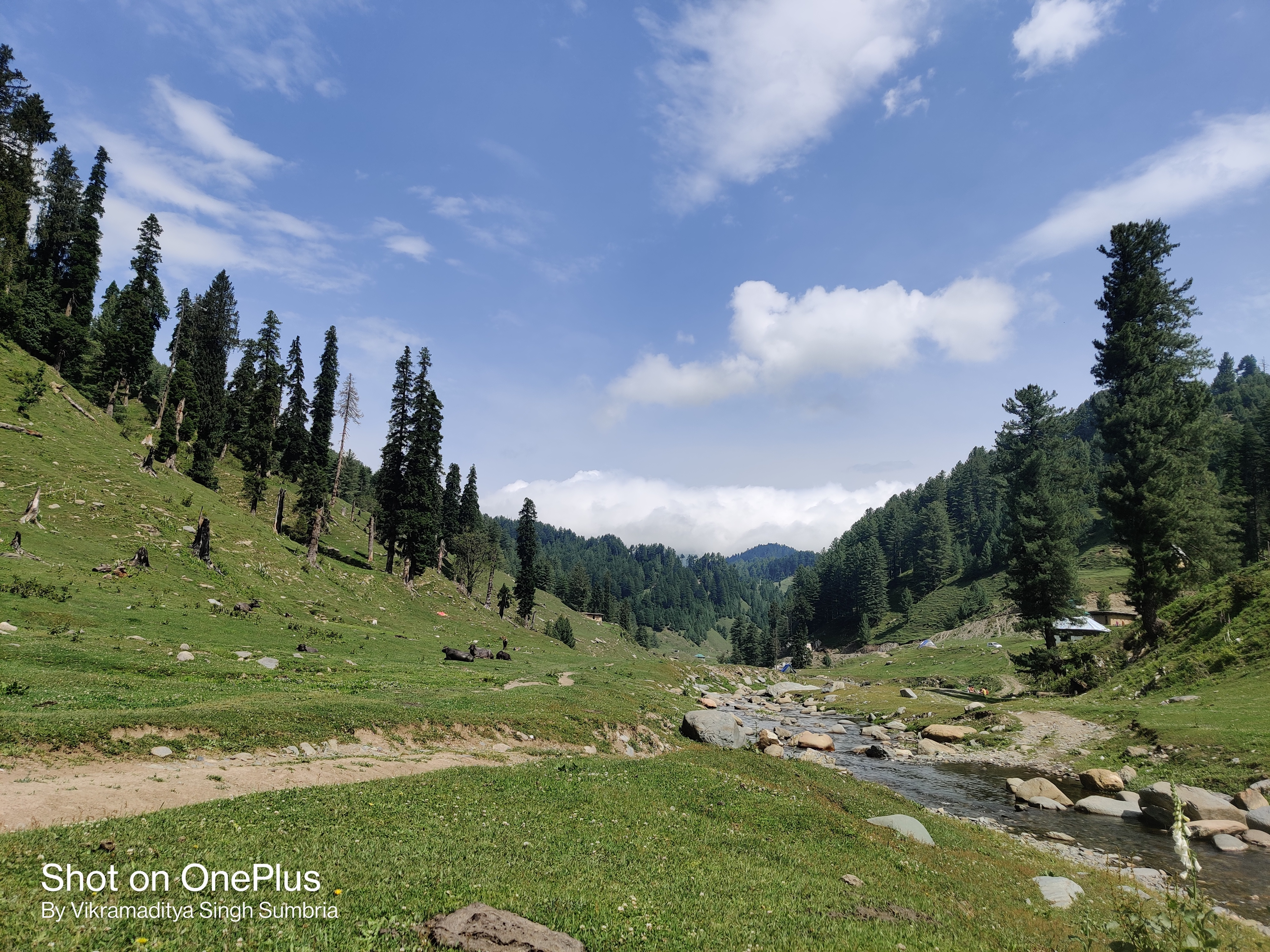
- Jai Valley in summers

- Location within Jammu and Kashmir Location within India
- Floor elevation: 7,800 ft (2,400 m)
- Length: 6 km (3.7 mi)
- Width: 0.5 km (0.31 mi)

Naming
- Native name: जाय घाटी (Jaie Ghati) (Hindi)
- English translation: Jaie Valley

Geography
- Country: India
- State: Jammu & Kashmir
- Region: Jammu
- District: Doda
- Coordinates: 33.027984°N 75.772830°E
- Interactive map of Jai Valley

Jai Valley or Jaei Valley ( Kashmiri word meaning place)(/ʒæɪ ˈvæli/) is an enchanting valley located 32 kilometres (20 miles) northeast of Bhaderwah town in Jammu and Kashmir, India. The Bhaderwah-Jai road, which passes through the corniferous deodar forests of Nakshri, Balote, Bhalra and Chinta Valley connects the valley with the Bhaderwah town. The valley has green meadows which act as the attraction for tourists in summers and the snow-covered landscape during winters. Jai valley has about 9 kilometres (5.6 miles) long meadows, bisected by a stream called Jai Nallah which merges with a tributary of river Chenab at Kahara in tehsil Thathri. It is also known by the names Jai Garh and Jai Top. The valley is also connected through a 37 kilometres (23 miles) long road with Gandoh. There is no Mobile Network in this valley.

== About ==
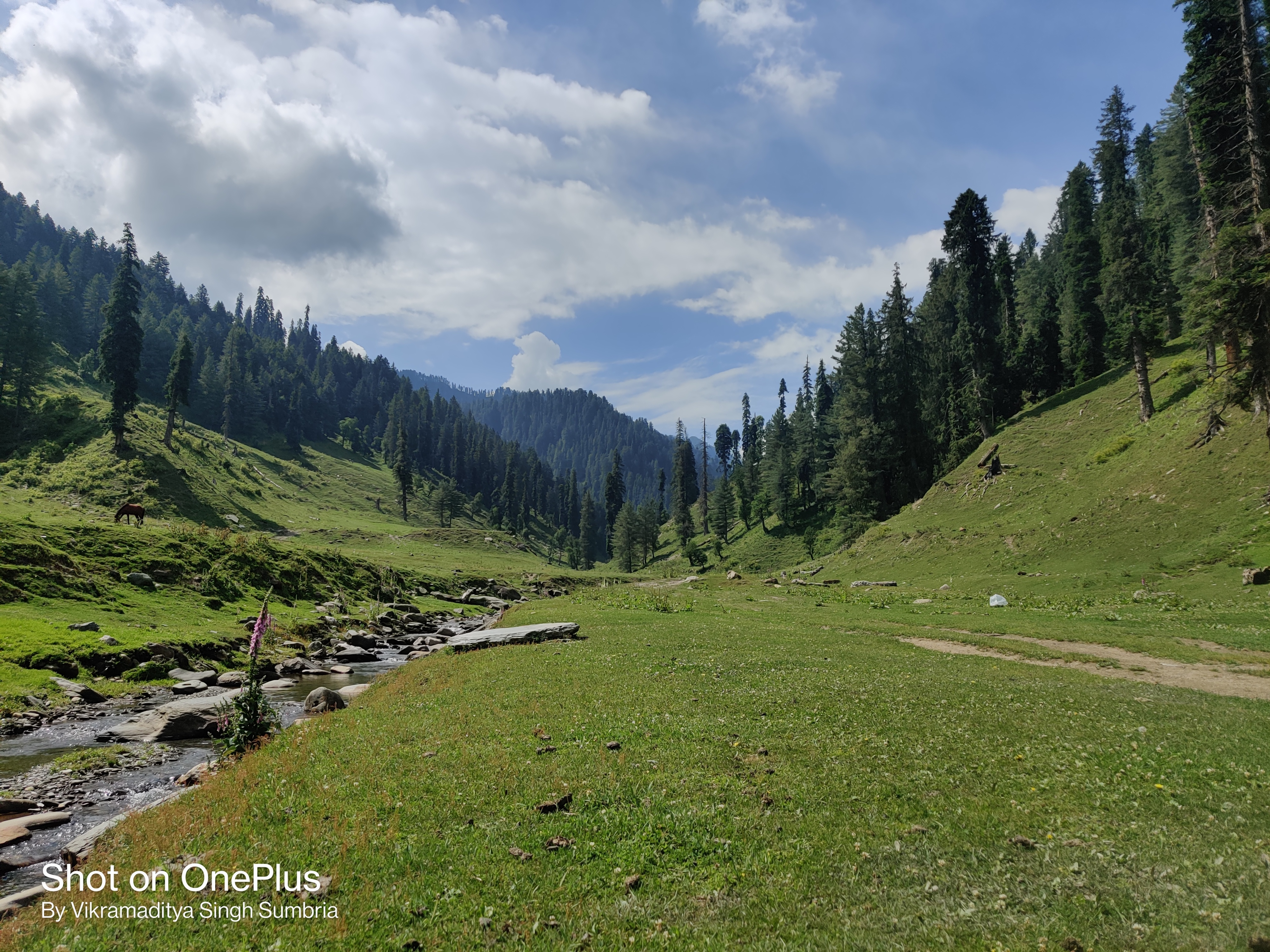
Jai Valley Bhaderwah

Jai, located in Bhaderwah tehsil (subdistrict) of Doda district in the Jammu division, it is a high altitude tourist destination, 32 kilometers northeast of Bhaderwah by Bhaderwah-Chinta-Jai Road. Every year thousands of tourist visits there, including the locals also. It is also connected with Bhalessa-Jai-Bhaderwah road. In summers, local Gurjars visit Jai along with their cattles where they have own mudhouses. (Note: Mudhouses are the temporary houses made up of wooden walls like a shack and interior side of the walls are filled with mud to stop the passage of air through wooden walls. It have the mix material used in the shack and the hut. It is called Gwaad in Kashmiri language. Mostly used by Gurjars who visited these temporary houses with livestock in Summers, as these are mostly built on higher meadows. These are also called Gojjar Kotha (a temporary house occupied by Gurjar community of Jammu and Kashmir).) The valley is surrounded with corniferous trees and towards its east lies the Bhalessa Valley which is connected through 46 kilometers Jai-Bhalessa Road, encompasses the hunting grounds of Bachdhar. (Note: a forest area having some meadows in Gandoh (Bhalessa) tehsil (subdistrict) which connects Bhalessa to Bhaderwah. The word Dhar means meadows.) Another 27 Kilometers Kahara-Jai Road also linked Kahara tehsil (subdistrict) to this valley.

Wild herbs like Guchchi (Note: a type of mushrooms (Morels) found in Himalayas. It is one of the most expensive mushrooms. It is known as Guchchi in local language.) (Morels), Kasrod (Note: Kasrod (Fiddlehead fern) is a dry vegetable. After cooking, it can be eaten with chapatis or breads. Kasrod is the local name of Fiddlehead fern.) (Fiddlehead fern) Foxglove, Aconitum, Mayapple and more can be found here.

== Tourism ==
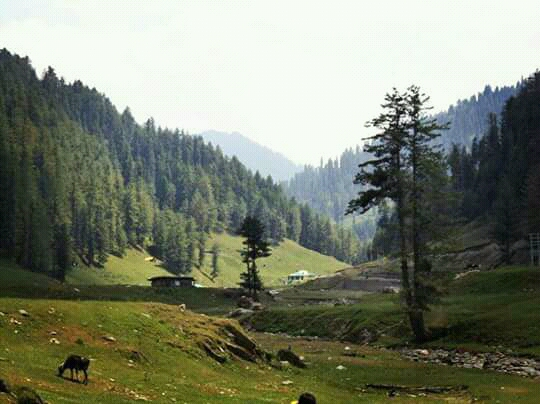
Meadows covered with pines in Jai valley of Bhaderwah, Doda district

Jai gets thousands of tourist visits every year mostly in summers. The Bhaderwah-Jai road climbs uphill in the last 30 kilometres to Jai passing through forests of pine and fir of Nakshri, Balote, Bhalara and Chinta Valley. It is one of the scenic tourist spot in Bhaderwah. There are various natural waterfalls and the activities such as rock-climbing and hard-core trekking can be performed here. The Jai Nallah is famous for Trout Fish Culture. The source of water in Jai Nallah stream are the different natural springs which are found at various places of Jai, while Chenab Valley have hundreds of these natural springs found commonly in every village and forest areas. Due to these natural springs, this stream remain running all the year.

Winter sports like skiing, ice skating and sledging can be played when the snow covers entire valley in winters. There are igloo huts for tourists to stay in the valley. Chinta and Jai valleys have the favourable climate and environment for basics and training in paragliding. Paragliding is the special attraction of hilly areas but it is feasible all over the year except wet seasons.

=== Road connectivity ===
There are three roads which connects Jai Valley to other parts, which are as follows;

==== Main road ====
1. Bhaderwah-Jai Road, a 32 kilometres (20 miles) road from Bhaderwah town to Jai Valley, having blacktop except some areas, is the main road which is commonly used to visit Jai. This road is located on the southwestern direction from Jai towards Bhaderwah town.

==== Alternate link roads ====
1. Gandoh-Jai Road, a 37 kilometres (23 miles) road from Gandoh (Bhalessa) to Jai, constructed but it lacks blacktop at maximum locations. This road is located in eastern side of Jai.
2. Kahara-Jai Road, a 27 kilometres (17 miles) road from Kahara tehsil (subdistrict) to Jai, which is under construction in 2020. This road is located on northern side of Jai.

== See also ==
=== On Wikipedia ===
- Tourist destinations in Doda district

=== External links ===
- Jai Valley - Bhaderwah in August 2015
