= Gondoh =

Gandoh is a surname. Notable people with the surname include:

- Hiroshi Gondoh (born 1938), Japanese baseball pitcher and manager
- Ryan Gondoh (born 1997), English football winger

== See also ==
- Gandoh
