= Phagsoo =

Village in Jammu and Kashmir

Figsoo
- Village/Tehsil
- Fagsu
- Location in Jammu and Kashmir, India Figsoo (India)
- Coordinates: 33.130255°N 75.769785°E
- Country: India
- Union Territory: Jammu and Kashmir
- Division: Jammu
- Region: Chenab Valley
- District: Doda

Language
  - Spoken: Kashmiri, Bhaderwahi, Gojri
  - Official: Urdu
- Time zone: UTC+5:30 (IST)
- Pin Code: 182203
- Sarpanch: Farooq Ahmed Sheikh

Phagsoo (also Fagsu) is a village and tehsil in the Doda district of the Jammu division of Jammu and Kashmir, India. It was previously part of the Thathri tehsil.

== Geography ==
Phagsoo's boundaries are a dense forest in the north, two streams (Nallahs) in the east, and the town of Jangalwar in the south.

== About and demographics ==
Phagsoo village is located 8 kilometres (5.0 mi) from Thathri, its subdistrict headquarters, and 40 kilometres (25 mi) from Doda district. The nearest villages near Phagsoo are Jangalwar, Madan Chittar, Nowtass and Kahila.

=== Demographics ===
The village is spread over 359.8 hectares (3.598 km^{2}). Its population is 2,709 (1,386 males and 1,323 females) living in 480 houses.
