= NH 1B =

NH 1B may refer to:

- National Highway 1B (India, old numbering)
- New Hampshire Route 1B, United States
