= Mahri, Jammu and Kashmir =

Village in Jammu and Kashmir

Mahri
- Village
- Location in Jammu and Kashmir, India
- Coordinates: 33.14306°N 75.779175°E
- Country: India
- Union territory: Jammu and Kashmir
- Division: Jammu
- Region: Chenab Valley
- District: Doda

Population (2011)
  - Total: 272

Language
  - Spoken: Kashmiri, Bhaderwahi, Gojri
  - Official: Urdu
- Time zone: UTC+5:30 (IST)
- Pin Code: 182203
- Sarpanch: Maneera Begum

Mahri is a village in Tehsil Thathri of Doda district in Jammu and Kashmir. This village was one of the villages of Chenab Valley which was without electricity till 2022.

== History ==
Mahri village was part of Bhaderwah tehsil in 1986; it became part of Thathri tehsil when Thathri was separated as a tehsil in Doda district. As of November 2022, Mahri is set to be electrified for the first time in the history.
