= Nandana, Jammu and Kashmir =

Village in Jammu and Kashmir

Nandana
- Village/Panchayat
- Location in Jammu and Kashmir, India
- Coordinates: 33.111599°N 75.7748883°E
- Country: India
- Union territory: Jammu and Kashmir
- Division: Jammu
- Region: Chenab Valley
- District: Doda

Population (2011)
  - Total: 1,052
- Demonym: Nandanians

Language
  - Spoken: Kashmiri, Bhaderwahi, Gojri
  - Official: Urdu
- Time zone: UTC+5:30 (IST)
- Pin Code: 182203
- Sarpanch: Maneera Begum

Nandana or Nandna is a village and panchayat in Thathri of Doda district in the union territory of Jammu and Kashmir. Nandana is located in the hilly area of Doda district and have deep gorges.
