= Daksum =

- Tourism Place
- Location in Jammu & Kashmir, India Daksum (India)
- Coordinates: 33.61°N 75.43°E
- Country: India
- Union territory: Jammu & Kashmir
- District: Anantnag
- Time zone: UTC+5:30 (IST)

Daksum Is a natural scenic spot located in the Larnoo tehsil of Anantnag district, Jammu and Kashmir, India in the disputed Kashmir region at Anantnag-Semthan-Kishtwar road (NH-244).

== Location ==
It is located at an altitude of 2,438m above the sea level. Coordinates: 33°36'43"N 75°26'6"E. It is 42 km from the district headquarters Anantnag and about 100 km from summer capital Srinagar, on the trekking route to Kishtwar. On the way to Daksum there is Botanical garden and spring called Kokernag one can enjoy. .One can reach Daksum by arriving vailoo, which is the base camp and from there one can board a cab. From there the trail leads to Sinthan Pass and Sinthan top.

== Sources ==
- Article title
- https://web.archive.org/web/20120325155614/http://www.greaterkashmir.com/news/2011/Jul/16/govt-yet-to-bring-daksum-sinthan-top-on-tourist-map-54.asp
- http://www.oktatabyebye.com/destination-features/1901-about-daksum-pahalgam.html
- http://millitravels.com/Daksum.aspx
