= Jamia Masjid, Bhaderwah =

Mosque in Jammu and Kashmir

Jamia Masjid Bhaderwah
- جامع مسجد بھدرواہ
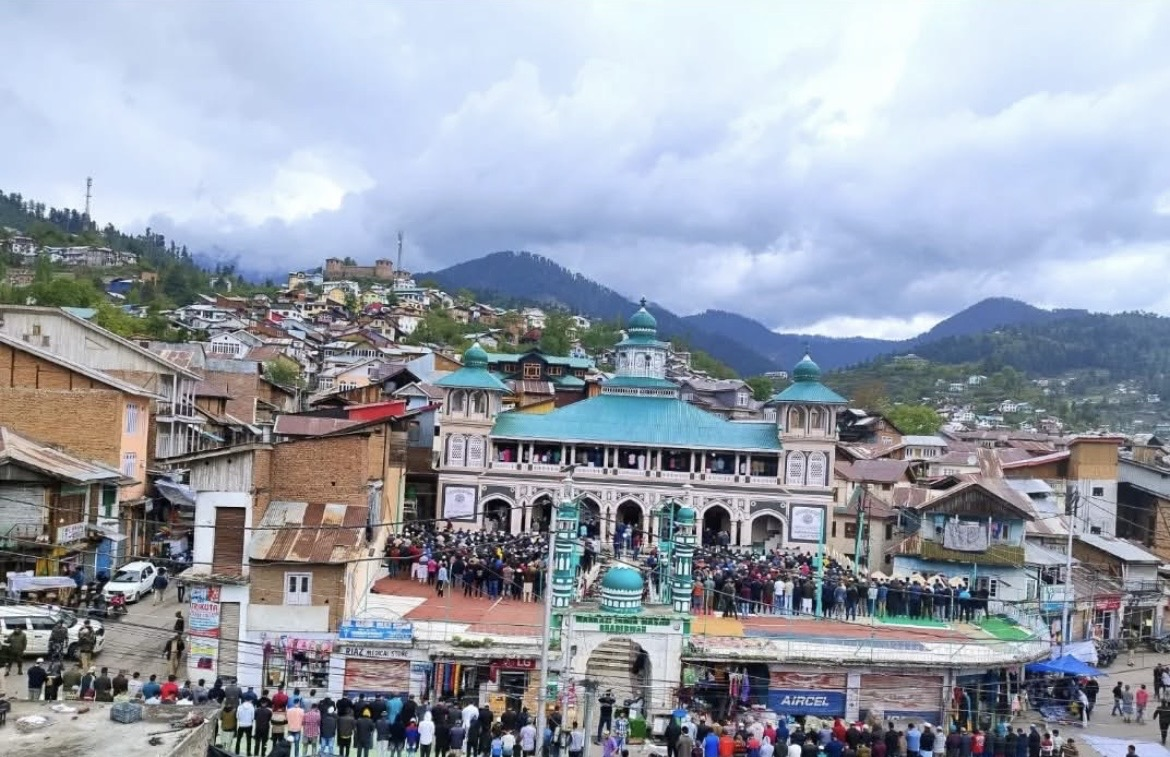
- Jamia Masjid Bhaderwah

Religion
- Affiliation: Islam

Location
- Location: Bhaderwah, Doda district, Jammu and Kashmir, India
- Country: India
- Interactive map of Jamia Masjid Bhaderwah
- Coordinates: 32.9793574°N 75.7155107°E

Jamia Masjid Bhaderwah (also known as Markazi Jamia Masjid Bhaderwah) is a historic Friday mosque located in the town of Bhaderwah in the Doda district of the Indian union territory of Jammu and Kashmir. It is the oldest mosque in the Doda district and is listed among the major tourist attractions and heritage sites of Bhaderwah by the Directorate of Tourism Jammu. It serves as the principal place of congregational Friday prayers for the Muslim community of Bhaderwah, with the largest gatherings of Muslims in the town occurring here on Fridays.

The original Jamia Masjid stood approximately fifty yards below the present structure, built on the bank of a mountain stream flowing nearby. Adjacent to it were two further buildings — an Islamia School and an orphanage — which together formed a significant religious and educational complex in the town.

== History ==
In 1928, a catastrophic flood caused by a mighty cloudburst engulfed the Bhaderwah valley, destroying a major portion of the town along with its people and cattle. The deluge resulted in the complete destruction of the original Jamia Masjid, along with its associated Islamia School and orphanage. The present mosque was subsequently constructed at a new site following this calamity.

== Architecture ==
The present Jamia Masjid is described as one of the most imposing constructions in Bhaderwah, its design immediately drawing the attention of visitors. The structure consists of a central building with two halls and side rooms, with lofty minarets rising at the corners. The quality of its architectural workmanship has been noted as comparable to similar religious structures elsewhere in India.

== Significance ==
The Jamia Masjid is recognised as a heritage site of Bhaderwah by the Directorate of Tourism Jammu and is listed as a place of interest by the District Administration of Doda. It is also listed as a tourist attraction by the J&K Tourism Department alongside the Vasuki Nag Temple and a Fort.

The mosque has also served as the focal point of civic and communal gatherings in Bhaderwah. In June 2022, a large number of protesters gathered outside the mosque in response to a communally sensitive incident, with significant security deployment by police and paramilitary forces in and around the site. In April 2025, the Anjuman-e-Islamia Bhaderwah took out a march from the mosque to Bhaderwah police station in protest against an objectionable social media post.

== See also ==
- Bhaderwah
- Doda district
- Jamia Masjid, Srinagar
- Jamia Masjid Thathri
- Jamia Masjid Kishtwar
