= Kahara, Jammu and Kashmir =

Village in Jammu & Kashmir, India

Kahara
- Village/tehsil
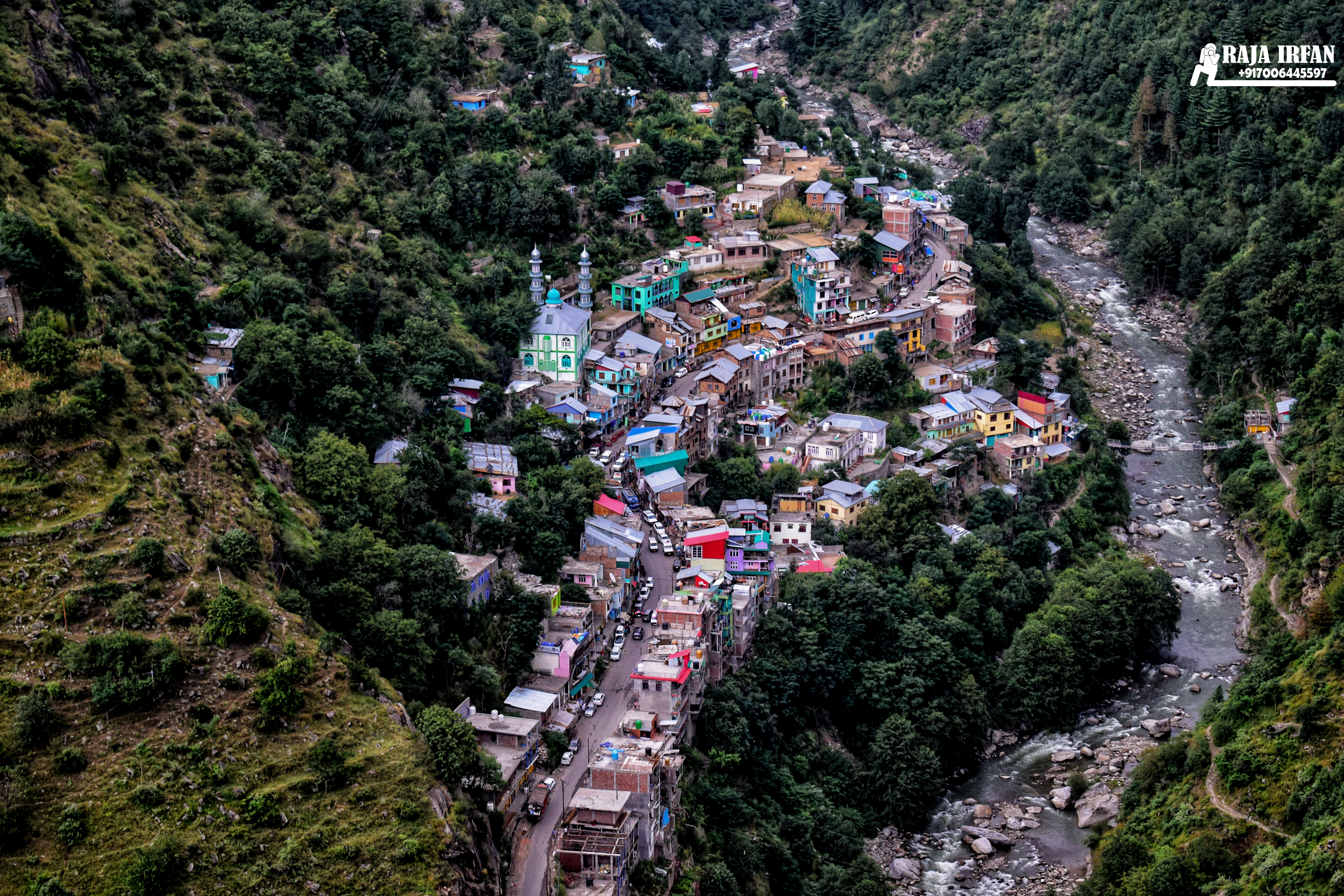

- Location in Jammu and Kashmir, India
- Coordinates: 33.093°N 75.870°E
- Country: India
- Union Territory: Jammu & Kashmir
- Division: Jammu
- District: Doda

Area
  - Total: 1.50 km^{2} (0.58 sq mi)
- Demonym(s): Kashmiri, Bhalessi, Bhaderwahi, Sarazi, Gojri, Bhalessi

Languages
  - Official Language: Urdu
  - Spoken: Kashmiri, Gojari, Bhadarwahi, Urdu
- Time zone: UTC+5:30 (IST)
- PIN: 182203
- DDC Member: Mehraj Din Malik (Aam Aadmi Party)

Kahara is a village and tehsil in the Doda district of the Jammu division of the Indian union territory of Jammu and Kashmir. It is situated between mountainous cliffs 13 kilometres (8.1 mi) from Thathri on the Thathri-Gandoh road.

== Geography ==
Kahara is located on the bank of the river Kalgoni and is a hilly area in the Doda district, with several villages including Indloo ,Joura Kalan, Joura Khurd, Budhi, Kunthal, Shamdlian, Jia Halaran, Halaran, Kencha, Tanta, Malanoo and Batogra.

Kahara was part of Thathri tehsil as a block. It was separated as a new tehsil in 2007 and is now part of the subdivision Thathri. Kahara is on the Thathri-Gandoh road, which links with National Highway 244 at Thathri.

Kahara is considered as central place and business hub for the peripheral villages. The tehsil headquarter is well connected with the rural village roads like Kahara–Jai Road, Kahara–Tanta Road, Kahara–Kansoo Road, etc. The main stay of the region is mostly farming as around 90% of the population is rural and directly or indirectly dependent on the agriculture and allied sectors and thus constitutes the main source of livelihood.

== Politics ==
Mehraj Malik is the District Development Council councilor from the Kahara constituency.
