= Jamia Masjid Kishtwar =

Mosque in Jammu and Kashmir, India

- مرکزی جامع مسجد کشتوار
- Location in Jammu and Kashmir, India

Religion
- Affiliation: Islam
- Ecclesiastical or organizational status: Active
- Status: Mosque

Location
- Location: Kishtwar, Kishtwar district, Jammu and Kashmir, India
- Interactive map of Jamia Masjid Kishtwar
- Coordinates: 33°18′44″N 75°46′05″E

Architecture
- Type: Mosque
- Founder: Shah Akhyar ud Din (RA)
- Groundbreaking: c. 1910s
- Completed: Rebuilt and extended c. 2001

Specifications
- Capacity: Approximately 5,000 worshippers
- Minaret: 2

The Jamia Masjid Kishtwar, also known as the Markazi Jamia Masjid Kishtwar, is a mosque located in the town of Kishtwar, in the Kishtwar district of Jammu and Kashmir, India. It serves as the central mosque for the local Muslim community and is one of the largest in the region.

== History ==
Local accounts describe the Jamia Masjid Kishtwar as the oldest mosque in Kishtwar district, with claims that a mosque existed in Kishtwar before 1650 AD, followed by structures such as Masjid-e-Faridiya and the current Jamia Masjid. These references to pre-1650 origins are not consistently corroborated for the present building and may pertain to earlier mosques or predecessor structures in the area.

The foundation of the current Jamia Masjid was laid by Shah Akhyar ud Din (RA) approximately 110 years ago, in the early 20th century.

Major construction and extensions began in 1941 AD, featuring two minarets originally around 60 feet tall each. It was one of the largest mosques in the Jammu province.

The mosque was severely damaged by a fire on the night of 1 January 2001. With contributions from the local population and support from Auqaf-e-Islamia, reconstruction and expansion followed, resulting in a three-storied complex. The new design includes two minarets of 130 feet height, additional shops within the premises, and an increased capacity to accommodate thousands of worshippers. Upon completion, it was one of the largest mosques in Jammu and Kashmir and a potential tourist attraction.

== See also ==
- Kishtwar district
- Jamia Masjid Thathri
- Jamia Masjid, Bhaderwah
