= Thathri–Gandoh National Highway =

Road in Jammu and Kashmir

Thathri–Gandoh Road

Route information
- Length: 30 km (19 mi)

Major junctions
- From: Thathri
- To: Gandoh

Location
- Country: India
- States: Jammu and Kashmir
- Primary destinations: Thathri, Kahara, Gandoh

Highway system
- Roads in India; Expressways; National; State; Asian

Thathri–Gandoh National Highway (also known as Thathri–Gandoh Road) is a 30-kilometre (19 mi) road that connects Thathri to Gandoh, located in the Doda district of Jammu and Kashmir, India. The road serves as a lifeline for the people living in the Bhalessa region as it provides access to various link roads leading to rural and far-flung areas. In 2022, this road was declared a National Highway by Lieutenant Governor of Jammu and Kashmir Manoj Sinha.

== History ==
The Thathri–Gandoh Road was initially proposed by Prime Minister Bakshi Ghulam Mohammad in 1962, but the construction did not commence until 1967–1968. For a considerable time, the road was operational up to Kahara, located 12 kilometres (7.5 mi) away from Thathri. However, it was only in 1975 that the road was made motorable up to Gandoh town, albeit only in fair weather conditions. In 2022, it was declared a National Highway.

== Route ==
The Thathri–Gandoh National Highway starts from Thathri, located at an altitude of 750 metres (2,460 ft) above sea level (ASL), and traverses through the scenic landscape of the Bhalessa region before reaching Gandoh, which is situated at an altitude of 1,400 metres (4,600 ft) ASL. The road passes through several small towns and villages, including Kahara, Jakyas, Bhatyas, etc., providing access to various government offices, hospitals, schools, and markets. The highway is prone to accidents.
