= Jantroon Dhar =

Jantroon is hill station in Thathri

- Jantroon Top
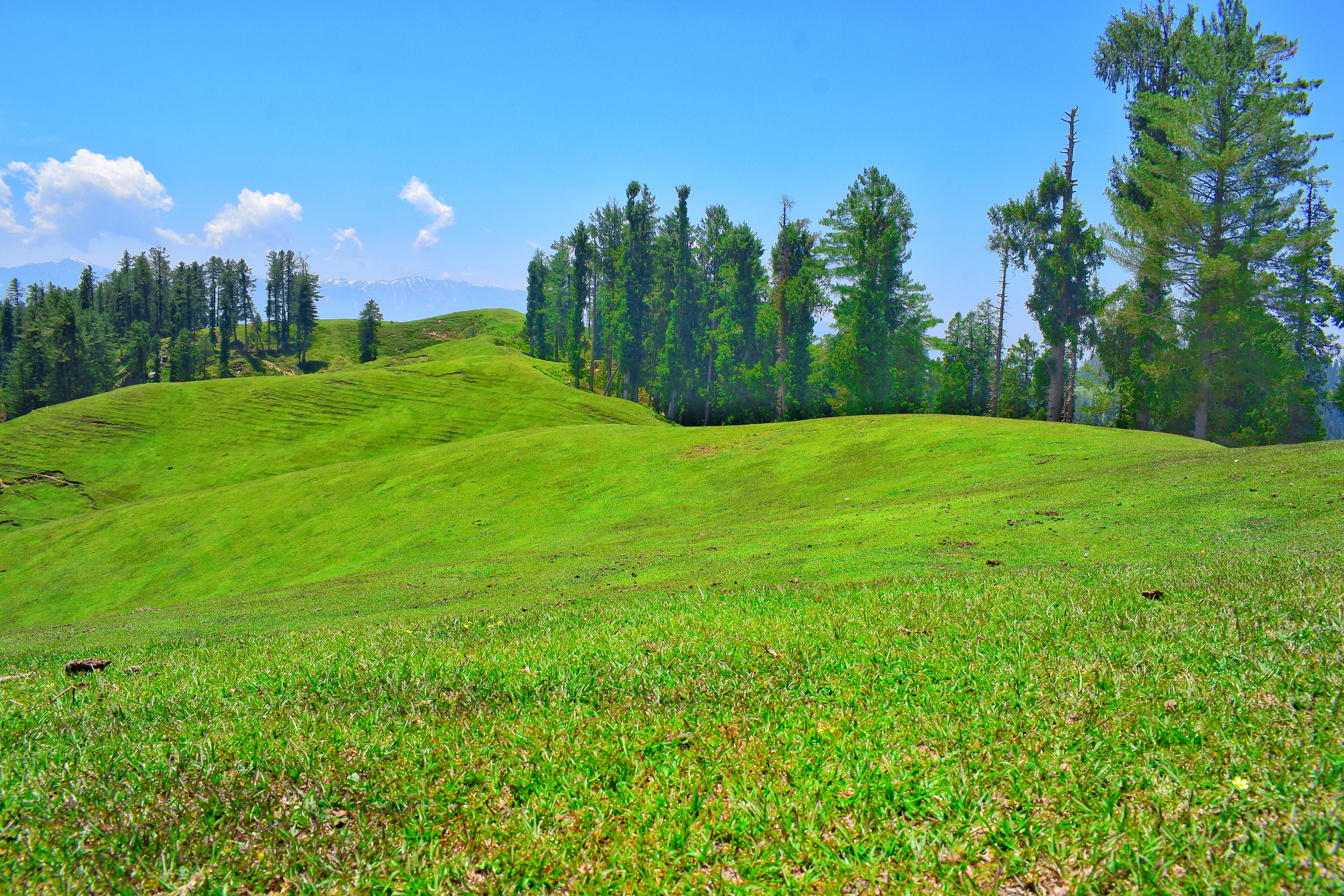
- A meadow of Jantroon in June 2020

- Location within Jammu and Kashmir
- Length: 7 mi (11 km)
- Width: 1.5 mi (2.4 km)

Geography
- State/Province: Chenab Valley, Jammu and Kashmir
- District: Doda
- Population center: Thathri
- Borders on: Bhaderwah; Bhalessa
- Coordinates: 33.093881°N 75.773008°E
- Mountain range: Pir Panjal Range
- Interactive map of Jantroon Dhar

Jantroon Dhar or Jantroon Top is a location in the Doda district, in Jammu and Kashmir, India. It is a local hill station and a meadow in the Forest Block area, 15 kilometers away from Thathri. The place is surrounded by lush green meadows, snow in winters and covered with dense vegetation. Thousands of local tourists visit every year for spectating three days dangal-cum-wrestling match.

== Etymology ==
The word Jantroon is derived from Gojri phrase "Jannat Ma Roon" (trans: Living in Paradise) which later emerged as Jantroon.

== Geography ==
The hill station lies in the tehsil Chiralla and Jammu and Kashmir, earlier in Thathri tehsil of Jammu and Kashmir and does not have any population or households near it. Local tourists visit annually in Summer to explore the place.

== Development ==
As of 2019 Jantroon Dhar is 5 km away from the nearest road. Plans have been discussed by the district development commissioner to connect it to the road network.
