= Jamia Masjid Thathri =

Mosque in Jammu and Kashmir, India

- جامع مسجد ٹھاٹھری
- Location within Jammu and Kashmir

Religion
- Affiliation: Islam
- Status: Active

Location
- Location: Thathri, Doda district, Jammu and Kashmir, India
- Interactive map of Jamia Masjid Thathri
- Coordinates: 33.1449340°N 75.7920619°E

Architecture
- Type: Mosque
- Established: 1960s

Specifications
- Dome: 1
- Minaret: 2

Jamia Masjid Thathri is the principal congregational mosque located in the town of Thathri in Doda district of Jammu and Kashmir, India. Established in the 1960s, the mosque serves as a central place of worship for Muslims in Thathri and surrounding areas. It is recognized locally for hosting large congregational prayers, particularly on Fridays and major Islamic occasions.

The mosque features a white exterior structure with a central dome and two minarets.

== History ==
Jamia Masjid Thathri was constructed during the 1960s as a congregational mosque for the growing population of Thathri. The mosque was established with support from local residents and community leaders to provide a central space for Friday prayers and religious gatherings.

Over the years, the mosque has undergone maintenance and development under the supervision of a local administrative body known as the Jamia Masjid Committee Thathri. The committee manages the mosque's affairs, including maintenance, construction activities, and organization of religious events.

== Architecture ==
The mosque is built in a traditional style common to many congregational mosques in the Chenab Valley region. The structure includes a central dome above the main prayer hall and two tall minarets that are visible from different parts of Thathri town. Arched windows and entrances allow natural light into the prayer space.

Due to its location within the hillside settlement of Thathri, the mosque stands prominently among the surrounding residential buildings.

== Religious leadership ==
The mosque is led by an Imam who conducts daily prayers and delivers sermons. The current Imam is Mohd Shafqat Qasmi, who succeeded Bashir Ahmed Zargar following Zargar's death.

Jamia Masjid Thathri serves as an important religious and social center for the Muslim population of Thathri. The mosque hosts weekly Friday congregational prayers and gatherings during major Islamic occasions such as Ramadan and Eid.

Regional media reports have noted large congregations at mosques across the Chenab Valley, including Jamia Masjid Thathri, during the first Friday of Ramadan when worshippers gathered for prayers under security arrangements.

The mosque has also been referenced in regional reporting on religious observances such as Jumat-ul-Vida, the last Friday of Ramadan, which is widely observed across Jammu and Kashmir.

In addition to religious activities, the mosque's committee occasionally issues statements on public matters. In 2023, the president of the Jamia Masjid Committee Thathri condemned a terrorist attack in Rajouri and described it as an act of cowardice.

== See also ==
- Thathri
- Doda district
- Jamia Masjid Kishtwar
- Jamia Masjid, Bhaderwah
- Mosques in India
