= Khanbal =

Khanbal Khanabal
- town
- Location in Jammu and Kashmir, India Khanbal (India)
- Coordinates: 34°28′0″N 74°1′0″E
- Country: India
- Union Territory: Jammu and Kashmir
- District: Kupwara
- Elevation: 2,083 m (6,834 ft)

Languages
  - Official: Kashmiri, Urdu, Hindi, Dogri, English
- Time zone: UTC+5:30 (IST)
- PIN: 193224
- Coastline: 0 kilometres (0 mi)

Khanbal is a town in Kupwara district, Jammu and Kashmir, India.

== Geography ==
It is located at 34°28′0″N 74°1′0″E at an elevation of 2083 m above MSL.

== Location ==
National Highway 1B ends at Khanbal.
