= Shibnote =

Village and rafting location in India

- Village
- Location in Jammu and Kashmir, India
- Coordinates: 33°09′04″N 75°40′22″E
- Country: India
- Union territory: Jammu and Kashmir
- Division: Jammu region
- Region: Chenab valley
- District: Doda
- Subdistrict: Thathri

Population (2011)
  - Total: 243
- Demonym(s): Bhaderwahi and Kashmiri

Language
  - Spoken: Kashmiri, Bhaderwahi, Sarazi
  - Official: Urdu
- Time zone: UTC+5:30 (IST)
- Postal code: 182203

Shibnote is a village in Thathri sub-division of Doda district in Jammu and Kashmir.

== Demographics ==
Shibnote village is located in the Thathri subdivision of Doda district. This village is known for its whitewater rafting point, which was established in 2021 after the Chenab White Water Rafting Festival was organised at this place. The village also has a sand mine that is used for sand extraction purposes.

=== Education ===
In 1995, a primary level government school was established in Shibnote village.

== Whitewater Rafting ==
Shibnote is one of the notable destinations for whitewater rafting on the Chenab river. The commercial rafting at this location was started in 2021 after district administration Doda initiated the Chenab Whitewater Rafting Festival. This festival has been organised every year since then.

=== Rapids ===
On the 4 kilometre stretch of river Chenab where rafting point is located, there are five main rapids, some of which are named The Sagar's Surprise, JK's Heaven, and The Caliper. The two names, "Sagar's Surprise" and "The Caliper," were given after the names of key participants in the first ever Rafting Festival on Chenab, including Dr.Sagar D.Doifode, IAS (as The Sagar's Surprise), who was Deputy Commissioner / District Magistrate, Doda in 2021, and Athar Amin Zargar (as The Caliper), who is Sub-Divisional Magistrate Thathri.
