= Chinta Valley =

Valley and village in Jammu and Kashmir, India

- Location within Jammu and Kashmir Location within India
- Floor elevation: 6,500 ft (2,000 m)

Naming
- Native name: चिन्ता घाटी (Hindi)
- English translation: Chinta Valley

Geography
- Country: India
- State: Jammu and Kashmir
- Region: Jammu region
- District: Doda district
- Coordinates: 33.017365°N 75.727157°E
- Interactive map of Chinta Valley

Chinta Valley is a valley and a village located 20 kilometres (12 miles) northeast of Bhaderwah town on Bhaderwah-Jai road. It is covered with thick coniferous forests from all sides with a stream flowing through it known as Chinta Nallah. (Note: Nallah is local word which refers to water stream or rivulet.) A village called Thuba divides the valley from Bhaderwah. Chinta Valley is known for its beauty and it is famous place for tourist.

== About ==
Chinta is situated at the elevation of 6,500 ft above sea level in Bhaderwah tehsil (subdistrict) of Doda district. Famous Subarnag peak having Subarnag temple (Note: Subar Nag Temple, an ancient temple dedicated to Subar Nag or Seshnag; a serpentine divinity in the Hindu religion, is located in the Doda district.) (10,200 ft above sea level) is only six Kilometers far through bridle path near the Bhaderwah-Chinta road. Bhaderwah Festival is celebrated every year starts from Raksha Bandan and ends on the full moon day of November in Chinta and other villages of Bhaderwah. A Govt Primary Health Center (PHC) is also located in Chinta.

== Tourism ==
Chinta is one of the tourist destinations in Bhaderwah, Jammu and Kashmir. Chinta and Jai valleys have the favourable climate and environment for basics and training in paragliding. Paragliding is the special attraction of hilly areas but it is feasible all over the year except wet seasons. Six kilometres before Chinta Valley, on the Chinta-Bhaderwah road, a footpath leads towards the Subarnag peak, where everyone can get a sweeping view of the Chinta valley and the entire town of Bhaderwah.

=== Road connectivity ===
There are three roads which connects Jai Valley to other parts, which are as follows;

==== Main road ====
- Bhaderwah-Chinta-Jai Road, a 32 kilometres (20 miles) road from Bhaderwah town to Jai Valley passing through Chinta at a distance of 20 kilometres (12 miles), having blacktop except some areas, is the main road which is commonly used to visit Chinta.

==== Alternate roads ====
There are two under construction alternate roads which are actually meant for Jai Valley known as Gandoh-Jai Road and Kahara-Jai Road but they can be used for Chinta also because Chinta is at a distance of 10 Kilometers south from Jai.

== Famous food ==
Bhaderwahi kidney beans are very famous in the Jammu region. These bean are intercropped with maizes in the Chinta Valley of Doda district.
