= G. M. Bhat =

Geologist from Jammu and Kashmir

Prof. G. M. Bhat
- Born: 2 July 1959 (age 67); Srinagar, Jammu and Kashmir
- Education: University of Kashmir (BA, MA), University of Jammu (Ph.D)
- Occupation: Geologist

G. M. Bhat (born 2 July 1959) is a geologist from Jammu and Kashmir, India. He was the head professor at Department of Geology of Jammu University.

In 2020, he was nominated as a member of the Scientific Board of Geoscience Programme (IGCP) by the United Nations Educational, Scientific and Cultural Organization (UNESCO).

In addition to his work as a professor, Bhat has also served as the Head of the Geological Department at Jammu University.

== Early life ==
Ghulam M. Bhat was born on 2 July 1959 in Srinagar. He has received his Bachelor of Science degree from Kashmir University in Srinagar, India in 1979. He then went on to earn his Master of Science from Jammu University in 1981 and his Master of Philosophy from the same institution in 1983. In 1987, he completed his Doctor of Philosophy degree from Jammu University.

== Career ==
G.M. Bhat started his career as a lecturer in higher education in Srinagar in 1986–1987. He then joined Jammu University in 1987 and served as a lecturer until 1992. He was promoted to senior lecturer in 1992 and served in this position until 1998. In 1997, he was designated as a reader in sedimentology and biostratigraphy. In 1999, he became a reader in the department of geology and geophysics at the University of Kashmir in Srinagar.

Throughout his career, Bhat has been an active member of various professional organizations. He has served as the chairman of the Siwalik Research Group and as the convener of the Convention of Indian Association Sedimentologists in 1999. He has also been the convener of the International Research Working Group on Mitigation of Natural Hazards in Jammu and Kashmir in 1999. Bhat has served as the head of the Geological Department at Jammu University.

In 2013, he was appointed as rector at Bhaderwah Campus of Jammu University.

== Works ==
He has published numbers of articles and books, some of them are as follow;

1. "Petrogenesis of the flood basalts from the Early Permian Panjal Traps, Kashmir, India: Geochemical evidence for shallow melting of the mantle" (2014/9/1) by J Gregory Shellnutt, Ghulam M Bhat, Kuo-Lung Wang, Michael E Brookfield, Bor-Ming Jahn, Jaroslav Dostal.
2. "No link between the Panjal Traps (Kashmir) and the Late Permian mass extinctions" (2011/10) by JG Shellnutt, GM Bhat, ME Brookfield, B‐M Jahn.
3. "Two-stage marine anoxia and biotic response during the Permian–Triassic transition in Kashmir, northern India: pyrite framboid evidence" (2019/1/1) by Yuangeng Huang, Zhong-Qiang Chen, Thomas J Algeo, Laishi Zhao, Aymon Baud, Ghulam M Bhat, Lei Zhang, Zhen Guo.
4. "Origin of the silicic volcanic rocks of the Early Permian Panjal Traps, Kashmir, India" (2012/12/12) by J Gregory Shellnutt, Ghulam M Bhat, Kuo-Lung Wang, Michael E Brookfield, Jaroslav Dostal, Bor-Ming Jahn.
5. "Hot springs and the geothermal energy potential of Jammu & Kashmir State, NW Himalaya, India" (2013/11/1) by J Craig, A Absar, G Bhat, G Cadel, M Hafiz, N Hakhoo, R Kasskari, J Moore, TE Ricchiuto, J Thurow, B Thusu.
6. "Petroleum systems and hydrocarbon potential of the North-West Himalaya of India and Pakistan" (2018/12/1) by J Craig, N Hakhoo, GM Bhat, M Hafiz, MR Khan, R Misra, SK Pandita, BK Raina, J Thurow, B Thusu, W Ahmed, S Khullar.
7. "Geology and hydrocarbon potential of Neoproterozoic–Cambrian Basins in Asia: an introduction" (2012) by GM Bhat, J Craig, M Hafiz, N Hakhoo, JW Thurow, B Thusu, A Cozzi.
8. "Depositional environments and diagenesis of the kuldhar and Keera Dome carbonates (Late Bathonian–Early Callovian) of Western India" (2006/10/1) by AHM Ahmad, GM Bhat, M Haris Azim Khan.
9. Foundations: DN Wadia and his links with the Geology Department at the University of Jammu, India (2016) by E. R. Craig-Geen, GM Bhat, Jonathan Craig, Bindra Thusu.
10. Geology and Hydrocarbon Potential of Neoproterozoic-Cambrian Basins in Asia.
11. Geoenvironment : challenges ahead.
12. Northwest Himalayan successions along Jammu-Srinagar transect : field guide.
