= Shiladesh =

Valley in Himachal Pradesh, India

Shiladesh is a ravi in Himachal Pradesh, India, approximately 140 km (87 mi) from the state capital, Shimla.
