= Chiralla =

- Village
- Location in Jammu and Kashmir, India
- Coordinates: 33°02′30″N 75°40′40″E
- Country: India
- Union territory: Jammu and Kashmir
- Region: Jammu region
- District: Doda

Population (2011)
  - Total: 5,502
- Demonym: Bhaderwahi

Language
  - Spoken: Kashmiri, Bhaderwahi, Gojri
  - Official: Urdu
- Time zone: UTC+5:30 (IST)
- Postal code: 182203

Chiralla is an Indian village and a tehsil in Doda district of Jammu and Kashmir. It was formerly part of Thathri tehsil and block. This tehsil have 9 Panchayats including Bhallara, Chagsoo, Jagota, Chiralla, Panshei, Puneja, Rokali, Sunarthawa and Thallela.

== Population ==
According to Census 2011, the total population of tehsil Chiralla is 5,502.
