= Sham Valley =

Valley in the Himalayas

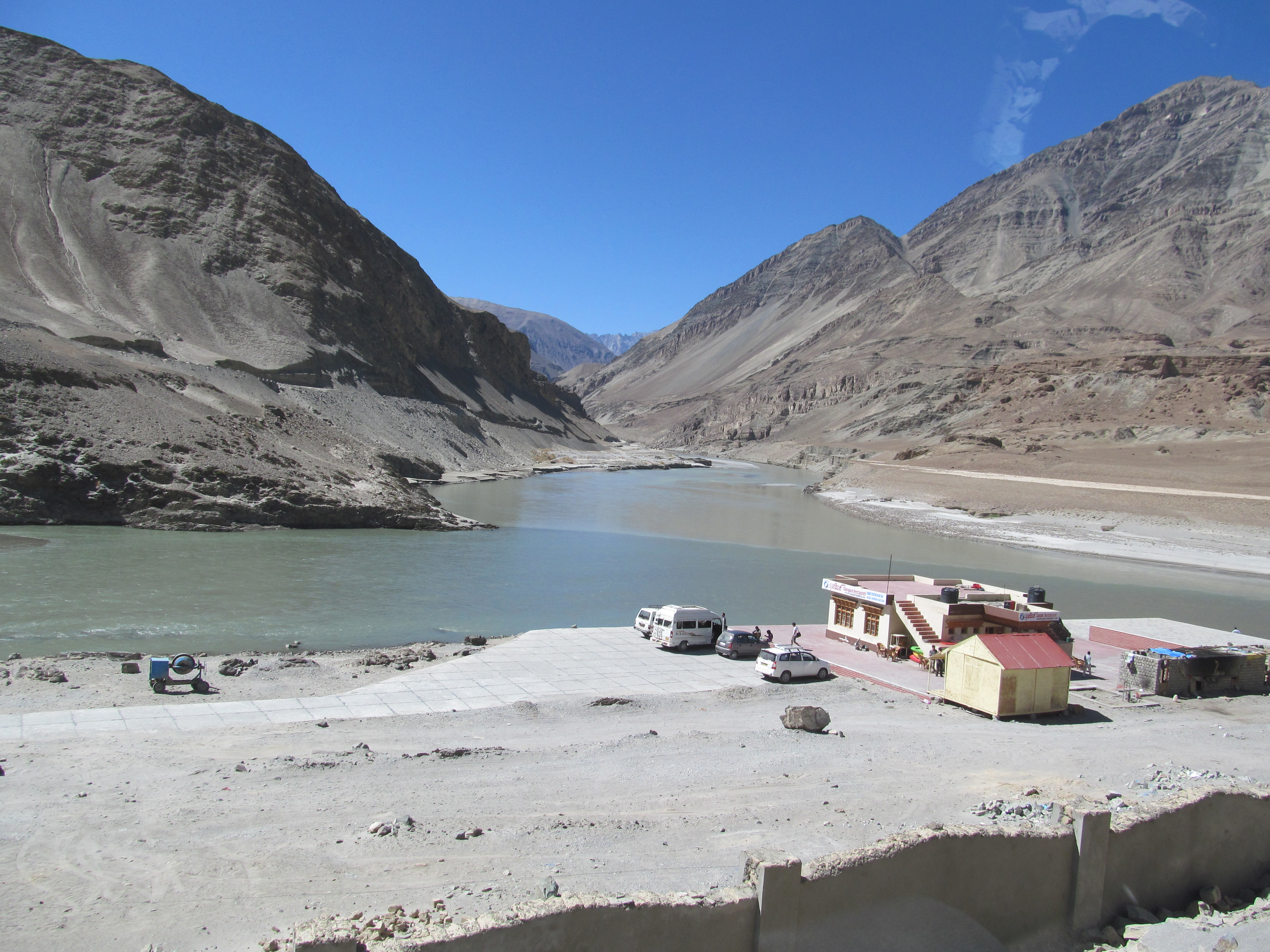
The confluence of the Zanskar River (from top) and the Indus (bottom flowing from left to right), 3 km southeast of Nimmu/Nimu/Nimoo village along NH1 Srinagar-Kargil-Leh Highway in Sham Valley in Ladakh, revered as a sacred prayag in Hinduism and Buddhism is a popular spot for photography, river rafting, etc.

Sham Valley, nicknamed the "Apricot Valley", is a Himalayan valley along the Indus River and NH1 - Srinagar-Kargil-Leh National Highway in the Sham district of the Indian Union Territory of Ladakh. The valley is located around 170 kilometres from Kargil and 180 kilometres from the Ladakh's capital Leh. The nearest airport is Kushok Bakula Rimpochee Airport in Leh.

The valley, which starts from Spituk and also includes area till Lamayouro, is well known amongst trekkers. The valley is 32 km long and it takes 4-5 days to complete the trek. The maximum elevation is 3874 metres. Likir village located in the valley is famous for its Buddhist Monastery.

== History ==
On 16 August 2024, the Union Minister of Home Affairs Amit Shah announced the creation of five new districts in Ladakh including Sham valley.

== Economy ==
Apricot is region's main crop. For this reason the valley is called as 'Apricot valley'.

== Major tourist attractions ==
- Gurudwara Pathar Sahib
- Magnetic Hill
- Confluence of Indus River and Zanskar River
- Basgo Monastery
- Likir Monastery
- Alchi Monastery
- Rizong Monastery
- Lamayuru Monastery
- Saspol Caves
- Mangyu temple complex

== Images ==
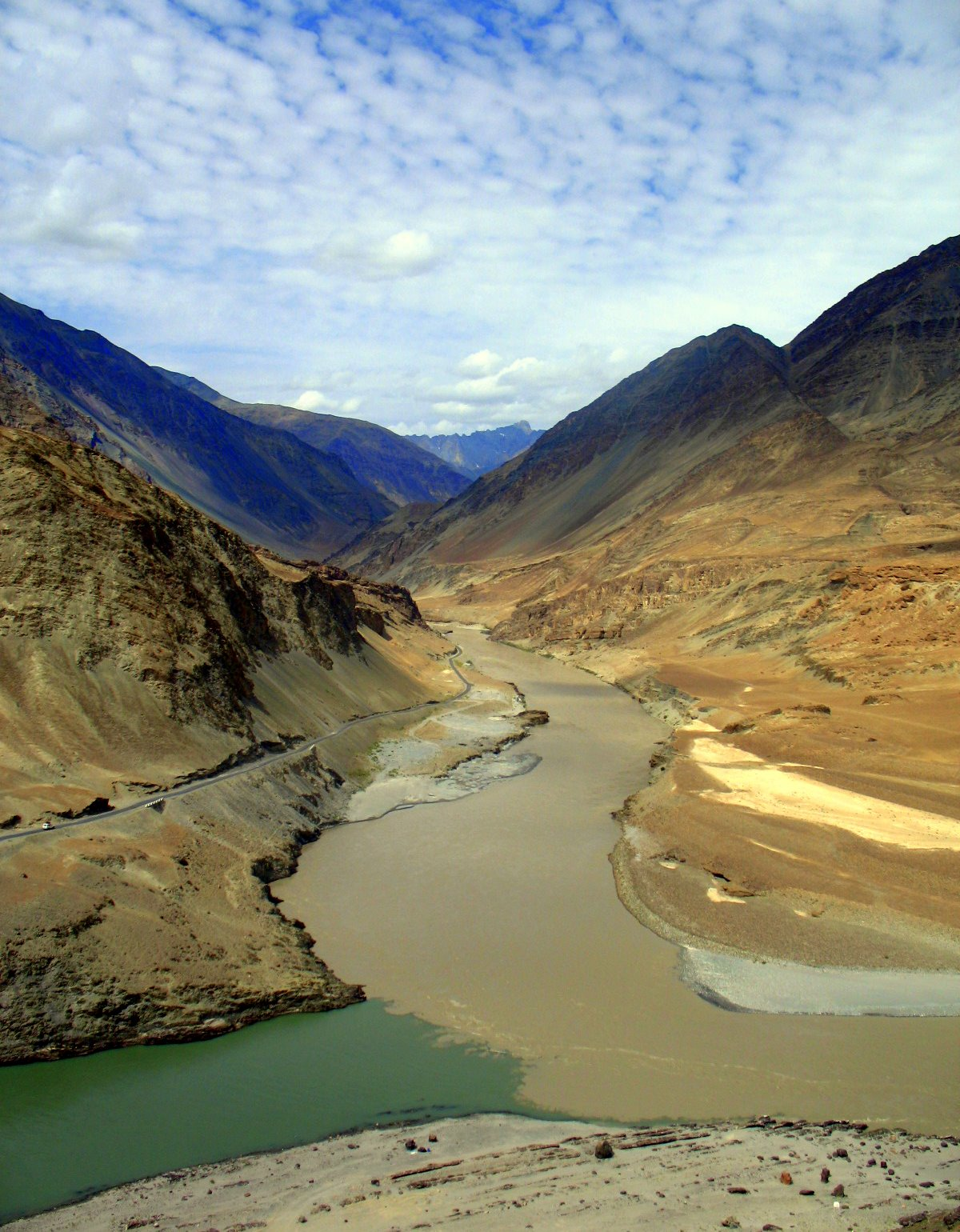
Indus–Zanskar River confluence

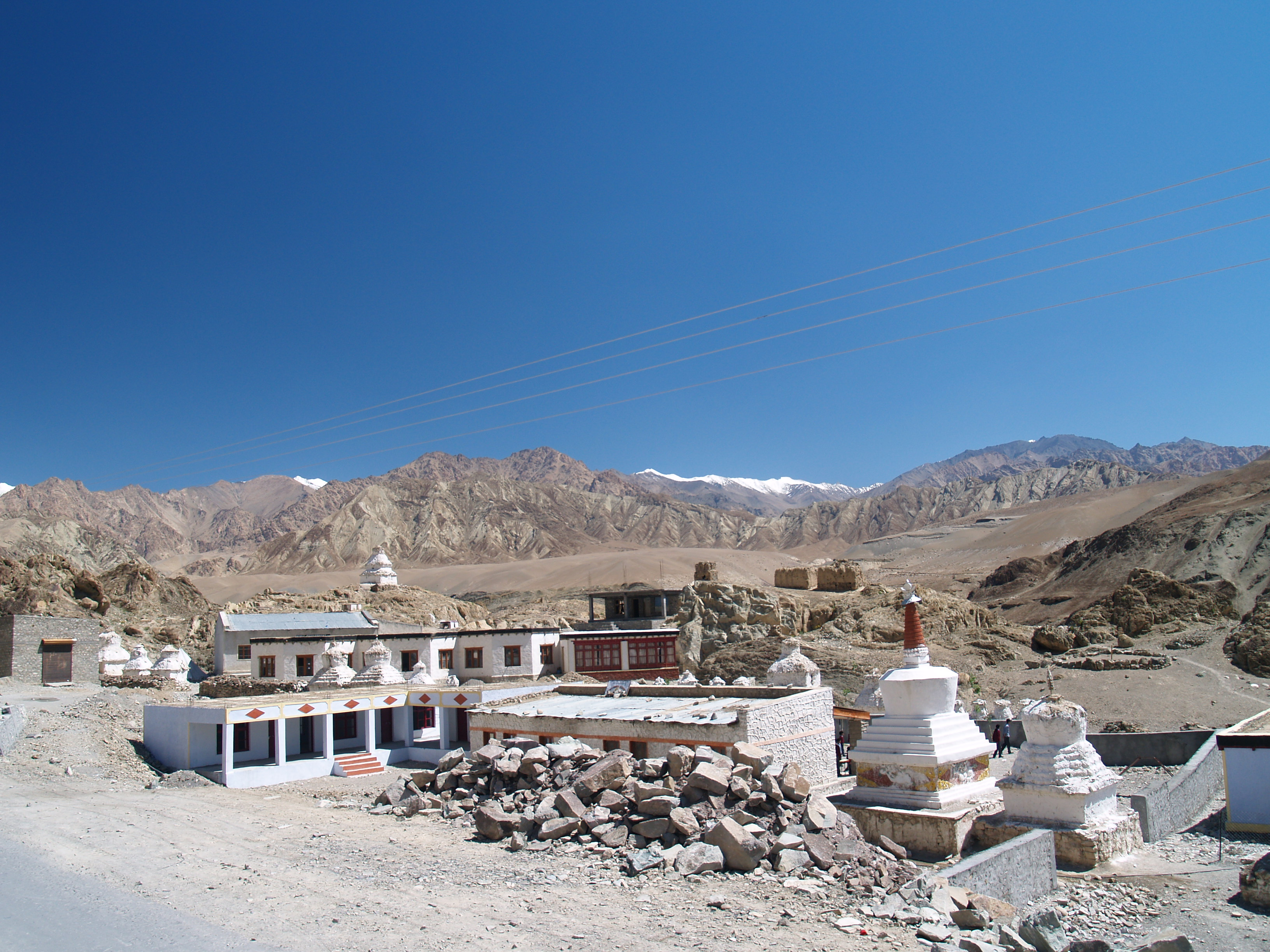
Alchi monastery

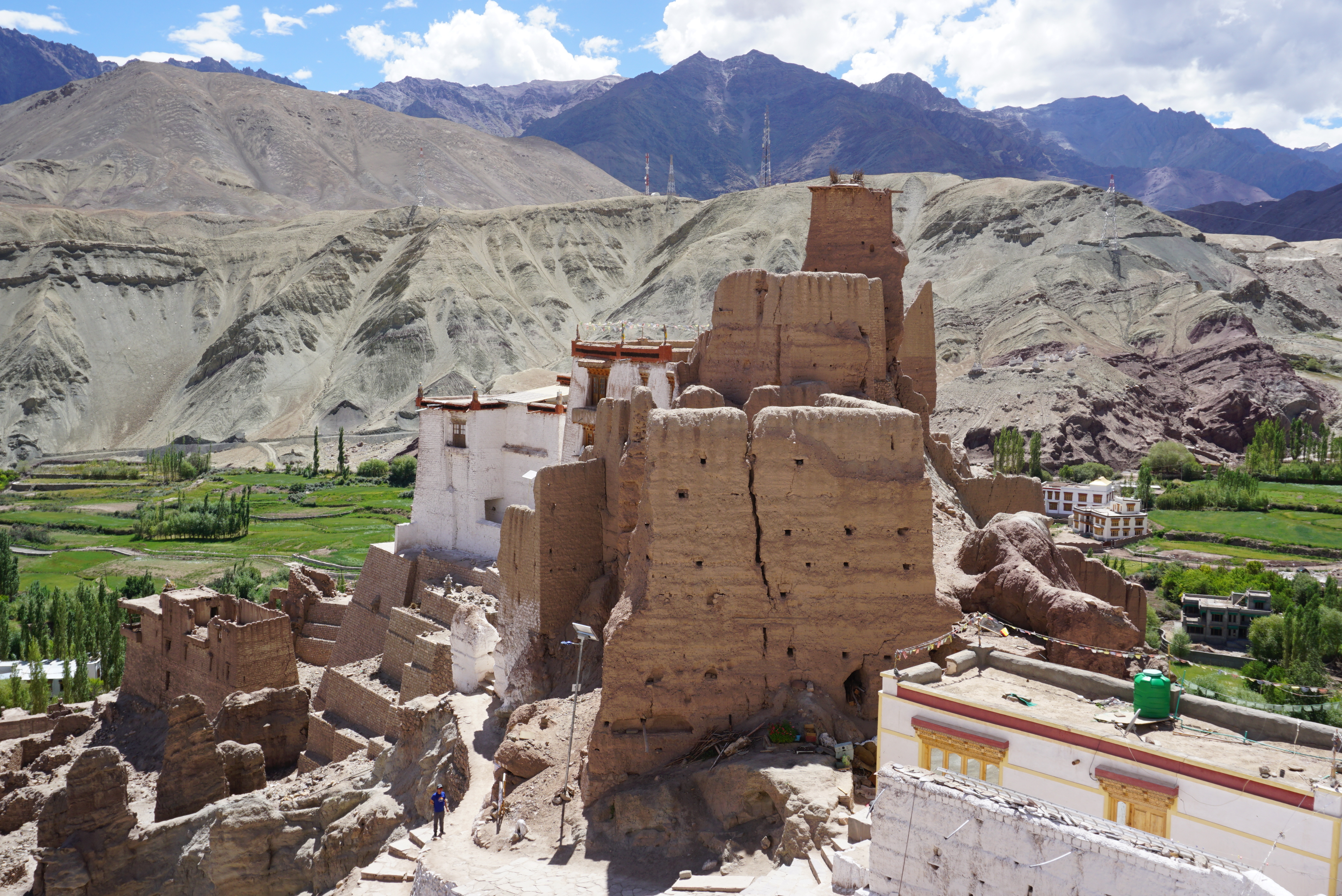
Basgo monastery

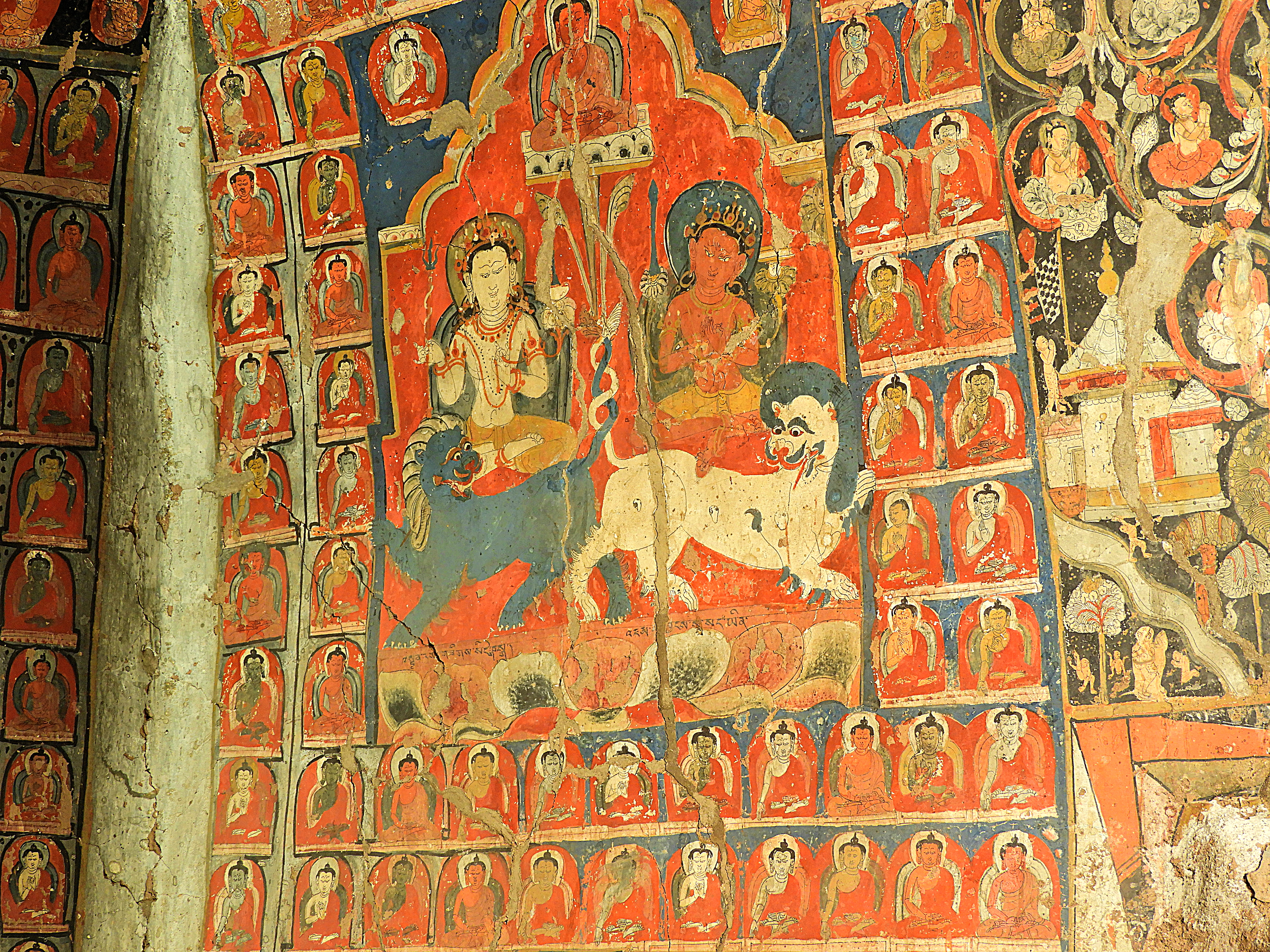
Wall paintings in Saspol caves

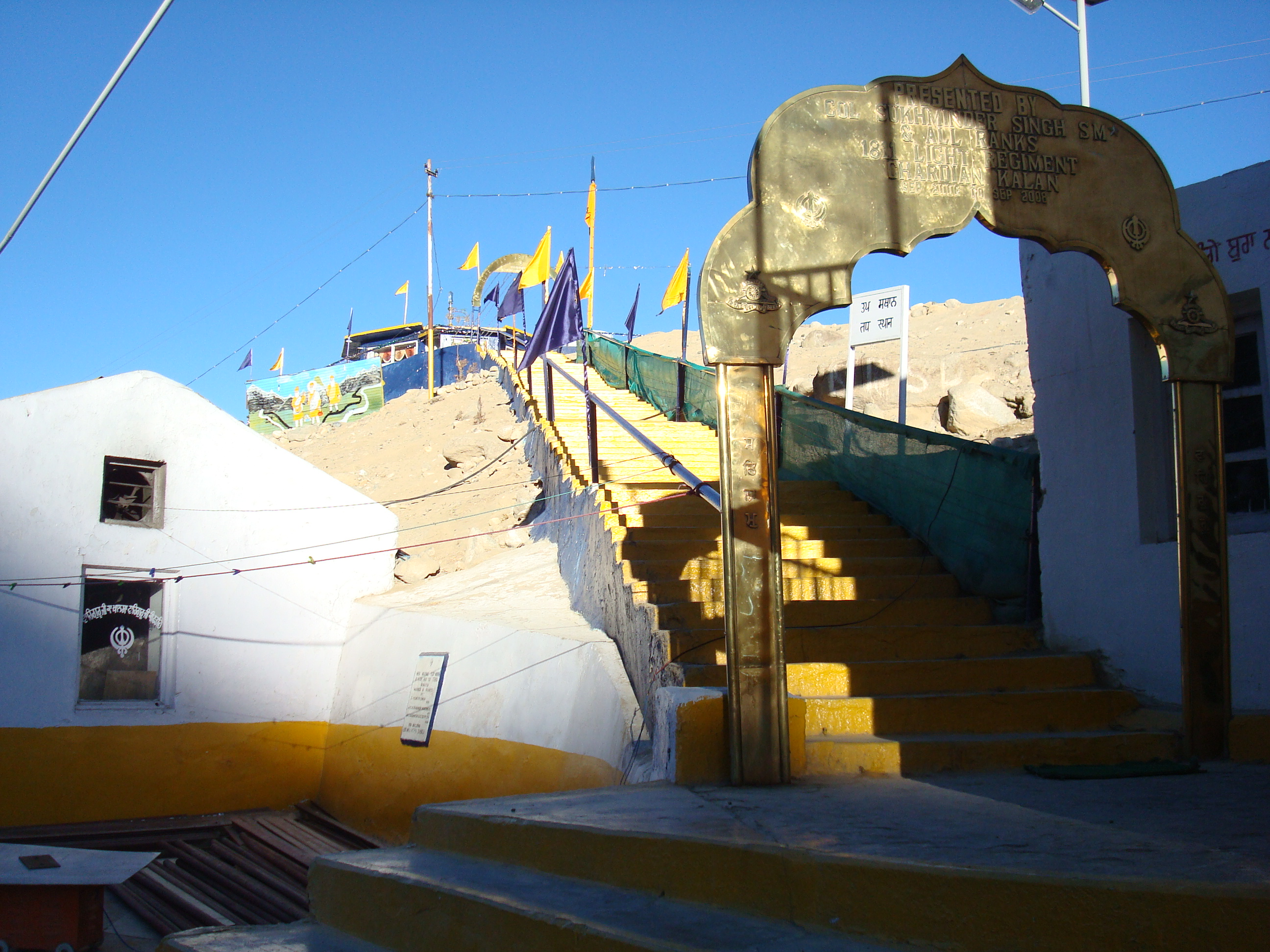
Gurudwara Pathar Sahib

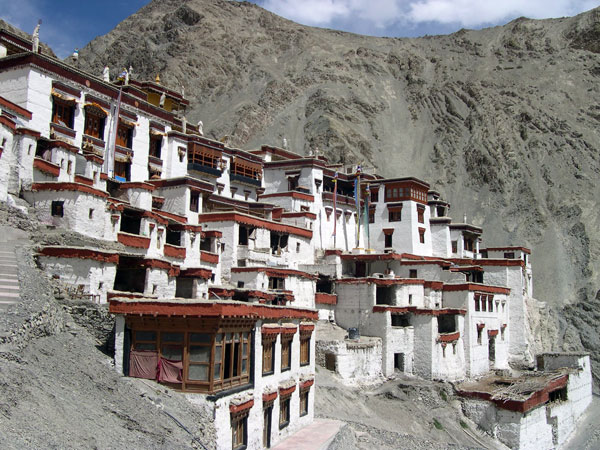
Rizong Gompa

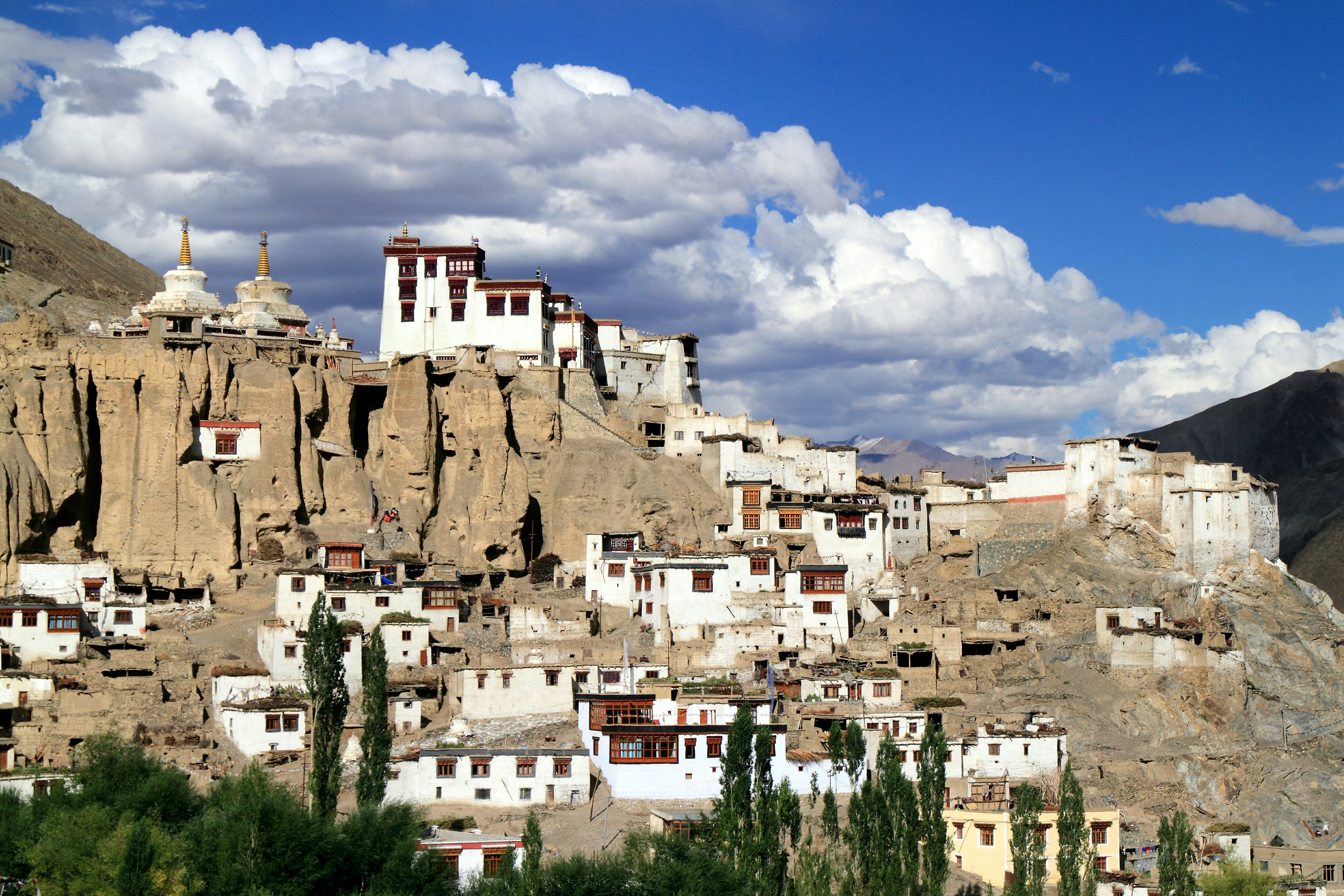
Lamayuru monastery

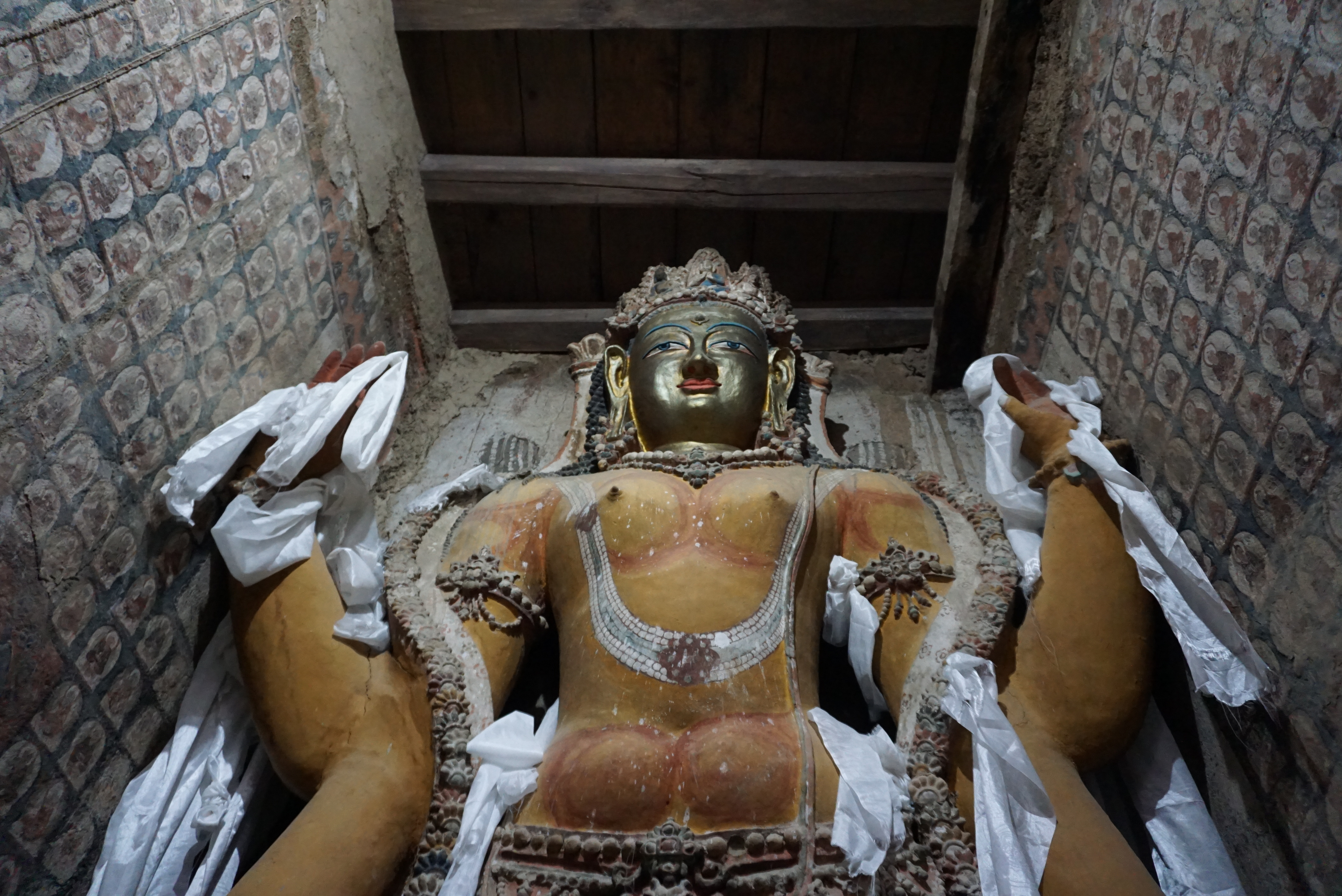
Mangyu temple complex
