= Thathri =

Town and tehsil in Jammu and Kashmir, India

- Town / Tehsil
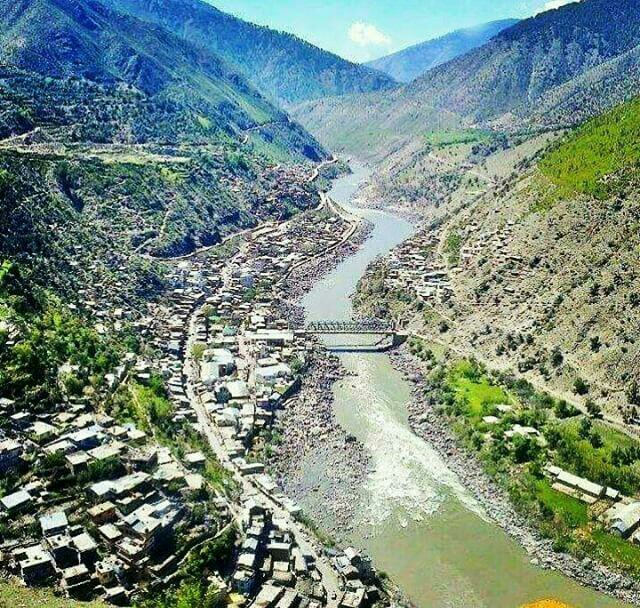
- Thathri Town in 2018

- Location in Jammu and Kashmir, India
- Coordinates: 33°08′43″N 75°47′28″E Thathri in J & K
- Country: India
- Union Territory: Jammu and Kashmir
- Division: Jammu
- Parliamentary Constituency: Udhampur
- District: Doda
- Founded by: Waaz Khan

Area
  - Total: 1.50 km^{2} (0.58 sq mi)
- Elevation: 662 m (2,172 ft)

Population (2011).
  - Total: 59,955
  - Density: 40,000/km^{2} (104,000/sq mi)
  - Male: 31,627
  - Female: 28,328
- Demonym: Thathrian

Languages
  - Official Language: Urdu
  - Spoken: Bhadarwahi, Kashmiri, Gujari, Urdu
- Time zone: UTC+5:30 (IST)
- PIN: 182203
- Vehicle registration: JK06
- Sub-divisional magistrate (SDM): Er. Masood Ahmed Bichoo (JKAS)
- BDC Chairperson: Vacant
- DDC Member: Sandeep Singh Manhas (BJP)
- DySP: Shahid Nahiem Ahmed
- Website: www.thathri.com

Thathri is a town and a notified area committee in Doda district in the Indian union territory of Jammu and Kashmir. It is the sub division and tehsil headquarter of Thathri. Thathri valley is located in the foothills of the Himalayan mountains, about 85 km from Batote. Apart from having ample forests, the town contains many small streams flowing through its various parts. It is located on the banks of the Chenab River and the town area is spread over 1.50 sq. Km².

== Etymology ==
The word Thathri is derived from the Kashmiri word "Thath" (ٹہاٹھ).

The word thathri is derived from 'thath', which locally means a heap of wood or timber collected on the bank of the river Chenab in earlier times. The activities of collection of wood and timber were performed by local people of ancient Thathri (now called Upper Thathri) and from other villages like Tipri, Badanoo, Barshalla, Jangalwar, and Phagsoo. The locals earned their living by working as labourers in the collection of wood in the form of huge heaps of wood and timber, which were later on transported to Jammu by different agencies, both government and private. So the name thathri has its origin from the word 'thath', which could still be narrated today from the records of forest departments and revenue departments. So far as the transportation of wood or timber through Chenab water to the last stop at the bank of the Chenab river at Thathri continued till the construction of the Dool Hasti power project dam. After that, this tradition was discontinued and wood and timber were directly transported through trucks and other vehicles from the source of timber in the present day district of Kishtwar to other parts of Jammu and Kashmir.

== History ==
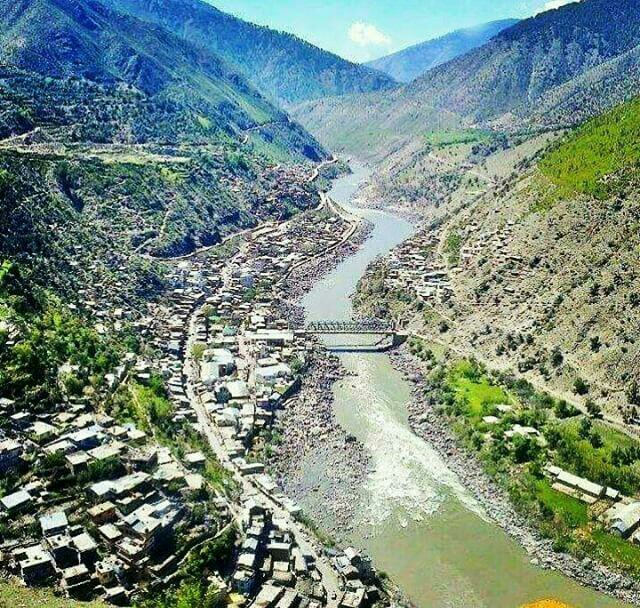
Thathri Town (East to West) in 2019

In ancient times, it was filled with the paddy fields of nearby villagers. As more and more people built their houses in place of these fields and finally it became a village. Over time, the population increased by people coming and settling here from nearby villages and also from places as far as Tral, Baramulla in Kashmir and the people who now settled in Thathri made it a center of business. The reasons for Kashmiri population settling here in the past in 17th or 18th century is matter of ambiguity between historians. However Sumantra Bose says it was repression by feudal class that drew people to the district of Doda. In 2011 the population census reported that Thathri contained at least 93 villages. Thathri was formerly a part of Tehsil Bhadarwah, until it separated as a new Tehsil in 1981. In 2010 Thathri was upgraded to a town. On 23 July 2014 it was upgraded to Subdivision, and is now divided into five Tehsils as Thathri, Phagsoo, Kahara, Chiralla and Bhela. The first municipal elections of Thathri town were held in October 2018.

On 22 July 2017, a flash flood affected Thathri, killing 6 people and washing away 6 homes.

Thathri town, the headquarters of Thathri tehsil, is an underdeveloping town in Doda district of Jammu and Kashmir as of 2019.

Thathri is a historical and commercially important town in the Thathri subdivision. It is located along the left bank of Chenab river and National Highway 244 passes through the town.

On 1 February 2023, Thathri suffered from land subsidence that resulted in 300 people being displaced and 23 homes being declared unsafe; eight days later, another landslide blocked the highway that passes through the town.

As of 2025, demand for district status in Thathri subdivision is increasing with number of arguments with the present district.

As of March 2025, the Jammu and Kashmir administration rejected an immediate proposal by the Chenab Times Foundation to grant Thathri district status, stating no administrative reorganization is currently planned, though future consideration remains possible.

== Location ==
Thathri town is located in the foothills of the Lesser Himalayas, 34 km far from Doda city and 30 km from Kishtwar and Batote-Kishtwar National Highway 244 passes through the town.

Thathri’s urban layout features a network of notable streets that define its residential, cultural, and administrative character. Key routes include Al-Nahr Street, which traces a rain-fed rivulet near R.P. Gate on the National Highway; Al-Bakr Avenue, originating at the historic Abu Bakr Masjid and linking dense residential zones with the circular road; and Chenab Avenue, extending from Eid Gah through central Thathri toward EPS School. Harmony Crescent Street and Falah Street serve major residential and institutional areas, with the latter connecting NH-244 to the Government Degree College. Munawar Avenue reflects local heritage through its association with Master Munawar Din, while the Circular Road forms the town’s primary transport spine along the Chenab River. Silver Colony—popularly known as Court Road—hosts key administrative offices, complemented by nearby Sabil Street, which provides short-route access to civic institutions. Peace Lane, Noble Street, and Riverside Lane contribute to the town’s upper and lower residential connectivity, the last leading to the Government Girls’ Higher Secondary School. Mandir Street highlights the town’s religious diversity as it runs from Mandir Mohalla toward Upper Thathri, and Shanti Noor Street links mixed-use residential areas near Royal Mobile Care with higher neighborhoods, collectively forming the core structure of Thathri’s internal road network.

== Climate ==
Climate data for Thathri, Jammu and Kashmir, India
Month	Jan	Feb	Mar	Apr	May	Jun	Jul	Aug	Sep	Oct	Nov	Dec	Year
Mean daily maximum °C (°F)	7.6 (45.7)	10.7 (51.3)	16.1 (61.0)	21.4 (70.5)	25.5 (77.9)	29.3 (84.7)	30.4 (86.7)	29.8 (85.6)	27.8 (82.0)	22.9 (73.2)	16.3 (61.3)	9.9 (49.8)	20.6 (69.1)
Mean daily minimum °C (°F)	−1.9 (28.6)	0.7 (33.3)	4.1 (39.4)	7.8 (46.0)	11.1 (52.0)	15.2 (59.4)	18.5 (65.3)	17.6 (63.7)	12.9 (55.2)	6.1 (43.0)	1 (34)	−1.3 (29.7)	7.7 (45.8)
Average precipitation mm (inches)	11.8 (0.46)	28.5 (1.12)	39.6 (1.56)	23.3 (0.92)	21 (0.8)	27.3 (1.07)	29.3 (1.15)	29.8 (1.17)	2.5 (0.10)	10.7 (0.42)	9.4 (0.37)	13.4 (0.53)	246.6 (9.67)
Source: World Weather Online

== Demographics ==
The population of Thathri tehsil as of the 2011 census is 59,955, of which 31,627 are men and 28,328 are women, living in 6,797 households spread across a total of 93 villages and 33 panchayats.

According to the 2011 census, the list of villages in Thathri along with their population is shown in the table below:

Name of Villages with Population in Thathri
S. No.	Village	Administrative Division	Population
1	Agrika	Thathri	100.
2	Amrit Garh	Thathri	266.
3	Bachhra	Thathri	205.
4	Badanoo	Thathri	450.
5	Bajah	Thathri	567.
6	Banola	Thathri	530.
7	Barshala	Thathri	1,403.
8	Bathri	Thathri	2,548
9	Bhalara	Thathri	708
10	Bhatola	Kahara (Thathri)	917
11	Bhatoli	Thathri	504
12	Bhella	Thathri	1,657
13	Bolian	Thathri	1,011
14	Botagra	Thathri	1,063
15	Budhi	Thathri	323
16	Chagnu	Thathri	269
17	Chegsu	Thathri	647
18	Chira	Thathri	542
19	Chuteri	Thathri	152
20	Dadian	Thathri	240
21	DaronKerani	Thathri	344
22	Daronjamani	Thathri	287
23	Darori	Thathri	101
24	Dehra	Thathri	200
25	Deyoki	Thathri	567
26	Dhaliah	Thathri	284
27	DharYotha	Thathri	2,096
28	Dichhal	Thathri	608
29	Fagsu(Phagsoo)	Thathri	2,709
30	Galoo	Thathri	399
31	Ghaba	Thathri	704
32	Goela	Kahara (Thathri)	803
33	Gosti	Thathri	1,017
34	Grondra	Thathri	261
35	Gugara	Thathri	731
36	Gurekra	Thathri	385
37	Hagona	Thathri	220
38	Halaran	Kahara (Thathri)	194
39	Hanejo	Thathri	196
40	Herani	Thathri	273
41	HojaBola	Thathri	673
42	Indlu	Thathri	411
43	Indrala	Thathri	868
44	Jagota	Thathri	406
45	Jhandani	Thathri	271
46	Jangalwar	Thathri	623
47	Jasolah	Thathri	122
48	Jhajka	Thathri	161
49	Jia	Kahara (Thathri)	190
50	Joura Kalan	Thathri	939
51	Joura Khurd	Thathri	1,108
52	Kahi Trankal	Thathri	1,049
53	Kahla	Thathri	333
54	Kandote	Thathri	990
55	Kanso	Thathri	475
56	Kathawa	Thathri	687
57	Kawani	Thathri	284
58	Kemega	Thathri	165
59	Kencha	Kahara (Thathri)	754
60	Kolai	Thathri	144
61	KothiBala	Thathri	173
62	KothiPain	Thathri	127
63	Kundi	Thathri	279
64	Kuthiara	Thathri	729
65	Madren	Thathri	75
66	Mahri	Thathri	272
67	Malanu	Kahara (Thathri)	553
68	Malota	Thathri	766
69	Nagni	Thathri	337
70	Nai	Thathri	230
71	Nanadna	Thathri	1,052
72	Natwas	Thathri	94
73	Panthan	Thathri	277
74	Parnot	Thathri	783
75	Pemasa	Thathri	562
76	Piykal	Thathri	448
77	Puneja	Thathri	1,167
78	Ranote	Kahara (Thathri)	371
79	Renkha	Thathri	350
80	RukaliKalan	Thathri	480
81	RukaliKhurd	Thathri	195
82	Sahan	Thathri	288
83	Seesol	Thathri	130
84	Shahrote	Thathri	598
85	Shakla	Thathri	81
86	ShamDalain	Thathri	328
87	Sharni	Thathri	357
88	Shibnote	Thathri	243
89	Sichal	Kahara (Thathri)	1,340
90	Sunarthawa	Thathri	938
91	Suranga	Thathri	502
92	Tanta	Thathri	2,324
93	Thalela	Thathri	2,014
94	Thatri	Thathri	4,938
95	Garh	Thathri	61

== Nearby villages ==
Thathri is the single town in Thathri subdivision of Doda district in the union territory of Jammu and Kashmir in India. It is the main town for the Thathri subdivision and also the Tehsil headquarters. Thathri village promoted as town in 2010. It is approximately 36 km from the district headquarters at Doda. Nearby villages include Zea Abad (0.05 km) Barshala (1.2 km), Sharote (2.5 km), Bagh(0.1 km). Drabshala (5.2 km), Tanta (10.5 km), Premnagar (12 km), and Bhatyass (15 km). The nearest towns are Doda (36 km), Bhaderwah (60 km), Bhalessa (Gandoh) (30.5 km) and Kishtwar (30.3 km).

== Noon chai ==
Noon chai in kashmiri (commonly known in Hindi/Urdu as Namkeen Chai) or Pink Tea is a famous beverage of the people of Thathri. Villagers often start their workdays by sipping a cup of tea at their homes or hotels. Noon Chai (noon means salt, 'chai means tea) is eaten with traditional Kashmiri breads and pastries like lavasa, sheermaal, kandir chot, bakarkhani and kulcha. It is traditionally made from special tea leaves, milk, salt, and cooked in a samavar. A pinch of baking soda is added to help give it more of a pronounced pink color. A recent variant preparation of this tea also includes sugar but it is not traditionally consumed in Thathri.

== Notable people ==
Thathri has been home to several notable figures who have contributed to its cultural and spiritual heritage.

=== Waaz Khan ===
Waaz Khan, born Ali Muhammad in the 1930s in Tral, Jammu and Kashmir, was an Islamic preacher and spiritual leader who played a significant role in the Chenab Valley. He was gifted a small piece of land in Thathri by a local contractor, Maqbool Ahmed. Waaz Khan’s teachings emphasized the Tawhid, moral integrity, and community unity.

=== Taskeen Badanvi ===
Taskeen Badanvi, born Jalal Ud Din, is a poet from Badanoo village in Thathri. He is known for his significant contributions to literature through his poetry in Kashmiri, Bhadarwahi language, and Urdu languages. He has been recognized with several accolades from literary organizations and is affiliated with the Jammu and Kashmir Academy of Art, Culture and Languages.

=== Mangta Sheikh ===
Mangta Sheikh was a contractor and ropeway engineer from Figsoo village, Thathri. He was involved in various infrastructure projects, particularly in the field of ropeway construction, across Jammu & Kashmir, Uttarakhand, and Chandigarh. Sheikh’s career began in his late twenties when he met Austrian engineer Florian Kropivnik, who mentored him. Over time, he contributed to several ropeway projects, including the restoration of the Gulmarg ropeway in 2003. Sheikh received his contractor license from the Public Works Department in 1986 and worked on numerous projects throughout his career. He died in 2024.

== See also ==
- Jamia Masjid Thathri
- Jantroon Dhar
- Doda
- Bunjwah
- Bhalessa
- Gandoh
- Chiralla
- Thathri Disaster 2023
- Thathri–Gandoh National Highway
- Kandi Canal
