= Waaz Khan =

Kashmiri itinerant Islamic preacher in the Chenab Valley

Personal life
- Born: Ali Muhammad; 1930s Tral, Jammu and Kashmir (then princely state of Jammu and Kashmir)
- Died: c. 1990s
- Era: 1960s–1990s
- Region: Chenab Valley, Jammu and Kashmir
- Notable work(s): Grassroots sermons emphasising Tawhid, ethics, and inter-community harmony
- Known for: Itinerant Islamic preaching in the Chenab Valley
- Occupation: Islamic preacher

Religious life
- Religion: Islam
- Denomination: Sunni

Waaz Khan (born Ali Muhammad; 1930s – c. 1990s) was a travelling Islamic preacher from Kashmir, best known for his preaching at a grassroots level across the Chenab Valley (formerly parts of Doda district) in Jammu and Kashmir, India. His sermons focused on Tawhid (the oneness of God) and leading a good/ethical life as a Muslim or in company with one's neighbour, and he is remembered in his local area, as well as by religious and academic authors, for making Quranic principles easier to understand for the rural people in the Valley.

== Early life ==
Reportedly, Ali Muhammad was born in the 1930s in Tral, which was then in the princely state of Jammu and Kashmir and is now located within the borders of the Pulwama district, Jammu and Kashmir, India. Little exists in official archives about his childhood or formal education; one biographical account in a work published on Kashmiri religious leaders mentions Ali Muhammad began speaking in mosques and/or to people in the villages in the 1960s.

=== Preaching and teachings ===
Beginning in the 1960s and on into the following decade and beyond, Waaz Khan travelled between villages in the Chenab Valley, preaching about the basic tenets of Islam, mostly focused on Tawhid, ethical living, and kindness to one's neighbour. He intentionally did not engage in sectarian argumentation or theological disputation and emphasised commonalities across schools of Islamic jurisprudence; crediting him with promoting cooperation among villagers.

=== Association with Thathri ===
As recounted in local histories, while he was residing in the Chenab Valley, a family from Thathri (now part of Doda district) gifted him a small piece of land, evident of his proximity to people there.
