= Gwass-Bagi =

Valley in Himachal Pradesh, India

Gwass valley is a valley in Rohru-Chirgaon in the Indian state of Himachal Pradesh. It includes many villages: Gwass, Sheelapani, Bagi, Kayani, Kaloti, Astani, Bhatwari, Mini.

The village is situated 16 km from Rohru and has a temple for Devta Gwass Kimchhu.
