= Kharahal =

Valley in Himachal Pradesh, India

Kharahal is one of the valleys in Kullu District of Himachal Pradesh, India. It is situated on the left bank of the Bias River. Kharahal is famous for two temples: Bijli Mahadev and Ma Durga.

Kharahal Valley was hit by a cloudburst on 13 September 2010, and property worth millions of dollars was destroyed.

The main source of income for residents is agriculture, specifically harvesting apples in orchards. The main villages in the valley are Puid, Gharakar, Jaipur, Kinja, and Chansari.

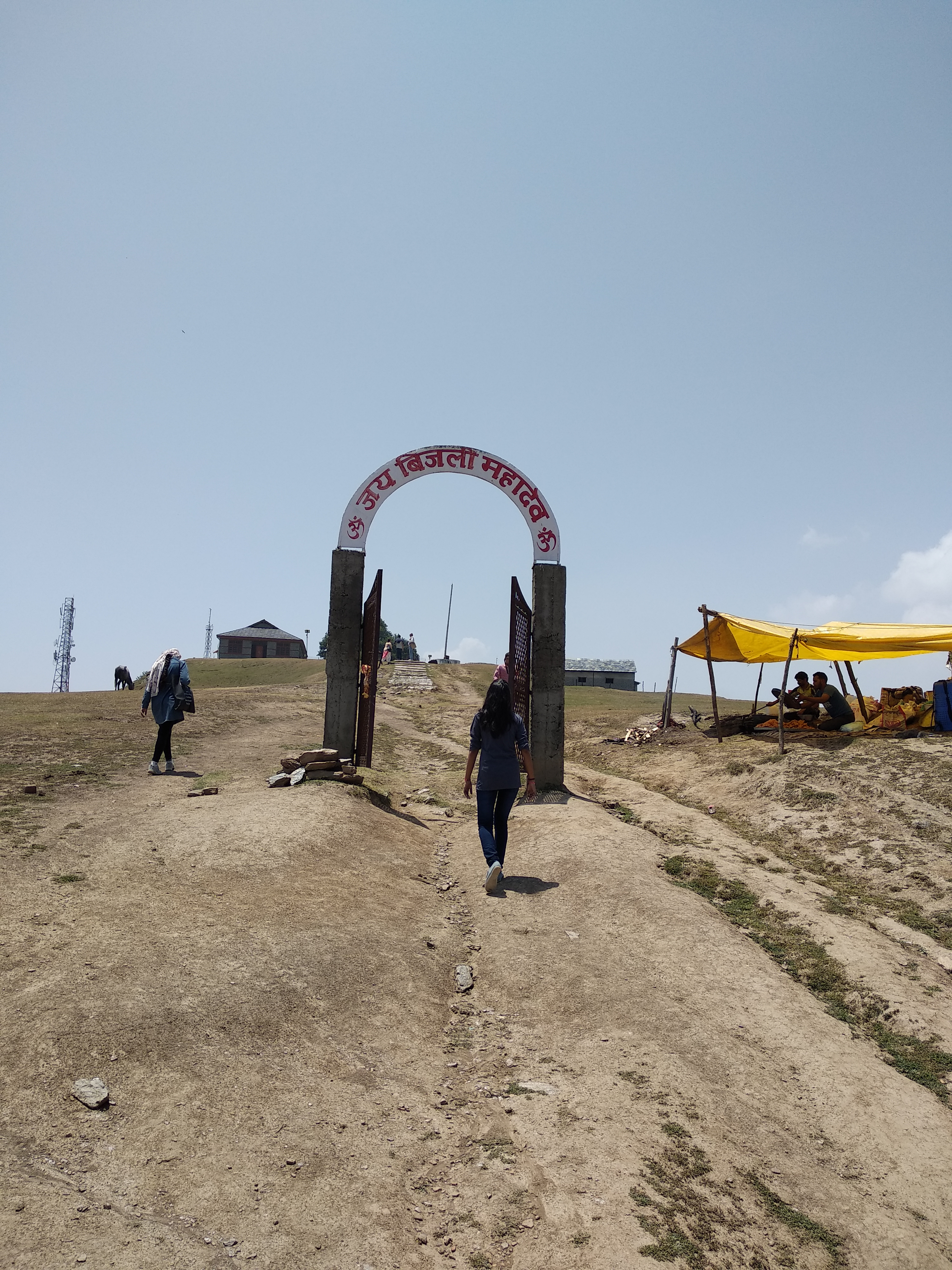
Entrance to temple compound, Bijli Mahadev
