= Dhadkai =

Village in Jammu and Kashmir, India

Dhadkai Dhadkahi
- Village
- Location in Jammu and Kashmir, India Dhadkai (India)
- Coordinates: 33°04′20″N 75°51′13″E
- Country: India
- Union territory: Jammu and Kashmir
- District: Doda
- Tehsil: Gandoh (Bhalessa)

Population (2011)
  - Total: 1,774
- Demonym: Gujjar Muslims
- Time zone: UTC+5:30 (IST)

Dhadkai (also Dhadkahi) is a village in the Doda district of Jammu and Kashmir, India, known as the "Silent Village of India" due to the high prevalence of hearing and speech impairments in the community.

== Location ==
Dhadkai is located in the Gandoh (Bhalessa) Tehsil, approximately 70 kilometers from Doda and 220 kilometers from Jammu.

== Population ==
The village has a population of around 1,774 people, comprising 970 males and 804 females, all of the Gurjar ethnic group.

=== Hearing impairments ===
A significant portion of the population is affected by a congenital disorder that causes severe hearing and speech disabilities. The first reported case of hearing and speech impairment in the village dates back to 1901.

=== Local sign language ===
The villagers use a local sign language to communicate with each other. This language is based on gestures commonly used by the hearing population, facilitating communication between hearing and non-hearing villagers.

=== Genetic basis ===
Research has identified mutations in the OTOF, CLDN14, and SLC26A4 genes as major causes of hearing loss in Dhadkai.
