= Kahara =

- Location within Kenya
- Coordinates: 0.53°S 37.05°E
- Country: Kenya
- County: Nyeri County
- Division: Mukurweini
- Time zone: UTC+3 (EAT)

Kahara is a settlement in Nyeri County, Kenya.

It is part of Mukurweini Constituency. It is connected to Karaba by the 7 kilometres long E555 road

There is a Kahara Medical Clinic
