= Breng Valley =

Valley in Jammu and Kashmir, India

Geography
- Location: Anantnag district, Jammu and Kashmir, India

Breng Valley (The Golden Crown of Kashmir) is located in Anantnag district in the Indian territory of Jammu and Kashmir in the disputed Kashmir region. The valley is named after the rivulet Brengi which is a tributary of famous Jhelum River. The valley spans over 40 km on either side of Brengi and Kokernag is the center of the valley where famous Kokernag Garden is located. The valley has been praised by the Kashmiri Sufi saint Sheikh Noor-u-din Wali as Breng Gov Sonsun Preng, i.e. Breng Valley is a Golden Crown.The breng valley is situated on the banks of river brengi, the right bank tributary of Jhelum. It is surrounded by mountains on all sides that form the part of pir panjal range . The brengi valley provides the routes to wardwan valley in addition to kishtwar via margan top and sinthon top respectively.
