= Kokernag =

Town in Anantnag, Jammu and Kashmir, India

- Sub-District and Town
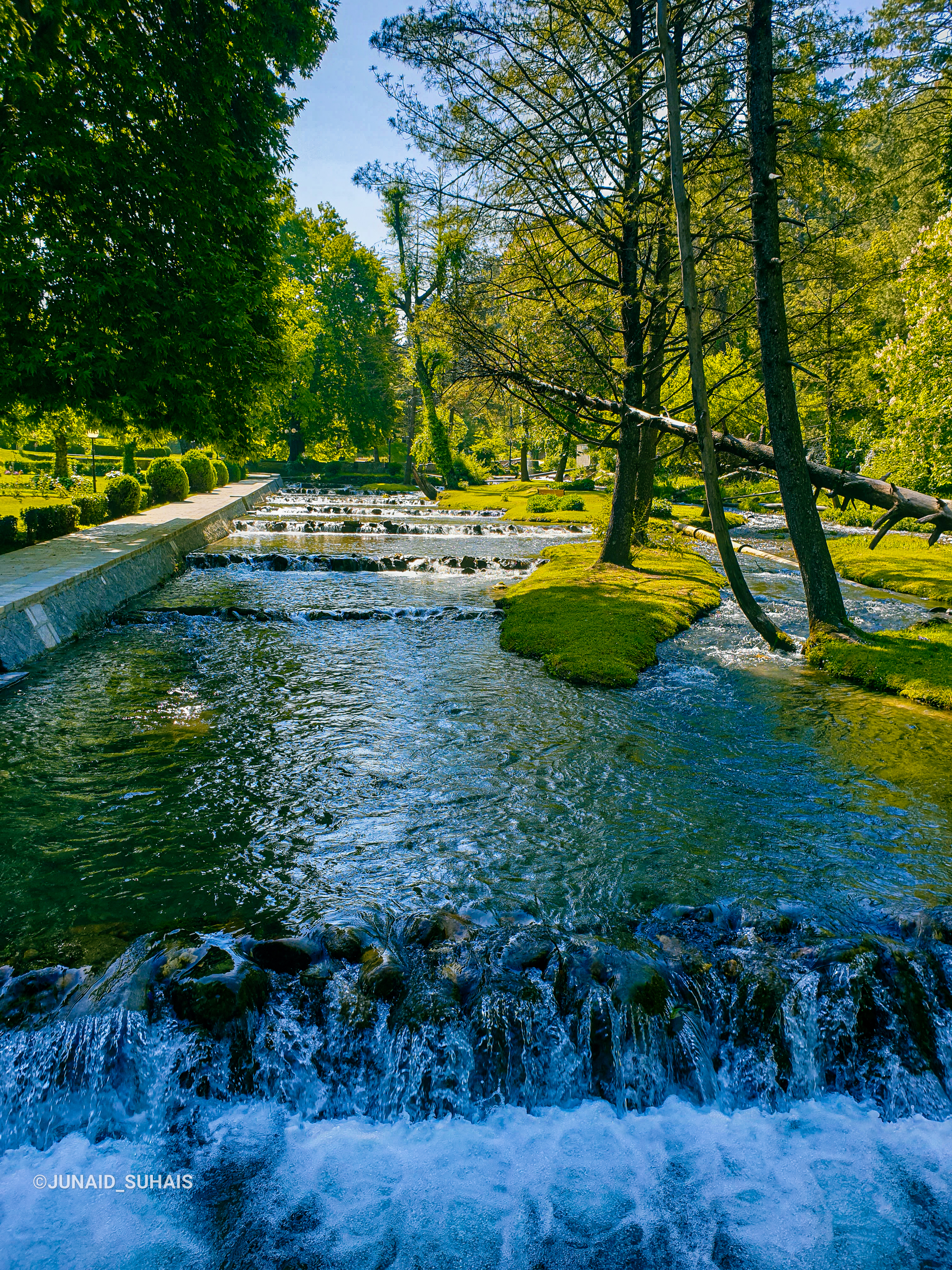
- Kokernag Park

- Location in Jammu and Kashmir, India Kokernag (India)
- Coordinates: 33.584721°N 75.308601°E
- Country: India
- Union Territory: Jammu and Kashmir
- District: Anantnag

Government
  - Type: Parliamentary
  - Body: Municipal
- Elevation: 2,000 m (6,600 ft)

Population (2011)
  - Total: 6,553

Languages
  - Official: Kashmiri, Urdu, Hindi, Dogri, English
- Time zone: UTC+5:30 (IST)
- PIN: 192202
- Vehicle registration: JK-03
- Website: anantnag.nic.in

Kokernag (Urdu pronunciation: [koːkərnɑːɡ] ; Kashmiri pronunciation: [kɔkarnaːɡ]) is a sub-district, town and a notified area committee in the Breng Valley (also known as the Golden Crown of Kashmir) of Anantnag district in the Indian union territory of Jammu and Kashmir in the disputed Kashmir region. The place is known for its botanical gardens, pristine freshwater springs, and rainbow trout farm. It is 25.3 km from Anantnag District via NH244. It is one of the most popular weekend getaways from the state capital of Srinagar.

== Etymology ==
The etymology of the word 'Kokernag' (Kashmiri: کۄکرناگ) is controversial and there are various theories, none of which has any conclusive historical proof. One theory is that the name derives from the two words koker and nag. Koker has been taken from a Kashmiri word for chicken, while nag has been taken from a Sanskrit word for springs. The springs gush out of the base of a thickly wooded hill from where it divides into channels, which resembles the claw-foot of a hen, hence the name. A second theory is that Koker means 'fowl' and nag means 'serpent'. Yet another theory is that the word Kokernag originates from Koh (Mountain) kan (from or under) nag (spring).

Kokernag is known also as Breng Kokernag, the name given by poet and scholar Shiekh ul Alam. He said "kokernag breng chu sunsund preng" which means that "Kokernag is crown of gold". Kokernag is also mentioned in Ain Akbari, wherein it has been mentioned that the water of Kokernag satisfies both hunger and thirst and it is also a remedy for indigestion.

== Geography ==
Kokernag is at an altitude of approximately 2,000 m above sea level. Towns situated around Kokernag are Wangam, Devalgam, Hangalgund, Nagam, Sagam, Zalengam, Magam, and Soaf Shali. The total area of the Kokernag trout farm is about 400 kanals, of which 129 kanals are for gardens and area.

=== Climate ===
Climate data for Kokernag (1991–2020, extremes 1978–2020)
Month	Jan	Feb	Mar	Apr	May	Jun	Jul	Aug	Sep	Oct	Nov	Dec	Year
Record high °C (°F)	17.2 (63.0)	18.4 (65.1)	27.0 (80.6)	28.3 (82.9)	32.6 (90.7)	34.9 (94.8)	33.0 (91.4)	32.0 (89.6)	31.2 (88.2)	29.4 (84.9)	23.4 (74.1)	19.2 (66.6)	34.9 (94.8)
Mean daily maximum °C (°F)	5.5 (41.9)	8.3 (46.9)	14.0 (57.2)	18.9 (66.0)	23.2 (73.8)	26.7 (80.1)	27.6 (81.7)	27.3 (81.1)	25.2 (77.4)	21.0 (69.8)	13.8 (56.8)	8.7 (47.7)	18.3 (64.9)
Mean daily minimum °C (°F)	−3.2 (26.2)	−0.7 (30.7)	3.1 (37.6)	6.7 (44.1)	9.6 (49.3)	13.3 (55.9)	16.0 (60.8)	15.5 (59.9)	11.6 (52.9)	6.8 (44.2)	1.9 (35.4)	−1.6 (29.1)	6.5 (43.7)
Record low °C (°F)	−15.3 (4.5)	−12.3 (9.9)	−6.7 (19.9)	−1.0 (30.2)	−0.3 (31.5)	4.2 (39.6)	8.5 (47.3)	9.1 (48.4)	4.4 (39.9)	−1.8 (28.8)	−5.0 (23.0)	−10.5 (13.1)	−15.3 (4.5)
Average rainfall mm (inches)	99.2 (3.91)	121.3 (4.78)	132.4 (5.21)	121.2 (4.77)	104.5 (4.11)	86.4 (3.40)	85.0 (3.35)	96.9 (3.81)	59.3 (2.33)	32.7 (1.29)	41.0 (1.61)	48.2 (1.90)	1,028 (40.47)
Average rainy days	5.7	7.3	8.7	8.7	8.4	6.3	6.4	7.1	4.5	2.4	2.5	3.4	71.3
Average relative humidity (%) (at 17:30 IST)	77	72	62	58	57	56	65	69	64	60	68	73	65
Source: India Meteorological Department

== Economy ==
It is known for its trout streams and the largest fresh water spring in Kashmir. The trout hatchery department has constructed pools in series in which trout is reared. The Trout Fish Farming Project Kokernag through European Economic Community Assistance was established in 1984 and serves as the mother unit for production of quality rainbow trout and brown trout. Under the extension program of this project, 59 trout rearing units/hatcheries have been established in almost all the districts of the state, including Leh and Kargil. More new trout rearing units are also coming up. The trout is made readily available to the common man at all the rearing units of the department, including a special sale outlet at Gagribal.

The state's first rural mart has been set up in Kokernag to promote and market the handicraft products manufactured by the local women self help groups, by NABARD.

== Demographics ==
Religion in Kokernag Town (2011)
1. Islam (86.1%)
2. Hinduism (13.0%)
3. Christianity (0.43%)
4. Sikhism (0.32%)
5. Not stated (0.12%)

According to the 2011 India census, Kokernag had a population of 6,553. Males constitute 68% of the population and females constitute 32% of the population. Kokernag has an average literacy rate of 63%, higher than the national average of 59.5%. Male literacy is 77%, female literacy is 33%. In Kokernag, 9% of the population is under 6 years of age.

== Transportation ==
=== Road ===
Kokernag is situated at a distance of about 25 km from Anantnag on the right side of NH 244. The easiest and most comfortable means of transportation is to hire a Sumo at Anantnag. One can also catch a local bus that is easily available in Anantnag and head towards Kokernag. It takes about one hour to reach Kokernag.

=== Rail ===
The nearest railway station is Anantnag railway station on the 119 km long Kashmir Railway that runs from Baramulla to Banihal. It lies at a distance of 30 km from Kokernag.

=== Air ===
The nearest airport is Srinagar International Airport, located 85 kilometres from Kokernag.

== See also ==
- Jammu and Kashmir
- Anantnag
- Bijbehara
- Kishtwar
