= Gandoh =

- Sub Division
- Gandoh
- Location in Jammu and Kashmir Gandoh (India)
- Coordinates: 33.03°N 75.90°E
- Country: India
- Union Territory: Jammu and Kashmir
- Division: Jammu
- District: Doda

Population (2011)
  - Total: 71,889

Language
  - Official: Hindi, Urdu, English
  - Others: Kashmiri, Bhalesi, Gojri
- Time zone: UTC+5:30 (IST)
- PIN: 182203
- Vehicle registration: JK-06
- Sub-divisional magistrate: Arun kumar Badyal, JKAS

Gandoh is a tehsil in district Doda of the Indian union territory of Jammu and Kashmir. The village is located on Thathri-Gandoh National Highway.

== See also ==
- Thathri-Gandoh National Highway
- Dhadkai
