= Jangalwar =

Village in Doda, J&K, India

- Village/Tehsil
- Jangalwar
- Location in Jammu and Kashmir, India
- Coordinates: 33.137617°N 75.771334°E
- Country: India
- Union territory: Jammu & Kashmir
- Division: Jammu
- Region: Chenab Valley
- District: Doda

Language
  - Spoken: Kashmiri, Bhaderwahi, Gojri
  - Official: Urdu
- Time zone: UTC+5:30 (IST)
- Pin Code: 182203

Jangalwar is a village and panchayat in the Thathri tehsil of Doda district in the Jammu division of Jammu and Kashmir, India.

== Etymology ==
The word Jangalwar derives from the Urdu word "Jangal", which means forest, and the village is surrounded by forest.

== Location ==
Jangalwar is situated around 7 kilometres from Thathri and 36 kilometres from the district headquarters of Doda.
