= National Highway 244 (India) =

National highway in India

National Highway 244
- Map of National Highway 244 in red

Route information
- Length: 274 km (170 mi)

Major junctions
- From: Batote
- To: Khanbal, Anantnag

Location
- Country: India
- Primary destinations: Sinthan pass – Kishtwar – Thathri – Doda

Highway system
- Roads in India; Expressways; National; State; Asian
← NH 44	→ NH 44

National Highway 244 (NH 244) is a National Highway (also Batote-Kishtwar-Anantnag National Highway) in India. It is located entirely within the union territory of Jammu and Kashmir. It was originally called National Highway 1B.

== Route ==
NH 244 starts at NH44 near Khanabal, Achabal, Kokernag, Daksum, Sinthan pass (Elevation: 3748 m), Kishtwar via Thathri towards Doda till Batote.

== See also ==
- List of national highways in India
