= Jammu–Srinagar National Highway =

Highway in Jammu and Kashmir, India

Jammu–Srinagar National Highway (A segment of NH 44)

Route information
- Maintained by National Highways Authority of India
- Length: 247 km (153 mi)

Major junctions
- From: Lal Chowk, Srinagar district
- To: Jammu, Jammu district

Location
- Country: India
- Major cities: Srinagar, Qazigund, Ramban, Udhampur, Jammu

Highway system
- Roads in India; Expressways; National; State; Asian

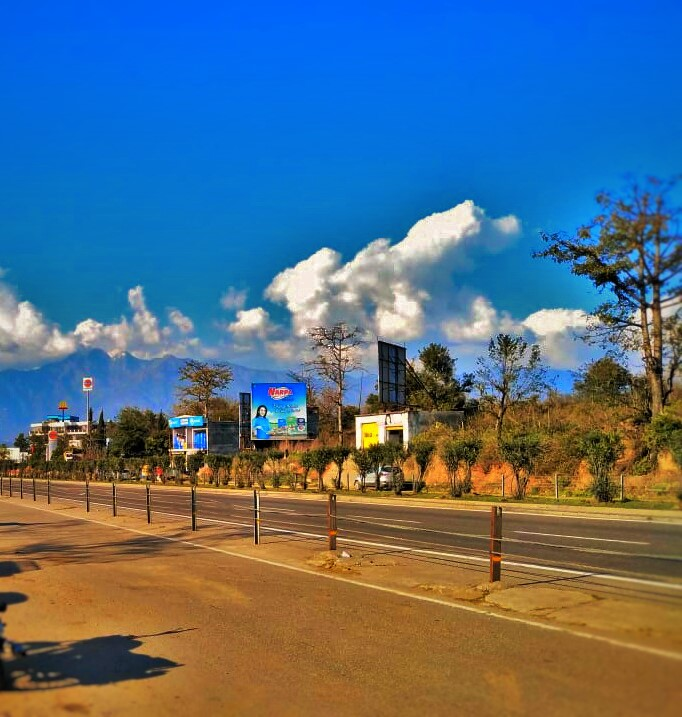
NH44 near Jammu

The Jammu–Srinagar National Highway is the northernmost segment of NH 44 (formerly NH 1A before the renumbering of all national highways). It runs from Srinagar in the Kashmir Valley southward to the city of Jammu.

It is one of the two road links (the other being the Mughal Road) that connects the Kashmir Valley with the rest of India. The traffic on the highway is controlled by two control rooms, one in Srinagar and the other in Jammu.

== Features ==
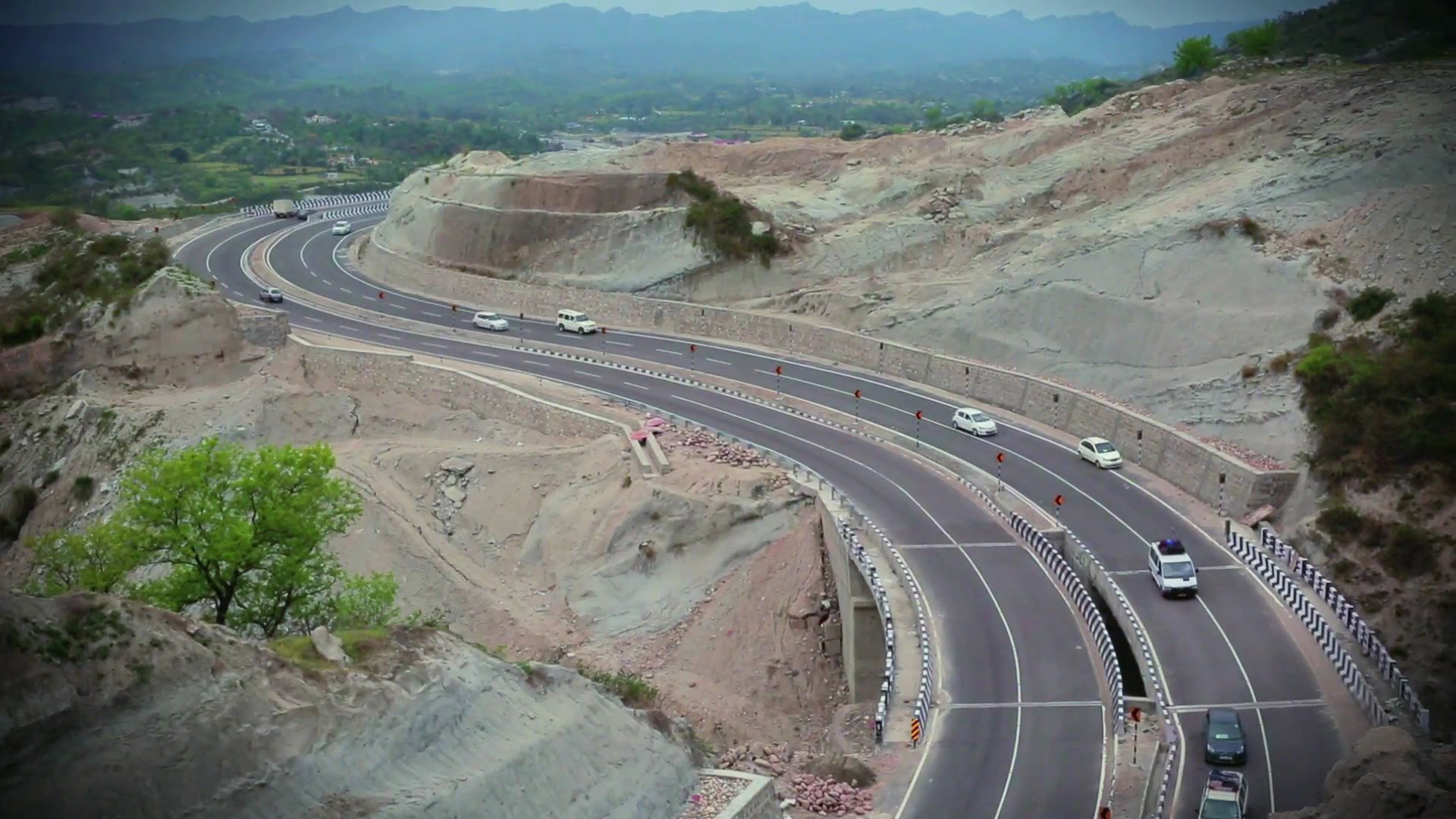
Jammu Srinagar National Highway

The highway starts from Lal Chowk, Srinagar and passes through Pulwama district, Anantnag district, Kulgam district, Ramban district, and Udhampur district, and ends in Jammu city. The highway lies in the Kashmir valley for the first 68 km (up to Qazigund), then passes through a series of mountains up to Udhampur. In the mountains, the highway is often closed for days during winter due to heavy snowfall and the resulting landslides and avalanches.

=== Improvements ===
The government of India maintains and improves the highway. At many sites, new and straighter roadbeds make the journey more comfortable and shorter. Notably, tunnels, such as the Dr. Syama Prasad Mookerjee Tunnel and the Qazigund Road Tunnel have reduced the distance between Jammu and Srinagar (formerly 295 km) by about 40 km and will minimize winter closures.

Notable attractions along the route are the mountaintop park at Patnitop and the town of Kud with its sweets shops that make "desi ghee patisa". These are reached by following the old NH 44 rather than taking the Dr. Syama Prasad Mookerjee Tunnel.

=== Alternatives ===
A railway line runs from Baramulla at the western end of the Kashmir Valley, to the south end of Srinagar, and reaches Qazigund north of the Pir Panjal Range via the Qazigund Railway Tunnel, India's longest railway tunnel, at 11.215 kilometres (6.969 mi). The railway has eased traffic on the highway. The distance between Qazigund, north of the Pir Panjal Range, and Banihal, south of the range, is 35 km by road but only 17 km by railway, and may cut time and costs by three-quarters. From Banihal, there is bus service south to Udhampur and Jammu.

== Traffic control rooms ==
Traffic on the highway is controlled by traffic control rooms in the two capital cities. Personnel at either control room can provide road conditions and give recommendations on the advisability of travel.

- The contact number of Traffic control room Srinagar is 01942450022 and
- The contact number of Traffic control room Jammu is 01942459048.
- The contact number of "Traffic control room Pulwama" is 01933247369.

== Hazards ==
Weather remains a travel hazard. In February 2019, incessant rain caused avalanches and landslides at several points in the mountains. This closed the highway for a week, leading to rationing of petrol and diesel fuel throughout the Kashmir Valley.

When such hazards occur, the control rooms sometimes prevent vehicles from beginning a journey. Vehicles already on the highway might not be able to proceed, or might proceed only in single file or with an escort vehicle. Travelers may have to make spontaneous arrangements for overnight stays.

== See also ==
- NH 44
- Kashmir Valley
- 90 Feet Road
