= Baghu Nallah =

- Village
- Location in Jammu and Kashmir Baghu Nallah (India)
- Coordinates: 33.1205602°N 75.3092928°E
- Country: India
- Union Territory: Jammu and Kashmir
- District: Ramban
- Tehsil: Batote
- Elevation: 2,006 m (6,581 ft)

Population (2001)
  - Total: 3,733

Languages
  - Official: Urdu
- Time zone: UTC+5:30 (IST)
- PIN: 182143

Baghu Nallah is a village located in the Indian union territory of Jammu and Kashmir. The village has a Gurudwara (Sikh Shrine) in the memory of great saints of Jammu and Kashmir, Sant Mela Singh and Sant Rocha Singh. Every year a large number of devotees come here to celebrate in the memory of those great saints.
