= Maitra, Ramban =

Maitra
- Village
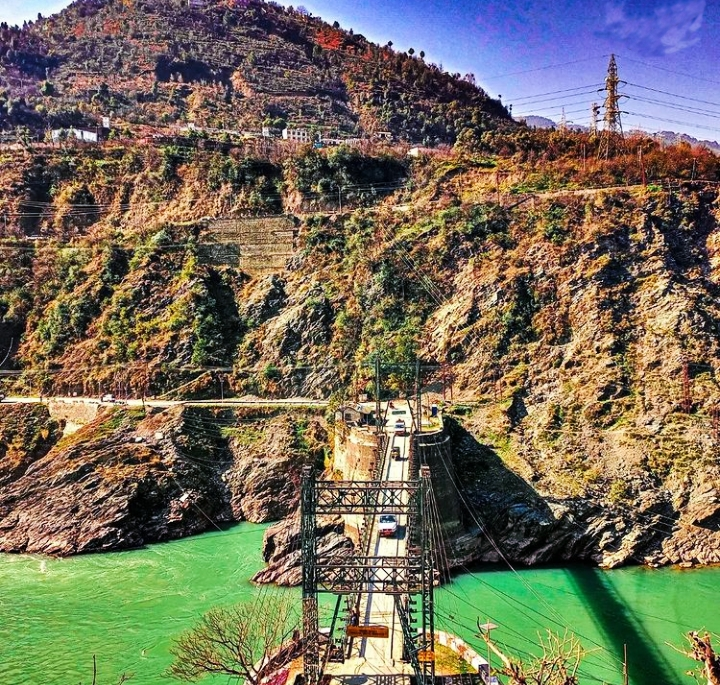
- Maitra

- Location within Jammu and Kashmir Location within India
- Coordinates: 33.23°N 75.23°E
- Country: India
- Union Territory: Jammu and Kashmir
- District: Ramban

Languages
  - Spoken: Pogali, Urdu
- Time zone: UTC+5:30 (IST)
- PIN: 182144

Maitra is a village, near Ramban town in Ramban district in the Indian union territory of Jammu and Kashmir.
