= Chanderkot =

- Village
- Chanderkote
- Location within Jammu and Kashmir Location within India
- Coordinates: 33.1889°N 75.3024°E
- Country: India
- State: Jammu and Kashmir
- District: Ramban

Languages Kashmiri, Shina, Urdu, Hindi, Dogri, English
- Postal code: 182148
- Website: ramban.gov.in

Chanderkot is a village panchayat located in Ramban district in the Indian state of Jammu-Kashmir.

== Geography ==
This village is located on the left bank of River Chenab 8 km from District Headquarters and nearly 125 km from the state capitals Jammu and Sringar. Chanderkote borders on its southeast with Kunfer panchayat.

Chenab acts as a gateway to Chanderkote.

== Demographics ==
The most common languages spoken in the region are Dogri, Urdu, Shina, Hindi, Gujjari, Sarazi, Punjabi, and English.

== Education ==
Government and private schools operate in Chanderkote:

- Government High school chanderkote
- Govt. HS Chanderkote (1951, managed by the Department of Education)
- Kamal Academy High school Chanderkote (1987, English medium, managed privately)
- Govt. Kasturba Gandhi Balika Vidhyalaya Chanderkote (2009, managed by the Department of Education)
- Era international convent
- New Presentation Convent Institute

Government primary schools include, Middle Primary school Chanderkote, PS Kunfer, PS Magdan, PS Bass, and PS Thanadi.

Government Degree College Ramban is 3 km away. A Government Polytechnic college at Chanderkote is under construction.

== Transport ==
=== Road ===
Chanderkote is by road to other places by NH 44.

=== Rail ===
The nearest railway station is Udhampur railway station 45 kilometres away.

=== Air ===
The nearest airport is Jammu Airport and Srinagar airport 125 kilometres away.

== Places ==
=== Gajpat Fort ===
Gajpat Fort is sited on the top of a mountain. Sheikh Abdullah was imprisoned in this fort for a few days. In 1825, Gulab Singh imprisoned Raja Sultan Khan of Bimbar there. Sultan Khan died there and was buried at Chanderkote. In 1858 Mean Hathu Singh, the Governor of Rajouri and close relatives of Maharaja revolted against State Government and tried to kill Maharaja Ranbir Singh. Mean Hathu was arrested and shifted to the fort.

=== Madarsa Faizul Quran ===
Islamic Studies Center with Joint Collab with Bilal Jamia Masjid Kunfer Chanderkote . It is a major religious study center in District Ramban with broad students Sunni Muslims.

=== Imambara ===
Imambara is a major religious place for Shi’a Muslims.

=== Other ===
Other important places include:

- Jamia masjid chanderkote
- Shiv khoo (cave)
- Dargha Hazrat Abbas ع
- Durga mandir
- Amarnath yatri Niwas

== See also ==
- Baglihar Dam
- Nashri chenani tunnel
- Patnitop
- Sanasar
- Qalbi bhai
- Tariq Ahmed Chowdhary
