= Minhas =

Rajput clan

- Jāti: Rajput
- Religions: Hinduism, Islam, Sikhism
- Languages: Punjabi, Dogri
- Country: Pakistan, India
- Region: Punjab, Jammu and Kashmir, Himachal Pradesh
- Ethnicity: Punjabi, Dogra
- Family names: yes
- Lineage: Suryavansha

The Minhas (or Manhas) is a Rajput clan of India and Pakistan. They are found in Punjab, Himachal Pradesh and Jammu and Kashmir. These are spread in most of the part of Gagwan and Jhatgali of district Ramban. It is found in Hindu, Muslim and Sikh communities.

== Notable people ==
Notable people with this surname, who may or may not have a connection to the clan, include:

- Arafat Minhas, a Pakistani cricketer
- Bagicha Singh Minhas, an Indian economist.
- Varinder Singh Minhas, Indian Army officer, recipient of Vir Chakra.
- Deepak Manhas, Indian cricketer
- Dolly Minhas, an Indian actor and model.
- Fahid Minhas, Dutch politician
- Ishaan Singh Manhas, an Indian television and film actor.
- Khudadad Khan, the first Indian soldier to receive a Victoria Cross in the First World War.
- Manjit Minhas, a Canadian entrepreneur and television personality.
- Masud Minhas, an Indian field hockey player.
- Mithun Manhas, an Indian first-class cricketer.
- Muhammed Akbar Khan, the seniormost officer of the Pakistan Army.
- Mushtaq Minhas, a Pakistani politician and former television journalist.
- Raj Manhas, American Educationist.
- Rana Rashid Minhas, Pakistani politician
- Rashid Minhas, the only officer of Pakistan Air Force to receive the Nishan-e-Haider, the highest award for military valour in Pakistan
- Shamsheer Singh Manhas, an Indian politician
- Shandana Minhas, Pakistani writer
- Zaffar Iqbal Manhas, an Indian writer, poet, social activist, and Pahari politician.
