= Devi Das Thakur =

Indian politician

17th Governor of Assam
- In office 2 May 1990 – 17 March 1991
- Preceded by: Anisetti Raghuvir
- Succeeded by: Lokanath Misra

Personal details
- Born: 9 December 1929 Batroo, Pogal Paristan, District Ramban
- Died: 3 February 2007 (aged 77) Tehsil, Pogal Paristan, District Ramban
- Party: Jammu & Kashmir National Conference
- Education: University of Lucknow
- Profession: Jurist

Devi Das Thakur (9 December 1929 – 3 February 2007) was born at small Village Batroo, district Ramban. He was eminent Constitutional Jurist and Practiced Law in the Jammu and Kashmir High Court and also in Supreme Court of India. He also served as Finance and Planning Minister during 1975 to 1982, Deputy Chief Minister during 1984 to 1986 and Governor of Assam and Arunachal Pradesh in the year 1990. former Governor of Assam.

== Early life ==
Thakur was born in the village of Batroo of Tehsil Pogal Paristan (Ukhral), District Ramban, on 9 December 1929 in a Rajput family. Thakur was most notable for his socio-economic amelioration works for the benefit of the people and land of Paristan, Pogal, and Guglidhaar.

During the 1947 tribal invasion, he was a second-year student at Pratap College in Srinagar and trekked about 120 km by foot to reach Batroo. He graduated in economics with a diploma in public administration; he became the first and only graduate in Pogal Paristan in 1950.

He was appointed a headmaster in Government High School, Pogal, in 1951. During this period, he met Shadi Lal Kotwal, an advocate in Ramban, who persuaded him to take higher education in the field of law. Although his father was economically not in a position to send Thakur for higher studies outside of the state, he sent his son to Lucknow in 1952. Thakur completed his Bachelor of Law degree in 1954 at Lucknow University.

His sons Tirath Singh Thakur and Dhiraj Singh Thakur are both judges and former served 43rd Chief Justice of India while later serving as current Chief Justice of Andhra Pradesh High Court.

== Career ==
He started his law practice in Ramban and became a junior to Janardhan Taing at Ramban. After practicing in Ramban for four years, he moved to Jammu in 1959 and started practicing in the Jammu and Kashmir High Court. In March 1973, he was promoted to judge of the High Court. In February 1975, he was inducted as the State Cabinet Minister after resigning as High Court Judge. He remained the Minister for Finance, Planning, Law, Food & Civil Supplies and Transport from 1975 to 1982. As a Minister for Food, Civil Supplies and Transport he tried to bring reform and launch a crusade against "Permit Raj and Dealer Raj".

After resigning as a Cabinet Minister, he moved to Delhi and started his practice in Supreme Court as a senior advocate. He served as Deputy Chief Minister of J&K from 1984 to 1986.

In April 1990, he was appointed Governor of Assam and Arunachal Pradesh. Despite remaining outside his native area for most of his life, he continued to remain associated with the local people of his area.

In 1990, while he was Governor of Assam, the state was hit by ULFA insurgency. Maintaining law and order was a tough and challenging job particularly after 27 November 1990, when President Rule was imposed in Assam. From April 1990 to February 1991, he tried to improve the law and order situation by integrating civil and police administration. He also provided security to the tea cultivators and sent teams of officers at regular intervals into the districts to address civilian concerns. As a Chairman of the Northeast Council, he visited the headquarters of all member states and prepared comprehensive developmental plans after consulting the public representatives and general intelligentsia for balanced regional development. As a constitutional jurist, he was consulted on some important constitutional matters by the Government of India.
