= Dalwah =

Village in Jammu and Kashmir

- Village
- Location in Jammu and Kashmir, India Dalwah (India)
- Coordinates: 33.243250°N 75.056543°E
- Country: India India
- Union Territory: Jammu and Kashmir
- Division: Jammu Division
- Region: Chenab Valley
- District: Ramban
- Tehsil: Gool

Population (2011)
  - Total: 5,431

Language
  - Spokem: Urdu, Kashmiri, Poguli
- Time zone: UTC+5:30 (IST)
- PIN: 182144

Dalwah is a village located in the Gool tehsil of the Ramban district in the Indian-administered union territory of Jammu and Kashmir. It is situated 37 kilometers away from its district headquarters Ramban.

== Geography ==
Dalwah covers a total geographical area of 1164.6 hectares and is positioned at coordinates 33.243250°N, 75.056543°E.

== Demographics ==
According to available data, as of 2011, Dalwah has a total population of 5,431 people. The population is divided into 2,819 males and 2,612 females. The village comprises approximately 1,035 houses. The literacy rate in Dalwah stands at 38.48%, with 48.28% of males and 27.91% of females being literate.

== Recent events ==
In February 2023, Dalwah village was affected by a subsidence incident in the nearby Duksar village. A major chunk of land collapsed, damaging about two dozen houses, including a stretch of the Gool road. This incident left dozens of people homeless and blocked the Sangaldan-Gool road. It occurred shortly after the 2023 Thathri land subsidence in the region.

Experts have suggested that the land sinking observed in Dalwah village of Ramban may be attributed to factors such as water seepage, extensive cutting of steep slopes, and other reasons.

== See also ==
- Ramban district
- Gool
- 2023 Thathri land subsidence
