= Mawalkot =

- Village
- Location within Jammu and Kashmir Location within India
- Coordinates: 33.22°N 75.10°E
- Country: India
- Union Territory: Jammu and Kashmir
- District: Ramban

Population (2011)
  - Total: 1,289

Languages
  - Spoken: Hindi, Urdu
- Time zone: UTC+5:30 (IST)

Mawalkot is a village in Ramban Tehsil of Ramban district in the Indian union territory of Jammu and Kashmir. It has a population of 1289 of which 673 are male and 616 are females.
