= Digdole =

Village in Jammu and Kashmir

- Village
- Location in Jammu and Kashmir, India Digdole (India)
- Coordinates: 33.301977°N 75.180697°E
- Country: India India
- Union Territory: Jammu and Kashmir
- Division: Jammu Division
- Region: Chenab Valley
- District: Ramban
- Tehsil: Ramban

Population (2011)
  - Total: 1,288

Language
  - Spoken: Urdu, Kashmiri Poguli
- Time zone: UTC+5:30 (IST)

Digdole (also Digdol) is a village located in the Ramban district of the Indian-administered union territory of Jammu and Kashmir. It is situated approximately 10 kilometers away from the district headquarters of Ramban.

== Geography ==
Digdole covers a total geographical area of 776.3 hectares and is positioned at coordinates 33.301977°N, 75.180697°E.

== Demographics ==
According to the 2011 census, Digdole has a total population of 1,288 people. Of this population, 704 are males, and 584 are females. The village comprises approximately 224 houses. The literacy rate in Digdole stands at 54.04%, with 67.33% of males and 38.01% of females being literate. The Digdole is prone to landslides and accidents on Jammu-Srinagar National Highway.

== Infrastructure ==
Digdole is connected to nearby areas through a 10-kilometer road stretch, which is notable for its resemblance to an old fortress. There is also an approach road; however, it ends with a 90-degree cliff, effectively leading to nowhere.

== Development projects ==
CEIGALL India Limited is involved in significant infrastructure development in the area, including the construction of a 6.6 km Makarkoot-Silar (Sherbibi) via-duct over Nallah Bishlari valued at Rs 450 crores including GST and a two-tube Digdol-Khooni Nallah tunnel measuring 6.2 kilometers valued at Rs 800 crores without GST. These projects are expected to enhance connectivity in the region.

The National Highways Authority of India (NHAI) has also proposed the construction of two tubes measuring a total of 16.6 kilometers between Ramban and Digdol, extending up to Sher Bibi, and connecting it with a viaduct as part of the Banihal expressway project.
