= Badshah Khan (wrestler) =

Indian professional wrestler

Personal information
- Born: Arif Saleem Bohru; 1998 (age 27–28) Ramban, Jammu and Kashmir, India

Professional wrestling career
- Ring name: Badshah Khan
- Billed height: 6 ft 2 in (1.88 m)
- Billed weight: 105 kg (231 lb; 16 st 7 lb)
- Billed from: Jalandhar, Punjab, India
- Trained by: Dalip Singh Rana
- Debut: 2016

Arif Saleem Bohru, better known by his ring name Badshah Khan, is an Indian professional wrestler and the first one to be from the Jammu and Kashmir region of India. He is often considered among the top five wrestlers in India.

He has worked in The Great Khali's Continental Wrestling Entertainment where he is the current CWE World Heavyweight Champion. In 2021, Arif is expected to take part in the WWE India tryouts at Mumbai.

== Early life ==
Arif Saleem Bohru was born and raised in Neel, Ramban district, Jammu and Kashmir, India. His father, Muhammad Saleem Bohru, is a CRPF sub-inspector.

== Professional wrestling career ==
=== First wrestler from Jammu and Kashmir ===
Badshah Khan became the first professional wrestler from Jammu and Kashmir. He is also the first person from Jammu and Kashmir to train under The Great Khali at CWE academy in Jalandhar.

=== Continental Wrestling Entertainment (2016-present) ===
In 2016, Arif Bohru entered wrestling through the promotion from The Great Khali's Continental Wrestling Entertainment. Arif began his training as a professional wrestler. In 2016, Arif Bohru made his wrestling debut under the ring name "Badshah Khan" given to him by The Great Khali. Arif won the Tag Team Championship twice. On 18 March 2018, he won his first CWE World Heavyweight Championship. In 2021, Khan is set to debut in the World Wrestling Entertainment (WWE).
