= Kud (disambiguation) =

Kud is a town in Udhampur district, Jammu and Kashmir.

Kud or KUD may also refer to:

- KUD, IATA code for Kudat Airport in Sabah, Malaysia
- kud, ISO 639-3 code for the ʼAuhelawa language of Papua New Guinea
