= T. S. Thakur =

43rd Chief Justice of India

Tirath Singh Thakur
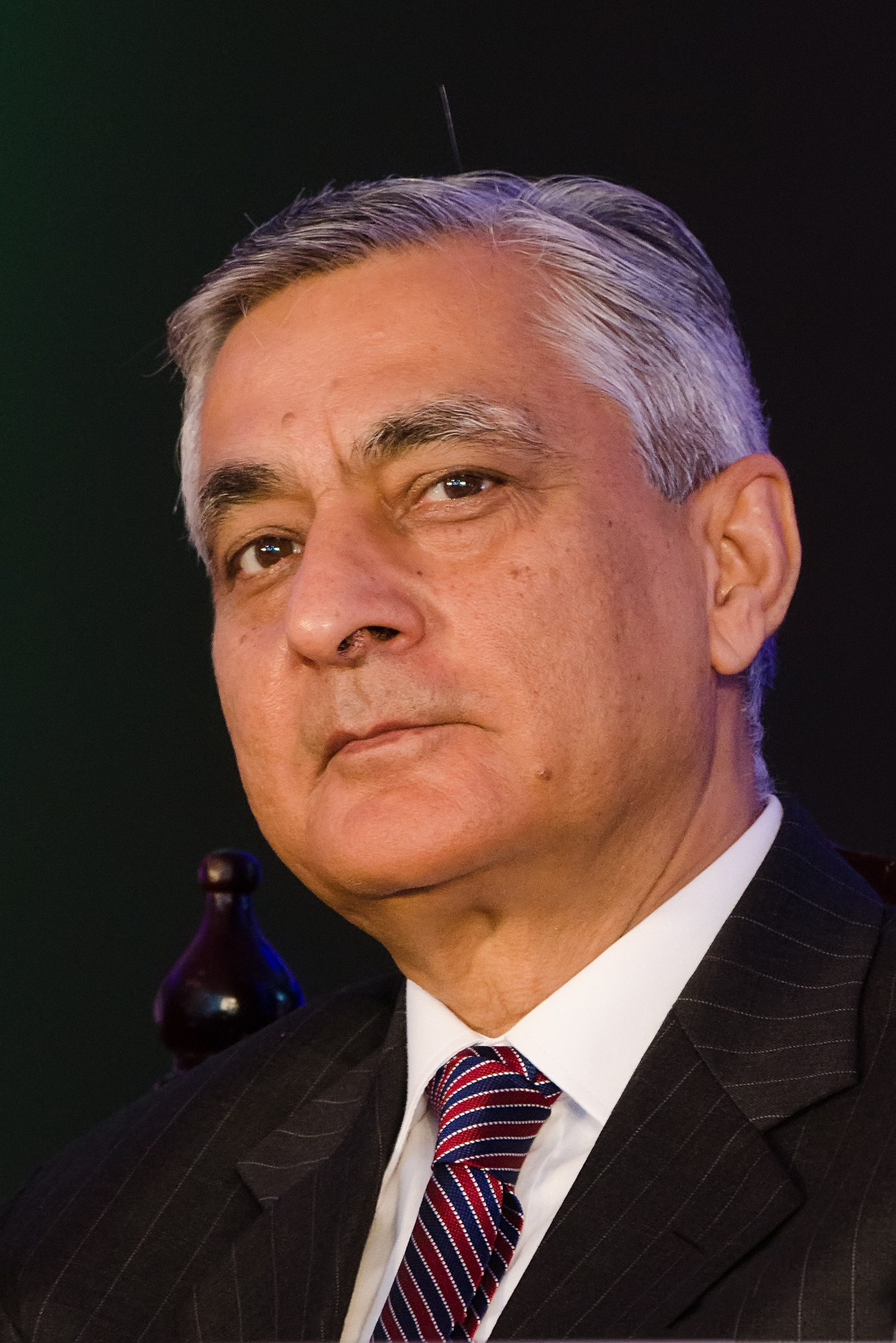
- Justice T. S. Thakur

43rd Chief Justice of India
- In office 3 December 2015 – 4 January 2017
- Appointed by: Pranab Mukherjee
- Preceded by: H. L. Dattu
- Succeeded by: Jagdish Singh Khehar

Judge of the Supreme Court of India
- In office 17 November 2009 – 2 December 2015
- Nominated by: K. G. Balakrishnan
- Appointed by: Pratibha Patil

28th Chief Justice of the Punjab and Haryana High Court
- In office 11 August 2008 – 16 November 2009
- Nominated by: K. G. Balakrishnan
- Appointed by: Pratibha Patil
- Preceded by: Vijender Jain
- Succeeded by: Mukul Mudgal

Judge of the Delhi High Court
- In office 9 July 2004 – 10 August 2008
- Nominated by: Ramesh Chandra Lahoti
- Appointed by: A. P. J. Abdul Kalam

Judge of the Karnataka High Court
- In office 5 March 1994 – 8 July 2004
- Nominated by: M. N. Venkatachaliah
- Appointed by: Shankar Dayal Sharma

Judge of the Jammu and Kashmir High Court
- In office 16 February 1994 – 4 March 1994
- Nominated by: M. N. Venkatachaliah
- Appointed by: Shankar Dayal Sharma

Personal details
- Born: 4 January 1952 (age 74) Pogal Paristan Jammu and Kashmir, India
- Relations: Dhiraj Singh Thakur (Brother)
- Parent: Devi Das Thakur
- Education: BSc, LLB
- Alma mater: Jammu University, Govt. Gandhi Memorial Science College
- Website: Supreme Court of India

Tirath Singh Thakur (born 4 January 1952) is an Indian jurist who served as the 43rd Chief Justice of India (CJI) from 3 December 2015 to 4 January 2017. Before being elevated to the Supreme Court, he served as the Chief Justice of Punjab and Haryana High Court from August 2008 to November 2009 .He has also served as a senior judge in Karnataka High Court from March 1994 to July 2004 and Jammu and Kashmir High Court from February to March 1994.

== Early life and education ==
Thakur graduated from Govt. Gandhi Memorial Science College and completed law from Department of Law Jammu University.

== Career ==
Tirath Singh Thakur enrolled as a pleader in October 1972 and joined the chamber of his father Late Shri Devi Das Thakur, former governor of Assam a leading advocate and later, a judge of High Court of J & K. Justice T. S. Thakur practised in civil, criminal, constitutional, taxation and service matters in the High Court of Jammu & Kashmir.

He was designated as a senior advocate in 1990. He was appointed an additional judge of the High Court of J & K on 16 February 1994 and transferred as judge of the High Court of Karnataka in March 1994. He was appointed a permanent judge in September 1995. He was transferred as a judge of the High Court of Delhi in July 2004.

He was appointed acting chief justice of the Delhi High Court on 9 April 2008 and took over as the chief justice of the High Court of Punjab and Haryana on 11 August 2008. He was elevated as a judge of the Supreme Court and assumed charge on 17 November 2009.

His brother Dhiraj Singh Thakur is also a judge and currently serving as Chief Justice of Andhra Pradesh High Court.

=== Chief Justice of India ===
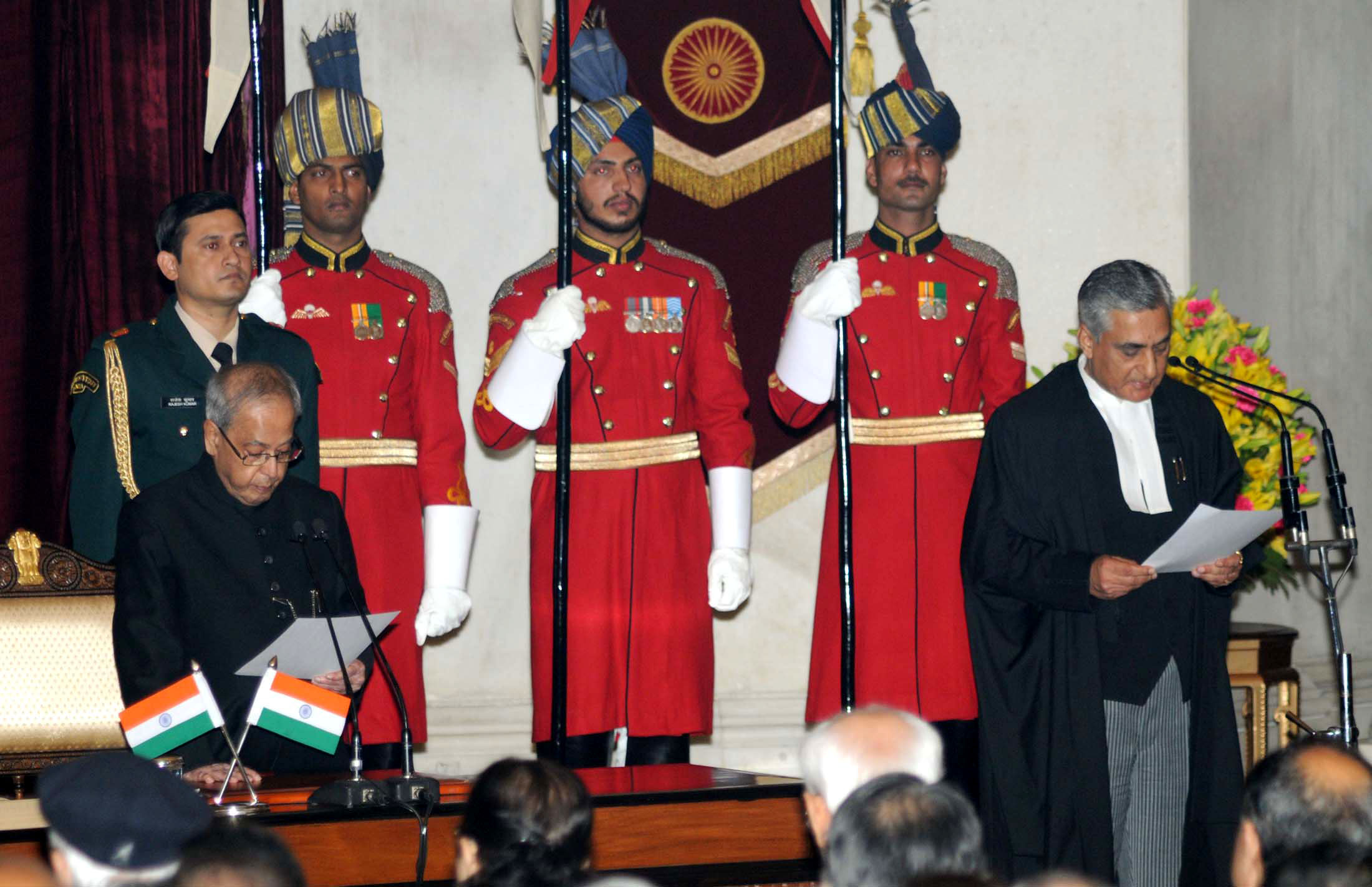
President Pranab Mukherjee administering the oath of office of Chief Justice of India to Justice Thakur, at Rashtrapati Bhavan, in New Delhi on 3 December 2015

He was appointed Chief Justice of India on 18 November 2015 assuming office on 3 December 2015, succeeding Justice H. L. Dattu who retired as CJI on 2 December 2015, on turning 65 years of age. He was sworn in by President Pranab Mukherjee. He retired on 4 January 2017 after reaching age 65 and was succeeded by the country's first Chief Justice of India from Sikh community Jagdish Singh Khehar.

In April 2016, he lamented the inaction by the government in increasing the number of judges.
