= Sangaldan =

Gool Sangaldan
- Town
- Location in Jammu and Kashmir, India Gool Sangaldan (India)
- Coordinates: 33.24°N 75.09°E
- Country: India
- Union Territory: Jammu and Kashmir
- District: Ramban
- Region: Chenab Valley
- Elevation: 1,383 m (4,537 ft)

Population (2011)
  - Total: 876

Languages
  - Official Spoken: Urdu, Kashmiri
  - Other Spoken: Gojri,
- Time zone: UTC+5:30 (IST)
- Pincode: 182144
- Vehicle registration: JK19
- Website: ramban.gov.in

Sangaldan is a town near Ramban town in the Ramban district of the Indian union territory of Jammu and Kashmir. It falls in the Gool-Gulabgarh.

== Sangaldan railway station ==
Sangaldan railway station is a railway station in the Ramban district, Jammu and Kashmir. Its code is SNGDN and will serve Sangaldan city. The station includes two platforms. The station lies on the Banihal - Katra rail line.

== Government ==
Dr. Shamshada Shan was elected Chairperson of District Development Council Ramban in 2021. She was previously elected as the District Development Council Member from the Sangaldan constituency in 2020.

Rabiya Beigh was elected as her deputy.

Navida Begum was elected Block Development Council Chairperson in 2019.

== Geography ==
=== Tata Pani (Hot Spring) ===
Tata Pani is a hot water spring located at Sangaldan in Ramban district and is deemed by Kashmir-based people best cure skin and bone diseases. People from various areas of Kashmir especially from Kulgam and Anantnag districts, came for having a bath in the spring for curing the diseases in July and August months.

This place is famous for the sulphur spring whose water is believed to have miraculous healing powers. It is located about 45 km (28 mi) from Ramban town. Thousands of people throng the place from June to ending November every year from within and outside the state particularly from neighbouring Punjab state to take a dip in these revered springs to get rid themselves of ailments, particularly Dermatitis and Arthritis.

== Demographics ==
In the 2011 census it had a population of 876 people in 476 households. The female population is 47.4%. The village literacy rate is 54.9% and the female literacy rate is 21.9%.

| Census Parameter | Census Data |
|---|---|
| Total Population | 876 |
| Total No. of Houses | 476 |
| Female Population % | 47.4% (415) |
| Total Literacy rate % | 54.9% (481) |
| Female Literacy rate | 21.9% (192) |
| Scheduled Tribes Population % | 2.2% (19) |
| Scheduled Caste Population % | 0.5% (4) |
| Working Population % | 25.6% |
| Child (0-6) Population by 2011 | 166 |
| Girl Child (0-6) Population % by 2011 | 47.6% (79) |

== Geography ==
Sangaldan is 35 km (22 mi) from District Headquarter Ramban, which is the nearest Statutory Town is Ramban, 35 km (22 mi) away. Forest covers 134.4 hectares, the non-agricultural area is 10.5 hectares, and total irrigated area is 24.3 hectares.

== Education ==
Private and government private, middle and secondary schools are available. The nearest government arts and science degree college and government ITI colleges are in Ramban. The nearest government disabled school, government engineering college, government medical college, government MBA college and government polytechnic college are in Jammu.

=== Colleges ===
- Government degree college Gool

=== Schools ===
- GHSS Sangaldan
- Diamond Public School, Sangaldan
- G.M.A Sangaldan
- GMS Sangaldan
- GHSS Dalwah
- Prince Valley Public School Kantha
- Blooming Flowers Dalwah

== Infrastructure ==
=== Health ===
One primary health care centre, one veterinary hospital, and four medical shops are available, including Naik Medical hall Chandail Morh Dalwah (Nawaz Naik)

operate there.

=== Drinking water and sanitation ===
Nonpotable water is available all year round. A hand pump is the drinking water source. No drainage system is available. No system to collects garbage. Drain water is discharged directly into water bodies.

=== Communication and media ===
A sub post office is available. Mobile coverage is available. The nearest Internet Centre is 10 km (6.2 mi) away. The nearest private courier facility is 10 km (6.2 mi) away.

=== Electricity ===
This village has a power supply with a 14-hour power window in summer, and about 8-hours in winter. Ten hours of agricultural power supply in summer and twelve hours in winter are available.

=== Other ===
Anganwadi centre and polling station are there.

== Economy ==
J&K Bank and an ATM are available.

Maize, rice, potatoes and beans are agricultural commodities. Total irrigated area in this village is 24.3 hectares from canals. Carpets are handicrafts made there.

== See also ==
- Sangaldan Railway Station
- Banihal
