= Chenani =

- Town
- Location in Jammu and Kashmir Chenani (India)
- Coordinates: 33.035°N 75.276°E
- Country: India
- Union Territory: Jammu and Kashmir
- District: Udhampur
- Tehsil: Chenani
- Elevation: 1,062 m (3,484 ft)

Population (2011)
  - Total: 2,620

Demographics
  - Literacy: 88.91%
  - Sex ratio: 809 ♀/ 1000 ♂

Languages
  - Official: Dogri, English, Hindi, Kashmiri, Urdu
  - Regional: Dogri
- Time zone: UTC+5:30 (IST)
- PIN: 182141
- Telephone code: 01992
- Vehicle registration: JK-14
- Website: udhampur.nic.in

Chanani or Chenani is a town and tehsil in the Udhampur district, in the Indian union territory of Jammu and Kashmir in the disputed Kashmir region. It is governed by a notified area council (city council). Before 1947, it was an internal jagir ruled by a Chandel (Rajput) ruler in the princely state of Jammu and Kashmir. This Town has further gained importance after getting the Asia's longest tunnel from chenani to nasari.

== History ==
Until 1947, Chenani principality was ruled by a Rajput clan (Anthal), Chandel Rajputs who came to this place in the 7th century AD from Kot Kalhur, Bilaspur Himachal Pradesh. Natives of this region approached Raja Bir Chand of Bilaspur and requested that he save them from the atrocities of local Ranas. Raja Bir Chand sent his younger brother Raja Gambhir Chand. (A Chandel Rajput ruler) along with an army to help the natives. On reaching Chenani, Raja Gambhir Chand made the Ranas leave the place and established an independent State which continued till 1947. During this period 52 Rajas of this clan of Rajputs ruled this erstwhile princely state.

== Geography ==
Chenani is located at 33.03°N 75.28°E at a distance of 90 km north-east of Jammu city. It has an average elevation of 1,062 metres (3,487 feet). River Tawi flows through Chenani town. It is connected well by road. NH 1A which connects Kashmir to the rest of the country passes through Chenani. Buses from Jammu take about 2 to 3 hours to reach Chenani. Mini-buses are also available for Chenani from Udhampur. The nearest railway station from Chenani in Udhampur, 25 km away. Chenani is the gateway to famous Sudhmahadev, Gourikund and Mantalai shrines that can be reached by bus or taxi from Chenani.

== Demographics ==
Religion in Chenani Town (2011)
1. Hinduism (75.9%)
2. Islam (21.7%)
3. Sikhism (2.06%)
4. Christianity (0.27%)
5. Buddhism (0.08%)

According to the 2011 Census of India, Chenani Town had a population of 2,620, with 1,448 males and 1,172 females. The literacy rate in Chenani town is 88.91% with male literacy of 94.43% and female literacy of 82.19%. 12% of the population is under 6 years of age.

=== Religion ===
Hinduism is the largest religion in Chenani with over 75% followers. Islam is followed by over 21% of people. The rest are followers of Sikhism with 2.06% adherents, Christianity with 0.27% followers and Buddhism with 0.08& followers.

== Transportation ==
=== Air ===
The nearest airport to Chenani is Jammu Airport, located 97 kilometres from Chenani.

=== Rail ===
There is no railway connectivity to Chenani. The nearest railway station is Udhampur railway station which is 30 kilometres from Chenani.

=== Road ===
Chenani is well-connected with other places in Jammu and Kashmir and India by the Jammu–Srinagar National Highway or the NH 44 alongside other intra-district roads. The Dr. Syama Prasad Mookerjee Tunnel or Chenani–Nashri tunnel is a 9.2 km long tunnel bypassing Patnitop. When completed, the NH 44 will be re-routed through this tunnel. The tunnel will reduce the length of the highway by 31 km between Jammu and Srinagar. India's longest road tunnel, the 9.2 km long tunnel is about 2 km from Chenani town. It will also reduce traffic jams on NH44 that occurred due to snowfall and avalanches in winter at Patnitop.

== See also ==
- Jammu and Kashmir
- Patnitop
- Jammu Airport
- Sanasar
- Bhaderwah
