= Dr. Syama Prasad Mookerjee Tunnel =

Road tunnel in Jammu and Kashmir, India

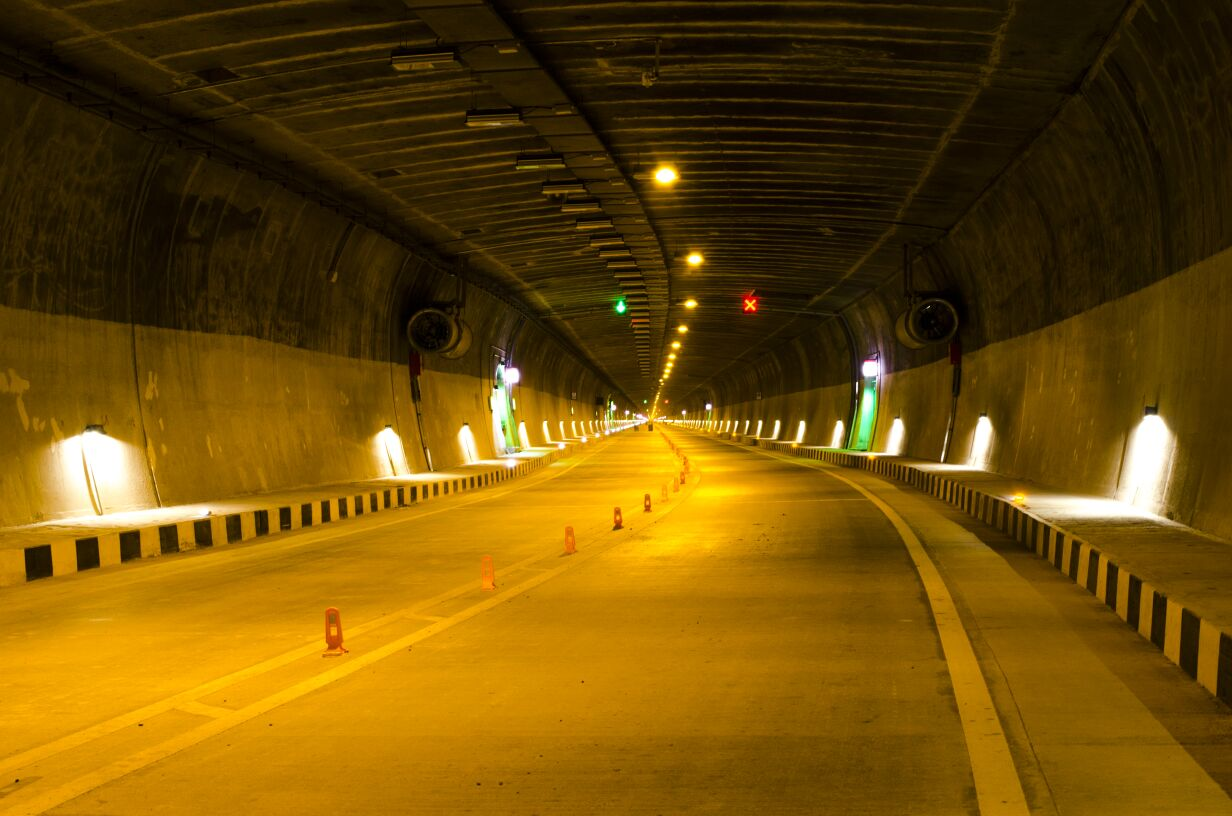
- The Tunnel at night
- Interactive map of Dr. Syama Prasad Mookerjee Tunnel

Overview
- Other name: Chenani-Nashri Tunnel Patnitop Tunnel
- Location: Jammu and Kashmir, India
- Status: Active
- Route: National Highway 44
- Crosses: Patnitop, Kud, and Batote
- Start: Chenani
- End: Nashri, Ramban District

Operation
- Work began: July 2011
- Opened: 2 April 2017
- Owner: National Highways Authority of India
- Traffic: Automotive (except fuel tanker)
- Character: Passenger and freight

Technical
- Design engineer: IL&FS Transportation Networks Ltd
- Length: 9.28 kilometres (5.77 mi)
- No. of lanes: 2
- Operating speed: 50km/h
- Max elevation: 1,200 m (3,937 ft)
- Width: 13 m (43 ft)

Dr. Syama Prasad Mookerjee Tunnel, also known as Chenani-Nashri Tunnel, is a 9.28-kilometre-long (5.77 mi) road tunnel connecting the towns of Chenani and Nashri in Jammu and Kashmir, India. It carries two lanes of National Highway 44.

This all-weather tunnel bypasses an old section of Highway which is full of hair-pin bends and snowfall and avalanche prone areas in winter at places like Patnitop, Kud, and Batote that obstructed the highway every winter and caused long queues of vehicles; sometimes for days.

It is India's longest road tunnel with a length of 9.28 km (5.8 mi), and the country's first tunnel with a fully integrated tunnel control system. It reduces the distance between Jammu and Srinagar by 30 km and travel time by two hours. It is named after Syama Prasad Mookerjee, who served as the Minister for Industry and Supply in Prime Minister Jawaharlal Nehru's cabinet and later founded the Bharatiya Jana Sangh.

== Location ==
The tunnel is located on the lower Himalayan range at an altitude of 1,200 m (3,937 ft). The southern portal (end) of the tunnel is at 33.0463°N 75.2793°E and the northern portal (end) of the tunnel is at coordinates 33.1285°N 75.2928°E. The tunnel has been excavated starting from about 2 km (1 mi) from Chenani town south of Patnitop to Nashri village north of Patnitop.

== Construction ==
The foundation was laid for the project in July 2011 by the then Jammu and Kashmir Chief Minister Omar Abdullah with Union Health Minister Ghulam Nabi Azad, under the ruling UPA government. However the project stalled for the next few year and saw wide fluctuations in estimates with funding difficulties. The original estimate to build this two-lane tunnel was ₹2,520 crore (equivalent to ₹52 billion or US$540 million in 2023), but escalated to a total of ₹3,720 crore (US$390 million). The scheduled date of completion for the project was May 2016. Later, due to a dispute between the construction workers and the executing agency, the work was delayed and the next planned date was then further extended to July 2016.

On 12 October 2016, it was reported that almost all the work had been completed due to pressure from Modi's office and the remaining work was planned to be finished in a few days and that "98 percent civil work including construction of 9 km tunnel and its approach road has been completed while the installation of equipment and gadgets like sound diffusers, ventilators, fans, firefighter equipment, electrical panels, transformers, lighting etc. inside the tunnel is under progress and likely to be completed in next 20–30 days." They added that after the completion of remaining work, it has to pass the quality and commuters’ safety tests, and that the entire process would be completed by last week of November and authorities will inaugurate the "ambitious" project in the first week of December.

However on 3 February 2017, official sources said that the project was getting delayed due to bad weather conditions and snowfall on the highway, which snapped the electricity supply to the area and so the executing agency was unable to continue with the required testing and inspection processes.

According to a news article on 1 March 2017, the Independent Engineers (IEs) reported that the demonetisation on 8 November 2016 resulted in work getting affected as the contractors failed to pay the labour involved in the work. The Construction Company's Executive, Shafaq Syed also confirmed, "Demonetisation crippled our working. We were unable to make payments to our subcontractors.."

The tunnel was inaugurated by the Prime Minister Narendra Modi on 2 April 2017. The construction involved nearly 1,500 engineers, geologists and labourers, besides skilled workers. The National Highways Authority of India has spent ₹3,720 crore on the project.

== Features and benefits ==
Tunnel comprises two tubes that run parallel to each other — the main traffic tunnel of diameter 13 m and a separate safety or escape tunnel of diameter 6 m alongside. The two tubes — each approximately 9 km long — are connected by 29 cross passages at regular intervals of every 300 metres along the entire length of the tunnel. These passages add up to about 1 km of tunnel length, and the main and escape tubes, plus the cross passages make up about 19 km of tunnel length. Since such a long tunnel could present the problem of lack of oxygen, to ensure that there is no excessive carbon-dioxide build-up inside, there are several exhaust metres that will check the air all through the length of the tunnel. With inlets, every 8 metres, bringing fresh air into the main tube, and exhaust outlets every 100 m opening into the escape tube, the tunnel is the country’s first, and the world’s sixth, road tunnel with a transverse ventilation system.

Transverse ventilation will keep tailpipe smoke inside the tunnel at a minimum level in order to prevent suffocation and keep visibility at acceptable levels, especially since the tunnel is so long. The 29 cross passages between the two tunnels will be used to evacuate, through the escape tunnel, a user who might be in distress or to tow away any vehicle that might have broken down in the main tunnel. A total of 124 cameras and a linear heat detection system inside the tunnel will alert the Integrated Tunnel Control Room (ITCR) located outside the tunnel to the need for intervention. In the case of a traffic violation, the Control Room informs the traffic police deployed outside the tunnel, who shall impose a fine on errant drivers on the spot.

SOS boxes installed every 150 m will act as emergency hotlines for commuters in distress. To connect to the ITCR to seek help, one would only need to open the door of the SOS box and say ‘Hello’, said an executive of the project. Commuters can use their mobile phones inside the tunnel. To prevent diminution of vision as a result of change in the light while going in or coming out of the tunnel, the lighting inside has been adjusted at a gradient of luminous strength. The tunnel is built with fire safety measures. As soon as sensors detect fire, a safety protocol will kick in, and the pushing of fresh air will stop and only exhausts will function. Longitudinal exhaust fans installed at regular intervals will concentrate on 300 m on either side of the fire, pushing the smoke upward. Ambulances or vehicles carrying foam will rush through the escape tunnel to evacuate commuters and fight the fire.

The heat detection system inside the tunnel will record rises in temperature in the tunnel — the result of excessive emissions which may be caused by one or more vehicles. In such cases, the ITCR will get in touch with staff inside the tunnel, and the offending vehicle will be pulled over into a lay-by and subsequently removed by a crane through the parallel escape tunnel.

The tunnel is located at an altitude of nearly 4,000 feet in difficult Himalayan terrain. Despite having been excavated in such geographic conditions, both tubes are completely waterproof.

Because of this two-lane tunnel, the distance between Chenani and Nashri and hence between Jammu and Srinagar is reduced by 30 km and travel time is cut by two hours. The tunnel bypasses 44 avalanche and landslide-prone spots on the highway. It is an "all-weather" tunnel and enables an increase in trade and tourism in the state. The tunnel also has parking spots in case of vehicle breakdowns.

== See also ==
- Tunnels in North West India
