= Adhwa =

Village in Jammu and Kashmir

- Village
- Location in Jammu and Kashmir, India Adhwa (India)
- Coordinates: 33.264177°N 75.203569°E
- Country: India
- Union Territory: Jammu and Kashmir
- Division: Jammu Division
- Parliamentary Constituency: Udhampur
- District: Ramban

Population (2011)
  - Total: 1,424

Languages
  - Spoken: Urdu, Pogali
- Time zone: UTC+05:30 (IST)
- PIN: 182144

Adhwa (also Ahdwa) is a village and panchayat located in the Ramban district of the Indian-administered union territory of Jammu and Kashmir.

== Administration ==
Adhwa falls under the administrative jurisdiction of the Ramban district and is governed as a village panchayat.
