= Ramban, Jammu and Kashmir =

Ramban
- Town
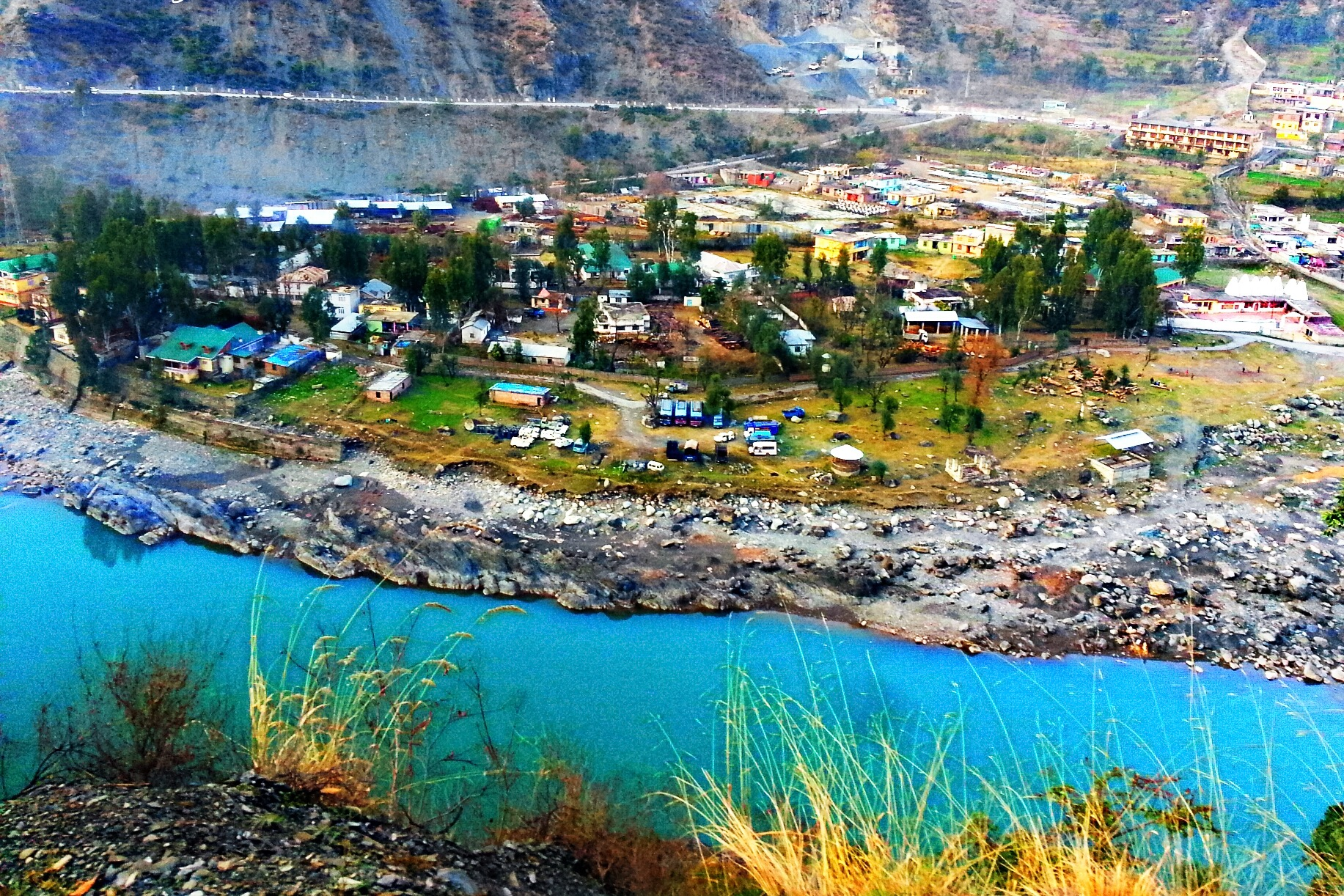
- Chenab River in Ramban town, Jammu and Kashmir, India

- Location in Jammu and Kashmir, India Ramban (India)
- Coordinates: 33.25°N 75.25°E
- Country: India
- Union Territory: Jammu and Kashmir
- District: Ramban
- Established: 1931
- Elevation: 747 m (2,451 ft)

Population (2011)
  - Total: 3,596

Languages
  - Official: Dogri, Kashmiri, Urdu, Hindi, English
  - Regional: Kashmiri, Pogali, Dogri, Gujari, Pahari, Sarazi

Literacy Rate
  - Town: 82.23%
  - District: 54.27%
- Time zone: UTC+5:30 (IST)
- PIN: 182144
- Telephone Code: 01998
- Vehicle registration: JK 19
- Distance from Jammu: 150 km
- Distance from Srinagar: 150 km
- Website: ramban.gov.in

Ramban is a town in Ramban district of Jammu and Kashmir, India in the disputed Kashmir region. which is the district headquarters of Ramban district. It lies on the banks of the Chenab river in Jammu Division on the National Highway-1A (now NH-44) at about 120 km from Jammu and about 130 km from Srinagar, making it almost the central point on the Jammu-Srinagar National Highway.

== History ==
C.E. Bats writes in his book, ‘The Gazetteer of Kashmir’, that before the formation of the J&K State in 1846, there was a small village consisting of 15 houses on the right bank of Chenab river known as Nashband (later 'Ramban'). When Raja Gulab Singh of Jammu became the Maharaja of J&K State, he adopted the Jammu-Udhampur-Banihal route to reach Srinagar for the movement of royal caravans. In this process, Ramban received the status of halting station for the royal caravans. The Dogras constructed a pucca building near present Ramban and a wooden bridge for the crossing of Chenab River. Sukhdev Singh Chadak writes in his book Maharaja Ranbir Singh that Maharaja passed an order for a cart road from Jammu to Srinagar via Banihal and a suspension bridge over Chenab River at Ramban. This road became a national highway; it is being converted into four lanes. With the development of this road, the halting station Ramban also developed significantly and now it has got the status of district headquarters.

== Geography ==
Ramban district has an average elevation of 747 metres (3792 feet). The boundary lines of Ramban district have come to be drawn from Patnitop on its south, Assar on its east, Gool on its west and Banihal on its north. Ramban district comprises seven Tehsils, namely Banihal, Khari, Pogal Paristan, Ramban, Rajgarh and Gool, and four community development blocks, namely Banihal, Gool, Ramban and Ramsoo. The district consisted of 116 census villages and 127 Revenue villages in 2001. Total panchayat Halqas in District Ramban are 142.

== Climate ==
Climate data for Ramban {1981–2023 via satellite based observations ( All values are rounded to the nearest integer )}
Month	Jan	Feb	Mar	Apr	May	Jun	Jul	Aug	Sep	Oct	Nov	Dec	Year
Record high °C (°F)	29 (84)	35 (95)	41 (106)	44 (111)	48 (118)	49 (120)	50 (122)	48 (118)	43 (109)	40 (104)	38 (100)	32 (90)	50 (122)
Mean daily maximum °C (°F)	21 (70)	24 (75)	30 (86)	33 (91)	38 (100)	41 (106)	40 (104)	39 (102)	33 (91)	28 (82)	26 (79)	23 (73)	31 (88)
Mean daily minimum °C (°F)	2 (36)	4 (39)	10 (50)	13 (55)	18 (64)	22 (72)	26 (79)	25 (77)	23 (73)	11 (52)	8 (46)	4 (39)	14 (57)
Record low °C (°F)	−7 (19)	−9 (16)	1 (34)	2 (36)	7 (45)	13 (55)	19 (66)	18 (64)	13 (55)	4 (39)	−1 (30)	−3 (27)	−9 (16)
Average rainfall mm (inches)	120 (4.7)	142 (5.6)	320 (12.6)	240 (9.4)	103 (4.1)	87 (3.4)	230 (9.1)	210 (8.3)	180 (7.1)	92 (3.6)	83 (3.3)	128 (5.0)	1,935 (76.2)
Source: India Meteorological Department

== Demographics ==
Religion in Ramban Town (2011)
1. Hinduism (56.7%)
2. Islam (41.5%)
3. Sikhism (0.53%)
4. Christianity (1.11%)
5. Not Stated (0.20%)

As of 2011, the Indian census shows Ramban town with a population of 3,596, of which 1,873 are males while 1,723 are females. The literacy rate of Ramban town is 82.23%. In Ramban, male literacy is around 90.42% while female literacy rate is 73.52%.

Languages of Ramban (2011)
1. Dogri (41.6%)
2. Kashmiri (25.4%)
3. Sarazi (10.6%)
4. Pogali (9.20%)
5. Others (13.2%)

== Villages in Ramban District ==
List of Villages in Ramban District (A-Z Order)
S. No.	Village Name	Population
1	Adhwa	1,424
2	Ashmar	665
3	Badhol	176
4	Balhote	2,205
5	Balwat	2,285
6	Bandan	1,087
7	Bandhera	297
8	Banera Jagir	353
9	Barthal	487
10	Batli	1,330
11	Beruni Batote	463
12	Beruni Ramban	426
13	Bhajmasta	1,366
14	Bhathan	906
15	Bhehimdasa	1,126
16	Chaka	1,325
17	Chakwah	957
18	Chanderkot	1,501
19	Chhachhwan	2,860
20	Chhampa	3,444
21	Chilla	59
22	Dalwah	5,431
23	Damote	2,538
24	Daramen	761
25	Darham	3,961
26	Dehdah	2,636
27	Deswal	60
28	Dhalwas Dhaino	2,153
29	Dhandla	1,525
30	Dhandnat	1,703
31	Dhar	852
32	Dharalta	911
33	Dharli	107
34	Dharmond	2,603
35	Dhothan Jagir	611
36	Digdole	1,288
37	Dukson	1,011
38	Famroot	1,519
39	Forest Block	92
40	Gam	1,029
41	Gandhote	1,558
42	Gandri	1,591
43	Ganote	1,557
44	Ghari	1,149
45	Gool	9,574
46	Gundi	3,336
47	Halla	2,870
48	Haroge	2,139
49	Hiller	830
50	Ind	1,515
51	Jawari	2,337
52	Jhatgali	2,009
53	Kahbi Jagir	1,770
54	Kalimasta	1,789
55	Kamet	1,327
56	Kanfar	2,579
57	Kanthi	1,978
58	Karman	1,459
59	Kathri	401
60	Khanga	2,453
61	Kothi Jagir	1,043
62	Kundi	759
63	Lodhwal	620
64	Maha Kund	2,404
65	Marog	1,195
66	Mawalkot	1,289
67	Metra gobind Pura	4,108
68	Narthyal	1,043
69	Neghal	1,475
70	Nera	1,343
71	Papryah	939
72	Pari Jagir	130
73	Pernote	3,260
74	Rajgarh	2,122
75	Rakh Jargoh	1,169
76	Sana	1,998
77	Sanasar	2,586
78	Sancha	796
79	Sangaldan	876
80	Sarbhangni	2,346
81	Savni	1,986
82	Seldhar	1,265
83	Seri	2,023
84	Shagan	2,891
85	Sonmbar Barhog	2,003
86	Sripura	1,311
87	Tanger	343
88	Tatarsu	1,260
89	Teli	476
90	Thanger Jagir	1,292
91	Thatharka	3,105
92	Thopal	869
93	Tringla	492
94	Wanding	186

== Attractions ==
=== Gajpat Fort ===
There is an important fort known as Gajpat Fort on the top of the mountain. It is said that once Sheikh Abdullah was kept imprisoned in this fort for several days during initial years of accession of Jammu and Kashmir. In 1825, Gulab Singh imprisoned Raja Sultan Khan of Bimbar in this fort. Sultan Khan died there and was buried at Chanderkote. In 1858 Mean Hathu Singh, the Governor of Rajouri, and close relatives of Maharaja revolted against the state government and tried to kill Maharaja Ranbir Singh. Mean Hathu was arrested and moved to Gajpat fort.

=== Mosques in Ramban ===
Jamma Masjid is located in Masjid Market Ramban Just Near newly Constructed Flyover Cafeteria Masjid and Jadeed Jamma Masjid Near Higher Secondary school Ramban and other mosques in Maitra is Jamia Masjid Salfia Upper Maitra.

== Literacy rate ==
- Town: 82.23%
- District: 54.27%

== Gallery ==
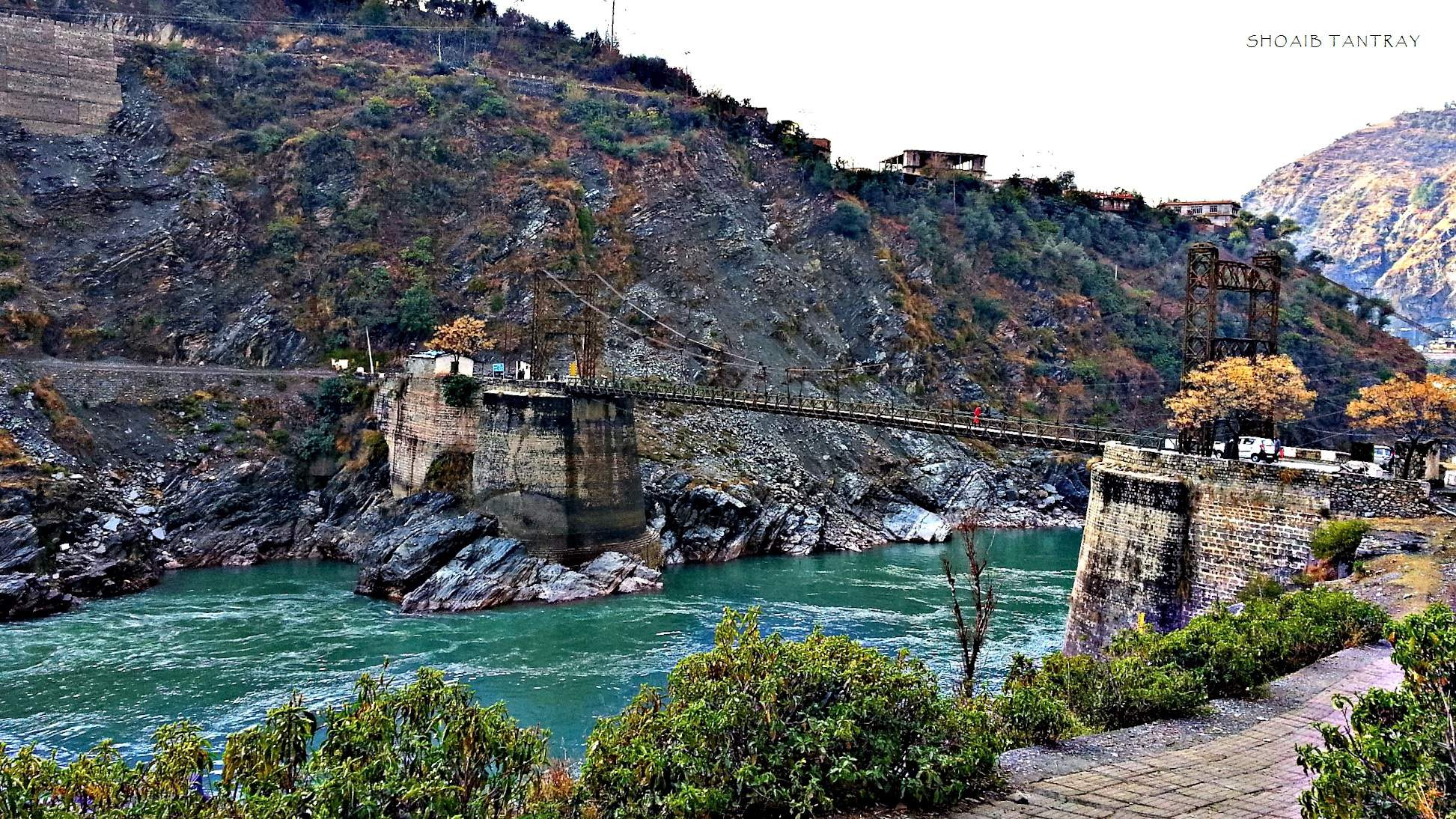
Old Bridge over Chenab river at Ramban

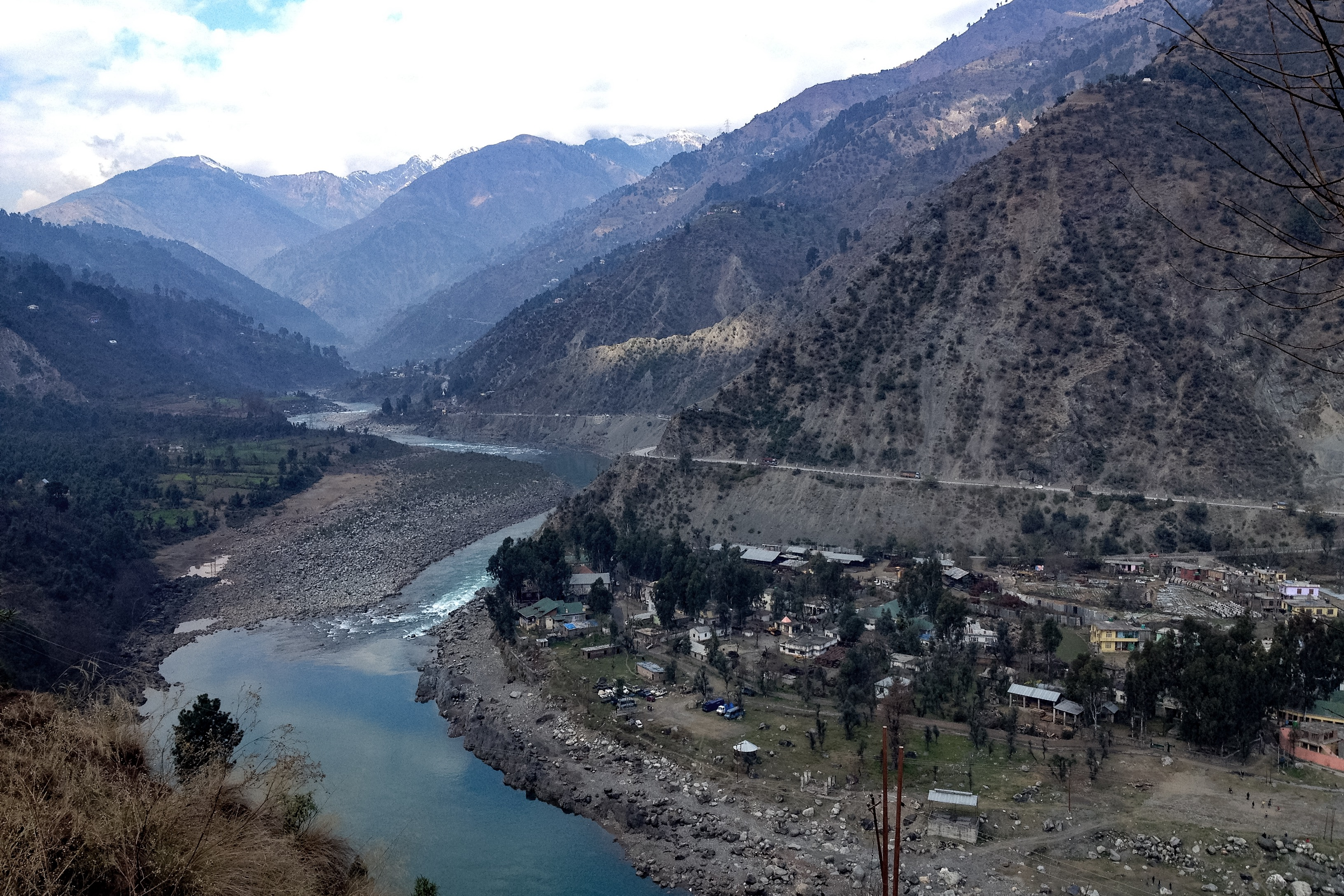
Chenab flowing through Ramban

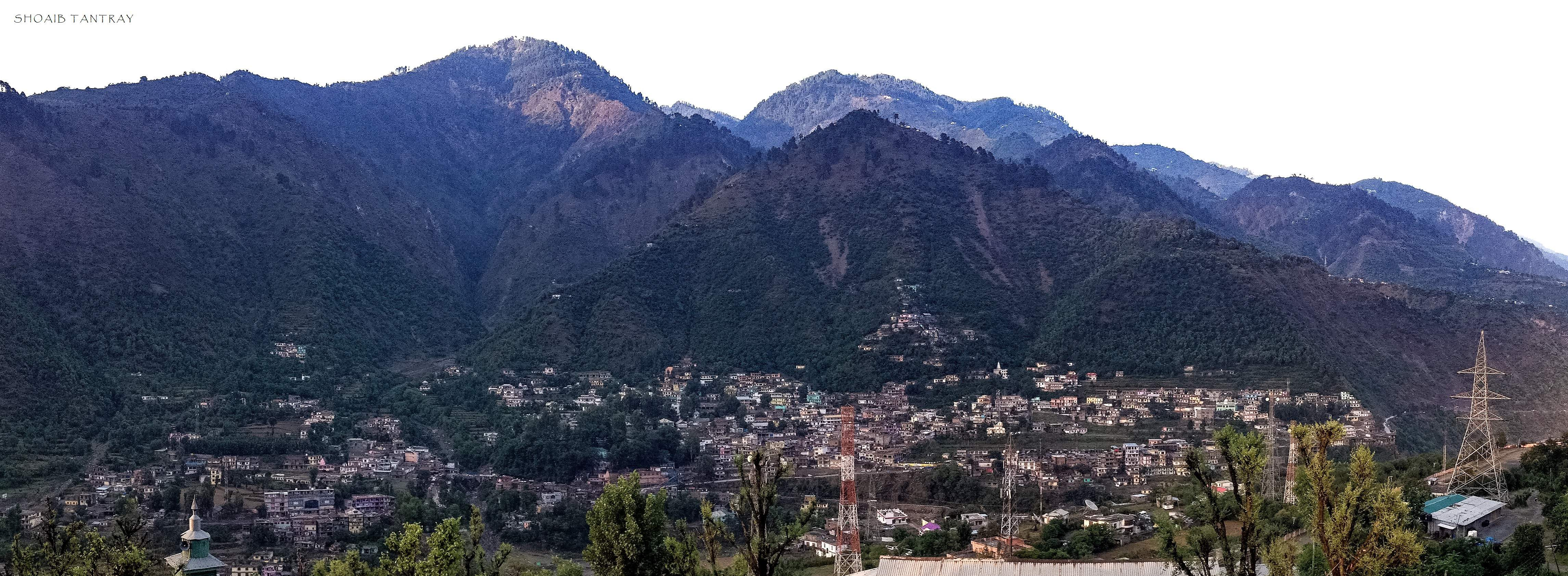
Ramban Panorama as seen from Chandrog

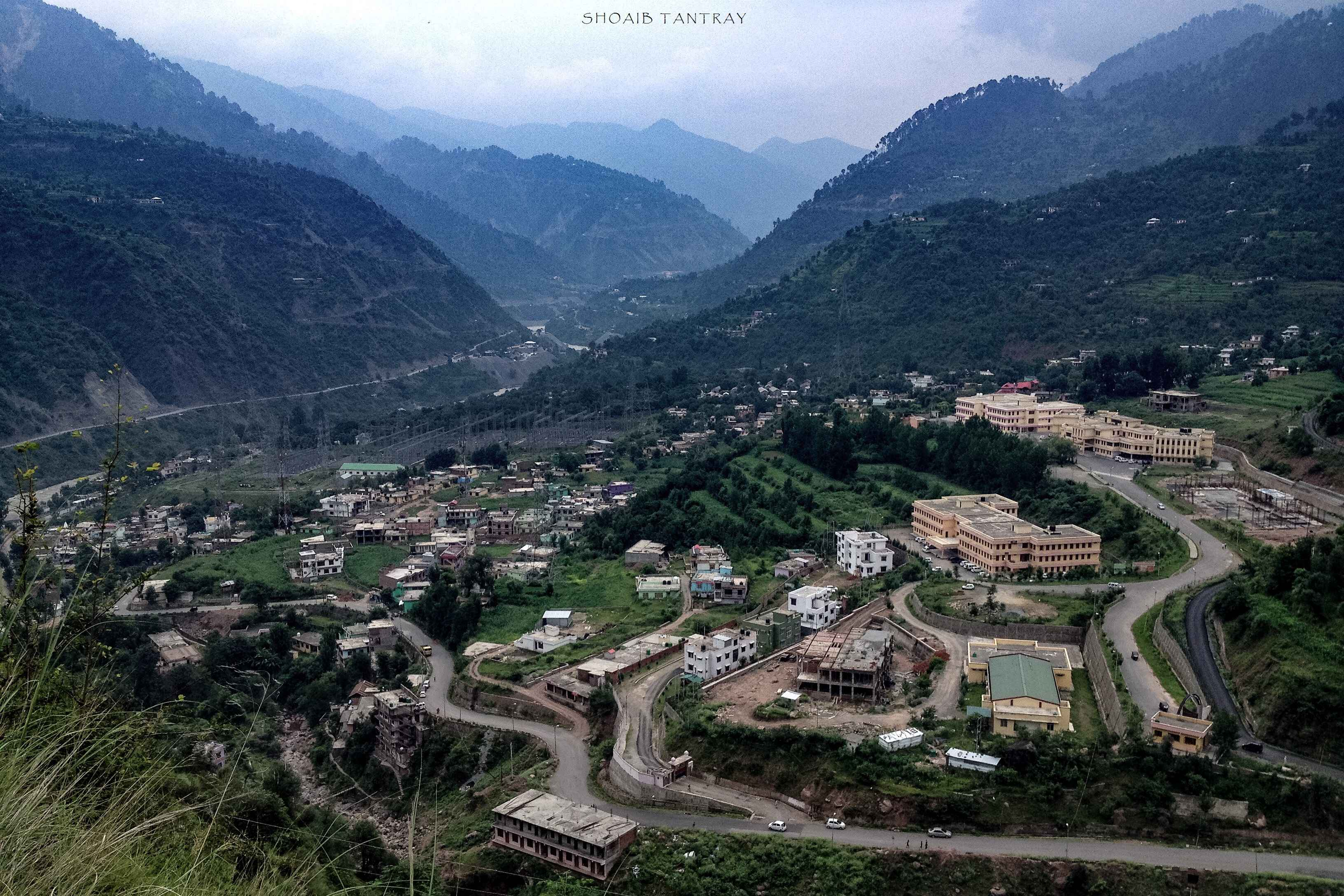
Maitra, Ramban

== Transport ==
=== Road ===
Ramban is well-connected by road to other places in Jammu and Kashmir, India by the NH 44.

=== Rail ===
Ramban is connected with railways. The nearest railway station is Sangaldan-Ramban Railway Station, located at a distance of 28 kilometres.

=== Air ===
The nearest airport is Jammu Airport, located at a distance of 124 kilometres.

== See also ==
- Ramban district
- Banihal
- Sangaldan
