= Dhiraj Singh Thakur =

4th Chief Justice of Andhra Pradesh High Court

Hon'ble Chief Justice (Retd.) Dhiraj Singh Thakur
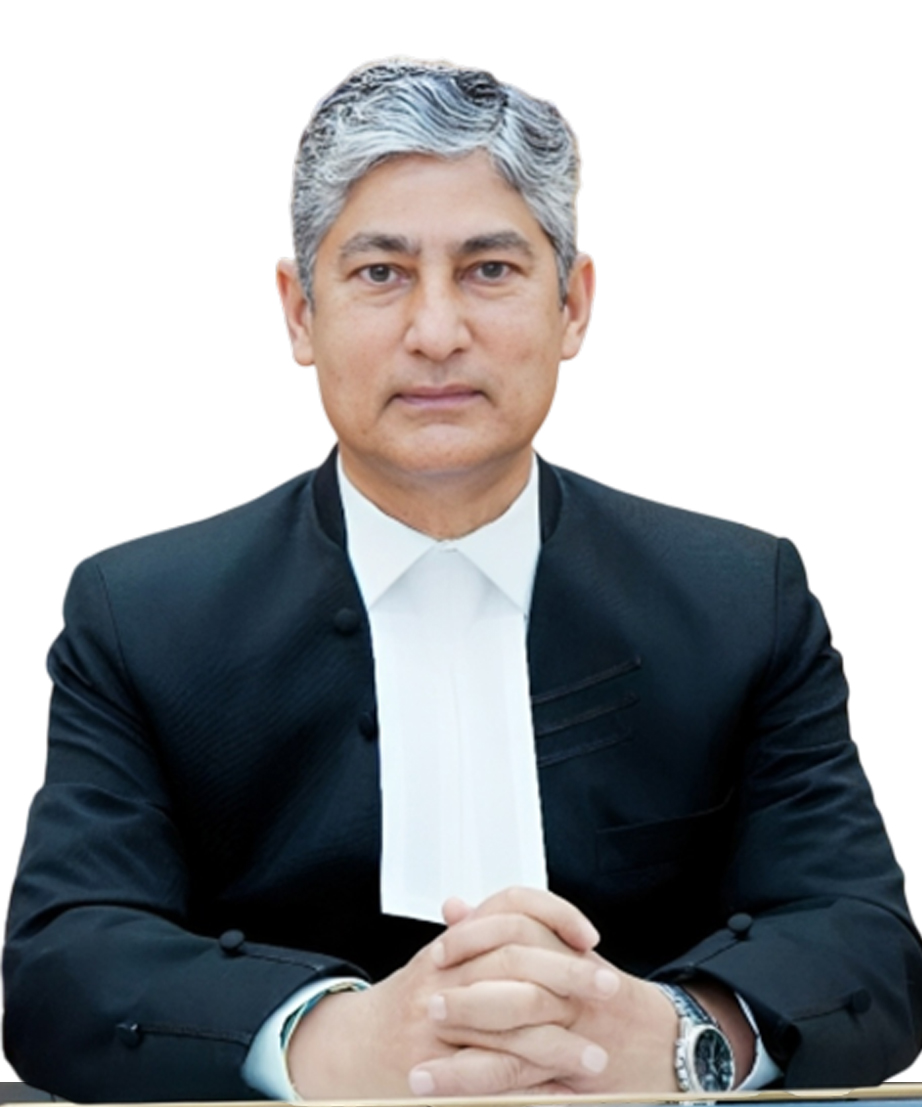

4th Chief Justice of Andhra Pradesh High Court
- In office 28 July 2023 – 24 April 2026
- Nominated by: D. Y. Chandrachud
- Appointed by: Droupadi Murmu
- Preceded by: P. K. Mishra; A. V. Sesha Sai (acting)
- Succeeded by: Lisa Gill

Judge of Bombay High Court
- In office 10 June 2022 – 27 July 2023
- Nominated by: N. V. Ramana
- Appointed by: Ram Nath Kovind

Judge of Jammu & Kashmir and Ladakh High Court
- In office 8 March 2013 – 9 June 2022
- Nominated by: Altamas Kabir
- Appointed by: Pranab Mukherjee

Personal details
- Born: 25 April 1964 (age 62)
- Relations: Tirath Singh Thakur (Brother)
- Parent: Devi Das Thakur
- Education: LL. B.
- Alma mater: Jammu University

Dhiraj Singh Thakur (born 25 April 1964) is a retired Indian judge, who had served as the 4th Chief Justice of Andhra Pradesh High Court. He is a former judge of Bombay High Court and Jammu & Kashmir and Ladakh High Court.

== Early life ==
He was born on 25 April 1964 to late Devi Das Thakur, jurist and politician who had served as Deputy Chief Minister of Jammu and Kashmir, Judge of Jammu and Kashmir High Court, Governor of Assam and Arunachal Pradesh. He also have elder brother T. S. Thakur, who served as 43rd Chief Justice of India.

== Career ==
He was enrolled as an advocate on 18 October 1989 with the Bar Council of Delhi and subsequently with the Bar Council of Jammu and Kashmir on 26 November 2010. He joined chambers of his brother Thakur and was designated as Senior Advocate in the year 2011.

He was elevated as Judge of Jammu & Kashmir and Ladakh High Court on 8 March 2013. He was transferred as Judge of Bombay High Court on 10 June 2022.

In February 2023 Supreme Court collegium recommended his appointment as Chief Justice of Manipur High Court but later in July 2023 collegium recommended him to be appointed as Chief Justice of Andhra Pradesh High Court instead of Manipur High Court

He was appointed as Chief Justice of Andhra Pradesh High Court on 28 July 2023. He retired as Andhra Pradesh High Court chief justice on 24 April 2026 on reaching mandatory age of retirement i.e. 62 years.
