= Lisa Gill =

5th Chief Justice of Andhra Pradesh High Court

The Honourable Justice Lisa Gill
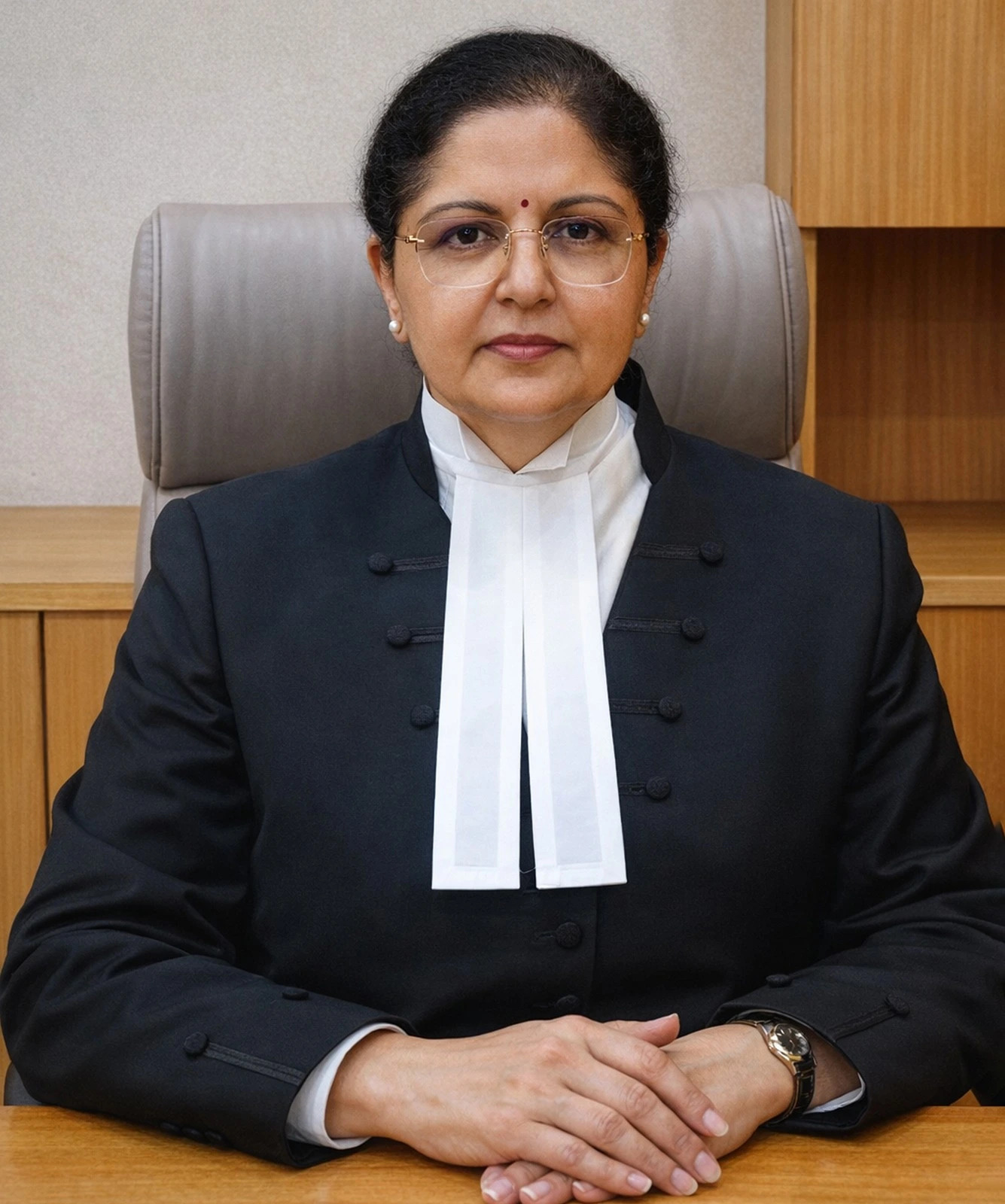
- Official portrait

5th Chief Justice of Andhra Pradesh High Court
- Incumbent
- Assumed office 25 April 2026
- Nominated by: Surya Kant
- Appointed by: Droupadi Murmu
- Preceded by: Dhiraj Singh Thakur

Judge of Andhra Pradesh High Court
- In office 13 March 2026 – 24 April 2026
- Nominated by: Surya Kant
- Appointed by: Droupadi Murmu

Judge of Punjab & Haryana High Court
- In office 31 March 2014 – 12 March 2026
- Nominated by: P. Sathasivam
- Appointed by: Pranab Mukherjee

Personal details
- Born: 17 November 1966 (age 59)
- Education: Panjab University

Lisa Gill (born 17 November 1966) is an Indian judge, currently serving as the 5th Chief Justice Andhra Pradesh High Court. She is a former judge of Andhra Pradesh High Court and Punjab and Haryana High Court.

== Early life ==
Justice Gill was born on 17 November 1966. She completed her schooling from Carmel Convent School at Chandigarh. She is completed her B. A., LL.B and LL.M from Department of Laws at Panjab University. In 1990 she enrolled as an advocate and started practising in Punjab and Haryana High Court. She has experience in various cases including criminal, civil revenue, constitutional and service matters.

== Career ==
She was appointed as an Additional Judge of the Punjab and Haryana High Court on 31 March 2014 and was made permanent on 19 December 2014. In February 2026, Supreme court collegium, in accordance with its new transfer policy for chief justices, first recommended her transfer as puisne judge and subsequent elevation as chief justice of Andhra Pradesh High Court in April 2026 when the then chief justice Dhiraj Singh Thakur were to be retire. She was transferred to Andhra Pradesh High Court in March 2026.

On 22 April 2026 she was appointed as chief justice and took oath of office on 25 April 2026 becoming first woman to hold the chief justice post in Andhra Pradesh High Court.
