= Jhatgali =

- Village and Tehsil
- Country: India
- Union Territory: Jammu and Kashmir
- Division: Jammu Division
- Region: Chenab Valley
- District: Ramban
- Established: 17th Century

Jhatgali is a village and panchayat in tehsil Rajgarh of the Ramban district of Indian administered union territory of Jammu and Kashmir (Union territory). This village comprises various hamlets such as Gagwan, Halla, Marot, Bataar, etc.
