= Batote =

- Town
- Location in Ramban,Jammu ,Jammu and Kashmir, India Batote (India)
- Coordinates: 33.10°N 75.32°E
- Country: India
- Union Territory: Jammu and Kashmir
- Division: Jammu
- District: Ramban
- Elevation: 1,555 m (5,102 ft)

Population (2011)
  - Total: 4,315

Languages
  - Official: Hindi, Dogri
- Time zone: UTC+5:30 (IST)
- PIN: 182143

Batote is a town and a notified area committee, near Ramban town in Ramban district of Indian union territory of Jammu and Kashmir on NH 44 (former name NH 1A) just beyond Ramban, Patnitop while going towards Srinagar.

== Tourism ==
Batote is located on the national highway NH 44 from Jammu to Srinagar at 33.10°N 75.32°E. It has an average elevation of 1,555 metres (6,584 feet).

Batote is very green and has many mountains. It also has a small city centre. Summer temperatures reach 32°C.There is snowfall in the winters. Nearby picnic spots Patnitop and Sanasar, which are located 14 km and 32 km away, respectively. A nearby unexplored beautiful location can be reached only by trekking.

== Languages ==
Languages of Batote (2011)
1. Dogri (69.9%)
2. Punjabi (9.08%)
3. Hindi (6.51%)
4. Kashmiri (5.70%)
5. Others (8.77%)

== Demographics ==
Religion in Batote (2011)
1. Hinduism (45.8%)
2. Islam (45.0%)
3. Sikhism (8.34%)
4. Christianity (0.49%)
5. Buddhism (0.02%)
6. Jainism (0.02%)
7. Others (0.02%)
8. Not Stated (0.25%)

As of 2011 census, Batote had a population of 4,315. Males constitute 55% of the population and females 45%. Batote has an average literacy rate of 71%, higher than the national average of 59.5%; with 60% of the males and 40% of females literate. 8% of the population is under six years of age.

== Administration ==
The town of Batote is administered by a Municipal Committee. Prior to April 1982, there was just one Directorate of Local Bodies for the whole former State of Jammu and Kashmir. In order to provide better facilities in both regions and for the convenience of the general public, the Government of Jammu and Kashmir divided it into two administrative units in April 1982, led by the Director, Urban Local Bodies, Jammu for the Jammu region and the Director, Urban Local Bodies, Kashmir for the Kashmir region. Batote became a Municipal Committee under the administrative jurisdiction of the Director, Urban Local Bodies, Jammu with the formation of an autonomous Directorate of Urban Local Bodies. The Municipal Committee of Batote covers an area of 6.480 sq km. Swach Bharat Mission 2.0, Swachhta Hi Seva 2026 have been implemented in Batote. It is subdivided into 7 wards: Tringla Mohalla, Mansar, Mir Mohalla, Purani Batote, Kumar Mohalla, Palli Chimar and Mandas. Sh. Sudershan Singh is the Executive Officer of the Municipal Committee of Batote.

== Climate ==
Climate data for Batote (1991–2020, extremes 1977–2020)
Month	Jan	Feb	Mar	Apr	May	Jun	Jul	Aug	Sep	Oct	Nov	Dec	Year
Record high °C (°F)	22.6 (72.7)	23.7 (74.7)	27.0 (80.6)	31.2 (88.2)	36.6 (97.9)	36.3 (97.3)	34.2 (93.6)	32.5 (90.5)	30.3 (86.5)	29.2 (84.6)	26.1 (79.0)	22.1 (71.8)	36.6 (97.9)
Mean daily maximum °C (°F)	10.8 (51.4)	12.2 (54.0)	16.9 (62.4)	21.9 (71.4)	26.1 (79.0)	27.9 (82.2)	26.7 (80.1)	26.2 (79.2)	25.7 (78.3)	23.3 (73.9)	18.3 (64.9)	14.2 (57.6)	21.0 (69.8)
Mean daily minimum °C (°F)	2.1 (35.8)	3.4 (38.1)	6.9 (44.4)	10.7 (51.3)	13.8 (56.8)	16.8 (62.2)	18.6 (65.5)	18.2 (64.8)	15.3 (59.5)	10.5 (50.9)	6.6 (43.9)	3.8 (38.8)	10.7 (51.3)
Record low °C (°F)	−5.7 (21.7)	−7.2 (19.0)	−3.0 (26.6)	1.2 (34.2)	3.2 (37.8)	8.0 (46.4)	11.0 (51.8)	10.8 (51.4)	7.8 (46.0)	3.1 (37.6)	−2.1 (28.2)	−3.8 (25.2)	−7.2 (19.0)
Average rainfall mm (inches)	183.7 (7.23)	228.3 (8.99)	205.8 (8.10)	125.4 (4.94)	89.8 (3.54)	109.7 (4.32)	160.1 (6.30)	158.9 (6.26)	110.0 (4.33)	33.0 (1.30)	49.6 (1.95)	74.8 (2.94)	1,529 (60.20)
Average rainy days	6.7	8.0	8.5	7.3	6.8	7.7	9.1	9.4	4.9	2.4	2.5	3.6	77.0
Average relative humidity (%) (at 17:30 IST)	61	64	57	51	47	55	74	78	73	57	52	50	60
Source: India Meteorological Department

== Transport ==
=== Road ===
Batote is well-connected by road to other places in Jammu and Kashmir and India by the NH 44.

=== Rail ===
Batote is not connected with railways. The nearest railway station is Udhampur railway station located at a distance of 43 kilometres.

=== Air ===
The nearest airport is Jammu Airport located at a distance of 112 kilometres.

== See also ==
- Jammu and Kashmir
- Banihal
- Ramban
- Doda
