= Pogal Paristan =

- Tehsil
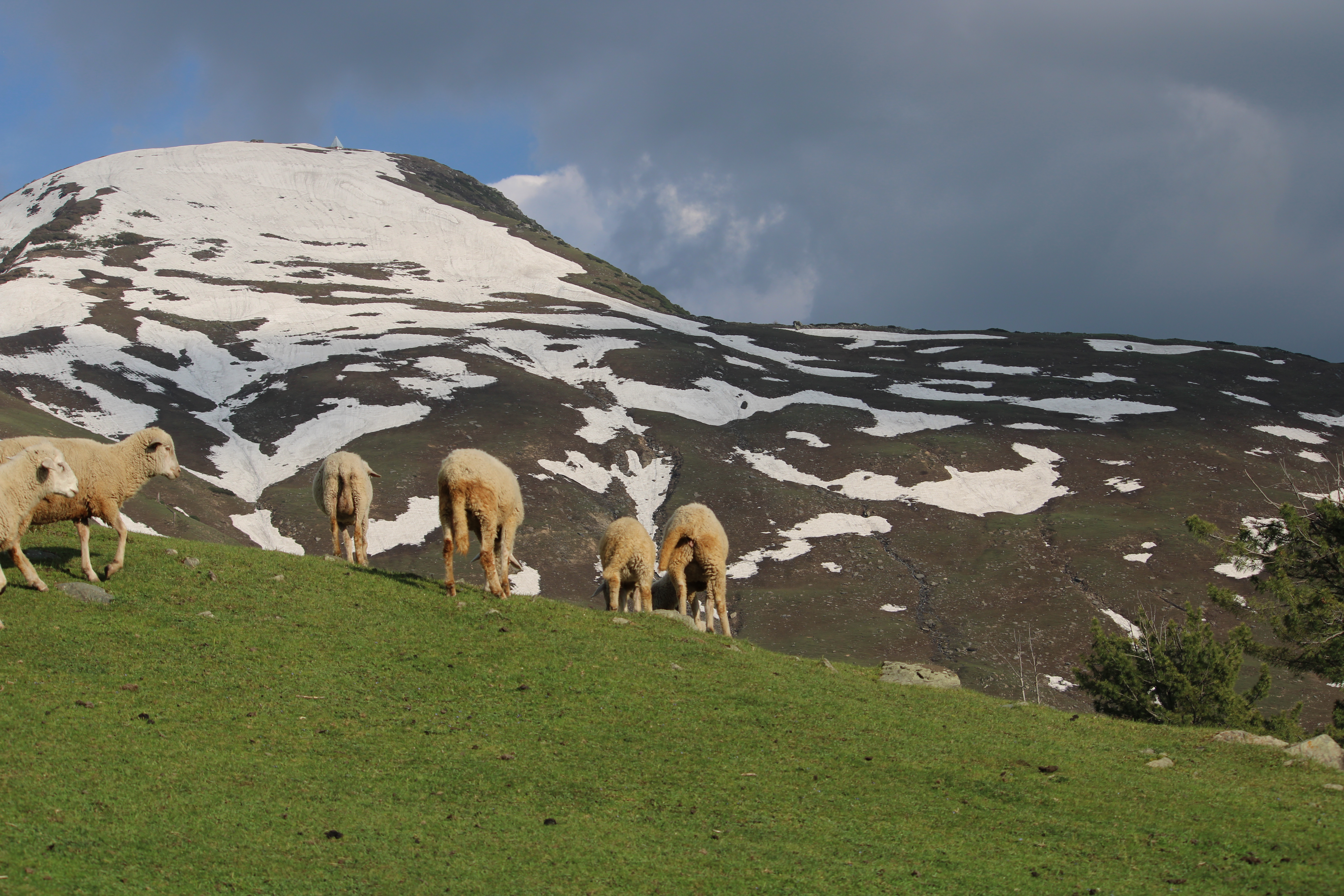
- Sarwadhar Meadows

- Location in Jammu and Kashmir, India Pogal Paristan (India)
- Coordinates: 33.313086°N 75.261806°E
- Country: India
- Union Territory: Jammu and Kashmir
- Division: Jammu Division
- Region: Chenab Valley
- District: Ramban
- Established: 2014

Languages
  - Official: Urdu

Local Languages
  - Spoken: Pogali, Kashmiri, Urdu, Gojri
- Time zone: UTC+5:30 (IST)
- Pincode: 182145

Pogal Paristan is a valley in the Ramban district of the Chenab region in Jammu Division of the Union territory of Jammu and Kashmir, India. Since 2014 its area has constituted a separate tehsil within Ramban district. The valley is situated about 35 kilometers far from District Headquarter Ramban and 23 kilometers from Sub-District Banihal. It is situated in Ramban District in Chenab Valley which is located 150 Kilometers from Jammu and 150 kilometres from Srinagar making it almost the central point on the national highway.

== Etymology ==
The name Pogal Paristan is derived from the names of two valleys, the Pogal and Paristan Valleys. The name Paristan is derived from Muslim folklore. It means land of the fairies .

== Geography ==
The Pogal Valley lies on the southeast end of Tehsil Banihal, and a stream known as 'Sundari'or pogal stream, The two rivers of pogal and paristan meet and forms a river called as 'Madhumati' runs through it. The Paristan Valley is a narrow valley situated at the southeast end of Tehsil Banihal that runs roughly east to west. Its south side is a forest-covered mountain range of considerable elevation, while the north is a range of mostly bare and stony hills. The path from Kishtwar to Kashmir, by the Nandmarg pass, crosses the Paristan Valley; it is used early in the season before the Brari Bal route becomes usable. A village in the valley named Paristan, which is a part of the Banihal area, lies along this path. It Paristan is located on a spur above the west side of the village of Halan. The valley contains large villages but does contain numerous hamlets and a considerable amount of agricultural cultivation.

In 2014, Pogal Paristan Tehsil was carved out of Banihal Tehsil. The valley comprises a Block Development Constituency (BDC) where current BDC is Karleep Singh Bali in 2022, two District Development Constituencies, and nineteen Panchayats. There are ten revenue villages in the tehsil; Pogal, Panchal, Alinbass, Muthlal, Hochak, Paristan, Senabathi, Bingara, Nardyal, Dhanmasta, and Yamuna.

== Economy ==
Inhabitants in Pogal Paristan are mostly agricultural, and grow crops such as maize, potatoes, and pluses (rajma). Fruits like apple, apricot, peach, quince, anjeer (fig), plum are also grown. Walnuts are also grown in this region.

The place has several scenic niches, i.e. Chapnagla, Pasthati etc. Some most famous tourist spot include Sunaseri, Sarwadhar, Hinjni, Doodhpav' Tookra' Hummergali, Kakargali, Googli Dhar, Beranbass in Paristan area and Sargali, Rohan Top, Taparwan, Hansraj top in Pogal area.The only thing that requires attention is better road connectivity.

== Weather ==
The climate is described as pleasant in the summer and cold and harsh in the winter.

== Streams ==
The two major streams in Pogal Paristan are the 'Sundari' or 'Pogal Stream' and the Paristan (or Peristan) stream. The Paritsan stream flows west from its headwaters on a mountain at the north-east end of the valley, while the Sundari (Pogal Stream) flows southwest down the southern slopes of the Nandimarg Mountain, until the two unite upstream of the Paristan (Peristan) Stream's junction with the Madhumati River. The banks of the Paristan (Peristan) Stream are mostly high and steep, especially on its north side. It is bridged just west of the Village of Chewly. A ford is located a short distance upstream of the bridge, and its possible that there are more in other parts of the river.
