= Kud =

- Town
- Location in Jammu and Kashmir Kud (India)
- Coordinates: 33.078°N 75.291°E
- Country: India
- Union Territory: Jammu and Kashmir
- District: Udhampur
- Tehsil: Chenani
- Elevation: 1,855 m (6,086 ft)

Population (2011)
  - Total: 1,565

Demographics
  - Literacy: 71.76%
  - Sex ratio: 966 ♀/ 1000 ♂

Languages
  - Official: Dogri, English, Hindi, Kashmiri, Urdu
  - Spoken: Bharmouri, Dogri, Gojri, Hindi, Pahari
- Time zone: UTC+5:30 (IST)
- PIN: 182142
- Vehicle registration: JK-14
- Website: jktdc.co.in/Kud.aspx

Kud is a town and a notified area committee in Udhampur district in the Indian union territory of Jammu and Kashmir. It is about 10 km from the popular tourist place Patnitop and is famous for a local sweet known as "Desi Ghee Patisa" another name of the sweet made up of milk products. Desi Ghee is a milk product and patisa is known as Papdi.

== Geography ==
Kud is located at 33.08°N 75.28°E. It has an average elevation of 1855 metres (6085 feet).It is a part of the Lower Himalayan Range. the river Chenab flows in close proximity. It is located on the NH 44, 100 km from Jammu and 38 km from Udhampur city. It is just short of the tourist spot of Patnitop while driving to Patnitop from Udhampur. After Patnitop is the adjoining town of Batote.

== Demographics ==
Religion in Kud Town (2011)
1. Hinduism (90.7%)
2. Islam (4.60%)
3. Sikhism (4.60%)
4. Jainism (0.06%)

As of 2011 India census, Kud had a population of 1140. Males constitute 54% of the population and females 46%. Kud has an average literacy rate of 59%, lower than the national average of 59.5%: male literacy is 69%, and female literacy is 47%. In Kud, 14% of the population is under 6 years of age.

== Transportation ==
=== Air ===
The nearest airport is Jammu Airport in Jammu located 106 kilometres from Kud.

=== Rail ===
Kud is not connected with railways. The nearest railway station is Udhampur railway station located 38 kilometres from Kud.

=== Road ===
Kud is well-connected with roads and highways. The NH 44 passes through Kud on the way towards Srinagar.

== See also ==
- Jammu and Kashmir
- Patnitop
- Sanasar
- Udhampur railway station
- Jammu Airport
