= Gool, Jammu and Kashmir =

Gool Valley
- Town
- Nickname: Mini Kashmir
- Location in Jammu and Kashmir Gool Valley (India)
- Coordinates: 33.26°N 74.99°E
- Country: India
- Union Territory: Jammu and Kashmir
- District: Ramban
- Tehsil: Gool
- Elevation: 1,421 m (4,662 ft)

Population (2011)
  - Total: 4,315
- Demonym(s): Gooler, Gooli

Languages
  - Official: Kashmiri, Hindi, Urdu, English, Dogri
  - Spoken: Kashmiri
- Time zone: UTC+5:30 (IST)
- PIN: 182144

Gool Valley is a town in Ramban district of Jammu and Kashmir, India.

== Demographics ==
The small hilly town has a population of around 80,000 to 200000. Including people from Kashmiri community as well as a small chunk of gujjar community.

== Geography ==
It is situated 52 km from Ramban town and around 180 km from Jammu & Srinagar Bus stand in Chenab Valley. It is surrounded by mountains. It is in the modern day 'Jammu division' although a historical extension of the kashmir valley. Surrounded by the Lush green meadows, gushing fresh water springs, green pastures are the natural assets of guèl (as locally pronounced).

== Culture ==
Kashmiri language is mainly spoken there.

It has an ancient site called Gohra Galli, believed to be of the time of Mahabharata.

Giant sculptures and horses were said to have been carved by the legendary Pandavas out of monolithic stones. It is recognised by the State archaeological department. Daggan top and Aramkund are tourist attractions that offer meadows and green pasture land.

== Governance ==
Shamshada Shan was elected Chairperson of District Development Council Ramban in 2021.

Sakhi Mohd was elected District Development Council Member from Gool constituency in 2020.

Shakeela Akhter was elected Block Development Council Chairperson in 2019.

== Transport ==
Transportation services are available from Srinagar to Gool via train service as well as the roads. Jammu to Gool, Ramban to Gool, Sangaldan to Gool & Mahore to Gool.

== History ==
During the height of insurgency in Kashmir valley in the 90s, Gool was also a hotspot trapped in the cross-fire between the insurgents and the Indian government forces. One of the well known incident took place on June 15, 1997, Ashok Raina, principal of a higher secondary school, along with two teachers were killed by Hizb fighters. They were accused of colliding with the state. Similar fate was suffered by locals in various different villages of the town.

=== Gool incident ===
On 18 July 2013 government forces fired on a protesting crowd of Kashmiri muslims primarily belong to the Gool region, in the Dharam area of Gool. The protests erupted near the camp side after it was alleged that the government forces had desecrated the Quran. Due to the intensity of clashes and immense police brutality to crush the unrest, four people were killed (including Manzoor Ahmed Shan and Javed Manhas). Whereas 44 were injured, according to official sources, although residents claimed that six had been killed.
