= Rajgarh, Jammu and Kashmir =

Tehsil in Jammu and Kashmir

Rajgarh
- Village and Tehsil
- Location in Jammu and Kashmir, India Rajgarh (India)
- Coordinates: 32.9967°N 75.2664°E
- Country: India
- Union Territory: Jammu and Kashmir
- Division: Jammu
- Region: Chenab Valley
- District: Ramban
- Founded: Ancient

Languages
  - Spoken: Urdu, Dogri, Pogli
- Time zone: UTC+5:30 (IST)

Rajgarh is a village and tehsil located in the Ramban district of the Indian-administered union territory of Jammu and Kashmir. It is situated approximately 23 kilometers away from the nearest town, Ramban.

== See also ==
- Ramban district
- Jammu and Kashmir (union territory)
