= Patnitop =

- Hill Station
- Sanasar, a small lake in Patnitop in Udhampur district, Jammu and Kashmir, India

- Location in Jammu and Kashmir Patnitop (India)
- Coordinates: 33°5′25″N 75°19′35″E
- Country: India
- Union Territory: Jammu and Kashmir
- District: Udhampur
- Elevation: 2,024 m (6,640 ft)

Languages
  - Official: Hindi, Dogri
- Time zone: UTC+5:30 (IST)
- PIN: 182142
- Website: patnitop.jk.gov.in

Patnitop is a hill station, located, between Ramban Town and Udhampur city in the Udhampur district of Jammu and Kashmir, India. It is in located on the Jammu-Srinagar National Highway (which is part of National Highway 44, formerly 1A), 112 km (70 mi) from Jammu, on the way from Udhampur to Srinagar. Situated in the lower Himalayan belt of the Himalayas, Patnitop sits at an altitude of 2,024 m (6,640 ft). The river Chenab flows in close proximity to this location.

== Dr. Syama Prasad Mookerjee Tunnel ==
Frequent snowfall and avalanches in winter at Patnitop often obstructed the Jammu–Srinagar National Highway, causing long queues of vehicles, sometimes lasting for days. These challenges were mitigated by the opening of the Dr. Syama Prasad Mookerjee Tunnel. At 9.2 km (6 mi), it is India's longest road tunnel. The tunnel begins approximately 2 km (1 mi) from Chenani town, south of Patnitop, and extends to Nashri village, north of Patnitop. This reduces the distance from Jammu to Srinagar by 31 km (19 mi), bypassing Patnitop and ensuring all-weather connectivity.

== The Patnitop Ropeway ==
Skyview Patnitop is India's highest ropeway and the largest Indo-French collaboration in mountain infrastructure development was built in a record time of 2.4 years under the Public-Private Partnership (PPP) model. The ropeway started its commercial operations on 20 July 2020. A month after starting its commercial operation, the Skyview Patnitop by Empyrean, an initiative by Empyrean Skyview Projects Private Limited (ESPPL), was awarded the best adventure tourism destination 2019 .It features India's highest ropeway with over 65 meters of ground clearance and the longest span of 849 meters between eight towers . The Ropeway reduces the travel time between Sanget and Patnitop to 15 minutes from the earlier 1.5 hours .

== Climate ==
Climate data for Patnitop, elevation 2,024 m (6,640 ft), (1991–2020, extremes 1962–2020)
Month	Jan	Feb	Mar	Apr	May	Jun	Jul	Aug	Sep	Oct	Nov	Dec	Year
Record high °C (°F)	9.6 (49.3)	12.1 (53.8)	18.5 (65.3)	20.9 (69.6)	24.2 (75.6)	27.8 (82.0)	30.3 (86.5)	30.9 (87.6)	28.7 (83.7)	22.0 (71.6)	16.9 (62.4)	12.3 (54.1)	30.9 (87.6)
Mean daily maximum °C (°F)	1.3 (34.3)	1.8 (35.2)	4.2 (39.6)	10.6 (51.1)	12.4 (54.3)	19.8 (67.6)	20.7 (69.3)	21.4 (70.5)	20.1 (68.2)	11.6 (52.9)	4.4 (39.9)	1.7 (35.1)	10.8 (51.5)
Mean daily minimum °C (°F)	−12.7 (9.1)	−11.8 (10.8)	−7.4 (18.7)	−4.8 (23.4)	1.3 (34.3)	4.7 (40.5)	7.2 (45.0)	8.1 (46.6)	7.1 (44.8)	−3.4 (25.9)	−9.8 (14.4)	−12.1 (10.2)	−2.8 (27.0)
Record low °C (°F)	−31.4 (−24.5)	−31.9 (−25.4)	−26.6 (−15.9)	−16.8 (1.8)	−7.2 (19.0)	−4.3 (24.3)	1.3 (34.3)	1.7 (35.1)	1.1 (34.0)	−7.8 (18.0)	−27.4 (−17.3)	−30.6 (−23.1)	−31.9 (−25.4)
Average rainfall mm (inches)	192.2 (7.57)	237.1 (9.33)	224.1 (8.82)	132.3 (5.21)	82.9 (3.26)	67.9 (2.67)	83.8 (3.30)	99.4 (3.91)	68.4 (2.69)	34.8 (1.37)	54.3 (2.14)	87.7 (3.45)	1,364.8 (53.73)
Average rainy days	7.3	8.5	9.1	8.1	7.1	5.4	6.1	6.2	4.1	2.3	2.6	3.9	70.6
Average relative humidity (%) (at 17:30 IST)	55	55	50	48	49	51	62	66	60	50	46	47	53
Source: India Meteorological Department

== Gallery ==
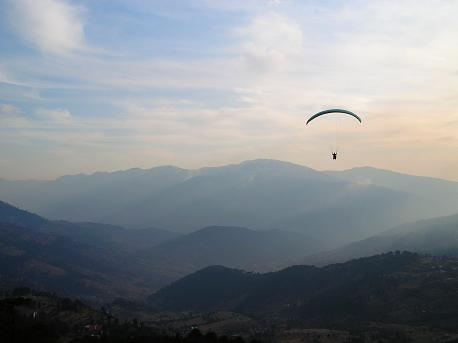
Paragliding at Patnitop

Dawariyai take off area at Patnitop

Sanasar Lake

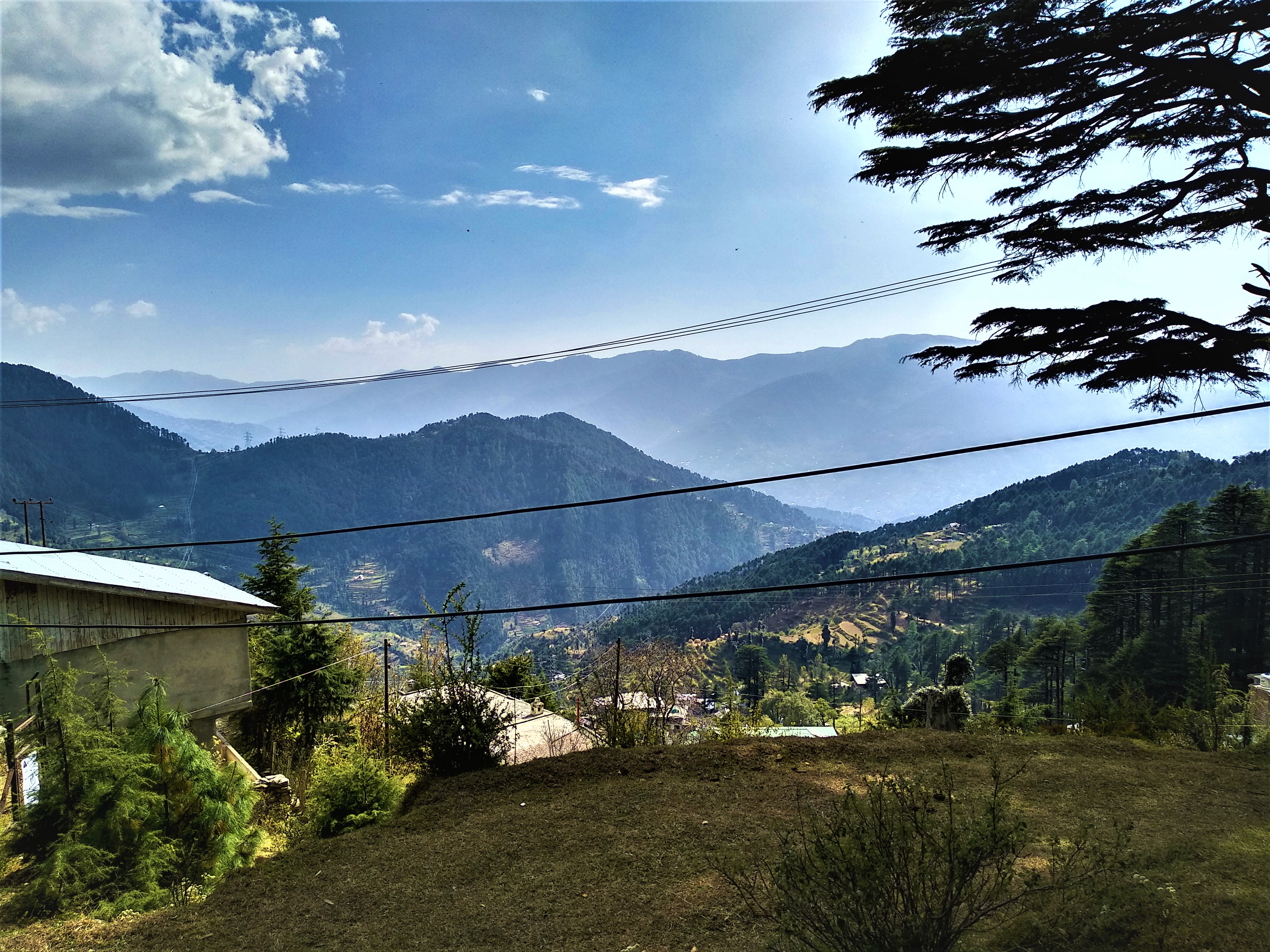
Patnitop Mountains

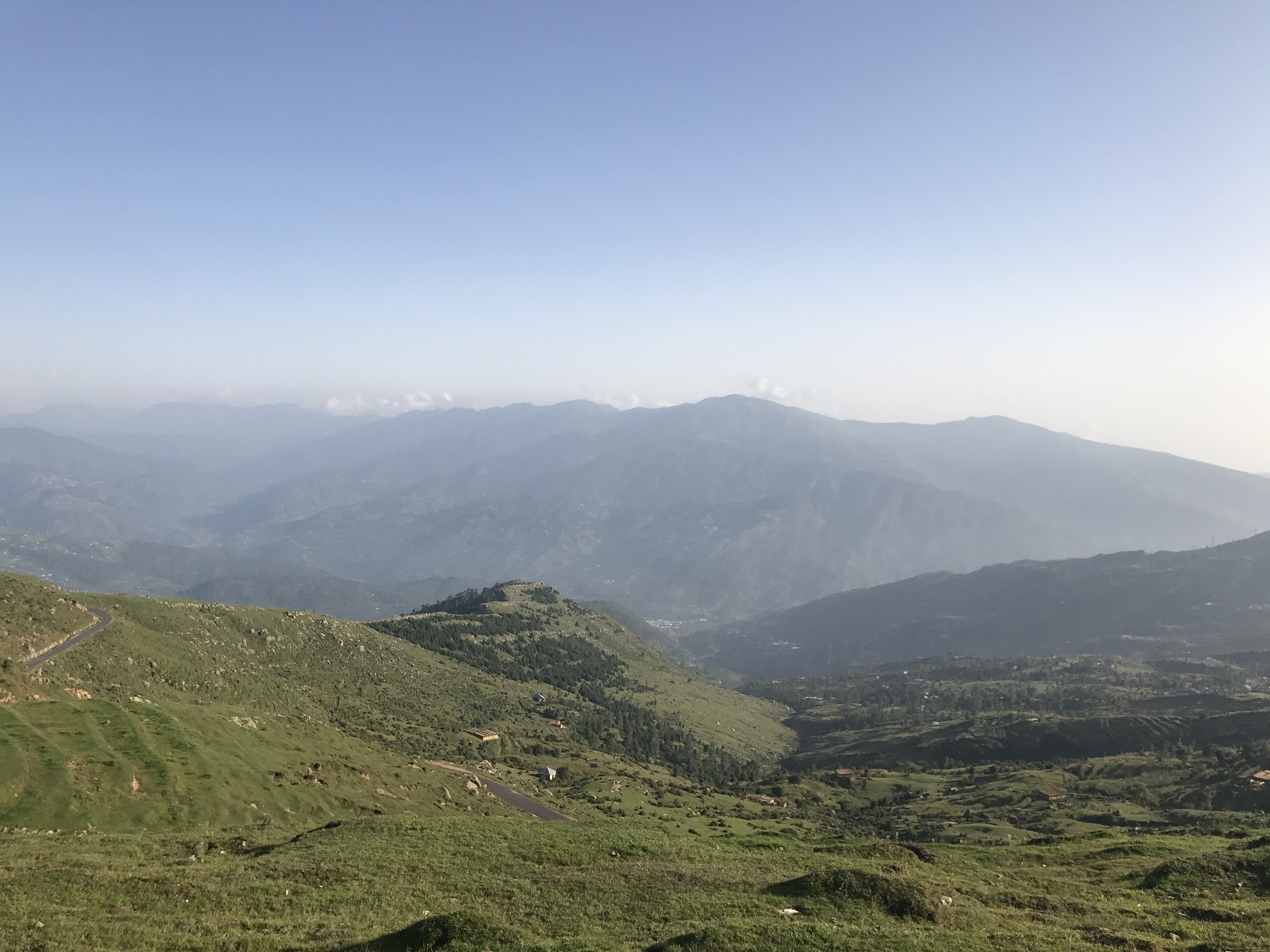
Patnitop
