= Pogali =

Indo-Aryan language of the Jammu region

- Native to: India
- Region: Ramban District, Jammu Division, Jammu and Kashmir
- Ethnicity: Pogali
- Language family: Indo-European: Indo-Iranian; Indo-Aryan; Northern Indo-Aryan or Eastern Dardic; Kashmiri; Pogali

Language codes
- ISO 639-3: hkh
- Glottolog: pogu1238 Poguli

Pogali, or Poguli is a language spoken in Jammu and Kashmir, primarily in Ramban and Chenani. It falls under the larger umbrella of Indo-Aryan languages. The language has a rich history and is characterized by its unique vocabulary and grammar, which is influenced by Western Pahari languages and the Kashmiri language, with additional influences from Persian, Rajasthani, and Sanskrit. Pogali serves as a common means of communication among both Hindu and Muslim communities in the region. Despite the linguistic variations across different areas, Pogali has remained an essential part of the local culture.

== History ==
The Pogali language is centuries old and has been well-researched by linguists both within India and abroad. Early studies on Pogali date back to the beginning of the 20th century when linguist Thomas Graham Bailey categorized it as part of the Northern Himalayan languages in his seminal work Languages of the Northern Himalayas. His extensive research laid the foundation for understanding the linguistic structure of Pogali. Bailey’s contemporary, George Grierson, included Pogali in Volume 8 of his monumental Linguistic Survey of India, identifying it as a dialect of the Western Pahari group derived from Shana.

Later, American linguist Peter Hook conducted a detailed syntactical study of Pogali, emphasizing its complex structure and its close relationship with Kashmiri syntax. Hook described Pogali as a branch of Indo-Aryan Western Pahari Hindi dialects. Despite some criticisms of his work on Pogali pronunciation, his research remains pivotal in understanding the language's grammatical structure.

The linguistic composition of Pogali is unique, with approximately 75% of its vocabulary derived from Kashmiri, while the remaining 25% is a fusion of Persian, Rajasthani, and Sanskrit influences. The language serves as a cultural bridge between Hindus and Muslims in the region, with both communities speaking the dialect seamlessly.

The preservation of Pogali has attracted the attention of linguists from Western countries and the European Union. Numerous scholars and writers have documented the language's importance. Dr. Magroob Banihali frequently highlighted Pogali in his research articles, while Pritam Krishna Koul mentioned it in his Hindi book Chandrabhaga Ki Tatwati Boliyaan. Munira Fatima authored Kashrch Qadeem t Ahm Boli Pogali, and Wali Muhammad Aseer referenced the dialect in Tasveer Zilla Doda.

Further notable contributions include Muhammad Iqbal Naik's Pogali Ka Sootyati Nizaam, Moulana Mohd Ismail Asri's Tareeq Pogal Paristan, and Sh. Devi Dass Thakur’s autobiography Yaadon Kay Chiraag, which celebrates the language's essence. DC Sharma briefly mentioned the dialect in History and Culture of Kishtwar.

Despite being spoken in diverse regions, Pogali exhibits slight variations in ascent and vocabulary every eight kilometers, as noted by Peter Hook. The people of Pogal and surrounding areas have diligently preserved the language, safeguarding its linguistic and cultural heritage for future generations.

== Linguistic classification ==
Pogali is classified under the Indo-Aryan Dardic language family as a dialect of Kashmiri. It also exhibits some characteristics of Western Pahadi languages. The dialect is strongly influenced by Sarazi, with additional linguistic elements from Persian, Rajasthani, and Sanskrit. These influences have shaped Pogali’s unique vocabulary and syntax, making it a distinct dialect within the broader Kashmiri language group.

== Geographic distribution ==
Pogali is primarily spoken in the Ramban district of Jammu and Kashmir, particularly in areas such as Neel, Ramsu, Khari,Banihal, Ramban, Pogal Paristan, Batote, and Chenani a Tehsil of Udhampur.Additionally, there is a village in Laar Reasi district where the dialect is spoken. Over time, Pogali speakers have migrated to other regions of Jammu, Udhampur, and Srinagar, as well as to various parts of India, where the language continues to be spoken by descendants of these communities.

== Phonology ==
Pogali phonology is characterized by its distinctive use of sounds, including certain unique pronunciations. Below are some examples of common Pogali words and their phonetic representations. Pogali features a set of consonants and vowels common to many Indo-Aryan languages. It includes both voiced and voiceless sounds, with the notable use of aspirated sounds such as [ʰ].

1. T'rehh (Thirsty)
*Example sentence:*
- Mehh T'rehh Lagmith – "I'm feeling thirsty."
- Yaes T'rehh Lagmith – "He is feeling thirsty."
- Sa(e)rni T'rehh Lamith – "They are feeling thirsty."

2. Add'li (Bone) –
3. Chaasht (Spoon) –
4. Giyu (House) –
5. Barr (Door) –
6. Kaaliz (Heart) –
7. Kiڑimni (Ant) –
8. Bucs (Insect) –

=== Tone and intonation ===
Pogali language has a melodic intonation, and stress often falls on the first syllable of a word."T'rehh" and "Add'li" gives them a distinctive phonetic character. The use of "T'rehh" for thirst is notable, as the double "hh" sound is a feature that distinguished.

== Literature ==
Pogali is a centuries-old language that has been well-documented and researched in various historical books, but more depend on oral literature. Some significant publications on Pogali language include:

Linguistic Survey of India (Volume 8) by George Grierson – This book categorizes Pogali as a dialect under the Western Pahari language group and offers insights into its phonology and grammar. Languages of the Northern Himalayas by Thomas Graham Bailey – Bailey's work explores the languages of the Northern Himalayas, including Pogali, and discusses its place within the regional linguistic landscape. Pogali Syntax in the Light of Kashmiri by Peter Hook This publication delves into the syntax of the Pogali language, drawing comparisons with Kashmiri. Chandrabhaga ki Tatwati Boliyaan by Pritam Krishna Koul – A Hindi book that mentions the Pogali language and provides context on its place within the local dialects. Qashrch Qadeem T Ahm Boli Pogali by Munira Fatima – A detailed book dedicated to the Pogali language, exploring its roots, history, and importance. Tasveer Zilla Doda by Wali Muhammad Aseer – A book that frequently mentions the Pogali language in relation to the Doda region. Pogali Ka Sootyati Nizaam by Muhammad Iqbal Naik – This book offers a detailed study of the Pogali language and its social system. Tareeq Pogal Paristan by Moulana Mohd Ismail Asri – A historical reference that mentions the Pogali language in the context of the Pogal region's history. Yaado Kay Chiraag by Sh. Devi Dass Thakur – An autobiography that references the essence and beauty of the Pogali language and its speakers. History and Culture of Kishtwar by DC Sharma– This book includes a brief mention of the Pogali dialect as part of the cultural and historical overview of Kishtwar.

=== Oral literature ===
Pogali has a rich tradition of oral literature, including folk songs and stories. The local folk songs, referred to as "raag", are often performed during gatherings and functions. These songs typically feature a main singer accompanied by harmonium or other musical instruments. Oral storytelling is also a significant aspect of the Pogali cultural heritage, with stories passed down through generations.

== Bibliography ==
- Kaul, Pritam Krishen (2006). Pahāṛi and Other Tribal Dialects of Jammu. Vol. 1. Delhi: Eastern Book Linkers. ISBN 8178541017.
