= Ramban district =

- District of Jammu and Kashmir administered by India
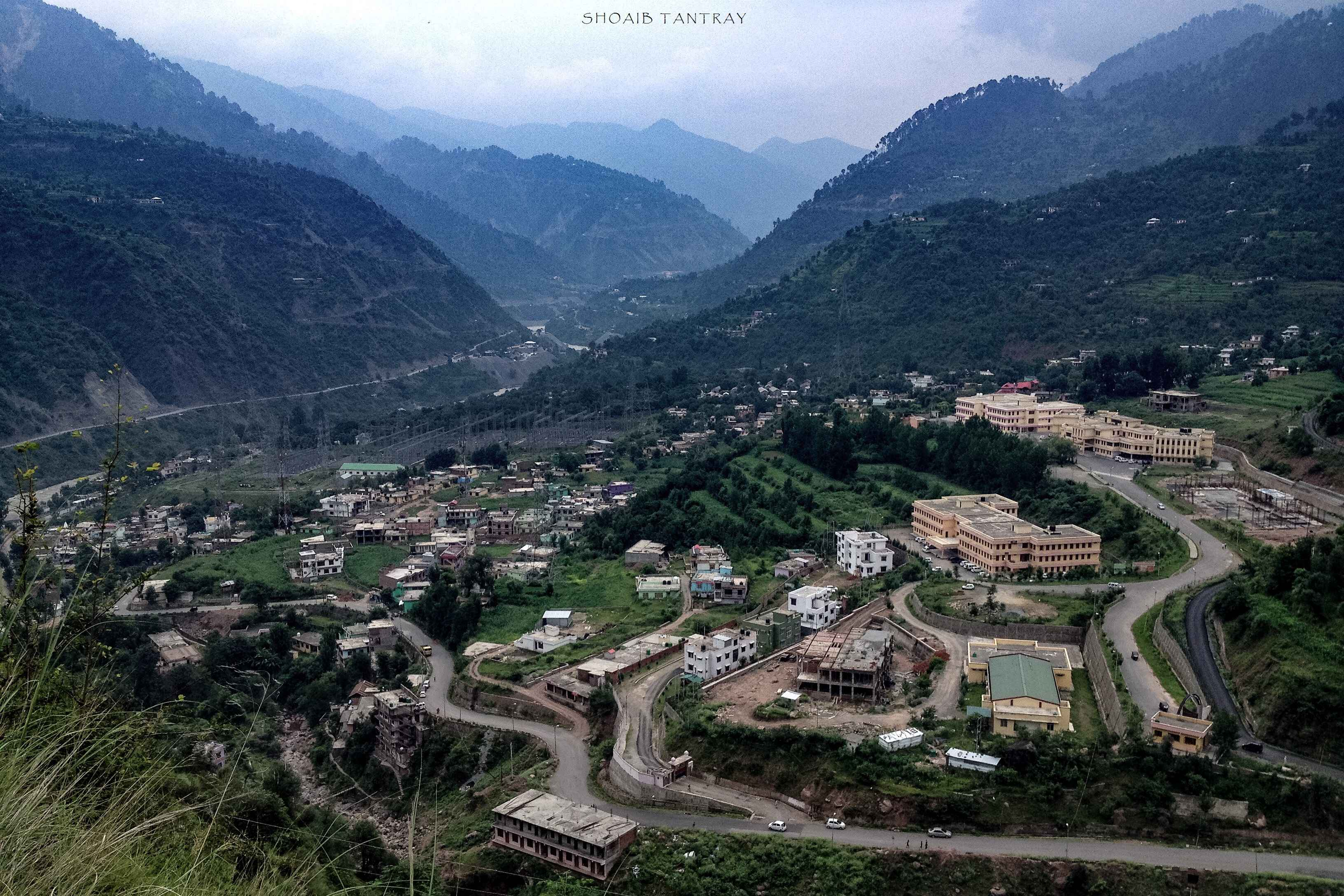
- View of Ramban
- Interactive map of Ramban district
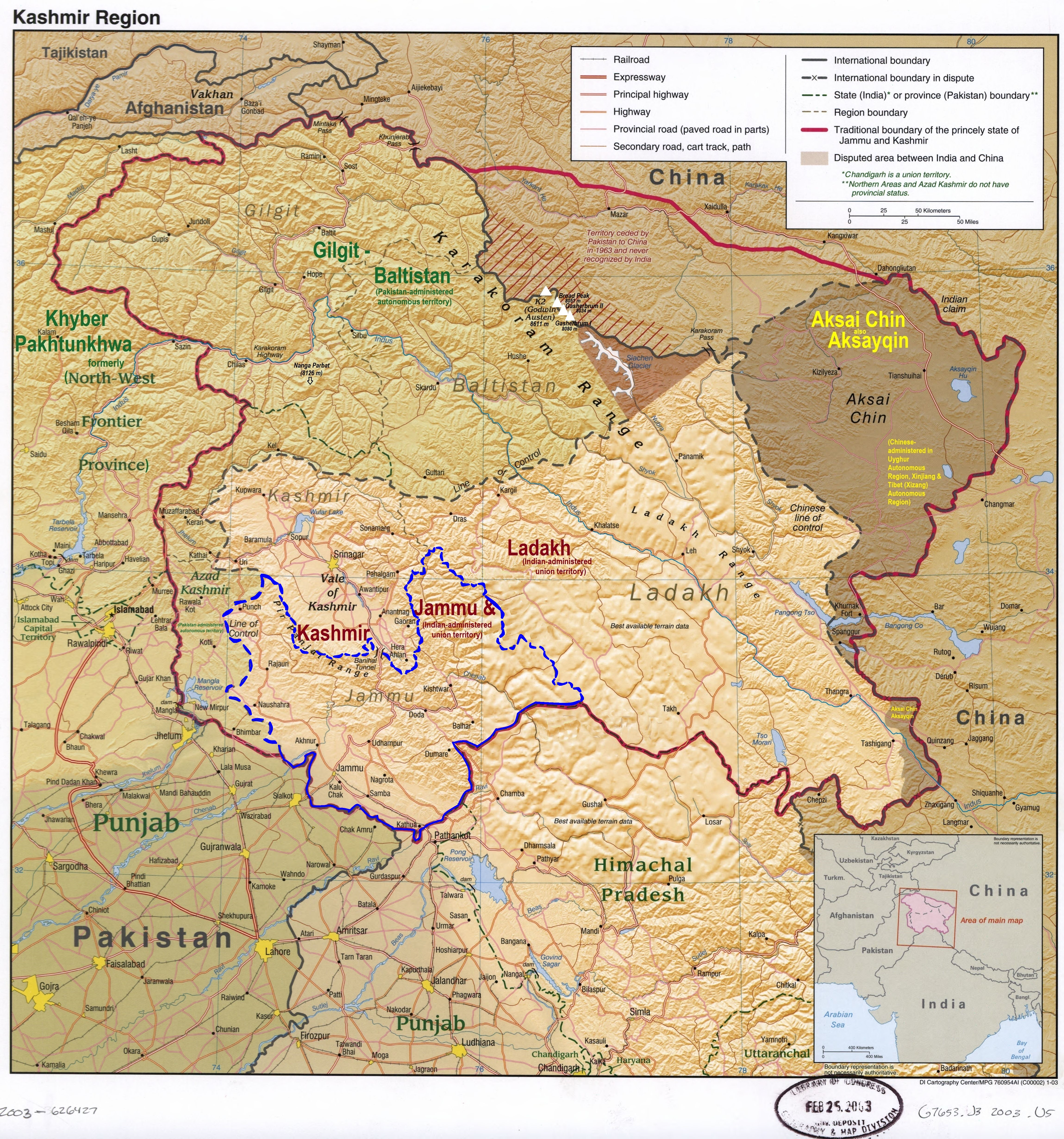
- Ramban district is in the Jammu division (shown with neon blue boundary) of Indian-administered Jammu and Kashmir (shaded in tan in the Kashmir region of India
- Coordinates (Ramban): 33.24°N 75.24°E
- Administering country: India
- Union Territory: Jammu and Kashmir
- Division: Jammu
- Parliamentary Constituency: Udhampur
- Headquarters: Ramban
- Tehsils: Banihal; Ramban; Khari; Rajgarh; Batote; Gool; Pogal Paristan; Ramsoo

Area
  - Total: 1,329 km^{2} (513 sq mi)

Population (2011)
  - Total: 283,713
  - Density: 213.5/km^{2} (552.9/sq mi)
  - Urban: 4.16%

Demographics
  - Literacy: 54.27%
  - Sex ratio: 902

Languages
  - Official: Dogri, Kashmiri, Urdu, Hindi, English
  - Spoken: Kashmiri, Pogali, Dogri, Gujari, Pahari, Sarazi
- Time zone: UTC+05:30 (IST)
- Vehicle registration: JK-19
- Major highways: NH-44
- Website: ramban.gov.in

Ramban district is an administrative district in the Jammu division of Jammu and Kashmir in the disputed Kashmir region. It is located in a valley surrounded the Pir Panjal range. It was carved out as a separate district from erstwhile Doda district in 2007. It is located in the Jammu division. The district headquarters are at Ramban town, which is located midway between Jammu and Srinagar on the banks of the Chenab river on National Highway-44, approximately 151 km from Jammu and Srinagar.

== Geography ==
Ramban district is 1,156 metres (3,792 feet) above sea level (on average). The boundary lines of Ramban district encompass hill station Patnitop as its southernmost point, Assar on its eastern edge, Gool to the west, and Banihal to the north. The terrain of district Ramban is tough and hilly. District Ramban shares its boundary with Reasi, Udhampur, Doda, Anantnag and Kulgam districts.

=== Climate ===
The climate of the district varies according to altitude. The temperature rises as high as 42 °C in the low-lying areas like Ramban town located in between steep mountains on the banks of Chenab River and drops to sub-zero in high-altitude areas like Sangaldan, Gool, Dhagantop, Asthanmarg, Lalagundi, Budhan, Pogal, Paristan, Neel. The working season in most of the district is about eight months because of weather conditions in the district.

== Demographics ==
=== Population ===
Historical populations
| Year | Pop. | ±% |
|---|---|---|
| 1901 | 46,580 | — |
| 1911 | 50,305 | +8.0% |
| 1921 | 51,062 | +1.5% |
| 1931 | 57,361 | +12.3% |
| 1941 | 61,720 | +7.6% |
| 1951 | 71,242 | +15.4% |
| 1961 | 80,764 | +13.4% |
| 1971 | 105,767 | +31.0% |
| 1981 | 130,569 | +23.4% |
| 1991 | 168,962 | +29.4% |
| 2001 | 214,944 | +27.2% |
| 2011 | 283,713 | +32.0% |
source: † 1951 and 1991 populations are estimated

According to the 2011 census, Ramban district has a population of 283,713. roughly equal to the nation of Barbados. This gives it a ranking of 573rd in India (out of a total of 640). The district has a population density of 213 inhabitants per square kilometre (550/sq mi) . Its population growth rate over the decade 2001-2011 was 31.81%.

=== Social groups ===
Kashmiris, Pogalis and Gujjars are three major ethnic groups of the Ramban district. Kashmiris make of 34.74%, Pogalis 17.12, and Gujjars 12.19% in district's total population. There are also Pahari and Dogra people in Ramban.

=== Language ===
Languages of Ramban district (2011)
1. Kashmiri (34.7%)
2. Pogali (17.1%)
3. Gujari (12.2%)
4. Dogri (10.2%)
5. Pahadi (9.25%)
6. Sarazi (5.94%)
7. Nepali (3.64%)
8. Hindi (1.24%)
9. 'Other' Hindi (0.96%)
10. Gaddi (0.96%)
11. Haryanvi (0.91%)
12. Others (2.80%)

Kashmiri, Pogali, Gujari and Dogri are the major languages spoken in Ramban district. Kashmiri is the largest language in the district, mainly spoken by Kashmiri Muslims. Second major language is Poguli spoken in the Pogal Paristan area of Banihal. Gujari is the 3rd most widely spoken language in Ramban it is mainly spoken by the Muslim Gurjars and Bakarwals. In the Ramban tehsil, Dogri and Western Pahari languages such as Sarazi are spoken. Dogri is the majority language in Batote.

=== Religion ===
Religion in Ramban district (2011)
| Religion | Percent |
| Islam | 70.68% |
| Hinduism | 28.56% |
| Other or not stated | 0.76% |

Muslims are in majority with nearly 70%, while Hindus are 28%.

| Tehsil | Muslim | Hindu | Others |
|---|---|---|---|
| Banihal | 87.17 | 12.33 | 0.48 |
| Ramban | 57.67 | 41.34 | 0.98 |

=== Sex ratio & literacy rate ===
Ramban has a sex ratio of 902 females for every 1000 males, and a literacy rate of 54.27%. 4.16% of the population lives in urban areas. Scheduled Castes and Scheduled Tribes make up 4.91% and 14.02% of the population respectively.

Sex Ratio in Ramban District in 2011 Census. (no. females per 1,000 males)
| Religion (and population) | Sex Ratio |
| Muslim (pop 200,516) | 927 |
| Hindu (pop 81,026) | 848 |
| Other (pop 2,171) | 794 |
| Total (pop 283,713) | 902 |

Ramban district: religion, gender ratio, and % urban of population, according to the 2011 Census.
| | Hindu | Muslim | Christian | Sikh | Buddhist | Jain | Other | Not stated | Total |
|---|---|---|---|---|---|---|---|---|---|
| Total | 81,026 | 200,516 | 414 | 753 | 43 | 3 | 252 | 706 | 283,713 |
| Total | 28.56% | 70.68% | 0.15% | 0.27% | 0.02% | 0.00% | 0.09% | 0.25% | 100.00% |
| Male | 43,844 | 104,078 | 253 | 427 | 24 | 2 | 132 | 372 | 149,132 |
| Female | 37,182 | 96,438 | 161 | 326 | 19 | 1 | 120 | 334 | 134,581 |
| Gender ratio (% female) | 45.9% | 48.1% | 38.9% | 43.3% | 44.2% | 33.3% | 47.6% | 47.3% | 47.4% |
| Sex ratio (no. of females per 1,000 males) | 848 | 927 | – | 763 | – | – | – | 898 | 902 |
| Urban | 5,087 | 6,224 | 70 | 405 | 1 | 1 | 1 | 22 | 11,811 |
| Rural | 75,939 | 194,292 | 344 | 348 | 42 | 2 | 251 | 684 | 271,902 |
| % Urban | 6.3% | 3.1% | 16.9% | 53.8% | 2.3% | 33.3% | 0.4% | 3.1% | 4.2% |

== Administration ==
Ramban District is divided into eight tehsils: Banihal, Ramban, Khari, Rajgarh, Batote, Gool, Pogal Paristan (Ukhral) and Ramsoo.

Each tehsil has its tehsildar, who is the administrative head. The district consisted of 116 census villages and 127 revenue villages in 2001. The total number of panchayat Halqas in the district was 124.

=== District Development Council Ramban ===
In the elections for Ramban's District Development Council, Shamshad Begum was elected chairman and Rabiya Beigh was elected vice-chairman.

== Politics ==
Ramban district has two assembly constituencies: Ramban and Banihal.

On 21 January 2021, Ramban district was declared a 'terrorist free' district in Jammu and Kashmir.

== Major projects ==
- Baglihar Dam
- Pir Panjal Railway Tunnel
- Banihal Qazigund Road Tunnel
- Dr. Syama Prasad Mookerjee Tunnel
- Sangaldan-Ramban Railway Station

== See also ==
- Adhwa
- Baglihar Dam
- Banihal
- Banihal Pass
- Chanderkot
- Chenab Valley
- Doda District
- Jammu and Kashmir
- Badshah Khan (wrestler)
- Maitra
- Pir Panjal Range
- Ramban
- Sangaldan
