= Bhalla, Jammu and Kashmir =

Village in Jammu & Kashmir, India

Bhalla
- Village/Tehsil
- Location in Jammu & Kashmir, India
- Coordinates: 33.0676862°N 75.61321°E
- Country: India
- Union Territory: Jammu & Kashmir
- Division: Jammu
- Region: Chenab Valley
- District: Doda
- Demonym(s): Kashmiri, Bhaderwahi, Gojri

Languages
  - Spoken: Bhadarwahi, Kashmiri, Gojari, Hindi-Urdu
- Time zone: UTC+5:30 (IST)
- PIN: 182221
- Tehsildar: Manjeet Singh Katal

Bhalla is a village and tehsil of Doda district in the Chenab Valley of the Jammu division of Jammu and Kashmir, India. Bhalla is located about 15 kilometres from Doda and 25 kilometres from Bhaderwah on the Doda-Bhaderwah Highway.

== Demographics ==
Bhalla is a tehsil in Bhaderwah sub district of Doda district. There are 17 panchayats in Bhalla tehsil.

S.No.	Panchayats
1	Berreru
2	Choundary
3	Derka
4	Dugli A
5	Dugli B
6	Gajoth
7	Ghuraka
8	Kahri Chattra
9	Khellani
10	Panjgraine
11	Pranoo
12	Rewara
13	Shangroo
14	Sindra
15	Soura
16	Southa
17	Trown

=== Kellar valley ===
Kellar valley is located in Bhalla tehsil. It is a bowl-shaped valley with the Himalayas surrounding it on all sides, and its borders are with Bani-Basohli on the south, Bhaderwah on the east, Marmat, and Sudhmahadev on the west. The middle Himalayan ranges, also known locally as the Devshetra, Chander, and Taaliyan Mountains, guard the valley. The major Dhars in these mountains include Seoj Dhar, Bhaihal Dhar, and Kemel Dhar. These Dhars are surrounded by a thick surface of green meadows and tall Sal, Deodar, and spruce trees. These Dhars are the origin of several significant rivers in the Jammu region, including Tawi and Ujh.
