= Saraz region =

Region in Jammu & Kashmir, India

Saraz Saraj or Siraj
- Region
- Location within Jammu and Kashmir
- Coordinates: 33.173996°N 75.711074°E
- Country: India
- Union Territory: Jammu and Kashmir
- Areas (Located in Saraz): Mahalla; Breswana; Doda; Dessa; Kulhand; Rajgarh; Ganika; Bhagwa; Kashtigarh; Koti; Bijarani; Malwana; Bhalwana; Jodhpur; Dhara; Babor; Jatheli; Bharat; Udayanpur

Saraz or Siraj is a hilly region in the eastern part of the Jammu division of Jammu and Kashmir in northern India. Historically a pargana within the erstwhile state of Kishtwar, the region currently takes up the northern half of Doda district and parts of neighbouring Ramban and Kishtwar districts. Its population in 2011 stood at 180,000 people. The region is defined mainly on the basis of linguistics where the majority of people speak Sarazi as their mother tongue.

== Demographics ==
Saraz is a rural area located on the right bank of the Chenab river, including its district headquarters, Doda district. The areas on the left bank of river are geographically located in Bhaderwah area. The northern side of Doda district borders with the erstwhile Anantnag district of the Kashmir region.

Saraz is a large area, known for the Sarazi dialect spoken there. The primary native language in the region is Sarazi. It is widely spoken as a lingua franca alongside Hindi/Urdu, but as a first language it is primarily associated with the Hindu population. Most Muslims speak of Kashmiri; some Muslim communities speak Sarazi, Gojri or Watali, but many of them have shifted to Kashmiri in recent generations, and even those who retain the language still use Kashmiri as a second language. A minority of people also know Dogri. The languages of administration and education are Urdu and English.

== History ==
In the past, Doda was largely inhabited by a Sarazi population before people started settling there from Kashmir and other adjoining areas. Historians disagree as to why the Kashmiri population settled in Saraz during the 17th and 18th centuries. However, Sumantra Bose says it was repression by the feudal classes elsewhere that drew people to Doda, Ramban and Kishtwar.

== See also ==
- Sarazi language, native language of Saraz region
