= Kandhote =

Village in Jammu and Kashmir

- Village
- Kandote in Jammu and Kashmir, India
- Coordinates: 33.144813°N 75.722607°E
- Country: India
- Union territory: Jammu and Kashmir
- Region: Jammu region
- District: Doda

Population (2011)
  - Total: 800
- Demonym: Bhaderwahi

Language
  - Spoken: Bhaderwahi Sarazi, Kashmiri
  - Official: Urdu
- Time zone: UTC+5:30 (IST)
- Postal code: 182203

Kandhote is a village in the Doda district of the Jammu and Kashmir union territory of India. The climate in Kandhote mild. There are the variety of spring water. The main crops grown here are corn, wheat, rice, pulses etc. The place is also known for its fruits mainly like apples, oranges, pears, apricots, aalo-bhukhaara. Walnuts are in huge demand. There are so nice picnic spots but mainly due to incomplete road connectivity people don't know much about the place.
