= Manjmi =

Village in Jammu and Kashmir

- Village
- Manjmi in Jammu and Kashmir, India
- Coordinates: 33.287802°N 75.451153°E
- Country: India
- Union territory: Jammu and Kashmir
- Region: Jammu region
- District: Doda
- Demonym: Sarazi

Language
  - Spoken: Kashmiri, Sarazi, Gojri
  - Official: Urdu
- Time zone: UTC+5:30 (IST)
- Postal code: 182202

Manjmi is a village in the Bhagwa tehsil of Doda district in Jammu and Kashmir union territory of India. As of 2019, there is no road connectivity, electricity or health facilities.

== Etymology ==
Manjmi word is derived from Gojri language means Central. As it is a central village in Dessa area.

== About ==
Manjmi village is located in the hilly mountainous area of Dessa. As of 2018, it is deprived of many basic facilities for which residents protested for raising their demands. Manjmi and nearby areas possess natural beauty.
