= Bhal Padri =

Hill Station in Jammu and Kashmir

Bhal Padri Bal Padri
- Hill Station
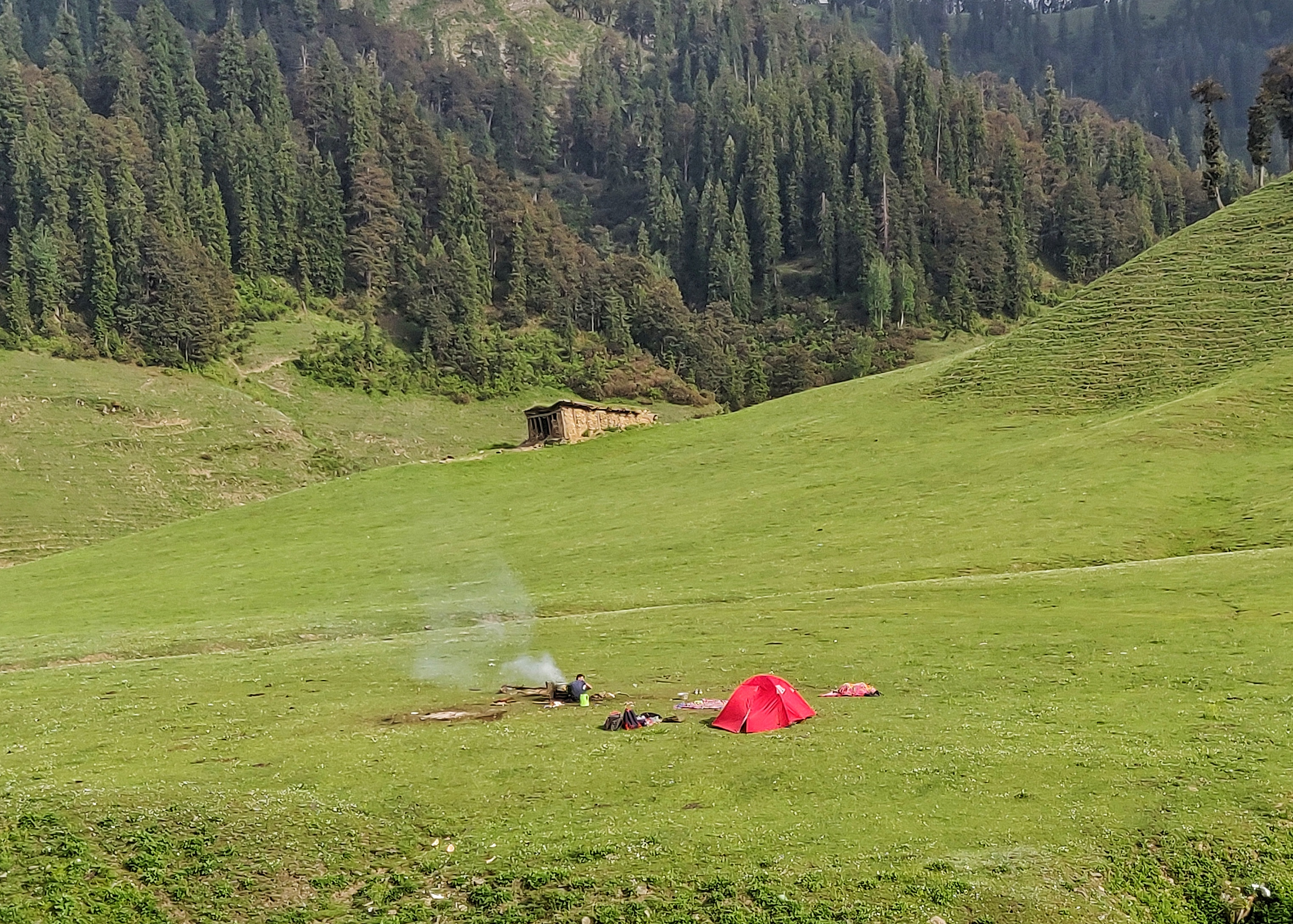
- Bhal Padri is a natural landscape in Bhalessa

- Bhal Padri in Doda, Jammu and Kashmir, India
- Coordinates: 32.943901°N 75.841578°E
- Country: India
- State: Jammu and Kashmir
- District: Doda
- Tehsil: Gandoh (Bhalessa)
- Elevation: 3,400 m (11,000 ft)

Languages
  - Official: Urdu

Languages
  - Local: Kashmiri, Urdu, Gojri, Bhalessi, Bhaderwahi

Bhal Padri (Kashmiri; Bal Padri) is a hill station situated above a group of small valleys covered with a dense forest located in the Changa, Bhalessa. area of Doda district. It borders Padri Pass, (Note: Padri Pass or Padri Top is tourist attraction located on Bhaderwah-Himachal Pradesh road) Bhaderwah at a distance of 4 kilometres (2.5 mi) northeast. Rivulets and streams flow through this valley.

== Etymology ==
The name Bhal Padri is derived from the words, Bhal, which stands for Bhalessa, and Padri, the name of a nearby location popularly known as Padri Pass or Padri Top.

== About ==
Bhal Padri village is located to the northeast of Padri Pass, the highest point on the Bhaderwah-Chamba road. Bhalessa is the nearest village on the northwestern side. People residing there belong to the Gujjar community and live in mud houses without electricity. They use solar-powered lights.

== Tourism ==
Bhal Padri is situated above a group of small valleys, at an elevation of 11,000 feet (3,400 m) above sea level. The landscape around it is characterised by streams flowing through meadows, surrounded dense forest. The area is popular for trekking, as the town of Bhaderwah is located only 4 kilometres (2.5 mi) to the southwest.

== Route ==
Bhal Padri is located 66 kilometres (41 mi) from the headquarters of Doda district. It is known to be the connecting link between Bhaderwah and Bhalessa. It is not directly connected to any roads. However, nearby roads include the Bhaderwah-Chamba road and the Gandoh-Khilotran road. The Bhaderwah-Chamba road at Padri leads to a path by which one may reach Bhal Padri after a 10–15 kilometres (6.2–9.3 mi) walk. The Gandoh-Khilotran road is 12 kilometres (7.5 mi) from Bhal Padri on foot.

The route starts from the nearest airport and provincial headquarters at Jammu.

The road starts from Jammu—Batote (via NH1A), changing route from Batote—Thathri (via NH244) and turning right near Thathri-Kishtwar Bridge towards Thathri—Khilotran Highway till the Khilotran area of Gandoh Bhalessa, a footpath is found that leads the travellers to Bhal Padri.
