= Bharat Bagla =

Village in Jammu and Kashmir

- Village/Tehsil
- Bharat Bagla in Jammu and Kashmir, India
- Coordinates: 33.2519986°N 75.5057719°E
- Country: India
- Union Territory: Jammu and Kashmir
- Division: Jammu
- Region: Chenab Valley
- District: Doda
- Demonym(s): Kashmiri, Sarazi, Gojri

Languages
  - Spoken: Kashmiri, Gojari, Bhadarwahi, Urdu
- Time zone: UTC+5:30 (IST)
- PIN: 182202
- Tehsildar: Shabir Ahmed

Bharat Bagla or Bagla Bharat is a village and tehsil of Doda district in the union territory of Jammu and Kashmir. Bharat Bagla is one of the far flung area in Doda district.

== Demographics ==
Bharat Bagla is a tehsil in Bhaderwah sub district of Doda district. There are 9 panchayats and 1 block in Bharat Bagla tehsil.

S.No.	Block	Panchayat
1	DALI UDHYANPUR	Bagla
2	DALI UDHYANPUR	Bharath A
3	DALI UDHYANPUR	Bharath B
4	DALI UDHYANPUR	Dhar B
5	DALI UDHYANPUR	Kalihand
6	DALI UDHYANPUR	Kulhand
7	DALI UDHYANPUR	Seel
8	DALI UDHYANPUR	Udhiyanpur
9	DALI UDHYANPUR	Ugad

== History ==
Bharat Bagla tehsil was created in 2014 along with 10 new tehsils for Doda district. It was one of the 659 new administrative units which includes 135 tehsils, 46 sub divisions, 177 CD blocks and 301 nayabats. Bharat and Bagla are actually two different villages that fall under the Rural Development Department's block Dali Udyanpur. Bharat is again split into two panchayats, viz., Bharat A and Bharat B.
