= Gatha, Bhaderwah =

Village in Jammu and Kashmir

Gatha Fish Pond Bhaderwah
- Village
- Location in Jammu and Kashmir, India Gatha (India)
- Coordinates: 33.000835°N 75.702818°E
- Country: India
- Union Territory: Jammu and Kashmir
- District: Doda
- Tehsil: Bhaderwah
- Parliamentary Constituency: Udhampur

Government
  - Type: Panchayat Raj

Population (2011)
  - Total: 2,008

Languages
  - Spoken: Kashmiri, Bhaderwahi and Urdu

Gatha (known for Fish Pond Bhaderwah) is a village located in the Bhaderwah Tehsil in the Doda district of the Indian-administered union territory of Jammu and Kashmir.

== Demographics ==
The Gatha village has a population of 2,008 according to the 2011 census. The population of children aged 0-6 is 249, accounting for 12.40% of the total population. The village exhibits an average Sex Ratio of 851, which is slightly lower than the Jammu and Kashmir state average of 889. However, the Child Sex Ratio in Gatha is 872, higher than the Jammu and Kashmir state average of 862.

Gatha village boasts a higher literacy rate compared to the overall Jammu and Kashmir statistics. In 2011, the literacy rate of Gatha village was 70.04%, in contrast to the state average of 67.16%. Male literacy in Gatha stands at 77.84%, while female literacy rate was recorded at 60.84%.

== Tourism ==
The Gatha Lake View Resorts, also known as a 'fish pond,' is a popular tourist destination in Bhaderwah which is located in Gatha village. The Bhaderwah Development Authority (BDA) is responsible for the maintenance and development of the resort.

== See also ==
- Bhaderwah
- Doda district
- Chenab Valley
- List of tourist attractions in Chenab Valley
