= Doda West Assembly constituency =

Constituency of the Jammu and Kashmir Legislative Assembly

Coordinates: 33.145°N 75.545°E

Doda West
- Constituency No. 53 for the Jammu and Kashmir Legislative Assembly

Constituency details
- Country: India
- State: Jammu and Kashmir
- District: Doda
- Lok Sabha constituency: Udhampur
- Established: 2022

Member of Legislative Assembly
- Incumbent Shakti Raj Parihar
- Party: BJP
- Alliance: NDA
- Elected year: 2024

Doda West Assembly constituency is one of the 90 constituencies in the Jammu and Kashmir Legislative Assembly of Jammu and Kashmir a north state of India. Doda West is also part of Udhampur Lok Sabha constituency. This constituency was created in 2022 after delimitation process in Jammu and Kashmir (union territory). In May 2022, the final list of new assembly constituencies was published in the gazette. The new constituency consists of Marmat, Assar, Kastigarh, and Bhagwah tehsils; Doda tehsil (part, excluding Doda), Arnora, Dhar, Doda MC, Udhyanpur (part), and Dhara PCs.

== Members of Legislative Assembly ==
Year	Member	Party
2024	Shakti Raj Parihar	Bharatiya Janata Party

== Election results ==
=== Assembly Election 2024 ===
2024 Jammu and Kashmir Legislative Assembly election : Doda West
Party	Candidate	Votes	%	±%
BJP	Shakti Raj Parihar	33,964	49.99%	New
INC	Pardeep Kumar	30,511	44.91%	New
NOTA	None of the Above	998	1.47%	New
Independent	Swarn Veer Singh Jaral	857	1.26%	New
AAP	Yasir Shafi Matto	437	0.64%	New
DPAP	Abdul Ghani	436	0.64%	New
JKPDP	Tanveer Hussain	433	0.64%	New
Margin of victory		3,453	5.08%	
Turnout		67,944	77.71%	
Registered electors		87,436		
BJP win (new seat)				

== See also ==
- Doda district
- Doda Assembly constituency
- List of constituencies of the Jammu and Kashmir Legislative Assembly
