= Lal Draman =

Hill Station in Jammu and Kashmir

- Hill Station
- Lal Draman in Jammu and Kashmir, India
- Coordinates: 33.1894440°N 75.5130560°E
- Country: India
- State: Jammu and Kashmir
- District: Doda
- Tehsil: Doda
- Elevation: 2,700 m (8,900 ft)

Languages
  - Official: Urdu

Languages
  - Local: Sarazi, Bhaderwahi, Kashmiri, Urdu, Gojri

Lal Draman (translation; Red Meadows) is a hill station in Indian union territory of Jammu and Kashmir. It is located at a distance of 25 kilometres (16 mi) north from Doda town near Sazan village, covered with lofty deodar and fir trees. A Grameen-cum-Tourism Mela (Note: Mela (Sanskrit: मेला) is a Sanskrit word meaning 'gathering' or 'to meet' or a 'fair' in which people gathered to celebrate cultural festivals. In Doda district, the mela is also known as Kod in local language.) is organised every year in Lal Draman, depicting the cultural programs of Doda district. Thousand of tourists visits there to enjoy this mela. In 2013, construction of roads started in rural areas including Lal Draman. As of 2020, there is only one 23 kilometres (14 mi) road northwest from Doda town towards Bijarni village and a 3 kilometres (1.9 mi) north by foot from Bijarni to reach the Lal Draman.

== Entomology ==
Lal Draman are two Kashmiri words: lal can mean red, and draman(dramun) means meadows.

== About ==
Lal Draman is a tourist destination located in Doda district, 23 kilometres (14 mi) north from Doda town by road and 3 kilometres (1.9 mi) further by foot. Its beautiful landscapes, number of scenic spots for picnic, pleasant summer and snow in winter are the main attractions for tourists.

== Tourism ==
Lal Draman is known for a tourist attraction in Doda district, seasonally local and foreign tourists visit there. In winters there is usually a 6–7 feet (1.8–2.1 m) snowfall for which tourists visit there for winter sports like skiing. Its beautiful landscapes, scenic picnic spots and cultural festival are the main attraction for tourists. One day Grameen-cum-Tourism Mela organised every year in summers depicting the culture of Doda district and various cultural programmes performed in Sirazi, Bhaderwahi, Kashmiri and Urdu languages while many other sports like volleyball, kabaddi, horse racing, daku dances, animal shows, and other activities also performed on that day. The small mosque and temple built next to each other in Lal Draman, are said to be symbols of unity between Muslims and Hindus.

=== Road connectivity ===
The nearest bus stop is in Bijarni village, which can be reached by a 3 kilometres (1.9 mi) walk from Lal Draman. Bijarni village is 23 kilometres (14 mi) by road from the town of Doda.
