= Bhadarwahi =

Bhadarwahi, or Bhaderwahi, most often refers to:

- Something of, from, or related to Bhaderwah, a region in the Doda district of Jammu and Kashmir, India
  - Bhadarwahi language, spoken in that region
  - Bhadarwahi people who inhabit that region
