= Bhaderwah–Chamba Road =

Highway in North India

Route information
- Length: 90 km (56 mi)

Major junctions
- From: Bhaderwah
- To: Chamba

Location
- Country: India
- States: Jammu and Kashmir; Himachal Pradesh
- Primary destinations: Bhaderwah - Padri Pass - Chamba

Highway system
- Roads in India; Expressways; National; State; Asian

The Bhaderwah–Chamba Road is an interstate link road that connects the Indian states of Jammu and Kashmir and Himachal Pradesh. The road runs through the valleys and mountains of the western Himalayas, providing a transportation link between the two states.

The Bhaderwah–Chamba Road begins in the town of Bhaderwah in the Doda district of Jammu and Kashmir and runs for approximately 90 kilometres (56 mi) through the rugged terrain of the western Himalayas before ending in the town of Chamba in Himachal Pradesh. Along the way, the road passes through several small villages and towns, providing access to essential services and amenities for the local population.

The Bhaderwah–Chamba Road is an important transportation link for the people of both Jammu and Kashmir and Himachal Pradesh, as it connects several remote and isolated areas to the rest of the country. The road is also a popular destination for tourists, and various tourist destinations fall near this road, including Padri Pass.
