= Bhella tehsil =

Subdivision in Jammu and Kashmir

Bhella
- Tehsil
- Bhella
- Location in Jammu and Kashmir, India
- Coordinates: 33.131747°N 75.667863°E
- Country: India
- Union territory: Jammu and Kashmir
- Division: Jammu
- Region: Chenab Valley
- District: Doda

Population (2011)
  - Total: 1,657

Language
  - Spoken: Kashmiri, Bhaderwahi, Gojri
  - Official: Urdu
- Pin Code: 182201
- Tehsildar: Parvaiz Ahmed

Bhella is a tehsil in the Doda district of Jammu and Kashmir. It was previously part of the Thathri tehsil. In 2022, Bhella became the part of Bhaderwah Assembly constituency.
