= Gundna =

- Tehsil
- Location in Jammu and Kashmir, India Gundna (India)
- Coordinates: 33.26°N 75.54°E
- Country: India
- Union Territory: Jammu and Kashmir
- District: Doda

Population (2011)
  - Total: 1,478

Languages
  - Spoken: Hindi, Kashmiri, Urdu
- Time zone: UTC+5:30 (IST)
- PIN: 182202
- DDC Member: Adv Asim Hashmi (Jammu and Kashmir National Conference)
- BDC Chairperson: Sarshad Nisar Natnoo

Gundna is a village in Doda district of the Indian union territory of Jammu and Kashmir. The village is located just 40 kilometres from the district headquarters Doda.

== Demographics ==
According to the 2011 census of India, Gundna has 366 households. The literacy rate of Gundna village was 53.18% compared to 67.16% of Jammu and Kashmir. In Gundna, Male literacy stands at 70.42% while the female literacy rate was 35.99%.

Demographics (2011 Census)
	Total	Male	Female
Population	1478	754	724
Children aged below 6 years	252	142	110
Scheduled caste	0	0	0
Scheduled tribe	0	0	0
Literacy	53.18%	70.42%	35.99%
Workers (all)	527	347	180
Main workers (total)	196	–	–
Marginal workers (total)	331	169	162

== Transport ==
=== Road ===
Gundna is directly connected by road. In order to travel from Doda to Gundna, one has to travel by the Road via Ghat Bhabore Dhara road.

=== Rail ===
The nearest major railway station to Gundna is Udhampur Railway Station located at a distance of 131 kilometres respectively.

=== Air ===
The nearest airport to Gundna is Jammu Airport located at a distance of 190 kilometres and is a 5.5-hour drive.
