= Chattergala Pass =

Mountain pass in Jammu and Kashmir, India

- Location within Jammu and Kashmir
- Elevation: 3,200 metres (10,500 ft)
- Traversed by: Bhaderwah-Bani-Basohli road

Third Approach
- Location: India
- Range: Middle Himalayas
- Coordinates: 32°52′36″N 75°43′51″E

Chattergala Pass is a mountain pass (elevation 3,200 m (10,500 ft)) in the Middle Himalayas of the Jammu region of Jammu and Kashmir, India, connecting the town of Bhaderwah in the Neeru river valley with Basohli in the Shiwalik hills. Chattergala Tunnel is planned under the pass.

== Tunnel ==
Chattergala Tunnel, a 6.8 km long road tunnel under the Chattergala Pass, is planned to connect Kathua and Doda via Bani. It will provide all-weather road connectivity and reduce the travel time from Lakhanpur to Doda to four hours. Once the construction begins, the Rs. 4,000 crore tunnel is expected to be completed in about four years.
