= Assar =

Tehsil and Subdivision in Jammu and Kashmir

- Village/Tehsil/Subdivision
- Assar
- Location in Indian-administered Jammu and Kashmir
- Coordinates: 33.126579°N 75.414529°E
- Country: India
- States and union territories of India: Jammu and Kashmir
- Division: Jammu
- Region: Chenab Valley
- District: Doda

Population (2011)
  - Total: 1,599

Language
  - Spoken: Kashmiri, Bhaderwahi, Gojri Rudhari, Khashali
  - Official: Urdu
- Pin Code: 182143
- Sub-Divisional Magistrate: Lekh Raj (KAS)
- BDC Chairperson: Sulakshna Devi
- Tehsildar: Fareed Ahmed Sheikh

Assar is a tehsil (sub division) in Doda district of Jammu and Kashmir. In 2022, Assar became the part of Doda West Assembly constituency.
