= Sonbain Ashapati =

Mountain in Jammu and Kashmir, India

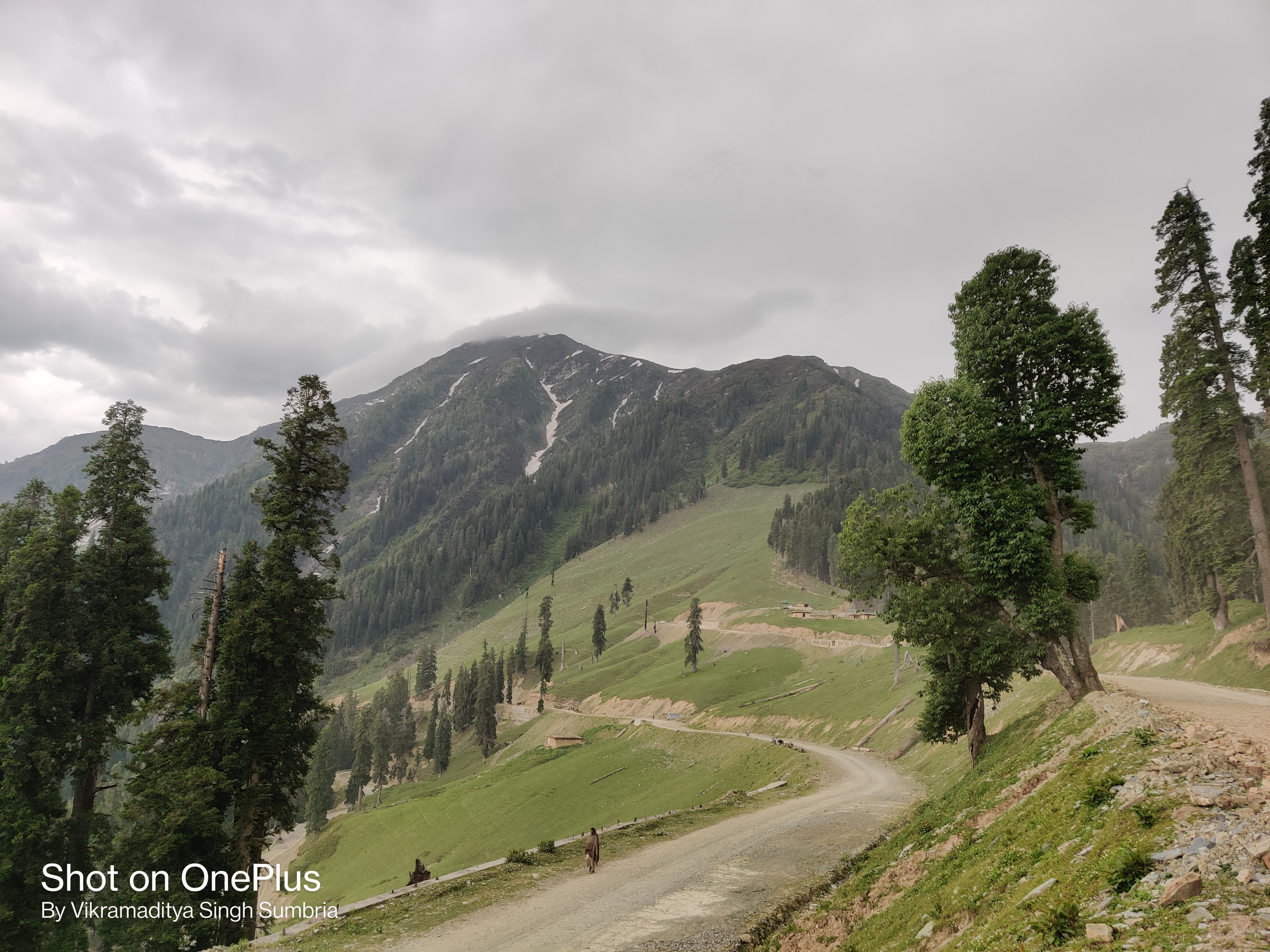
- Mt. Sonbain Ashapati, near Bhaderwah, District Doda, J&K, India.

Highest point
- Elevation: 3,983 m (13,068 ft)
- Coordinates: 32°51′45″N 75°41′54″E

Geography
- Location within Jammu and Kashmir Location within India
- Location: Doda district, Jammu and Kashmir, India
- Parent range: Middle Himalayas

Sonbain Ashapati (or simply Sonbain) is a mountain massif in the Middle Himalayas of Jammu and Kashmir, India, southeast of the town of Bhaderwah near the border with Himachal Pradesh. The Neeru river originates from the Ashapati glacier. The mountain massif lies on the inter-state border between Jammu and Kashmir and Himachal Pradesh, at the trisection of the Doda, Kathua and Chamba districts.

== Etymology ==
The Sonbain word is derived from two Bhaderwahi words, son meaning 'golden' and bain meaning 'spring'.

== Geography ==
On the Bhaderwah-Bani-Basholi road, Guldanda is a large ridge, from where the Sonbain Ashapati peak can be climbed. The Ashapati glacier, which gives birth to the Neeru river, is located to the left of this ridge.
