= Dhara, Jammu and Kashmir =

Village in Jammu and Kashmir

Dhara
- Village
- Country: India
- Union Territory: Jammu and Kashmir
- Division: Jammu
- Parliamentary Constituency: Udhampur
- District: Doda
- Tehsil: Doda

Population (2011)
  - Total: 3,441

Languages
  - Spoken: Sarazi, Kashmiri
- Time zone: UTC+5:30 (IST)
- Postal code: 182201

Dhara is a village located in the Doda Tehsil of the Doda district in the Indian administered Union Territory of Jammu and Kashmir.

== Demographics ==
According to the 2011 Census, Dhara had a total population of 3441 people, with1,785 males and 1,656 females. The village has a significant population of children aged 0-6, comprising 21.51% of the total population, with 740 children in this age group. The average sex ratio in Dhara is 928, which is higher than the state average of 889. The child sex ratio in Dhara stands at 968, also higher than the Jammu and Kashmir state average of 862.

== Education ==
Dhara village has a lower literacy rate compared to the overall literacy rate in the state of Jammu and Kashmir. In 2011, the literacy rate in Dhara was 58.68%, while the state average was 67.16%. Among the population, male literacy stood at 72.04%, while female literacy was 44.12%.
