= Kastigarh =

Village in Doda, Jammu & Kashmir, India

- Village/Tehsil
- Kastigarh
- Location in Jammu and Kashmir, India
- Coordinates: 33.156537°N 75.451721°E
- Country: India
- Union territory: Jammu and Kashmir
- Division: Jammu
- Region: Chenab Valley
- District: Doda

Population (2011)
  - Total: 32,000+

Language
  - Spoken: Kashmiri, Sarazi, Gojri
  - Official: Urdu
- Pin Code: 182147
- Tehsildar: Pushpak Saroop - JKAS
- BDC Chairperson: Ab Gani

Kastigarh (also spelt as Kashtigarh) is a village and tehsil in Doda district of the Jammu division of Jammu and Kashmir, India. In 2022, Kastigarh became the part of Doda West Assembly constituency.
