= Neeru River =

River tributary in Jammu and Kashmir

Neeru
- Location within Jammu and Kashmir Location within India

Location
- Country: India
- Flows through: Bhaderwah-Doda in Jammu and Kashmir

Physical characteristics
- Source: Sonbain Ashapati Glacier
  - location: Bhaderwah, Doda district, Jammu and Kashmir, India
  - coordinates: 32.879304°N 75.716198°E
- Mouth: Chenab river
  - location: Pul Doda, Doda district, Jammu and Kashmir
  - coordinates: 33°08′19″N 75°33′18″E
- Length: 50 km (31 mi) approx.
- Niru River in Jammu and Kashmir

Neeru river or Neru river is a tributary of the Chenab River, beginning at the Sonbain Ashapati Glacier in Bhaderwah and joining the Chenab at Pul Doda in the Doda district. The Gupt Ganga temple of Bhaderwah is located on the bank of this river.

== Origin ==
Neeru river originates from the Sonabain Glacier in Bhaderwah of Jammu and Kashmir.

== Geography ==
The Neeru river flows through Bhaderwah valley and joins river Chenab at Pul Doda.

=== Gupt Ganga temple ===
The historic Shiv temple, which is entirely composed of stone slabs, is located 0.5 km to the east of the town on the bank of the river Neeru. Long stone slabs were used in its construction, which is similar to that of a tomb. Here, Ganga abruptly collapses onto the Lingam before vanishing. There is a Bhimsen footprint on a rock inside the temple. During their Agyat-Vaas, the Pandavas are believed to have used a long cave to go from Bhadarwah to Kashmir. One of the well-known historical pilgrimage sites in Bhaderwah is Gupt Ganga. The water from the inside then flows to a "Bawali" (Pond) where visitors, devout individuals, and sadhus take a bath. The Bawali's water is cool in the summer and warm in the winter.
