= Sarazis =

Ethnic group in Jammu and Kashmir, India

The Sarazi people are an Indo-Aryan ethnolinguistic group inhabiting the Saraz region of the Jammu division in Jammu and Kashmir, India. Their primary language is Sarazi, classified as a member of the Western Pahari language family. While primarily Hindu, the Sarazi people also include a small minority of Muslim communities who speak Sarazi as a second language.

== History and Culture ==
The Sarazi people have a rich history and tradition deeply rooted in the mountainous terrain of the Saraz region. Their culture is influenced by both Hindu and Muslim practices, reflecting the region's diverse religious landscape. Traditional occupations include agriculture, animal husbandry, and craftsmanship. Music and dance play like Dakku dance a significant role in Sarazi cultural celebrations. Sarazis share a lot of cultural similarities with Bhaderwahis

== Language ==
The Sarazi language shares similarities with both Kashmiri and Western Pahari languages. Although historically considered a Kashmiri dialect, Sarazi is now recognized as distinct with its unique grammar and vocabulary. While primarily spoken, efforts are underway to promote literacy and documentation of the language.

== See also ==
- Bhadarwahis

== Sources ==
- Ashiqehind, Vikalp (2018). "Sarazi: Endangered Language of the Chenab Valley". Sahapedia.
- Bhat, Shabir Ahmad; Niaz, Sahar (2014). "Siraji". In Devy, G. N.; Koul, Omkar N. (eds.). The Languages of Jammu & Kashmir. People's linguistic survey of India. Vol. 12. New Delhi: Orient Blackswan. pp. 291–302. ISBN 978-81-250-5516-7.
- Grierson, George A. (1919). Linguistic Survey of India. Vol. VIII, Part 2, Indo-Aryan family. North-western group. Specimens of the Dardic or Piśācha languages (including Kāshmiri). Calcutta: Office of the Superintendent of Government Printing, India. pp. 432–57.
- Kaul, Pritam Krishen (2006). Pahāṛi and Other Tribal Dialects of Jammu. Vol. 1. Delhi: Eastern Book Linkers. ISBN 8178541017.
- Mahajan, Chakraverti (2018). "Saraz and Sarazi: Situating a Language and Linguistic Zone in Jammu and Kashmir". Sahapedia.
- Wali, Kashi; Koul, Omkar N. (1996). Kashmiri : a cognitive-descriptive grammar. New York: Routledge. ISBN 0-415-05868-6.
