= Mohalla, Jammu and Kashmir =

Village in Jammu and Kashmir

Mohalla
- Village/Tehsil
- Mohalla
- Location in Jammu and Kashmir, India
- Coordinates: 33.159549°N 75.718990°E
- Country: India
- Union Territory: Jammu & Kashmir
- Division: Jammu
- Region: Chenab Valley
- District: Doda

Population (2011)
  - Total: 8,556

Language
  - Spoken: Kashmiri, Sarazi, Gojri
  - Official: Urdu
- Pin Code: 182201
- Tehsildar: Majid Jahengir

Mohalla (also spelt as Mahalla) is a village and tehsil in the Doda district of Jammu and Kashmir, India. In 2022, Mohalla became the part of Doda Assembly constituency.

== History ==
Mahalla tehsil was created in 2014 along with 10 new tehsils for Doda district. It was one of the 659 new administrative units which includes 135 tehsils, 46 sub divisions, 177 CD blocks and 301 nayabats.
