= Chenab Valley =

- Region
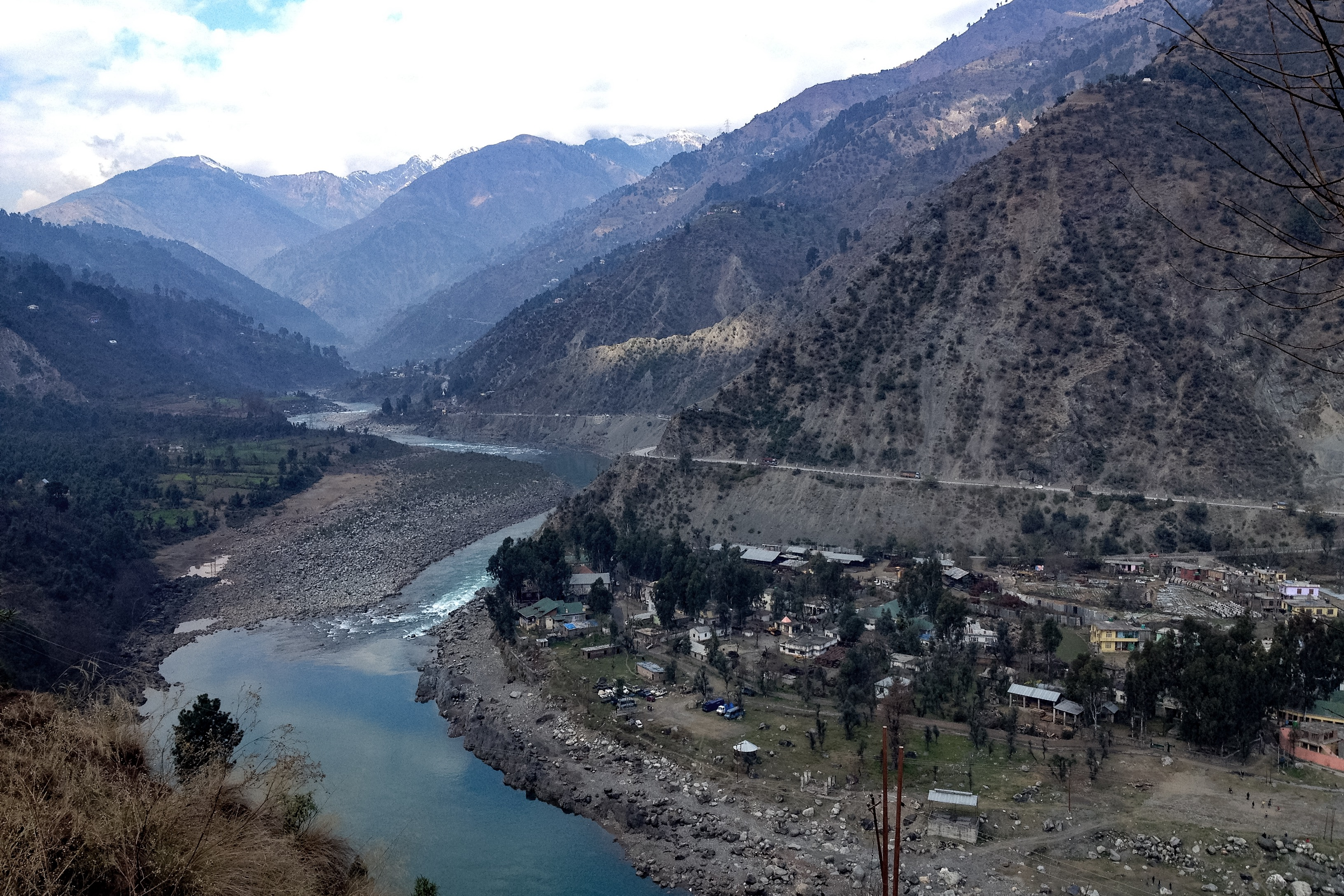
- Chenab River at Ramban

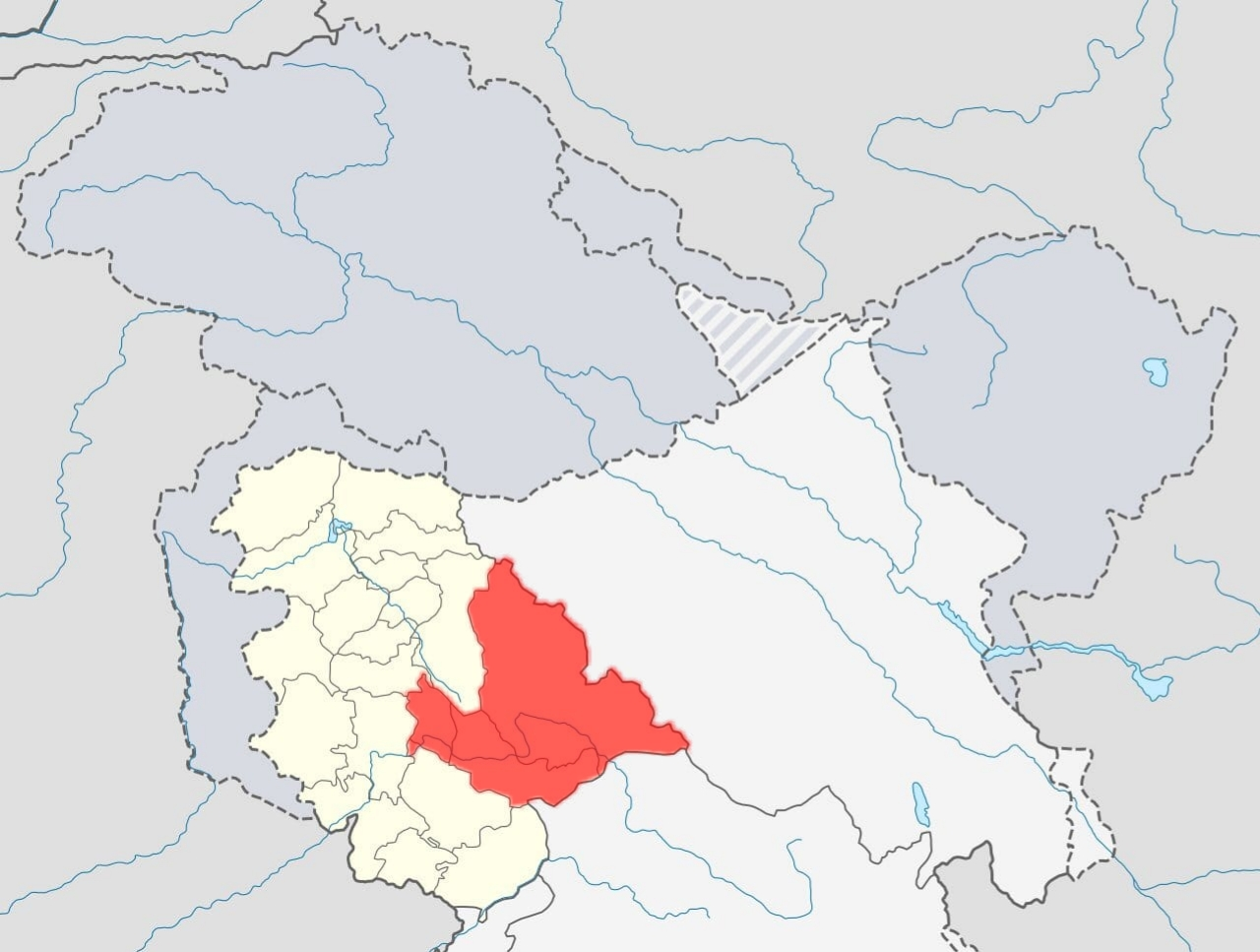
- Chenab valley in Jammu and Kashmir
- Coordinates: 33°17′8″N 75°56′12″E
- Country: India
- Union Territory: Jammu and Kashmir
- Division: Jammu

Area
  - Land: 17,978 km^{2} (6,941 sq mi)

Population (2011)
  - Total: 924,345
  - Density: 51.415/km^{2} (133.17/sq mi)

Languages
  - Official: Dogri, Kashmiri, Urdu, Hindi, English
  - Spoken: Kashmiri, Kishtwari, Pogali, Bhaderwahi, Sarazi, Gojri, Padari
- Districts: Doda; Kishtwar; Ramban
- Demonym: Chenabi
- Vehicle Registration Numbers: JK06 (Doda); JK17 (Kishtwar); JK19 (Ramban)
- Police Zone: Doda-Kishtwar-Ramban (DKR Range)
- Lok Sabha constituency: Udhampur Lok Sabha constituency
- Forest Zone: Chenab Circle

The Chenab Valley, also known as the Chenab Region, is the river valley of the Chenab River flowing through the Kishtwar, Doda, and Ramban districts in the Jammu division of the Indian union territory of Jammu and Kashmir.

== Etymology ==
The term Chenab Valley derives from the Chenab River. The term is sometimes used to refer to the mountainous regions of north-eastern Jammu division, including the districts of Doda, Ramban, Kishtwar, and some parts of Reasi, Udhampur, and Kathua.

Chenab valley was used by Erik Norin in a 1926 journal article titled The Relief Chronology of Chenab Valley. The term was later popularised by various social activists and politicians referring to the erstwhile Doda district formed in 1948.

== Geography ==
The Chenab Valley lies between the middle and outer Himalayan range in the Jammu division of Jammu and Kashmir, India. It is divided into three districts: Doda, Ramban, and Kishtwar. The valley touches the Anantnag district of south Kashmir to the north; the state of Himachal Pradesh and the Kathua district of J&K to the south; the Udhampur district of J&K to the southwest, and Reasi district of J&K to the west; with Doda in its middle. It consists of eight assembly seats.

Chenab Valley has mostly hilly terrain. The Chenab River flows through all the districts of Chenab Valley including Doda district, Kishtwar District, and Ramban District. The area is an active seismic zone.

== History ==
The demography of Chenab valley which is referred to erstwhile Doda district is complex as compared to its neighbouring districts primarily because of the wide diversity in its population. In the past, Doda was largely inhabited by Sarazi population before people started settling here from Kashmir and other adjoining areas. The reasons for kashmiri population settling here in the past in 17th and 18th century is matter of ambiguity between historians. However, Sumantra Bose says it was repression by feudal class that drew people to the district of Doda, Ramban and Kishtwar.

== Demographics ==
Religions in Chenab Valley (2011)
1. Islam (59.9%)
2. Hinduism (39.2%)
3. Buddhism (0.22%)
4. Others (0.68%)

Chenab Valley is home to a variety of ethnic groups. Among the languages spoken in the region, Kashmiri and its sister Dardic languages Kishtwari and Pogali – are the most widely spoken. Other languages include Gojri, and the Western Pahari languages Sarazi, Bhadarwahi, Padari.

Languages of Chenab Valley (2011)
1. Kashmiri (41.7%)
2. Gujari (10.9%)
3. Bhaderwahi (9.89%)
4. Sarazi (8.27%)
5. Pogali (5.27%)
6. Dogri (5.03%)
7. Kishtwari (4.18%)
8. Pahadi (4.02%)
9. Hindi (3.02%)
10. Padari (1.85%)
11. Nepali (1.12%)
12. Gaddi (0.64%)
13. Bhotia (0.25%)
14. Others (3.85%)

== Tourist destinations ==
Chenab valley is also the hub of hilly tourist attractions after Kashmir, including:

- Bhaderwah Valley, in Doda district, a famous tourist destination of Chenab Valley
- Hansrajtop, in Pogal Paristhan, Jammu and Kashmir
- Jai Valley, in Bhaderwah, Jammu and Kashmir
- Chinta Valley, also in Bhaderwah, Jammu and Kashmir
- Jantroon Dhar, the large meadows in Thathri subdivision of Doda district
- Padri Top, the group of meadows in Bhaderwah
- Bimal Nag, a meadow in Drabshalla tehsil (subdistrict) of Kishtwar district
- Mughal Maidan, a tourist destination in Kishtwar district
- Chatroo, famous for its small lake, a tourist destination in Kishtwar district
- Sinthan Pass, in the higher reaches of Kishtwar district on Kishtwar-Anantnag Road
- Bhal Padri, a beautiful meadow in Gandoh (Bhalessa)
- Lal Draman, a scenic tourist destination in Doda district
- Dessa Valley, in Doda district
- Sanasar, in Ramban district
- Dagantop, in Gool area of Ramban district

== Natural disasters ==
=== 2013 Doda earthquake ===
A 5.8 earthquake hit the Doda district on 1 May 2013, killing two and injuring 69. Seismic activity continued in the valley throughout 2013, prompting teams of seismologists to study the area. A local belief states that the earthquakes were being caused by hydroelectric construction projects in the area.

=== 2017 Thathri flash floods ===
Flash floods wreaked havoc in Thathri town of Doda district of J&K, inundating vast areas along the Batote- Kishtwar National Highway and washing away half a dozen houses. Six persons were killed in the flash floods.

=== 2021 Hunzar Kishtwar cloudburst ===
A cloudburst hit Hunzar hamlet in Dachhan area of Kishtwar district, resulting in the death of 26 persons and 17 injured on 28 July 2021. As per reports, only 7 dead bodies were recovered while 19 dead bodies were not found.

=== 2023 Doda earthquake ===
On 13 June 2023, a 5.4-magnitude earthquake occurred in the Doda district, followed by tremors across North India and Pakistan. The earthquake caused injuries to five people.

=== 2025 Chositi Kishtwar cloudburst ===
On 14 August 2025, more than 50 people died and dozens were injured in flash floods in Chositi village of Kishtwar District due to a cloudburst.

== History ==
The various areas referred to as "Chenab Valley" used to be part of the principalities of Bhaderwah, Kishtwar, Chamba, and other smaller principalities which were annexed by the Dogras of Jammu, who made them part of the Dogra princely state of Jammu and Kashmir established following the Treaty of Amritsar (1846). During Dogra rule, most of these areas were part of the Udhampur district. In 1948, the Udhampur district was divided into two by the government of Sheikh Abdullah. The move was criticised by the Jammu-based Praja Parishad, a Hindu nationalist political party, as an attempt to Islamise the state's administration.

In the past, the area around Doda was largely inhabited by Sarazi population before people started settling here from the Kashmir valley and other adjoining areas. The reasons for this migration in the 17th and 18th centuries are a matter of ambiguity among historians. Sumantra Bose says that repression by the feudal class in the Kashmir valley drew people to these areas.

The early history of Chenab Valley is not well documented, with few chronicles available about the rulers of Kishtwar and Bhaderwah. The settlement reports indicate that the area was ruled by various groups including Ranas, Rajas, and independent chiefs from time to time, including the Jaral Ramas, Katoch rajas, Bhaus Manhases, Chibs, Thakkars, Wanis, and Gakkars. In 1822 AD, Doda was conquered by Maharaja Gulab Singh and became the winter capital of the Kishtwar state.

English traveller G. T. Vigne visited Doda in 1829 and described his journey through the region. He mentions traveling through a deep and rocky nullah which joins the Chenab River, (Note: The Nullah traversed by Vigne is most likely the Neeru river, which joins the Chenab at Pul Doda.) and then crossing the river over a dangerous bridge in the Himalayas. Vigne writes about the bridge in Doda, a strong rope stretched from one bank to the other, tied to rocks. A wooden structure was placed over the rope and additional ropes were tied to it, allowing the structure to move back and forth. He also encountered another type of bridge, which was crossed on foot, made of small ropes bound with pieces of bark and woven into a thick rope. Hanging ropes were provided for support.

In 1948, the erstwhile Udhampur district was partitioned into the present Udhampur district, containing the Udhampur and Ramanagar tehsils, and Doda district containing the Ramban, Bhadarwah, Doda, Thathri and Kishtwar tehsils.

From 1975 to 1976, the Government of India conducted the Preinvestment Survey of Forest Resources specifically in the Chenab Valley by Department of Agriculture. During this period, a detailed survey of forests in the Chenab Catchment area was done in Doda, Bhaderwah, Kishtwar, and Ramban divisions of the forest. The area is an active seismic zone.

In 1990s, various incidents were reported about the suppression of Hindus by the Militant organizations. In response to the rising terrorism, the government authorities made Village Defense Committee (VDC) in various villages. However, incidents of VDC members indulging in criminal activities have also been reported in the past. In a village called Karada, four Muslims were allegedly killed by VDC members. This incident also triggered the terrorist organisations to target those who supported the VDCs, believing them to be anti-Muslim. Since the 1990s, many such incidents of killings by terrorists and VDCs have been reported.

In 2006, Ramban was made into an independent district and the hilly area to the east of the present Doda district was separated as the Kishtwar district. The remaining areas include the Doda tehsil carved out of Kishtwar and the original Bhadarwah, now divided into three tehsils.

== Demands for divisional status ==
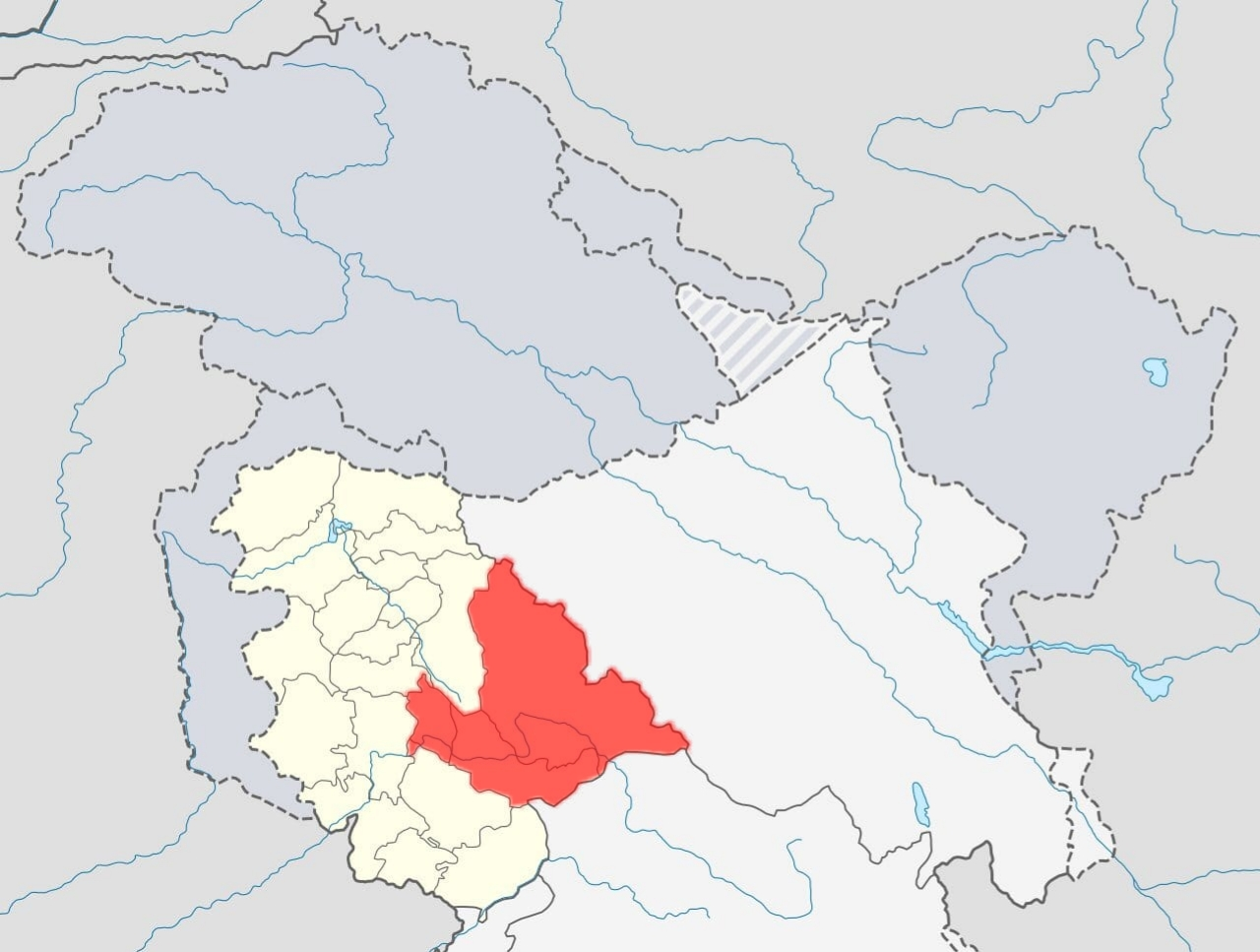
Location of the districts for which separate divisional status is sought within Jammu and Kashmir

There has been a movement demanding separate administrative division for the Chenab valley by various social and political activists for long time. In 2014, a major protest was called in Doda for the demand of separate administrative division. The demand rose again in 2018 and 2019 when Ladakh got divisional status and the former chief minister of Jammu and Kashmir, Omar Abdullah added "Two Separate Divisional Status for Chenab Valley and Pir Panjal Region" to his party's political agenda. The districts of the proposed Chenab Valley consists of six Assembly seats.

The Hindu nationalist Bharatiya Janata Party maintains that "there is no Chenab valley and it is only the Jammu division for representation of the region", while the Jammu & Kashmir National Conference says that the demand is based on developmental negligence and wants separate divisions from Jammu division for Chenab valley and Pir Panjal.

The areas of the three districts are termed as the DKR Range (Doda-Kishtwar-Ramban Range) by police and military officials, while a separate Deputy Inspector General is posted for this range by Jammu and Kashmir Police.

=== Hill Development Council ===
In 1996, chief minister Farooq Abdullah promised administrative autonomy to Chenab. Later in 2000, a bill demanding a Hill Development Council for Chenab valley was presented in the legislative assembly by the Sheikh Abdul Rehman (then MLA from Bhaderwah).

In July 2015, then chief minister of Jammu and Kashmir Mufti Mohammad Sayed, ruled out the demand of Chenab Valley Hill Council and announced Chenab Valley Development Fund (CVDF) for the development and upliftment of mountainous and remote districts of Doda, Kishtwar and Ramban.

== See also ==
- Panun Kashmir
- Duggar (region)
- Pir Panjal (region)
