= Chilly Pingal =

Village in Jammu and Kashmir, India

- Village/Tehsil
- Chilly Pingal in Jammu and Kashmir, India
- Coordinates: 33.044370°N 75.974427°E
- Country: India
- Union Territory: Jammu and Kashmir
- District: Doda
- Demonym(s): Kashmiri, Bhalessi, Bhaderwahi, Sarazi, Gojri.

Languages
  - Spoken: Kashmiri, Gojari, Bhadarwahi, Urdu
- Time zone: UTC+5:30 (IST)
- PIN: 182203

Chilly Pingal or Chilly Pingle (also Chilli Pingal) (Note: Chilli Pingal is the official name of this tehsil and village in Gandoh sub-district of Doda district However, Chilly Pingal is the commonly used name.) is a tehsil of Doda district in the union territory of Jammu and Kashmir. The Headquarter of the Tehsil is Located at Tandla village.
