= Shakti Raj Parihar =

Indian politician

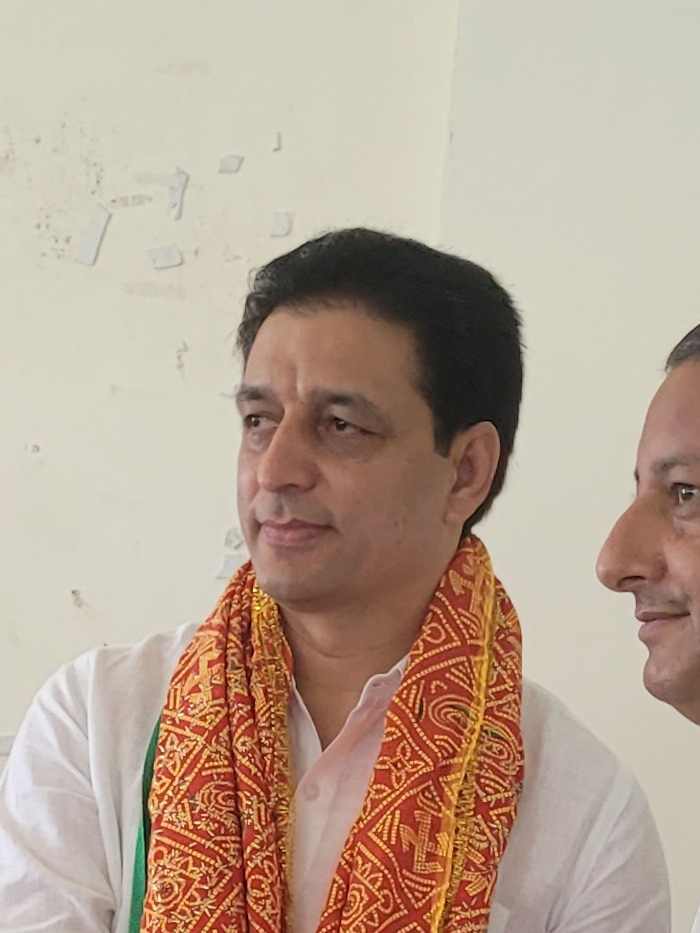
- Shakti Raj Parihar

Minister of State (MoS) of Jammu and Kashmir
- In office 30 April 2018 – 19 June 2018
- Governor: Narinder Nath Vohra
- Chief Minister: Mehbooba Mufti

Member of Jammu and Kashmir Legislative Assembly
- Incumbent
- Assumed office 8 October 2024
- Preceded by: Constituency established
- Constituency: Doda West
- In office 23 December 2014 – 21 November 2018
- Governor: Narinder Nath Vohra
- Chief Minister: Mehbooba Mufti
- Preceded by: Abdul Majid Wani
- Succeeded by: Mehraj Malik
- Constituency: Doda

Personal details
- Born: 18 January 1970 (age 56) Village Salana, Tehsil Drabshala Erstwhile Doda District, Jammu and Kashmir, India.
- Party: Bharatiya Janata Party
- Profession: Businessperson, Politician

Shakti Raj Parihar is an Indian politician and member of the Bharatiya Janata Party. Parihar is a member of the Jammu and Kashmir Legislative Assembly from the Doda West Vidhan Sabha in Doda district and a former Minister of State (MoS) in the BJP-PDP Government.

After passing higher secondary, Shakti Parihar worked in a French Multinational Company. Later he started his own business. He joined Bharatiya Janata Party in 2008 and contested Assembly Election unsuccessfully from Inderwal Vidhan Sabha. In 2014, Parihar surprised political circles after getting elected from Muslim majority Doda by a margin of 4,040 votes. He defeated the sitting MLA of Congress, Abdul Majid Wani who secured 20,532 votes. And the candidate of Omar Abdullah led Jammu & Kashmir National Conference got 16,416 votes and stood at third place.

On 30 April 2018, Shakti Parihar was inducted as MoS in the BJP-PDP Govt.

On 13 January 2020, Parihar was elected as the member of BJP National Council from Jammu and Kashmir. He represented Udhampur Lok Sabha in the Council.

On 22 July 2023, Parihar met Minister of Defence, Rajnath Singh. He took up the issues of defence roads in Doda and special recruitment rally of Indian Army in erstwhile Doda District. Defence Minister assured Raj to help in every possible manner. In 2024, he won from the newly created Doda West Assembly constituency, defeating his closest rival and Congress candidate Pardeep Kumar by a margin of 3,453 votes.
