= Padri Pass =

Tourist destination in Jammu and Kashmir

Padri Top
- Padri Pass
- Location within Jammu and Kashmir Location within India
- Floor elevation: 3,037 m (9,964 ft)

Geography
- Country: India
- State: Jammu and Kashmir
- Region: Jammu region
- District: Doda district
- Coordinates: 32.9110087°N 75.8005142°E
- Interactive map of Padri Top

Padri Top or Padri Pass is a hill station situated 41 kilometres (25 mi) North of Bhaderwah on [interstate link] Bhaderwah–Chamba National Highway. It has 99.7 kilometres (62.0 mi) long meadows and used for adventure sports like snow-skiing in winters and Paragliding in summers. It is the highest Pass on Bhaderwah-Chamba National Highway located between the borders of Jammu and Kashmir and Himachal Pradesh.

== Route ==
The route starts from provincial headquarter and nearest airport at Jammu. The road starts from Jammu to Batote (via NH1A), changing route from Batote — Pul Doda (via NH244), turning left near Neeru Bridge towards Doda —Bhaderwah road.
