= Badroon =

Village in Jammu and Kashmir, India

Badroon is a village in the Doda district of the Jammu and Kashmir union territory of India.
