= Pul Doda =

Small township in Jammu and Kashmir

- Township
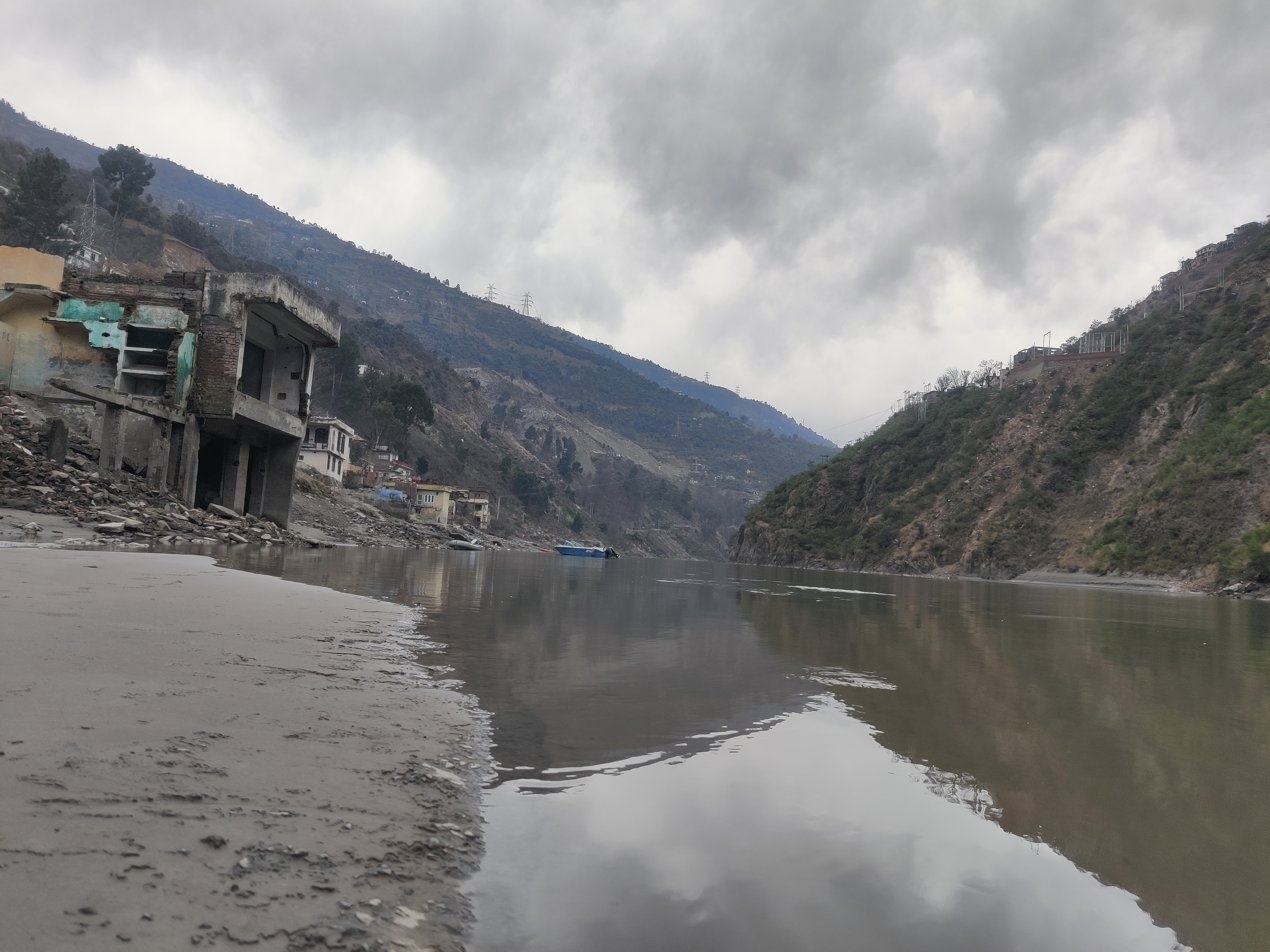
- Pul Doda on the bank of river Chenab

- Location in Jammu and Kashmir, India
- Coordinates: 33°08′12″N 75°33′06″E
- Country: India
- Union territory: Jammu and Kashmir
- Division: Jammu region
- Region: Chenab valley
- District: Doda
- Demonym(s): Bhaderwahi and Kashmiri

Language
  - Spoken: Kashmiri, Bhaderwahi, Sarazi
  - Official: Urdu
- Time zone: UTC+5:30 (IST)
- Postal code: 182204

Pul Doda is a small township located in Doda district of Jammu and Kashmir. It was once a bustling town until 2008, when it was submerged in the river Chenab due to the rise in water levels caused by the Baglihar Dam.

== Etymology ==
The name "Pul Doda" is derived from the bridges that were built in the area.

== History ==
The first bridge constructed here was the only way to cross the Chenab river and reach Doda city. In 1957, a suspension motorable bridge was built in Pul Doda after a lorry bridge was damaged. This bridge remained the only one connecting the NH1B (now NH244) with the city of Doda. Over the years, several more bridges were built in Pul Doda, including a concrete bridge in 1997 and the Ganpat Bridge in 2008, which is considered the highest road bridge in India. Despite the construction of several bridges, only a few remain today. The bridges in Pul Doda hold historical significance, as they were built during the time when Jammu and Kashmir was a princely state. They continue to serve as important infrastructure for the local community, providing a crucial connection between different parts of the region.
