= Marmat (tehsil) =

Tehsil in Jammu and Kashmir, India

- Tehsil
- Location within Jammu and Kashmir Location within India
- Coordinates: 33°05′N 75°24′E
- Country: India
- Union territory: Jammu and Kashmir
- District: Doda
- Villages: Sarak; Mothi-B; Hambal-A; Sarsi; Roat-A; Bari; Paryote-A; Malhori; Mothi; Goha; Behota Lota; Behota Lower; Hambal-B; Khellani; Mangota-A; Mangota-B; Paryote-B; Prabal; Roat-B; Sars; Sewat; Upper Behota

Area
  - Total: 222.588 km^{2} (85.942 sq mi)

Population (2011)
  - Total: 28,501
  - Male: 14,632
  - Female: 13,869
- Demonym(s): Bhaderwahi, Kashmiri, Khash, Rudhari

Languages
  - Spoken: Bhadarwahi, Kashmiri, Urdu, khashali
- Time zone: UTC+5:30 (IST)
- PIN: 182201
- Tehsildar: Fareed Ahmed
- DDC Member: Mushtaq Ahmed (Indian National Congress)

Marmat is a tehsil in the Doda district of Jammu and Kashmir, India. Marmat consists of 18 villages, including the village of Marmat. It is 45 kilometres south of the district headquarters of Doda.

Kalhota

== cs ==
According to the census of 2011, Marmat has a population of 28,501 (14,632 males and 13,869 females). The sex ratio is 992 females per 1,000 males. The sex ratio among scheduled tribes exceeds the rural district-wide sex ratio of 929 females per 1,000 males by as many as four blocks.

== Local wildlife ==
=== Himalayan Black Bear (Selenarctos thibetanus) ===
While the Himalayan Black Bear was quite common in Marmat, its population has experienced a sharp decline due to poaching. These bears are now found in the interiors of the steep forest areas of the Marmat ranges, though few are believed to remain alive.

=== Common Langur (Presbytis entellus) ===
Locally known as langur, these animals are frequently found in the forests of Marmat. They inhabit altitudes up to 3,500 meters above mean sea level. In general, they are more arboreal in habitat than macaques. They occasionally pillage gardens and cultivated areas. Langurs live in reasonably large groups of all ages and both sexes.

==== Koklass Pheasant (Ceriornis macrolophus) ====
The Koklass Pheasant is a species of bird that can be found in Doda, between the Batote and Marmat ranges.

== Villages in Marmat ==
- GOHA
- PRABAL
- BARI
- Hambal
- Mangota
- Mothi
- Behota
- Roat
- Sarak
- Saras
- Sarsi
- Seote

== Disasters and tragedies ==
On 12 November 2019, at least 16 people killed in a road accident near Khellani village of Marmat tehsil.
