= Bhagwa, Jammu and Kashmir =

Bhagwah Bhagwah
- Village
- Bhagwah
- Location in Jammu and Kashmir, India Bhagwah (India)
- Coordinates: 33.21°N 75.40°E
- Country: India
- Union Territory: Jammu and Kashmir
- Division: Jammu
- Region: Chenab Valley
- District: Doda

Population (2011)
  - Total: 5,907

Languages
  - Spoken: Hindi, Kashmiri, Urdu
- Time zone: UTC+5:30 (IST)
- PIN: 182202
- Vehicle registration: JK-06
- Website: doda.nic.in

Bhagwah is a Tehsil in Doda district of the Indian union territory of Jammu and Kashmir. The town is located 14 kilometres from the district headquarters Doda.

== Demographics ==
According to the 2011 census of India, Bhagwah has 1088 households. The literacy rate of Bhagwa village was 52.46% compared to 67.16% of Jammu and Kashmir. In Bhagwah, Male literacy stands at 67.16% while the female literacy rate was 37.87%.

Demographics (2011 Census)
	Total	Male	Female
Population	5907	2950	2957
Children aged below 6 years	1267	639	628
Scheduled caste	240	118	122
Scheduled tribe	130	61	69
Literacy	52.46%	67.16%	37.87%
Workers (all)	2423	1363	1060
Main workers (total)	785	–	–
Marginal workers (total)	1638	667	971

== Transportation ==
=== Road ===
Bhagwa is 14 km away from the district headquarters Doda. Doda is connected by the NH 244.

=== Rail ===
The nearest major railway station is Udhampur railway station located 140 kilometres from Bhagwa.

=== Air ===
The nearest airport Is Jammu Airport located 200 kilometres from Bhagwa.

== See also ==
- Jammu and Kashmir
- Doda district
- Doda
