= Sahapedia =

Indian encyclopedia

- Website type: Non Profit
- Available in: English
- Owner: Sahapedia.org
- Managing director: Dr. Sudha Gopalakrishnan
- Revenue: Non Profit
- Website: www.sahapedia.org
- Commercial: "No"
- Current status: Active
- Content license: CC-BY-NC-SA 4.0 Licence
- Written in: php

Sahapedia is a website which seeks to make the culture and history of India accessible to all. Sahapedia is a portmanteau of the word Saha and encyclopedia. Saha is Sanskrit for "together with". It uses a method of collaboration between scholars and lay people contributing content to the portal. Once lay people register they are able to contribute to the portal once approved by editors. The site seeks to take the middle path between scholarly contribution and the open contribution system seen on Wikipedia. It serves as a portal with content in the form of articles, videos, image galleries, interviews and events listing.

== History ==
Sahapedia was founded in New Delhi in 2010. It was registered as a not-for-profit Society in June 2011 under the Societies Act of 1860 and has offices in New Delhi and Kochi. S. Ramadorai, who was the Former Vice Chairman, Tata Consultancy Services, and Chairman, National Skills Development Agency is the President and mentor of Sahapedia. Sudha Gopalakrishnan, who was the Founder Director of the National Mission for Manuscripts, Government of India and an UNESCO-empanelled expert on intangible cultural heritage is the Vice President and Executive Director of Sahapedia. Sahapedia's technology platform, which was launched on 23 April 2016.

In 2018, Sahapedia won PATA Gold Award for its India Heritage Walk Festival. In 2019, Sahapedia won Pacific Asia Travel Association Grand Award.

== Work ==
The core of Sahapedia is the encyclopedia that addresses ten domains: the areas covered come under the categories of Knowledge Traditions, Visual and Material Arts, Performing Arts, Literature and Languages, Practices and Rituals, Histories, Institutions, People, and Natural Environment. The research and editorial team identify subjects for the encyclopedia, visit libraries and consult experts to arrive at an outline for its treatment, write to scholars for articles or request them for interviews, go on field visits for documentation and compile links to online resources and suggestions for further reading. Sahapedia also works with affiliates who are experts in their field and can curate modules that cover various aspects of a particular subject.

== Ongoing projects ==
- Oral history: Documents interactions with artists, scholars and practitioners. The project also records performances, events, activities, lectures, demonstrations and seminars.
- Library: Makes available archival material relating to history, literature, music and the performing arts under the Creative Share-alike License.
- Built heritage: Documents heritage sites and spaces in India with a view to covering both academic studies and experiential accounts. India Heritage Walks seeks to enable access to local history and heritage.
- Maps project: Encourages people to participate in the cultural mapping of India and South Asia by marking cultural sites, forms, practices and events in their areas.
- Heritage education: It has partnered in the Heritage Education efforts of the Central Board of Secondary Education involving 12,900 schools, by creating an interactive web resource for children on the CBSE website Besides, the collaboratively-created encyclopedia database will be available as an offline tool for distance and rural education.
- Institutional collaborations: Sahapedia is in partnership with the Indian Ministry of Culture, Rashtrapati Bhavan, Archaeological Survey of India, the Indian Institute of Advanced Studies, National School of Drama, the National Centre for the Performing Arts and the International Information Networking Centre for Intangible Cultural Heritage in the Asia-Pacific Region, UNESCO.
- India Heritage Walks: An initiative that hosts immersive and diverse experiences that bring people closer to their local heritage and culture.
- Museums of India: Designed to bring together museums, heritage and communities to create a participatory eco-system of museum exploration, enrichment and education. It is an expanding digital listing of the museums in India, with the realization that there is no single in-depth online resource that showcases the diversity of Indian museums.

== Recognition ==
- India Heritage Walks won the Pacific Asia Travel Association (PATA) Grand Award 2019.
