= Sarazi language =

Language spoken in the Saraz region of Jammu, India

Sarazi
- سرازی; सराज़ी
- Native to: Jammu & Kashmir, India
- Region: Saraz
- Ethnicity: Sarazis
- Language family: Indo-European: Indo-Iranian; Indo-Aryan; Northern or Northwestern ?; Western Pahari or Lahnda ?; Sarazi

Language codes
- ISO 639-3: None (mis)
- Glottolog: sira1264

Sarazi or Sirazi (also spelled Siraji) is an Indo-Aryan language spoken in the Saraz region of the Jammu division of Jammu and Kashmir, India. It is native to the Saraz region, a hilly area taking up the northern half of Doda district and parts of neighbouring Ramban and Kishtwar districts. Sarazi is spoken as a first language by 46,000 people (as of 2001), primarily Hindus, but it is also used as a lingua franca of the Saraz region and so is also spoken as a second language by Muslims, who are native speakers of Kashmiri.

Sarazi has similarities to the neighbouring Western Pahari languages like Bhaderwahi, though it is nowadays most often classified with the latter. Various local names for the language, which may represent distinct dialects, include Bhagwali, Deswali, and Korarwali. Sarazi is not often used in writing, but when written, the default choice for a script falls on Perso-Arabic. The Latin script is also common, whereas Devanagari and the historical Takri script are encountered occasionally.

== Phonology ==
=== Consonants ===
Sarazi Consonants
		Labial	Dental	Retroflex	Palatal	Velar	Glottal
Nasal		m	n̪	ɳ	ɲ	ŋ	
Stop	voiceless	p	t̪	ʈ		k	ʔ
Stop	voiced	b	d̪	ɖ		ɡ	
Affricate	voiceless		t̪͡s̪	ʈ͡ʂ	t͡ɕ		
Affricate	voiced		d̪͡z̪	ɖ͡ʐ	d͡ʑ		
Fricative	voiceless		s̪	ʂ	ɕ		h
Fricative	voiced		z̪	ʐ	ʑ		ɦ
Approximant			l̪		j		

=== Vowels ===
Sarazi Vowels
	Front	Back
Close	i	u
Close-mid	e	o
Open-mid	ɛ	ɔ
Open	a	ɒ

== Classification ==
In the early 20th century, G.A. Grierson observed the similarities with both Kashmiri and with Western Pahari languages, and while noting that Sarazi can almost equally well be classified with either of the two, nonetheless opted to treat it as a dialect of Kashmiri on the basis of shared features in the verbal paradigm and elsewhere.

Although Sarazi is still sometimes perceived as a Kashmiri dialect, recent studies have generally placed it as a member of the Western Pahari group. This further corresponds with the speakers' own perceptions, who do not see their language as related to Kashmiri, and who consider themselves Pahari rather than Kashmiri.

An alternative proposal has seen the language as intermediate between the two groups but independent of either. It has also been conjectured that the language could have originally arisen as a creole.

== Notable events ==
Indian Prime Minister Narendra Modi on his visit to Saraz region also conversed in Sarazi with regional population. His words were "ku haal cho?" which translates to "how are you?" in English.

A daily news headlines program is broadcast by a news outlet The Chenab Times in the Sarazi and Bhadarwahi languages to promote them.

== See also ==
- Farid Ahmed Naik, first Sarazi language news reporter

== Bibliography ==
- Ashiqehind, Vikalp (2018). "Sarazi: Endangered Language of the Chenab Valley". Sahapedia.
- Bhat, Shabir Ahmad; Niaz, Sahar (2014). "Siraji". In Devy, G. N.; Koul, Omkar N. (eds.). The Languages of Jammu & Kashmir. People's linguistic survey of India. Vol. 12. New Delhi: Orient Blackswan. pp. 291–302. ISBN 978-81-250-5516-7.
- Grierson, George A. (1919). Linguistic Survey of India. Vol. VIII, Part 2, Indo-Aryan family. North-western group. Specimens of the Dardic or Piśācha languages (including Kāshmiri). Calcutta: Office of the Superintendent of Government Printing, India. pp. 432–57.
- Kaul, Pritam Krishen (2006). Pahāṛi and Other Tribal Dialects of Jammu. Vol. 1. Delhi: Eastern Book Linkers. ISBN 8178541017.
- Koul, Omkar N.; Schmidt, Ruth Laila (1983). Kashmiri : a sociolinguistic survey. Patiala: Indian Institute of Language Studies.
- Mahajan, Chakraverti (2018). "Saraz and Sarazi: Situating a Language and Linguistic Zone in Jammu and Kashmir". Sahapedia.
- Parihar, Ravi; Dwivedi, Amitabh Vikram (2019). A grammar of Sarazi. Languages of the world. Materials. Muenchen: Lincom GmbH. ISBN 978-3-86288-982-2.
- Varma, Siddeshwar (1939). "Indian Dialects in Phonetic Transcription. I: Dardo-Pahāṛi". Indian Linguistics. 7 (2): 88–97.
- Wali, Kashi; Koul, Omkar N. (1996). Kashmiri : a cognitive-descriptive grammar. New York: Routledge. ISBN 0-415-05868-6.
