= Doda, Jammu and Kashmir =

Town and district headquarters in Jammu and Kashmir, India

Doda
- Town
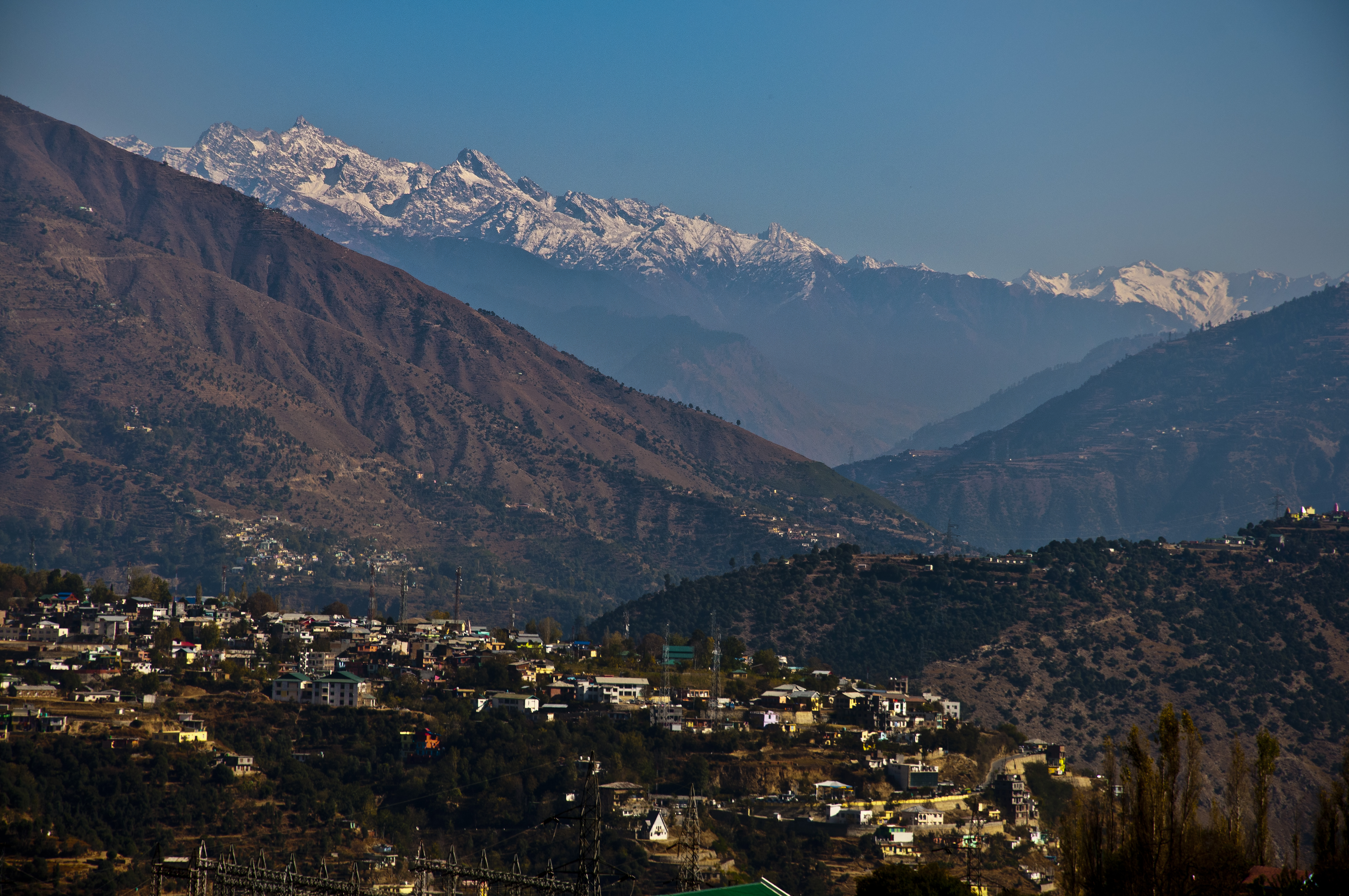
- View of Doda city

- Location in Jammu and Kashmir, India Doda (India)
- Coordinates: 33.13°N 75.57°E
- Country: India
- Union Territory: Jammu and Kashmir
- Division: Jammu
- Parliamentary Constituency: Udhampur
- District: Doda

Area
  - Total: 14.25 km^{2} (5.50 sq mi)
- Elevation: 1,107 m (3,632 ft)

Population (2011)
  - Total: 21,605
  - Density: 1,516/km^{2} (3,927/sq mi)

Demographics
  - Literacy: 85.1%
  - Sex ratio: 727.57 ♀/ 1000 ♂
- Time zone: UTC+5:30 (IST)
- PIN: 182202
- Vehicle registration: Plate No. - JK06

Doda is a town and a notified area committee in Doda district in the Indian union territory of Jammu and Kashmir. Doda has an average elevation of 1,107 metres (3,632 ft).

== Climate ==
The climate of the area is not uniform due to wide variations in altitude from place to place. The area, in general, enjoys temperate to sub-tropical type of climate. The climate of the district is almost dry. The rainfall is scanty. The temperature of the district varies from place to place. Ramban and Doda tehsils are fairly warmer while the regions like Dessa Valley tehsil Bhagwah, Gundna, Padder, Marwah and Warwan remain snow bound for five-six months of the year. Summer is generally without rain and precipitation. Almost all the regions experiences snowfall in the winter. The precipitation occurs either in the form of snowfall in higher regions and as rainfall in the lower regions. Monsoons prevail from July to September. Rainfall in the Doda district is heavy during July and September. The average annual rainfall is 926 mm and snowfall of about 135 mm.

Climate data for Doda, Jammu and Kashmir, India
Month	Jan	Feb	Mar	Apr	May	Jun	Jul	Aug	Sep	Oct	Nov	Dec	Year
Mean daily maximum °C (°F)	7.6 (45.7)	10.7 (51.3)	16.1 (61.0)	21.4 (70.5)	25.5 (77.9)	29.3 (84.7)	30.4 (86.7)	29.8 (85.6)	27.8 (82.0)	22.9 (73.2)	16.3 (61.3)	9.9 (49.8)	20.6 (69.1)
Mean daily minimum °C (°F)	−1.9 (28.6)	0.7 (33.3)	4.1 (39.4)	7.8 (46.0)	11.1 (52.0)	15.2 (59.4)	18.5 (65.3)	17.6 (63.7)	12.9 (55.2)	6.1 (43.0)	1 (34)	−1.3 (29.7)	7.7 (45.8)
Average precipitation mm (inches)	11.8 (0.46)	28.5 (1.12)	39.6 (1.56)	23.3 (0.92)	21 (0.8)	27.3 (1.07)	29.3 (1.15)	29.8 (1.17)	2.5 (0.10)	10.7 (0.42)	9.4 (0.37)	13.4 (0.53)	246.6 (9.67)
Source 1: World Weather Online
Source 2: Meoweather

== Demographics ==
Religion in Doda Town (2011)
1. Islam (66.5%)
2. Hinduism (32.6%)
3. Sikhism (0.64%)
4. Christianity (0.12%)
5. Jainism (0.06%)
6. 0.00%

As of 2011 India census, Doda had a population of 21,605. There were 12,506 males (58%) and 9,099 females (42%). Of the population, 2,726 (12.6%) were age 0-6: 1,487 males (55%) and 1,239 females (45%). The literacy rate for the people over six was 85.1% (males 92.1%, females 75.2%).

=== Religion ===
Islam has been dominant religion in the town with over 66.45% adherents, while Hinduism is followed by 32.62% of the people. Christianity and Sikhism are followed by 0.12% and 0.64% people respectively.

== Transport ==
=== Road ===
Doda is well-connected by road to other places in Jammu and Kashmir and India by the NH 244.

=== Rail ===
Doda is not connected with railways. The nearest railway station is Udhampur railway station located at a distance of 100 kilometres.

=== Air ===
The nearest airport is Jammu Airport located at a distance of 167 kilometres. There are plans to construct an airport in the neighbouring district city of Kishtwar. Upon its completion, the nearest airport at Kishtwar will be around 63 kilometres.

== See also ==
- Government Degree College, Doda
