= Doda district =

District in Jammu and Kashmir

- District of Jammu and Kashmir administered by India
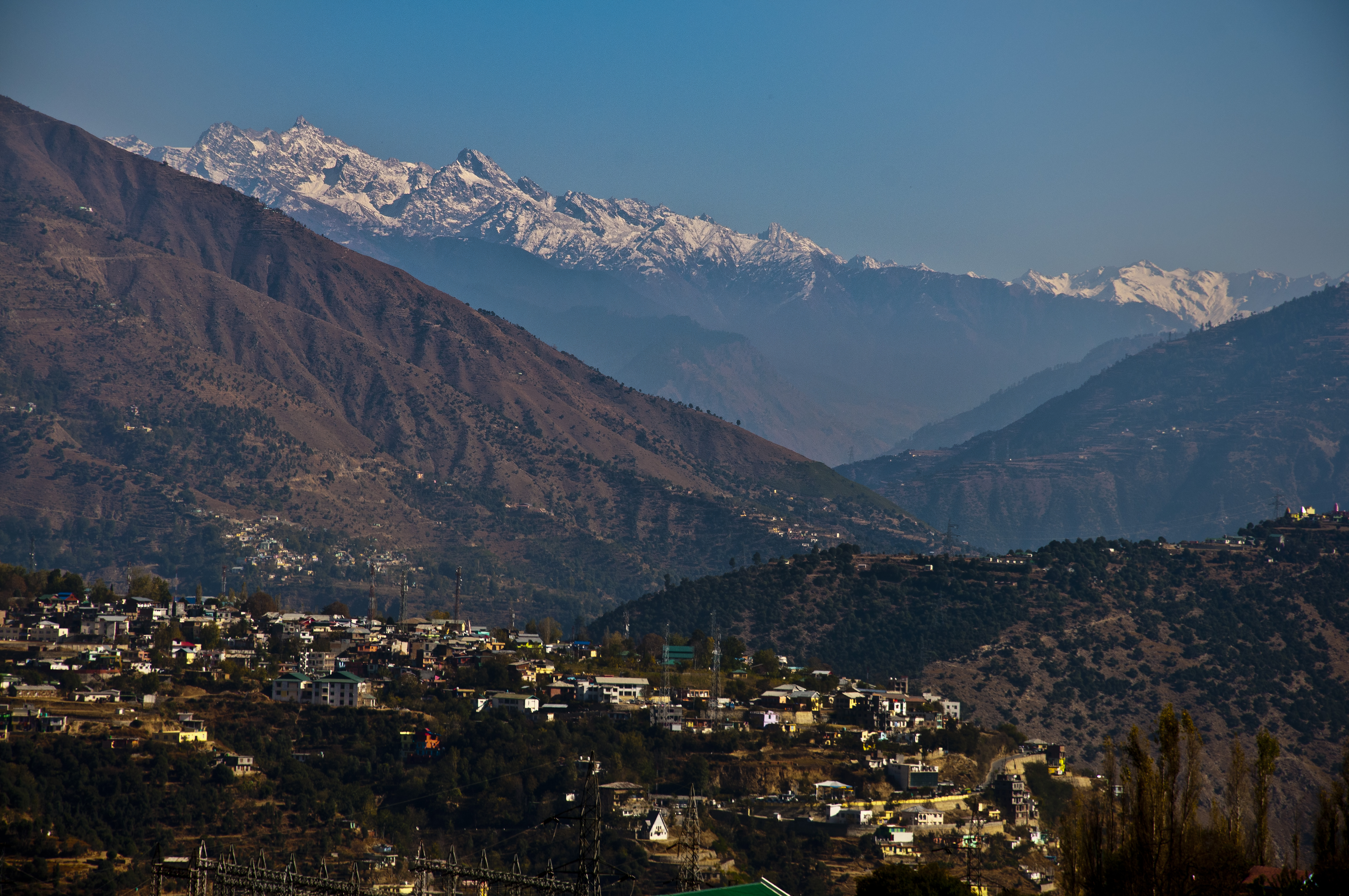
- View of Doda city

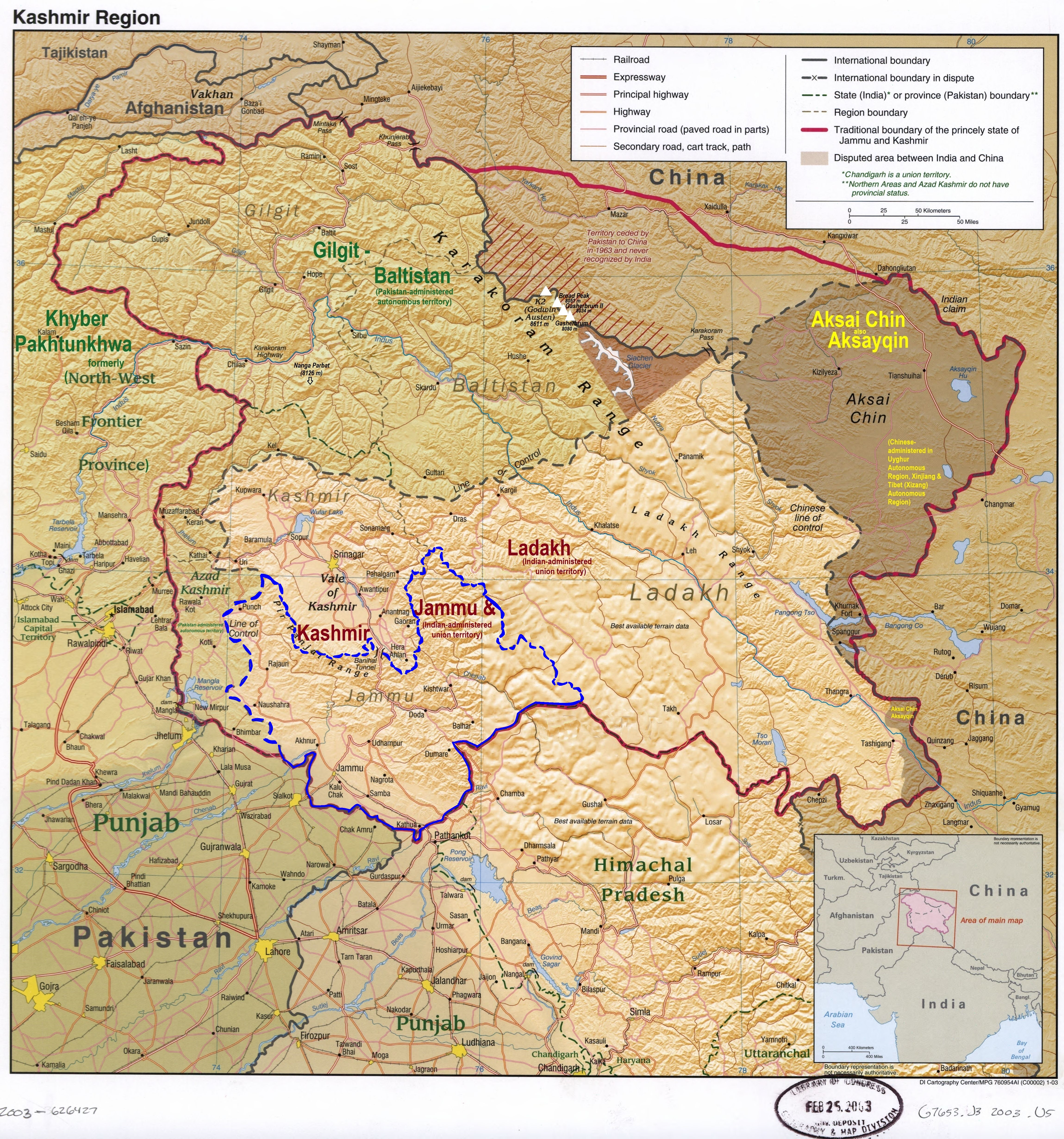
- Doda district is in the eastern part of the Jammu division (shown with neon blue boundary) of Indian-administered Jammu and Kashmir (shaded in tan in the disputed Kashmir region
- Interactive map of Doda district
- Coordinates (Doda): 33.13°N 75.57°E
- Administering country: India
- Union Territory: Jammu and Kashmir
- Division: Jammu
- Parliamentary Constituency: Udhampur
- Headquarters: Doda

Government
  - District Magistrate: Harvinder Singh (IAS)
  - Senior Superintendent of Police: Sandeep Mehta (JKPS)
  - Conservator of Forests: Dr Arashdeep Singh (IFS)

Area
  - Total: 2,625 km^{2} (1,014 sq mi)

Population (2011)
  - Total: 409,936
  - Density: 156.2/km^{2} (404.5/sq mi)
  - Urban: 32,689
  - Rural: 377,247

Demographics
  - Literacy: 64.68%
  - Sex ratio: 919
- Time zone: UTC+05:30 (IST)
- Vehicle registration: JK-06
- Major highways: NH 244
- Website: doda.nic.in

Doda district is an administrative district of the Jammu division of Indian-administered Jammu and Kashmir in the disputed Kashmir region. Doda covers 2,625 square kilometers. The district headquarters is Doda.

== Administration ==
The district consists of 18 tehsils: Thathri, Bhaderwah, Doda, Mohalla, Bhagwa, Assar, Bhalla, Gundna, Marmat, Kahara, Gandoh (Bhalessa), Bhella, Bharat Bagla, Chiralla, Chilly Pingal, Phagsoo and Kastigarh.

== Climate ==
The climate of the area is not uniform due to its wide variations in altitude. The area, in general, enjoys a temperate to sub-tropical climate. The climate of the district is almost dry and rainfall is scanty. The temperature varies from place to place. Ramban and Doda tehsils are warmer, while regions like Dessa Valley, tehsil Bhagwah, Gundna, Padder, Marwah and Warwan remain snow-bound for five-six months of the year. Summer is generally without precipitation. Almost all regions experiences snowfall in the winter, either in the form of snowfall in higher regions or as rainfall in the lower regions. Monsoons prevail from July to September. Rainfall in the Doda district is heavy during July and September. The average annual rainfall is 926 mm and snowfall of about 135 mm.

== History ==
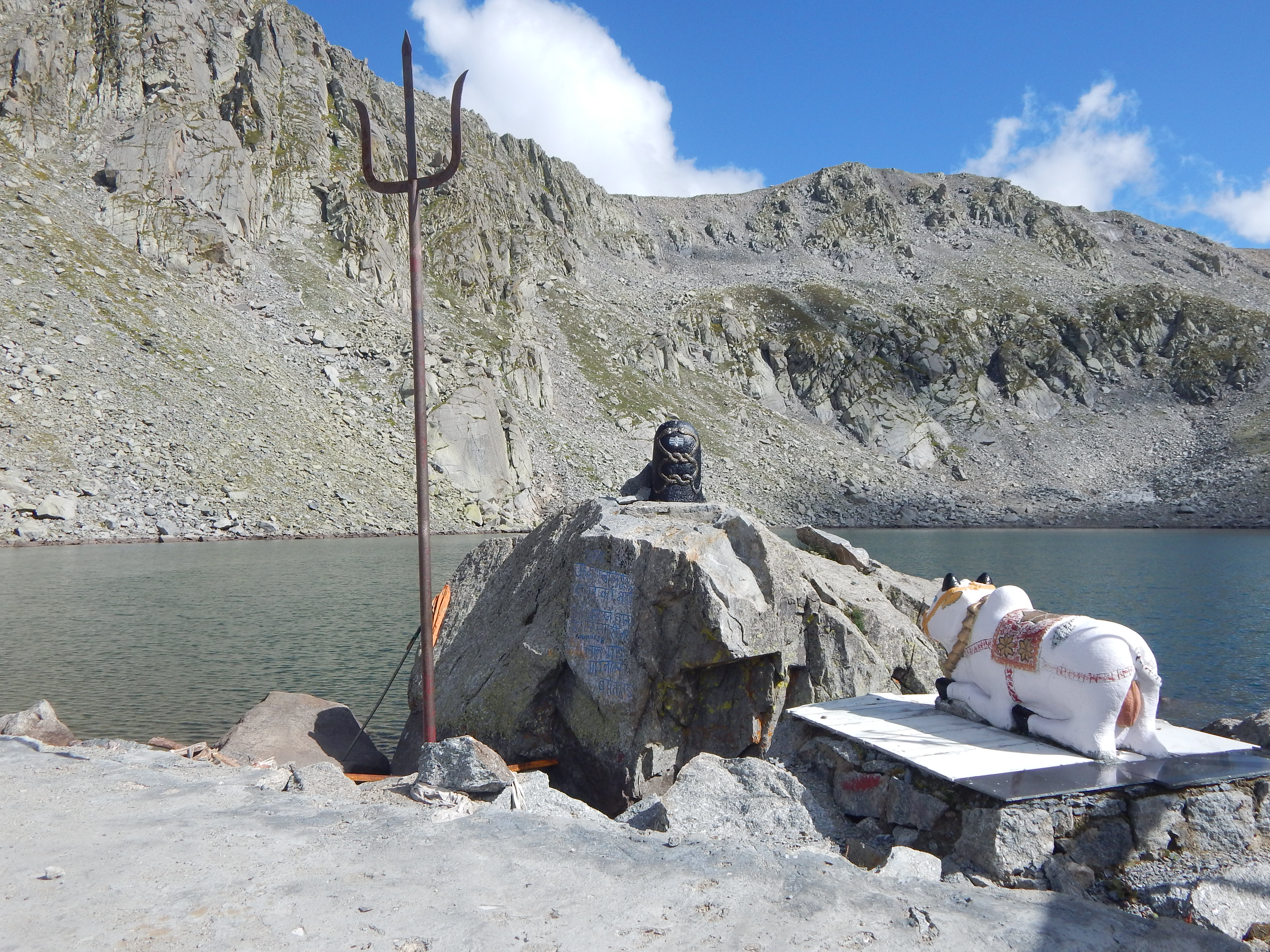
Kailash Kund lake, Doda district

The demography of Doda district is complex compared to neighbouring districts, because of its very diverse population. In the past, Doda was largely inhabited by a Sarazi population before people started settling here from Kashmir and other adjoining areas. It got the name Doda due to the opium plant, known as doddi in the local language. Kashmiri populations settled here in the 17th and 18th centuries. Sumantra Bose says repression by feudal classes elsewhere drew people to the districts of Doda, Ramban and Kishtwar.

The Doda district consists of areas drawn from the ancient principalities of Kishtwar and Bhadarwah, both of which became part of a district by the name of 'Udhampur' in the princely state of Jammu and Kashmir.

The district of Doda in Jammu and Kashmir has a long history intertwined with legends and stories of various rulers and dynasties. According to records from the State Revenue Department, the district got its name from its headquarters in Doda, which was named after a migrant from Multan, a utensil maker. He was persuaded by one of the ancient rulers of Kishtwar to settle in the area and establish a utensil factory. Over time, the name Deeda was distorted into Doda.

The early history of Doda is not well documented, with few chronicles available about the rulers of Kishtwar. The settlement reports indicate that the area was ruled by various groups including Ranas, Rajas, and independent chiefs from time to time, including the Jaral, Ranas, Katoch Rajas, Bhaus Manhases, Chibs, Thakkars, Wanis, and Gakkars. In 1822 AD, Doda was conquered by Maharaja Gulab Singh and became the winter capital of the Kishtwar state.

The Fort of Doda was significant in the district's history and was one of the seventy forts in Jammu province, according to author Thakur Kahan Singh Balowria. The fort served as the office of the Thanedar and provided storage space for armaments and food grains. The fort was also built to protect against potential attacks from the Bhaderwah Rajas. The fort was made of unbaked bricks and had walls that were four feet wide and forty to fifty feet high, with dome-like towers at the corners. The fort was demolished in 1952 and as of 2023, the Government Boys Higher Secondary School occupies its site.

English traveller G.T. Vigne visited Doda in 1829 and described his journey through the district. He mentions traveling through a deep and rocky nullah which joins the Chenab River, (Note: The Nullah traversed by Vigne is most likely the Neeru river, which joins the Chenab at Pul Doda.) and then crossing the river over a dangerous bridge in the Himalayas. Vigne writes about the bridge in Doda, a strong rope stretched from one bank to the other, tied to rocks. A wooden structure was placed over the rope and additional ropes were tied to it, allowing the structure to move back and forth. He also encountered another type of bridge, which was crossed on foot, made of small ropes bound with pieces of bark and woven into a thick rope. Hanging ropes were provided for support.

The area that includes the tehsil of Bhaderwah has a long history dating back to the 10th century. In 1846, Doda and Kishtwar became part of the newly created Jammu and Kashmir state after the Amritsar pact between the British government, Lahore Darbar, and Raja Gulab Singh of Jammu. Bhaderwah was once a principality with 15 administrative units and has a recorded history going back to the Rajatarangini of Kalhana. The state of Bhadhrwah was established in the 15th century by a Sicon of the Baloria family of Bilawar. It was later ruled by the Raja of Chamb until Raja Nagpal became the ruler in the 16th century. Bhaderwah was then ruled by Nagpal's descendants until it was captured by the Kishtwar Raja. It became part of Chamba in 1821 and was transferred to Jammu Darbar in 1846. During this time, Bhaderwah was military-administered Label was appointed as the Kardar. The Bhaderwah Jagir was later bestowed upon Raja Amar Singh of Jammu and then to his son, Raja Hari Singh. When Raja Hari Singh became the Maharaja of J&K in 1925, he dissolved his Jagirs and converted Bhaderwah into a tehsil of Udhampur in 1931.

In 1948, the erstwhile Udhampur district was partitioned into the present Udhampur district, containing the Udhampur and Ramanagar tehsils, and 'Doda' district containing the Ramban, Bhadarwah, Thathri and Kishtwar tehsils.

In 2006, Ramban was made into an independent district and the hilly area to the east of the present Doda district was separated as the Kishtwar district. The remaining areas include the Doda tehsil carved out of Kishtwar and the original Bhadarwah, now divided into three tehsils.

In 1990s, various incidents were reported about the suppression of Hindus by the Jihadist Militant organizations. In response to the rising terrorism, the government authorities made Village Defense Committee (VDC) in various villages. However some reports of VDC members indulging in criminal activities have also reported in the past. This incident also triggered the Terrorist organisations to target those who supported the VDCs, believing them to be anti-Muslim. Since 1990s, many such incidents of killings by Terrorist and VDCs have been reported.

=== June 2023 earthquakes ===
On 13 June 2023, an earthquake occurred at 01:33PM in Doda district. It was centred near the town of Thathri and registered a magnitude of 5.0 on the richter scale. Several secondary low-intensity earthquakes and aftershocks followed over the next few weeks. At least 56 buildings had collapsed and 369 others were damaged in Kishtwar. Dozens of buildings including a hospital were also damaged in Bhaderwah. At least five people were injured and hundreds were displaced.

== Demographics ==
Historical population
Year	Pop.	±%
1901	102,011	—
1911	112,009	+9.8%
1921	117,759	+5.1%
1931	127,477	+8.3%
1941	140,446	+10.2%
1951	147,489	+5.0%
1961	154,532	+4.8%
1971	170,787	+10.5%
1981	224,197	+31.3%
1991	290,727	+29.7%
2001	372,613	+28.2%
2011	476,835	+28.0%
† 1951 and 1991 populations are estimated Source: Census of India

According to the 2011 census, Doda district has a population of 409,936, roughly equal to the nation of Malta. This gives it a ranking of 556th in India (out of a total of 640). The district has a population density of 79 inhabitants per square kilometre (200/sq mi). Its population growth rate over the decade 2001–2011 was 27.89%.

Doda has a sex ratio of 922 females for every 1000 males (this varies with religion), and a literacy rate of 65.97%. 7.97% of the population lives in urban areas. Scheduled Castes and Scheduled Tribes make up 13.03% and 9.57% of the population respectively.

=== Religion ===
Religion in Doda district (2011)
Religion	Percent
Islam	53.82%
Hinduism	45.77%
Other or not stated	0.41%

The district has a Muslim majority 53.82%, with Hindus constituting 45.77% of the population and the remainder consisting of Christians, Sikhs, Buddhists and Jains.

Doda's society is a mixture of all religions with Hindus and Muslims being two major communities. The population ratio between the Muslims and the Hindus as per the census report of 2011 is around 54:46. Muslims of the region are mostly ethnic Kashmiris and are culturally and linguistically connected to the people of Kashmir.

Tehsil	Muslim	Hindu	Others
Doda	52.23	47.33	0.44
Thathri	52.1	47.08	0.82
Gandoh	72.43	27.43	0.14
Bhaderwah	41.71	58.02	0.27

=== Sex ratio & literacy rate ===
Doda district: religion, gender ratio, and % urban of population, according to the 2011 Census.
	Hindu	Muslim	Christian	Sikh	Buddhist	Jain	Other	Not stated	Total
Total	187,621	220,614	472	422	21	22	42	722	409,936
Total	45.77%	53.82%	0.12%	0.10%	0.01%	0.01%	0.01%	0.18%	100.00%
Male	98,252	114,372	324	286	9	11	24	363	213,641
Female	89,369	106,242	148	136	12	11	18	359	196,295
Gender ratio (% female)	47.6%	48.2%	31.4%	32.2%	57.1%	50.0%	42.9%	49.7%	47.9%
Sex ratio (no. of females per 1,000 males)	910	929	–	–	–	–	–	989	919
Urban	9,786	22,668	40	153	0	14	0	28	32,689
Rural	177,835	197,946	432	269	21	8	42	694	377,247
% Urban	5.2%	10.3%	8.5%	36.3%	0.0%	63.6%	0.0%	3.9%	8.0%

Sex Ratio in Doda District in 2011 Census. (no. females per 1,000 males)
Religion (and population)	Sex Ratio
Muslim (pop 220,614)	929
Hindu (pop 187,621)	910
Other (pop 1,701)	673
Total (pop 409,936)	919

=== Languages ===
Languages of Doda district (2011)
1. Kashmiri (41.6%)
2. Bhadarwahi (20.0%)
3. Siraji (13.8%)
4. Gojri (7.53%)
5. Hindi (5.20%)
6. Dogri (3.96%)
7. Pahadi (2.43%)
8. Haryanvi (1.55%)
9. Gaddi (0.78%)
10. Others (3.12%)

Prominent Scholar Sumantra Bose states that the plurality of population of Doda speaks Kashmiri as their mother language. A study conducted in 2014 identified 40% of the population as Kashmiri-speaking. The Pahadi languages are spoken by the second largest group: Bhadarwahi and Sarazi are the main ones. Others in the district speak Gojri and Dogri.

Doda's population comprises different communities who live together peacefully despite following different religions and speak different languages.

== Administration ==
Administratively, the district has 406 villages. Doda District has been divided into three subdivisions viz., Doda, Thathri, Bhaderwah and Bhalessa (Gandoh). It has eighteen tehsils.

- Marmat
- Kahara
- Bhella
- Bharth Bagla
- Chirala
- Chilly Pingal
- Gandoh (Bhalessa)
- Gundna
- Kastigarh
- Phagsoo
- Thathri

=== Villages ===
- Badroon
- Bankanthawa
- Binola
- Bloriya
- Sunarthawa
- Amritgarh
- Dhara

== Politics ==
Doda district has three assembly constituencies: Bhaderwah, Doda and Doda West. While it is the part of Udhampur Lok Sabha constituency.

=== Terrorism ===
Doda had a history of terrorism, with one of the highest concentration of militants in Jammu and Kashmir. According to local authorities, about 200 militants were active in the district in the early 2000s.

Militants targeted the Hindu and Muslim villagers. Some anti-social outfits mostly misused the VDCs. A report said that the 489 civilians had been killed in the region as of 2005.

There have been a number of killings of innocent civilians by militants and anti-social outfits including:

- On June 19, 1998, 25 Hindus were brutally massacred by militants in Chapnari village of Doda district.
- In August 1998, four Muslims were allegedly killed by VDC members in Karada village.
- On 25 October 1998, four Muslim civilians were shot dead, allegedly by Indian troops in Doda, according to police and local residents.
- On 3 August 2001, 17 Hindu Civilians brutally massacred by Militants in ladder village.
- The 2006 Doda massacre in which 35 Hindu civilians were killed on 30 April 2006.
- Massacre of 19 Hindu villagers in Thawa village on 15 May 2006.
- On 15 May 2019, Nayeem Ahmad Shah was killed by cow vigilantes in Bhaderwah, while he was not carrying any animal during attack. Eight Hindus were arrested in this case.
- Three terrorists were killed in a gunbattle with security forces on June 26, 2024. The gunfight took place after the Army cordoned off a hideout with four terrorists, three of whom were killed.
- Four Army personnel including an officer and a cop (Captain Brijesh Thapa, Naik D Rajesh, Sepoy Bijendra and Sepoy Ajay Naruka) were killed on 15th July 2024 during a gunfight. The encounter took place during a cordon and search operation at Dhari Gote Urarbagi in Desa forest belt, some 55 km from Doda town. In a statement, the terror group 'Kashmir Tigers', a shadow group of the banned outfit Jaish-e-Mohammad said the clash and gunfire erupted while the security forces launched a search operation for the "Mujahideen".
