= Bhaderwah =

Town and sub-district in Jammu and Kashmir, India

- Tehsil
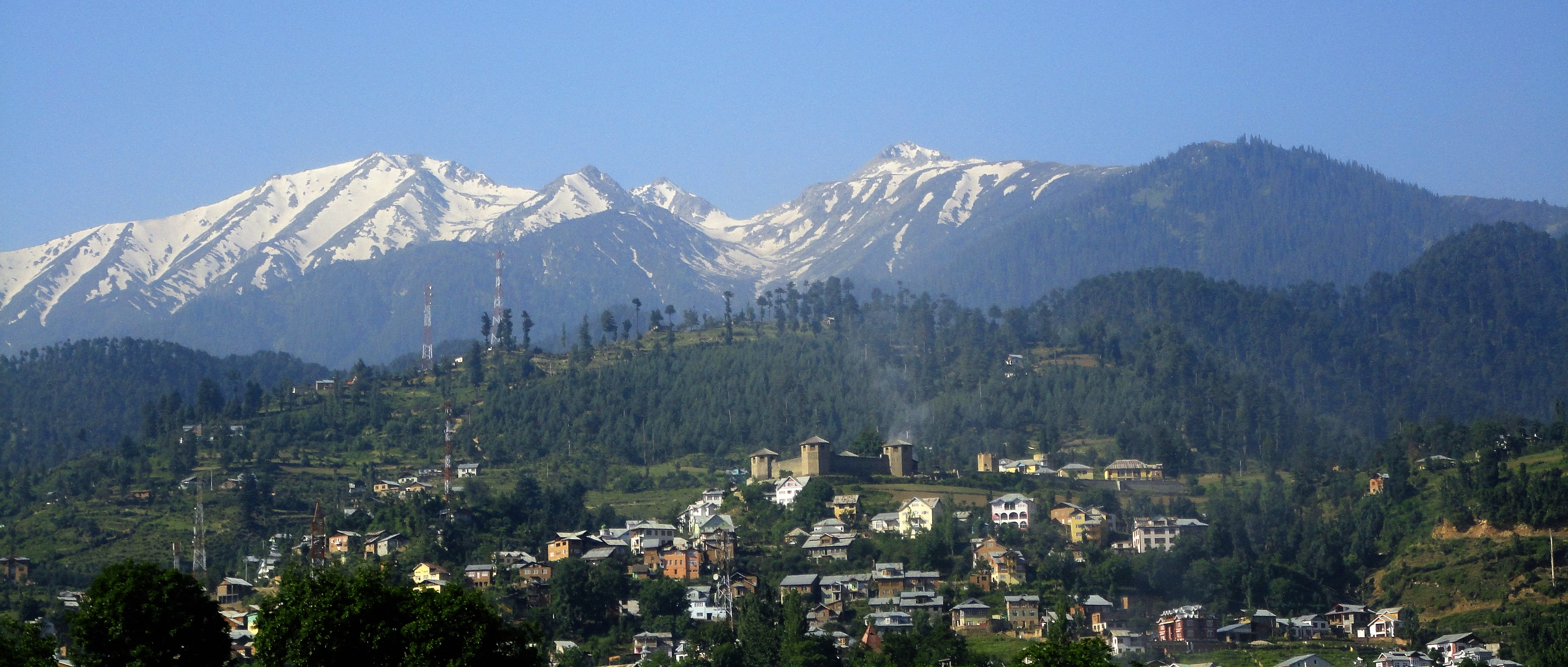
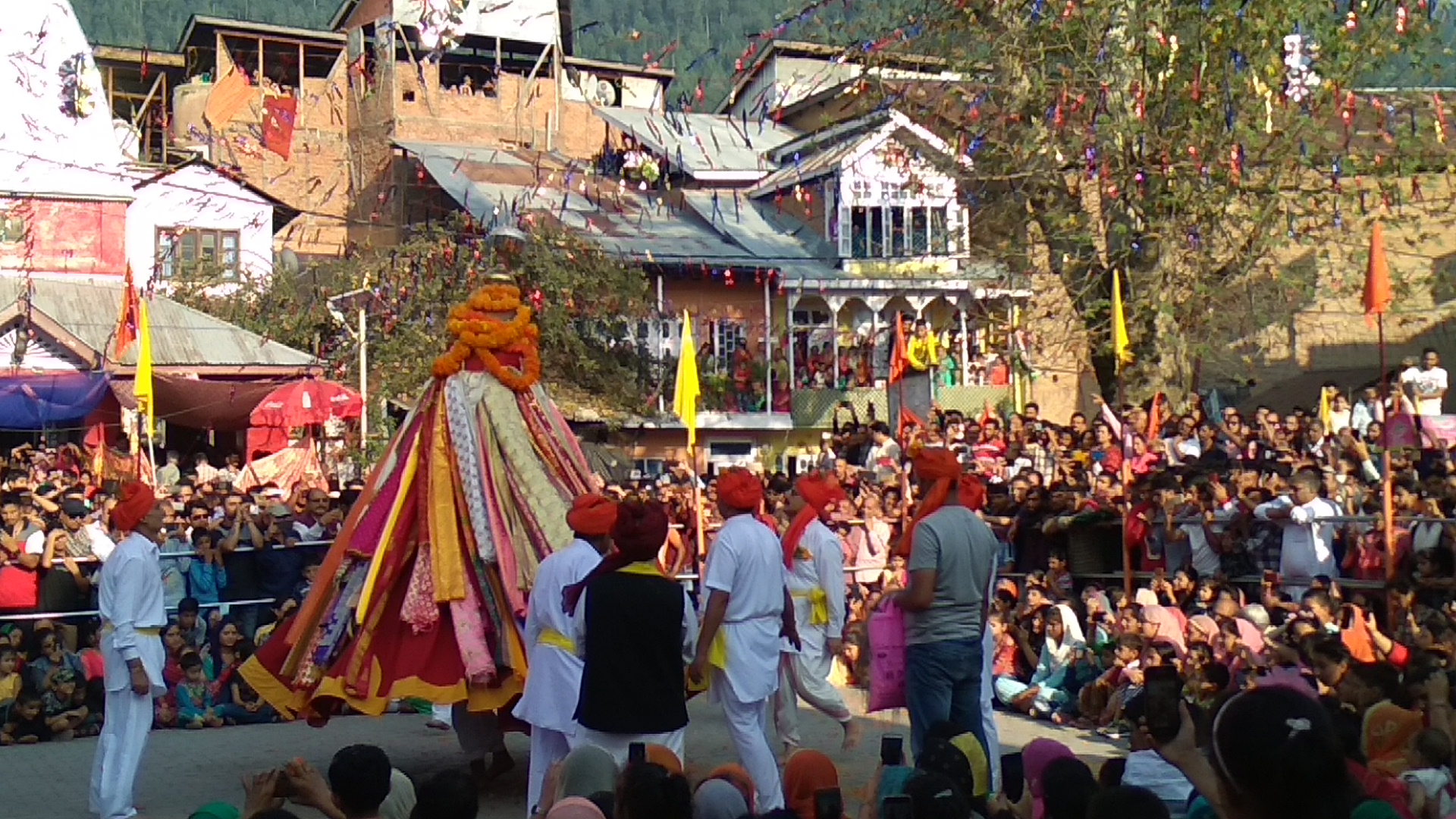
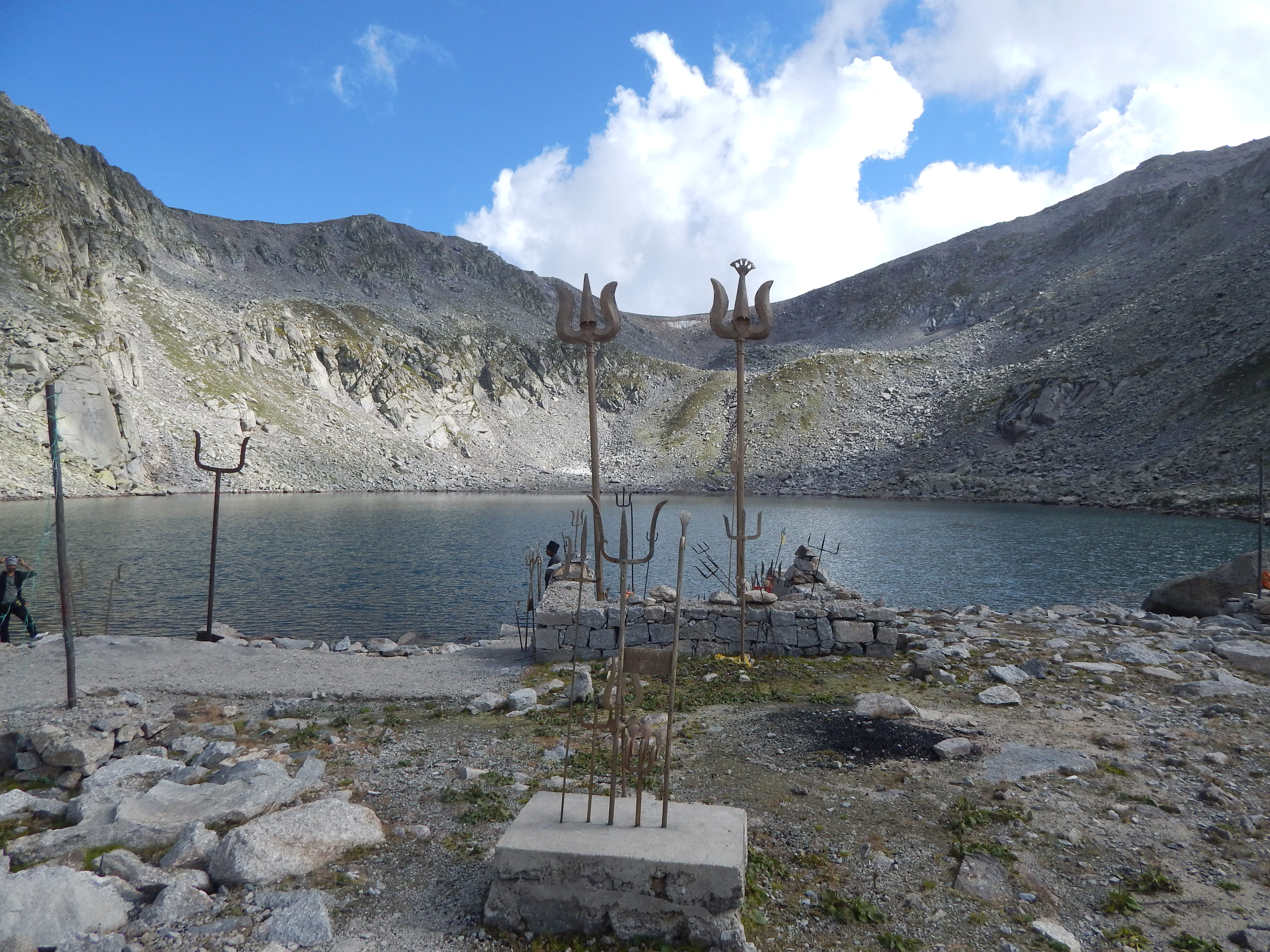
- from top, left to right: view of Bhadarwah town with Kailash Kund range in the background; Mela Patt, a folk celebration in Bhadarwah; Kailash Kund Lake or Kablas Dal

- Location in Jammu and Kashmir, India Bhaderwah (India)
- Coordinates: 32.980033°N 75.713706°E
- Country: India
- Union Territory: Jammu & Kashmir
- Division: Jammu
- District: Doda

Area
  - Total: 112.17 km^{2} (43.31 sq mi)
- Elevation: 1,613 m (5,292 ft)

Population (2011)
  - Total: 75,376
  - Density: 671.98/km^{2} (1,740.4/sq mi)
- Demonym: Bhaderwahi

Languages
  - Spoken languages: Bhaderwahi, Kashmiri, Dogri, Gaddi, Hindi, Gojri, Khașāli
- Time zone: UTC +05:30 (Indian Standard Time)
- Postal code: 182222
- Additional District Commissioner Bhaderwah: Sunil Kumar
- BDC Chairperson: Omi Chand
- Website: bhaderwah.com

Bhaderwah (also spelled Bhadarwah, locally also known as Bhadarkashi) is a town and a tehsil in the Doda district of Jammu Division of Jammu and Kashmir, India.

== Etymology and names ==
The name Bhaderwah derives from the Sanskrit word Bhadarwasa meaning "a place of living of supreme and intellect mankind". Alternatively, the name may derive from Bhadarkashi, a name given to the town for the ancient temple of Hindu goddess Bhadrakali located in the area. The area is called Bhadar Avkash (lit. 'a good resting place') and Bhadar Pura in the 1148 CE Sanskrit chronicle Rajatarangini of Kalhana, with the former likely a name given to the region by foreign Kashmiri rulers. The area is sometimes referred to as Chota Kashmir or "little Kashmir" because of topographic similarities with the Kashmir Valley, and is called Bhadarkashi by the Hindus of the region.

== History ==
Bhaderwah was ruled by its native rulers up until 8th century AD. During the 10th-11th centuries AD, it came under the rule of Ananta and Kalsha of neighbouring Kashmir. The region finds mentions in the 12th century chronicle, Rajatarangini. Local hill chieftains or Ranas of the Pal clan (originally Chanderbansi Baloria Rajputs from Billawar princely state) ruled the area during the 8th-16th centuries AD. The lineage of Pal rulers started from Raja Radhik Pal, (son of Raja Bhogpal of Balor and brother of Sadhkpal who was given principality of Basohli) followed by his son Bhadra Pal (named after Bhaderkali temple constructed by Raja Radhik Pal), Prithvi Pal, Ajay Pal, and many more. According to folk history, a local ruler named Nag Pal impressed Mughal emperor Akbar in the 16th century with his spiritual prowess, compelling the emperor to make several offerings to him. The event is since commemorated annually during a celebration known as Mela Patt, on Naga Panchami.

By the end of the 16th century, it was annexed by the rulers of Chamba, who exercised influence over the Pal Rajas. In 1820, the cousin of last ruler of Pal dynasty, Raja Pahadchand, ascended the throne and fought against Chamba forces who were led by Wazir Nathu. Raja Pahadchand won the battle but Wazir Nathu attacked again on Bhaderwah with the help of the Sikhs and captured Bhaderwah. The Raja of Chamba gave the throne of Bhaderwah to his younger brother Parakram Singh. After the death of Parakram Singh, Raja Zorawar Singh was made Governor of Bhaderwah. Many Kashmiri shawl weavers, settled in the town, during this time. The region became part of the Dogra Kingdom of Jammu and Kashmir following the Treaty of Amritsar in 1846, according to which the possessions of Chamba state to the west of Ravi River, including the Bhaderwah principality, were given to Gulab Singh.

=== Dogra rule ===
In 1886, Bhaderwah was bestowed as a jagir to Amar Singh, prime minister of the Dogra Kingdom, by Maharaja Pratap Singh. In 1890, the first census was conducted in Bhaderwah. Amar Singh exercised control over the jagir until his death in 1912, following which it passed onto his son Hari Singh, who would later become the Maharaja of the princely state. Bhaderwah's status as a jagir ended in 1930, and it was fully absorbed into the princely state, becoming a tehsil of district Udhampur in 1931. The Jagir comprised Bhadarwah, Bhalessa and the vast area left of river Chenab from Thathri up to Marmat (Doda).

== Culture ==
Bhaderwah is also a land of fairs and festivals like Mela Pat, Subar Dhar Mela, Kud dance, Pahari folk songs and music. It also has heritage sites like the Ratangarh Fort, hundred-years-old Jamia Masjid, and an ancient Vasuki Nag Temple. The area has rich culture of various communities.

== Demographics ==
Historical population
Year	Pop.	±% p.a.
1911	2,563	—
1921	2,603	+0.15%
1931	2,895	+1.07%
1941	2,989	+0.32%
1951	3,559	+1.76%
1961	4,129	+1.50%
1971	5,211	+2.35%
1981	6,075	+1.55%
2001	10,516	+2.78%
2011	11,084	+0.53%

According to the 2011 census of India, the Bhaderwah tehsil had a population of 75,376 while the population of the Bhaderwah town was 11,084. This gave the tehsil a population density of 670 persons per km^{2} (1,700 per square mile). Out of the total population of the tehsil, 39,051 individuals were male and 36,325 were female, giving it a sex ratio of 930 females for every 1000 males. The tehsil had a literacy rate of 75.51%. Scheduled castes formed 19.3% of the population, while scheduled tribes were 6.2%.

=== Religion ===
Religion in Bhaderwah (2011)
Religion	Percent
Hinduism	58.02%
Islam	41.71%
Other or not stated	0.27%

Per the 2011 census, Hindus formed a majority of Bhaderwah tehsil's population, constituting 58.02% of the total. The remaining population is mainly Muslim (41.71%) with small numbers of Christians (0.13%) and Sikhs (0.11%). Hindus have historically formed a majority in the region, with the former Bhaderwah Jagir recording a 61.13% Hindu majority in the 1911 census.

=== Languages ===
Languages of Bhaderwah (2011)
1. Bhadarwahi (52.7%)
2. Kashmiri (33.6%)
3. Dogri (4.73%)
4. Gaddi (3.35%)
5. Hindi (1.58%)
6. Gojri (1.54%)
7. Others (2.51%)

A majority of the population of Bhaderwah tehsil are speakers of the Bhadarwahi language, with around 53% of the total population speaking the language as a mother tongue, according to the 2011 census. The tehsil also had a large Kashmiri-speaking minority (33.6% of the total), and significant numbers of speakers of Dogri (4.7%), Gaddi (3.35%), Hindi (1.6%) and Gojri (1.5%) languages.

== Climate ==
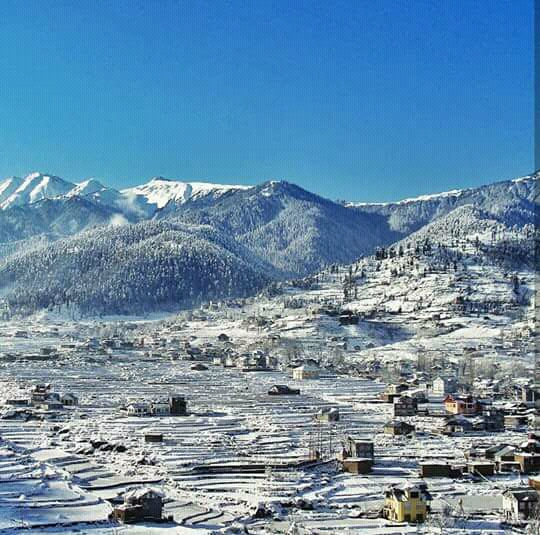
Bhaderwah under snow

Climate data for Bhaderwah (1991–2020, extremes 1977–2020)
Month	Jan	Feb	Mar	Apr	May	Jun	Jul	Aug	Sep	Oct	Nov	Dec	Year
Record high °C (°F)	21.8 (71.2)	24.8 (76.6)	29.7 (85.5)	32.6 (90.7)	38.4 (101.1)	39.3 (102.7)	39.4 (102.9)	37.2 (99.0)	35.1 (95.2)	32.4 (90.3)	28.7 (83.7)	22.9 (73.2)	39.4 (102.9)
Mean daily maximum °C (°F)	11.6 (52.9)	13.4 (56.1)	18.8 (65.8)	23.4 (74.1)	27.2 (81.0)	29.9 (85.8)	30.4 (86.7)	29.3 (84.7)	27.8 (82.0)	24.4 (75.9)	19.3 (66.7)	14.6 (58.3)	22.7 (72.9)
Mean daily minimum °C (°F)	−0.4 (31.3)	1.2 (34.2)	4.4 (39.9)	7.9 (46.2)	10.9 (51.6)	14.6 (58.3)	17.9 (64.2)	17.4 (63.3)	13.5 (56.3)	7.6 (45.7)	3.8 (38.8)	0.9 (33.6)	8.4 (47.1)
Record low °C (°F)	−10.8 (12.6)	−9.2 (15.4)	−6.5 (20.3)	−2.5 (27.5)	0.2 (32.4)	5.2 (41.4)	7.0 (44.6)	8.1 (46.6)	2.5 (36.5)	−3.0 (26.6)	−2.5 (27.5)	−10.3 (13.5)	−10.8 (12.6)
Average rainfall mm (inches)	133.6 (5.26)	177.3 (6.98)	151.1 (5.95)	116.5 (4.59)	83.8 (3.30)	83.4 (3.28)	129.6 (5.10)	136.4 (5.37)	94.0 (3.70)	28.5 (1.12)	36.7 (1.44)	55.0 (2.17)	1,227.9 (48.34)
Average rainy days	7.0	8.3	8.4	7.5	7.3	7.2	9.3	9.9	5.0	2.3	2.6	3.2	77.8
Average relative humidity (%) (at 17:30 IST)	63	63	55	52	52	54	64	68	62	52	55	57	58
Source: India Meteorological Department

== Tourism ==
Bhaderwah is an emerging tourist destination. Local administration is working to set Bhaderwah on the world tourism spot. The administration is emphasising on creating Shopping Malls, luxury hotels, gaming facilities, food courts, and other amenities to attract international and domestic tourists along with promotion of religious and historical destinations. The Vibrant Bhaderwah Festival, a 5-day program, including performances by Singers, fireworks, cultural performances, Film Screenings and many more. The festival is organised in collaboration by Directorate of Tourism Jammu, the District Administration Doda, the Academy of Art, Culture and Language, and the Bhaderwah Development Authority (BDA). The last festival was organised from 27 December 2023 to 31 December 2023. It concluded on New Year 2024. It was attended by more than one lakh people. Bhaderwah is also emerging as a destination for Wedding tourism and MICE tourism.

Bhaderwah can be reached from Udhampur Batote, with 55 km Udhampur-Batote via NH-1A, Batote to Pul Doda 50 km section by NH-1B, and then Pul Doda to Bhaderwah 30 km section.

=== Ropeway ===
Bhaderwah-Seojhdar ropeway, 8.80 km long planned ropeway from Bhaderwah to Seojhdar in Doda district], tenders for preparation of DPR have been invited in March 2025.

=== Tourist destination of Bhaderwah Valley ===
- Guldanda
- Padri Top
- Khellani Top
- Kellar Valley
- Chinta Valley
- Sonbain
- Jai Valley
- Padri Pass
- Bhallara Valley
- Shanani Valley
- Jantroon dhar

== See also ==
- Tourism in Jammu and Kashmir
