= Bhadarwahi language =

Native language of the people of Bhadarwah, Jammu and Kashmir

Bhadarwahi
- Bhadrawahi
- 𑚡𑚛𑚶𑚤𑚦𑚭𑚩𑚯 भद्रवाही بھدرواہی
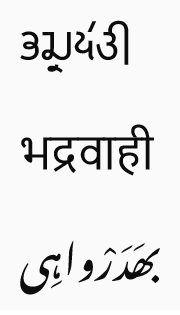
- Bhadarwahi written in Takri, Devanagari and Perso-arabic scripts
- Native to: Jammu and Kashmir, Himachal Pradesh
- Region: Jammu region
- Ethnicity: Bhadarwahis
- Native speakers: 120,000 (2011)
- Language family: Indo-European: Indo-Iranian; Indo-Aryan; Northern; Western Pahari; Bhadarwahi
- Dialects: Bhalesi; Bhadrawahi proper; Khasali; Padri
- Writing system: Devanagari, Takri, Perso-Arabic script

Language codes
- ISO 639-3: bhd
- Glottolog: bhad1241
- ELP: Bhadrawahi

Bhadarwahi (Bhadrawahi) is an indigenous language of the Indian subcontinent, belonging to the Western Pahari group. It is spoken by the Bhadarwahi people in Bhaderwah and its surrounding areas in the hills of the Jammu region of Jammu and Kashmir, India. The language traces its origins to Sanskrit, the ancient and indigenous linguistic heritage of the region, and has evolved naturally within the cultural context of the area.

The name Bhadarwahi can be understood either in a narrow sense as referring to the dialect, locally known as Bhiḍlāi, native to the Bhadarwah valley, or in a broader sense to cover the group of related dialects spoken in the wider region where Bhadarwahi proper is used as a lingua franca. In addition to Bhadarwahi proper, this group also includes Bhalesi, and Khasali (Khashali) dialect. The Churahi language is closely related.

The name of the language is spelt in the Takri as 𑚡𑚛𑚤𑚦𑚭𑚩𑚯. Variants include Bhaderwahi (𑚡𑚛𑚲𑚤𑚦𑚭𑚩𑚯), Baderwali (𑚠𑚛𑚲𑚤𑚦𑚭𑚥𑚯), Bhadri (𑚡𑚛𑚤𑚯), Badrohi (𑚠𑚛𑚶𑚤𑚴𑚩𑚯), Bhadlayi (𑚡𑚛𑚥𑚭𑚣𑚯), and Bhadlai (𑚡𑚛𑚥𑚭𑚃).

== Phonology ==
Vowels
	Front	Central	Back
High	iː		uː
Lower High	i		u
Mid	e eː		oː
Lower Mid		ə	o
Low			ɑː

Consonants
		Bilabial	Dental	Alveolar	Postalveolar	Retroflex	Palatal	Velar	Glottal
Nasal		m		n		ɳ	ɲ		
Stop	voiceless	p	t̪			ʈ	t͡ʃ	k	
Stop	aspirated	pʰ	t̪ʰ			ʈʰ	t͡ʃʰ	kʰ	
Stop	voiced	b	d̪			ɖ	d͡ʒ	ɡ	
Stop	breathy	bʱ	d̪ʱ			ɖʱ	d͡ʒʱ	ɡʱ	
Fricative	voiceless			s	ʃ		ç çʰ		h
Fricative	voiced			z zʱ					
Approximant		w		l			j		
Trill				r					
Flap or Tap						ɽ			

According to Masica (1991) there are a set of lateral retroflex affricates /ʈ͡ꞎ ɖ͡𝼅 ɖ͡𝼅ʱ/ from old /Cr/ clusters.

== Status ==
The language is commonly called Bhaderwahi. Some speakers may call it a dialect of Dogri. The language has no official status. It is classified by the United Nations Education, Scientific and Cultural Organisation (UNESCO) as "definitely endangered," meaning that many Bhadarwahi parents are not teaching it to their children and the number of native speakers is decreasing. Other languages, such as Kashmiri and Urdu/Hindi, are being spoken in the home in its place. This is a natural human tendency to pick up the language of people perceived as better off economically and/or socially.
