= List of villages in Budgam district =

This is an alphabetical list of villages in Budgam district, Jammu and Kashmir, India.

== A—D ==
- Aarizal
- Aripanthan
- Badran, Jammu and Kashmir
- Bagati Kani Pora
- Beerwah, Jammu and Kashmir
- Bon makhama
- Chak Dewan Lakhimandass
- Chattergam
- Chewdara
- Choon, Budgam
- Dadina
- Dooniwari

== E—H ==
- Gondipora
- Guda Sathu, Budgam
- Hanji-Bough
- Gariend Khurd
- Gariend Kalan

== I—L ==
- Ich Kot, Budgam
- Ichgam
- Ichehama
- Iskander Pora, Jammu and Kashmir
- Jawalpora, Budgam
- Kandoora
- Kanihama
- Khag, Jammu and Kashmir
- Lalpora, Jammu and Kashmir
- kanidajan, ch sharief
- Kakar Maran

== M—P ==
- Manchama
- Mazhom
- Meerpora
- Mulashulla
- Narawarah
- Ohangam
- Ompora
- Narkara
- Nasrullah Pora
- Otligam
- Peth Zanigam, Jammu and Kashmir
- Pethmakhama
- Purni Suder Shah
- PAIMUS Budgam

== Q—T ==
- Rathsun
- Sechin Banet
- Soibugh
- Sonapah
- sholipora

== U—X ==
- Wahabpora
- Wanihama
- wadwan
- waterhail
