= Aripanthan =

Village in Jammu and Kashmir, India

- Panchayat Halqa Model Village
- The Township And Commonality Of Aripanthan Along Western Banks Of River Sukhnag
- Location in Jammu and Kashmir, India Aripanthan (India)
- Coordinates: 34.061°N 74.575°E
- Country: India
- State: Jammu and Kashmir
- District: Budgam
- Tehsil: Beerwah
- Post Office: Magam 193401

Population (2011)
  - Total: 5,268

Languages
  - Official: Kashmiri, Urdu, Hindi, Dogri, English
- Time zone: UTC+5:30 (IST)
- Pin Code: 193401
- Area codes: 01951,+91
- Vehicle registration: JK04

Aripanthan is a village and panchayat halqa in Beerwah tehsil of Budgam district in the Indian union territory of Jammu and Kashmir. It is situated at the centre of tehsil Beerwah and tehsil Magam. It is located about 27 km (17 mi) west from summer capital of Jammu and Kashmir, Srinagar and about 28 km (17 mi) north from district headquarters in Budgam.

== Geographical location ==
Aripanthan is located between latitude 34.061°N and longitude 74.575°E at the base of Pir Panjal range. It has an average elevation of 1,585 m (5,200 ft) above mean sea level in Mumbai. It is surrounded by plains to the north, east, south, and orchard hills from west. The landscape is made up of plateau-like terraces known as karewas. The total area of village is 462.62 ha (1,143.2 acres).

== Demography ==
	percent
Male ♂	51.99%
Female ♀	48.01%
Male and Female Population, Aripanthan

As of 2011 India Census, Aripanthan has a total population of 5,268, out of which males are 2,739 and females are 2,529 in number. Total population in the age group of 0–6 years is 1,044, out of which males are 606 and females 438 in number. As of 2011 census Aripanthan has total 899 family residing. Number of literates as per census is 2772 out of which males are 1,636 and females 1136 in number. Total number of illiterates is 2,496, out of which males are 1,103 and females are 1,393 in number.

== Religion ==
Religions
Religion
Suni Muslims	100%
Others	0%
Distribution of Population on Religion

People in all the three hamlets of Aripanthan follow Sunni Islam. Religious education is imparted through madrassas early in the morning. Moreover, several religious organizations, like Jamaat-e-Islami, Karwan-i-Islami, Dawat-e-Islami, Tehreek-e-Sawt ul Awliya and many others, impart the education of the Quran and Sunnah.

== Transport ==
Aripanthan is situated at the center of Beerwah, Magam and Khag. It is connected to summer capital of Jammu and Kashmir, Srinagar via Magam at a distance of 27 km (17 mi) and district headquarters in Budgam via Beerwah at a distance of 28 km (17 mi). There is also a small taxi stand situated at Aripanthan, from which taxis can be hired to various locations like Khag, Tosamaidan, Beerwah, Budgam, Doodhpathri & Srinagar. Besides this taxi service is offered by the taxi stand to various areas, like Khag, Poshkar, Beerwah, Iskanderpora, Lolipora (Lalpora), Magam and Srinagar.

The nearest Railway Station is Mazhama Railway Station about 8 km (5.0 mi) away. The closest airport is Srinagar International Airport about 35 km (22 mi) away.

== Infrastructure ==
The Government Boys Secondary School is one of the oldest high school in the area imparting higher education to the common folks, thus Aripanthan enjoys a central position in educational field also. Besides this, other schools of Aripanthan are:

1. Govt. Boys Secondary School Aripanthan
2. Govt. Girls Middle School Aripanthan
3. Al-Falah School Aripanthan

A large number of primary and lower primary are also operational in the area. Recently an electric sub station of 6.3 Mva capacity has been sanctioned which is being constructed, which will improve the power scenario in and around Aripanthan. JK bank small branch is functional in village, with an ATM also.
