= Nagam, Jammu and Kashmir =

Nagam
- City
- Location in Jammu and Kashmir, India Nagam (India)
- Coordinates: 33.92°N 74.73°E
- Country: India
- Union Territory: Jammu and Kashmir
- District: Budgam

Population (2011)
  - Total: 10,635

Languages
  - Official: Kashmiri, Urdu, Hindi, Dogri, English
- Time zone: UTC+5:30 (IST)
- PIN: 191113

Nagam is a town and municipality in Budgam district of the Indian union territory of Jammu and Kashmir. The town is located 16 kilometres from district headquarters Budgam.

== Demographics ==
According to the 2011 census of India, Nagam has 569 households. The literacy rate of Nagam was 65.66% compared to 67.16% of Jammu and Kashmir. In Nagam, Male literacy stands at 78.59% while the female literacy rate was 51.95%.

== Transport ==
=== Rail ===
The nearest railway stations to Nagam is Budgam railway station located at a distance of 17 kilometres (11 mi). However, Nagam shares the same distance with Srinagar Railway Station as well.

=== Air ===
The nearest airport is Srinagar International Airport located at a distance of 17 kilometres (11 mi) and is a 40-minute drive.

== See also ==
- Bagati Kani Pora
- Dooniwari
- Budgam
- Jammu and Kashmir
- Doodhpathri
