= Ali Mohammad Dar =

Indian politician

Member of Jammu and Kashmir Legislative Assembly
- Incumbent
- Assumed office 8 October 2024
- Preceded by: Javaid Mustafa Mir
- Constituency: Chadoora
- In office 1996–2002
- Preceded by: Mir Mustafa
- Succeeded by: Javaid Mustafa Mir

Personal details
- Political party: Jammu & Kashmir National Conference
- Profession: Politician

Ali Mohammad Dar is an Indian politician from Jammu and Kashmir. Born in the village of Dooniwari, he serves as a member of the Jammu and Kashmir Legislative Assembly, representing Chadoora constituency since October 2024. Dar began his political career in 1977 as a member of the Jammu & Kashmir National Conference party. He was first elected to the Jammu and Kashmir Legislative Assembly during the 1996 assembly elections.

== See also ==
- 2024 Jammu & Kashmir Legislative Assembly election
- Jammu and Kashmir Legislative Assembly
