= Mulashulla =

Mulashulla or Mulshul is a village in tehsil Beerwah of the district Budgam of the Jammu and Kashmir.

== See also ==
Otligam

Sechin Bonit

Gondipora

Beerwah,

Jammu and Kashmir
