= Purni Suder Shah =

Purni Suder Shah Purn Suder Shah
- Village
- Location in Jammu and Kashmir, India Purni Suder Shah (India)
- Coordinates: 34.118478°N 74.620°E
- Country: India
- Union Territory: Jammu and Kashmir
- District: Budgam

Population (2011)
  - Total: 300
  - Density: 200/km^{2} (520/sq mi)

Languages
  - Official: Kashmiri, Urdu, Hindi, Dogri, English
- Time zone: UTC+5:30 (IST)
- Pin Code: 193401
- Area codes: 01951, +91
- Vehicle registration: JK 04

Purni Suder Shah or Purn Suder Shah, also known as The Dwelling Place Of Sufi Saint Suder Shah, is a village in the Budgam district in the Indian union territory of Jammu and Kashmir. It lies in the Narbal tehsil of district Budgam, on the eastern side of Mazhom railway station. It is a small village and only a few generations have lived here. It is recognised for its vegetation and agriculture.

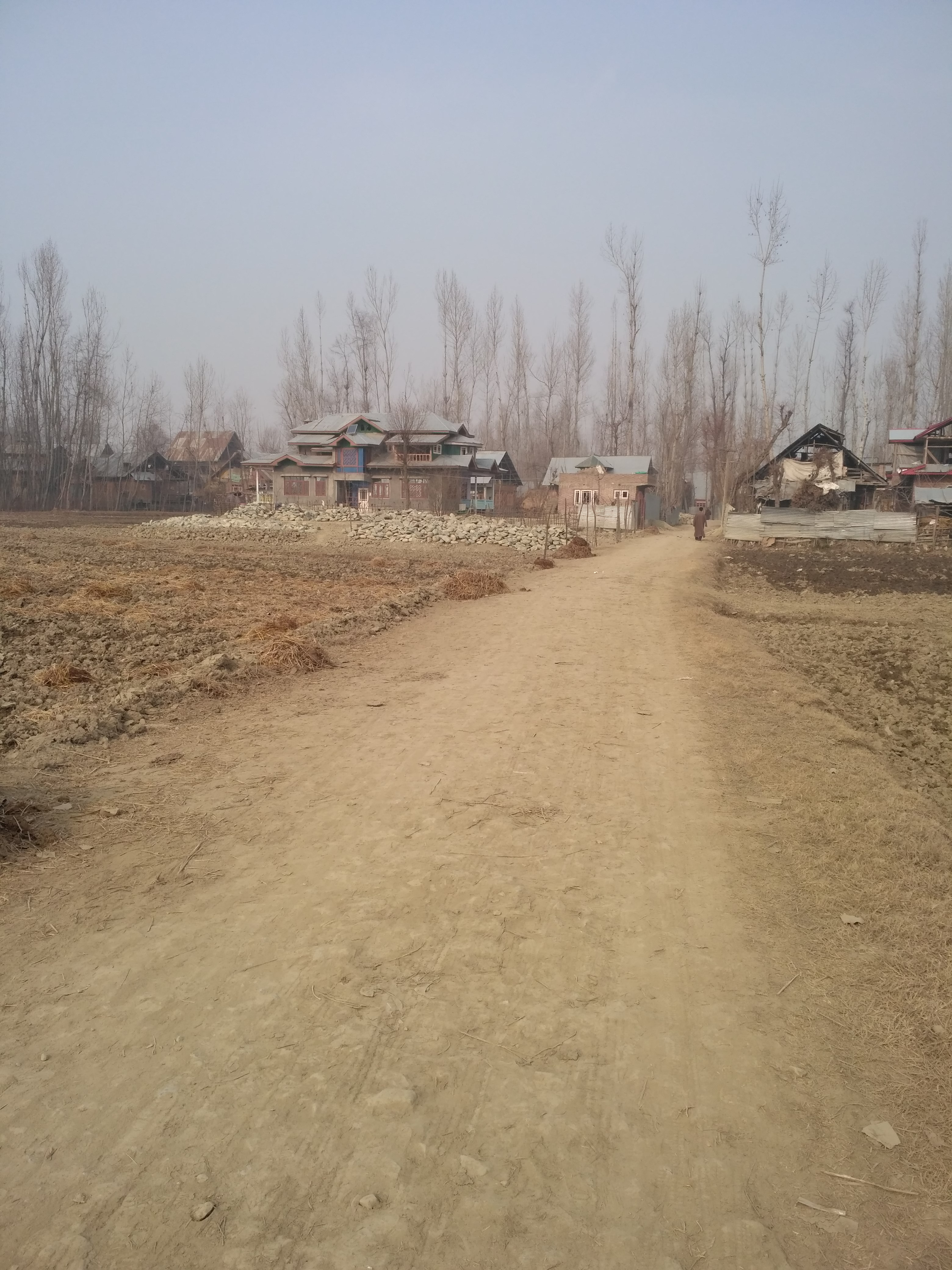
View Purni Suder Shah from Mazhom railway station

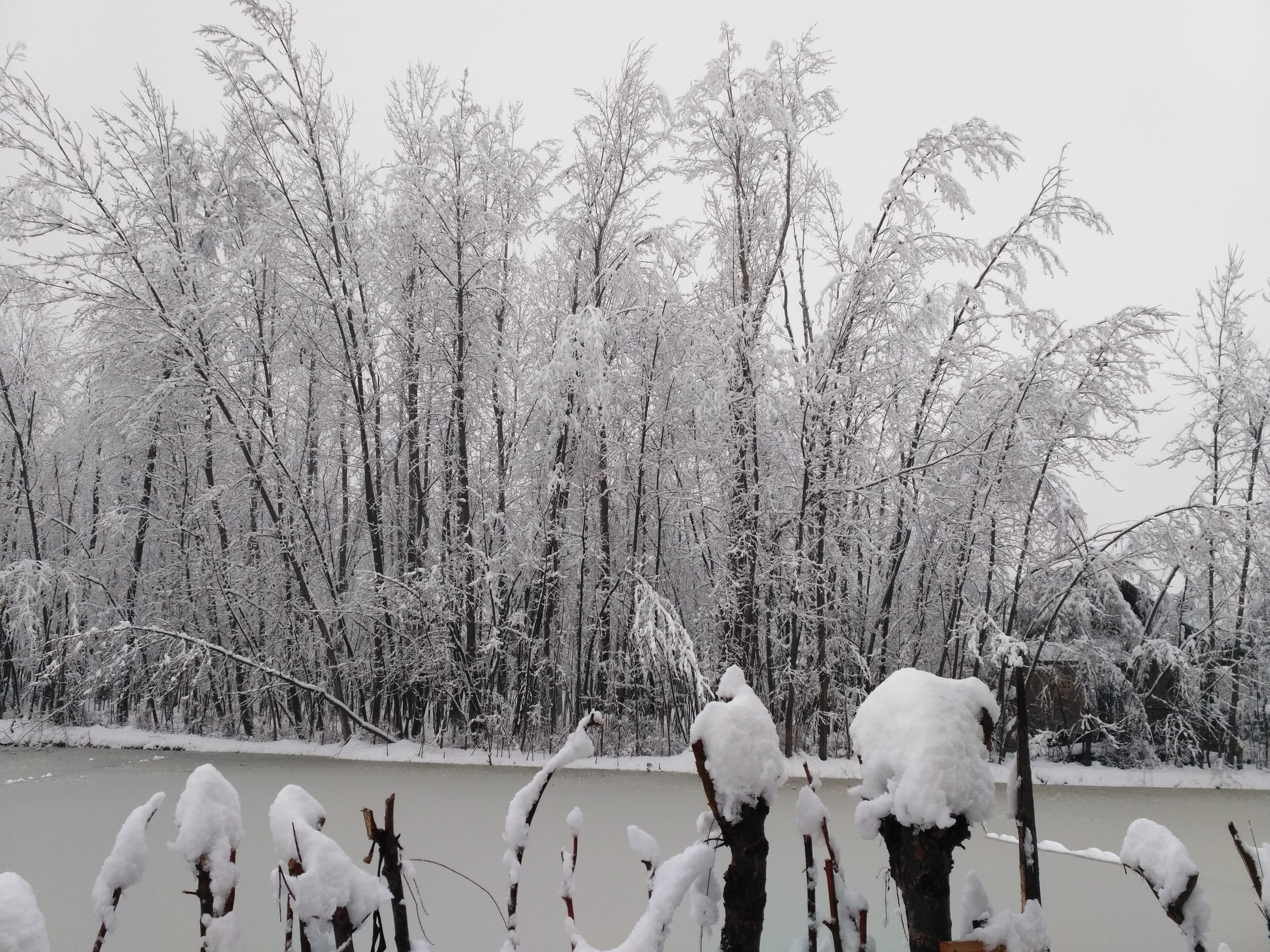
Snow Fall in Purni Suder Shah

== History ==
The village of Purn was first settled around the year 1800 AD by Abdul Ahad Mir (son of the late Abdul Habib Mir), whose ancestors hailed from the nearby village of Kanihama. Today, Purn is home to approximately 45-50 households. Historically, the village was connected to other parts of the district by a single road leading to Archanderhama. However, in 2023, a new metal road under the Pradhan Mantri Gram Sadak Yojana (PMGSY) was completed, enhancing connectivity. This new road now links the village directly to Mazhom Railway Station and provides access to the Narbal-Gulmarg Road, significantly improving transportation and access to neighboring regions. Archaeological evidence suggests that the area was inhabited in ancient times. During excavations for farming purposes, various artifacts, such as terracotta vessels, have been discovered, indicating the presence of early settlers. It is believed that these ancient inhabitants might have abandoned the area due to its vulnerability to floods or, alternatively, might have been displaced or wiped out by a catastrophic event. The village Purni Suder Shah is named after Suder Shah, a Sufi saint who is believed to have lived in the area and is buried in a local graveyard. The name "Purn" derives from the Kashmiri word “purn”, which means "dwelling place," reflecting its historical role as a settlement.

== Geography ==
Purni Suder Shah, also known as Pati-Purni Suder Shah, is a small village located in the Kawoosa Jagir area of Tehsil Narbal in the Budgam district of Jammu and Kashmir, India. The village is situated approximately 2.5 kilometers from the Kanihama-Gulmarg road and about half a kilometer from Mazhom railway station. Historically, Purni Suder Shah was not directly connected to the railway station or the main district; instead, it was linked to the surrounding areas through a road passing via Archanderhama, which lies in the neighboring baramulla district. In 2023, the completion of a new metal road under the Pradhan Mantri Gram Sadak Yojana (PMGSY) significantly improved connectivity. The road now directly links Purni Suder Shah to Mazhom railway station and provides a direct route to the Budgam district.

Geographically, the village is positioned at 34.11°N latitude and 74.620°E longitude, with an average elevation of 1,569 meters (5,147 feet) above sea level.

Nearby landmarks include Mazhom railway station, Kanihama (famous for its Kani shawls), Magam (a busy marketplace), Archanderhama, and Habak.

== Education ==
Purni Suder Shah has only one primary school and its building is owned by Masjid committee.

== Transport ==
Purni Suder Shah is not yet connected with the State and District Highway roads neither it is connected to railway station. Mazhom railway station is located 1–2 km (0.62–1.24 mi) from Purni Suder Shah. The postal code of the village is 193401.Postal Code: PURNI SUDER SHAH, Post Kanihama BO (Baramulla, Jammu and Kashmir)
