= Mazhom =

Mazhama Mazhom
- Village
- Location in Jammu and Kashmir, India Mazhama (India)
- Coordinates: 34°06′N 74°37′E
- Country: India
- Union territory: Jammu and Kashmir
- District: Budgam

Languages
  - Official: Kashmiri, Urdu, Hindi, Dogri, English
- Time zone: UTC+5:30 (IST)
- PIN: 193401

Mazhom (also known as Mazhama) is a village located in Budgam district of the union territory of Jammu and Kashmir, India. It has a railway station, Mazhom railway station, which, along with being in proximity (3 km) to Magam, the biggest financial hub of the district, plays a crucial role in transportation and communication in the area. There is also a railway flyover on Gulmarg Road. The surrounding villages are Kawoosa Khalisa (east) and Kanihama (west). Mazhama is located on both sides of the Gulmarg Highway. Schools in the village include Hanfia English Medium School, Government Middle School, and another local educational institution. A well-facilitated Primary Health Centre is also present in the village. Mazhama has a power receiving station and is home to the Sufi saint Sona Ullah Bhat, popularly known as Son Bab. The village is also home to three masjids. River Sukhnag, a tributary of the Jhelum, flows along the boundary of the village.
