= Peth Zanigam, Jammu and Kashmir =

Village in Jammu and Kashmir, India

Peth Zanigam Zeani Gam
- Village
- Path Zani Gam
- Country: India
- Union territory: Jammu and Kashmir
- District: Budgam
- Tehsil: Beerwah
- Established: Not known
- Founded by: Not known

Government
  - Type: Panchayat House Zanigam
  - Body: Panchayat samiti

Area
  - Total: 286 ha (710 acres)
- Elevation: 1,111 m (3,645 ft)

Population (2011)
  - Total: 975
  - Density: 341/km^{2} (883/sq mi)
- Demonym: English : Zanigami Urdu: Kashmiri:

Languages
  - Official: Kashmiri, Urdu, Hindi, English
- Time zone: UTC+5:30 (IST)
- PIN: 193411
- Vehicle registration: JK04
- Religion: Islam
- Sex Ratio: 490 ♀/ 485 ♂
- Ethnicity: Kashmiris

Peth Zanigam is a village in Budgam district in Indian Jammu and Kashmir. It is situated at the base of the Pir Panjal Range of the Himalayas, in the Sukhnag Valley. It falls under the administrative division of tehsil Beerwah, which is one of the nine tehsils of district Budgam. It lies at a distance of about 30 kilometres (19 mi) from the district headquarters Budgam, 7 kilometres (4.3 mi) from the tehsil headquarters Beerwah, and 40 kilometres (25 mi) away from Srinagar, the summer capital of Jammu and Kashmir.

According to Census 2011, Path Zani Gam's population is 975. Out of this, 485 are males while the females count 490 here. This village has 220 kids in the age bracket of 0–6 years. Out of this 102 are boys and 118 are girls.
