= Zoonipora =

Village in Jammu and Kashmir, India

- village
- Location in Jammu and Kashmir, India Zoonipora (India)
- Coordinates: 33.968867°N 74.839486°E
- Country: India
- Union Territory: Jammu and Kashmir
- District: Budgam
- Elevation: 1,585 m (5,200 ft)

Population (2011)
  - Total: 471

Languages
  - Official: Kashmiri, Urdu, Hindi, Dogri, English
- Time zone: UTC+5:30 (IST)
- PIN: 191113
- Telephone code: 0194
- Vehicle registration: JK04
- Sex ratio: 987♀/1000♂ (2011)
- Literacy: 60.41% (2011)
- Website: budgam.nic.in

Zoonipora is a medium size village in the locality of Dooniwari, located in BAGAT KANIPORA (B.K.POORA) Tehsil of Budgam district, Jammu and Kashmir with total 57 families residing. The Zooni Pora village has population of 471 of which 237 are males and 234 are females as per Population Census 2011.

== Demographics ==
In Zoonipora village population of children aged 0–6 is 107, which makes up 13.56% of the total population of the village. The average sex ratio of Zoonipora village is 943, which is higher than the Jammu and Kashmir state average of 889. As per the census, the child sex ratio for the Zooni Pora is 1,098; this is also higher than the Jammu and Kashmir average of 862.

== Education ==
Zoonipora village has a lower literacy rate compared to Jammu and Kashmir. In 2011, the literacy rate of Zooni Pora village was 60.26% compared to 67.16% of Jammu and Kashmir. In Zoonipora, the male literacy rate stands at 69.01% while female literacy rate is 50.76%.

== See also ==
- Dooniwari
- Srinagar
- Bagati Kani Pora
