= Chattergam =

Village in Jammu and Kashmir, India

- Village
- Location in Jammu and Kashmir, India Chattergam (India)
- Coordinates: 33.987°N 74.839°E
- Country: India
- Union territory: Jammu and Kashmir
- District: Budgam
- Tehsil: B.K. Pora
- Founder: not known.

Government
  - Type: Panchayat

Languages
  - Official: Kashmiri, Urdu, Kashmiri
- Time zone: UTC+5:30 (IST)
- PIN: 191113
- Vehicle registration: JK04

Chattergam is an Upper Town in B.K Pora Block of district Budgam of the Jammu and Kashmir. It is 9.8 km away from the Srinagar and 18 km from the district Budgam. Postal Head Office of Chattergam is Chadoora and its pincode is 191113.

== Demographics ==
As per the census of 2011, its total population was 3548, of which males are 1667 and 1881 are females.

== See also ==
- Srinagar
- Dooniwari
- Bagati Kani Pora
