= Chadoora Assembly constituency =

Constituency of the Jammu and Kashmir Legislative Assembly

Coordinates: 33.945°N 74.799°E

Chadoora
- Constituency No. 31 for the Jammu and Kashmir Legislative Assembly

Constituency details
- Country: India
- State: Jammu and Kashmir
- District: Budgam
- Lok Sabha constituency: Srinagar
- Established: 1967

Member of Legislative Assembly
- Incumbent Ali Mohammad Dar
- Party: Jammu and Kashmir National Conference
- Elected year: 2024

Chadoora Assembly constituency is one of the 90 constituencies in the Jammu and Kashmir Legislative Assembly of Jammu and Kashmir a north state of India. Chadoora is also part of Srinagar Lok Sabha constituency. Branwar is one of the famous tourist destination of chadoora

== Members of the Legislative Assembly ==
Election	Member	Party
1967	Mir Mustafa	Indian National Congress
1972	Mir Mustafa	Indian National Congress
1977	Abdul Samad Mir	Jammu and Kashmir National Conference
1983	Abdul Samad Mir	Jammu and Kashmir National Conference
1987	Mir Mustafa	Independent
1996	Ali Mohammad Dar	Jammu & Kashmir National Conference
2002	Javaid Mustafa Mir	Jammu and Kashmir Peoples Democratic Party
2008	Javaid Mustafa Mir	Jammu and Kashmir Peoples Democratic Party
2014	Javaid Mustafa Mir	Jammu and Kashmir Peoples Democratic Party
2024	Ali Mohammad Dar	Jammu & Kashmir National Conference

== Election results ==
=== Assembly Election 2024 ===
2024 Jammu and Kashmir Legislative Assembly election : Chadoora
Party	Candidate	Votes	%	±%
JKNC	Ali Mohammad Dar	31,991	63.57%	New
JKPDP	Mohmad Yaseen Bhat	14,773	29.36%	▼18.90
Independent	Faisal Fayaz	942	1.87%	New
JKAP	Syed Fahed Andrabi	716	1.42%	New
Independent	Nilofar Sajjad Gandru	452	0.90%	New
NOTA	None of the Above	1,265	2.51%	▲1.53
Margin of victory		17,218	34.22%	▲31.05
Turnout		50,321	56.76%	▼6.65
Registered electors		88,659		▲5.27
JKNC gain from JKPDP		Swing	▲15.32	

=== Assembly Election 2014 ===
2014 Jammu and Kashmir Legislative Assembly election : Chadoora
Party	Candidate	Votes	%	±%
JKPDP	Javaid Mustafa Mir	25,770	48.26%	▲6.89
JKNC	Ali Mohammad Dar	24,077	45.09%	▲11.19
Independent	Ghulam Mohammed Bhat	1,261	2.36%	New
Independent	Bilal Ahmad Mir	665	1.25%	New
INC	Mohammad Maqbool Malla	384	0.72%	▼5.67
NCP	Ghulam Mohammed Paul	376	0.70%	New
JKNPP	Riyaz Ahmad Rather	344	0.64%	New
NOTA	None of the Above	526	0.98%	New
Margin of victory		1,693	3.17%	▼4.30
Turnout		53,403	63.41%	▲9.63
Registered electors		84,218		▲15.10
JKPDP hold		Swing	▲6.89	

=== Assembly Election 2008 ===
2008 Jammu and Kashmir Legislative Assembly election : Chadoora
Party	Candidate	Votes	%	±%
JKPDP	Javaid Mustafa Mir	16,278	41.36%	▼16.67
JKNC	Ali Mohammad Dar	13,338	33.89%	▲5.19
LJP	Bashir Ahmad Matoo	3,066	7.79%	New
INC	Ghulam Nabi Mir	2,515	6.39%	▲2.59
JKPDF	Ghulam Nabi Ganie	849	2.16%	New
Independent	Ghulam Mohammed Hajam	578	1.47%	New
JKANC	Bashir Ahmad Mir	563	1.43%	New
Margin of victory		2,940	7.47%	▼21.86
Turnout		39,354	53.79%	▲1.34
Registered electors		73,169		▲39.86
JKPDP hold		Swing	▼16.67	

=== Assembly Election 2002 ===
2002 Jammu and Kashmir Legislative Assembly election : Chadoora
Party	Candidate	Votes	%	±%
JKPDP	Javaid Mustafa Mir	15,923	58.03%	New
JKNC	Ali Mohammad Dar	7,876	28.70%	▼16.08
Independent	Ghulam Mohammed Hajam	1,050	3.83%	New
INC	Abdul Rashid Ganai	1,043	3.80%	▼20.66
Independent	Mushtaq Shamim	673	2.45%	New
Independent	Syed Abdul Rashid	475	1.73%	New
Independent	Syed Ashiq Hussain	221	0.81%	New
Margin of victory		8,047	29.33%	▲9.01
Turnout		27,439	52.45%	▼6.13
Registered electors		52,315		▲22.20
JKPDP gain from JKNC		Swing	▲13.25	

=== Assembly Election 1996 ===
1996 Jammu and Kashmir Legislative Assembly election : Chadoora
Party	Candidate	Votes	%	±%
JKNC	Ali Mohammad Dar	11,230	44.78%	▲8.61
INC	Ghulam Nabi Mir	6,134	24.46%	New
JD	Farooq Ahmad	4,656	18.57%	New
BSP	Ghulam Hussain Wani	2,529	10.08%	New
BJP	Mohammed Abdullah Dar	528	2.11%	New
Margin of victory		5,096	20.32%	▲15.90
Turnout		25,077	61.69%	▼12.34
Registered electors		42,812		▼4.62
JKNC gain from Independent		Swing	▲4.20	

=== Assembly Election 1987 ===
1987 Jammu and Kashmir Legislative Assembly election : Chadoora
Party	Candidate	Votes	%	±%
Independent	Mir Mustafa	12,920	40.59%	New
JKNC	Abdul Samad Mir	11,514	36.17%	▼17.64
Independent	Mohammed Ismail	6,347	19.94%	New
JKNPP	Noor U Din	300	0.94%	New
Independent	Qadir Gujree	245	0.77%	New
Margin of victory		1,406	4.42%	▼26.72
Turnout		31,833	72.97%	▲3.12
Registered electors		44,886		▲20.29
Independent gain from JKNC		Swing	▼13.23	

=== Assembly Election 1983 ===
1983 Jammu and Kashmir Legislative Assembly election : Chadoora
Party	Candidate	Votes	%	±%
JKNC	Abdul Samad Mir	13,614	53.81%	▼11.04
Independent	Mir Mustafa	5,736	22.67%	New
INC	Ghulam Mohammad Mir	4,574	18.08%	▼5.18
JI	Mohammad Ismail	871	3.44%	▲0.88
JKNC	Peeerzada Abdul Rashid	322	1.27%	▼63.58
Independent	Ghulam Nabi Bhat	182	0.72%	New
Margin of victory		7,878	31.14%	▼10.46
Turnout		25,299	72.48%	▼1.14
Registered electors		37,314		▲27.33
JKNC hold		Swing	▼11.04	

=== Assembly Election 1977 ===
1977 Jammu and Kashmir Legislative Assembly election : Chadoora
Party	Candidate	Votes	%	±%
JKNC	Abdul Samad Mir	13,103	64.86%	New
INC	Mir Mustafa	4,699	23.26%	▼65.17
JP	Syed Farooq Anderabi	1,389	6.88%	New
JI	Mohammed Ismail	518	2.56%	New
Independent	Ghulam Ahamd Bhat	494	2.45%	New
Margin of victory		8,404	41.60%	▼39.24
Turnout		20,203	77.67%	▼17.69
Registered electors		29,306		▲8.06
JKNC gain from INC		Swing	▼23.57	

=== Assembly Election 1972 ===
1972 Jammu and Kashmir Legislative Assembly election : Chadoora
Party	Candidate	Votes	%	±%
INC	Mir Mustafa	20,774	88.43%	▲21.48
Independent	Samad Dar	1,783	7.59%	New
Independent	Pear Abdul Rashid Bulbul	935	3.98%	New
Margin of victory		18,991	80.84%	▲46.93
Turnout		23,492	87.57%	▲30.74
Registered electors		27,119		▲12.12
INC hold		Swing		

=== Assembly Election 1967 ===
1967 Jammu and Kashmir Legislative Assembly election : Chadoora
Party	Candidate	Votes	%	±%
INC	Mir Mustafa	9,050	66.95%	New
JKNC	A. R. Magrey	4,467	33.05%	New
Margin of victory		4,583	33.91%	
Turnout		13,517	57.31%	
Registered electors		24,188		
INC win (new seat)				

== See also ==
- Chadoora
- List of constituencies of Jammu and Kashmir Legislative Assembly
