= Guda Sathu, Budgam =

Village in Jammu and Kashmir, India

Guda Sathu
- Location within Jammu and Kashmir Location within India
- Coordinates: 33.971772°N 74.770371°E
- Country: India
- Union territory: Jammu and Kashmir
- District: Budgam

Area
  - Total: 1.404 km^{2} (0.542 sq mi)

Population (2011)
  - Total: 1,988
  - Density: 1,416/km^{2} (3,667/sq mi)

Languages
  - Official: Kashmiri, Urdu, Hindi, Dogri, English
- Time zone: UTC+5:30 (IST)

Guda Sathu is a village in the Budgam district in the Indian Union Territory of Jammu and Kashmir.

== Demographics ==
As of 2011, the total population of Guda Sathu is 1,988 of which 1,012 are males and 976 are females. Total number of households in the village is 301. Population of children with the age group 0-6 is 269 of which 150 are males and the remaining 119 are females. Literacy rate of the village is 54.74% lower than the former state average of 67.16%. In Guda Sathu, total number of literates are 1,088 of which 647 are males and 441 are females.

== See also ==
- Ichgam
- Chadoora
