= Sechin Banet =

Village in Jammu and Kashmir

Sechin Banet Shitsan Bonyut / شِژن بونیوٚٹ
- Village
- Country: India
- Union territory: Jammu and Kashmir
- District: Budgam
- Tehsil: Beerwah
- Founder: not known.

Government
  - Type: Panchayat

Languages
  - Official: Kashmiri, Urdu, Hindi, Dogri, English
- Time zone: UTC+5:30 (IST)
- PIN: 193401
- Vehicle registration: JK04

Sechin Banet or Shitsan Bonyut is a village (near Otligam village) in tehsil Beerwah of district Budgam of the Jammu and Kashmir.
