= Hanji-Bough =

Village in Indian-administered Jammu and Kashmir

Hanji-Bough or Heanz-Bough is a village in Magam tehsil of district Budgam in Indian-administered Jammu and Kashmir in the disputed Kashmir region, 10 km from the sub-district headquarter Beerwah and 25 km from the district headquarter Budgam. As of 2009, Peth Kanihama is the gram panchayat of Hanji-Bough village.

The total area of the village is 59.9 hectares, and the total population is 1,105, out of which 592 are males and 513 are females. The village of Hanji-Bough has about 122 houses. Hanji-Bough is a 10-minute walk from Magam town. The village is located on the right bank of a river known as Nallah-e-Sukhnag (which originates from Tosemaidan). Sukhnag River is one of the major left bank tributaries of River Jhelum. The village is divided into two wards, and is under Halqa Pethkanihama.
