= Gotapora =

Village in Jammu and Kashmir, India

Gotapora Gotapor
- Village
- Location in Jammu and Kashmir, India Gotapora (India)
- Coordinates: 34.087°N 74.680°E
- Country: India
- Union Territory: Jammu and Kashmir
- District: Budgam

Area
  - Total: 164.7 ha (407 acres)

Population (2011)
  - Total: 2,875
  - Density: 1,746/km^{2} (4,521/sq mi)

Languages
  - Official: Kashmiri, Urdu, Hindi, Dogri, English
- Time zone: UTC+5:30

Gotapora or Gotapor village is located in Budgam Tehsil of Budgam district in the Indian-administered union territory of Jammu and Kashmir. It is situated 12.5 km (7.8 mi) from the summer capital of Jammu and Kashmir, Srinagar. As per 2009 stats, Gotapora is the gram panchayat of Gotapora village

== Geography ==
The total geographical area of village is 164.7 hectares. It is located at 34.087°N 74.680°E, at an elevation of 1,587 metres.

== Demography ==
As of 2011, the population of Gotapora is 2875 of which 1509 are males while remaining 1366 are females. There are about 388 houses in Gotapora village. Gotapora village has lower literacy rate compared to Jammu and Kashmir. In 2011, literacy rate of Gotapora village was 59.22% compared to 67.16% of Jammu and Kashmir. In Gotapora Male literacy stands at 65.92% while female literacy rate was 52.10%.
