= Sukhnag River =

River in Jammu and Kashmir

Sukhnag River. سۄکھٕ ناگ آرٕ
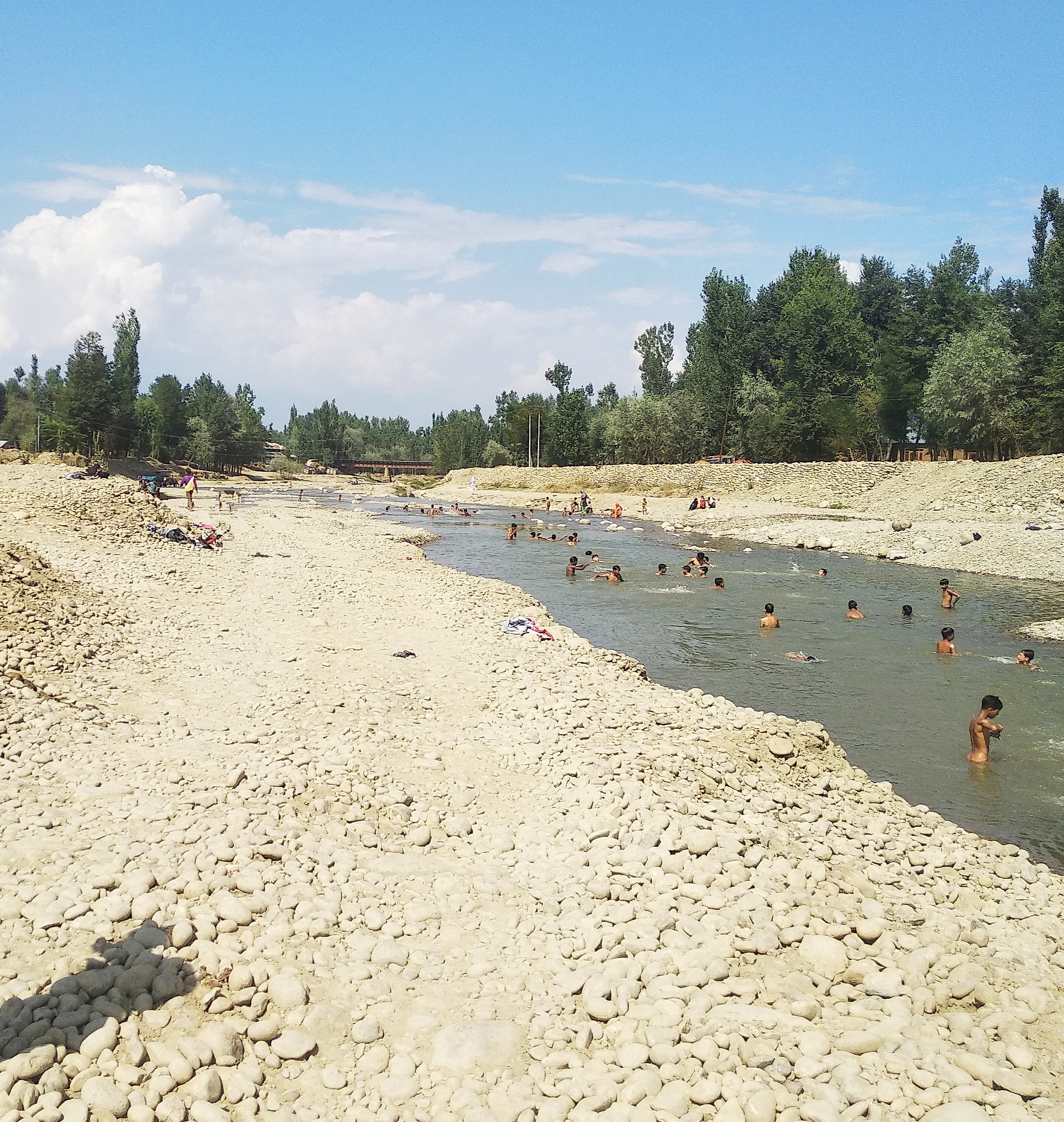
- Etymology: Kashmiri سۄکھ: Means Calm, Means Spring ;ناگ Means River; آرِ
- Native name: Sukhnag (Kashmiri)

Location
- Country: India
- State: Jammu and Kashmir
- Region: Kashmir Valley
- District: Budgam

Physical characteristics
- Source: Ashtar Spring And ShinMahnew Glacier
  - location: Tosamaidan
- Mouth: Jhelum River
- Length: 54 km (34 mi)
- Basin size: 400 Km

Basin features
- River system: Indus River System
- Landmarks: Sukhnaag River Valley
- Cities: Beerwah
- Tributaries
  - left: Dam Dam Kol, Dammam Sar Kol, Badshah Nag Kol

The Sukhnag River (Koshur:سۄکھٕ ناگ آرٕ)is one of the major tributaries of the River Jhelum located in Budgam District in the Kashmir Valley in the union territory of Jammu and Kashmir, India. It originates in the Tosa Maidan locale of Pir Panjal Range and has a length of 54 km (34 mi).

== Origin ==
There are several streams originating at the top of the Tosa Maidan locale, all of which join to form the Sukhnag river. Ahij canal and Lar canal originate from Sukhnag river which irrigate various areas of district Budgam. The river passes through Arizal, [[Peth Zanigam, KanigundJammu and Kashmir|Peth Zanigam]], Buna Zanigam, Sail, Beerwah, Rathsun, Pethmakhama, Hanji-Bough, Mazhama, Kawoosa, Narbal, Daslipora, Palhalan Ghat, Nowgam Jheel villages.
