= Doodhpathri =

Hill Station in Jammu and Kashmir, India

- Hill Station
- DoodhPathri Development Authority
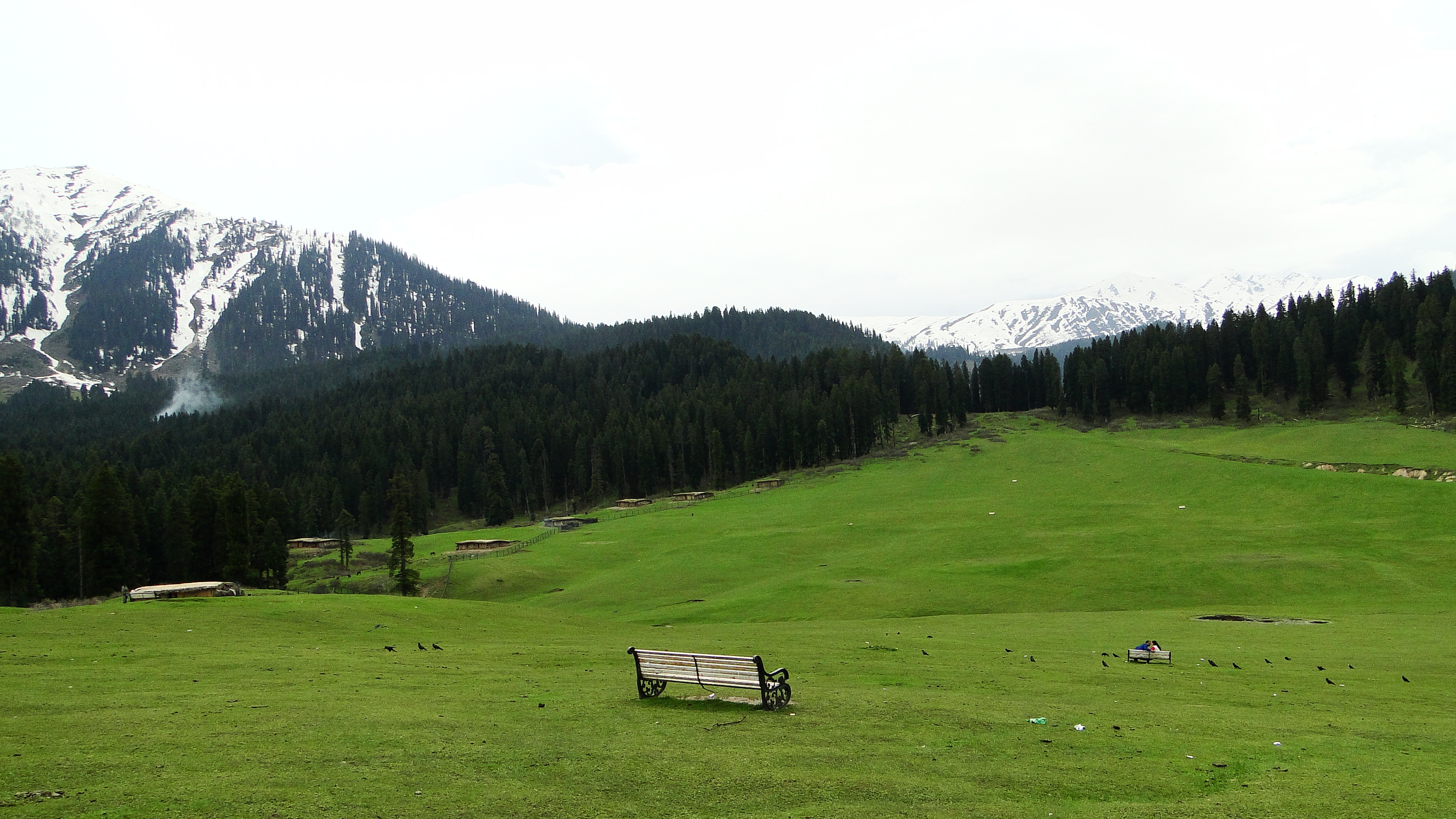
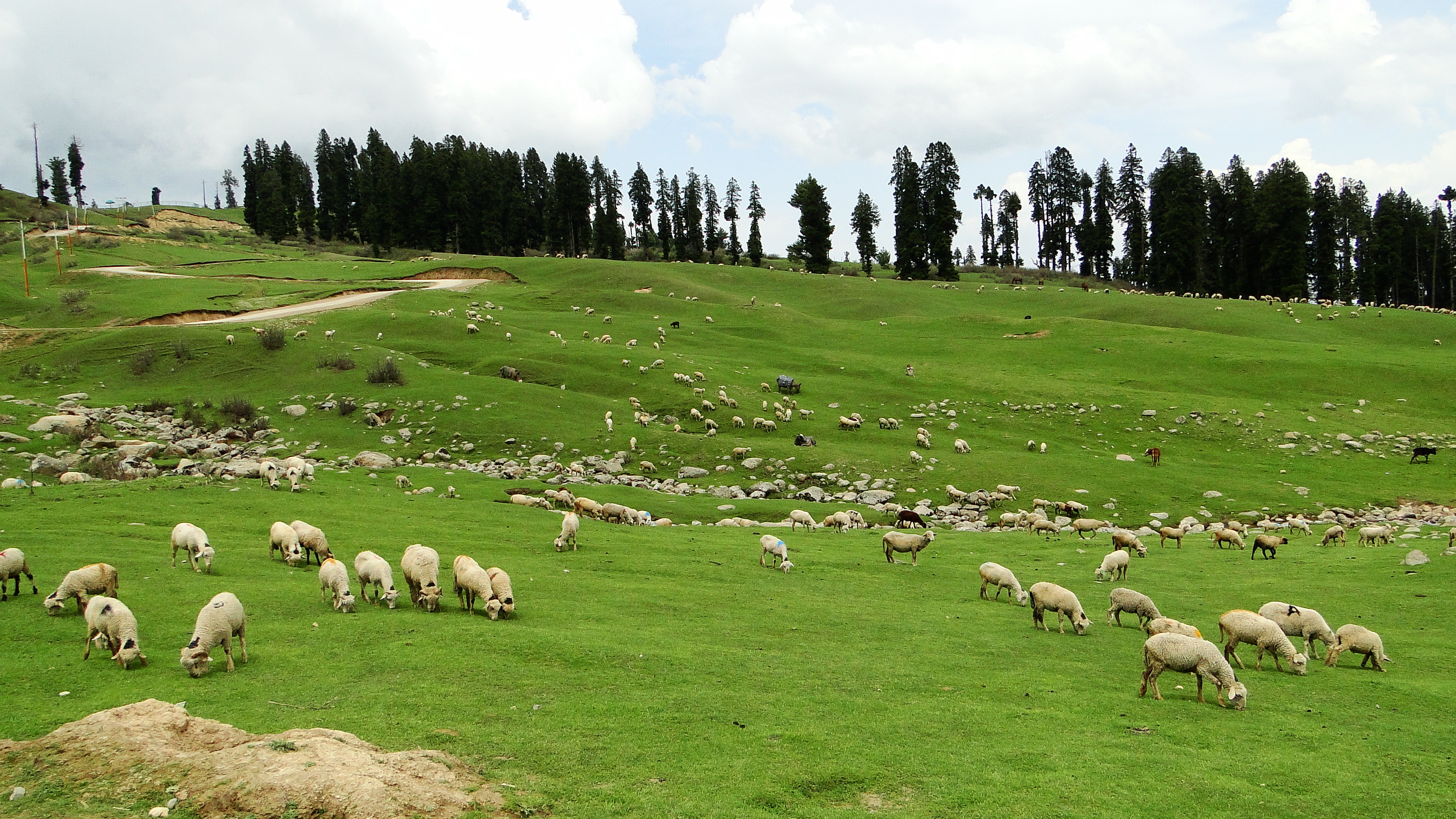
- Nature, scenery of Doodhpathri
- Nickname: Valley Of Milk
- Motto: We Serve, We Invite You To Visit Us
- Location in Jammu & Kashmir, India Doodhpathri (India)
- Coordinates: 33.85°N 74.56°E
- Country: India
- Region: Jammu and Kashmir
- District: Budgam
- Named for: White Appearance Of Water

Government
  - Body: Doodhpathri Development Authority
- Elevation: 2,730 m (8,960 ft)

Languages
  - Official: Kashmiri, Urdu, Hindi, Dogri, English

Languages
  - Local: Kashmiri, Gujari, Pahadi
- Time zone: UTC+5:30 (IST)
- Pin Code: 191111
- Vehicle registration: JK04

Doodhpathri (transl. Valley of Milk; Urdu pronunciation: [d̪uːd̪ʱ pət̪ʰɾiː]; Kashmiri pronunciation: [dɔdɨ patʰɨr]) is a tourist destination and a hill station located in the Khansahib tehsil of the Budgam district of Jammu and Kashmir, India. Situated at an altitude of 2,730 metres (8,960 ft) from sea level, it is located at a distance of 42 km (26 mi) from Jammu and Kashmir's summer capital, Srinagar, and 30 km (19 mi) from its district headquarters, Budgam.

== History and Etymology ==
The name "Doodhpathri" means "Valley of Milk." It is said that the famous poet and saint of Kashmir, "Sheikh-Ul-Aalam" Sheikh-Noor-Ud-Din Noorani, has prayed here, and once, when he was in search of water in the meadows to offer prayers, he pricked the ground with his stick to search for water, and milk came out. He told the milk that it could only be used for drinking and not for ablution. Hearing this, milk at once changed its state to water, and the meadow got its name "Doodhpathri". The water that is currently flowing through the meadows has a milky appearance from a distance and remains very cold throughout the year. The lush green grasses over the vast meadows and silver-shining streams running over the large stones further increase its beauty. Doodhpathri is a sloping grassy landscape with a diversity of multicolored flowers up to Chang. The famous Tosamaidan lies to the west of Doodhpathri.

== Geography ==
Doodhpathri lies in a bowl shaped valley in the Pir Panjal Range of the Himalayas, at an altitude of 2,730 metres (8,960 ft) above sea level. It is an alpine valley covered with snow-clad mountains and meadows of pine, fir and deodar. The natural meadows, which are covered with snow in winter, allow the growth of wild flowers such as daisies, forget-me-nots, and buttercups during spring and summer.

== Demographics ==
Doodhpathri does not have any permanent settlements, and during the winter months, it is inaccessible due to the severe snowfall. Shepherds from the plains of the district of Budgam send their cattle to Doodhpathri in the summer for grazing, and they tend to stay there seasonally for approximately six months.

== Access ==
Doodhpathri is easily accessible from Srinagar, in under 2–3 hours by car or bus. The routes of Doodhpathri are from Srinagar to Budgam, Budgam to Ichgam, Ichgam to Khansahib, and Khansahib to Doodhpathri via Raiyar. The total distance is about 42 km (26 mi).

Doodhpathri is easily accessible from Srinagar in under 2 hours by car or taxi. The routes to Doodhpathri are from Srinagar to Budgam, Budgam to Khansahib, and Khansahib to Doodhpathri via Raiyar, a total distance of about 45 km (28 mi). Another route is from Srinagar to Gulmarg Road; the route starts from Srinagar to Magam, Magam to Beerwah, and Beerwah to Doodhpathri via Zaingam and Arizal, a total distance of about 50 km (31 mi).

The nearest airport is the Sheikh ul-Alam International Airport (Srinagar, Jammu and Kashmir). Doodhpathri is at a distance of 40 km (25 mi) from this airport and it takes about 1 hour by car.

== Places around Doodhpathri ==
The main attractions of Doodhpathri are Tangnar, Mujpather, Dophkhal, Sochilpather, Palmaidan, and Parihas.

- Tangnarٹنٚگٕہ نار: (Lit; Gorge Of Pears) This place comes on the way 2 km (1.2 mi) before Doodhpathri. It is a beautiful place of small valleys with deodar and pine trees on small hills.
- Mujpathriمُجِہ پَتھٕر: Mujpathri (translation: Valley of Turnip) is a small hamlet 3 km (1.9 mi) from Doodhpathri, it is situated on the bank of river Shaliganga.
- Palmaidanپَلۂ مآٔدآن: Palmaidan (translation: Big stones ground) is named after the "Big Stones" because there are huge stones all around the ground. It is situated at a distance of about 5 km (3.1 mi) from Doodhpathri and is the favourite spot of shepherds and cowboys where they gather in large numbers in summer and graze their cattle and livestock. It is a beautiful place with a small stream running on one side of the ground. The place is rich in deodar and pine trees.
- Diskhal ڈِسکُھل: Dikshal is a beautiful meadow on the top of the mountain and overlooks the Ashtaar glacier. It is around 10 km (6.2 mi) trek from Shaliganga Nallah in Doodhpathri.
