= Government Degree College, Beerwah =

College in Jammu and Kashmir, India

- The Principal, The Dean, The Scholars And The Students Of College At Beerwah
- Latin: imperium collegium Beerwah
- Motto: "O my Lord! Open for me my chest (grant me self-confidence, contentment, and boldness); & Ease my task for me"
- Type: College
- Established: 2005 (21 years ago)
- Academic affiliations: University of Kashmir
- Vice-Chancellor: Prof. Khurshid Iqbal Andrabi
- Principal: Prof Zahoor Ahmed Shah Almadani
- Location: Beerwah, Budgam, Jammu and Kashmir, India
- Campus: Rural
- Language: Kashmiri Urdu, English
- Colours
- Website: www.gdcbeerwah.edu.in

The Government Degree College, Beerwah, also known as GDC Beerwah, is a University Grants Commission autonomous coeducational degree college in the Indian union territory of Jammu and Kashmir, located on 60 Kanal campus in Beerwah 30 kilometres (19 mi) from Srinagar. The college is affiliated with the University of Kashmir.

== Establishment ==
The Government of Jammu and Kashmir established the college under the Chief-Ministership of Mufti Mohammad Sayeed with the hard work and efforts initiated by Sarfaraz Ahmad Khan, the then Member of Legislative Assembly (MLA) of Beerwah.

Initially the college started its functioning in a few rooms in DIET (District Institute of Education and Trainings ) Beerwah with only few subjects (General English, Computer Applications, Applied Mathematics, Urdu and Education) to offer to its students.

The present Campus of college where it is functioning since May 2010, is located on a hill under the lap of nature with a picturesque view on the right side of Beerwah-Kangripora road, overlooking the town.

The college is affiliated with the University of Kashmir since its inception in 2005 and has received permanent affiliation status with effect from 2010. The University Grants Commission, New Delhi vide its communication No. F.No.8-246/2007 (CPP-I/C) dated 30 August 2010 has included the college in its list of colleges under section 2(f) and 12(B) of the UGC Act, 1956. The college has started receiving grants from the UGC under various developmental schemes of academic and infrastructural nature. The college gone through a NAAC Peer Team visit on 17, 18 June 2019 and Accredited with B Grade with 2.05 CGPA Points.

== Courses ==
The college offers undergraduate degree courses in Arts, Science and Commerce streams.

=== Bachelor courses ===
- Bachelors in Arts
- Bachelors in Science (Medical)
- Bachelors in Science (Non-Medical)
- Bachelors in Computer Applications (BCA)
- Bachelors in Commerce
- B.Sc. Water Management (yet to start)

=== Masters Courses ===
- Study Center Maulana Azad National Urdu University MANUU
- Study Centre Indira Gandhi National Open University (IGNOU) New Delhi
