= Iskander Pora, Jammu and Kashmir =

Village in Jammu and Kashmir, India

Iskander Pora اِسکَندَر پور/Iskander por
- Village
- Nicknames: اسگندر پور; Isgander pur
- Location in Jammu and Kashmir Iskander Pora (India)
- Coordinates: 34°1′37″N 74°34′10″E
- Country: India
- Union territory: Jammu and Kashmir
- District: Budgam
- Elevation: 1,748 m (5,735 ft)

Population (2011)
  - Total: 3,301

Languages
  - Official: Kashmiri, Urdu, Hindi, Dogri, English
- Time zone: UTC+5:30 (IST)
- PIN: 193411
- Area code: +91-1954-xxxxxx

Iskander Pora is a village in the district Budgam, tehsil Beerwah in the union territory of Jammu and Kashmir, India. It is located about 29 km (18 mi) west of the district headquarters, Budgam, and about 34 km (21 mi) west of the summer capital of Srinagar.

The village is predominantly inhabited by members of the Shia community, although individuals of other religious faiths also reside there in peaceful coexistence.

== Demographics ==
In the 2011 census Iskander Pora had a population of 3,301, 1,733 males and 1568 females. The village had a sex ratio of 905 females for every 1,000 males.

Demography
Sex	Percent
Male ♂	52.50%
Female ♀	47.50%
Male and female population

Religions
Religion	Percent
Shia Muslims	95%
Sunni Muslims	05%
Distribution of population on religion

== Geography ==
Iskander Pora is located at 34.0264°N 74.5694°E. It has an average elevation of 1,748 m (5,735 ft). It is situated at plateau-like land mass, it is surrounded by karewas on south, west and north with its east surrounded by plains.

Iskander Pora is connected with the Srinagar city via Magam town and Budgam district headquarters, Budgam, via Beerwah town. It is 10 km (6.2 mi) away from Magam and 2.5 km (1.6 mi) away from Beerwah. It is also connected to tehsil Khag via Malpora which is also 10 km (6.2 mi) distant.

Mazhom Railway Station is the nearby railway stations to Magam for a person arriving from north or south.

== Education ==
=== Schools ===
- Government Middle School, Iskander Pora (est. 1962)
- Imamia Public High School, Iskander Pora

=== Religious education ===
Religious education is imparted in local maktabs. These impart education on a part-time basis to the children. •Maktabs names

1. Maktab-e-Islamia run by Al-Abbas Relief trust.

2. Babul Ilm run by Hauziya Babul Ilm, Budgam.

3. Maktab e Imamia affiliated to Tanzeem ul Makatib.
