= Narawarah =

Village in Jammu and Kashmir

Narawarah Narewoar
- Village
- Location in Jammu and Kashmir, India Narawarah (India)
- Coordinates: 33.991447°N 74.615210°E
- Country: India
- Union territory: Jammu and Kashmir
- District: Budgam
- Tehsil۔ Beerwah: Beerwah
- Founder: not known.

Government
  - Type: Panchayat

Languages
  - Official: Kashmiri, Urdu, Hindi, Dogri, English
- Time zone: UTC+5:30 (IST)
- PIN: 193401
- Vehicle registration: JK04

Narwara Beerwah or Narewoar is a village in tehsil Beerwah of district Budgam of the Jammu and Kashmir.

== Educational institutions ==
- Govt۔middle school narwara
- Govt primary school narwara
- Darul۔uloom Simnaniya ۔۔۔
- Institutions ibn ussymein narwara
