= Narbal =

Town in Jammu and Kashmir

Narbal The Gateway of Gulmarg
- Tehsil
- Nickname: Narabal
- Location in Jammu and Kashmir, India Narbal (India)
- Coordinates: 34.118699920162875°N 74.67277804169375°E
- Country: India
- Union territory: Jammu and Kashmir
- District: Budgam

Government
  - Type: State Government
  - Body: Government of Jammu and Kashmir

Area
  - Total: 33 km^{2} (13 sq mi)
- Elevation: 1,572 m (5,157 ft)

Population (2011)
  - Total: 41,059
  - Density: 1,245/km^{2} (3,220/sq mi)
- Demonym: Narbali

Languages
  - Official: Kashmiri, Urdu, English
- Time zone: UTC+5:30 (IST)
- PIN: 193401
- Telephone code: 1951
- Vehicle registration: JK04

Narbal is a tehsil, block and a town in central Kashmir's Budgam district in Jammu and Kashmir. It is known as the "Gateway of Gulmarg," as it is the first town on the road of the hill station Gulmarg. Narbal is located 13 km (8.1 mi) from Srinagar, the summer capital of Jammu and Kashmir.

== Geography ==
As per government records, the block number of Narbal is 14. The block has 51 villages and there are a total of 11,343 homes in this block.. It is also tehsil since 2014. It is located 14 km (8.7 mi) west of Srinagar's City Centre Lalchowk and 14 km (8.7 mi) North of district headquarter Budgam. It is surrounded by Beerwah and Magam tehsils towards the south-west and west, Pattan tehsil towards the North and Srinagar's Shalteng towards the East. Srinagar, Magam and Budgam are the nearby cities or towns. River Sukhnag, which originates in Tosamaidan, passes through the town and is the major source of water in the area. There is a Sufi Ziyarat of Syed Mohammad Soliah Bukhari R.A near Narbal Main Stop. Narbal is known for the beautiful playground where people from adjacent areas are seen playing cricket, football, and other sports.

== Access ==
Mazhom railway station is the nearby railway station located six kilometres from Narbal. Srinagar International Airport is located around 16 km (9.9 mi) from here.As it is located on Srinagar-Gulmarg Highway, Narbal is well connected via road to the summer capital Srinagar, It is also connected via bus service run by Srinagar Smart City Ltd.

== Economy ==
The count of employed people of Narbal block is 24,513, yet 62,953 are un-employed. And out of 24,513 employed people, 3,871 persons are fully reliant on farming. Although a vast majority of population is involved with agricultural activities (rice and vegetable farming) in one way or other, it is not the major source of income in Narbal. People obtain livelihood either from government jobs, daily skilled as well as unskilled labour activities etc. Private sector jobs are rare.

== Housing colonies ==
Mohalla Moulvi Sahib is a housing colony in Narbal. It is named after an Islamic scholar Syed Amir ud din known as Moulvi Sahib in district Budgam. It is located on the left side of Narbal Gulmarg Road.

Other colonies include Syed Mohalla, Arifeen Colony Sector 1, 2, and 3, New Colony, and Alamdaar Colony.
