= Chak Dewan Lakhimandass =

Chak Dewan Lakhimandass چکہٕ دیون لکھمنداس
- Village
- Country: India
- Union territory: Jammu and Kashmir
- District: Budgam
- Tehsil: Beerwah
- Founder: not known.

Government
  - Type: Panchayat

Languages
  - Official: Kashmiri, Urdu, Hindi, Dogri, English
- Time zone: UTC+5:30 (IST)
- PIN: 193401
- Vehicle registration: JK04

Chak Dewan Lakhimandass is a village in the tehsil Beerwah of the district Budgam of the Jammu and Kashmir in India.
