= Kawoosa Khalisa =

Kawoosa Khalisa is a village in the Narbal Block of Budgam district in the Indian union territory of Jammu and Kashmir. It is 16 km west of Budgam and 10 km from the state capital, Srinagar. Located on Srinagar-Gulmarg Highway. Kawoosa Khalisa is bordered to the west by Breng Block, to the north by Wakura Block, to the east by Pattan Block, and to the south by Badgam Block.

== Demographics ==
The primary languages are Kashmiri and Urdu.

== Education ==
Nearby colleges include Govt. Degree College Magam, Govt. Degree College Bemina, and Govt. Degree College Beerwah.

There are two public schools:

1. Hanfia Anglo Arabic Modern Public School Kawoosa Khalisa.
2. Sheikh Ul Aalam Public Model High School Kawoosa Khalisa.

There are two government schools:

1. Govt. Boys High School
2. Govt. Girls Middle School

A football sports club namely Kawoosa Khalisa football club has been running from 2018 with the approval of local village administration with proper documentation to curb youth from getting involved in illicit activities. In 2025 two players from the same village played national level games in MP.
