= Choon, Budgam =

Choon
- Village
- Location within Jammu and Kashmir Location within India
- Coordinates: 33.986952°N 74.732002°E
- Country: India
- Union territory: Jammu and Kashmir
- District: Budgam

Area
  - Total: 226.60 ha (559.9 acres)

Population (2011)
  - Total: 2,861
  - Density: 1,263/km^{2} (3,270/sq mi)

Languages
  - Official: Kashmiri, Urdu, Hindi, Dogri, English

Choon is a village in the Budgam district in the Indian-administered union territory of Jammu and Kashmir.

== Demographics ==
As of 2011, the total population of Choon is 2,819 of which 1541 are males and 1278 are females. Total number of households in the village is 289. Population of the children with age group 0-6 is 651 of which 351 are males and the remaining 300 are females. Literacy rate of the village is 58.79%, lower than the former state average of 67.16%. In Choon, total number of literates are 1580 of which 980 are males and 600 are females. 5G Internet connectivity and wired with Fibres of telecom companies. Horticulture is the predominant sector of the economy of this Area, Along with Horticulture the people has their own businesses, Construction Companies, Hotel and associated with other forms of employment. The village has Hospital, PowerGrid Station and Animal Husbandry as well, Choon is first Carbon free Village of J&K, The village consists of some prominent figures of Valley, The village holds place to Two shrines, Syed Yaqoob Kirmani(R.a) and the shrine of Shah Gufoor (R.a), the village has beautiful scenic place known as Drathan Bagh and public Eidgah Park.
