= Ich Kot, Budgam =

Village in Jammu and Kashmir, India

Ich Kot Ichkoot
- Village
- Location within Jammu and Kashmir Location within India
- Coordinates: 33.977454°N 74.743918°E
- Country: India
- Union territory: Jammu and Kashmir
- District: Budgam

Area
  - Total: 253.70 ha (626.9 acres)

Population (2011)
  - Total: 2,082
  - Density: 820.7/km^{2} (2,125/sq mi)

Languages
  - Official: Kashmiri, Urdu, Hindi, Dogri, English

Ich Kot or Ichkoot is a village in the Budgam district in the Indian-administered union territory of Jammu and Kashmir.

== Demographics ==
As of 2011, the total population of Ich Kot is 2,082 of which 1,052 are males and 1,030 are females. Total number of households in the village is 425. Population of children with the age group 0-6 is 238 of which 126 are males and the remaining 123 are females. Literacy rate of the village is 54.41%, lower than the former state average of 67.16%. In Ich Kot, total number of literates are 1,133 of which 684 are males and 449 are females.
