= Dadina =

Dadina Dadun
- Village
- Location in Budgam, Jammu and Kashmir Dadina (India)
- Coordinates: 34°03′25″N 74°39′36″E
- Country: India
- State: Jammu and Kashmir
- District: Budgam
- Elevation: 1,460 m (4,790 ft)

Population (2019)
  - Total: 5,000

Languages
  - Official: Kashmiri, Urdu, Hindi, Dogri, English
- Time zone: UTC+5:30 (IST)
- PIN: 191111

Dadina or Dadun is a village of Budgam district situated in Budgam block in Jammu and Kashmir, India. It is only 4 km (2.5 mi) from the district headquarters. It is the most neighbouring vicinity to Budgam.

The population of Dadina is about 5,000 in which 3,000 are males and 2,000 are females. Literacy rate of the village is about 60%. The villages are engaged with agriculture, business and jobs.
