= Jawalpora, Budgam =

Village in Jammu and Kashmir, India

Jawalpora Jawal Pora Jawalpur
- Village
- Location within Jammu and Kashmir Location within India
- Coordinates: 33.9902°N 74.6811°E
- Country: India
- Union territory: Jammu and Kashmir
- District: Budgam

Area
  - Total: 324.20 ha (801.1 acres)

Population (2011)
  - Total: 1,940
  - Density: 598/km^{2} (1,550/sq mi)

Languages
  - Official: Kashmiri, Urdu, Hindi, Dogri, English
- Time zone: UTC+5:30 (IST)

Jawalpora, also known as Jawalpur, is a village in the Budgam district in the Indian-administered union territory of Jammu and Kashmir. It falls under the administrative division of block Budgam.

== Demographics ==
As of 2011, the total population Jawalpora is 1,940 of which 1,021 are males and 919 are females. Total number of households in the village is 311. Population of children with the age group 0-6 is 241 of which 120 are males and the remaining 121 are females. Literacy rate of the village is 52.26%, lower than the former state average of 67.16%. In Jawalpora, total number of literates are 1,014 of which 670 are males and 344 are females.
