= Khag, Jammu and Kashmir =

Khag Khag
- Tehsil
- Khag
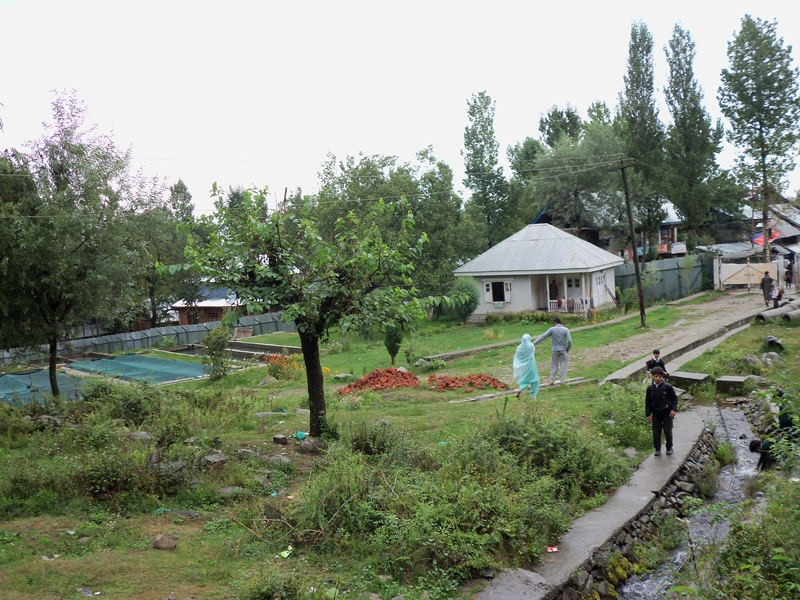
- Naranag Fishery Khag

- Location in Jammu and Kashmir, India Khag (India)
- Coordinates: 33.9642591°N 74.508242°E
- Country: India
- Union Territory: Jammu and Kashmir
- District: Budgam
- Tehsil Incorporated: 2006

Government
  - Type: Democratic

Population (2011)
  - Total: 6,663

Languages
  - Official: Kashmiri, Urdu, Hindi, Dogri, English
- Time zone: UTC+5:30 (IST)
- Postal Index Number: 193411
- Area code: 01951
- Vehicle registration: JKO4

Khag is a tehsil in and block in the Beerwah sub-district of the Budgam district in the Indian union territory of Jammu and Kashmir. It is 8.8 km (5.5 mi) away from sub-district headquarter Beerwah and 35 km (22 mi) away from Srinagar.

Before 2008, Khag was one of the blocks of Beerwah tehsil. After the government of Jammu and Kashmir created new administrative units in 2008, Khag was granted tehsil status.

== Geography ==
Khag is between 2,438 m (8,000 ft) and 4,267 m (14,000 ft) above sea level. It is located at the base of the Pir Panjal mountain range, surrounded by mountains of up to 5,181 m (17,000 ft). The area is covered with dense shrubbery and has many villages, including Nowrooz Baba, Sugen Yarinar, Shunglipora, Poshker, Khanpora, Lassipora, Iskander Pora, Drung, Malpora, and Nagbal.

== Tosa Maidan ==
The Tosa Maidan pasture is surrounded by dense forests of deodars and pinus, about 15 km (9.3 mi) from Khag in the Himalayas. The area is frequently used by local shepherds and the Gujjar community. Tosa Maida was leased to the Indian Army in 1964 for 50 years. After the army lease expired in April 2014, it was opened to the public by the government of Jammu and Kashmir.

== Education ==
Schools in the area include both government-run and private schools of varying levels. Khag is one of the educational zones of Budgam district, and has a Zonal Education Officer overseeing its education department.
