= Khan Sahib, Jammu and Kashmir =

Khan Sahib Khan Seab
- Town
- Location in Jammu and Kashmir, India Khan Sahib (India)
- Coordinates: 33.956341°N 74.665253°E
- Country: India
- Union Territory: Jammu and Kashmir
- District: Budgam

Population (2011)
  - Total: 13,698
  - Rank: 8th
  - Density: 32/km^{2} (83/sq mi)

Languages
  - Official: Kashmiri, Urdu, Hindi, Dogri, English
- Time zone: UTC+5:30 (IST)
- Vehicle registration: JK04

Khan Sahib or Khan Seab is a town sub-district and a notified area committee in Budgam district in the central Kashmir, union territory of Jammu and Kashmir, India. In 2008, Government Degree College, Khansahib was established in the town to cater to the needs of rural population.

== Demographics ==
Khan Sahib Tehsil had a population of 123,312 as of 2011 India census. Female Sex Ratio is of 920 against state average of 889. With 26% of the population being under 6 years of age, the child Sex Ratio in Khansahib is around 882 compared to Jammu and Kashmir state average of 920.

Demographics (Census 2011)
	Total	Male	Female
Population	123,312	64,227	59,085
Literacy	50.8%%	45.2%	29.3%
Children of age 0-6	32,070	17,037	15,033
Schedule Caste	2	2	0
Schedule Tribe	11,232	5,733	5,499
Main Workers	16,030	14,135	1,895
Marginal Workers	12,453	8,334	4,129
Non Working	94,819	41,758	53,061

== Municipal committee ==
Municipal Committee Khansahib is a local body which administrates the town of Khansahib in Budgam district, Jammu and Kashmir, India. It has 7 elected members. Its last elections took place on 8 October 2018.

Keys: Independent (7)

#	Name	Municipal Ward	Reservation Status	Party
1	Parveen Akhter	Shah Mohalla	Women Open	Independent
2	Bashir Ahmed Nazar	Malpora	Open	Independent
3	Tanvir Gul	Syed Soliyah Colony	Open	Independent
4	Ateeqa	Astan Mohalla	Women Open	Independent
5	Mohd. Iqbal Shah	Mukdam Mohalla	Open	Independent
6	Fayad Ahmed Shah	Iqbal Colony	Open	Independent
7	Irfan Ah. Khan	Umer Colony	Open	Independent
