= Javaid Mustafa Mir =

Indian politician

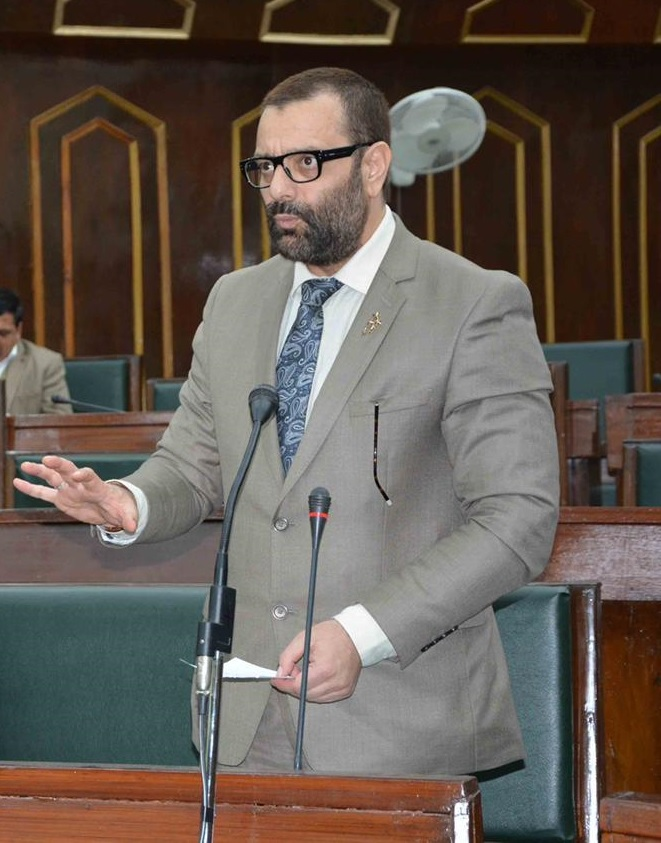
- Javaid Mustafa Mir at Jammu and Kashmir Legislative Assembly in 2017

Minister for Disaster Management & Relief Rehabilitation and Floriculture Government of Jammu and Kashmir
- In office 2017–2018

Minister for Revenue Government of Jammu and Kashmir
- In office 2015–2016

Member of Jammu and Kashmir Legislative Assembly
- In office 2014–2018
- Constituency: Chadoora (Vidhan Sabha constituency)
- In office 2008–2014
- In office 2002–2008

Minister of State for Rural Development Department, Panchayati Raj, Science & Technology and Information Technology Govt Of Jammu & Kashmir
- In office 2007–2008

Minister of State for Power Development Department Govt Of Jammu & Kashmir
- In office 2003–2006

Personal details
- Born: 24 December 1969 (age 56) Jammu and Kashmir (state)
- Party: Jammu and Kashmir Apni Party
- Spouse: Rehana Javaid
- Children: 2 (2 Sons)& 1 daughter
- Parent(s): Mir Mustafa (father), Aisha Begum (mother)
- Education: B.A

Javaid Mustafa Mir (born 24 December 1969) is an Indian politician and a former minister of the erstwhile state of Jammu and Kashmir. He was elected to the Jammu and Kashmir Legislative Assembly in 2002, 2008 and 2014 from Chadoora. Presently, he is the Vice President of Jammu and Kashmir Apni Party.

== Personal life ==
Javaid Mustafa Mir was born in a political family in 1967. His father, Mir Mustafa was elected as MLA from Chadoora (Vidhan Sabha constituency) twice in 1987 and 1990. He was abducted and assassinated by the militants after which Javaid started handling his family business until 2002 when his political journey began.

== Political career ==
Javaid Mustafa Mir started his political career in 2002, twelve years after his father's assassination. His father's supporters encouraged Javaid to fight the 2002 Jammu and Kashmir Legislative Assembly election. He joined Jammu and Kashmir Peoples Democratic Party (PDP) who fielded Javaid from Chadoora (Vidhan Sabha constituency). He contested and won from Chadoora (Vidhan Sabha constituency) with a huge margin.

After winning the 2002 Assembly elections, he was inducted as the Minister of State for Power Development Department up to 2005. In 2007, he became the Minister of State for Rural Development Department, Panchayati Raj, Science & Technology and Information Technology.

In 2008 the government under the Chief Minister Ghulam Nabi Azad collapsed and in 2008 Jammu and Kashmir Legislative Assembly election, Mir was elected 2nd time MLA from Chadoora (Vidhan Sabha constituency).

Javaid again contested the 2014 Jammu and Kashmir Legislative Assembly election and emerged as a winner for the third term consecutively from Chadoora (Vidhan Sabha constituency). After winning the elections, he was inducted into the PDP-BJP cabinet led by then Chief Minister of Jammu and Kashmir Mufti Mohammad Sayeed and in 2015, became Minister for Revenue, a position that he maintained until January 2016 when the Chief Minister passed away and the government collapsed.

In 2017 he was again inducted into the cabinet as the Minister for Disaster Management & Relief Rehabilitation and Floriculture and was in office until 2018 when the government collapsed after the coalition was disbanded.

Javaid left the People's Democratic Party (PDP) in January 2019.

== Positions held ==
#	From	To	Position	Comments
01	2002	2008	Member of the Legislative Assembly (India) (Chadoora (Vidhan Sabha constituency))	elected
02	2003	2006	Minister of State for Power Development Department	
03	2007	2008	Minister of State for Rural Development Department, Panchayati Raj, Science & Technology and Information Technology	
04	2008	2014	Member of the Legislative Assembly (India) (Chadoora (Vidhan Sabha constituency)) 2nd time	re-elected
05	2014	2018	Member of the Legislative Assembly (India) (Chadoora (Vidhan Sabha constituency)) 3rd time	re-elected
06	2015	2016	Minister for Revenue	
07	2017	2018	Minister for Disaster Management & Relief Rehabilitation and Floriculture	
