= Mir Mustafa =

Indian politician

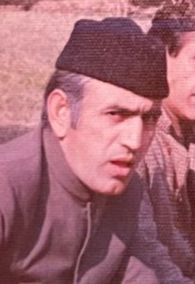

Member of Jammu and Kashmir Legislative Assembly
- In office 1972–1977
- Constituency: Chadoora
- In office 1987–1990
- Constituency: Chadoora

Personal details
- Died: March 1990
- Other political affiliations: Indian National Congress (1972)
- Spouse: Aisha Begum
- Children: Javaid Mustafa Mir

Ghulam Mustafa Mir was an Indian Politician and a member of the Jammu and Kashmir Legislative Assembly. He served twice as Member of the Legislative Assembly from Chadoora (Vidhan Sabha constituency) first in 1972 from the Indian National Congress and then in 1987 as an Independent Politician. Mir was abducted and assassinated by militants in March 1990.

== Political career ==
Mir joined the Indian National Congress in 1960 and fought elections from the party in 1972 in which he achieved victory with an impressive lead of 18961 votes and 20774 margin in total. He was considered a close ally but he left congress and later fought the 1987 assembly elections as an independent candidate where he again emerged victorious.

== Assassination ==
In March 1990, Mir left his house but was abducted on his way by militants, who demanded the release of eight militants. Negotiations however didn't go well and he was killed. Two days later, his body was found near Batamaloo and the accused gunmen were later killed in an encounter.
