= Otligam =

Village in Jammu and Kashmir

Otligam Otlegam (اُٹلہٕ گام)
- Village
- Country: India
- Union territory: Jammu and Kashmir
- District: Budgam
- Tehsil: Beerwah
- Founder: not known.

Government
  - Type: Panchayat

Languages
  - Official: Kashmiri, Urdu, Hindi, English
- Time zone: UTC+5:30 (IST)
- PIN: 193411
- Vehicle registration: JK04

Otligam or Otlegam is a village in tehsil Beerwah of district Budgam of the Jammu and Kashmir. Village plays an important role with respect to education, banking facilities as well as the road connectivity of adjoining villages. Besides this the village has a Primary Health Centre set by Ministry of Ayush.

== Educational Institutions ==
- Govt. HS School Otligam.
- Govt. Secondary School Otligam.
- Govt. Middle School Otligam.
- Cambridge School of Modern Education

== Transport ==
The district road (Budgam To Beerwah) passes through the otligam village, and its nearest airport is the Sheikh ul-Alam International Airport.

== Bank and Post Office ==
Otligam village has a bank of the Jammu & Kashmir Bank. IFSC of Jammu & Kashmir Bank branch Otligam is JAKA0OTLIGA. And has a Post Office, which have a code is 193411.
