= Nagbal =

Village in District Ganderbal

Nagbal is a village in Ganderbal district of Indian union territory of Jammu and Kashmir. The village lies in Ganderbal block of the district and is one of the nearest villages to Srinagar city. Rangil water treatment plant is situated in the same area which provides water supply to majority of city population.
