= Dooniwari =

Village in Jammu and Kashmir, India

Dooniwari Dooniwara
- Village
- Location in Jammu and Kashmir, India Dooniwari (India)
- Coordinates: 33.972091°N 74.831686°E
- Country: India
- Union Territory: Jammu and Kashmir
- District: Budgam

Area
  - Total: 1.68 km^{2} (0.65 sq mi)
- Elevation: 1,585 m (5,200 ft)

Population (2011)
  - Total: 1,839
  - Density: 1,090/km^{2} (2,840/sq mi)

Languages
  - Official: Kashmiri, Urdu, Hindi, Dogri, English
- Time zone: UTC+5:30 (IST)
- PIN: 191113
- Telephone code: 0194
- Vehicle registration: JK04
- Sex ratio: 914♀/1000♂ (2011)
- Literacy: 59.56% (2011)
- Website: budgam.nic.in

Dooniwari (Urdu pronunciation: [ɖuːniːʋɑːɾiː] ; Kashmiri pronunciation: [ɖuːnʲʋoːr]) or Dooniwara (Urdu pronunciation: [ɖuːniːʋɑːɾɑː]) is a village in Budgam district of the Indian union territory of Jammu and Kashmir, situated 13 km (8.1 mi) from Srinagar city and 18 km (11 mi) away from Budgam town. The total geographical area of the village is 168 ha (420 acres). Dooniwari has a total population of 1,839 residents. There are about 278 houses in Dooniwari village as per the 2011 census. Areas in its locality include Wathoora, Gopalpora, Chattergam, Kralapora, and Bagati Kani Pora.

== Dooniwari Data ==
Dooniwari Data
Particulars	Total	Male	Female
Total no. of houses	278	-	-
Population	1,839	961	878
Child (0-6)	301	178	123
Schedule caste	0	0	0
Schedule tribe	0	0	0
Literacy	59.56%	72.03%	46.62%
Total Workers	601	442	159
Main Workers	349	-	-
Marginal Workers	252	110	142

== Caste Factor ==
There is no population of Schedule Caste (SC) and Schedule Tribe(ST) in Dooniwari village of Badgam district.

== Work Profile ==
In Dooniwari, out of total population, 601 were engaged in work activities. 58.07% of workers describe their work as Main Work (Employment or Earning more than 6 Months) while 41.93% were involved in Marginal activity providing livelihood for less than 6 months. Of 601 workers engaged in Main Work, 118 were cultivators (owner or co-owner) while 4 were Agricultural labourer.

== Transport ==
=== Rail ===
The nearest railway station to Dooniwari is Srinagar railway station, located at a distance of 8 km (5.0 mi) in Nowgam.

=== Airports ===
The nearest airport is Srinagar International Airport, located at a distance of 13 km (8.1 mi).

== Demographics ==
As per the Population Census 2011, Dooniwari village has a population of 1839 citizens, of which 961 are males while 878 are females. In Dooniwari, the population of children aged 0–6 is 301, which makes up 16.37% of the total population of the village. The Average Sex Ratio of Dooniwari is 914 females per 1,000 males, which is higher than the Jammu and Kashmir UT average of 889 females per 1000 males. Child Sex Ratio for the Dooniwari as per the census is 691, lower than the Jammu and Kashmir average of 862.

Population
Females	47.74%
Males	52.25%
Percentage of Males & Females out of Total Population

== Education ==
Dooniwari has a lower literacy rate compared to Jammu and Kashmir. In 2011, the literacy rate of Dooniwari village was 59.56% compared to 67.16% of Jammu and Kashmir. In Dooniwari Male literacy rate stands at 72.03% while the Female literacy rate is 46.62%.

Literacy rate (Total) in Dooniwari
1. Educated Citizens (59.6%)
2. Non-Educated Citizens (40.4%)
Literacy rate of Females in Dooniwari
1. Educated Females (46.6%)
2. Non-Educated Females (53.4%)
Literacy rate of Males in Dooniwari
1. Educated Males (72.0%)
2. Non-Educated Males (28.0%)

== See also ==
- Srinagar
- Bagati Kani Pora
- Zoonipora
