= Soibugh =

Village in Jammu and Kashmir, India

- Town
- Location in Jammu and Kashmir, India Soibugh (India)
- Coordinates: 34.0760°N 74.7052°E
- Country: India
- Union Territory: Jammu and Kashmir
- District: Budgam

Area
  - Total: 6.04 km^{2} (2.33 sq mi)

Population (2011)
  - Total: 25,267
  - Density: 4,180/km^{2} (10,800/sq mi)

Languages
  - Official: Kashmiri, Urdu, Hindi, Dogri, English
- Time zone: UTC+5:30 (IST)
- Area code: 000624

Soibugh is a town in Budgam district in the Indian-administered union territory of Jammu and Kashmir. It is 8.5 km (5.3 mi) from the summer capital of Jammu and Kashmir, Srinagar. It is one of the highly populated area of district Budgam. Soibugh is one of the 17 blocks of Budgam district.

Since the village Soibugh is functioning as Naib Tehsil in Tehsil Budgam of District Budgam since long however, it was upgraded to Tehsil in 2014 by the National Conference Govt after a protest was erupted when the new administrative units were declared by the Revenue Deparyment govt of JK in the month of July 2014.

Soon after the Flash floods of September 2014 in Kashmir Division new administrative units were directed to resume work without approving any new staff however, Soibugh Tehsil was not made functional. A degree college is under construction and shall function from academic year 2026-27. A proposed new Sub District Hospital will soon be constructed at Parimpora Soibugh Road.

== Geography ==
Total geographical area of Soibugh is 604.20 ha (6.0420 km^{2}). It is located at 34.0760°N 74.7052°E, at an elevation of 1,587 metres. Soibugh is located 8.5 km (5.3 mi) from Srinagar, the summer capital of union territory of Jammu and Kashmir.

== Demography ==
As of 2011, the population of Soibugh is 9,873 of which 5,066 are males while the remaining 4,807 are females as per the report released by census of India. Population of the children with age 0-6 is 1,539. Total number of households in this village is 1,471. The location code of Soibugh is 000624. The number of literates are 4,095 in which 2,391 are males and 1,704 are females.

== See also ==
- Budgam
- Ichgam
