= Chadoora =

Chadoora Tsodur
- Town in Budgam
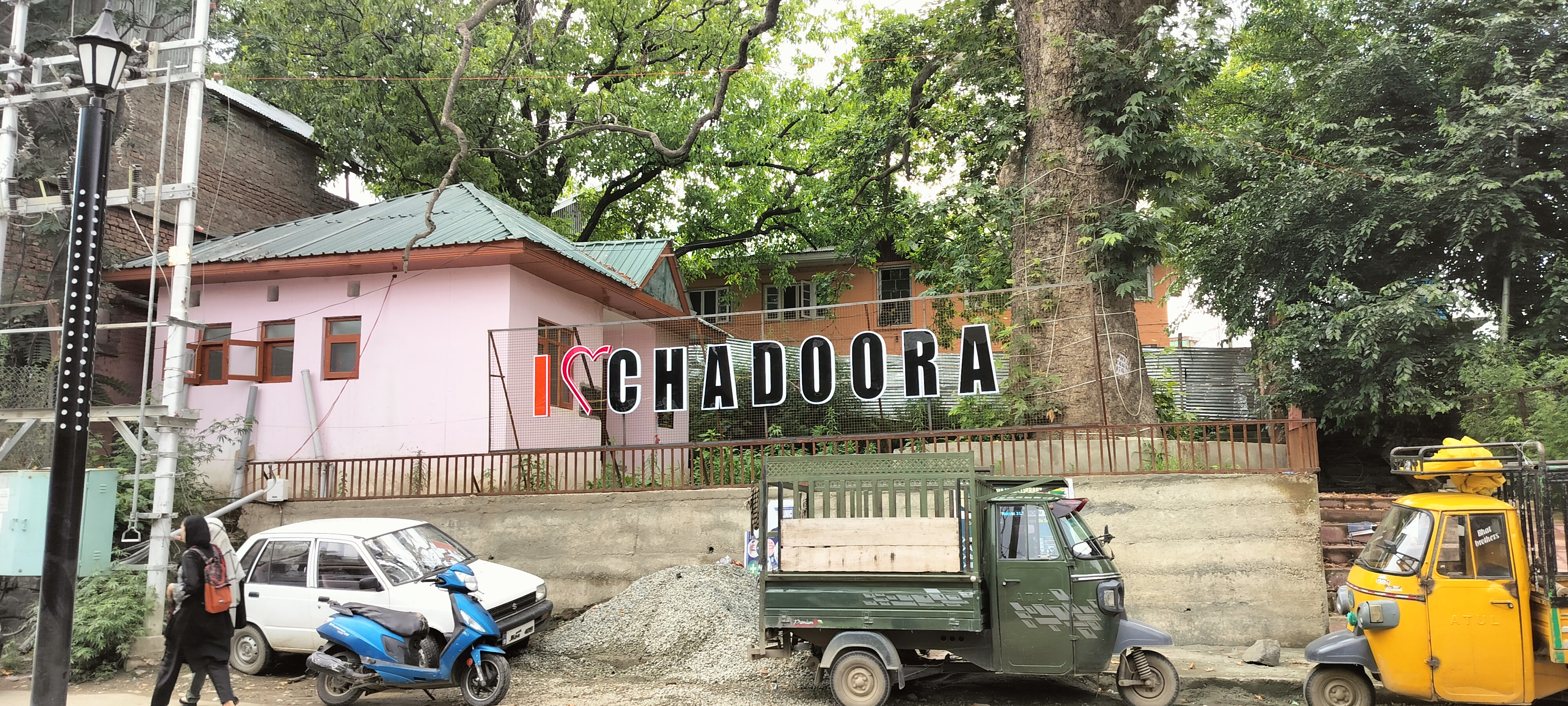
- Typography installed in main market, Chadoora saying "I ♥️ Chadoora"

- Location in Jammu and Kashmir, India Chadoora (India)
- Coordinates: 33.80°N 75.10°E
- Country: India
- Union territory: Jammu and Kashmir
- District: Budgam
- Elevation: 1,577 m (5,174 ft)

Population (2011)
  - Total: 212,233

Languages
  - Official: Kashmiri, Urdu, Hindi, Dogri, English
- Time zone: UTC+5:30 (IST)
- Pin code: 191113
- Vehicle registration: JK04
- Website: budgam.nic.in

Chadoora (Urdu pronunciation: [t͡ʃɑːɖuːɾɑː] ; Kashmiri pronunciation: [t͡soːɖur]) is a town and a Municipal committee in Budgam district in the Indian union territory of Jammu and Kashmir. Famous Sufi and alim Mir Shams-ud-Din Araqi is buried here. The town is situated 14 kilometres (8.7 mi) away from Srinagar and is connected to the city through an electric bus service since April 2023. The postal code for the tehsil is 191113.

== Demographics ==
In 2011, there were a total of 30,390 families residing in Chadoora Tehsil. The average sex ratio of Chadoora Tehsil is 869. 22.3% of the total population lives in Urban areas while 77.7% live in Rural areas.

Demographics (2011 Census)
	Total	Male	Female
Population	212,233	113,529	98704
Scheduled caste	188	177	11
Scheduled tribe	6,282	3297	2985
Literacy	62.54%	73.62%	49.93%
Main Workers	43,893	39522	4371
Non-working	136,577	60217	76360
