= Tosa Maidan =

- Meadow
- The Tosamaidan Meadows
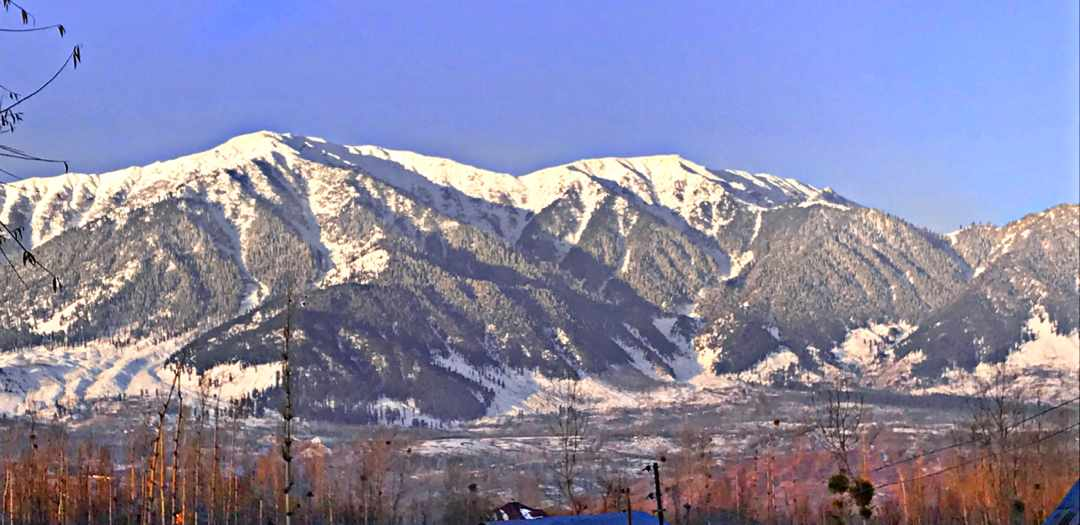
- Pirpanchal Guarding Tosamaidan
- Nickname: Bahak
- Location in Jammu & Kashmir, India Tosa Maidan (India)
- Coordinates: 33°55′4″N 74°29′57″E
- Country: India
- Union Territory: Jammu & Kashmir
- Division: Kashmir
- District: Budgam
- Tehsil: Khag

Languages
  - Official: Kashmiri, Urdu, Hindi, Dogri, English
- Time zone: UTC+5:30 (IST)
- PIN: 193411

Tosa Maidan (or Toshamaidan) is a tourist destination and a hill station in the Khag area of the Budgam district in the Kashmir Valley of the Indian union territory of Jammu and Kashmir. The name also marks the historic Tosa Maidan route into the Kashmir Valley from the Poonch Valley. In fact, the original name of Tosa Maidan appears to have been "Tosa Marg". Mahmud of Ghazni and the Sikh monarch Ranjit Singh attempted to invade the Kashmir Valley via this route following the Battle of Shopian

== The meadow ==
Bounded by dense forests, the Tosa Maidan meadow is situated about 25 km (16 mi) from Khag at the foot of the Pir Panjal range. After crossing the upper mountain reaches of Habber, Drang, Sitaharan, Zakhora and other small villages, one reaches the pasture of Tosa Maidan.

Tosa Maidan is the largest pasture in its surrounding areas, 3 miles in length and 1.5 miles in width. Sky-touching deodars fence this pasture presenting a view of a green carpet in summer. During the summer, the camps of the Gujjar community and shepherds with their grazing sheep in the pastures present a riveting picture. Also, the fragrance of wild flowers refreshes the whole environment.

== The route ==
Tosa Maidan route

According to M. A. Stein, the Tosa Maidan route starts from the Drang village (going out from the Kashmir valley). After crossing the Tosa Maidain meadow, it ascends gently to an elevation of 13,000 ft at the top of Pir Panjal range. "The ascent is so gradual and easy that... the construction of cart-roud would so far meet with little difficulty." There are several streams originating at the top of the range at this locale, all of which join to form the Sukhnag river.

At the top of the Pir Panjal range, there are a number of passes leading to the Poonch Valley. The most often used pass is called Chinamarg Gali, once known as the Tosa Maidan pass, near the Daman Sar lake. It provides a steep descent into the Loran Valley, passing by the village of Sultanpathri. At the southwest is another pass called Pathri ki Gali, near the Pam Sar lake (which is also the source of the main stream feeding the Sukhnag river). This provides a gentler descent into another branch of the Loran Valley, which meets up with the first route near the village of Loran. Both the branches of Loran streams feed the Mandi River.

To the north of Chinamrag Gali is another pass Jamianwali Gali, which descends into the Gagri Valley. This pass provides a longer route to Poonch.

== History ==
The Tosa Maidan route into the Kashmir Valley was of high importance during the Lohara dynasty of Srinagar (1003–1320 CE), as is evident from its repeated mention in the last two Books of Kalhana's Rajatarangini. The ruling house of the Lohara state, based in the Loran valley, took over the reins of Kashmir after the death of its king Kshemagupta, who had married a Lohara princess. Samgramaraja was the first full-fledged ruler of the dynasty. During his rule, Mahmud of Ghazni attempted to invade Kashmir via the Tosa Maidan route, once in 1003 and another time in 1021. In both the instances, he was blocked by the Lohara fort (Loharkot) that guarded the route. Mahmud was unable to conquer the fort itself. In the second instance, he also suffered a disruption of communications due to a heavy snowfall. Historian Mohibbul Hasan states that this was the first serious reverse suffered by Mahmud in India.

M. A. Stein states that, even before the time of Lohara dynasty, the route must have been quite important. It provided the shortest route between Srinagar and Poonch as well as access to the western Punjab areas between the Jhelum and Indus rivers, which were under the control of Kashmir until medieval times. The route was also the "easiest and safest route in that direction", since it provided easy ascent from the Kashir Valley and was well-guarded by the Loharkot fort. Al Beruni stated that brisk trade was carried out along this route.

The importance of the route declined after the Mughal rule, during which the Pir Panjal Pass was developed as an Imperial Road, and the Afghan Durrani rule, during which the Jhelum Valley cart-road was developed. Even so, Maharaja Ranjit Singh of the Sikh Empire attempted two invasion Kashmir via the Tosa Maidan route in 1814 and 1819. The first time, his army was divided into two forces, one attacking the Pir Panjal Pass and the other the Tosa Maidan meadow. At the meadow, Ranjit Singh was blocked by the Durrani defences. He also suffered difficulty of maintaining supplies and was forced to retreat. Later in 1819, all the Sikh forces were concentrated on Tosa Maidan and conquered the Durrani forces.

=== Partition and war ===
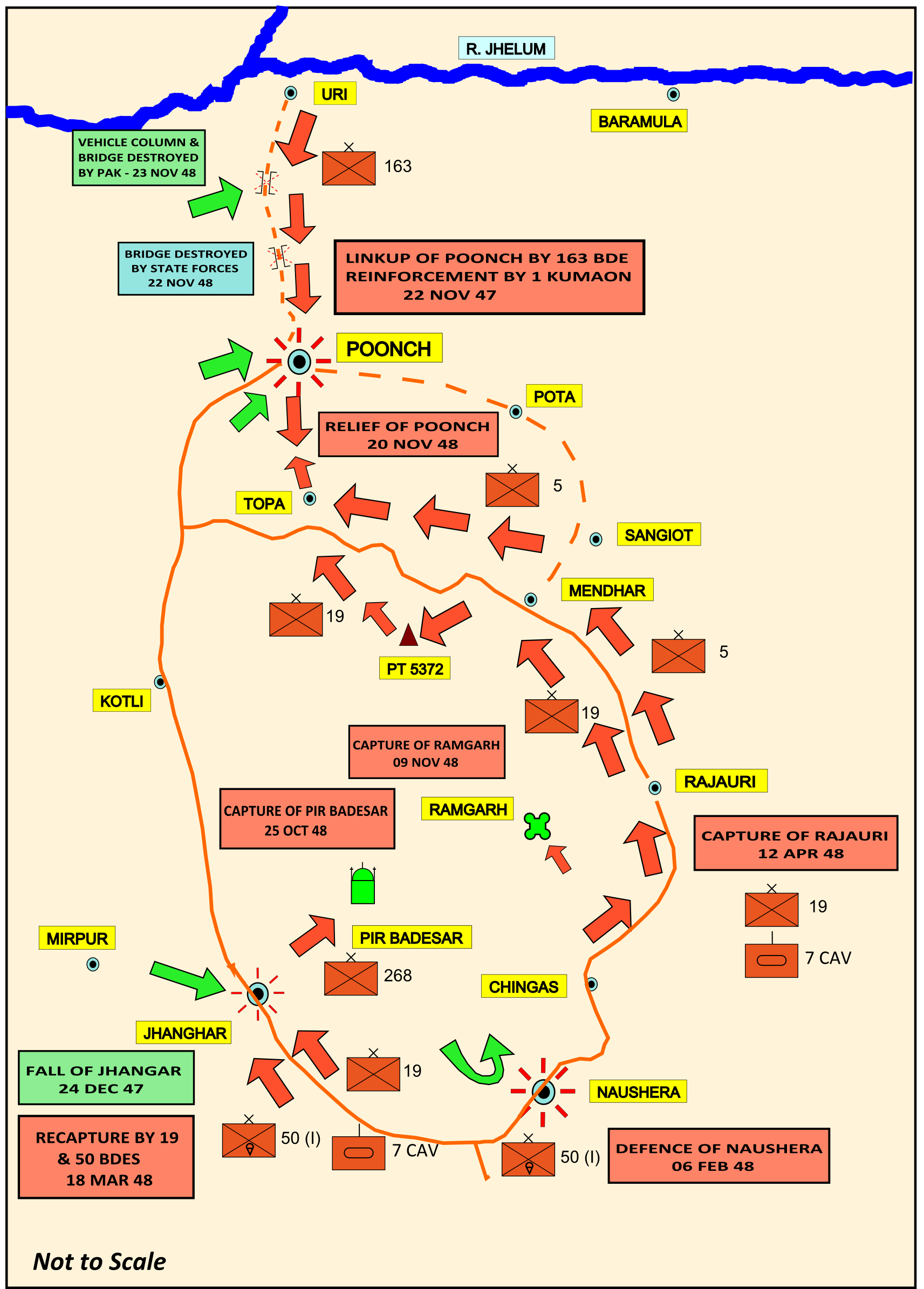
Operation Easy, Poonch link-up

Soon after the Partition of India, the Muslims of the western tehsils of Poonch (especially the Bagh and Sudhnoti tehsils) rebelled against the Hindu Maharaja of the princely state of Jammu and Kashmir. On 22 October 1947, raiders from Pakistan joined the rebels, leading to the First Kashmir War. The State Forces garrison at Poonch is said to have been besieged. The majority of the Tosa Maidan route up to the Pir Panjal range is likely to have come under the control of the rebels.

After India sent its armed forces to defend the state following the Maharaja's accession, the Poonch garrison was maintained by air dropping supplies. Towards the end of 1948, the Indian Army's Operation Easy dispatched forces from Rajouri and Uri to link up at Poonch and establish a line of defence along Uri–Poonch-Nowshera line. After this was accomplished, the State Forces from the garrison fanned out in the area east of the line, clearing it of hostile forces. The Tosa Maidan route was thus secured by India.

=== Post-Partition history ===
In 1964, the Tosa Maidan meadow was leased to the Indian Army on a 50-year lease for use as an artillery firing range. Before the lease came up for renewal on 18 April 2014, the local residents protested against an extension of the lease. Consequently, the lease was terminated, and the Tosa Maidan meadow has been open to visitors since 30 May 2016.

== Bibliography ==
- De Bourbel, Le Marquis (1897), Routes in Jammu and Kashmir, Calcutta: Thacker, Spink and Co.
- Ganjoo, S.K (1998), Kashmir: History and Politics, New Delhi: Commonwealth Publishers
- Hasan, Mohibbul (1959), Kashmir under the Sultans, Aakar Books, ISBN 978-81-87879-49-7
- Mason, Major Kenneth (1929), Routes in the Western Himalaya, Kashmir, Etc., Volume I (PDF), Surveyor General of India
- Nalwa, Vanit (2009), Hari Singh Nalwa - Champion of the Khalsaji, New Delhi: Manohar Books, ISBN 978-81-7304-785-5
- Stein, M. A (1899), Memoir on Maps Illustrating Ancient Geography of Kashmir, Calcutta: Baptist Mission Press
