= Bagati Kani Pora =

Bagati Kani Pora Bageait Kanpur (باغٲتؠ کٔنؠ پوٗر) B.K. Pora
- Village
- Location in Jammu and Kashmir, India Bagati Kani Pora (India)
- Coordinates: 34.02°N 74.82°E
- Country: India
- Union Territory: Jammu and Kashmir
- District: Budgam

Population (2011)
  - Total: 4,071

Languages
  - Official: Kashmiri, Urdu, Hindi, Dogri, English
- Time zone: UTC+5:30 (IST)
- PIN: 190015

Bagati Kani Pora or B.K. Pora is a village and municipality in Budgam district of the Indian union territory of Jammu and Kashmir.

== Demographics ==
According to the 2011 census of India, Wavoora has 694 households. The literacy rate of B.K. Pora village was 77.30% compared to 67.16% of Jammu and Kashmir. In Wavoora, Male literacy stands at 84.89% while the female literacy rate was 69.76%.

Demographics (2011 Census)
	Total	Male	Female
Population	4071	2028	2043
Children aged below 6 years	502	248	254
Scheduled caste	0	0	0
Scheduled tribe	27	10	17
Literacy	77.30%	84.89%	69.76%
Workers (all)	1336	1049	287
Main workers (total)	925	–	–
Marginal workers (total)	411	253	158

== Transport ==
=== Road ===
Bagati Kani Pora is connected by road with other places in Jammu and Kashmir and India by the NH 1. Also this road was the oldest route for Srinagar Airport.

=== Rail ===
The nearest railway station to B.K Pora is Srinagar railway station located at a distance of 3 km (1.9 mi) in Nowgam.

=== Air ===
The nearest airport is Srinagar International Airport located at a distance of 14 km (8.7 mi).

== See also ==
- Jammu and Kashmir
- Srinagar
- Dooniwari
- Budgam
