= Mazhom railway station =

Railway station in Jammu and Kashmir, India

Mazhom

General information
- Location: Budgam, Jammu and Kashmir
- Coordinates: 34.11068°N 74.61916°E
- System: Indian Railways station
- Line: Northern railway
- Platforms: 2
- Tracks: 3

Construction
- Structure type: Standard on-ground station
- Parking: Yes

Other information
- Status: Active
- Station code: MZMA
- Zone(s): Northern Railway
- Division(s): Jammu
Location

Mazhom Railway Station, also known as Mazhama railway station, lies on Northern Railway Network Zone of Indian Railways. It is situated 20 kilometres (12 mi) west of Srinagar on Gulmarg Road. It is the major railway stations in Budgam district. The station connects Magam town (3 km away from station) with rest of the parts of state. The station comes under Firozpur division of Indian railways and has an average elevation of 1,581 meters (5,187 ft) above mean sea level.

== Design ==
The station features Kashmiri wood architecture, with an intended ambience of a royal court which is designed to complement the local surroundings to the station. Station signage is predominantly in Urdu, English and Hindi.

== History ==
The station has been built as part of the Jammu–Baramulla line mega project, intending to link the Kashmir Valley with Jammu Tawi and the rest of the Indian rail network.

== Controversy ==
The railway station was named by Northern Railways as Rajwansheer railway station which led to the large scale controversy by the local population. The controversy was resolved in December 2009 by the intervention of Omar Abdullah and the station was renamed as Mazhom railway station.

== See also ==
- Budgam railway station
