= Magam =

- Town
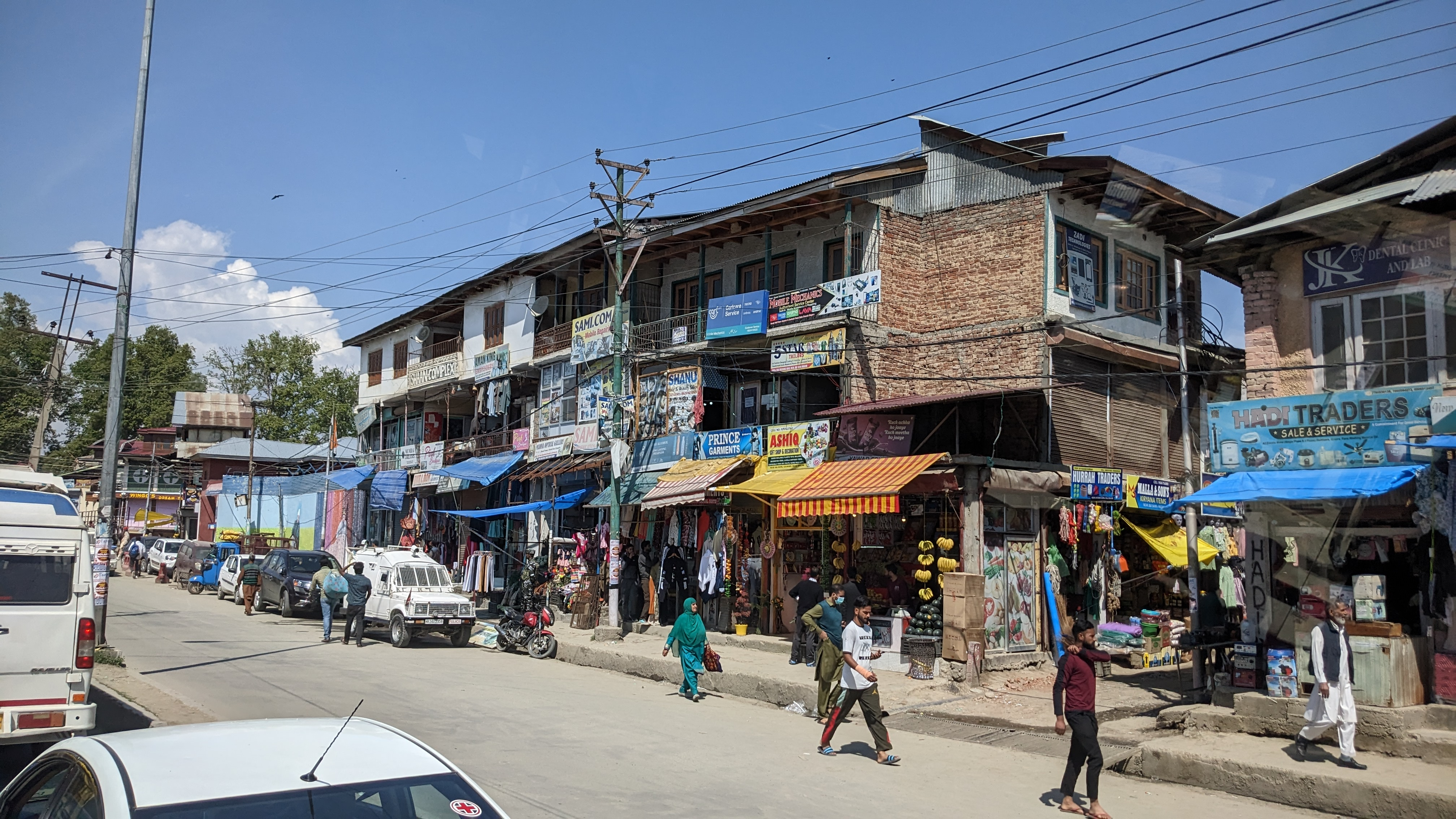
- Magam town in 2023

- Location in Jammu and Kashmir, India Magam (India)
- Coordinates: 34.092778°N 74.591389°E
- Country: India (Indian Administrated J&K)
- Union territory: Jammu and Kashmir
- District: Budgam
- Elevation: 1,569 m (5,148 ft)

Languages
  - Official: Kashmiri, Urdu, Hindi, Dogri, English
- Time zone: UTC+5:30 (IST)
- PIN: 193401

Magam is a tehsil in central Kashmir's Beerwah sub-district. It is also a town, notified area committee, and a block in Budgam district in the Indian-administered union territory of Jammu and Kashmir. It is 11 km (6.8 mi) away from sub-district headquarter Beerwah and 20 km (12 mi) away from Srinagar, the summer capital of Jammu and Kashmir. Magam comes under both Budgam and Baramulla districts, and is the main business hub in the area, located on the way to Gulmarg. The Idara Abu Fazal Abbas Islamic Library, opened in Magam in 1985, is the largest Islamic private library in Jammu and Kashmir.

== Economy ==
Magam is considered the hub of business in district Budgam due to its connectivity with various districts like Budgam, Baramulla and Srinagar. Due its growing business activity, many commercial financial institutions have a presence in Magram; it has seven ATM machines and seven commercial Banks.

Magam is also known as the gateway of Gulmarg, a tourist destination only 25 km (16 mi) away from it.

== Demographics ==
As of 2011, Magam had a population of 5,470, of which 18% is under 6 years of age. Magam has an average literacy rate of 51.22%, 27.28% lower than the national average of 78.5%. The male literacy rate in Magam is 57%, while the female rate is 42%.

== Education ==
Magam has two higher secondary schools namely Government Boys Higher Secondary Institute, Government Girls Higher Secondary Institute. At the secondary level, it has: Lucent International school; RMP school; Green View Public High School; Government middle school for boys and girls (separate); Yagipora, Raheislam Educational Organisation, the New Convent School. Lucent International School is a franchise of Dehradun that provides transport to all connected areas of Budgam district and Srinagar.

These institutes offer teaching in the arts, science, and commerce streams. Government Degree College Magam was established in 2012. The college offers courses like BA, B.Com, and BBA. The College also hosts an IGNOU Study Centre (30026) where distance education is offered. A technical institute operates there. Himayat centres play a role in Magam to provide student internships.

== Transport ==
Magam is well-connected with the State and District Highway roads; it is also connected by rail to Srinagar and Gulmarg. Mazhom railway station is located 2 km (1.2 mi) from Magam. The town has a post office. Two bus stands provide transportation to adjoining areas.

Magam is famous for tanga (a light horse-drawn two-wheeled vehicle). These tangas were first used by tourists to travel from Magam to Gulmarg and for other local transport. These tangas can still be seen in Magam. Tonga ride is still known as Kings' ride.
