= Beerwah, Jammu and Kashmir =

Beerwah Beeru
- Town
- The Town And The Commonality Of Beerwah Along Banks Of Sukhnag River
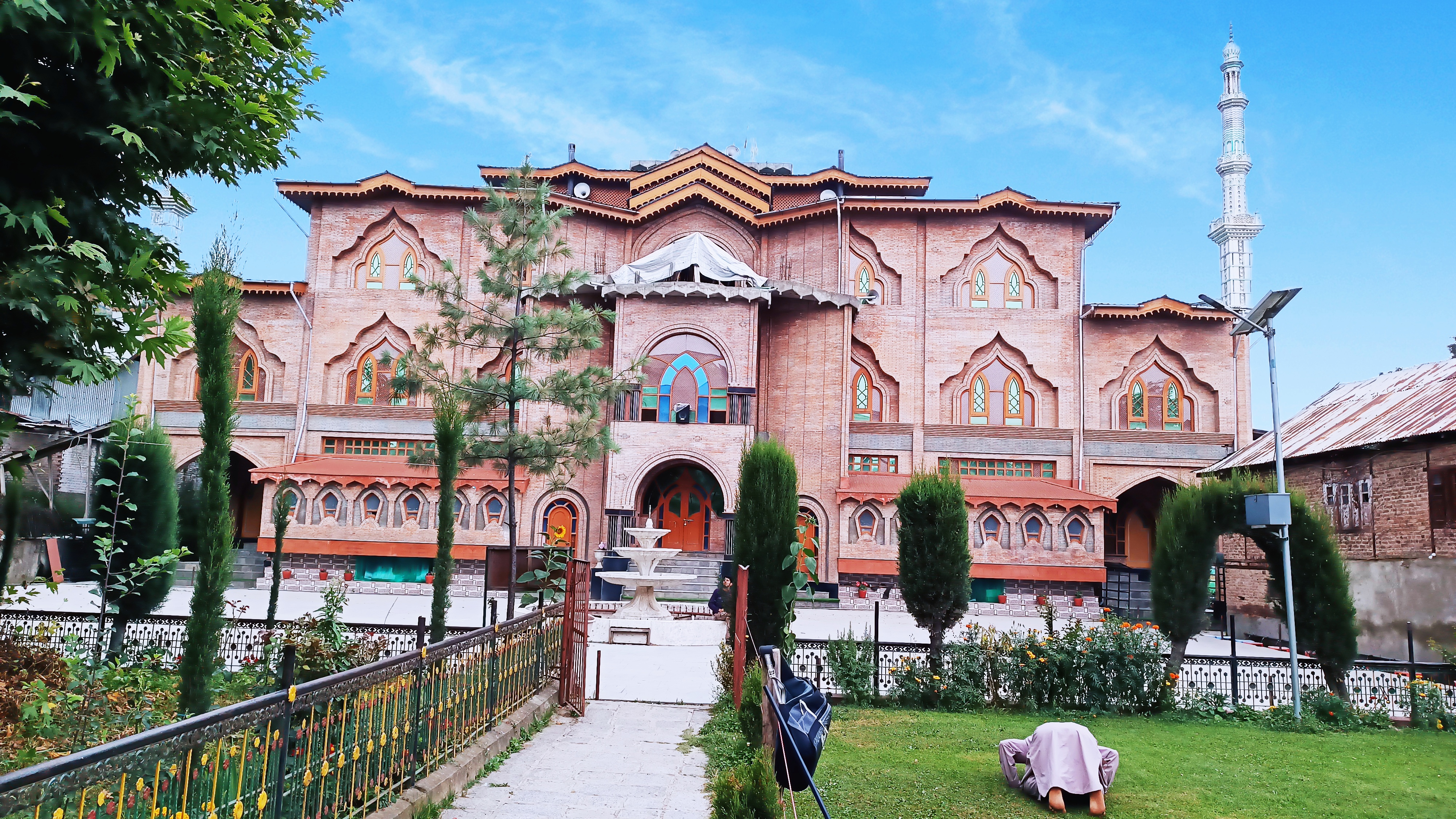
- Jamia Masjid Beerwah
- Nickname: The Gate Way To Doodhpathri
- Location in Jammu and Kashmir Beerwah (India)
- Coordinates: 34°00′46″N 74°35′42″E
- Country: India (Indian Administrated J&K)
- Union territory: Jammu and Kashmir
- District: Budgam
- Tehsil Established: 1883
- Named for: Bairam Hillock
- Municipal committee: Townhall of Beerwah
- Villages in Beerwah: No Of Villages: 126

Government
  - Type: Municipal committee Beerwah
  - Body: Beerwah Municipal Committee

Area
  - Total: 4,950 km^{2} (1,910 sq mi)
- Elevation: 1,598 m (5,243 ft)

Population (2016)
  - Total: 168,348
  - Density: 34.0/km^{2} (88.1/sq mi)
- Demonym(s): Beerwek, Beerweigns

Languages
  - Official: Kashmiri, Urdu, Hindi, Dogri, English
  - Spoken: Kashmiri
- Time zone: UTC+5:30 (IST)
- Postal code: 193411
- Vehicle registration: JK04

Beerwah also pronounced as Beeru is a subdistrict, tourist destination and one of the oldest towns of Jammu and Kashmir and a municipal committee in Budgam district in the Indian administered union territory of Jammu and Kashmir. It is also one of the oldest tehsils of Jammu and Kashmir with one of the largest towns in Budgam district. En route on NH701A. Beerwah is 27 km (17 mi) away from the summer capital Srinagar via Bemina, 31 km (19 mi) via Magam, 33 km (21 mi) via Soibugh and 35 km (22 mi) via Budgam. Beerwah subdistrict has 4 tehsils namely Beerwah, Magam, Narbal and Khag. Beerwah is located along the banks of River Sukhnaag.

The name Beerwah has been derived from a Sanskrit word "Behroop" which means land of springs. This is due to the abundance of natural springs in the area. Beerwah has seven springs in the town area.

Beerwah is the major route to the snow resorts of Doodhpathri and Tosamaidan. Doodhpathri lies 19 km (12 mi) away from Beerwah via Arizal and Tosamaidan lies 23 km (14 mi) away from Beerwah via Arizal. Beerwah is known as "The Gateway of Doodhpathri" and also "The Gateway of Tosamaidan". A decade ago Beerwah was the main route to visit famous tourist spot Gulmarg.

== Geography ==
Beerwah is located at an altitude of 1,598 metres (5,243 ft) above sea level, between 75° E longitude and 34° N latitude at the base of the Pir Panjal mountain range. It is surrounded by plains to the north, east, south, and southwest. The town is flanked by a hill called Bairam on its southern side. At the eastern side of this Bairam is located the celebrated cave connected with life of Acharya Abhinavagupta, the greatest Shiva philosopher of Kashmir. The celebrated cave is located at Bairam at the height of nearly 85 meter on the side of the ridge overlooking the crescent shaped narrow valley of evergreen forests with a Sukhnag River flowing through it. The landscape is made up of plateau-like terraces known as karewas.

The region contains forested areas with several mountain rivers and streams, including the Mala Kol, Lear Kol, Ahij Kol, Laen, Zaen, Mean and Sona Mean. The Ahij Kol, Laen and Sona Maen share a source at Sukhnag. The Mala Kol is locally known as the "deaf and dumb stream" due to a legend that when saint Syed Taj-ud-Din arrived in Khag, the stream silently followed him from Sukhnag to Sikandarpora. Local elders continue to tell stories about other local streams.

River Sukhnag divides the town of Beerwah into Old town (West bank) and New town (East bank).

=== Pastures ===
Tosamaidan is a large pasture with a historical background. Bounded by dense forests of deodars, it is about 10 km (6.2 mi) from Khag in the Himalayas. It was a frequent route for Mughals travelling from Poonch and Punjab to Kashmir. Until 2017 it was occupied by Indian forces, many people have died due to the abandoned explosive materials in vast tracts of pastures. Today the area is frequently used by local shepherds and the Gujjar community. Many people go there in search of some medicinal plants.

Pehjan is an alpine pasture about 25 km (16 mi) from Khag in the lap of the Himalayas. Wular Lake can be seen from this resort. It features local flowers and plant life and scenic views from the Nanga Parbat peak (26,696 feet [8,137 m]).

The Khag pasture is located in the southwest of Kashmir, 8,000 to 14,000 ft above sea level. It is surrounded by mountains whose average height reaches 17,000 feet (5,200 m). It is frequently scenic in the summer season, when Nomadic Bakarwals bring their cattle to graze.

=== Springs ===
The region has a number of springs of local and tourist significance.

Sutharan is located near Tosamaidan and the Line of Actual Control. According to local legend, (Vanvas) Lord Ram Chandra stayed here during his 12-year-long exile with Lakshman and Sita. The spring's name comes from Sita who is said to have bathed in the spring.

Naranag spring, or Narain Nag, is located near the Khag village. According to local legend, an ascetic passing through once dropped a bag full of sheep dung into the lake. When he reached Khag several days later, he saw the dung floating on the surface of the Naranag. He returned to Tosamaidan and sprinkled some turmeric powder into the lake, which appeared in the water in the Naranag.

The Sukhnag (Sokhanag), known locally as the "spring of solace," cascades in a 20-foot (6.1 m) high waterfall at Kanj Zubji.

Pushkar Nag is located to the east of Poshker village between Khag and Ferozpora, and is named for the village of its origin. According to local history, during the month of Sawan, Kashmiri Pandits would offer prayers and take a ritual dip in the spring. Some devotees continue to perform the ritual today.

Gandhak Nag is a sulfur spring in the Darang Khaipora village of Khag. The healing properties of the sulfur make the spring locally significant.

=== Natural formations ===
Nakwaer Pal (the "nostril rock") is located near the Pehjan pasture. It is 14,000-foot (4,300 m) high and is the highest peak of the range. According to local history, when Kashmir valley was a lake (Sati Sar), boats would be anchored to this rock. Today there is an iron hook within it (Ded Bal), also known as Lal Khanen Gher. Today, shepherds and Gujjars come from adjacent villages with their livestock.

== History ==
Beerwah served as a pargana during the Mughal reign. It consists of areas of the former Srinagar district.

In 1766, a fort was built on Bairam hill by Governor Lal Mohammad Khatak. It was repaired in 1801 by Governor Abdullah Khan but was destroyed in an earthquake in 1884.

The region consisting of Budgam, Beerwah and Baramullah achieved tehsil status as Tehsil Ranbir Singh in 1962, under Sir Syed Sani Mawlana Syed Ali Shah Bukhari. The tehsil of Budgam was split off later in 1979.

The region was granted subdistrict status in the 1970s with the support of Mawlana Syed Ali Shah Bukhari, but it was not fully implemented until 2013 by Chief Minister Omar Abdullah and Mirwaiz of Central Kashmir Mawlana Latief Bukhari.

== Demographics ==
As of 2011 India census, Beerwah had a population of 167850, consisting of 53% men and 47% women. Beerwah has an average literacy rate of 63%, higher than the national average of 59.5%.67% of men and 53% of women are literate. 16% of the population is under 6 years of age. Beerwah has a total of 124 villages with majority sunni Muslim villages, 7 shia Muslim and 5 Sikh villages. Beerwah is the largest constituency in the Budgam district by number of voters.

== Economy ==
Much of the local economy is agricultural. Crops grown include rice, mustard, vegetables, apples, walnuts, pears, apricots, cherries and almonds.

Beerwah has a number of post offices, fire stations, banks, police stations, and regional courts. There are three subdivision hospitals and multiple health care units in the villages. A subdivision magistrate (SDM) office opened in Beerwah in 2013 on the establishment of subdistrict status. The Beerwah market is the central business hub of the area.

The economy in Beerwah includes smaller businesses such as carpet design (Kaleen in the Kashmiri language), shawl design and knitwork, and embroidery. Kashmiri carpets and shawls are marketed internationally, but because of increasing prices, family pressure and low income, local textile makers have shifted to other businesses.

== Education ==
Every zone of Beerwah employs a zonal education officer. The schools in the area include both government-run and private schools of varying levels.

In Beerwah there are two higher secondary schools run by the government of Jammu and Kashmir: Boys Higher Secondary School, and Girls Higher Secondary School. Approximately two thousand students attend these institutions.

The government also runs three middle schools and six primary schools within the municipal limits. Many private institutions also run in the town. Mazhar ul Haq High School is the oldest school of the valley which was founded by Sir Syed Sani Mawlana Syed Ali Shah Bukhari in 1934 and was among few schools in the valley which served as the beaconlight for North and Central Kashmir when no other government and private institution existed. It is run by Mazhar ul Haq Trust. SAMIE Institutes was later founded in November 2000 by SAMET under the leadership of one of the prominent educationist and philosophers of central Kashmir Syed Abdul Rouf Bukhari and which provided modern, secular education in the area for last two decades. SAMIE (Syed Ali Memorial Institute of Education) comprises a school, a training college and a nursing college. Government Degree College Beerwah, one of the most prominent Government Degree College affiliated with University of Kashmir, is the only government based institution of higher education in the area.

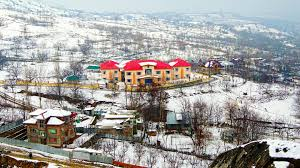
Government Degree College Beerwah

Other institutes include the District Institute of Education and Training (DIET), a teacher-training and education center. In addition, SAM College of Education Beerwah and CED College of Education, located in Narbal are affiliated with University of Kashmir, and Government Degree College, Beerwah functioning under the Ministry of Higher Education serve the area.

== Transportation ==
The majority of Beerwah residents have private means of transportation. A public transportation system also exists that includes buses and cars, with a bus stand and two taxi stands at Beerwah.

The closest airport to Beerwah is the Srinagar Airport (SXR), which is 28 km (17 mi) away.

The nearest railway station to Beerwah is the Mazhom Railway Station Magam, which is 11 km (6.8 mi) away.

The Jammu and Kashmir State Road Transport Corporation (J&K SRTC) connects most major towns and cities to Beerwah through Srinagar via National Highway 1A.

A number of private organisations also run transport companies and 24-hour taxi service.
