= Budgam district =

Budgam district Badgom Badgam
- District of Jammu and Kashmir administered by India
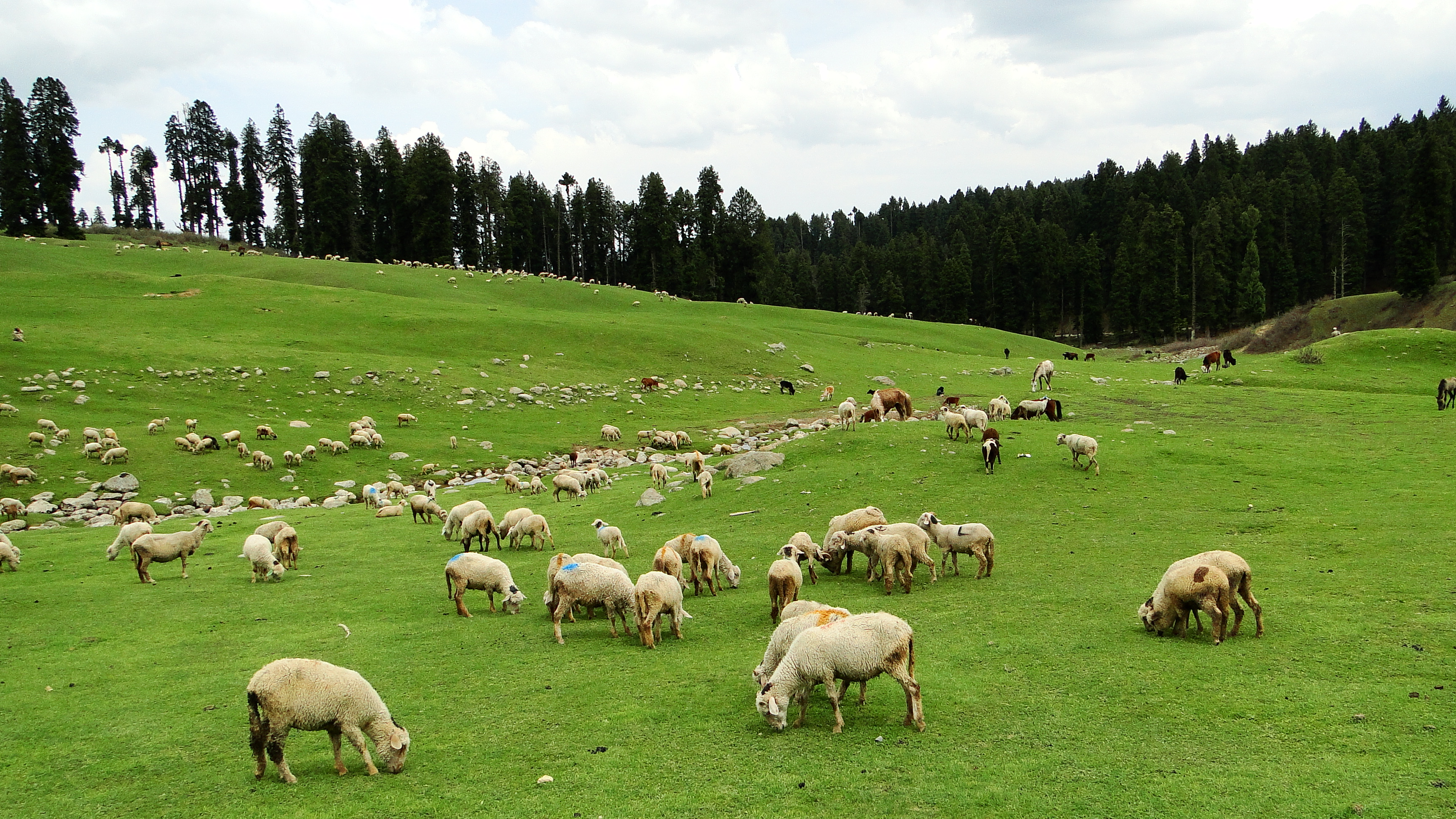
- Doodhpathri pastures in Budgam district
- Nickname: Jackals Cave
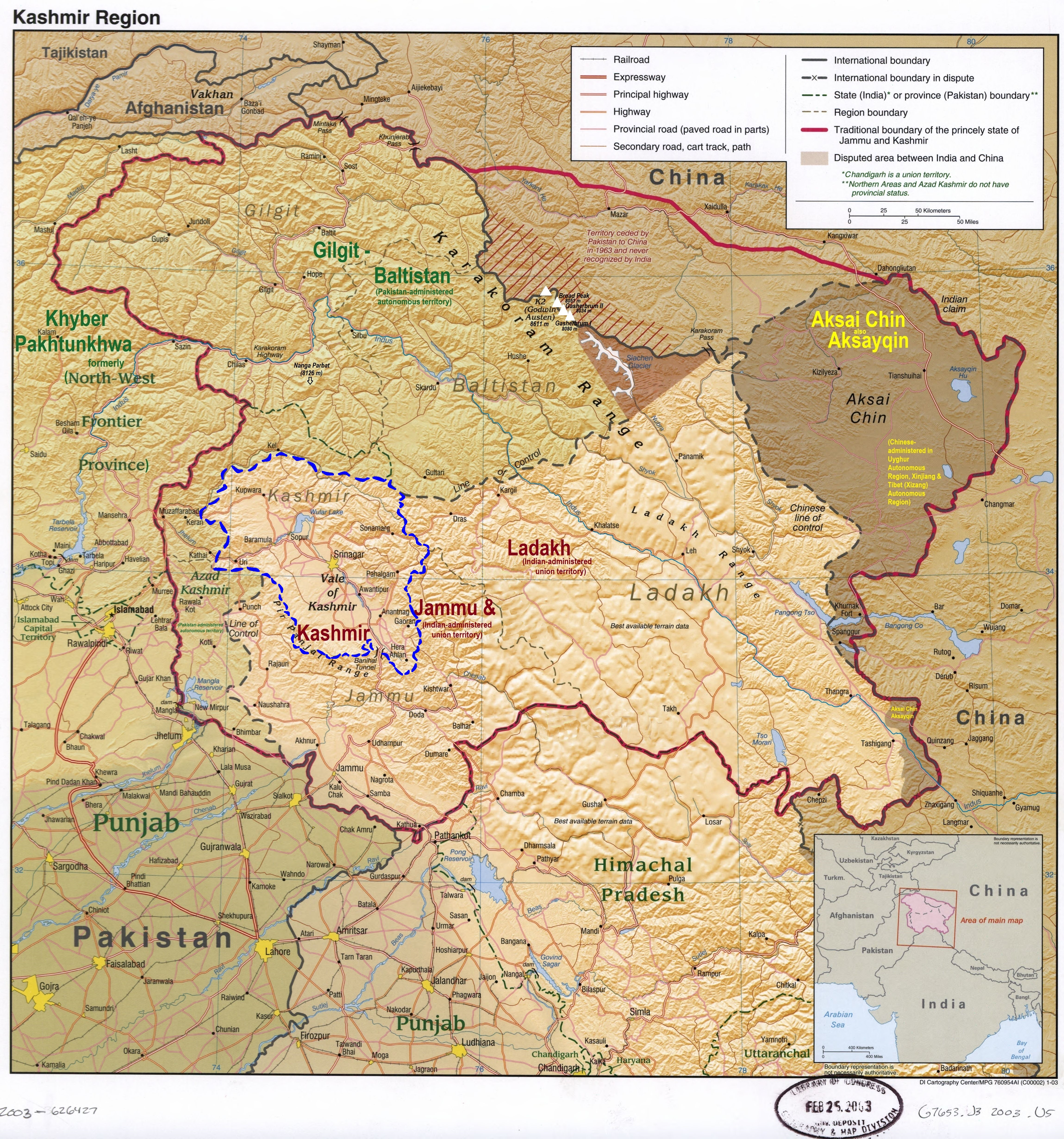
- Budgam district is in Jammu and Kashmir in the Kashmir region It is in the Kashmir division (bordered in neon blue).
- Interactive map of Budgam district
- Coordinates (Budgam): 34°1′12″N 74°46′48″E
- Country: India
- Union Territory: Jammu and Kashmir
- Division: Kashmir
- Established: 1979
- Founder: Aga Syed Yousuf
- Headquarters: Budgam
- Tehsils: 1. Budgam; 2. Beerwah; 3. Chadoora; 4. Khan Sahib; 5. Charari Sharief; 6. B K Pora; 7. Khag; 8. Narbal; 9. Magam

Government
  - Type: District Development Council of Budgam
  - Body: District Development Council
  - DDC Chairman: Nazir Ahmed Khan
  - District magistrate: Athar Aamir Ul Shafi Khan (IAS)

Area
  - Total: 1,370 km^{2} (530 sq mi)

Population (2011)
  - Total: 753,745
  - Density: 537/km^{2} (1,390/sq mi)
- Demonym: Badgaime

Languages
  - Official: Kashmiri, Urdu, Hindi, Dogri, English
- Time zone: UTC+5:30 (IST)
- Postal code: 191111
- Vehicle registration: JK04
- Sex ratio: 1.13250283 ♂/♀
- Literacy: 57.98%
- Villages/Towns: Ichgam, Khan Sahib, Ompora, Beerwah, B K Pora, Chadoora, Magam
- Website: budgam.nic.in

Budgam district is an administrative district of Indian-administered Jammu and Kashmir in the disputed Kashmir region. Created in 1979 with its headquarters at the town of Budgam, it is the district with the largest population of Shia Muslims in the Kashmir Valley.

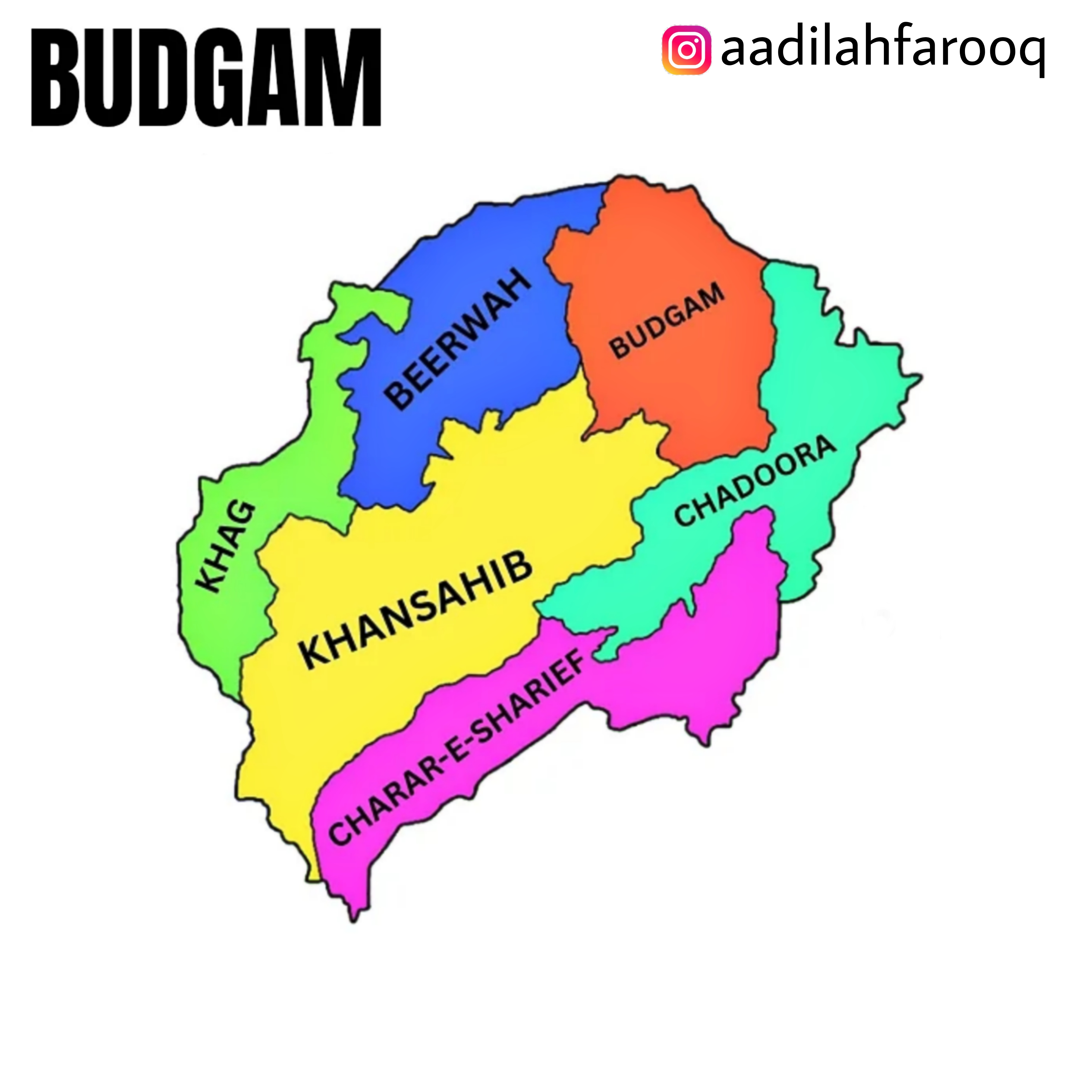
District map of Budgam

== Administration ==
Budgam district is the closest district to the union territory capital Srinagar 11 kilometres (6.8 mi). Budgam district came into existence in 1979, prior to which it was part of Srinagar district. In former times, Budgam was a part of Baramulla district, when Srinagar itself was a constituent of the Anantnag district. It was then known as tehsil Sri Pratap. Historical records suggests that Budgam was also referred to as Pargana Deesu. According to the well-known chronicler Khawaja Azam Demari, the area was also known as Deedmarbag. Budgam district borders the districts of Baramullah and Srinagar in the north, Pulwama in the south and Poonch in the south west.

In 2008, Budgam district consisted of eight blocks. Currently, the district consists of seventeen blocks: Beerwah, Budgam, B.K.Pora, Chadoora, Charari Sharief, Khag, Khansahib, Nagam, Narbal, Pakherpora, Parnewa, Rathsoon, Soibugh, Sukhnag, Surasyar, S.K.Pora and Waterhail. Each block consists of a number of panchayats.

The district is subdivided into the nine tehsils of Charari Sharief Tehsil, Magam tehsil, Beerwah Tehsil, Budgam Tehsil, Chadoora Tehsil, Khansahib Tehsil, Khag Tehsil, BK Pora Tehsil and Narbal Tehsil.

=== District Development Council ===
- Chairperson: Nazir Ahmad Khan (IND)
- Vice-chairperson: Nazir Ahmad Jahara (JKNC)

S.No	Party	Alliance	No. of Members
1.	JKPDP	PAGD	1
2.	JKNC	PAGD	8
3.	JKPDF		2
4.	JKPM		1
5.	Independent		2
Total			14

== Other details ==
Number of Sub-divisions	3
Number of Municipalities	6
Number of Tehsils	9
Number of Blocks	17
Number of Gram Panchayats	281
Number of villages	510

== Demographics ==
Religion in Budgam district (2011)
Religion	Percent
Islam	97.65%
Hinduism	1.34%
Sikhism	0.74%
Other or not stated	0.27%

According to the 2011 census Budgam district has a population of 735,753 roughly equal to the nation of Guyana or the US state of Alaska, making it 494th in India (out of a total of 640). The district has a population density of 554 inhabitants per square kilometre (1,430/sq mi). Its population growth rate over the decade 2001-2011 was 24.14%. Badgam has a sex ratio of 883 females for every 1000 males, and a literacy rate of 56.08% (males 66.30%, females 44.85%), an increase from 42.20% (males 53.13%, females 30.29%) in 2001. Literacy is higher in urban areas (average 68.87%, male 79.46%, female 55.38%) than in rural areas (average 54.01%, male 64.00%, female 43.29%). 12.99% of the population lives in urban areas. Scheduled Castes and Scheduled Tribes make up 0.05% and 3.17% of the population respectively.

Sex Ratio in Badgam District in 2011 Census. (no. females per 1,000 males)
Religion (and population)	Sex Ratio
Muslim (pop 736,054)	915
Hindu (pop 10,110)	109
Sikh (pop 5,559)	674
Other (pop 2,022)	532
Total (pop 753,745)	894

Budgam district: religion, gender ratio, and % urban of population, according to the 2011 Census.
	Hindu	Muslim	Christian	Sikh	Buddhist	Jain	Other	Not stated	Total
Total	10,110	736,054	1,489	5,559	47	6	2	478	753,745
Total	1.34%	97.65%	0.20%	0.74%	0.01%	0.00%	0.00%	0.06%	100.00%
Male	9,119	384,281	965	3,321	36	4	1	314	398,041
Female	991	351,773	524	2,238	11	2	1	164	355,704
Gender ratio (% female)	9.8%	47.8%	35.2%	40.3%	23.4%	33.3%	50.0%	34.3%	47.2%
Sex ratio (no. of females per 1,000 males)	109	915	543	674	–	–	–	–	894
Urban	7,502	89,111	561	635	26	3	0	74	97,912
Rural	2,608	646,943	928	4,924	21	3	2	404	655,833
% Urban	74.2%	12.1%	37.7%	11.4%	55.3%	50.0%	0.0%	15.5%	13.0%

Languages of Budgam district (2011)
1. Kashmiri (94.8%)
2. Gojri (3.01%)
3. Others (2.21%)

At the time of the 2011 Census of India, 94.78% of the population in the district spoke Kashmiri and 3.01% Gojri as their first language.

Shias form 20% of Budgam district's population; almost 30% of the urban population of the district are Shia, whilst the majority of the rural population of the district are Sunni.

== Education ==
There are 590 schools in Budgam, both private and public, 33 of which are Higher Secondary Schools.↵There are 6 Government Degree Colleges;

1. Government Degree College Beerwah
2. Government Degree College Khansahib
3. Government Degree College Magam
4. Sheikh ul Aalam Memorial Degree College Budgam
5. Model Degree College Chrar e Sharif
6. Government Degree College Chadoora

== Railways ==
Budgam district has four railway stations: Budgam, Nadigam, Mazhom and Nowgam, which are all on the Jammu–Baramulla line.

Budgam railway station is located in Ompora town nearly 2.5 km (1.6 mi) from Budgam's district headquarters and 9 km (5.6 mi) from Srinagar's city centre, Lalchowk. It is the biggest railway station in Kashmir division. This railway station has the administrative head controlling the rail service in the Kashmir valley.

== Health care ==
Budgam mainly relies on the hospitals of capital city Of Srinagar. It contains one District Hospital in Budgam Town. One Sub District Hospitals respectively in Beerwah, Khan Sahib, Magam, Chadoora. Outside Budgam railway station, there is a big hospital, named Ibn-Sina Hospital, which is Budgam district's first private hospital.

== Attractions ==
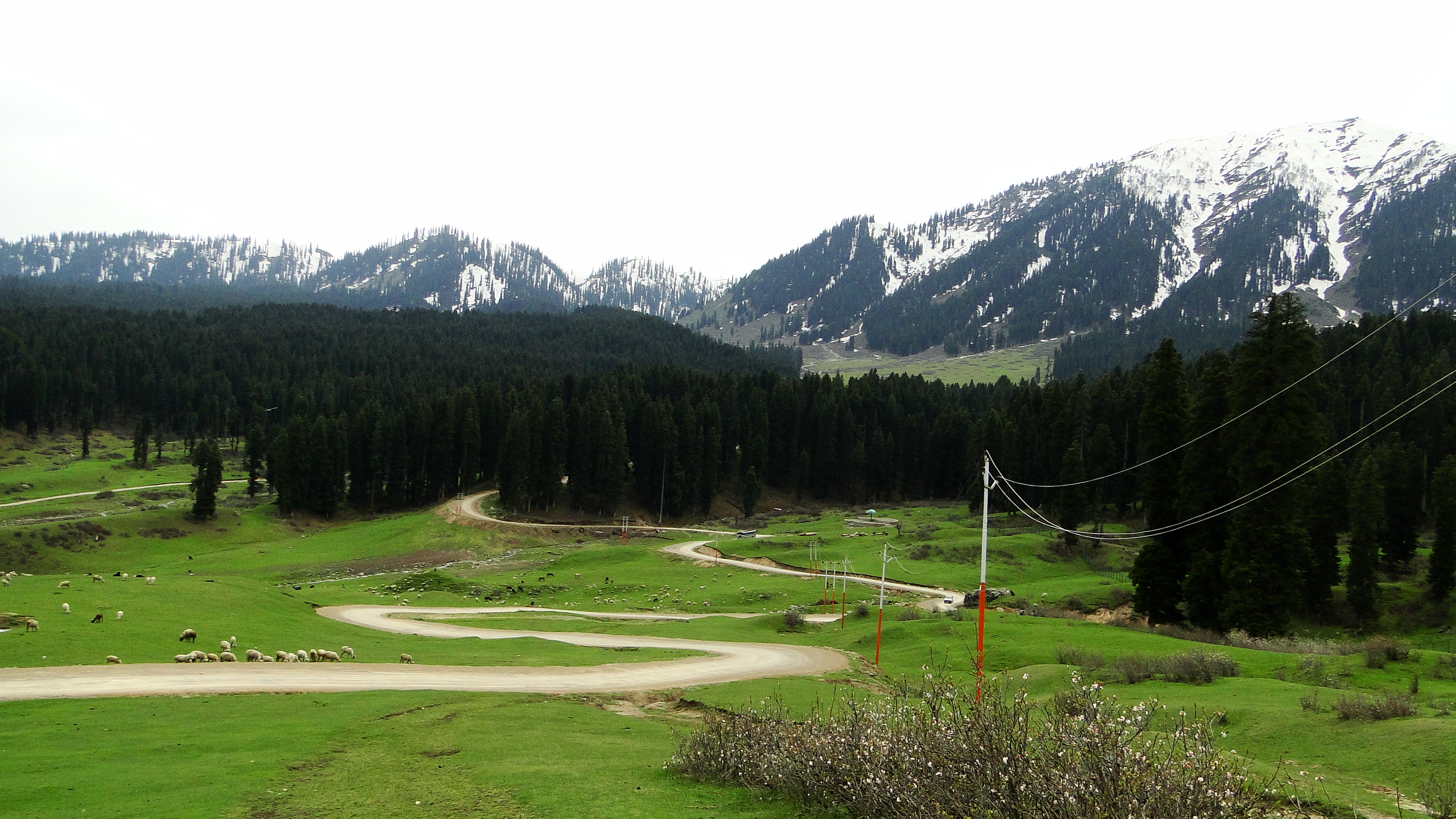
Valley in Budgam district

Budgam contains the only airport in Kashmir Valley. The district's main tourist attractions are Doodhpathri, Yusmarg, Tosamaidan, Nilnag, Haijan. District Budgam offers many stunning locales and has tremendous tourism potential that has largely remained untapped so far. Kani Shawl adorned the caesar's court and was looked upon by Mughals and later by Nawabs as mark of nobility. In 1776, Napoleon Bonaparte presented a Kani shawl to his wife Josephine and with that took off a new fashion trend in Europe. The revered shrine of Sheikh Noor-ud-din Wali can also be found in the Charari Sharief Tehsil of Budgam district. Asia's oldest/largest Chinar resides at Chattergam Budgam. Aga Sahib Shrine and Tomb of Shams-ud-Din Araqi are also situated in this district.

== Notable people ==
- Nund Rishi
- Shamas Faqir
- Ghulam Nabi Gowhar
- Samad Mir
- Aga Syed Yusuf Al-Moosavi Al-Safavi
- Mir Shams-ud-Din Araqi
- Aga Syed Mohammad Fazlullah
- Aga Mir Syed Mohammad Baqir Mosavi
- Aga Syed Mustafa Al-Moosavi
- Aga Syed Mehdi
- Aga Syed Mohsin

== See also ==
- Kupwara district
- Ganderbal district
- Anantnag district
- Pulwama district
