= Zool (festival) =

Zool Zuwūl/Zuwul, زُووٗل/زُوُل (Kashmiri)
- Zool celebrations
- Observed by: Kashmiris, Kashmiri Muslims
- Type: Cultural, Religious, Seasonal
- Celebrations: Marching up to the shrine carrying blazing torches (ləsh), night prayers
- Date: Full moon day of Caitra (March–April)
- 2026 date: 2 April
- 2027 date: 20 April
- Frequency: Annual

Zool is a centuries old spring Religio-cultural and Folk festival celebrated annually in the South Kashmir, particularly Aishmuqam township of Anantnag district in Jammu and Kashmir, India. Held at the hilltop cave shrine of the 15th-century Sufi saint Zainu'd-Din Rishi, the festival features hundreds of devotees marching up the shrine's staircases carrying blazing torches, locally known as ləsh. Traditionally calculated using the Kashmiri (Hindu) lunar calendar, the festival is observed on the full moon of the month of Caitra (15th or 30th Caitra).

== Meaning and etymology ==

The word zuwūl or zuwul (commonly pronounced as zūl) (Note: /zuʋuːl, zuʋul, zuːl/) means 'festal arrangement of lights/lamps' in Kashmiri. The word signifies any extensive, celebratory lighting display like the elaborate decorative lighting arrangements set up during weddings.

The word is traced back to the Old Indo-Aryan form *dīpāvalaka- (attested dīpāvali) meaning 'row of lamps.'

== Origins and folklore ==

The origins of the Zool Festival comprise a layered synthesis of ancient Kashmiri folk traditions, and 15th century Kashmiri Sufism (Rishi order).

=== Ancient folk traditions and mythology ===
Few decades ago there were two festivals held in Maraz (South-Eastern Kashmir).

==== Phrow and throw ====
According to tradition, in old times the inhabitants of Kashmir had every winter to leave the country for six months in the possession of demons. Before departing they set their houses on fire and left them in ashes. This was commemorated as Phrow by lighting bonfires at the end of the month of Āśvina (September–October).

Held on the full moon of the month of Caitra (March–April), Throw was celebrated by burning large bonfires composed of grass and wood. As per tradition, the festival commemorated the return of the valley’s population at the dawn of spring after spending the winter away. The ceremonial fires were lit to symbolically destroy the lingering darkness and residual cold of winter, this survives as the Zool festival.

As per local folklore, the origin of the Zool festival dates back to the reign of a ruler named Ashushah Badshah, when the area of present-day Aishmuqam was terrorised by a formidable demon. To appease the entity, the fearful villagers agreed to a daily offering of food and human sacrifices. There was a young Gujjar man named Bumisad, whose turn for sacrifice coincided with his wedding day. Exhibiting defiance, Bumisad consumed the offerings meant for the demon, reportedly declaring that the food would reach the entity regardless. This act provoked the demon, which manifested as a giant serpent known as Shahmar. A fierce battle ensued between Bumisad and the serpent, lasting for seven days and seven nights. Bumisad ultimately defeated the creature, liberating the village from its subjugation. In celebration of the victory, the villagers illuminated the night with torches.

== Islamic integration ==
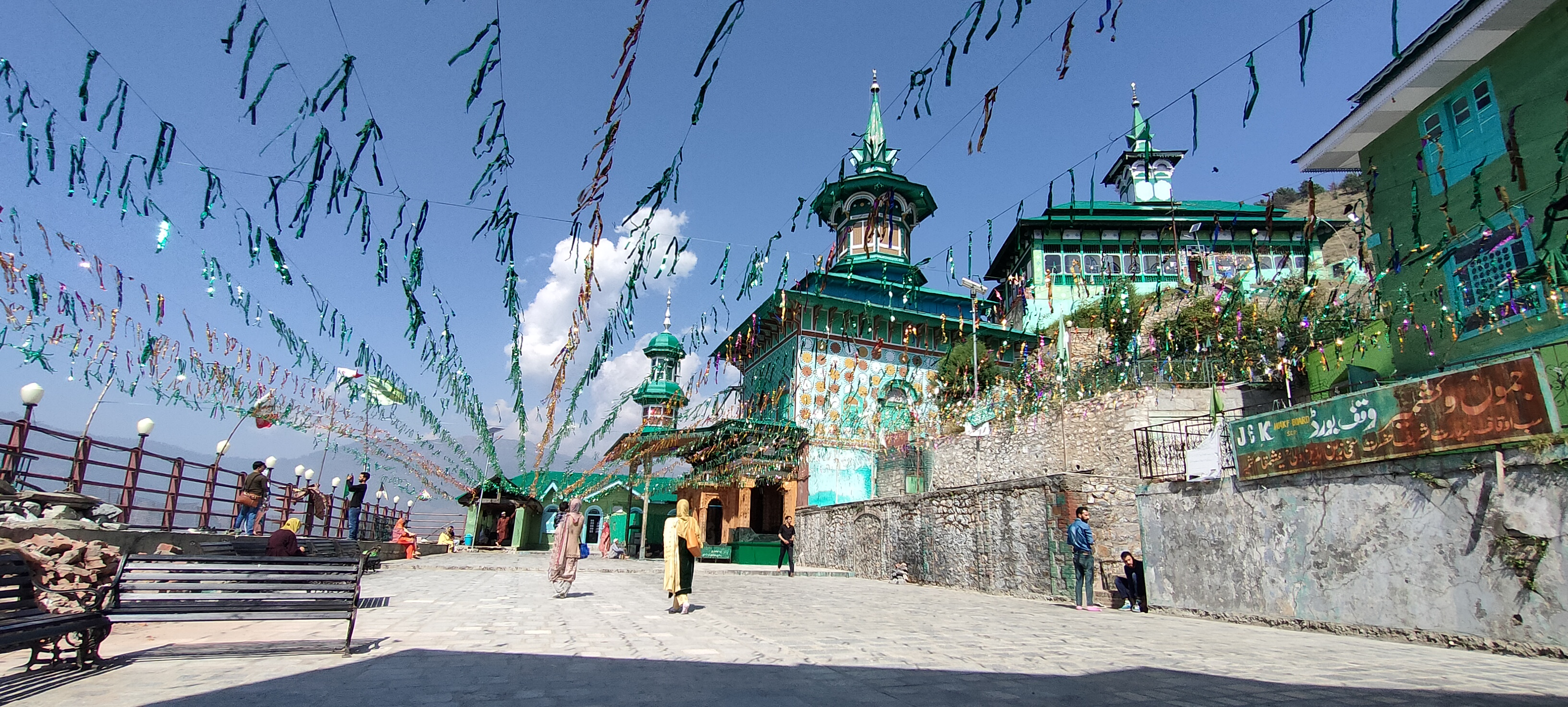
Aishmuqam shrine

In the mediaeval times, this pre-Islamic pagan spring illumination festival became intertwined with the veneration of Hazrat Baba Zainu'd-Din Rishi, a principal disciple of the founder of the Rishi order, Sheikh Nuru'd-Din (Nund Rishi). Born into royalty as Prince Zia Singh of Kishtwar, he converted to Islam after being cured of a fatal illness by Nund Rishi. As per tradition, he was subsequently directed to meditate in a dark, snake-infested cave on the hilltop of Aishmuqam. The villagers gathered outside with blazing pine-wood torches to assist the saint in purifying the cave and driving out malevolent entities, this is commemorated as Zool festival.

== See also ==
- Rishi order
- Aishmuquam
- Nund Rishi
- Lal Ded
- Kashmir Shaivism
- Baba Haneef Ud Din Reshi
- Nasr ud-Din Rishi
