= Baba Haneef Ud Din Reshi =

Shrine of a Sufi at hillock in Jammu and Kashmir

Sufi Baba Haneef Ud Din Reshi Babii Seab
- با با حنیٖفُ الدیٖن ریٖشی
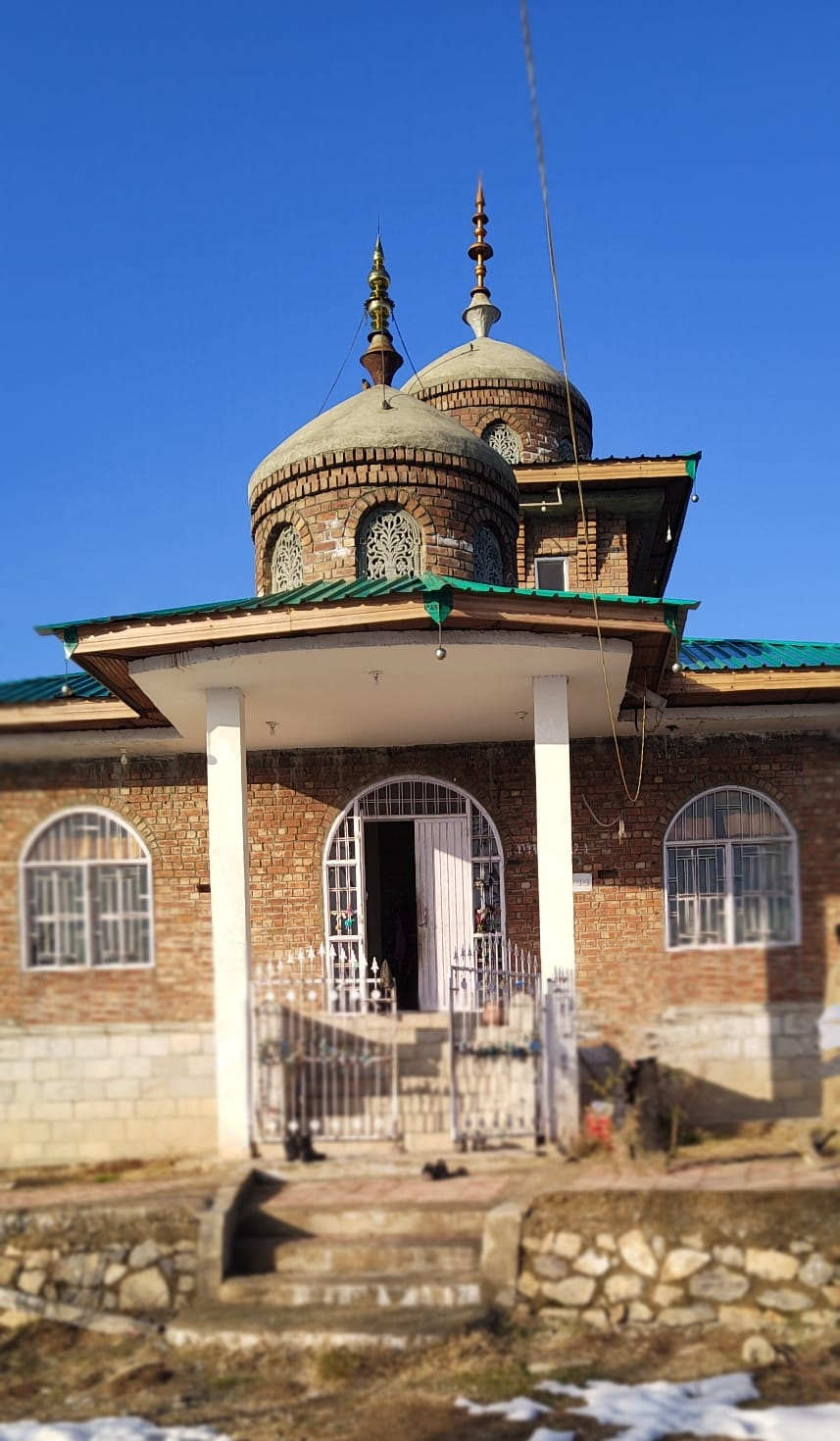
- View of shrine from the front side.

Personal life
- Born: Kashmir
- Died: Rathsun, Kashmir

Religious life
- Religion: Islam
- Denomination: Sunni
- Tariqa: Rishi

Muslim leader
- Disciple of: Zain ud-Din Wali
- Disciples: Rekha Rishi
- Influenced: Mir Sayyid Ali Hamadani, Nund Rishi, Zain Ud Din Wali

Baba Haneef Ud Din Reshi (کٲشُر:با با حنیٖفُ الدیٖن ریٖشی) popularly known as "Babii Seab", was a Sufi of Rishi order, who lived in the area of the Kohi Darwa usually known as Daresh or Darej in Rathsun-Manchama, Budgam Jammu and Kashmir (earlier known as Pargana Manchama). His shrine is located at the top of Kohi Darwa or Darej . He was the disciple of Zain ud-Din Wali of Aishmuquam (who was the disciple of Sheikh Noor ud Din Noorani). Zain ud-Din Wali ordered him to go on the hillock of Rathsun-Manchama village, where he focused on religious practices to increase his spirituality.

== Shrine ==
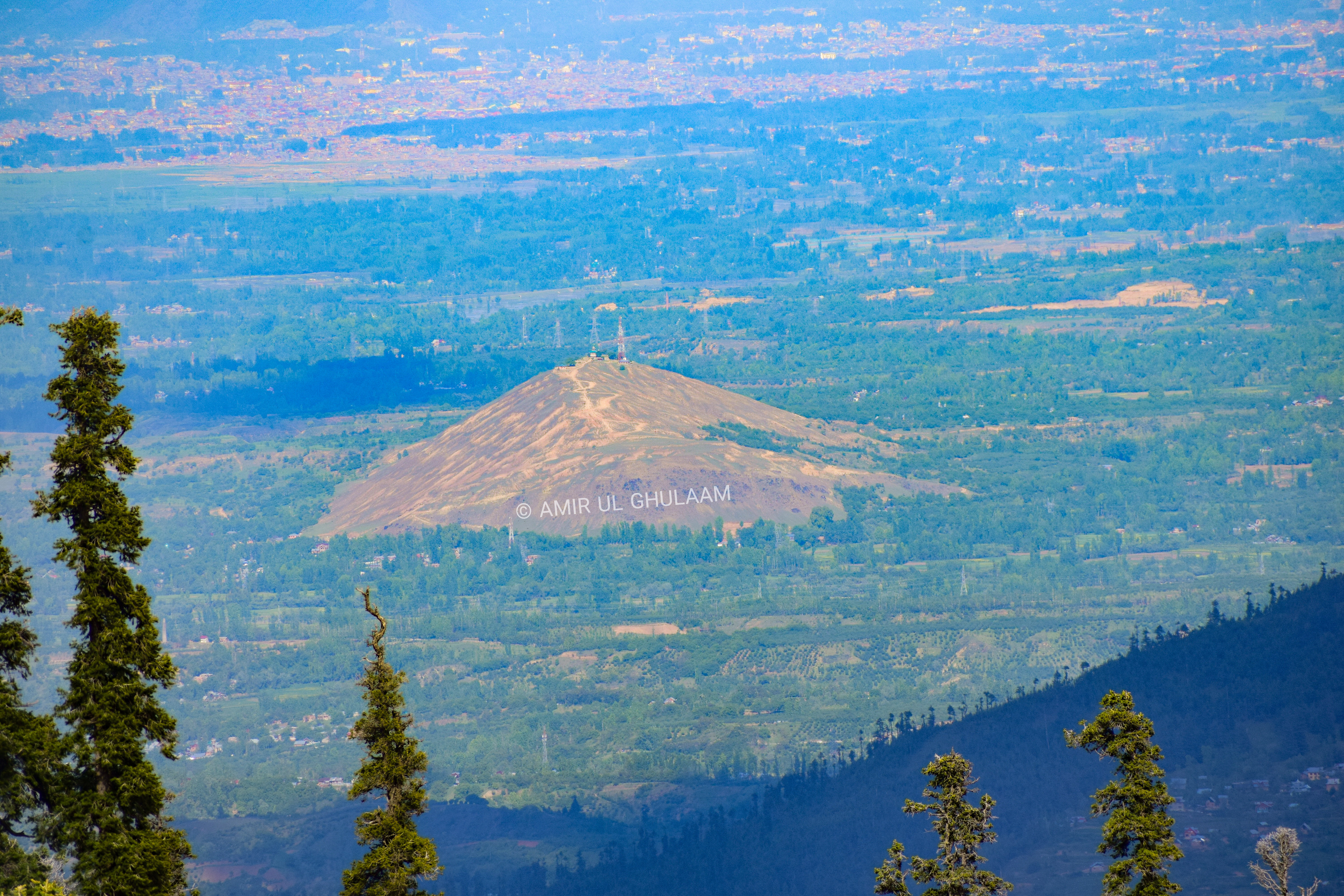
Haneef Ud din rishis peak view from Apharwat

His shrine is located on the top of the hill ('Da-aresh') between Rathsun, Dragar and Manchama (earlier Pargana Manchama) villages. This shrine is about 400 year old. It is 30 km from Srinagar and 4.5 km from Magam town.

== See also ==
- Nund Rishi
- Mir Sayyid Ali Hamadani
- Bulbul Shah
- Baba Naseeb-ud-Din Ghazi
