= Baba Shukur ud-Din Wali =

Indian saint

Wali Baba Shukur ud-Din Wali

Personal life
- Born: 1368 Arath Budgam Pargana Manchamah
- Died: 1465 (aged 96–97)
- Resting place: Sharikot Hill, Watlab, Sopore

Religious life
- Religion: Islam
- Denomination: Sunni
- Tariqa: Rishi order

Baba Shukur ud-Din Wali (born Shukur ud-Din on 790 A.H/1386 A.D) was a Kashmiri Sufi saint associated with the Rishi Sufi order.

== Life ==
Born during the reign of Sultan Qutbu'd-Din Shah, Shukur ud-Din is described in historical accounts as a religious figure devoted to his faith and the Islamic prophet Muhammad.

One day, Baba Shukur ud-Din’s mother was carrying a large basket of food to him while he worked in the fields. On her way, she met two pious men who asked whom the food was for. She told them it was for her son. The men gave her a Qur’anic verse (Bismillah) and instructed her to tell her son to recite it before eating. They also advised her to reduce the size of the food basket a little each day. She followed their instructions carefully, and soon Baba Shukur ud-Din began to change noticeably, marking the beginning of his spiritual journey.

Later, when Baba Shukur ud-Din asked his mother about the changes he had experienced, she recounted the entire incident. When he asked where she had met the two pious men, she pointed toward the south.

Inspired by this, Baba Shukur ud-Din set out on his spiritual journey and eventually reached Charari Sharief, where he met Sheikh Noor ud-Din Noorani, also known as Nund Rishi or Sheikh ul-Alam, the founder of the indigenous Rishi order. After hearing the story, Sheikh Noor ud-Din Noorani directed him to Aishmuquam to receive spiritual training from Sakhi Zain ud-Din Wali.

Baba Shukur ud-Din spent many years under Sakhi Zain-ud-Din’s guidance, absorbing the mystical teachings. Later, Sakhi Zain-ud-Din instructed him to settle and meditate in a cave atop a hill near the village of Watlab in Sopore, overlooking Wular Lake.

== Spiritual life ==
Baba Shukur ud-Din began his spiritual path after meeting Sheikh Noor ud-Din Noorani, who instructed him to study Rishi Sufism under Sakhi Zain al-Din Wali of Aishmuqam. After training there, Zain al-Din Wali sent him to meditate and spread the Rishi order in the region. Shukur ud-Din eventually meditated atop Sharikot Hill in Watlab, overlooking Wular Lake.

According to Mohd Ishaq Khan, Shukur ud-Din had once been a wealthy man but renounced his possessions after a profound inner awakening, which drew several followers, including Dariya Rishi, Regi Rishi, and Bibi Sanga. Dariya Rishi, previously a respected Brahman ascetic devoted to idol worship, was particularly moved by Shukur ud-Din’s austere life and sought a meeting with him. Although Shukur ud-Din initially declined, the ascetic argued to the disciples that he, too, had renounced the world for devotion to God and that people of one faith should not dismiss others. When these views were conveyed to Shukur ud-Din, he agreed to receive him. Their discussion eventually led the Brahman ascetic to abandon idol worship and join the Rishi order. The Rishi movement, characterized by its integration of indigenous ascetic traditions with Islam, was highly regarded in the region. According to the 16th-century historian Abu'l-Fazl in the ''Akbarnama'', the Rishis were the most respected class of people in the Kashmir Valley. They were known for their religious tolerance, planting fruit-bearing trees for public benefit, and abstaining from meat and marriage.

His most famous disciple was Baba Payam ud Din Reshi who was directed by Sakhi Zain ud-Din to visit and learn from Baba Shukur ud-Din Wali. To make Baba Rishi persevere, Baba Shukur ud-Din told him to get water from Wular Lake daily, then atop Sharikot Hill for 2 years. After his training was complete, Baba Shukur ud-Din Rishi sent him back to Sakhi Zain ud-Din Wali and instructed Baba Payam ud Din Reshi to meditate at Tangmarg, near the famous tourist spot Gulmarg.

== Death ==
Baba Shukur ud-Din Wali passed away on 870 A.H/1465 A.D and was laid to rest in a grave he had dug for himself. He is buried atop the Sharikot Hill, overlooking Wular Lake.
