= Dehat Bibi =

Female disciple of Nund Rishi (Kashmir)

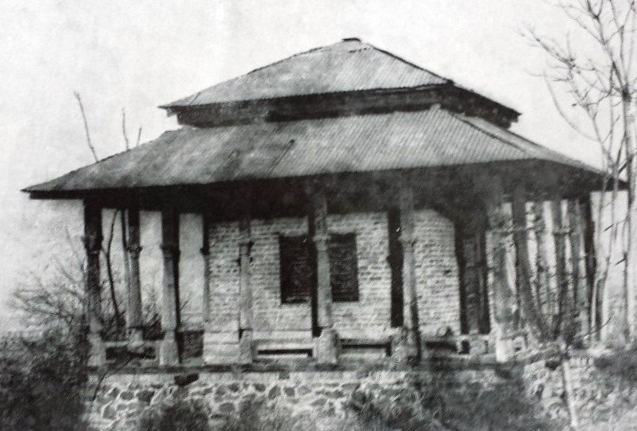
- Tomb of Dehat and Behat Bibi in Zalsu Kashmir
- Born: Kashmir
- Died: Kashmir
- Other names: Dehat Ded, Tsat'a Kori
- Era: Shah Mir era
- Known for: Female disciple of Sheikh Noor-ud-din Wali
- Relatives: Behat Bibi (sister)

Dehat Bibi, also Dehat Ded, was a disciple of Sheikh Noor-Ud-Din (Nund Reshi), the patron saint of Kashmir. She along with her sister Behat Bibi are sometimes referred as Tsat'a Kori, literally girl disciples or girl students of Nund Reshi. Behat Bibi and Dehat Bibi were daughters of a Kashmiri Pandit who was a village patwari by profession and had converted to Islam under the influence of the Sufi saint.

The exalted state of their spirituality and the depth and breadth of their knowledge is testified by the fact that the two girls became the only known female khalifas of Nund Reshi. They are both buried at a village named Zalsu, a few miles from the village of Tsaar (Chrar Sharif) in the valley of Kashmir. The two sisters were present at a meeting that took place between Sheikh Noor-Ud-Din and the proselytizer Saiyed Muhammad Hamadani. The presence of two female disciples in such an important meeting confirms that they were regarded highly by the Reshi.

When Hamadani saw the physically weak Reshi, he remarked that he (Nund Reshi) should not keep his horse (his body) in such a weak condition. To that, Reshi replied that to control once "nafas" (physical needs) was very important because otherwise just like a well-fed horse it could become unmanageable. Dehat Bibi is said to have remarked, "Those who have already reached their destination or goal do not need a ride or a whip." To this, Saiyed Hamadani is supposed to have asked her, who did she think had reached that goal? Dehat Bibi is said to have replied, "Those who have liberated themselves from the clutches of self." When asked if she was a girl or a boy, Dehat Bibi’s answer was simple yet filled with such profound depth that it left everyone speechless; "If I am non-existent (neest in the Persian language) then I am neither a girl nor a boy; but if I am existent (hast in Persian), then I am nothing."
