= Behat Bibi =

Female disciple of Nund Rishi (Kashmir)

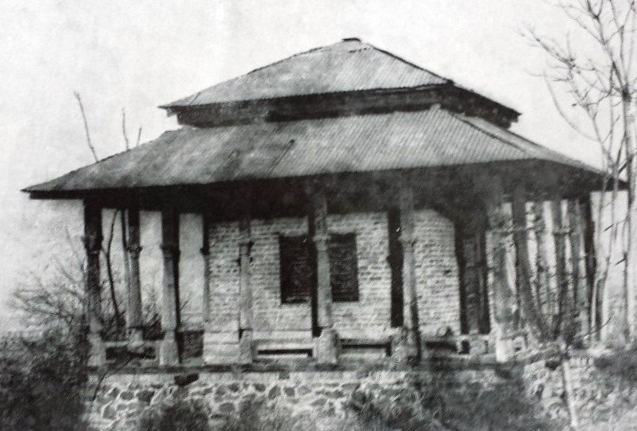
- Tomb of Dehat and Behat Bibi in Zalsu Kashmir
- Born: Kashmir
- Died: Kashmir
- Other names: Behat Ded, Tsat'a Kori
- Era: Shah Mir era
- Known for: Female disciple of Sheikh Noor-ud-din Wali
- Relatives: Dehat Bibi (sister)

Behat Bibi, also known as Behat Ded, was a disciple of Sheikh Noor-Ud-Din (Nund Reshi), the patron Saint of Kashmir. She along with her sister Dehat Bibi are sometimes referred as Tsat'a Kori, literally girl disciples or girl students of Nund Reshi. Behat Bibi and Dehat Bibi were daughters of a Kashmiri Pundit who was a village patwari by profession and had converted to Islam under the influence of the great Sufi saint.

The exalted state of their spirituality, the depth and breadth of their knowledge are testified by the fact that the two girls became the only known female khalifas of Nund Reshi. They are both buried at a village named Zalsu, a few miles from the village of Tsar (Chrar Sharif) in the valley of Kashmir. The two sisters were present at a meeting that took place between Sheikh Noor-Ud-Din and the great proselytizer Saiyed Muhammad Hamadani. The presence of two female disciples in such an important meeting confirms the fact that they were regarded highly by the great Reshi.

It is said that when Hamadani saw the physically weak Reshi, he remarked that he (Nund Reshi) should not keep his horse (his body) in such a weak condition. To this the great Reshi replied that to control once "nafas" (physical needs) was very important because otherwise just like a well-fed horse it could become unmanageable. Dehat Bibi is said to have remarked, "Those who have already reached their destination or goal do not need a ride or a whip." To this Saiyed Hamadani is supposed to have asked her, who did she think had reached that goal? Dehat Bibi is said to have replied, "Those who have liberated themselves from the clutches of self." When asked if she was a girl or a boy, Dehat Bibi's answer was simple yet filled with such profound depth that it left everyone speechless; "If I am non-existent (neest in Persian) then I am neither a girl nor a boy; but if I am existent (hast in Persian) then I am nothing." Among Behat Bibi's many sayings are the following:

1. Salvation from hope and fear lies in annihilating the self.
2. One who destroys one's ego is relieved of the sorrows of one's existence.
