= Baba Naseeb-ud-Din Ghazi =

Sufi poet in Jammu and Kashmir

Baba Naseeb Ud Din Ghazi Sufi
- بابا نَصیٖب الدّین غٲزی
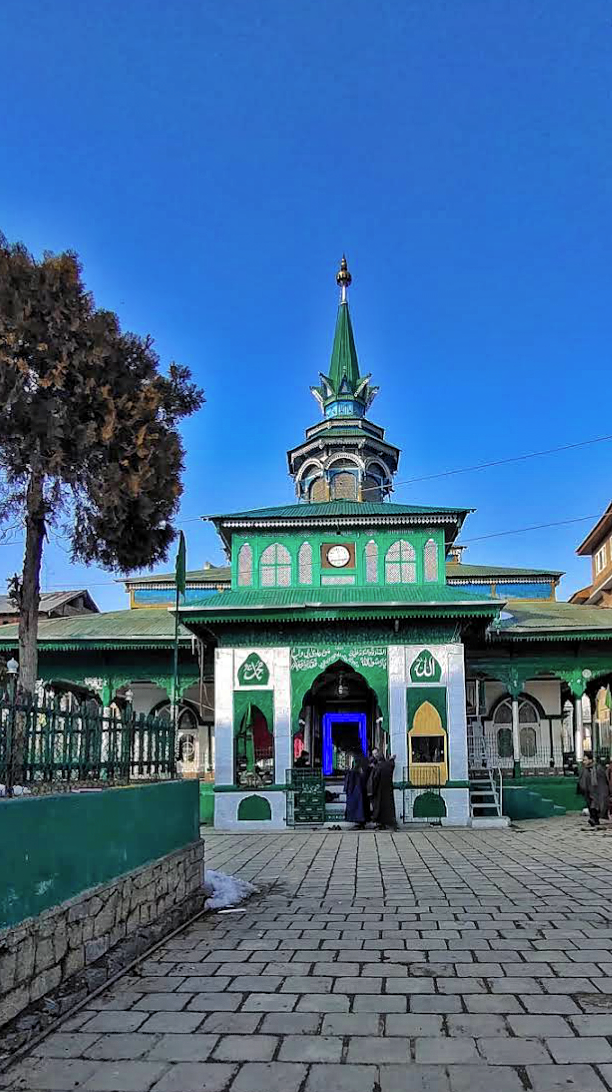
- Title: اَبوْالّفُقرا (Abul-Fuqra)

Personal life
- Born: 1558 (965 AH)
- Died: 6 June 1637 (13 Muharram 1047 AH)
- Resting place: Bijbehara33.654°N 75.157°E
- Parents: Mir Hassan Razi (father); Jameelah Bibi (mother)
- Era: Shah Mir era
- Pen name: Naseeb or Miskin
- Relatives: Shaikh Shams-Ud-Din (Maternal Brother) 'Baba' Shaikh Shams-Ud-Din (Brother)

Religious life
- Religion: Islam
- Denomination: Sunni
- Tariqa: Suhrawardiyya

Muslim leader
- Disciples: Syed Ali Allauddin Khansahib Bukhari, Baba Khalil, Pir Ali Shah Kashmiri, Suha Rishi
- Influenced by: Mir Sayyid Ali Hamadani, Hamza Makhdoom, Sheikh Ul Alam, Baba Dawood Khaki

Nassar-Ud-Din, popularly known as Baba Naseeb-ud-Din Ghazi (Kashmiri: بابا نَصیٖب الدیٖن غٲزی), was a Sufi teacher, follower of Suhrawardiyya order poet and writer born in Srinagar who traveled extensively. He is also called by the title of "Abul-Fuqra" (father of all faqirs) and he was the khalifa of renowned Sufi saint Baba Dawood-i-Khaki.

== Early life ==
He was from Rawalpindi and came with his father Mir Hassan Razi to Kashmir. At the age of 7 years he went to Sultan ul Arifeen Sheikh Hamza Makhdoom for attaining spiritual teachings and became his disciple, later Makhdoom handed over Baba Naseeb to Pir Baba Dawood Khaki.

== Career ==
Baba Naseeb was an able Persian and Kashmiri writer. During preaching of Islam Baba Naseeb Ud Din Ghazi visited most inaccessible areas that time which include, Tibet, Iskardu, Karnah, Dardistan, Baltistan, Kishtwar, Doda, Baderwah, Poonch, Rajouri, Nowshera, Budgam, (Chewdara) etc. He constructed 1200 mosques and bathrooms, musafir khanas, bridges and planted trees on both sides of the roads wherever he went to apprise people about the teaching Islam. By promoting the construction and playing role in missionary, he gained the title of "Ghazi". The title of "Naseeb" he had adopted for himself (sometimes he used Miskin, Nasib Kashmiri). There used to remain a large gathering of people there, that is why he was famous among the people with the patronymic filial of "Abul fuqara"-the father of faqirs.

Baba Naseeb Ud Din Ghazi and several disciples the famous among them are, Sheikh Momin, Haaj Baba, Baba Abdullah Guzaryali, Mohammed Amin Sofi, Mula Zehri Kashmiri, Khawaja Mohammed Amin Gazi, Mulla Tayub Tahiri, etc.

== Books ==
According to reports, Baba Naseeb Ud Din Ghazi has written about 22 books mostly in Arabic and Persian.

- Noor Namah (Biography of Nund Rishi in Persian language).
- Reshi Namah.

== Death ==
Abul Fuqra died on 13 Muharram 1047 (AH) and was buried in the town of old Bijbehara, Kashmir. His annual Urs is being observed on 13th Muharram. His tomb is located in Baba Mohallah, which is structurally in square.

== See also ==
- Abdul Qadir Gilani
- Mir Sayyid Ali Hamadani
- Hamza Makhdoom
- Baba Haneef Ud Din Reshi
