= Resh Mir Sàeb =

Kashmir saint

Resh Mir Sàeb, Baba Hyder Reshi Reshi Maloo
- Born: Hyder Reshi; Dantar, Anantnag, Kashmir
- Died: 1504 CE; Anantnag

Baba Hyder Reshi also known as Baba Hardi Rishi, Harda Reshi, Resh Mir Sahib, Resh Moul Sahib, Reshi Maloo, and Reshi Maol (born 17 January 1504 in Dantar, Tehsil Anantnag, Kashmir), but popularly known as Resh Mir Sàeb, is a venerated saint in Kashmir and regarded as the last giant of the Reshi order of Saints. His shrine is visited by both Hindus and Muslims alike. Reshi Maloo was born in the family of a blacksmith but he possessed and exhibited miraculous powers from childhood. A prolific scholar and spiritual preacher, Resh Mir Sàeb adhered to the Reshi sect of mystics.

== Shrine ==
The shrine of Resh Mir Sahib is an example of Ethnic Kashmiri Architecture and is a place of pilgrimage for Kashmiris of all communities. It is located in the Heart of Anantnag. The shrine, in addition to the structure itself, includes a sulfur spring and a large mosque for prayer. Besides the main Shrine, there are countless other shrines of the saint located at many places in South Kashmir. There was an attempt to set ablaze the shrine located in Dabrun on 12 October 2012.

== See also ==
- Nund Rishi
- Hamza Makhdoom
- Rishi order
- Lal Ded
