= Zain ud-Din Wali =

Kashmiri Saint

Wali Zain ud-Din Wali
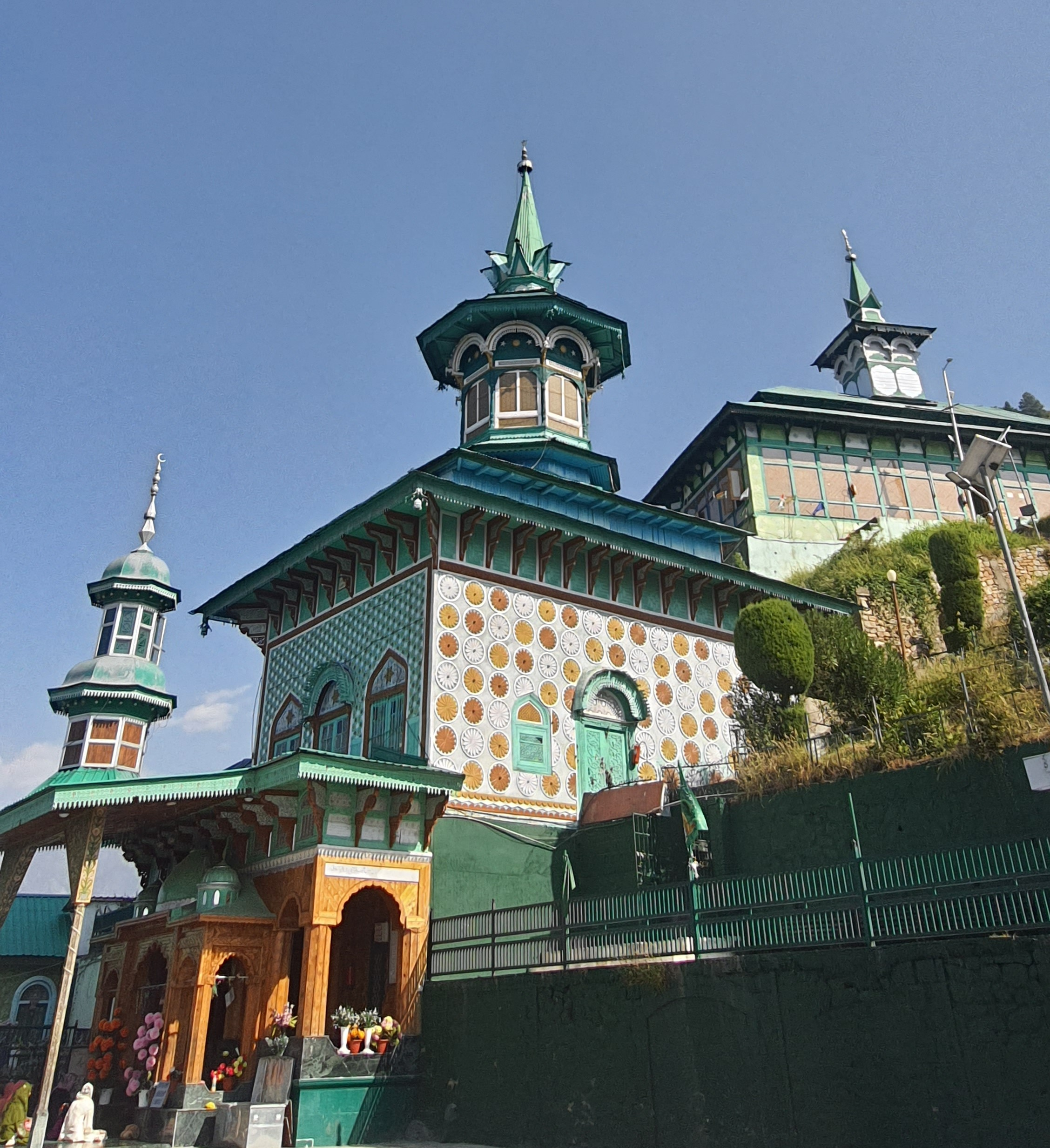
- Ziyarat Sharif Sakhi Zain ud-Din Wali at Aishmuquam

Personal life
- Born: Zia Singh Kishtwar
- Died: 1448 A.D Aishmuquam
- Resting place: Ziyarat Sharif Zain ud-Din Wali, Aishmuquam

Religious life
- Religion: Islam
- Tariqa: Rishi order

Muslim leader
- Disciples: Baba Payam ud Din Reshi, Baba Shukur ud-Din Wali
- Influenced by: Nund Rishi

Zain ud-Din Wali (born Zia Singh d.1448 A.D) was a Kashmiri Sufi saint associated with the Rishi Sufi order, one of the most prominent disciples of Sheikh Noor ud-Din Wali. He is widely referred by the name "Sakhi" meaning "The Generous".

== Life ==
Sakhi Zain ud-Din wali was born in Kishtwar and belonged to the lineage of the rulers of Kishtwar. One day Zia Singh (Zain ud-Din) fell very ill and when no one could cure him, the great Sheikh Noor ud-Din appeared in Kishtwar and told Zia's mother that if they converted to Islam and visited Kashmir, Noor ud-Din would pray for her son and he will soon recover, she promised and Zia was cured but she forgot to fulfill her promise and Zia fell ill again. one day she saw a dream which reminded her of her promise, so she set out to Kashmir and accepted Islam and Zia Singh converted to Zain ud-Din and was initiated by Sheikh Noor ud-Din to the Rishi order.

Zain ud-Din served his Murshid sincerely for many years until Sheikh Noor ud-Din ordered him to move to Aishmuquam. Zain ud-Din moved and settled in a cave in Aishmuquam and gathered a following there. He applied himself to the life of celibacy and simplicity as taught by Sheikh Noor ud-Din.

It s said Zain ud-Din was exiled to Tibet due to the displeasure of then Sultan of Kashmir Zayn al-Abidin the Great. It is said during The Sultan's visit to Aishmuquam, Sakhi Zain ud-Din received him with little attention, the sultan was displeased and asked him to leave his kingdom and so Sakhi Zain ud-Din did with some of his disciples and was welcomed into Tibet but later he was accused to be the cause of the king's death and people became hostile to him. Once the Sultan got boil on his foot and the Sultan asked help from Haji Adham, Haji Adham told The Sultan that he is suffering from the displeasure of Zain ud-Din. So the sultan asked him to come back and after a warm welcome to Zain ud-Din, Zayn al-Abidin the Great recovered.

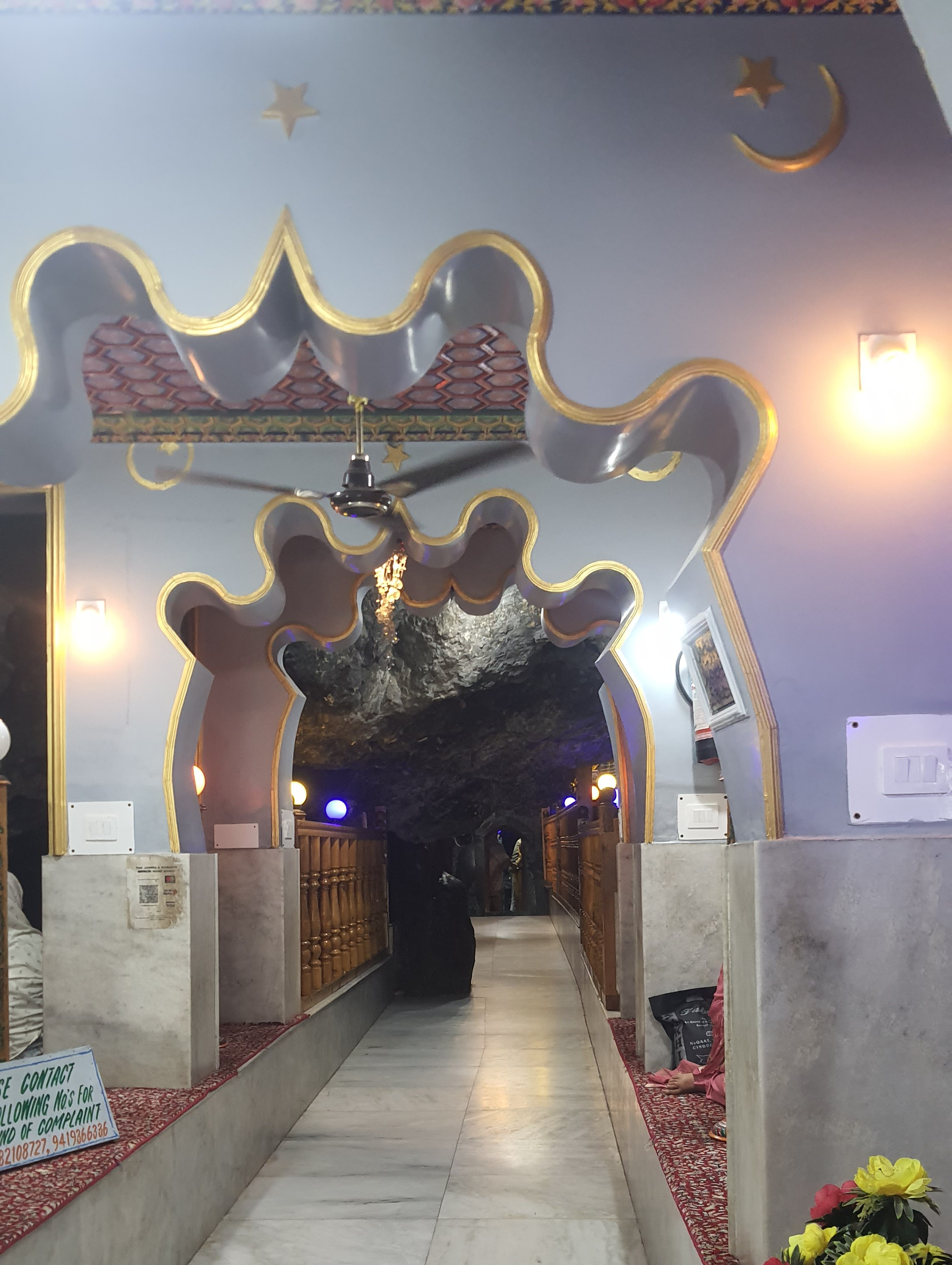
Entrance to the cave of Zain ud-Din at Aishmuqam.

== Spiritual life ==
Zain ud—Din certainly held an important position among the disciples of Sheikh Noor ud-Din. Notably, he chose a cave on the slope of the mountain at Aishmuquam for his worship. His deep devotion and strict discipline impressed even his master, who praised the spiritual excellence of his disciple in the following verse:

My Zaina is the fountain-head of nectar; Such is his devotion to God that he surpasses his preceptor.

According to Bābā Naṣīb, Zain ud—Din introduced a special dress for the Rishis, called the Rishi-jama. He believed that Zain ud—Din had seen this kind of dress worn by the pilgrims (hajjis) in Mecca. In Wahāb's Futūḥāt-i-Kubrāwya, this dress is briefly mentioned in the life story of Shams ud-Din, one of Zain ud—Din's disciples. It is described as “a woolen cloak with mixed colours, woven in a black and white pattern.”

Zain ud-Din expressed his spiritual insight through a symbolic act: he recited Fatiha at the grave of a frog that he had buried after accidentally crushing it under his feet. Through this act, Zain ud-Din revealed his deep awareness of the unity between his own life and the wider order of creation.

== Disciples ==
Some of the most prominent disciples of Sakhi Zain ud-Din Wali were Baba Payam ud Din Reshi, Baba Shukur ud-Din Wali, Avtar Thakur,Baba Shams ud-Din, Hanif ud-Din, Darya ud-Din, Lida Mal Rishi.

== Death ==
Before his death, Zain ud-Din made a will asking that after the funeral rites his body should be placed in a tabut and kept in one corner of the cave. His disciples followed his instructions. However, later they discovered that his body was missing from the tabut. One night, after the body had disappeared, one of his disciples saw him in a dream saying that a grave should be made in his name at that place where they kept the tabut.

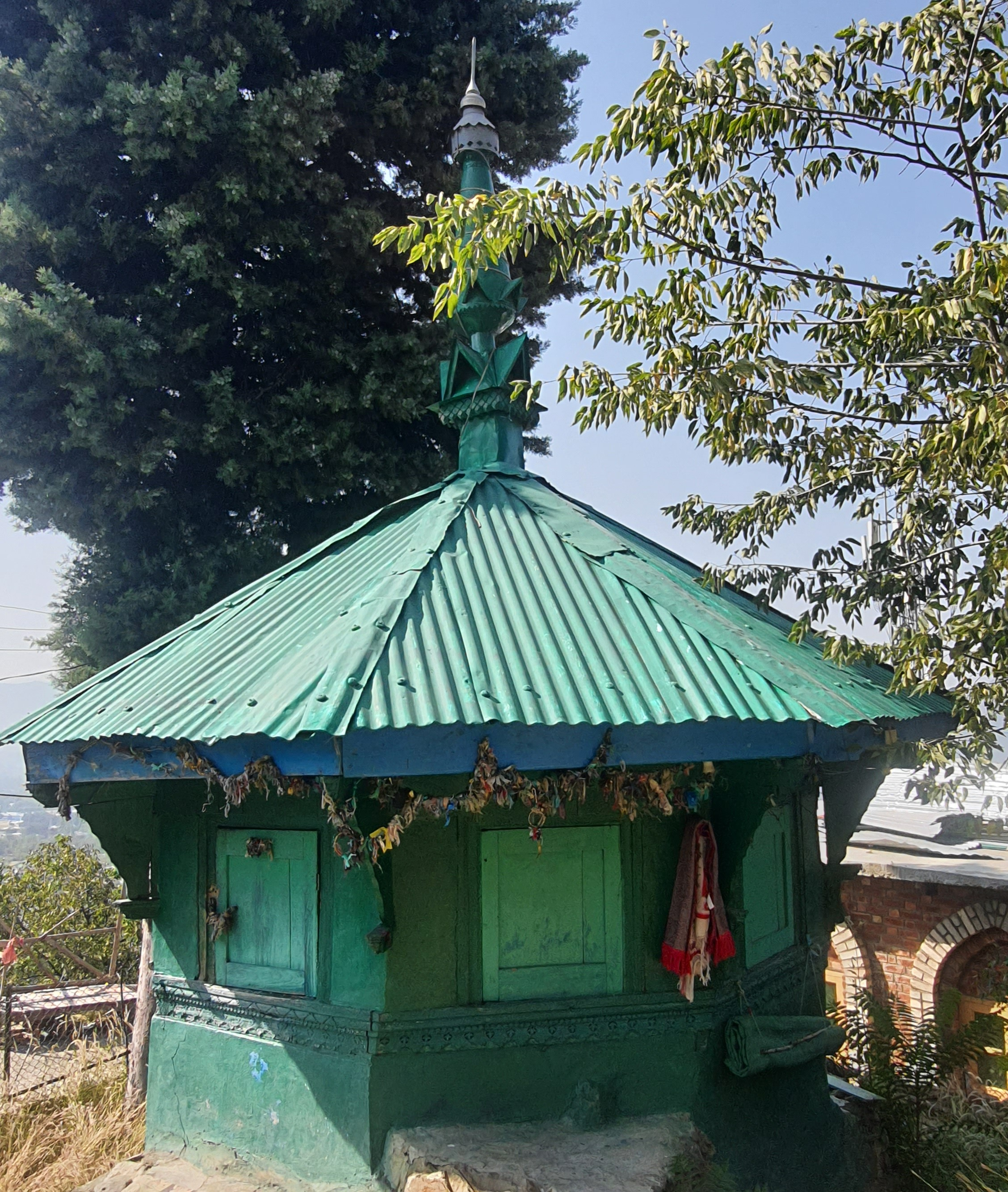
Zain ud-Din's last rites were done here.

Abu’l-Fazl also appears to have been deeply impressed by this story. He writes that Zain ud-Din lived in this cell at Aishmuquam for twelve years. Near the end of his life, he sealed the entrance of the cell with a large stone and never came out again, and no one has ever found any trace of him since.
