= Shafi Shauq =

Padma Shri award winning Kashmiri writer

Shafi Shauq (born 18 March 1950) is Kashmiri poet, writer, and linguist. A recipient of Padma Shri and the Sahitya Akademi Award, he is an academic primarily recognized for his word regarding Kashmiri language and literature.

== Early life and education ==
Shafi Shauq was born in 1950 in Kaprin village in the Shopian district of Jammu and Kashmir, India. He completed his doctoral studies in English and obtained a Ph.D. degree.

== Academic career ==
Shauq served on the faculty of the University of Kashmir for over three decades. During his tenure he taught literature and was associated with academic projects. He retired in 2010 as the Dean of the Faculty of Arts.

== Literary work ==
Shafi Shauq’s body of work includes poetry, fiction, translation, literary criticism and language studies. He has authored, edited and translated numerous books in multiple languages. His publications include works on the Kashmiri language such as dictionaries and grammar manuals, as well as literary texts.

Some of his authored works referenced in public bibliographic sources include Kaeshur Lugaat (a Kashmiri dictionary) and Keeshryuk Grammar, among others. His work encompasses original literary writing and translation of texts.

== Awards and recognition ==
- Sahitya Akademi Award (2006) for collection of Kashmiri poems Yaad Aasmanan Hinz.
- Sahitya Akademi Translation Award
- Padma Shri (2026) in the field of literature and education

== Works ==
- Keeshryuk Grammar
- Keeshur Lugaat (Kashmiri Dictionary)
- Kaeshir Zaban ti Adibuk Tawaariekh (History of the Kashmiri Language and Literature)
- Yaad Aasmanan Hinz (Collection of poems)
