= Rishi order =

Native Sufi saint order of Kashmir

The Rishi order is a religious tradition, concept for the mystical teaching or spiritual practices associated with religious harmony of Sufism in the Kashmir Valley. The Sufi saints of the Rishi order influenced Kashmiris and its culture. The prominent Rishis of the valley include Resh Mir Sàeb and Nund Rishi, also known as Sheikh Noor-ud-din Wali. The Rishi order has made an important contribution to Kashmiriyat, the ethnic, national, social and cultural consciousness of the Kashmiri people, as well as a distinctive contribution to global Islam.

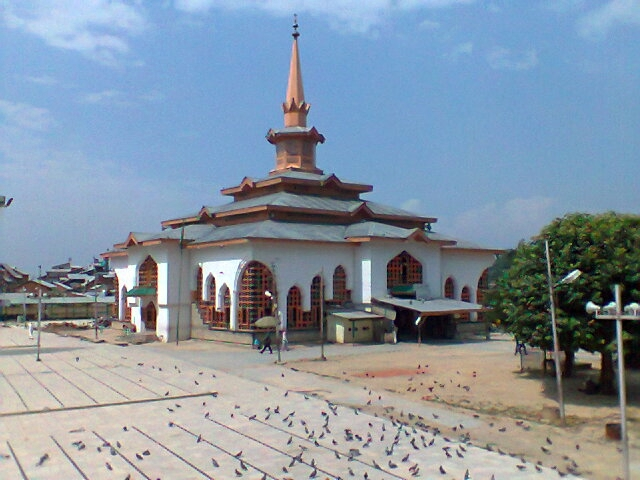
Shrine of Sufi Nund Rishi

The 17th-century poet Baba Nasib sums up the impact of the Rishi order thus: "The candle of religion is lit by the Rishis, they are the pioneers of the path of belief. The heart-warming quality of humble souls emanates from the inner purity of the hearts of the Rishis. This vale of Kashmir, that you call a paradise, owes a lot of its charm to the traditions set in vogue by the Rishis."

== Overview ==
The original Rishi Sufis were focused on seclusion and emphasis on meditation. They were ascetics involved in the abstinence from worldly pleasure. In his memoirs, Jahangir says that "they possess simplicity and are without pretence. They abuse no one. They restrain the tongue of desire and the foot of seeking. They eat no flesh, they have no wives and always plant fruit bearing trees in the fields so that men may benefit by them, themselves desiring no advantage. There are about 2,000 of these people."

In recent years, the history of the Rishi order has attracted interest from scholars such as Mohammad Ishaq Khan.

== Notable Rishi Saints ==
=== Nund Rishi ===
Nund Rishi was one of the founding figures of the Rishi order known by names like Sheikh Ul-Alam (Spiritual Master of the World) and Alamdar-e-Kashmir (flag bearer of Kashmir), he integrated parts of other traditions like the non-dual school Kashmir Shaivism, also known as Trika Shaivism and elements of Buddhism into Sufism and created The Rishi order. His poems are at the center of the Rishi Movement and his philosophy of love, compassion and simplicity are at the centre of this Sufi order.

=== Baba Bamuddin Rishi ===
Baba Bamuddin Rishi (d. 1440 A.D) was a prominent Sufi saint and the first khalifa (spiritual successor) of The Rishi order and Nund Rishi, the founder of the Rishi order in Kashmir. Born as Bama Sadhi in a Hindu Brahmin family in Bamzu, near Matan in Anantnag district, Baba Bamuddin Rishi was initially a priest dedicated to idol worship. His life took a transformative turn upon meeting Nund Rishi, who guided him towards monotheism and the rejection of idol worship. Impressed by the Sheikh's wisdom and spiritual insight, Bama Sadhi embraced Islam and was renamed Baba Bamuddin Rishi.

The elders of the Rishi Movement after heir consultations appointed Saint Baba Bam-ud-Din (RA), as their first vicegerent (deputy) just after the death of their greatest Mentor (RA). He, while in Bumzoo (Mattan) as his sub-centre managed the whole affairs of the organization.

=== Sakhi Zain ud-Din Wali ===
Sakhi Zain al-Din Wali was one of the main disciples of Nund Rishi who meditated in Aishmuquam by the orders of Nund Rishi. He was the second spiritual successor of Nund Rishi and The Rishi order after Baba Bamuddin Rishi. Zayn al-Abidin the Great had exiled Sakhi Zain al-Din Wali to Tibet but was later welcomed back by Zayn al-Abidin the Great on the advice of Haji Adham. Sakhi Zain al-Din Wali was a Hindu Rajput prince but Nund Rishi converted Zain al-din to Islam. After becoming Muslim, he led a simple life in Aishmuquam and was known for his generosity. He is considered one of the most prominent Sufis in the fold of the Rishi order.

=== Baba Latif ad-Din Rishi ===
Baba Latif ad-Din Rishi, originally known as Laddi Sen, was a Rajput chieftain from Kishtwar, Jammu. He embraced Islam after meeting Nund Rishi, becoming one of his chief disciples. Renamed Baba Latif ad-Din Rishi, he led an ascetic life, subsisting on wild grasses, and is revered for his spiritual teachings and dedication to the Sufi path. He was the third spiritual successor of Nund Rishi and The Rishi order after Baba Bamuddin Rishi and Sakhi Zain al-Din.

=== Baba Nasruddin Rishi ===
Baba Nasr ud-Din Rishi was a prominent Kashmiri Sufi saint and the fourth principal disciple (khalifa) of Hazrat Sheikh Noor-ud-Din Noorani or Nund Rishi, the founder of the Rishi order in Kashmir. Born into a wealthy family in Sazipur, Yechpargana, Baba Nasruddin served as the manager of the langar (community kitchen) at Charar-e-Sharif, where he practiced extreme austerities, such as fasting on wild grasses and breaking his fast with ashes mixed with water. When Nund Rishi learned of these practices, he instructed Baba Nasruddin to moderate his asceticism and consume rice instead. He was the fourth spiritual successor of Nund Rishi and The Rishi order after Baba Bamuddin Rishi, Zain ud-Din Wali and Baba Latif ad-Din Rishi.

=== Baba Shukur-ud-Din Wali ===
Baba Shukur ud-Din Wali was a revered Kashmiri Sufi saint, known for his deep spirituality and good deeds. He was born during the reign of Sultan Qutub Din and exhibited signs of piety from a young age. His spiritual journey began when two pious men advised his mother to reduce the amount of food she carried to him and to recite a Quranic verse before feeding him. This guidance led to significant changes in his life.

Baba Shukur-ud-Din Wali sought spiritual enlightenment at the hands of Hazrat Sheikh Noor-ud-Din Noorani or Nund Rishi in Charar-e-Sharief, where he met the founder of the Rishi order. He later studied under Sakhi Zain al-Din Wali in Aishmuquam. Following his training, he meditated in a cave atop Sharkot Hill near Wular Lake, where he spent the remainder of his life in solitude. He died in 870 AH (1465 CE).

=== Baba Payam ud Din Reshi ===
Baba Payam ud Din Reshi, also known as Baba Reshi, was a revered 15th-century Sufi saint from Kashmir. Born in 1411 CE in Chander-nau-gaon, near Ganderbal, he was the son of a nobleman serving in the court of Sultan Zain-ul-Abidin. Initially living a life of luxury, Baba Reshi experienced a spiritual awakening after observing ants diligently gathering food for the winter, prompting him to contemplate the transient nature of worldly possessions and the importance of the afterlife.

Motivated by this reflection, he renounced his wealth and status, he went to Nund Rishi for guidance and was sent to train with Baba Shukur-ud-Din Wali who told him to get water from Wular Lake to the top of Sharikot Hill for 2 years, after his training with Baba Shukur ud-Din Wali was done, he directed him to go to Sakhi Zain al-Din Wali for further training in Aishmuquam. After completing his spiritual training, Baba Reshi was directed by Sakhi Zain al-Din Wali to move to Ramboh village in Baramulla district, where he dedicated himself to prayer and meditation, attracting followers with his piety and wisdom. He spent the remainder of his life in the forested area near Tangmarg, dying in 1480 CE.

== Relationship with Hinduism ==
Hindus seek to understand themselves and love God which is the same end goal of Sufism. Nund Rishi and Lal Ded, both Sufi and Shaivite saints criticised idol worshipping, orthodox religious practices, eating meat, they insisted that all religions are equal and believed God was one. Kashmiris use the traditional epithet Rishi to describe these saints. The Shaivite yogini Lal Ded was a key influence on Nund Rishi, and is said to have suckled him at her breast when he was an infant. Sufi Rishis were certainly aware of yogic practices, as evidenced by the poet Shams Faqir's praise of Lal Ded: "Lalla achieved the fusion of her vital air and ether, and thus realized God."
