= Nasr ud-Din Rishi =

Kashmiri Sufi saint and fourth khalifa of Nund Rishi (14th–15th century)

Hazrat Baba Nasr ud-Din Rishi

Personal life
- Born: Vitar / Nusar / Avtar (pre-conversion name, per tradition) c. late 14th century Sazipur, Yechpargana, Kashmir
- Died: c. early–mid 15th century Charar-e-Sharif, Kashmir
- Resting place: Shrine complex at Charar-e-Sharif, Budgam district, Jammu and Kashmir
- Known for: Fourth principal khalifa of Nund Rishi; manager of the langar at Charar-e-Sharif; extreme asceticism

Religious life
- Religion: Islam
- Denomination: Sunni Islam
- Order: Rishi order

Muslim leader
- Teacher: Sheikh Noor-ud-Din Noorani (Nund Rishi)

Baba Nasr ud-Din Rishi (نصر الدين ريشي; also romanised Baba Nasruddin Rishi; fl. late 14th – early 15th century) was a Kashmiri Sufi saint and the fourth principal khalifa (spiritual successor) of Hazrat Sheikh Noor-ud-Din Noorani, founder of the Rishi order in the Kashmir Valley. Born into a wealthy Hindu Rajput family in Sazipur, Yechpargana, he converted to Islam following a vision and became one of the most noted ascetics within the Rishi tradition. He was appointed manager of the free community kitchen (langar) at Charar-e-Sharif, where he practiced extreme austerities. His tomb lies within the shrine complex at Charar-e-Sharif, alongside that of his spiritual master.

== Background and early life ==
Nasr ud-Din is described in hagiographic and historical sources as having come from a prosperous Hindu Rajput family of the Rather clan in Sazipur, a village in the Yechpargana region of Kashmir. Prior to his conversion to Islam, he was known by different names in various accounts — Vitar, Nusar, or Avtar — reflecting the uncertainty of the oral tradition surrounding his origins.

According to hagiographic sources, while still a youth he fell gravely ill, and no physician could offer a remedy. One night, during his illness, he had a dream in which he saw Sheikh Noor-ud-Din Noorani seated among a gathering of saints identified as the abdal (a rank of saints in Sufi cosmology). They suggested that he travel to Charar-e-Sharif to seek the Sheikh's blessing if he wished to be cured.

Upon arriving at Charar-e-Sharif with his parents, Nund Rishi gave him food to eat, and he recovered immediately. Overcome with devotion, Nasr ud-Din accepted the Sheikh as his pir (spiritual master), asked his parents to return to their village, and renounced his life of wealth and comfort to follow the Rishi path.

== Spiritual succession in the Rishi order ==
The Rishi order founded by Nund Rishi (c. 1377–1438) had four principal khulafa (pl. of khalifa) who acted as the primary bearers of his spiritual legacy. These four disciples — Baba Bam ud-Din Rishi, Baba Zain ud-Din Rishi (Sakhi Zain al-Din Wali), Baba Latif ud-Din Rishi, and Baba Nasr ud-Din Rishi — were themselves converts from Hinduism, and together helped disseminate the Rishi movement across the Kashmir Valley. Historian Prem Nath Bazaz noted that these key disciples were recent converts to Islam who blended Sanskritic and Islamic motifs in their own practices.

Nund Rishi is reported to have referred to these four disciples in a verse: "Buma, Nasar, Zaina and Latif, these four are pure and beautiful. God has given me a necklace to string these four jewels together. They are from me and I am from them." The succession followed the order: Baba Bamuddin Rishi (first), Sakhi Zain ud-Din Wali (second), Baba Latif ud-Din Rishi (third), and Baba Nasr ud-Din Rishi (fourth and final principal khalifa).

== Role at Charar-e-Sharif ==
Nasr ud-Din Rishi was entrusted by Nund Rishi with the management of the langar (free community kitchen) at Charar-e-Sharif, which served the poor and needy as well as itinerant Rishis and Sufis passing through the shrine. The langar was a defining social institution of the Rishi order — expressing the order's commitment to service, egalitarianism, and care for the poor — and its administration was among the most significant practical responsibilities within the Rishi community.

=== Ascetic practices ===
Sources record that Nasr ud-Din practiced extreme austerities while managing the langar. Two related accounts circulate in the hagiographic tradition. In one version, those who ate at the langar complained to Nund Rishi that while they were fed wild grasses and vegetables by Nasr ud-Din, he himself appeared to drink milk. The Sheikh visited the langar and, picking up Nasr ud-Din's cup, passed it to the complainants; upon drinking, they discovered it contained not milk but white mud mixed with water. In another account, Nasr ud-Din fasted continuously, breaking his fast only with a handful of ashes mixed with water. When Nund Rishi learned of this, he instructed his disciple to moderate his asceticism and to break his fast with a set number of grains of rice each evening — variously reported as eighteen or one hundred.

These practices — extreme fasting and subsistence on minimal or non-edible substances — are consistent with the broader Rishi tradition of bodily austerity, which historian Mohammad Ishaq Khan has linked to both pre-Islamic Kashmiri ascetic (rishi) practices and the Sufi emphasis on renunciation of the nafs (ego/self). The episode in which Nund Rishi counselled moderation is notable: it reflects the pedagogical relationship between master and disciple, and suggests that even extreme piety required guidance and balance within the Rishi order.

== Burial and veneration ==
Baba Nasr ud-Din Rishi is buried within the shrine complex at Charar-e-Sharif, alongside his spiritual master Nund Rishi. The shrine at Charar-e-Sharif is among the most significant sacred sites in the Kashmir Valley, visited by pilgrims of multiple faiths. The co-interment of the disciple with his master is itself a marker of Nasr ud-Din's elevated spiritual status within the Rishi tradition.

== See also ==
- Nund Rishi
- Rishi order
- Charar-e-Sharif
- Kashmiriyat
