= Lalleshwari =

Fourteenth century Kashmiri mystic

- Born: 1320; Pandrethan (present-day Srinagar, Jammu and Kashmir, India)
- Died: 1392 (aged 71–72); Kashmir
- Other names: Lalla, Lalleshwari, Lal Arifa
- Known for: Vatsun poetry

Lalleshwari, (c. 1320–1392) also commonly known as Lal Ded (Kashmiri pronunciation: [laːl dʲad]), was a Kashmiri mystic of the Kashmir Shaivism school of Hindu philosophy. She was the creator of the style of mystic poetry called vatsun or Vakhs, meaning "speech" (from Sanskrit vāc). Known as Lal Vakhs, her verses are among the early compositions in the Kashmiri language and are a part of the history of modern Kashmiri literature.

Lalleshwari ("Mother Lal" or "Mother Lalla") is also known by various other names, including Lal Dyad (Dyad means "Grandmother"), Lalla Aarifa, Lal Diddi, Lalleshwari, Lalla Yogishwari/Yogeshwari and Lalishri.

== Life ==
Most modern scholars place Lalleshwari's birth between 1301 and 1320 C.E., near Sempore or Pandrethan. She is estimated to have died in 1373, and a grave near Bijbehara is attributed to her, although there is no confirmation of this. Lalleshwari is believed to have been born to a Kashmiri Brahmin family, and was married at the age of twelve in accordance with the local customs. Following her marriage, she was renamed, as is custom, to Padmavati, but continued to be known as Lalla or Lalleshwari. Some reports suggest her marriage was unhappy, and that she left home, between the ages of twenty-four and twenty-six, to become a disciple of a spiritual leader, Siddha Srikanth or Sed Boyu, who was a Shaivite. As part of her religious education, she travelled alone on foot, surviving on alms, before becoming a teacher and spiritual leader herself.

Records of Lalleshwari's life are contained in oral tradition, and consequently, there is variance on the details of her life and beliefs. Numerous contemporary Kashmiri histories, such as those prepared by Jonaraja, Srivara, Prajyabhatta, and Haidar Malik Chadura, do not mention Lalleshwari. The first written record of Lalleshwari's life is contained in the Tadhkirat-ul-Arifin (1587), a collection of biographies of saints and religious figures written by Mulla Ali Raina, and followed by an account of her life in Baba Daud Mishkati's Asrar ul-Akbar (1654). In these texts, Lalleshwari is described as a mystic saint who appears in the forest to travellers. In 1736, Khwaja Azam Diddamari's Tarikh-i-Azami contained a more detailed account of Lalleshwari's life. She is also noted in a Persian chronicle, the Waqiati-e-Kashmir (1746) in which she is described as being known in the reign of Sultan Alau-ud-din (1343–54) and died in the reign of Sultan Shihab-ud-din (1354–73).

Lalleshwari is also believed to be a contemporary of Mir Sayyid Ali-Hamdani, an Iranian Sufi scholar and poet who recorded stories of her in his own verse during his travels to Kashmir.

== Influence on Nund Rishi and The Rishi Sufi Order ==
The profound connection between Lalleshwari and Nund Rishi (Sheikh Noor-ud-Din Noorani) is a cornerstone of Kashmir's spiritual and cultural heritage. Their intertwined legacies symbolize the syncretic traditions that have shaped the region's identity.

A widely recounted legend narrates that as an infant, Nund Rishi refused to nurse from his mother. Lalleshwari, upon visiting, addressed the child:

"If you are not ashamed of being born, why are you ashamed of being breastfed?"

Following her words, the child began to nurse, an act interpreted as Lalleshwari imparting spiritual wisdom to Nund Rishi. This anecdote underscores the deep spiritual bond between the two mystics. Both Lalleshwari and Nund Rishi employed vernacular Kashmiri poetic forms ('Vakhs' and 'Shruks') respectively to convey their mystical experiences and teachings. Their verses emphasize themes such as the impermanence of the material world, the importance of self-realization, and the unity of existence. Nund Rishi's poetry often reflects the influence of Lalleshwari's thought, acknowledging her spiritual stature and expressing a desire to attain similar enlightenment, he writes:

That Lalla of Padmanpore,

The one who drank the nectar,

The one who kept gazing at Shiva,

God, give me a gift like that!

The spiritual kinship between Lalleshwari and Nund Rishi symbolizes the harmonious blending of Shaivism and Sufism in Kashmir. Their teachings transcended religious boundaries, fostering a culture of tolerance, compassion, and unity. Their combined legacy laid the foundation for the Rishi order in Kashmir, which emphasizes inner spirituality over external rituals and promotes a universal message of love understanding.

Lalleshwari profoundly shaped the Rishi Sufi Order in Kashmir through her mystic poetry, known as 'Vakhs'. These verses, blending elements of Shaivism and Sufism, emphasized direct personal experience of the divine, transcending ritualistic practices. Her teachings inspired Nund Rishi, who further developed the Rishi order, promoting values of simplicity, equality, and non-violence. Lalleshwari's influence is evident in the Rishi Sufi Order's emphasis on spiritual unity and communal harmony, laying the foundation for a syncretic religious culture in Kashmir.

== Literary works ==
Lalleshwari's poems represent some of the earliest works of Kashmiri literature, written as Kashmiri began to emerge as a distinct language from Apabhramsa Prakrit, which was spoken in North India. A total of 285 poems, known as vakhs, are attributed to Lalleshwari, including the Kashmiri lullaby Hukus Bukus.

Lalleshwari's vakhs drawn from influences and languages that made contact with the Indian sub-continent in her life, drawing from Sanskritic, Islamic and Sufi cultures.

=== Translations ===
Lalleshwari's work were first recorded in writing in the twentieth century, and have been republished since, in Kashmiri as well as in translation. In 1914, Sir George Grierson, a civil servant and the Superintendent of the Linguistic Survey of India, commissioned a copy of Lalleshwari's vakhs. A written record of the vakhs was unavailable at the time, and one was prepared by transcribing an oral narration of the vakhs performed by Dharma-dasa Darwesh, a story-teller residing in Gush, Kashmir. This manuscript was translated in English by Grierson and published as Lalla-Vakyani, or The Wise Sayings of Lal Ded. Grierson consolidated and expanded on the partial translation prepared by the Hungarian-British archaeologist and scholar Sir Marc Aurel Stein, and incorporated some archived poems that were contained in the Dictionary of Kashmiri Proverbs and Sayings (1888).

Grierson's translation was the first printed and published volume of Lalleshwari's works. Following his translation, a number of English translations have been produced, those by Pandit Ananda Koul (1921), Sir Richard Carnac Temple (1924) and Jaylal Kaul (1973). Recent translations include those by Coleman Barks, Jaishree Odin Kak, and Ranjit Hoskote.

Her poems, (vakhs) have been translated into English by Richard Temple, Jaylal Kaul, Coleman Barks, Jaishree Odin, and Ranjit Hoskote.

== Legacy ==
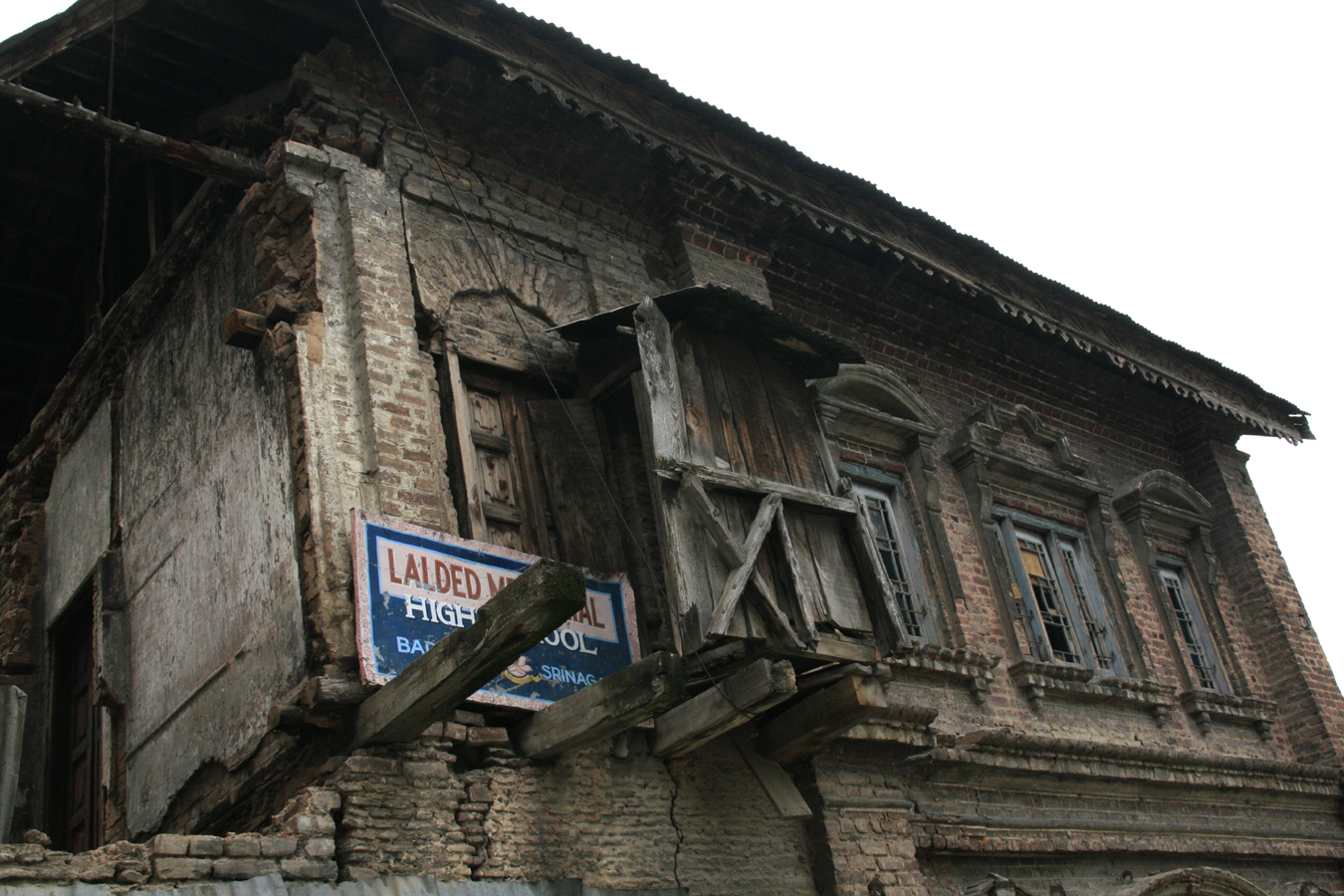
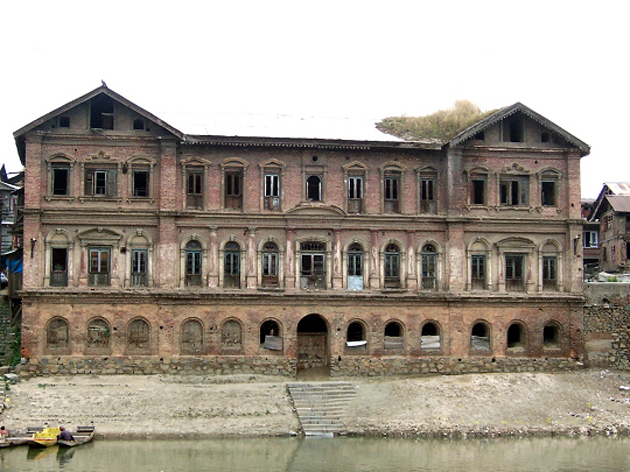
Lal Ded Memorial School in Srinagar, Kashmir

The leading Kashmiri Sufi figure Sheikh Noor-ud-din Wali (also known as Nooruddin Rishi or Nunda Rishi) was influenced by Lalleshwari. He led to the formation of the Rishi order of saints and later gave rise to many Rishi saints like Resh Mir Sàeb. One Kashmiri folk story recounts that, as a baby, Nunda Rishi refused to be breast-fed by his mother. It was Lalleshwari who breast-fed him.

Lalleshwari and her mystic musings continue to have a deep impact on the psyche of Kashmiris, and the 2000 National Seminar on her held at New Delhi led to the release of the book Remembering Lal Ded in Modern Times. In his book "Triadic Mysticism", Paul E. Murphy calls her the "chief exponent of devotional or emotion-oriented Triadism". According to him, three representatives of devotionalism emerged in Kashmir in the five hundred years between the last half of the ninth and the end of the fourteenth centuries.

What this points to is the non-sectarian nature of Lalleshwari's spiritual life and her song-poems. Yet, her life and work have been used for various religious and political agendas over time. As author and poet Ranjit Hoskote writes:

To the outer world, Lal Ded is arguably Kashmir's best known spiritual and literary figure; within Kashmir, she has been venerated both by Hindus and Muslims for nearly seven centuries. For most of that period, she has successfully eluded the proprietorial claims of religious monopolists. Since the 1980s, however, Kashmir's confluential culture has frayed thin under the pressure of a prolonged conflict to which transnational terrorism, State repression and local militancy have all contributed. Religious identities in the region have become harder and more sharp-edged, following a substantial exodus of the Hindu minority during the early 1990s, and a gradual effort to replace Kashmir's unique and syncretically nuanced tradition of Islam with a more Arabocentric global template. It is true that Lal Ded was constructed differently by each community, but she was simultaneously Lallesvari or Lalla Yogini to the Hindus and Lal'arifa to the Muslims; today unfortunately, these descriptions are increasingly being promoted at the expense of one another.

Beyond several new translations of Lalleshwari's vakh, there are other contemporary performative arts that are based on Lalleshwari's life and poetry. For example, there are contemporary renderings of Lalleshwari's poetry in song. In addition, a solo play in English, Hindi, and Kashmiri titled Lal Ded (based on her life) has been performed by actress Mita Vashisht across India since 2004.

In 2007, experimental musician Katie Jane Garside took on the stage name Lalleshwari with the release of her album Lullabies in a Glass Wilderness.

== See also ==
- Habba Khatoon
- Nund Rishi
- Hamza Makhdoom
- Rishi order
