= Baba Reshi =

- Village
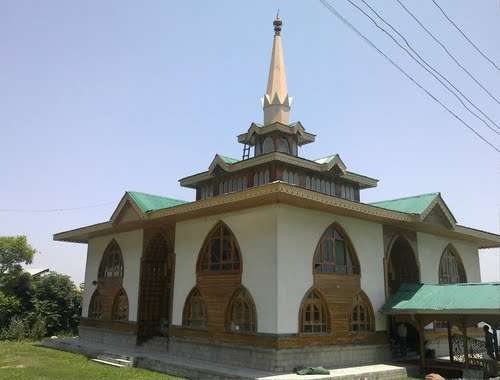
- Baba Reshi Shrine

- Location in Baramulla, Jammu and Kashmir Baba Reshi (India)
- Coordinates: 34°03′32.31″N 74°25′28.17″E
- Country: India
- Union Territory: Jammu and Kashmir
- District: Baramulla
- Elevation: 1,593 m (5,226 ft)

Languages
  - Official: Kashmiri, Urdu, Hindi, Dogri, English
- Time zone: UTC+5:30 (IST)
- PIN: 193402

Baba Reshi is a settlement in Baramulla district of the Indian union territory of Jammu and Kashmir. It is named after the Sufi saint Baba Reshi. It is located about 13 km (8.1 mi) from Gulmarg near the Alpather Lake.

== History ==
Baba Reshi is named after Baba Reshi, a revered 15th-century Sufi saint from Kashmir. He was born as Payam ud-Din in 1411 CE in Chander-nau-gaon, near Ganderbal, and was the son of a nobleman serving in the court of Sultan Zayn al-Abidin. He experienced a spiritual awakening after observing ants diligently gathering food for the winter, prompting him to contemplate the transient nature of worldly possessions and the importance of the afterlife. Motivated by this, he renounced his wealth and status, and went to Nund Rishi for guidance. He was sent to train with Baba Shukur-ud-Din Wali, who tasked him to fetch water from Wular Lake to the top of the Sharikot Hill for almost two years. He later directed him to go to Sakhi Zain al-Din Wali for further training in Aishmuquam. After completing his spiritual training, Baba Reshi moved to Ramboh village in Baramulla district, where he dedicated himself to prayer and meditation, and attracted several followers with his piety and wisdom. He spent the remainder of his life in the forested area near Tangmarg, and died in 1480 CE.

== Baba Reshi Shrine ==
Situated at an altitude of about 7,000 ft (2,100 m), the Baba Reshi shrine is a three-storey monument located at the village. Built-in 1480 CE, in Mughal and Persian style, the Ziyarat shrine and its surrounding garden is a tourist attraction as well as a destination for pilgrims visiting the shrine. This shrine has a large minaret and the Noor Khwan with the grave of the Sufi saint lies inside the building. It is covered with cloth with embroideries depicting calligraphy from Quran. The Noor Khwan is made of glass and wood carvings.

On 2 September 1989, the 300-year-old shrine was gutted in a fire under mysterious circumstances, which caused severe damage to several buildings surrounding the shrine.

The Urs or the anniversary of Baba Payam ud din Reshi is celebrated annually and people from far off places visit the Shrine on the occasion.

There are accommodations for tourists and pilgrims around the shrine. Each building has a Daan or cooking place where the Kashmiris prepare their meals and everyone traditionally contributes some of it to the Langar. The Langar staff distribute the food later in charity.

== gallery ==
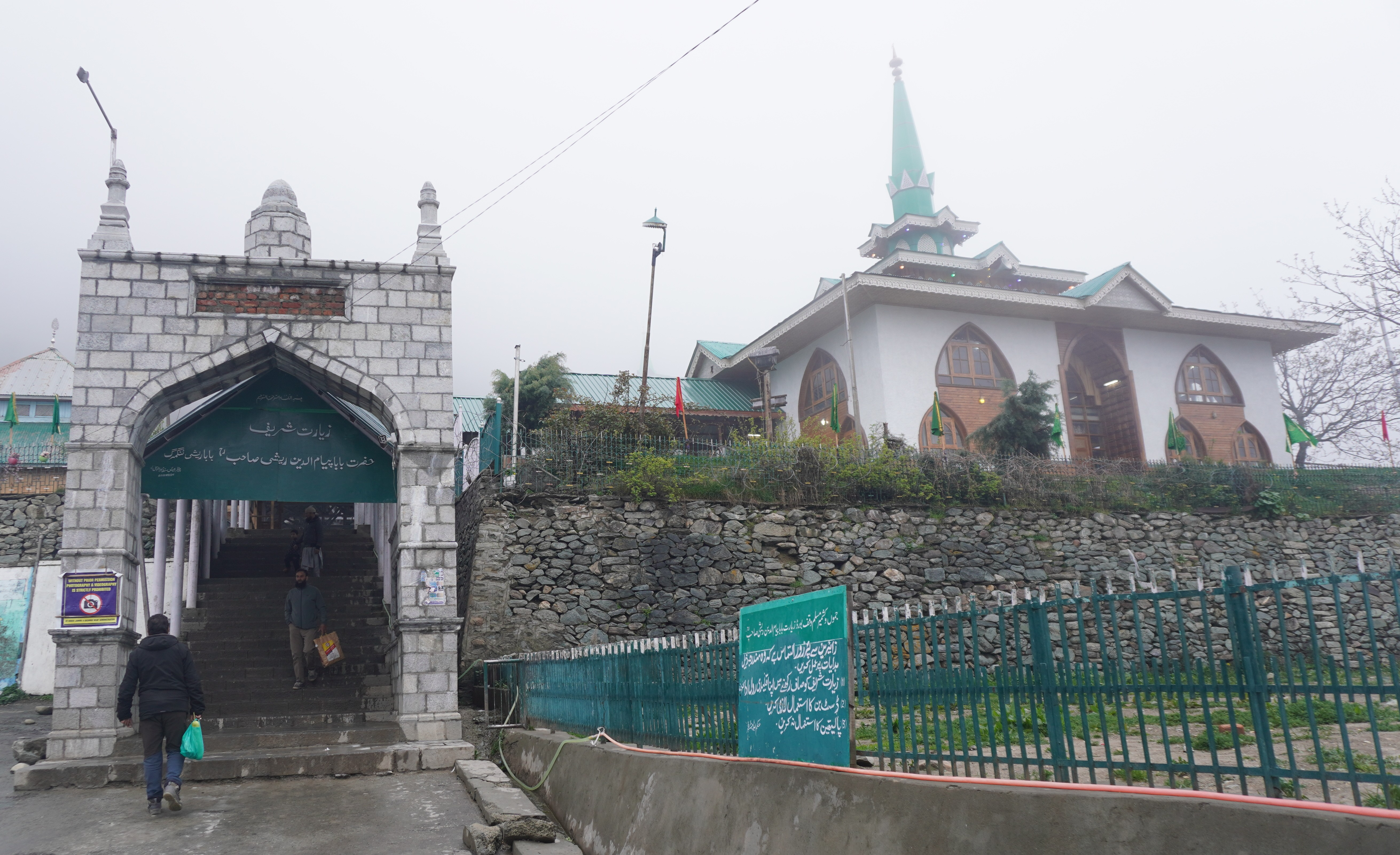
Complex view from outside

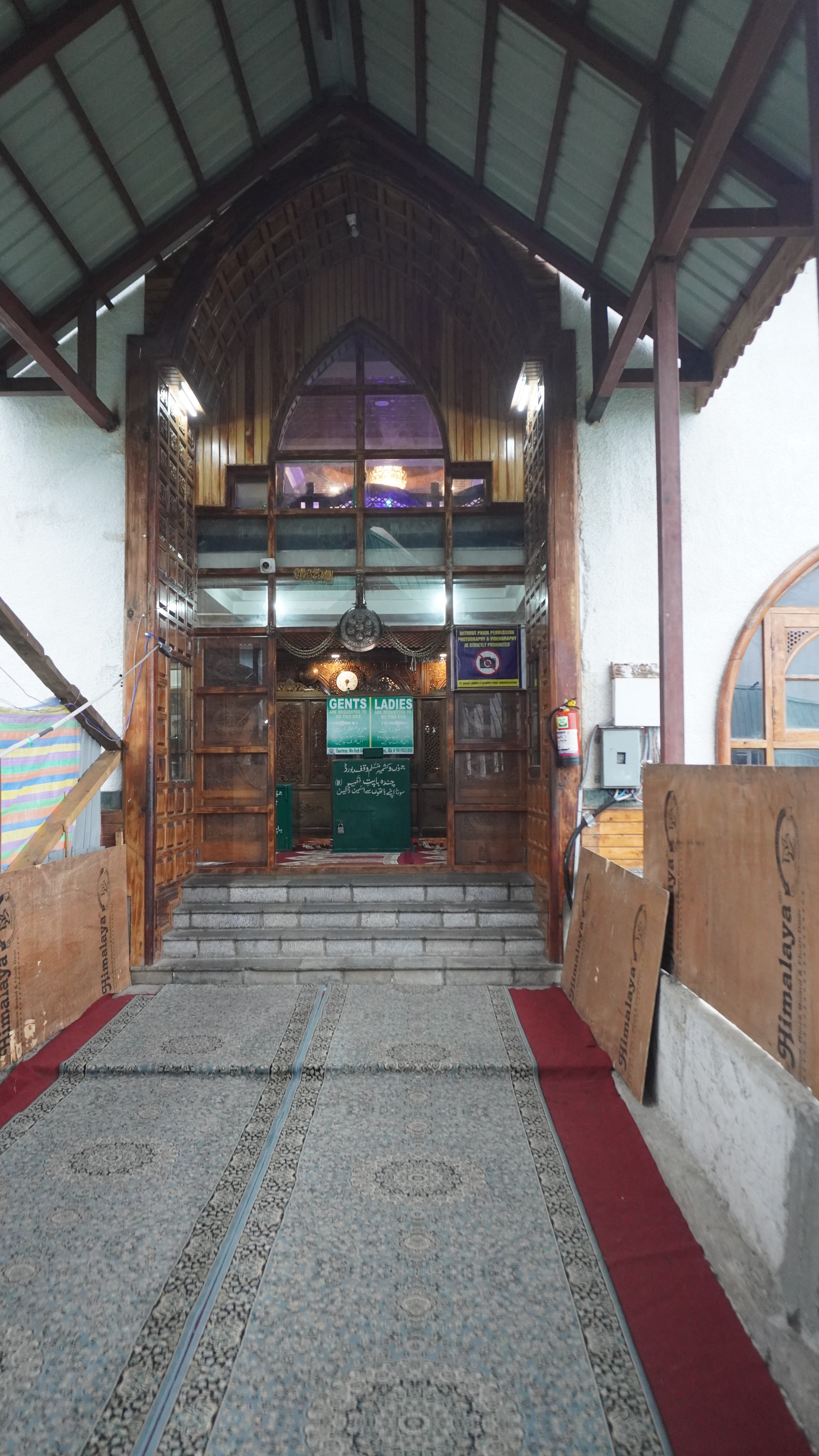
Entrance

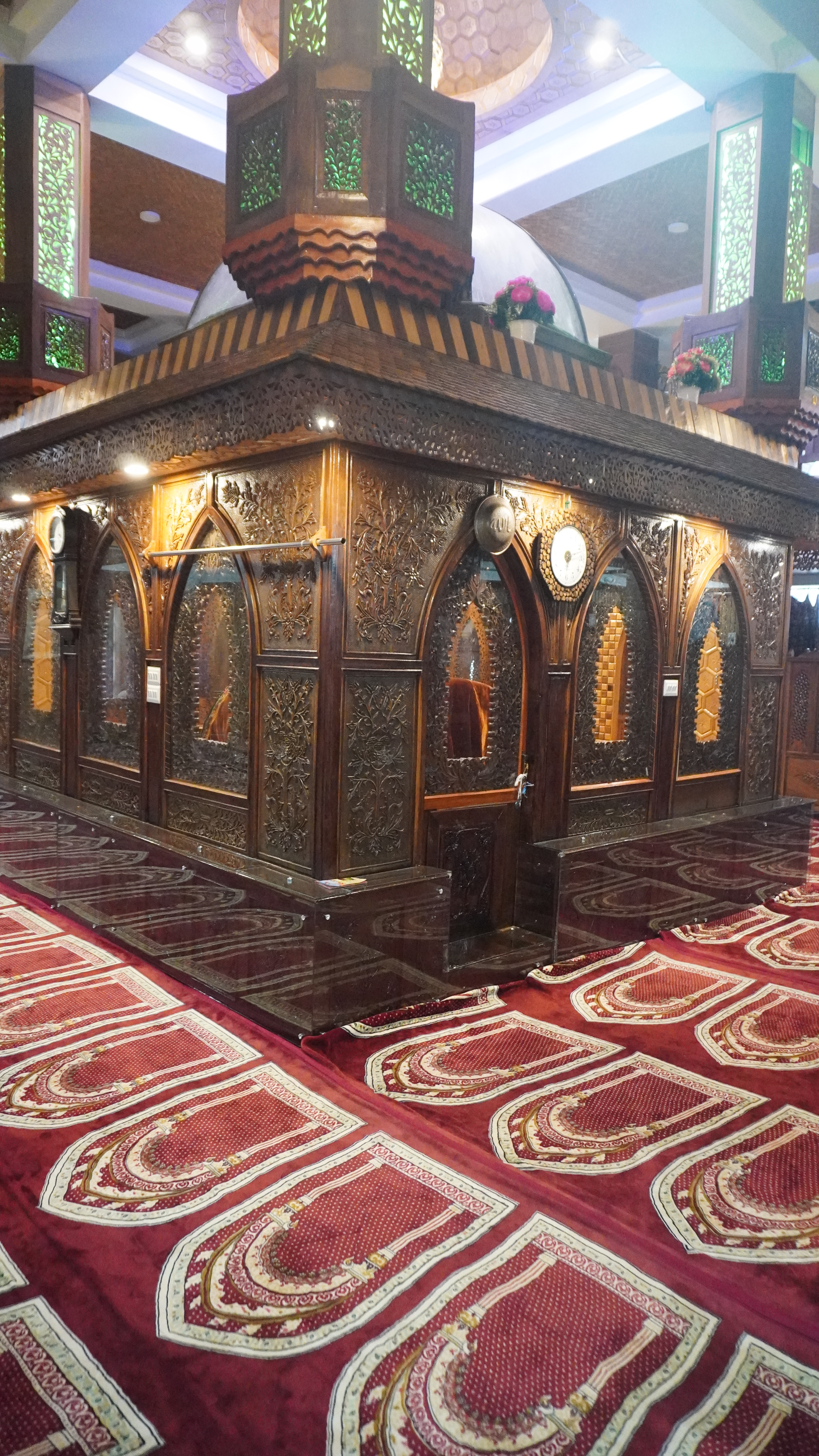
Inner view from corner

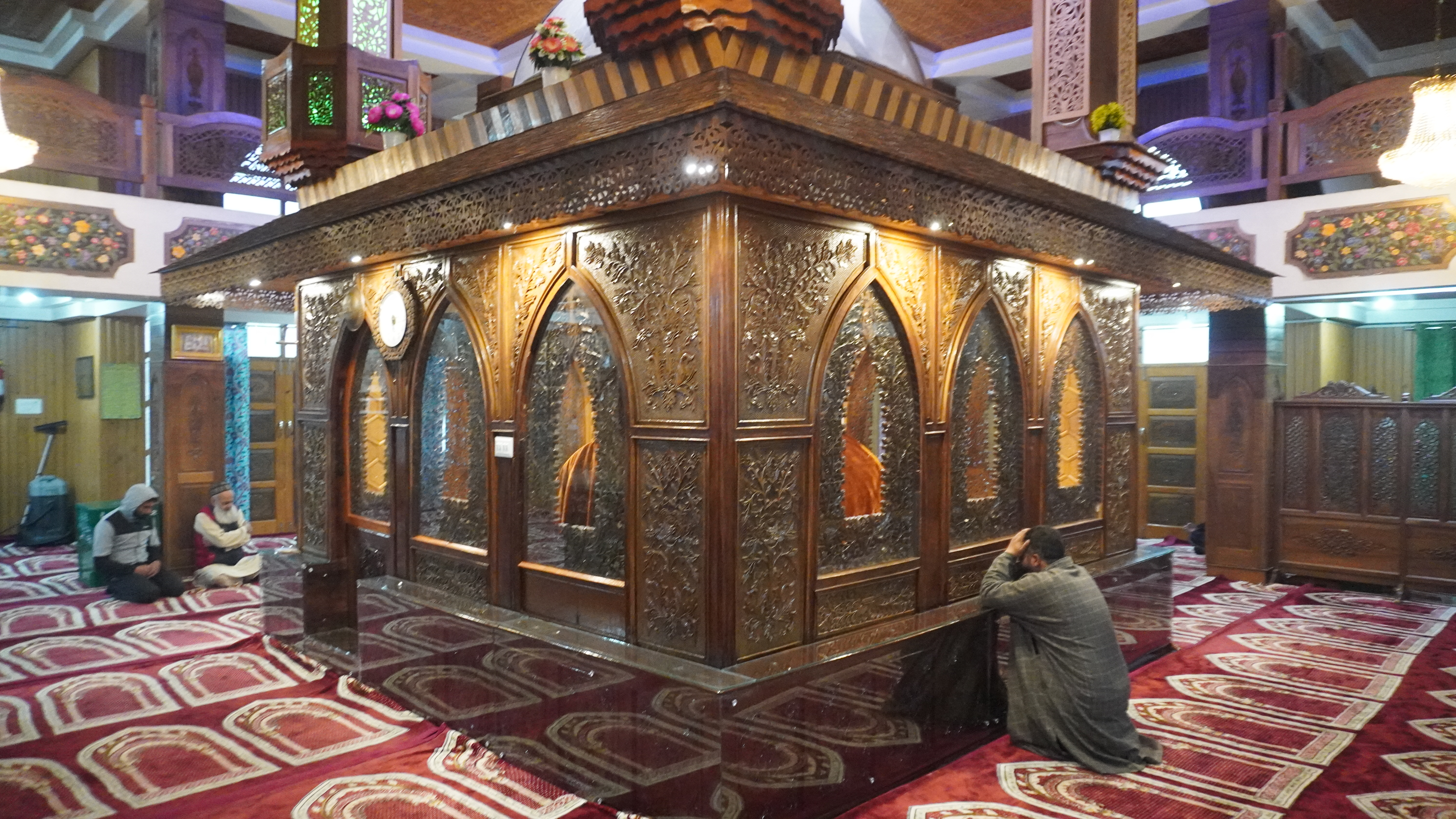
Inner view

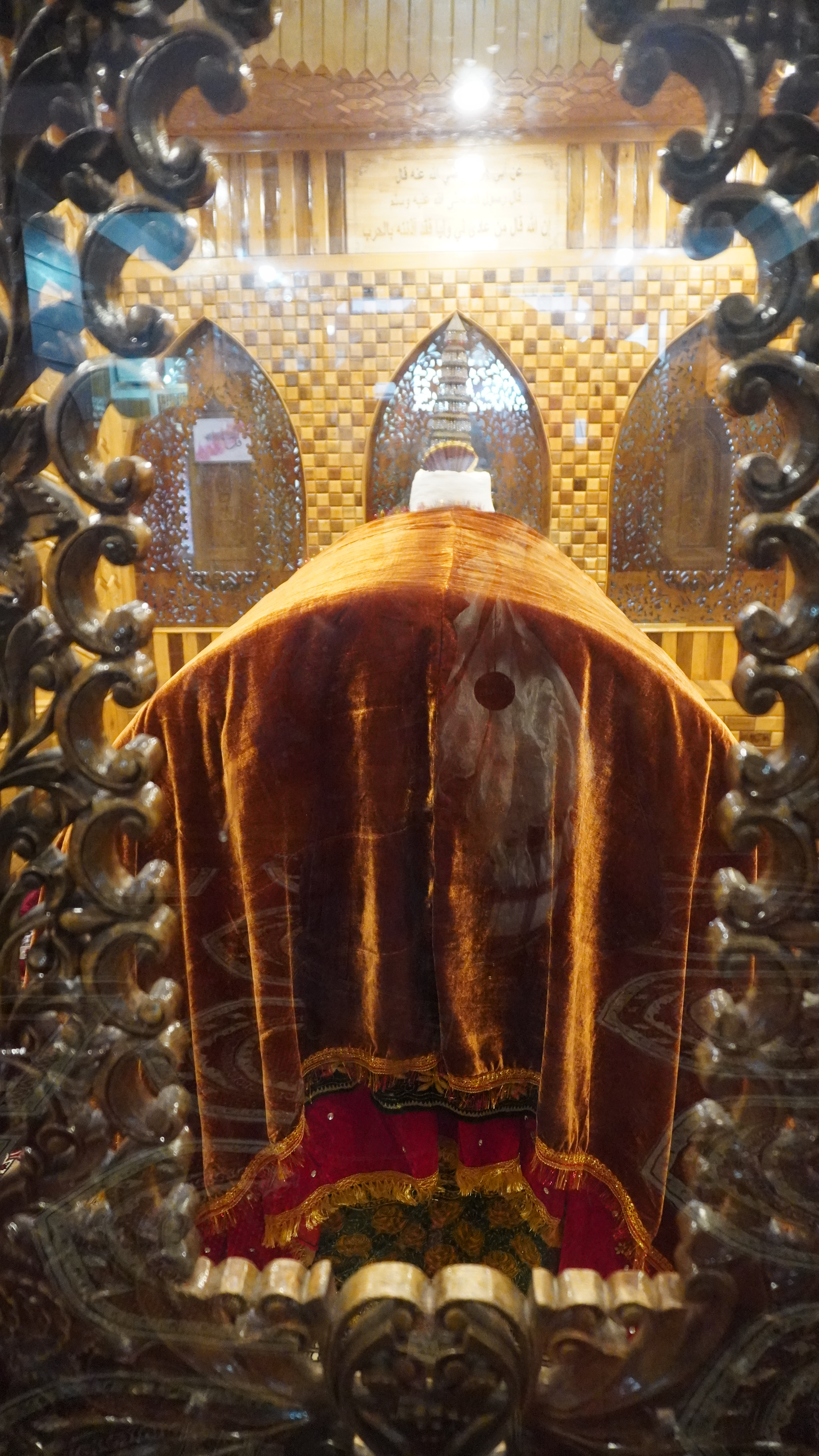
Tomb of Baba Reshi

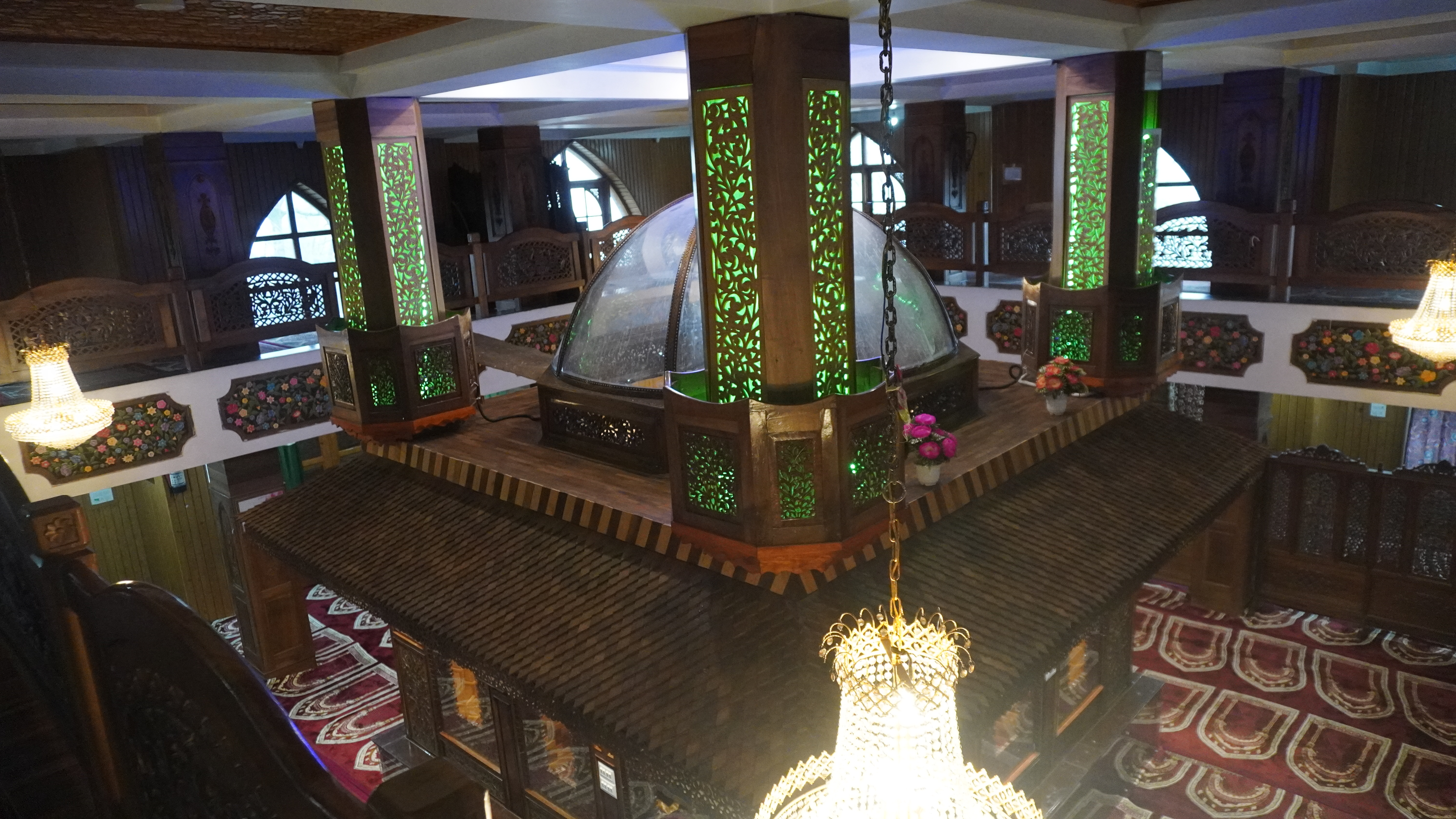
Ziyarat Baba Reshi shrine (view from first floor)

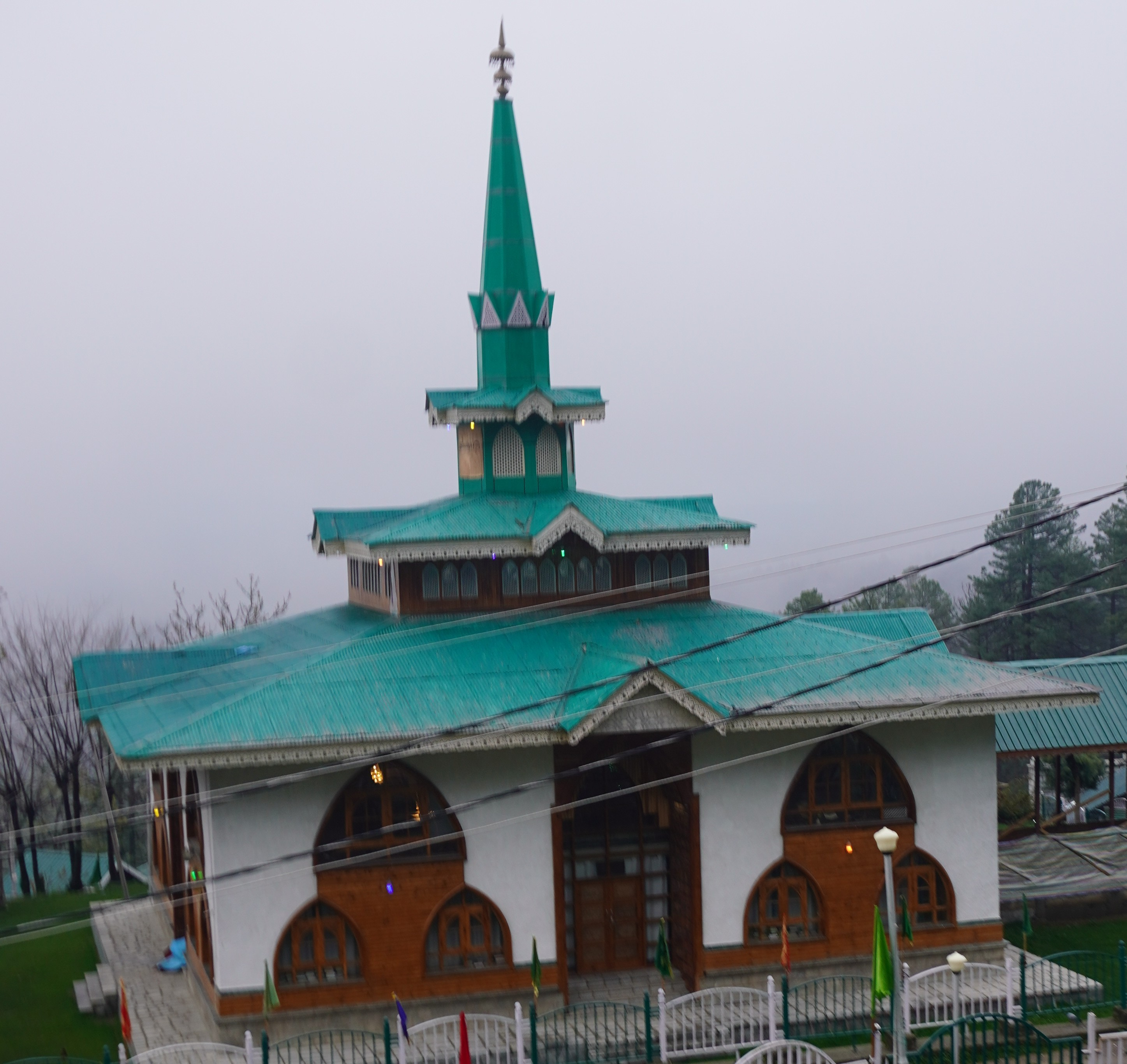
Ziyarat Baba Reshi shrine (Outer view)

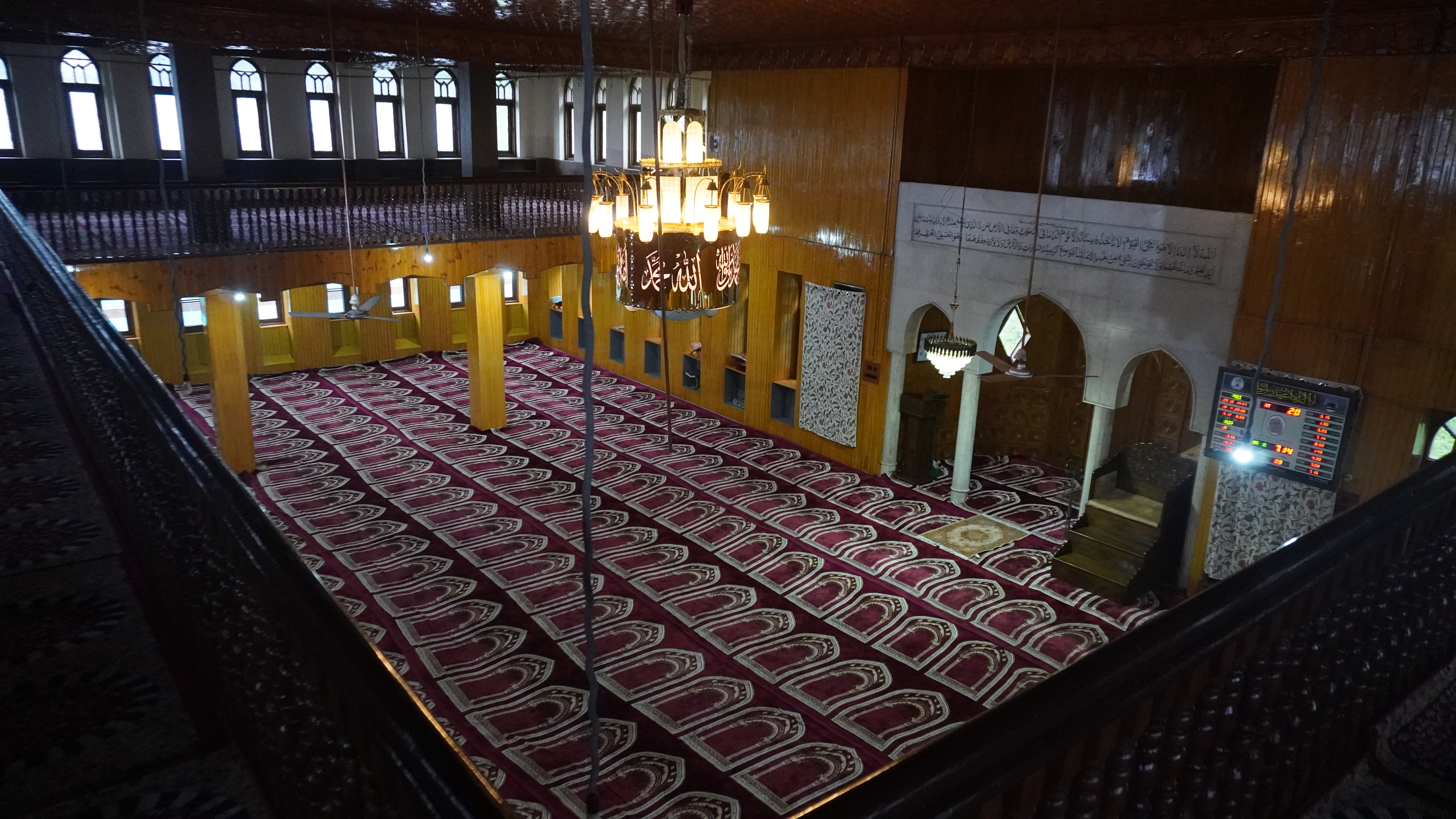
Mosque at the Ziyarat Baba Reshi shrine

== Transport ==
Baba Reshi is located near the Alpather Lake, about 13 km (8.1 mi) from Gulmarg on the highway connecting to Srinagar. The nearest airport is Srinagar International Airport and the nearest railway station is the Mazhom railway station.
