= Nund Rishi =

Kashmiri mystic (c. 1377 – c. 1438)

Shaykh; Alamdar-e-Kashmir; Sheikh ul-Alam; Nund Rishi
- نُنٛدٕ ریٛۆش
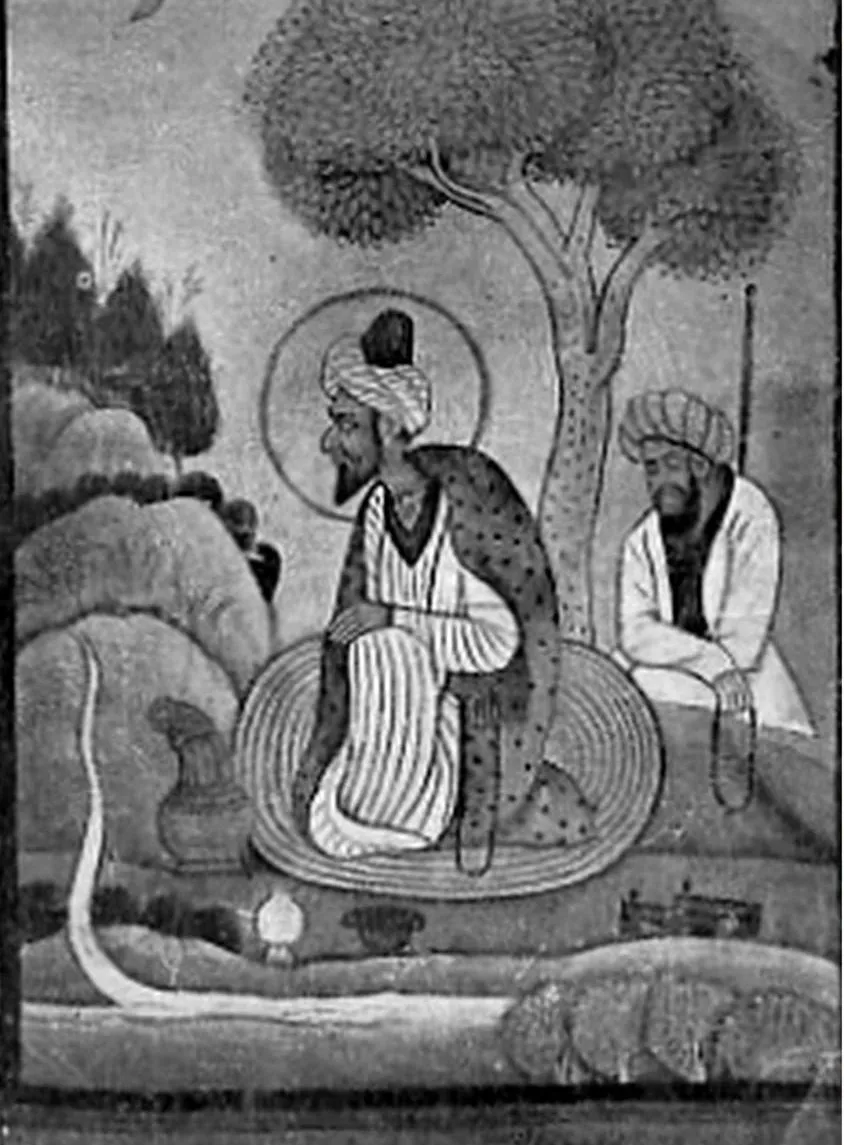
- Painting of Nund Rishi from a 17th-century manuscript known as Kashmiri Kalaam.
- Title: Sheikh ul-Alam (Spiritual Guide of The World) Alamdar-e-Kashmir (flag bearer of Kashmir) Sahajānanda (Innately Blissful One).

Personal life
- Born: Noor Ud-Din c. 1377 Khee Jogipora, Kashmir Sultanate (present-day Jammu and Kashmir)
- Died: c. 1438 Charari Sharief, Kashmir Sultanate
- Resting place: Charar-e-Sharief shrine 33°51′59″N 74°46′00″E
- Home town: Qaimoh, Kulgam

Religious life
- Religion: Islam
- Denomination: Sunni
- Tariqa: Rishi order

Muslim leader
- Influenced by: Lalleshwari, Mir Sayyid Ali Hamadani, Mir Sayyid Mohammed Hamadani
- Influenced: Shamas Faqir, Baba Reshi, Zayn al-Abidin the Great, Hamza Makhdoom, Baba Shukur ud-Din Wali, Baba Nasr ud-Din Rishi, Zain ud-Din Wali

Nund Rishi (Note: Kashmiri pronunciation: [nundɨ rʲoʃ], also spelled Nund Reshi) (c. 1377 or 1356 – c. 1438; born Noor-ud-Din (Note: The honorific of Sheikh is often added to his name, along with Wali or Noorani (lit. 'lustrous') added as suffix)) was a Kashmiri Sufi saint, mystic, poet and Islamic preacher. Nund Rishi is regarded among the founders of the Rishi order, an indigenous Sufi tradition that developed in Kashmir Valley during the fifteenth century. He is also known by the honorifics Sheikh al-Alam (lit. 'spiritual guide of the world') and Alamdar-e-Kashmir (lit. 'flag bearer of Kashmir') by Muslims, and Nund Lal and Sahajānanda (Innately Blissful One) by Hindus. His mystical poems, known as shruks, are among the important works of medieval Kashmiri literature.

He influenced many spiritual teachers and saints, including Hamza Makhdoom, Resh Mir Sàeb, and Shamas Faqir.

== Early life ==
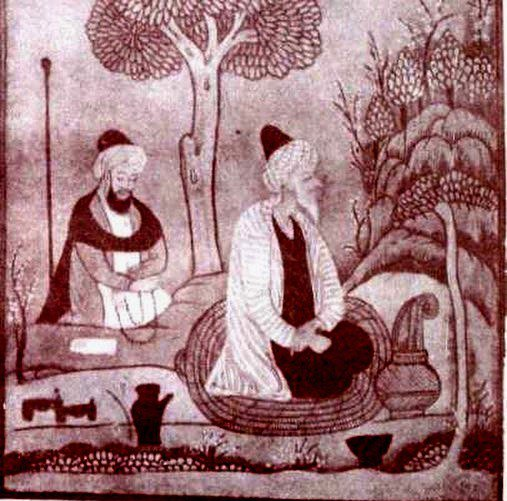
Painting of Sheikh Sheikh Noor-ud-Din Noorani, also known as Nund Rishi

Nund Rishi was born as Noor-ud-Din in the village of Khee Jogipora near Qaimoh, (Note: old name of Qaimoh was Katimusha) in present-day Kulgam district of Kashmir. Traditional biographical accounts give different dates for his birth, commonly placing it around 1377 CE. His parents are identified as Salar Sanz and Sadra, who is known in tradition as Sadra Moji or Sadra Deddi. (Note: In Kashmir, "Moji" refers to mother and "Deddi" denotes an elderly women, especially a paternal or maternal grandmother. It is widely used by the Kashmiri people to represent an elderly woman.)

Traditional accounts associate his family with the Kashmiri Muslim aristocracy and claim that his grandfather, Sheikh Salahuddin, came from a Rajput family of Kishtwar. One legend describes that the infant Noor-ud-Din initially refused to breastfeed by his mother and was nursed by the Kashmiri Hindu mystic Lalleshwari (Lal Ded).

As a young man, Noor-ud-Din is said to have worked as an apprenticed to traders. He later married to Zai Ded of Dadasara in Tral. The couple had three children, two sons and one daughter, all of whom died in infancy. Following their deaths, he increasingly withdrew from worldly life and adopted an ascetic way of life.

== Ascetism and spiritual development ==
By approximately the age of 30, traditional accounts describe Noor-ud-Din as increasingly detached. He began spending periods in solitude and meditation and adopted practices of ascetism and self-denial.

A cave or mound near Qaimoh known as Fikri Taing is traditionally associaed with his periods of retreat. later accounts also associate his spiritual development with under the influence of the Kubrawiya, particularly through the influence of the Persian saint Syed Hussain Simnani, who was active in kashmir.

Noor-ud-Din later began wandering through villages in the Kashmir Valley and preached to local communities. Unlike many learned religious figures of the period who wrote or preached primarily in Persian and Arabic, he used Kashmirivernacular as the principal language of his preaching and poetry. This helped established Kashmiri as a significant medium for mystical and religious expression.

== Teachings ==
Noor-ud-Din's teachings emphasized monotheism, ascetism, ethical conduct and universal brotherhood. His poetry addresses social divisions, including caste distinctions, ritualism and conflict between religious communities. As one contemporary scholar observes, he writes:

"We belong to the same parents, then why this difference? Let Hindus and Muslims worship God alone, we came to this world like partners.’”

He repeatedly urged tolerance and non-violence; he proclaimed:

“Here the good alone can claim noble descent; in the hereafter caste will be extinct”

Noor-ud-Din's message attracted people across faiths. Biographers note that many local Hindu ascetics (including sadhus, yogis and pandits) and Muslim missionaries gravitated to him. Abir Bazaz observes that during his lifetime notable figures such as Mir Mohammad Hamadani son of Mir Sayyid Ali Hamadani, and Syed Hussain Simnani “all developed contacts with him”.

Hindu monks and Kashmir Shaivites also became his followers. Under the sobriquet “Rishi”, a Sanskrit term for sage, Noor-ud-Din drew on both Islamic and Hindu mystical traditions.

With a message of tawhid (divine unity), Noor-ud-Din travelled the Kashmir Valley preaching peace. He established a network of followers, the nascent Rishi order, whose core values were simplicity, equality and non-violence. In his role as patron saint of the Valley, he is credited with making non-violence and religious harmony “the basic characteristics” of Kashmiri society. According to one study, “In Kashmiri poetry, he holds a very important position”, and he is remembered as a bridge between Kashmir's Shaiva and Sufi heritage. He outlived (by a few years) his fellow saint-poet Lal Ded or known as Lalleshwari, and tradition holds that her verses and example deeply influenced him. (The legend that Lalleshwari nursed him as an infant symbolizes their spiritual kinship).

== Hagiographical tradition ==
In his ascetic phase as a pir, he reportedly subsisted on a cup of milk a day and finally on water alone.

According to a dream seen by one of his foremost disciples Baba Nasr ud-Din, Noor ud-Din was one of the Abdal, in the work Kashmiri Sufism it is quoted:

On his sick-bed, he (Nasr ud-Din) dreamed that he saw a group of people and enquired who they all were, and who was sitting in their midst. They replied that they were the body of abdals and seated in the middle was the celebrated Shaykh Nuru'd-Din of Kaimuh. and they suggested that he visit him as soon as he could. if he wished to be cured of his disease.

Accounts report that Noor-ud-Din converted many people to Islam throughout his life. Some figures include the first spiritual successor to his Rishi order, Baba Bam ud-Din Rishi who converted after a long discussion on idol worship. After Baba Bam ud-Din Rishi's death, Rishi order was led by Zain ud-Din Wali of Aishmuquam as the second spiritual successor, it is said Noor ud-Din once got to know of Zain ud-Din's illness when he was not a Muslim, he then told his mother that he would make dua for them if they accepted Islam, hence it was Zia Singh (later Sakhi Zain ud-Din Wali) who became Muslim with his mother and accepted Islam, after the supplications done by Noor ud-Din, Zai Singh was cured. After the death of Sakhi Zain ud-Din Wali. Following them were Baba Latif ud-Din who desired the friendship of Noor ud-Din, who denied his offer of friendship until he didn't accept Islam, after yielding, Baba Latif ud-Din accepted Islam and became the Third Spiritual Successor to Sheikh Noor ud-Din Noorani, following them was Baba Nasr ud-Din as The Fourth Spiritual Successor.

== Philosophy ==
Noor-ud-Din was also a prolific mystical poet. His verses, called shruks are brief Kashmiri sayings (usually 4–6 lines) that capture existential and ethical themes. Bazaz and others emphasize that Rishi's poetry is steeped in negative theology: it speaks of God through negation, death, and the void. For example, he often reminds devotees of life's impermanence (“die before you die”) and praises the annihilation of the ego. At the same time, his shruks address social issues in plain language. As one scholar notes, Nund Rishi used Kashmiri “as the piercing mode of expressing [his] poetry” to reach the masses. The content of his poetry consistently stresses oneness and social justice. He explicitly denounces caste, hypocrisy and communalism, calling for equality before God. For instance, one translated verse declares:

“Here the good alone can claim noble descent; in the hereafter caste will be extinct.”

Another counsels religious harmony:

“We belong to the same parents, then why this difference? Let Hindus and Muslims worship God alone; we came to this world like partners.”

His environmental awareness is also remembered in lore (e.g., the famous “Ann Poshi” verse, “Food will thrive only as long as the woods survive”), reflecting respect for nature and rural life.

In sum, Noor-ud-Din's philosophy combined fervent monotheism with universal humanism. He rejected ritualism and violence, urging simple piety and compassion. He declared that all religions share one source, famously saying that Hindus and Muslims “came to this world like partners ". As one study concludes, “His thoughts have moulded the minds of [Kashmiris] for more than five centuries, establishing a culture of utmost religious tolerance with an abiding faith in the omnipresence of God.”. His poetry remains central to Kashmiri literature and spirituality; Kashmiri shruks (vernacular devotional poetry) owe much to Nund Rishi's example.

On another occasion, when invited to a feast, Noor-ud-Din went in ragged dress, earlier than the appointed time. The servants, not recognizing him, would not permit him to enter, and he had to go back to take his food at home. When all had sat for the sumptuous dinner, the Sheikh was specially sent for. He came, this time in a flowing chugha (cloak) and was given the seat of honour. But the Sheikh, instead of partaking of the food, stretched forth his sleeves and put them on the plates. The people were astonished at the sight and asked him the reason. He replied: "The feast was not really for Noor-ud-Din but for the long sleeves!"

== Role in Kashmiri History and Sufism ==
Noor-ud-Din is foundational to Kashmiri identity and Sufism. He is traditionally considered the founder of the local Rishi order (a syncretic Sufi tradition blending Islam with Kashmir's pre-Islamic mysticism). He and Lal Ded (Lalleshwari) are celebrated as Kashmir's two great saints, heralds of a vernacular, devotional culture. Bazaz notes that Kashmiris revere Nund Rishi as “Alamdār-i Kashmir” (“flag-bearer of Kashmir”) and “Shaikh al-‘Ālam” (“teacher of the world”). Indeed, tales of his life cross religious lines: even Hindus fondly call him Nund Lal and many Kashmiri Pandit families trace oral traditions to meetings with him.

Under Sultan Zayn al-Abidin the Great's tolerant rule, Nund Rishi's movement flourished. He is credited with safeguarding the Kashmiri language and culture at a time when Persian rule was ascendant. By preaching in Kashmiri rather than Arabic or Persian, he validated local folklore and speech. His emphasis on non-violence, vegetarianism, and egalitarian ethics also echoes Kashmir's indigenous values.

Even foreign rulers recognized his stature. In the 19th century, the Afghan governor Atta Muhammad Khan minted coins in Nund Rishi's name to legitimize his rule (Later, Sikh governor J. S. Ranbir Singh likewise patronized a coin issue honoring the saint.) Today, the Kashmiri government still awards the Sheikh-ul-Alam Award for contributions to cultural harmony, underscoring Nund Rishi's lasting symbolic role. As one scholar observes, “The centrality of Nund Rishi… to Kashmiri cultural memory has never been in question.”

== Literary works ==
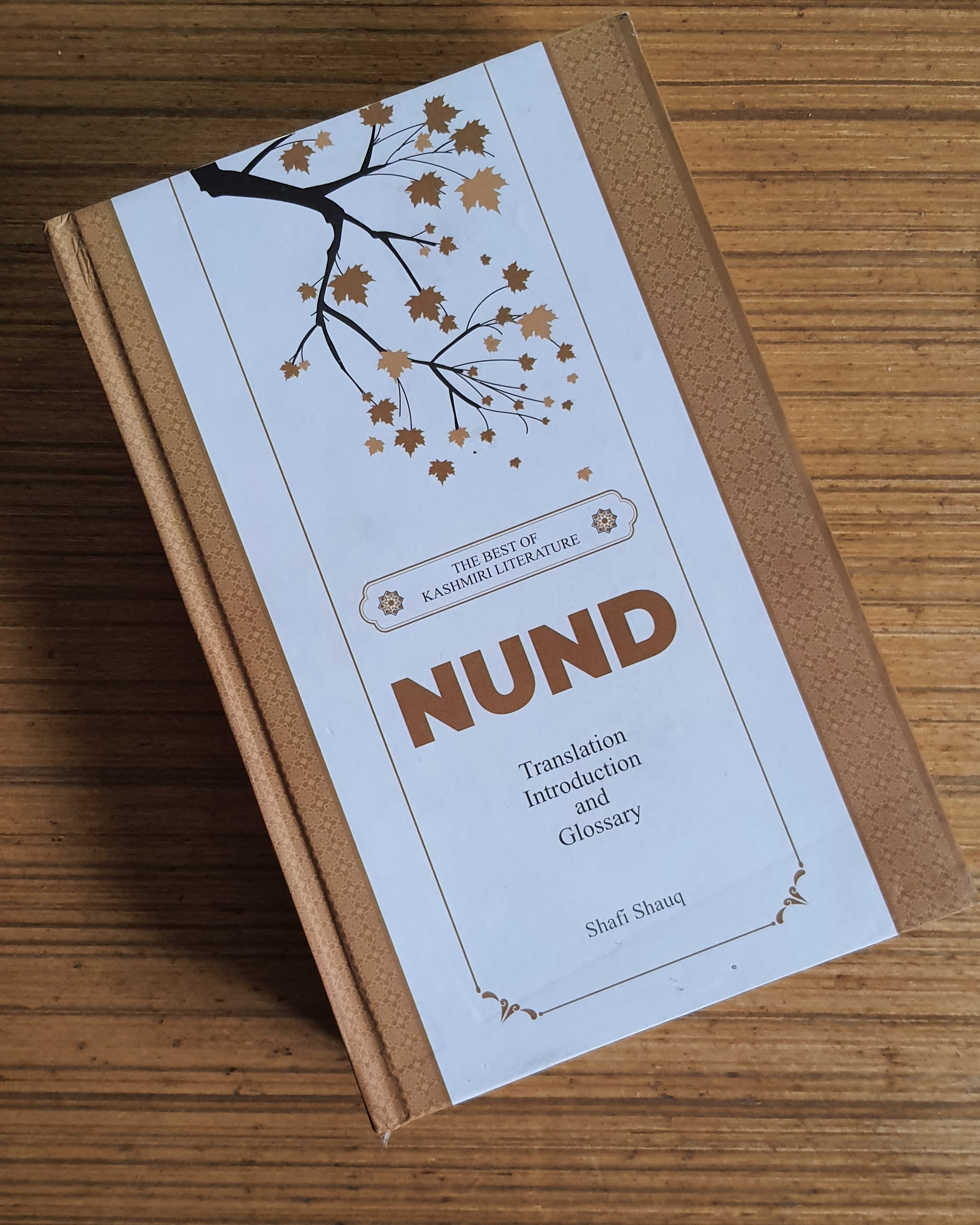
Nund Rishi's poetry by Shafi Shauq named "NUND"

Noor-ud-Din spread his teachings or message through poems, commonly known as shruks. (Note: Nund Rishi's poetry is known as "Shruks" or "Koshur Kuran". Koshur Kuran means a translated version of the original text of Qur'an.) His poems have four to six lines each and revolve around religious themes, highlight moral principles, and often call for peace. He strived for Hindu–Muslim unity. One of his prominent poems is Ann poshi teli yeli wan poshi, which translates as "Food will thrive only as long as the woods survive".

Kashmiri poet Lal Ded was Noor-ud-Din's contemporary and had a great impact on his spiritual growth. Some scholars argue that he was her disciple, and associate his poetry with the Bhakti movement, although others disagree.

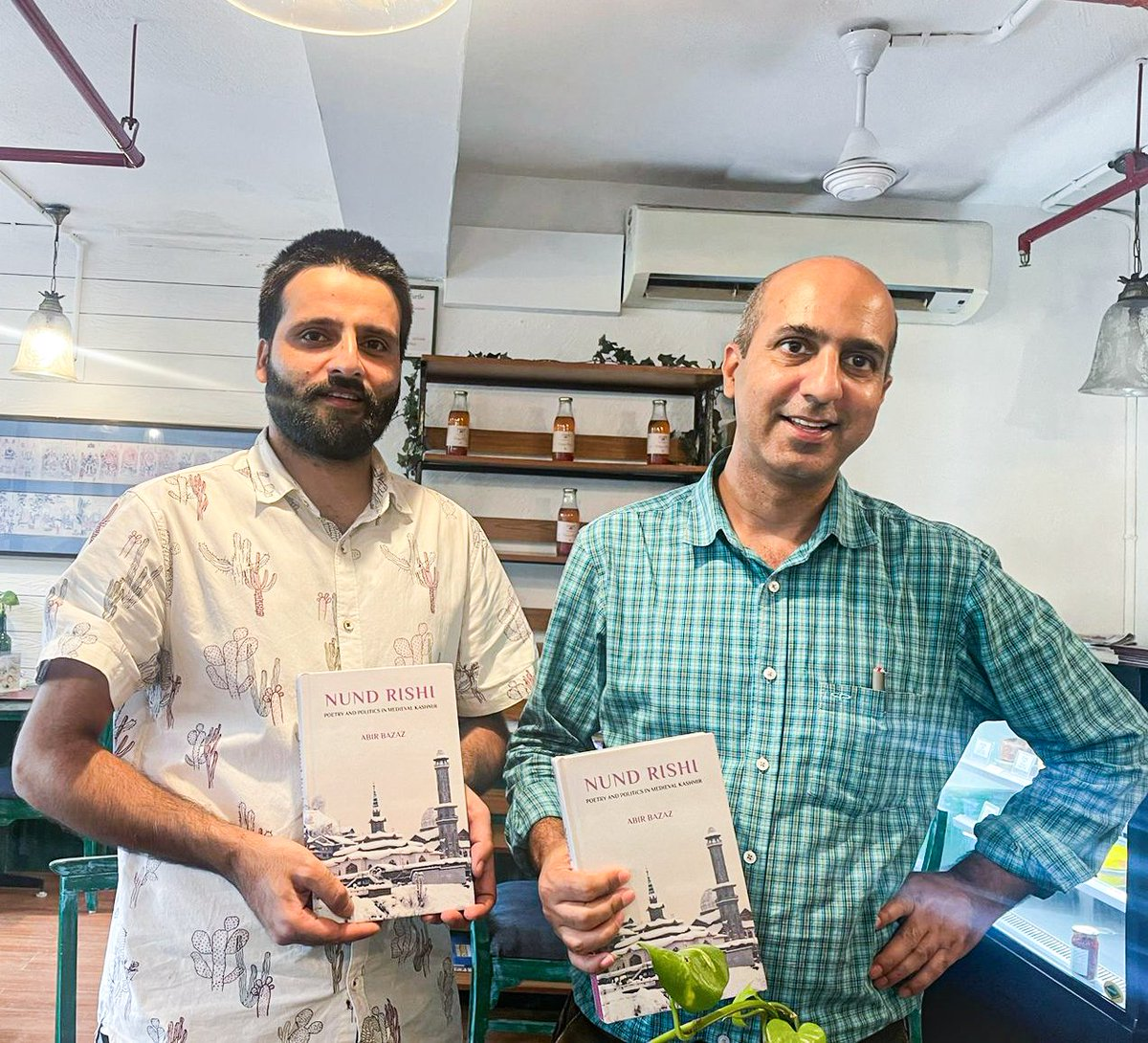
Abir Bazaz's book on Nund Rishi

Noor-ud-Din witnessed several transmissions of Hinduism and Islam in the valley throughout his life, although he was actively involved in philosophical work and in writing Kashmiri poems. In his verses, he recalled some events, including the arrival of Mir Sayyid Ali Hamadani to Kashmir.

There have been several books published on him, most notably Kalam-e-Sheikh ul-Alam. In 2023 academic Abir Bazaz wrote a book on Nund Rishi named Nund Rishi: Poetry and Politics in medieval Kashmir on the life and poetry of Nund Rishi. In 2024 Renowned poet and Professor Shafi Shauq released a book named Nund where he discussed the poetry of Nund Rishi with translations in English.

Noor-ud-Din is also credited with translating the Quran into Kashmiri language.

In 2015, the University of Kashmir published an Urdu book titled "Kalam-i-Sheikh-ul-Alam", comprising about 300 shruks of Nund Rishi translated into Urdu by Ghulam Muhammad Shad.

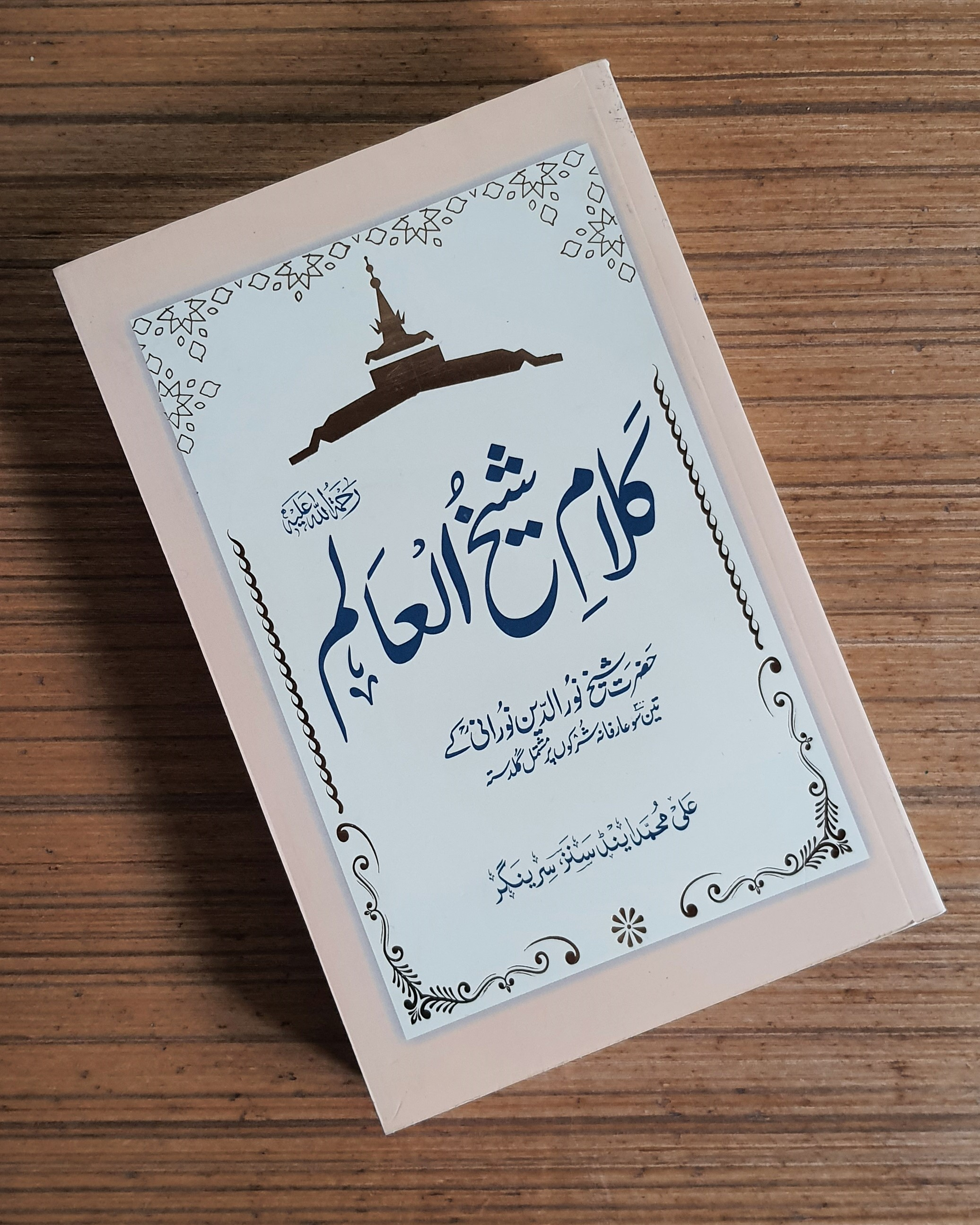
Kalam e Sheikh ul-Alam Prof Ghulam Mohammad Shad

== Death ==
Noor-ud-Din died in 1438 at the approximate age of 63. It is said in the local tradition that on the first two days of his death, over 900,000 people showed up to Charari Sharief for his funeral. Sultan Zain-ul-Abidin commissioned a tomb for his body at Charari Sharief. The Charar-e-Sharief shrine is visited by pilgrims to this day, especially on the eve of Noor-ud-Din's urs. His Urs was observed on 23 October 2022, this day has been declared a gazetted holiday by the government.

The Afghan governor, Atta Muhammad Khan, minted coins with Noor-ud-Din's name.

Noor-ud-Din's father, Sheikh Salar-Ud-Din, and two brothers, Kamal-Ud-Din and Jamal-Ud-Din, are buried near Dadasara while his wife is buried in Qaimoh.

== Disciples and Legacy ==
Noor-ud-Din's disciples were the early carriers of the Rishi movement. Many were drawn from the Hindu yogi and Pandit communities; indeed, Bazaz records that his key disciples – Baba Bam ud-Din, Baba Zain ud-Din, Baba Latif ud-Din and Baba Nasr ud-Din – were “recent converts to Islam,” who then helped spread the Rishi order. (Local tradition adds female disciples such as Behat Bibi, Dehat Bibi, Sham Dyeed and Shangu Bibi.) These followers propagated Noor-ud-Din's teachings in Kashmir's villages, blending Sanskritic and Islamic motifs in their own poetry and practices. In later centuries, the Rishi tradition inspired other saints: for example, the great 16th‑century Sufi Hamza Makhdoom is often said to have been spiritually influenced by Nund Rishi's legacy, even if he lived a generation later and was from the Suhrawardiyya Order. Similarly, the Reshi Mir Saeb of south Kashmir and the 19th‑century Shamas Faqir and Rahim Sopori belonged to the same syncretic tradition and honor Sheikh Noor-ud-Din's example.

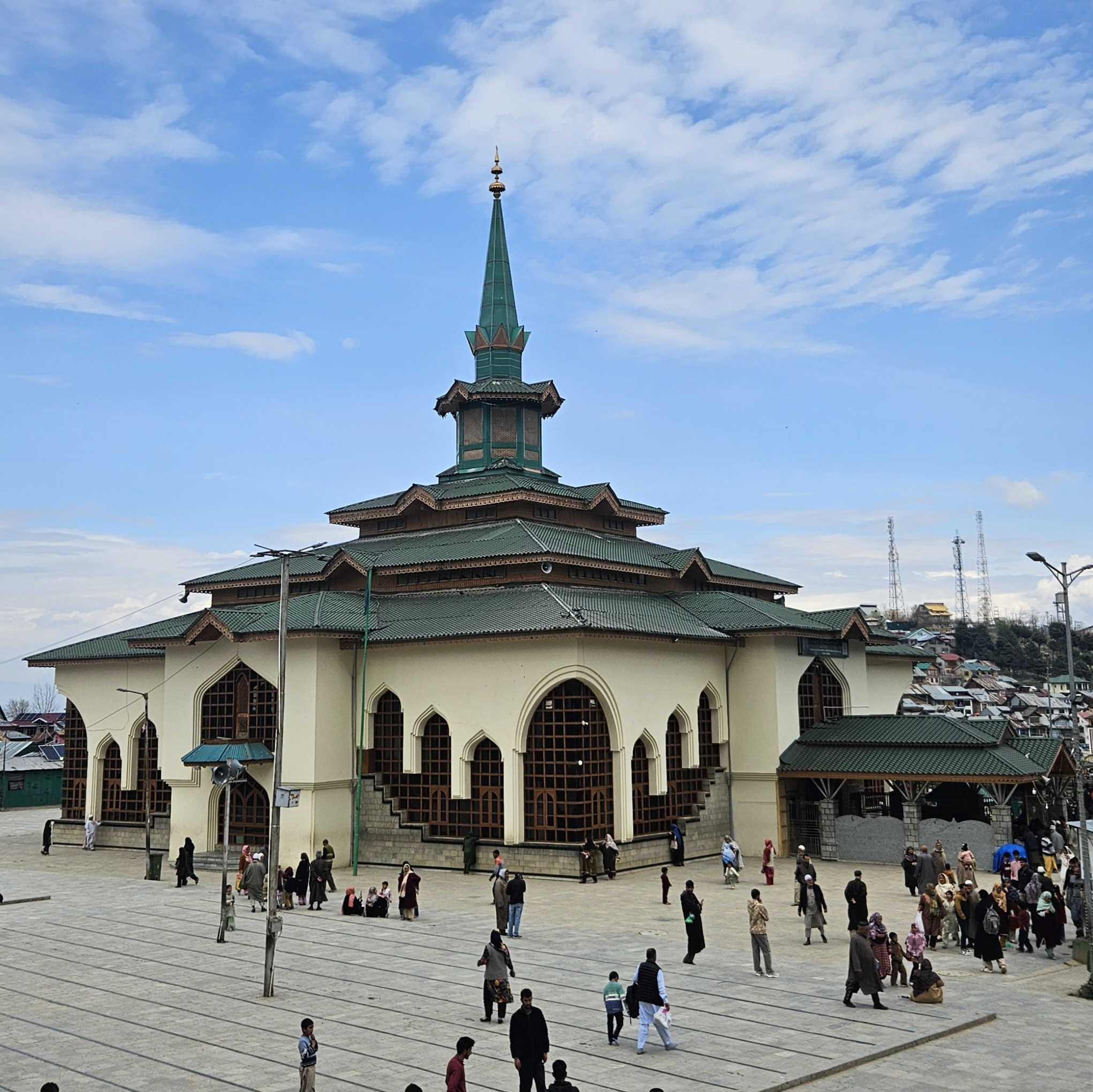
Charar e Sharif Shrine c.2026

Through his disciples and literary heirs (who wrote down the shruks centuries later), Noor-ud-Din's message endured. His kalam (sayings) were transcribed into Persian and Kashmiri texts, and are still recited in Kashmiri gatherings and Sufi circles. Culturally, he paved the way for Kashmir's composite heritage: his insistence on peace, unity, and devotion outside rigid dogma became a hallmark of Kashmiri Sufism (often called “Kashmiri Rishiism”). In sum, Sheikh Noor-ud-Din Noorani (Nund Rishi) remains a towering figure whose life and works shaped Kashmir's spiritual and cultural identity for over six centuries.

In 2005, the Government of India renamed the Srinagar airport to Sheikh ul-Alam International Airport and granted it international status.

== See also ==
- Abdul Qadir Gilani
- Mir Sayyid Ali Hamadani
- Baba Naseeb-ud-Din Ghazi
- Baba Haneef Ud Din Reshi
- Baba Nasr ud-Din Rishi
