= Aishmuquam =

Aishmuqam
- City
- Location in Jammu and Kashmir, India Aishmuqam (India)
- Coordinates: 33.86°N 75.27°E
- Country: India
- State: Jammu and Kashmir
- District: Anantnag
- Elevation: 1,900 m (6,200 ft)

Population (2011)
  - Total: 6,519

Languages
  - Official: Kashmiri, Urdu, Hindi, Dogri, English
- Time zone: UTC+5:30 (IST)

Aishmuqam is a municipal committee city in district of Anantnag, Jammu and Kashmir. It is one of the most prominent tourist spots in Anantnag and is located 15 kilometres (9.3 mi) from the town of Anantnag and 77 kilometres (48 mi) from Srinagar on the route to Pahalgam. The Aishmuqam shrine is located in Aishmuqam.

== Geography ==
The town is located on both sides of the Shah Kul The Canal which was constructed by Zain ul Abidin one of the better rulers of Kashmir Aishmuqam is located at 33.86°N 75.27°E. It has an average elevation of 1,900 m (6,200 ft).

== Religion ==
=== Karkoot Nag Hindu site ===
Karkota dynasty (c. 625 − 855 CE) era idols of Hindu deities and Shiva Lingam were found at Karkoot Nag spring in Salia area of Aishmuqam during renovation, which will be sent to SPS Museum in Srinagar. Since this spring and pound site is sacred to the Kashmiri Pandits, they have demanded the construction of new temple at the site to house idols and sculptures.

=== Aishmuqam Shrine ===
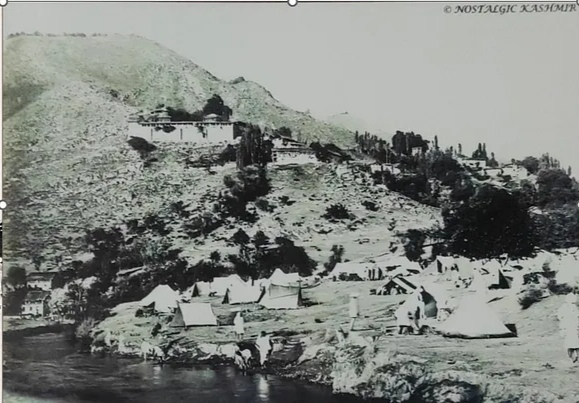
Shrine of Hadrat Zainuddin Wali, Aishmuqam, 1898.

The shrine is considered as one of the most visited and prominent shrines in Kashmir. It was constructed in the honour of Sakhi Zain ud-Din Wali, who was one among the chief disciples of Nund Rishi and is the 2nd spiritual seccessor of The Rishi order. It is considered sacred by many people from different religions. Zain ud-Din Wali spent most of his time preaching about Allah. For this purpose he decided to always restrict himself to this cave. The shrine is thronged by thousands of devotees during the annual Urs and Zool festival.

== Transport ==
=== Road ===
Aishmuquam is 22 km from Anantnag on The NH 501 The distances of some other towns from Anantnag are: Achabal 28 km, Kokarnag 45 km, Martand 19 km and Pahalgam 20 km.

== Demographics ==
As of 2011 India census, Aishmuqam had a population of 6,519.

Religion in Aishmuqam
Religion	Percent
Islam	100%
Christianity	0.00%
