= Aga Syed Mustafa Moosavi =

Scholar

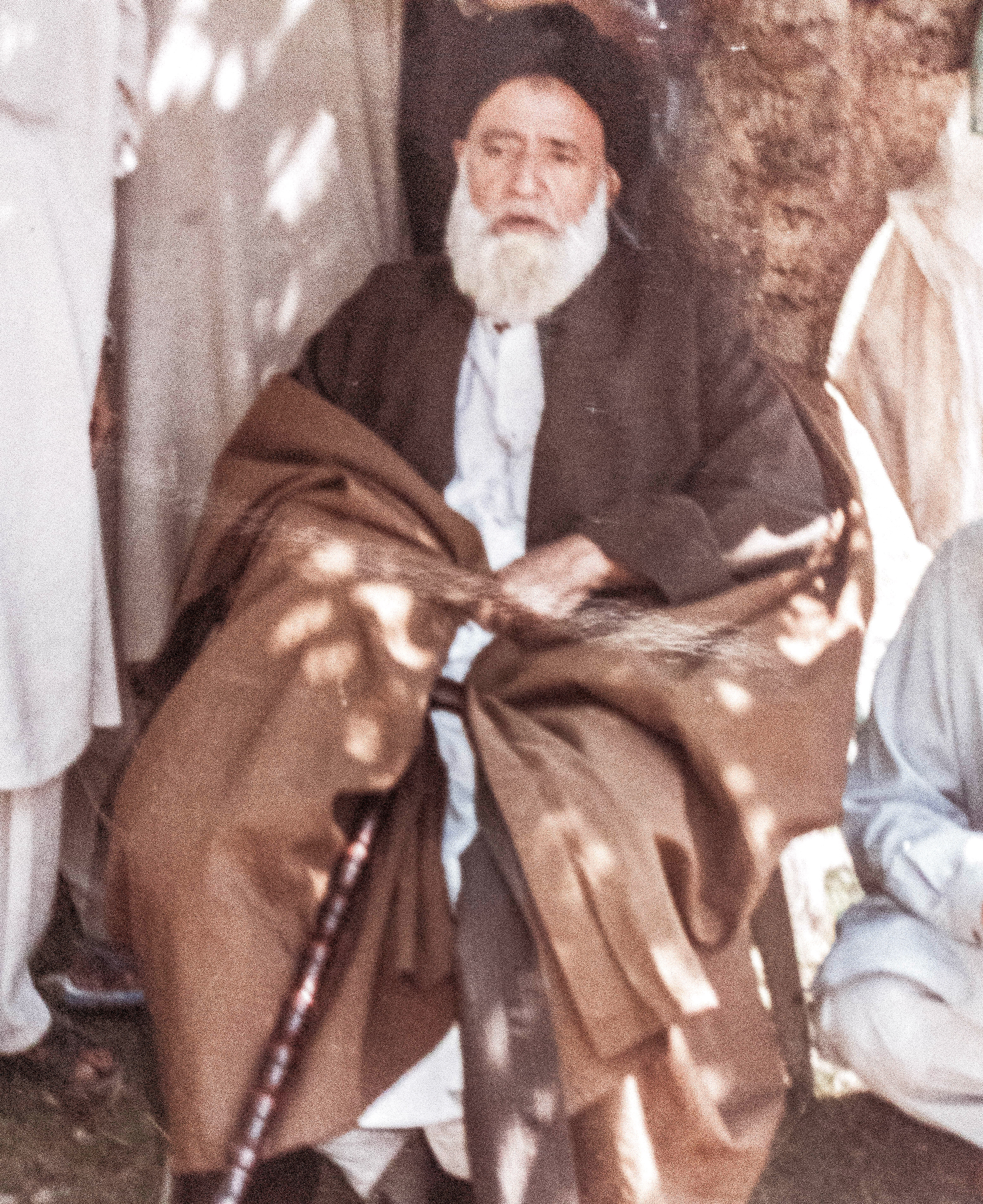
- Title: Aga Sahab (آغا صاحب); Abu Shaheedain

Personal life
- Born: 2 February 1918 Budgam
- Died: 21 August 2002 (aged 84) Budgam
- Resting place: Ziyarat E Sarkaar, Budgam
- Education: Hawza 'Ilmiyya Najaf, Iraq

Religious life
- Religion: Islam
- Order: Shia Islam (Usuli Twelver)

Muslim leader
- Post: Cleric; Jurist; President and Patron of Anjuman-e-Sharie Shiyan; Representative of Imam Khomeini for Kashmir; Representative of Imam Khamenei for Kashmir; Chairman Madras E Baab-Ul-Ilm
- Period in office: 1982-2002
- Predecessor: Aga Syed Yousuf Al-Moosavi
- Successor: Aga Syed Hassan Al-Moosavi

Mustafa Al-Moosavi Al-Safvi (2 February 1918 – 21 August 2002) widely known as Aga Sahab (Urdu: آغا صاحب) was a Kashmiri Shia Muslim cleric, Islamic Jurist, Islamic scholar, philanthropist and former President of Anjuman-e-Sharie Shiyaan Jammu and Kashmir. Protagonist of Wilayat-e Faqih in Jammu & Kashmir. Former chairman of Madras E Babul Ilm.

== Early life and education ==
Aga Syed Mustafa Al-Moosavi Al-Safvi was born on 2 February 1918 to Ayatullah Aga Syed Ahmad. He is a descendant of Mir Shams-ud-din Muhammad Iraqi, who came to Kashmir in the 15th century as a political envoy. Aga Syed Mustafa began studying the Quran and theology from a young age and was assisted in his religious studies by his grandfather Aga Syed Muhammad, his father Ayatullah Aga Syed Ahmad, his uncle Aga Syed Yousuf, and Haji Amin Sahab. At the age of 22 years he lost his father Aga Syed Ahmed Al-Moosavi, people chose Aga Syed Mustafa as Aga Syed Ahmad's successor but Mustafa refused to accept the role, wanting his uncle Aga Syed Yousuf as the successor of his father. He entrusted the family affairs to his uncle who took over the traditional responsibilities performed by the Aga family. Aga Syed Mustafa went to Hawza 'Ilmiyah Najaf, Iraq for higher studies to fulfill his late father's wish. He was edified by Al-Haaj Aga Syed Abul Hassan Mashadi, Al-Uzma Al-Haaj Hazrat Aga Syed Mohsin Al-Hakeem Tabatabie, Aga Buzurg Tehrani, Mohammad Fazel Lankarani, Abdullah Sharudi, Mohammad Hadi Milani. He was very close to Ayatullah Al-Uzma Al-Haaj Hazrat Aga Syed Mohsin Al-Hakeem Tabatabaei and learnt from marja's like Al-Azm Mohsin Al-Hakeem, Ayatullah Syed Borjadi, Ayatullah Mar'ashi Najafi, Ayatullah Hadi Milani, Ayatullah Agha Bozorg Tehrani, Ayatullah Abdullah Shirazi, and Ayatollah Ruhollah Khomeini.

== Clerical career ==
After returning to Kashmir Aga Syed Mustafa worked as the deputy of his uncle and helped him in the religious affairs. In Kashmir he headed the Sharia Court founded by Ayatullah Aga Syed Mehdi Sarkaar over 100 years previously. Aga Syed Yousuf and Aga Syed Mustafa introduced and promoted the concept of Wilayat Al-Faqih in Kashmir. In 1980 Ayatullah Khamenei was invited to Kashmir by Aga Syed Yousuf, Ayatullah Khamenei addressed the people of Kashmir from the pulpit of historic Jamia Masjid Srinagar and his speech was translated by Shaheed Aga Syed Muhammad Hussain. After the death of Aga Syed Yousuf in August 1982, a division took place regarding the matter of succession. The Iranian Ayatullah Ruhollah Khomeini, Grand Ayatollah Nasir Makarem Sherazi, and several other religious leaders declared Ayatullah Aga Syed Mustafa to be the rightful successor. Aga Syed Mustafa took an initiative to abolish sectarianism which are known as Firqa Qadeem and Firqa Jadeed, this discord among the Muslims was installed by the Governments and anti Islamic elements. Molvi Iftikhar Hussain Ansari and Shaheed Aga Syed Muhammad Hussain were the patrons of this movement. In February 1984, the eldest son of Ayatullah Aga Syed Mustafa, Hujjat-ul-Islam Aga Syed Muhammad Hussain was poisoned by the enemies of Islam. Aga Syed Mohammad Hussain was the patron of unity among Muslims as well as non-Muslims in Kashmir.

After the death of Imam Khomeini in 1989, Aga Syed Mustafa introduced Ayatullah Ali Khamenei to the people of Kashmir as Wali-Amr-al-Muslimin. He said: " I recognize both Imam Khomeini and Imam Khamenei as one." He bestowed Ayatullah Uzma Sayyid Ali Khamenei with the title of "Rahbar E Kabeer Saani"^{(}. In November 2000, another son of Ayatullah Aga Syed Mustafa, Shaheed Aga Syed Mehdi was assassinated by an improvised explosive device on his way to attend a Majlis e Hussaini at Magam. After this incident, Ali Khamenei invited Aga Sahab to the Islamic Republic of Iran to show empathy and offer condolences. Following martydom of two of his sons, Aga Sahab became popularly known as "Abu Shaheedain" (Father of Martyrs), among the people. "Oh Muslims! Unity Unity" were the lines Aga Syed Mustafa frequently used to quote.

== Death ==
Abu Shaheedain Aga Syed Mustafa died on 21 August 2002 due to prolonged illness, according to official reports hundreds of thousands of people attended the funeral prayer at Budgam. Late Aga Syed Mustafa is buried at ancestral Shrine in Budgam Kashmir or Aga Sahib Shrine.

== See also ==
- Aga Syed Mohammad hadi
- Destruction of Kashmiri Shias
