= Aga Syed Yusuf Al-Moosavi Al-Safavi =

Founder of Anjuman Sharie Shian

- Title: Aga Sahib

Personal life
- Born: 1904 Budgam, Kashmir, India
- Died: 29 August 1982 (aged 77–78) Budgam, Kashmir, India
- Other name: بوڈ آغا صوب

Religious life
- Religion: Islam, Shia

Senior posting
- Based in: Budgam
- Post: Cleric; Founder and Patron of Anjuman-e-Sharie Shiyan; Representative of Imam Rahil for Kashmir
- Period in office: 1946-1982
- Predecessor: Aga Syed Ahmad Al-Moosavi Al-Safavi
- Successor: Disputed Succession of Aga Family; Aga Syed Mustafa Moosavi; Aga Syed Mohammad Fazlullah Moosavi; Aga Syed Mohammad Baqir Al-Moosavi Al-Najfi

Syed Yousuf Al-Moosavi Al-Safavi (1904 – 29 August 1982) (Urdu: آغا سید یوسف الموسوی الصفوی) was a Kashmiri religious scholar and leader of Shia Muslims. He founded the Anjuman-e-Sharie organization. (Note: Agha sahib, a term meaning "lord" or "commander", was used in reference to Kashmiri.))

== Early life ==
Yousuf was born in Budgam in 1322 Hijri. He completed his education in Islamic law from Najaf in Iraq. He is a descendant of Mir Shamsuddin Araki, who came to Kashmir in the 13th century from the town of Arak in Markazi Province, Iran. After the death of his elder brother Aga Syed Ahmed Almosavi, he took over the responsibilities of the Aga family. He established an educational institution for Islamic learning called Madras-e Babul Ilem ("gateway of knowledge") in Budgam. Madars-e Babul Ilem is the Alma mater of many in the Kashmir literary field.

It is the practice among Shias of Kashmir to go to their religious head (Maulvi (Ansari's) or Agas) for legal disputes instead of to government courts. Such Sharie Adalats ("religious courts") determine justice according to Islamic doctrine. During the period of Aga Yousef, Sharie Adalats became very popular. On a number of occasions the district court sent cases to Yousef's court.

== Career ==
=== Anjumane Sharie Shian ===
Aga Syed Yousef established Anjumane Sharie Shian in Jammu and Kashmir with both religious and political goals. Just as the government receives taxes from the general public, Anjuman Sharie Shian collects khums and fitr as alms from the Shia population to spend on social, educational and economic improvement for the poorer segment of the community. When Sheikh Abdullah's government passed the Land Reform Act, Aga Syed Yousef said the bill was against the doctrine of Shi'ism, which resulted in the government exempting Shias from the bill.

=== Other accomplishments ===
Yousuf undertook the construction of Imambara Budgam. He widened the Imambara Hassanabad, a smaller replica of the one in Budgam. Yousef also introduced the Shia nisab ("syllabus") at the University of Kashmir. He was the representative of Imam Khomeini.

== Personal life ==
Yousuf died on 29 August 1982. After his death, the district hospital of Budgam was named after him. Yousuf was buried in Budgam at the Aga Mehdi shrine. The shrine was constructed by Yousuf himself during his lifetime to honor Sarkar Aga Syed Mehdi, who was also Yousuf's grandfather. His son was Aga Syed Mohammad Fazlullah who died on 29 January 2018 in Budgam.

== Succession ==
Aga Syed Yousuf died on 29 August 1982. He was the only patron and president of Anjumane Sharie Shian. Three renowned scholars of "Aga Family" claimed as his successor. Aga Syed Mustafa Moosavi, Aga Syed Mohammad Fazlullah Moosavi are considered three successors of Aga Syed Yousuf. Followers of Aga Syed Yousuf were divided into two factions: "Mustafai" followers of Aga Syed Mustafa Moosavi, "Muhammadi" followers of Aga Syed Mohammad Fazlullah Moosavi. After the deaths of Aga Syed Mustafa Moosavi and Aga Syed Mohammad Fazlullah Moosavi their factions are led by Aga Syed Hassan Budgami and Aga Syed Mohammad Hadi Moosavi respectively.

== See also ==
- Syed Mustafa Moosavi
- Syed Mohammad Fazlullah
- Shaheed Aga Syed Mehdi
- Mohammad Abbas Ansari
- Masroor Abbas Ansari
- Ghulam Rasool Noori
- Aga Syed Ruhullah Mehdi
- Succession of Aga Family
- Aga Syed Mohammad Hadi
- Tafazzul Husain Kashmiri
- Destruction of Kashmiri Shias
