= Ichgam =

Town in Jammu and Kashmir, India

Ichgam Aliabad Ichgam
- Town
- Ichgam
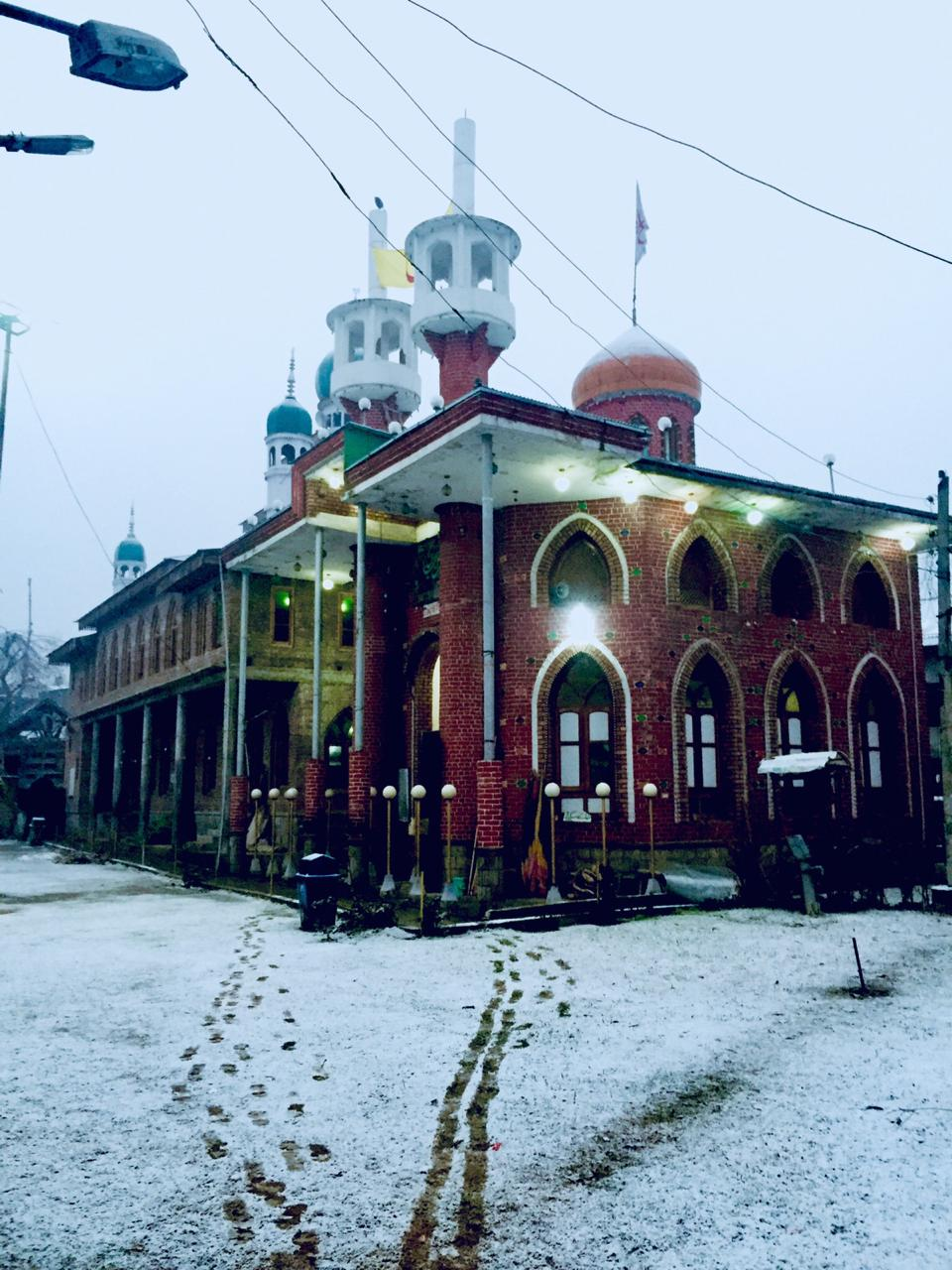
- The shrine of Hazrat Abbas in Ichigam.
- Nickname: Aliabad Ichgam
- Location in Jammu and Kashmir, India Ichgam (India)
- Coordinates: 33°59′09″N 74°45′10″E
- Country: India
- Union Territory: Jammu and Kashmir
- District: Budgam

Area
  - Total: 4.64 km^{2} (1.79 sq mi)
- Elevation: 1,622 m (5,322 ft)

Population (2011)
  - Total: 7,461
  - Density: 1,610/km^{2} (4,160/sq mi)

Languages
  - Official: Kashmiri, Urdu, Hindi, Dogri, English
- Time zone: UTC+5:30 (IST)
- PIN: 191111
- Literary rate: 91.5%
- Sex Ratio: 953 ♀/ 1000 ♂
- Website: budgam.nic.in

Ichgam, also known as Ichigam, is a census town located in the Indian administered union territory of Jammu and Kashmir's Budgam district. It falls under the administrative division of tehsil Budgam, one of the nine tehsils of district Budgam. It is one of the most populated area of Budgam district. It is roughly 5 km (3.1 mi) away from district Budgam and nearly 19 km (12 mi) away from Srinagar, the summer capital of union territory of Jammu and Kashmir. Ichgam village consists of four blocks — Ichgam-A, Ichgam-B, Ichgam-C and Ichgam-D. The village consists of both major sects of Islam, Shias (70%) and Sunnis(30%). There is also a Hindu minority.

== Demographics ==
As of 2011, the population of Ichgam is 7,461 of which 3,820 are males while the remaining 3,641 are females as per the report released by Census of India. Population of children with age of 0-6 is 15.64% that's 1,167 of the total population of Ichgam. In Ichgam, the female sex ratio is of 953 against the erstwhile state average of 889. The child sex ratio in Ichgam village is around 1,065 compared to a previous state average of 862. Literacy rate of the Ichgam is 91.5% higher than the former state average of 67.16%. In Ichgam, male literacy is around 93% while female literacy rate is 90%. (Note: This information about Ichgam is as per the reports released by the Government of Jammu and Kashmir in 2011 in accordance with the census of India.)

== Geography ==
The total area of Ichgam is 4.64 km^{2} (1.79 sq mi). It is located at 33.9859°N 74.7527°E, at an elevation of 1,622 m (5,322 ft) above the sea level. Its distance from the summer capital of Jammu and Kashmir, Srinagar, is 19 km (12 mi). The Srinagar International Airport is located near to the village Ichgam.

== Education ==
=== Schools in Ichgam ===
==== Government Boys Higher Secondary School Ichgam ====
Government Boys Higher Secondary School Ichgam is located at the main bus stand of Ichgam, behind the newly built complex. Managed by the Department of Education, the school was established in the year 1930. The medium of instructions in this school is English. Government Boys Higher Secondary School is housed in the two government owned buildings. The UDISE code of the school is 01040900603. The school is co-educational and consists of the classes from nine (9th) to twelve (12th).

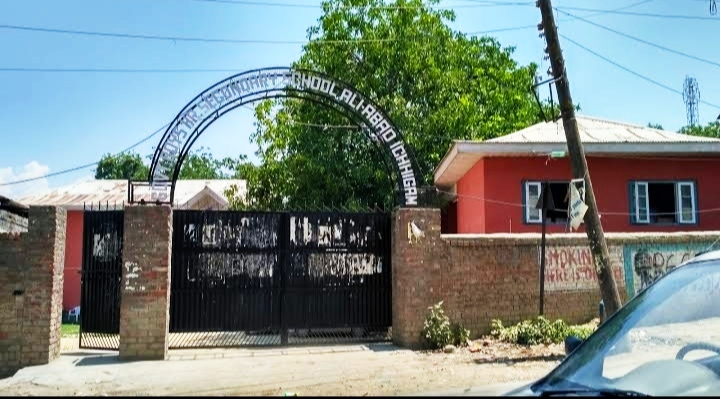
Image of the gate of Government Boys Higher Secondary School Ichgam

==== Imamia Public School Ichgam ====
Imamia Public School (IPS) Ichgam is managed and run by Educational Trust Kashmir (ETK), the organization that runs many schools in the Kashmir Valley named, Imamia Public Schools. The school was established in 1989 and is located at the Kalbal, the Northwestern part of the town; behind the Primary Health Center Ichgam. Its UDISE code is 01040900606. At present, nearly 400 above students are studying in this school. Imamia Public School is housed in the Educational Trust Kashmir owned, big three floor building.

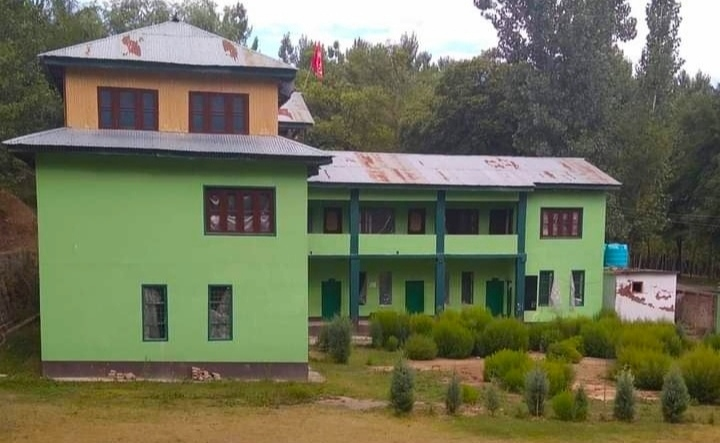
Imamia Public School Ichgam

==== Others ====
- Government Girls High School Ichgam
- Government Middle School Ichgam
- Government School Wolina, Ichgam
- Government School Baghat Mohalla, Ichgam
- Government School Naru, Ichgam
- IEI Ichgam
- Hasnain Educational Institute, Ichgam

== Healthcare System ==
As of December 2020, there are numerous Medical shops and stores present in the village of Ichgam. The Primary Health Centre Ichgam is located at Kalbal, the north-western part of Ichgam.

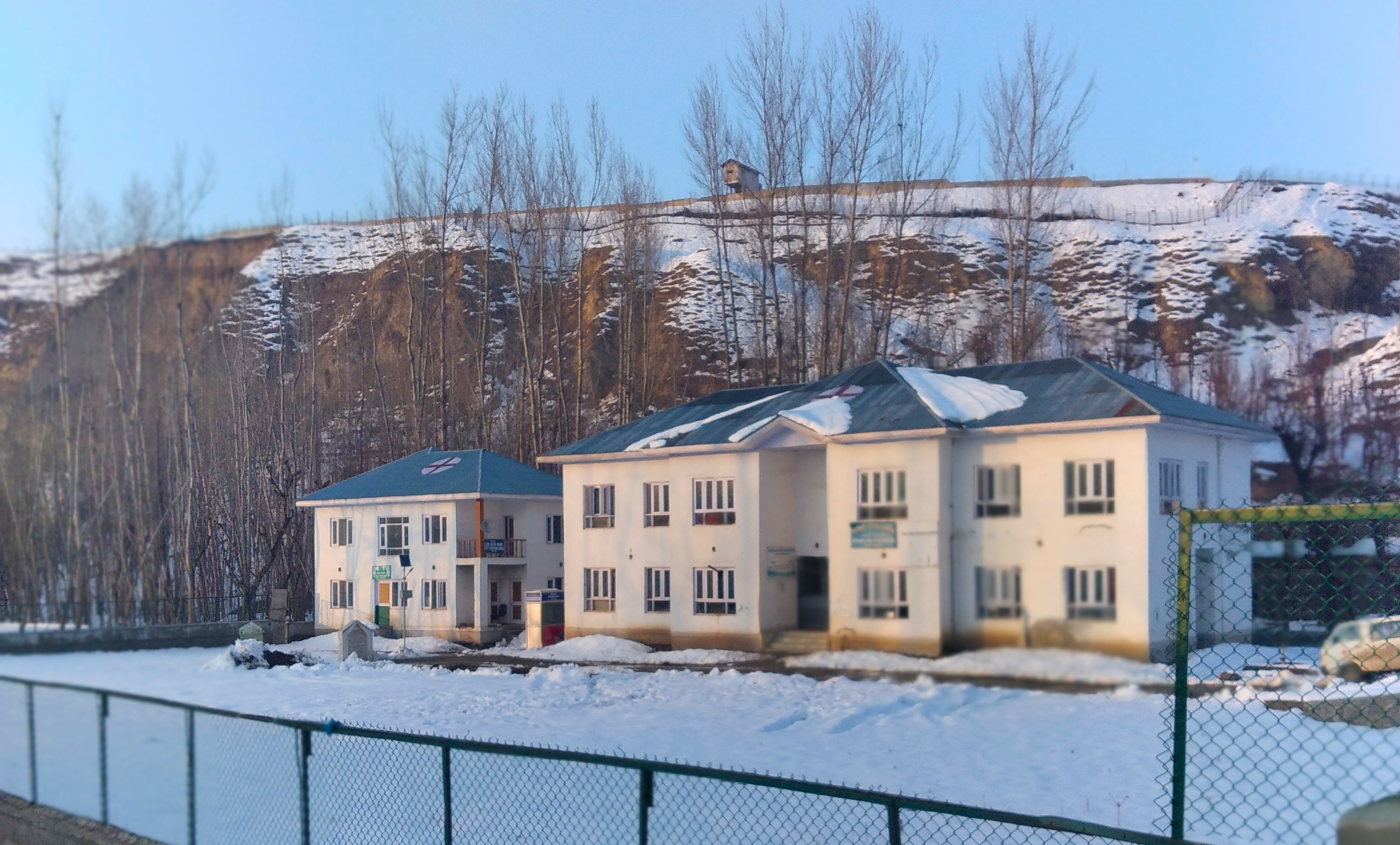
This image depicts Primary Health Center Ichgam. Photo taken in January 2021

== Attractions ==
The shrine of Haztat Abbas is located in Bungam area of the village Ichgam. It is also called Roza Hazrat Abul Fazel Abbass in the native language of the village. Every Thursday, a large number of people from the Shia sect of Islam visit here. It is one of the biggest landmark in the village.

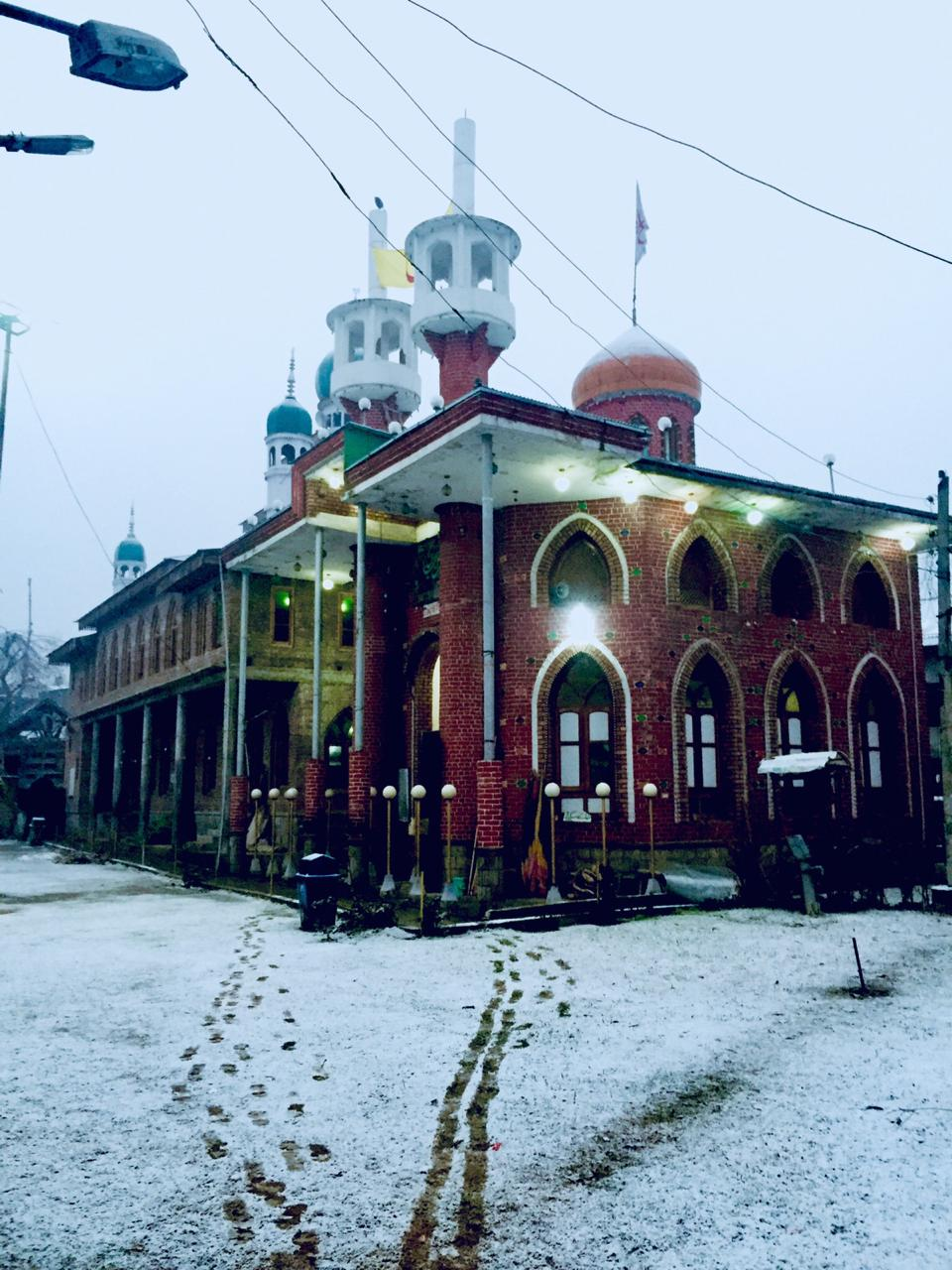
The shrine of Hazrat Abbas in Ichgam.

== Sports ==
Cricket, football, and badminton are the most played sports in Ichgam. Cricket, being the most popular sport in India, is also played on a large scale in Ichgam. In brick kilns, on playgrounds; anywhere we can see the children and adults of Ichgam playing cricket in mid summer. Tournaments are organized and people take a part in them by spectating, cheering or by directly participating in them.

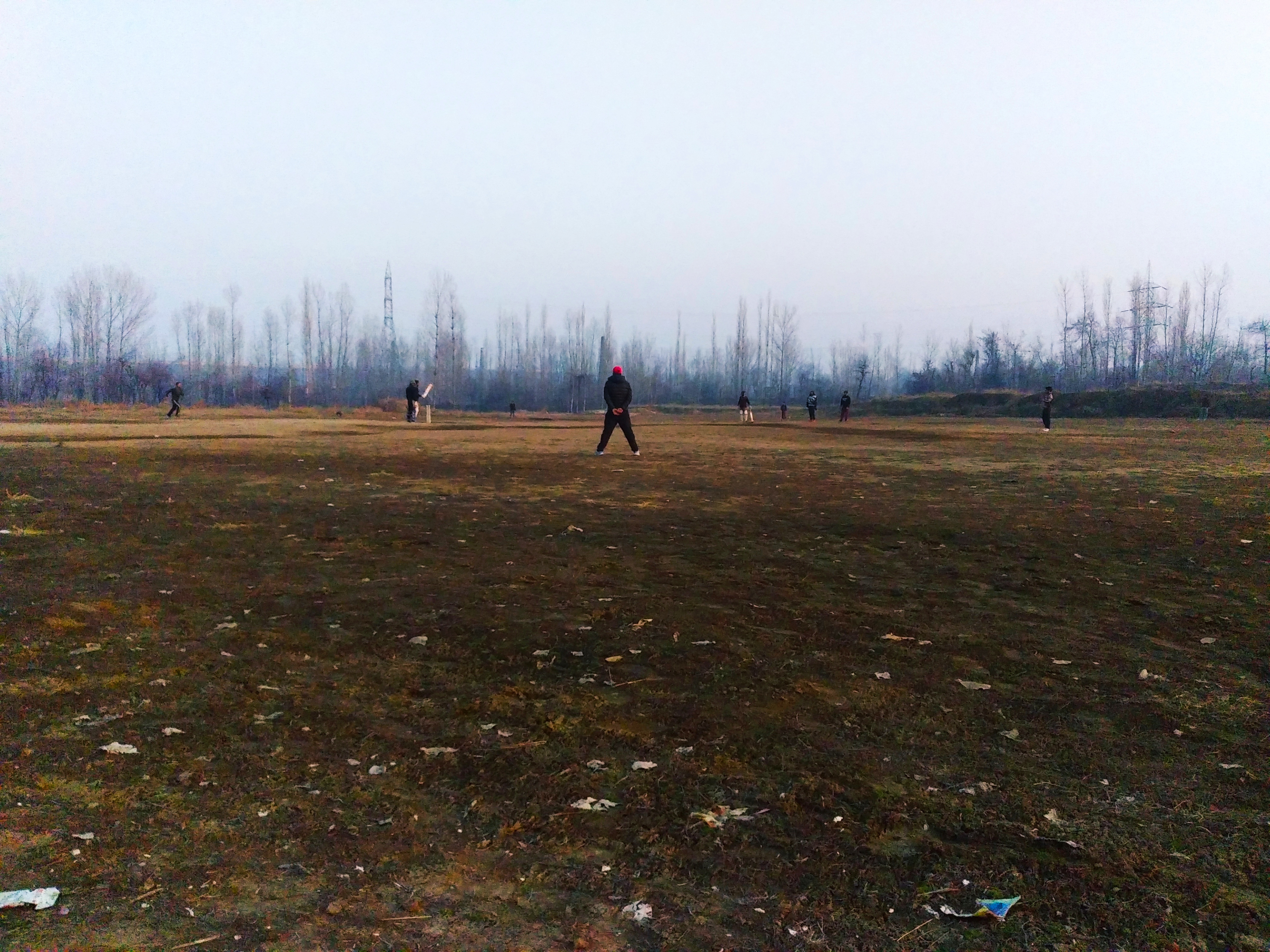
People playing cricket in Brick kilns in Ichgam

== Transport ==
=== Roads ===
Ichgam town falls on Budgam- Khansahib road. It is connected to many other villages and townships by a network of roads. To link Ichgam with Ompora, Zori Bhag, Qazi Bagh and Budgam internally, a new link road is being built by the government. This link will be completed by 2021 and will reduce distance between these places.

Roads in the Ichgam village are Macadamized but still some roads are not properly built. In ending 2020, some roads near Roza Hazrat Abbass (as) were Mecadamized.

=== Railway ===
To present date, there is no railway line connecting Ichgam with other places. The nearest railway station to the Ichgam village is Budgam railway station, located in Ompora, nearly 2.5 km (1.6 mi) away from district headquarters, Budgam.

=== Airport ===
The nearest airport to Ichgam is Srinagar International Airport, also called Budgam Airbase.

== Old suffering ==
Prior to December 2020, the villagers of Ichgam used to face a routinely problem. The Airforce Base Camp is located next to the Sheikh ul-Alam International Airport . The gunshots that came from this camp used to hit many houses in Wolina, a part of Ichgam. On 11 December 2020, a female inhabitant (Fatima Begum) was hit by the bullet in her right leg while she was washing vegetables in her kitchen. The bullet had pierced the roof of her house and had been fired by the Airforce personnel during their routine firing drills. It was the daily routine of the air force personnel to conduct their firing drill in the same direction as of the Wolina area of the village. This had put the lives of villagers at the risk of death. Even after reaching many officials, nobody seemed to care about the ordeals of villagers.

The injury of Fatima sparked off a protest in Ichgam. Many people (men and women) blocked the Budgam-Khansahib and Budgam-Chadoora road demanding a quick action against Air force personnel who are involved in the incident. Many officials including Deputy Commissioner Budgam, SHO Budgam and the Tehsildar also visited the place after and during the protests.

Later on an FIR was filed by the Police Station Budgam and the routine of firing drill was closed by the administration.

== Telecom services ==
The Ichgam village is connected through telecom services to the entire world. Airtel, Bsnl, Vodafone, and Reliance Jio are the main telecom service providers in this area. On 21 February 2018, Aircel stopped its services in the whole country. The local subscribers also affected in this village.

Religions
Religion	Percentage
Muslims	98.71%
Hindu	0.98%
Others	0.31%
Distribution of population on religion.

Demography
Gender	Percent
Male ♂	51.00%
Female ♀	49.00%
Male and female population

== See also ==
- Dooniwari
- Budgam
- Srinagar
- Budgam Airbase
- Chadoora
- Khansahib
