= Aga Sahib Shrine =

Islamic shrine in Budgam, Jammu and Kashmir, India

- آغا صاحب آستان

- Location within Jammu and Kashmir Location within India

Religion
- Affiliation: Islam
- Ecclesiastical or organizational status: Active
- Leadership: Anjuman Sharie Shian Jammu & Kashmir Darul Mustafa and Yousuf Abad
- Patron: Aga Syed Hassan Al-Moosavi; Aga Syed Hadi Al-Moosavi
- Year consecrated: 1930
- Status: Active

Location
- Municipality: Budgam
- State: Jammu and Kashmir
- Country: India
- Interactive map of Aga Sahib Shrine
- Coordinates: 34°00′54″N 74°43′19″E

Architecture
- Type: Islamic architecture
- Style: Classical
- Founder: Aga Syed Yusuf Al-Moosavi Al-Safavi
- Completed: 2000
- Construction cost: Rs. 1 Crore

Specifications
- Length: 82 feet (25 m)
- Width: 49 feet (15 m)
- Height (max): 25 feet (7.6 m)
- Dome: 02
- Dome height (outer): 8 feet (2.4 m)
- Dome height (inner): 6 feet (1.8 m)
- Dome dia. (outer): 5 feet (1.5 m)
- Dome dia. (inner): 4 feet (1.2 m)
- Minaret: 1
- Minaret height: 10 feet (3.0 m)

Website
- www.raheislam.org/agashrine

Aga Sahib Shrine or Ziyarat e Sarkaar or Aga Mehdi Shrine is a religious place of Kashmiri Muslims located at Budgam. In this shrine there are many religious personalities buried include Ayatullah-ul- Uzma Aga Syed Mehdi Al-Mosvi Al-Safvi Al-Najafi, Aga Syed Ahmad Al-Mosvi Al-Safvi Al-Najafi, Aga Syed Yusuf Al-Moosavi Al-Safavi, Aga Syed Mohammad Fazlullah, Aga Syed Mehdi Mustafa, Aga Syed Mustafa Al-Moosavi and others. This shrine is situated on the karewas of Budgam which is about 100 feet (30 m) high. The shrine was constructed by Aga Syed Yousuf himself during his lifetime to honor Sarkar Aga Syed Mehdi Al-Moosavi, who was also Aga Syed Yousuf's grandfather.

== See also ==
- Tomb of Shams-ud-Din Araqi
- Aga Syed Hadi
