= Wahabpora =

Village in Jammu and Kashmir, India

- Village
- Location in Budgam, Jammu and Kashmir Wahabpora (India)
- Coordinates: 34°03′25″N 74°39′36″E
- Country: India
- State: Jammu and Kashmir
- District: Budgam
- Elevation: 1,610 m (5,280 ft)

Population (2011)
  - Total: 14,000

Languages
  - Official: Kashmiri, Urdu, Hindi, Dogri, English
- Time zone: UTC+5:30 (IST)
- PIN: 191111
- Telephone code: 01951
- Vehicle registration: JK04
- Sex ratio: 860♀/1000♂ (2011)
- Literacy: 90.91% (2011)
- Website: budgam.nic.in
- Wahabpora means village of providers

Wahabpora is a village in district Budgam in Indian administered union territory of Jammu and Kashmir, India. Situated on the banks of Aihaji River (Bada Ara/Gam kuel), Wahabpora is about 10 kilometres (6.2 mi) away from the district headquarters Budgam and 21 kilometres (13 mi) from Srinagar, the summer capital of Jammu and Kashmir. The village Wahabpora consists of about six mohallahs— Peer Mohallah (Mosvey Abad), Taingapora, Watipora, Ganaiepora, New Colony and Chinar colony.

It is necessary to describe that Chinar colony was a part of Mosviabad and Al-Mehdi Chowk is the famous region of Chinar colony, the colony which is the central part of the village where five big chinars, about the age five hundred years old are present. The brother in law of Mughal King Jahangir and that time Governor of Kashmir Asif Khan had planted these five chinars. Chinar Garden of Wahabpora is also known as “Asif Ali Khan Bagh”. Gariend is the neighbouring village to Wahabpora. Famous plane crushing event occurred near this place is also known as Gariend-Wahabpora plane crashing event-2019.

== Geography ==
The area of the village is about 6 km^{2} (2.3 sq mi) which is the total area of the village captured by residential land, deep wet land (Nambal/daldal), Agricultural land and dry high land (Wuder) etc. It contains 600 hectares (1,500 acres) of total land. It has an average elevation of 1,610 metres (5,280 ft). This village consists of many sects of Islam like as Shias, Sunnis and Noorbakshia Islam . Literacy rate of this village is 91.90%.

== Al-Mehdi Chowk ==
Al-Mehdi Chowk is the central part of Wahabpora. This area is named after 12th Shia Imam Imam Mahdi. This area consists of head offices of many organisations like as Almehdi Islamic Library, Raheislam Organisation, Ali Asgar a.s. Relief Trust, JK Bank Khidmat Centre, Mosvi Computers, Mosiviyat Enclave, Mosvey Abad and Matam-Sarai Asadshah Peermohlla. Mosvey Cemetery is also located in this region. This area playing an important role for economy and culture of the village. It is called the Business Hub of Wahabpora. It is also the centre of Islam Naab.

== Wahabpora ==
=== Meaning of Wahabpora ===
The name Wahabpora is made of two words: Wahab and Pora, Wahab is a name of Allah which means provider or one who gives and in common language Pora is used to indicate any region, village or town. So Wahabpora means region of providers which provides humanitarian services to all.

=== Shrine of Aga Mir Mosavi ===
In this village there is a shrine situated near the main bus stand. A renowned scholar and a'alim Aga Mir Syed Mohammad Baqir Mosavi is buried here. The shrine is surrounded with cemented wall and the colour of the shrine is dark green. Famous marsiya khani Astan Bandar is held here.

== Schools ==
- Government Higher Secondary School, Wahabpora
- Government Primary Boys School, Wahabpora
- Government Primary Girls School, Wahabpora
- Imamia Public High School, Wahabpora
- Geo Professional School, Wahabpora
- Raheislam Educational Organisation, Wahabpora
- Tanzeemul Makatib A, B and C, Wahabpora

== Religious organisations ==
- Raheislam Organisation and Library
- Idarah Islamia Al-Mehdi a.s. and Library
- Ali Asgar a.s. Relief Trust and Blood Bank
- Hussaini a.s. Relief Committee
- Al-Asr a.s Relief Committee
- Markazi Waqk Committee

== Festivals ==
Many Majlis and festivals are celebrated here like as Nauroz, Ashoora, Sham-i-Ghareban, Eid-ul-Fitr, Eid-ul-Azha, Eid-i-Ghadeer, Shab-e-Meraj and Astan Bandar etc. Wahabpora is famous for the annual marsiya khani Astan Bandar.

== Telecom services ==
This village is connected through the telecom services to the entire world. Airtel, Bsnl, Vodafone-Idea, and Reliance Jio are the main telecom service providers in this area. On 21 February 2018 Aircel stopped its services in the whole country. The local subscribers also affected in this village.

== Transport ==
Wahabpora is connected through roads via Budgam, Magam, Bemina, Srinagar and Beerwah.

=== Railway ===
The nearest railway station is at Budgam Budgam Railway Station.

=== Airport ===
The nearest airport is Srinagar International Airport.

== Stadium ==
The Maidan Stadium is Wahabpora's biggest sports venue. It was modelled by cutting down at least 100 wallnut trees.

== Profession data ==
Number of Employees in Education Department	130
Number of Employees in Health Department	34
Number of Employees in Defence	409
Number of Employees in Judiciary	07
Number of Employees in Agriculture	23
Number of Employees in other departments	214
Number of farmers	2,023
Number of private Employees	250
Number of businessmen and shopkeers	149
Number of person with other occupations	561

== Gallery ==
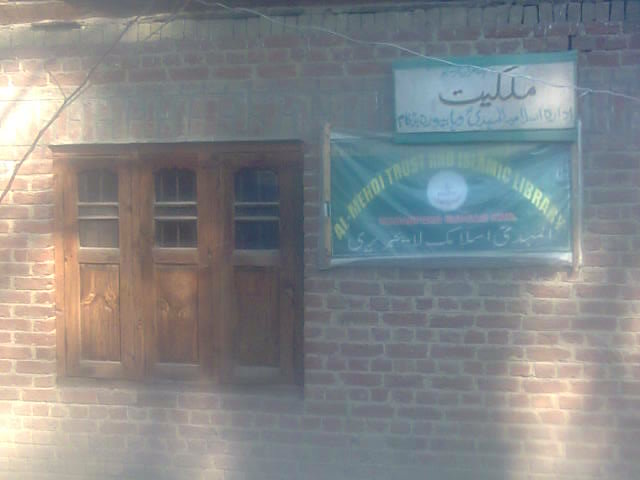
Idarah Islamia Al-Mehdi a.s. Library, Al-Mehdi a.s. Chowk, Wahabpora

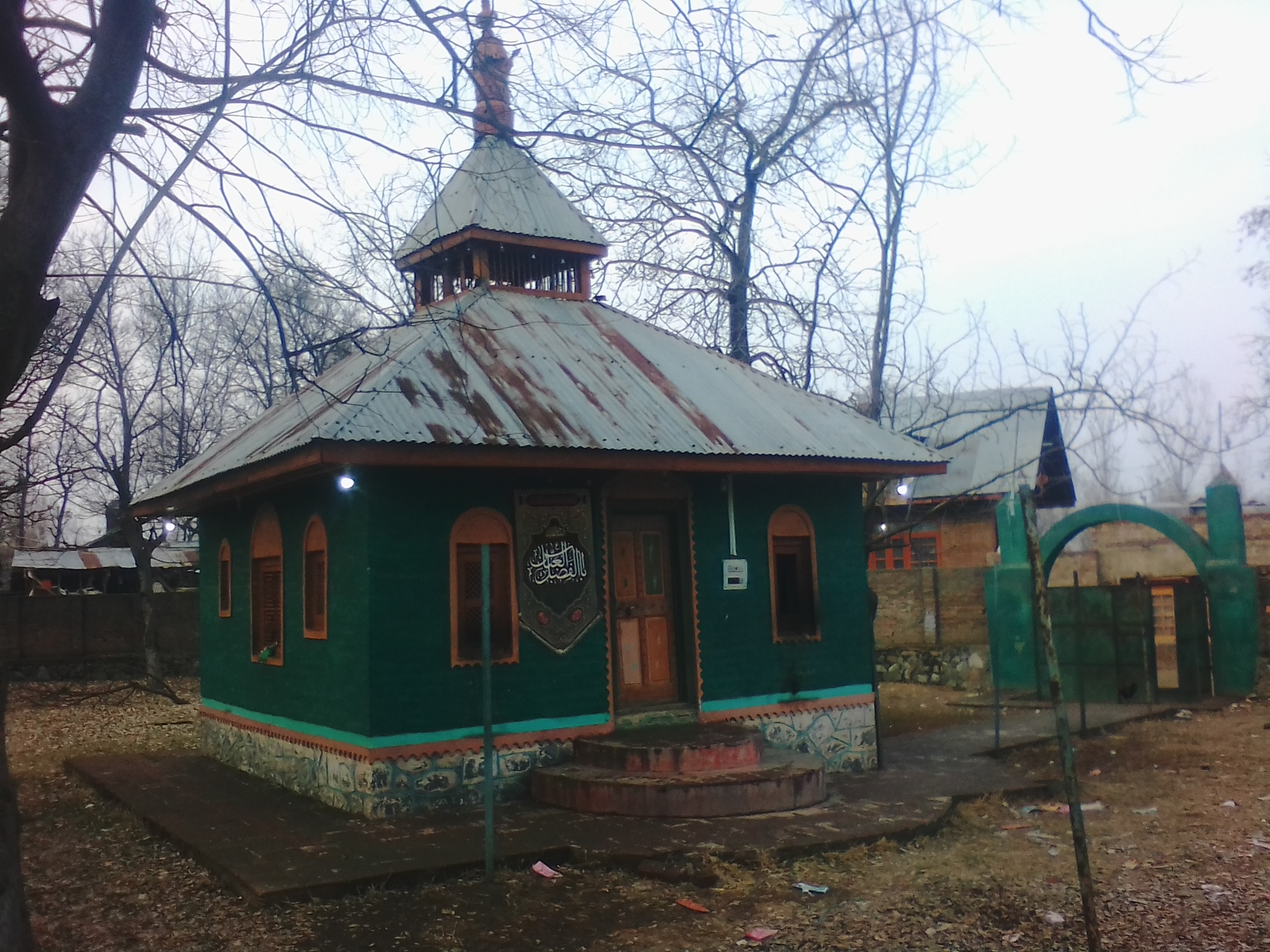
Astan Aaliyah of Mir Aga Syed Mohammad Baqir Moosavi

Religions
Religion	Percent
Shia Muslims	90%
Sunni Muslims	5%
Noorbakh Shia	5%
Others	0%
Distribution of population on religion.

Demography
	Percent
Male ♂	55.00%
Female ♀	45.00%
Male and female population

Land-Distribution
Land	Percent
Agricultural	50%
Residential	30%
Pastures	10%
Barren	10%
Distribution of land.

Wahabpora: mother-tongue of population.
1. Kashmiri (70.0%)
2. Urdu (20.0%)
3. English (0.00%)
4. other (0.00%)
