= Nasrullahpora =

Village in Budgam district, Jammu and Kashmir

- Village
- Location in Jammu and Kashmir, India
- Coordinates: 34°02′38″N 74°42′13″E
- Country: India
- Union Territory: Jammu and Kashmir
- District: Budgam

Population (2011)
  - Total: 3,793
- Postal code: 191111

Nasrullahpora is a village in the Budgam district of the union territory of Jammu and Kashmir, India. It falls under the Budgam tehsil and is administered by a local Gram Panchayat. The village postal PIN code is 191111.

== History ==
Nasrullahpora is believed to be named after Baba Nasr, a spiritual figure associated with the region.

On 13 July 1992, an incident resulting in the deaths of ten civilians occurred in the Budgam area following a militant attack on an Indian Army unit in the vicinity. According to police records, a case was registered as FIR No. 61/1992 at Police Station Budgam under Section 302 of the Ranbir Penal Code (RPC) along with provisions of the Terrorist and Disruptive Activities (Prevention) Act (TADA) and the Indian Arms Act.

== Geography ==
Nasrullahpora is situated in the central part of the Kashmir Valley. It is connected to Budgam town and nearby villages through local road networks.

== Demographics ==
According to the 2011 Census of India, Nasrullahpora has a rural population comprising 3793 residents. Kashmiri is the primary spoken language, and the majority of the population practices Islam.

== Education ==
The village has the following government educational institutions:

- Government Boys High School
- Government Girls High School
- Government Primary School

== Healthcare ==
Nasrullahpora is served by a Primary Health Centre (PHC), which provides basic healthcare services.

== Administration ==
Nasrullahpora is governed by an elected Gram Panchayat. The village has two Panchayat Ghars (A and B), used for administrative work and community meetings.

== Transport ==
Nasrullahpora is connected to Budgam town and nearby areas through local road networks. Public transport and private vehicles are commonly used for travel to nearby towns including Budgam and Srinagar.

== Notable places ==
- Shrine of Baba Naseeb-ud-Din Ghazi
- Jamia Masjid Nasrullahpora
