= Budgam Assembly constituency =

Constituency of the Jammu and Kashmir Legislative Assembly

Coordinates: 34.018°N 74.719°E

Budgam
- Constituency No. 27 for the Jammu and Kashmir Legislative Assembly

Constituency details
- Country: India
- State: Jammu and Kashmir
- District: Budgam
- Lok Sabha constituency: Srinagar
- Established: 1962

Member of Legislative Assembly
- Incumbent Aga Syed Muntazir Mehdi
- Party: JKPDP
- Elected year: 2025
- Preceded by: Omar Abdullah

Budgam Assembly constituency is one of the 90 constituencies in the Jammu and Kashmir Legislative Assembly of Jammu and Kashmir a north state of India. Budgam is also part of Baramulla Lok Sabha constituency.

== Members of the Legislative Assembly ==
| Election | Member | Party |
|---|---|---|
| 1962 | Aga Syed Ali Safvi | Jammu & Kashmir National Conference |
| 1967 | H. S. Mehdi | Jammu & Kashmir National Conference |
| 1972 | Ali Mohammad Mir | Indian National Congress |
| 1977 | Syed Ghulam Hussain Gilani | Jammu & Kashmir National Conference |
| 1983 | Syed Ghulam Hussain Gilani | Jammu & Kashmir National Conference |
| 1987 | Syed Ghulam Hussain Gilani | Jammu & Kashmir National Conference |
| 1996 | Syed Ghulam Hussain Gilani | Jammu & Kashmir National Conference |
| 2002 | Aga Syed Ruhullah Mehdi | Jammu & Kashmir National Conference |
| 2008 | Aga Syed Ruhullah Mehdi | Jammu & Kashmir National Conference |
| 2014 | Aga Syed Ruhullah Mehdi | Jammu & Kashmir National Conference |
| 2024 | Omar Abdullah | Jammu & Kashmir National Conference |
| 2025^ | Aga Syed Muntazir Mehdi | Jammu and Kashmir People's Democratic Party |

- ^ denotes by-election

== Election results ==
=== 2025 by-election ===
Jammu and Kashmir Legislative Assembly by-election, 2025: Budgam
| Party | Candidate | Votes | % | ±% |
|---|---|---|---|---|
| JKPDP | Aga Syed Muntazir Mehdi | 21,576 | 34.19 | ▲7.66 |
| JKNC | Aga Syed Mahmood Al-Mosavi | 17,098 | 27.10 | ▼27.42 |
| Independent | Jibran Dar | 7,152 | 11.33 | |
| JKAIP | Nazir Ahmad Khan | 3,089 | 4.90 | ▲7.66 |
| BJP | Aga Syed Mohsin Mosvi | 2,619 | 4.15 | ▲2.14 |
| Independent | Sameer Bhat | 2,534 | 4.15 | |
| NOTA | None of the Above | 544 | 0.86 | |
| AAP | Deeba Khan | 459 | 0.73 | |
| Majority | | 4,478 | 7.09 | |
| Turnout | | 63,099 | 50.02 | |
| JKPDP gain from JKNC | | Swing | ▲7.66 | |

=== Assembly Election 2024 ===
2024 Jammu and Kashmir Legislative Assembly election : Budgam
| Party | Candidate | Votes | % | ±% |
|---|---|---|---|---|
| JKNC | Omar Abdullah | 36,010 | 54.52 | New |
| JKPDP | Aga Syed Muntazir Mehdi | 17,525 | 26.53 | ▼13.18 |
| JKPDF | Nisar Ahmad Pal | 3,365 | 5.09 | ▼4.19 |
| Independent | Mehraj Ud Din Ganayee | 3,358 | 5.08 | New |
| NOTA | None of the Above | 1,757 | 2.66 | ▲2.13 |
| Independent | Mukhtar Ahmad Dar | 1,674 | 2.53 | New |
| Independent | Nazir Ahmad Wani | 1,583 | 2.40 | New |
| JKANC | Aga Syed Ahmad Moosvi | 524 | 0.79 | New |
| Margin of victory | | 18,485 | 27.99 | ▲23.93 |
| Turnout | | 66,052 | 52.68 | ▼13.64 |
| Registered electors | | 1,25,394 | | ▲20.94 |
| JKNC hold | | Swing | ▲10.76 | |

=== Assembly Election 2014 ===
2014 Jammu and Kashmir Legislative Assembly election : Budgam
| Party | Candidate | Votes | % | ±% |
|---|---|---|---|---|
| JKNC | Aga Syed Ruhullah Mehdi | 30,090 | 43.76 | ▲3.61 |
| JKPDP | Ghulam Mohi-Ud-Din Bhat (Muntazir) | 27,303 | 39.71 | ▲19.91 |
| JKPDF | Fayaz Ahmad Dar | 6,387 | 9.29 | New |
| JKPC | Mohammed Kamal Malik | 2,342 | 3.41 | New |
| BJP | Mir Fayaz Rahat | 880 | 1.28 | ▼0.87 |
| Independent | Rafiq Ahmad Dar | 872 | 1.27 | New |
| INC | Ghulam Hussain Geelani | 520 | 0.76 | ▼1.93 |
| NOTA | None of the Above | 364 | 0.53 | New |
| Margin of victory | | 2,787 | 4.05 | ▼16.30 |
| Turnout | | 68,758 | 66.32 | ▲11.15 |
| Registered electors | | 1,03,683 | | ▲16.87 |
| JKNC hold | | Swing | ▲3.61 | |

=== Assembly Election 2008 ===
2008 Jammu and Kashmir Legislative Assembly election : Budgam
| Party | Candidate | Votes | % | ±% |
|---|---|---|---|---|
| JKNC | Aga Syed Ruhullah Mehdi | 19,652 | 40.15 | ▼10.43 |
| JKPDP | Mohammed Kamal Malik | 9,692 | 19.80 | ▲2.57 |
| Independent | Aga Syed Mahmood Al-Mosavi | 8,383 | 17.13 | New |
| JKPDF | Hakim Mohammad Yaseen | 5,952 | 12.16 | New |
| INC | Mir Fayaz Rahat | 1,315 | 2.69 | ▼0.71 |
| BJP | Mohammad Ashraf Azad Hajam | 1,051 | 2.15 | ▼2.09 |
| Independent | Nazir Ahmad Wani | 528 | 1.08 | New |
| JKANC | Ghulam Nabi Ganai | 382 | 0.78 | New |
| AIFB | Manzoor Ahmad Badoo | 382 | 0.78 | New |
| Independent | Bashir Ahmad Najar | 366 | 0.75 | New |
| Margin of victory | | 9,960 | 20.35 | ▼9.14 |
| Turnout | | 48,942 | 55.17 | ▲21.76 |
| Registered electors | | 88,713 | | ▲31.52 |
| JKNC hold | | Swing | ▼10.43 | |

=== Assembly Election 2002 ===
2002 Jammu and Kashmir Legislative Assembly election : Budgam
| Party | Candidate | Votes | % | ±% |
|---|---|---|---|---|
| JKNC | Aga Syed Ruhullah Mehdi | 11,398 | 50.59 | ▲9.07 |
| Independent | Aga Syed Mahmood Al-Mosavi | 4,753 | 21.10 | New |
| JKPDP | Mohammed Kamal Malik | 3,883 | 17.23 | New |
| BJP | Hajam Mohammed Ashraf Azad | 955 | 4.24 | New |
| INC | Mukhtar Amreen Badar | 766 | 3.40 | ▼33.81 |
| Independent | Zahoor Ahmed Kotey | 427 | 1.90 | New |
| JD(U) | Abdul Aziz Wani | 349 | 1.55 | New |
| Margin of victory | | 6,645 | 29.49 | ▲25.18 |
| Turnout | | 22,531 | 33.41 | ▼30.36 |
| Registered electors | | 67,450 | | ▲16.23 |
| JKNC hold | | Swing | ▲9.07 | |

=== Assembly Election 1996 ===
1996 Jammu and Kashmir Legislative Assembly election : Budgam
| Party | Candidate | Votes | % | ±% |
|---|---|---|---|---|
| JKNC | Syed Ghulam Hussain Geelani | 15,360 | 41.51 | ▼3.45 |
| INC | Aga Syed Mahadi | 13,766 | 37.21 | New |
| JD | Roshan | 5,550 | 15.00 | New |
| JKAL | Mohammed Ashraf Hajam | 1,666 | 4.50 | New |
| Independent | Mohammed Jafer Hajam | 658 | 1.78 | New |
| Margin of victory | | 1,594 | 4.31 | ▼10.80 |
| Turnout | | 37,000 | 67.27 | ▼17.73 |
| Registered electors | | 58,029 | | ▲12.44 |
| JKNC hold | | Swing | ▼3.45 | |

=== Assembly Election 1987 ===
1987 Jammu and Kashmir Legislative Assembly election : Budgam
| Party | Candidate | Votes | % | ±% |
|---|---|---|---|---|
| JKNC | Syed Ghulam Hussain Geelani | 18,911 | 44.96 | ▼10.70 |
| Independent | Mohammed Sultan Bhat | 12,556 | 29.85 | New |
| Independent | Aga Syed Mahadi | 10,592 | 25.18 | New |
| Margin of victory | | 6,355 | 15.11 | ▼13.14 |
| Turnout | | 42,059 | 82.74 | ▲9.27 |
| Registered electors | | 51,611 | | ▲21.79 |
| JKNC hold | | Swing | | |

=== Assembly Election 1983 ===
1983 Jammu and Kashmir Legislative Assembly election : Budgam
| Party | Candidate | Votes | % | ±% |
|---|---|---|---|---|
| JKNC | Syed Ghulam Hussain Geelani | 17,037 | 55.67 | ▲5.83 |
| INC | Assadullah Mir | 8,392 | 27.42 | ▲24.43 |
| JI | Mohammed Sultan Bhat | 2,971 | 9.71 | ▲3.58 |
| JKNC | Ghulam Hussain Bhat | 2,014 | 6.58 | ▼43.25 |
| Independent | Ali Mohammed Bhat | 192 | 0.63 | New |
| Margin of victory | | 8,645 | 28.25 | ▲19.46 |
| Turnout | | 30,606 | 75.93 | ▼8.55 |
| Registered electors | | 42,376 | | ▲19.08 |
| JKNC hold | | Swing | ▲5.83 | |

=== Assembly Election 1977 ===
1977 Jammu and Kashmir Legislative Assembly election : Budgam
| Party | Candidate | Votes | % | ±% |
|---|---|---|---|---|
| JKNC | Syed Ghulam Hussain Geelani | 14,324 | 49.83 | New |
| JP | Aga Sayeed Hassan | 11,799 | 41.05 | New |
| JI | Mohamed Yousuf Shah | 1,761 | 6.13 | New |
| INC | Ghulam Hassan Dar | 860 | 2.99 | ▼45.88 |
| Margin of victory | | 2,525 | 8.78 | ▼5.85 |
| Turnout | | 28,744 | 84.54 | ▲20.49 |
| Registered electors | | 35,587 | | ▲24.10 |
| JKNC gain from INC | | Swing | ▲0.96 | |

=== Assembly Election 1972 ===
1972 Jammu and Kashmir Legislative Assembly election : Budgam
| Party | Candidate | Votes | % | ±% |
|---|---|---|---|---|
| INC | Ali Mohammed Mir | 8,448 | 48.87 | ▲25.24 |
| Independent | Aga Sayed Ali Shah Safvi | 5,918 | 34.24 | New |
| Independent | Mirza Gh Hassan Beg | 2,041 | 11.81 | New |
| Independent | Abdul Aziz Paray | 483 | 2.79 | New |
| Independent | Sayed Manzoor Ahmad | 396 | 2.29 | New |
| Margin of victory | | 2,530 | 14.64 | ▼25.84 |
| Turnout | | 17,286 | 62.26 | ▲21.52 |
| Registered electors | | 28,675 | | ▲14.03 |
| INC gain from JKNC | | Swing | ▼15.24 | |

=== Assembly Election 1967 ===
1967 Jammu and Kashmir Legislative Assembly election : Budgam
| Party | Candidate | Votes | % | ±% |
|---|---|---|---|---|
| JKNC | H. S. Mehdi | 6,250 | 64.12 | ▼30.96 |
| INC | M. S. Ali | 2,304 | 23.64 | New |
| CPI | A. Dar | 1,194 | 12.25 | New |
| Margin of victory | | 3,946 | 40.48 | ▼49.67 |
| Turnout | | 9,748 | 41.03 | ▼39.37 |
| Registered electors | | 25,146 | | ▼0.21 |
| JKNC hold | | Swing | ▼30.96 | |

=== Assembly Election 1962 ===
1962 Jammu and Kashmir Legislative Assembly election : Budgam
| Party | Candidate | Votes | % | ±% |
|---|---|---|---|---|
| JKNC | Aga Syed Ali Safvi | 18,719 | 95.07 | New |
| Independent | Ghulam Nabi Wani Gohar | 970 | 4.93 | New |
| Margin of victory | | 17,749 | 90.15 | |
| Turnout | | 19,689 | 80.18 | |
| Registered electors | | 25,200 | | |
| JKNC win (new seat) | | | | |

== See also ==
- Budgam
- List of constituencies of Jammu and Kashmir Legislative Assembly
