= Aga Syed Mohammad Fazlullah =

Scholar and Aa'lim from Jammu & Kashmir, India

Aga Syed Mohammad Fazlullah Moosavi
- Title: Aga Sahib

Personal life
- Born: 26 November 1947 Budgam, Jammu and Kashmir, India
- Died: 29 January 2018 (aged 70) Budgam, Jammu and Kashmir, India
- Children: Aga Syed Mohammad Hadi
- Other name: Aga Fazlullah

Religious life
- Religion: Islam, Shia

Senior posting
- Based in: Budgam
- Post: Cleric
- Period in office: 1982–2018
- Predecessor: Aga Syed Yusuf Al-Moosavi Al-Safavi
- Successor: Aga Syed Mohammad Hadi Almoosavi

Military service
- Website: www.imamhussainresearch.com/agasyed-mohammad-fazlullah.php

Aga Syed Mohammad Fazlullah Al-Moosavi Al-Safavi (26 November 1947 – 29 January 2018) was a Kashmiri Shia scholar and cleric. He was the son of Aga Syed Yusuf Al-Moosavi Al-Safavi, president of Anjuman Sharie Shiyan (B), a member of the World Ahlbayt Assembly and chairman of the Yusuf Memorial Trust. He was the maternal uncle of senior Hurrayat leader and president of Anjuman-e-Sharie Shiyan (A) Aga Syed Hassan Moosavi Budgami, and the elder brother of the member of the Legislative Council (MLC) and former education minister Aga Syed Mehmood Moosavi.

== Education ==
He got his basic religious education from his father and Babul Elim Budgam. His medium of education was Persian and Arabic. He travelled Iran and Iraq for further studies. He was alma mater of Howza Elmia Najaf and Howza Elmia Qom.

== Services ==
He was a public speaker. His speeches were very attractive. He made Kashmir's largest Imam Bargah at Bemina, Budgam. He wrote many articles in Urdu, Persian and Kashmiri. He served as Judge in the Sharie court at Budgam. He served as religious cleric and spread Islam Naab. He tried to unite the Muslim Ummah in Kashmir and organised many conferences on it.

== Death ==
He died of lung cancer on 29 January 2018 in Budgam. About 80,000 persons attended his funeral procession, and the funeral prayer was led by Aga Syed Mohammad Baqir Al-Moosavi Al-Najfi. He was buried in Astan Shreef at Budgam. Many political and religious leaders sent condolences on his demise. Raheislam Organisation announced mourning for four days on the demise of Aga Sahib.
