= Tomb of Shams-ud-Din Araqi =

Islamic shrine in Chadoora, Budgam, India

Tomb of Mir Shams-ud-Din Araqi
- آستانہ میر شمس الدین اراکی
- Internal view of the shrine

- Location within Jammu and Kashmir Location within India

Religion
- Affiliation: Islam
- Ecclesiastical or organizational status: Active
- Leadership: Anjuman Sharie Shian Jammu & Kashmir Darul Mustafa
- Patron: Aga Syed Hassan Al-Moosavi
- Year consecrated: 1910
- Status: Active

Location
- Municipality: Chadoora, Budgam
- State: Jammu and Kashmir
- Country: India
- Interactive map of Tomb of Mir Shams-ud-Din Araqi
- Coordinates: 33°48′N 75°06′E

Architecture
- Type: Islamic architecture
- Style: Classical
- Founder: Aga Syed Yusuf Al-Moosavi Al-Safavi
- Completed: Progress
- Construction cost: Rs. 50 lacs

Specifications
- Length: 98 feet (30 m)
- Width: 66 feet (20 m)
- Height (max): 25 feet (7.6 m)
- Dome: 01
- Dome height (outer): 10 feet (3.0 m)
- Dome height (inner): 08 feet (2.4 m)
- Dome dia. (outer): 07 feet (2.1 m)
- Dome dia. (inner): 05 feet (1.5 m)
- Minaret: 02
- Minaret height: 15 feet (4.6 m)

Website
- www.raheislam.org/agaaraqishrine

Tomb of Mir Shams-ud-Din Araqi or Ziyarat e Mir Shams-ud-Din Araqi or Araqi Shrine is a religious site of Kashmiri Muslims located at Chadoora, Budgam. In this shrine there is buried Mir Shams-ud-Din Araqi and Malik Hyder, a Kashmiri Historian. The shrine was constructed by Aga Syed Yousuf to honor Mir Shams-ud-Din Araqi.

== Background ==
Mir Syed Mohammad Isfani alias Mir Shams-ud-Din Araqi was an Iranian Sufi Muslim saint, known for having introduced the tenets held by Muhammad Noorbaksh Qahistani, a 15th-century Iranian Sufi who gave his name to the Noorbakshia school of Islam. Araqi was part of the order of Twelver Shia Sufis in Jammu and Kashmir who greatly influenced the social fabric of the Kashmir Valley and its surrounding regions.

Araqi died in 1515 and was buried at Zaddibal in Srinagar, Jammu and Kashmir. His body was later shifted to Chadoora for unknown reasons, where he is currently buried at the Araqi shrine. Araqi was a descendant of Musa al-Kadhim, the seventh Imam in Twelver Shia Islam.

== Friday prayers ==
People offer Friday prayers at the shrine. Majlis is also held at the shrine. People across the valley come here to visit the shrine. Anjuman e Sharie Shian is the custodian of the shrine.

== Architecture ==
This shrine is protected with cemented wall. There are many bathrooms attached to it. Many rooms have been built for pilgrims and travellers. The area of the shrine and its ground is about 10 kanals.

== See also ==
- Aga Sahib Shrine
- Persecution of Kashmiri Shias
- Tafazzul Husain Kashmiri
