= Aga Syed Ruhullah Mehdi =

Kashmiri politician (born 1976)

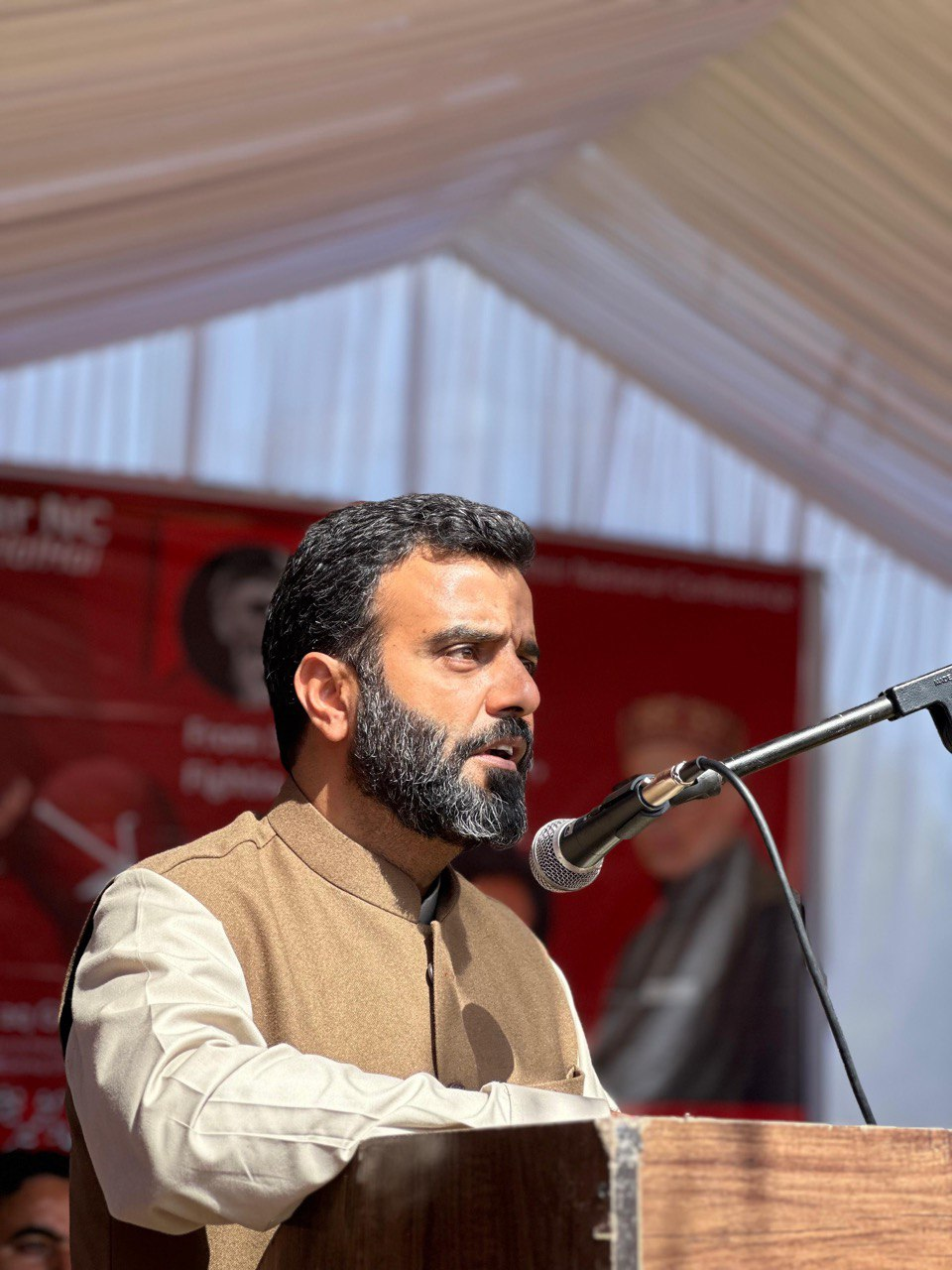
- Mehdi in 2024

Member of Parliament, Lok Sabha
- In office 4 June 2024 – 3 November 2026
- Preceded by: Farooq Abdullah
- Constituency: Srinagar

Member of Jammu and Kashmir Legislative Assembly
- In office 8 October 2002 – 10 July 2008
- Preceded by: Syed Ghulam Hussain Gilani
- Succeeded by: Omar Abdullah
- Constituency: Budgam

Member of Jammu and Kashmir Legislative Assembly
- In office 31 December 2014 – 12 November 2018
- Preceded by: Aga Syed Mehdi
- Succeeded by: Aga Syed Muntazir
- Constituency: Budgam

Cabinet Minister in Jammu and Kashmir
- In office 5 January 2009 – 8 October 2014
- Governor: N. N. Vohra
- Chief Minister: Omar Abdullah
- Ministry and Departments: Science and technology; Animal husbandry
- Succeeded by: Sajjad Gani Lone

Personal details
- Born: 19 September 1976 (age 50) Budgam, Jammu and Kashmir, India
- Party: Independent (2026–present)
- Other political affiliations: Jammu and Kashmir National Conference (2002–2026)
- Spouse: Nayereh Eslamiakram (m. 2024)
- Children: 1
- Parent: Aga Syed Mehdi (father)
- Education: Tyndale Biscoe School, University of Kashmir

Aga Syed Ruhullah Mehdi آغا سید روح اللہ مہدی(born 19 September 1976) is an Indian politician from Jammu and Kashmir who served as the Member of Parliament (MP) representing the Srinagar Lok Sabha constituency from 2024 to 2026. A former member of the Jammu and Kashmir National Conference, he previously served three terms as MLA from Budgam (2002–2019) and as a minister in the Jammu and Kashmir government (2008–2014). He is known for his opposition to the abrogation of Article 370 and resigned from the National Conference in November 2026 following disagreements with its leadership.

== Early life ==
Aga Syed Ruhullah Mehdi was born into a prominent religious and political family in Budgam, Jammu and Kashmir. His family, the Aga Family, has deep roots in the Shia Muslim community of the region, with a legacy of religious scholarship and leadership. His father, Aga Syed Mehdi, was a respected cleric and politician who played a significant role in the development of region's religious and political landscape.

Ruhullah Mehdi grew up in the environment of religious influence and political activism. He received his early education from Tyndale Biscoe School. After the untimely demise of his father in 2000, Ruhullah Mehdi stepped into politics.

== Political career ==
Aga Ruhullah's political career started in the year 2002, when he contested his first assembly election from Budgam and won. He continued his winning streak in 2008 and 2014. In 2009, he was inducted in the State Cabinet and became the youngest ever cabinet Minister in India. Mehdi was nominated as the Chief Spokesperson of the National Conference in 2015. However, after Article 370 was repealed on 5 August 2019, he disassociated himself from the party's stand and accused the party of remaining silent over the circumstances in Jammu and Kashmir after August 5. He resigned from the post of chief spokesperson on 28 July 2020.

In 2024 Lok Sabha elections, Mehdi contested from Srinagar constituency as National Conference candidate and won with a margin of 1.8 lakh votes.

On 3 November 2026, Aga Syed Ruhullah Mehdi announced his resignation from the post of Member of Parliament representing the Srinagar Lok Sabha constituency, citing ideological differences and dissatisfaction with the party leadership.

== Electoral performance ==
Position	Election	Constituency	Party	Result	Votes %	Opposition Candidate	Opposition Party	Margin	Ref
Member of Legislative Assembly	2002	Budgam	Jammu and Kashmir National Conference	Won	50.59%	Aga Syed Mehmood		6645	
Member of Legislative Assembly	2008	Budgam	Jammu and Kashmir National Conference	Won	40.15%	Mohammad Kamal Malik		9960	
Member of Legislative Assembly	2014	Budgam	Jammu and Kashmir National Conference	Won	43.76%	Ghulam Mohi-ud-Din Bhat		2787	
Member of Parliament,(Lok Sabha)	2024	Srinagar	Jammu and Kashmir National Conference	Won	52.85%	Waheed Para		188416	

== Achievements ==
Aga Ruhullah, shot into prominence after 2019 for his outspoken and fiery speeches, against the abrogation of Article 370. In the Year 2006, he was Chosen by the US embassy for International Visitors Leadership Program in USA as youngest Indian Legislator. In 2010, he was awarded by Network 18, CNN-IBN as the Youngest Indian Leader.

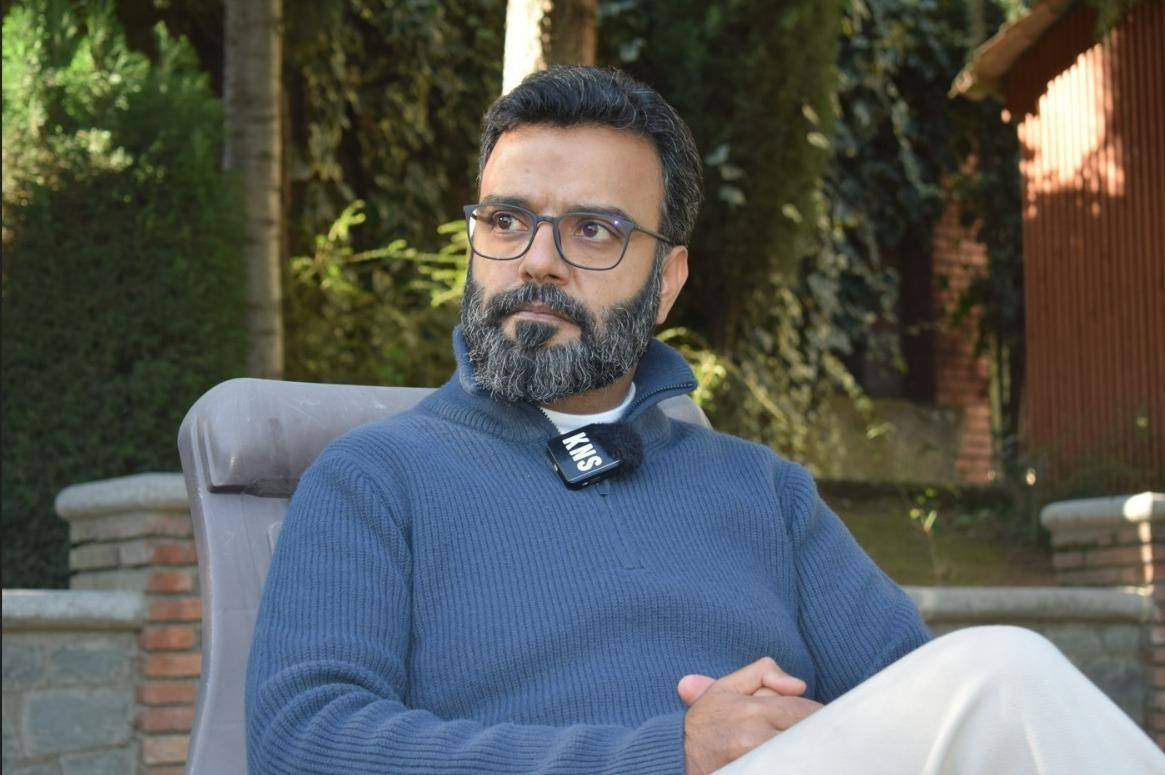

== In Parliament ==
- Raised the issues with different Ministries MoHFW INDIA regarding NHM doctors and paramedical. Also requested for CT scans in all district hospitals of J&K, particularly in Pulwama - Shopian & Budgam - Gandarbal district hospitals.
- Demanded release of the hundreds of prisoners of J&K who are held without trials for years and also asked for the transfer of those who are under trials and not convicted yet, to the jails of Jammu and Kashmir
- Introduced a private member's bill to enforce, implement and promote the complete prohibition of liquor and intoxicants in the Jammu & Kashmir.

== Resignation ==
On 3 November 2026, Aga Syed Ruhullah Mehdi announced his resignation from the Jammu and Kashmir National Conference (JKNC) and his decision to relinquish his membership of the Lok Sabha representing the Srinagar constituency. His decision followed prolonged disagreements with the party leadership, particularly over its position on the restoration of Article 370, statehood for Jammu and Kashmir, and the fulfilment of electoral promises. Mehdi criticised the party for what he described as a departure from its electoral commitments and stated that his decision was based on political principles rather than personal grievances. His resignation marked the end of his association with the National Conference after approximately 24 years.

Ref No: 1305/MP/SGR/2026 (Resignation letter).

== Influence of Ayatollah Ali Khamenei ==
Aga Syed Ruhullah Mehdi has publicly referred to the political thought and leadership of former Iranian Supreme Leader Ayatollah Ali Khamenei. In an address in October 2024, Mehdi highlighted Khamenei's emphasis on political wisdom while discussing the leadership of Hezbollah's former secretary-general Hassan Nasrallah. He quoted Khamenei in the context of the importance of political insight in leadership.

In March 2026, Mehdi also recalled having met Khamenei on two occasions, one when he was grieving the death of his father, Aga Syed Mehdi, and another during his tenure as a minister, according to ETV Bharat.
