= Astan Bandar =

Annual religious event in Wahabpora, Budgam, Jammu and Kashmir

Astan Bandar آستان بنڈار
- Also called: Baly-khani
- Observed by: Shia Muslims of Budgam District especially Wahabpora
- Type: Religious, Devotional
- Significance: Protection of crops by an Islamic manner
- Celebrations: Devotion for crops
- Observances: Procession, Recitation of the Quran, Marsiya, Fatiha and Dua

Astan Bandar is an annual religious local Majlis (marsiya khani) organised by the local villagers at the shrine of Aga Mir Syed Mohammad Baqir Mosavi in Wahabpora every year in the month of August or September. People gather from all walks of life to hold Majlis from different parts of the district. Marsiya is started followed by recitation of the Quran. It starts in the morning to the evening. At the end rice with meat is distributed among the people.

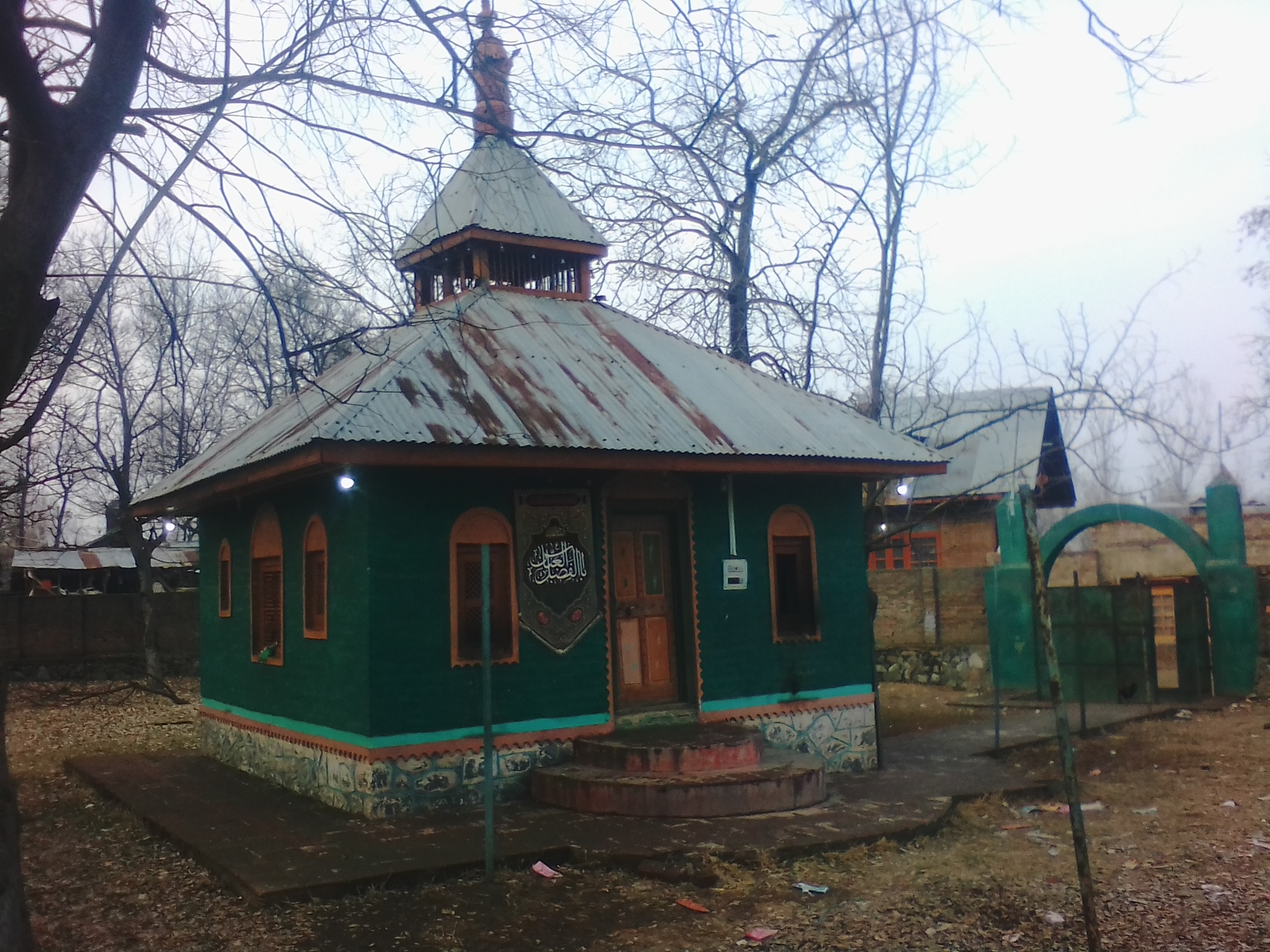
Astan Aaliyah of Aga Syed Baqir Kirmani where Astan Bandar takes place

== History ==
It is said that this Majlis started in 1500 A.D. It was started as the protection of crops in the village. The different crops of the villagers were destroyed because of many natural disasters, and it was kept as devotion (nazr) to protect all crops especially rice. Due to Unrest in Kashmir in 2008, 2010 and 2016 this Majlis was organised only for a short period of time. Some years ago the local farmers slaughtered Kashmiri cocks near their rice crop-fields. But this custom remains no longer.

== Etymology ==
The term Astan Bandar is composed of two-word Astan and Bandar. Astan means shrine and Bandar means devotion of food or any other thing. On this day the people devote food and meat at the shrine of Aga Mir Syed Mohammad Baqir Mosavi. So, it is called Astan Bandar or Devotion at the Shrine. Another name of Astan Bandar is Baly-khani. Due to lockdown and spread of COVID-19 pandemic Astan Bandar was postponed in the previous year. The management committee announced this announcement when the date of event was coming close. In 2021 Astan Bandar will be organised in the month of September after the month of Moharram-ul-Harram.

In this year the managing committee announced the date of Astan Bandar on 28 August 2022. On 27 August 2023, said committee made an announcement regarding Astan Bandar fixed on 3 September 2023. The next year it was fixed on 1 September 2024.

== Externals links ==
- Official Page of the Shrine of Aga Baqir
