= Ompora =

Place in Budgam district, Jammu and Kashmir, India

Ompora Wompur
- Town
- Location in Jammu and Kashmir, India Ompora (India)
- Coordinates: 34.0309°N 74.7386°E
- Union Territory: Jammu and Kashmir
- District: Budgam

Languages
  - Official: Kashmiri, Urdu, English
- Time zone: UTC+5:30 (IST)
- PIN: 191111

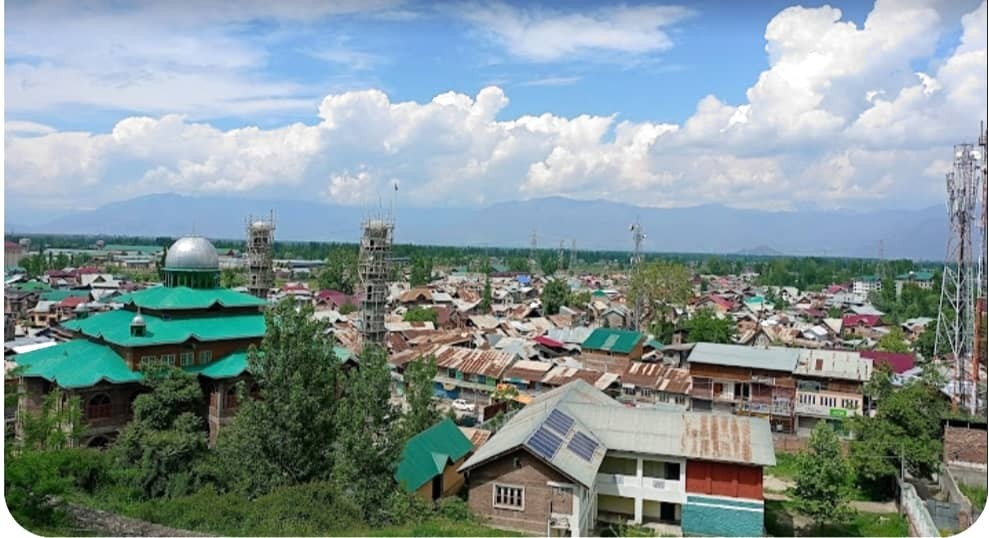
Beautiful View of ompora

Ompora (امپورہ), locally known as "Wompur", is a municipality area of district Budgam. It is about 9 km from the city centre, Lal Chowk. It is located on the Srinagar-Budgam road, roughly 3 km (1.9 mi) from Airport road. It is one of the densely and highly populated area of Budgam municipality in district Budgam.

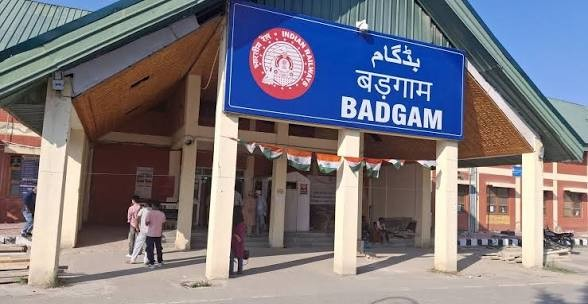
Budgam railway station ompora

The Budgam railway station is in the northeastern part of Ompora, nearly 2.5 km from district headquarters, Budgam.This railway station is largest in area railway station of kashmir. It holds offices that control the functioning of trains in valley. The govt housing colony in ompora is one of the oldest housing colony in valley and currently people from all over the valley are residing here including many higher govt officials.The Khulfai Rashideen Markazi jamia masjid in ompora is one of the largest Jamia Masjid in district budgam. The Ibn-e-sina private hospital is located in ompora. It is first private hospital in budgam district. It besides providing health facilities from renowned doctors of valley also provides nursing training and nursing aspirants from all over the valley are pursuing nursing training after getting admission. Ompora also holds govt health center that besides providing basic health facilities also holds office of block medical officer budgam

== See also ==
- Budgam
- Ichgam
- Kashmir
