= Aga Syed Muntazir Mehdi =

Indian politician and cleric from Jammu and Kashmir

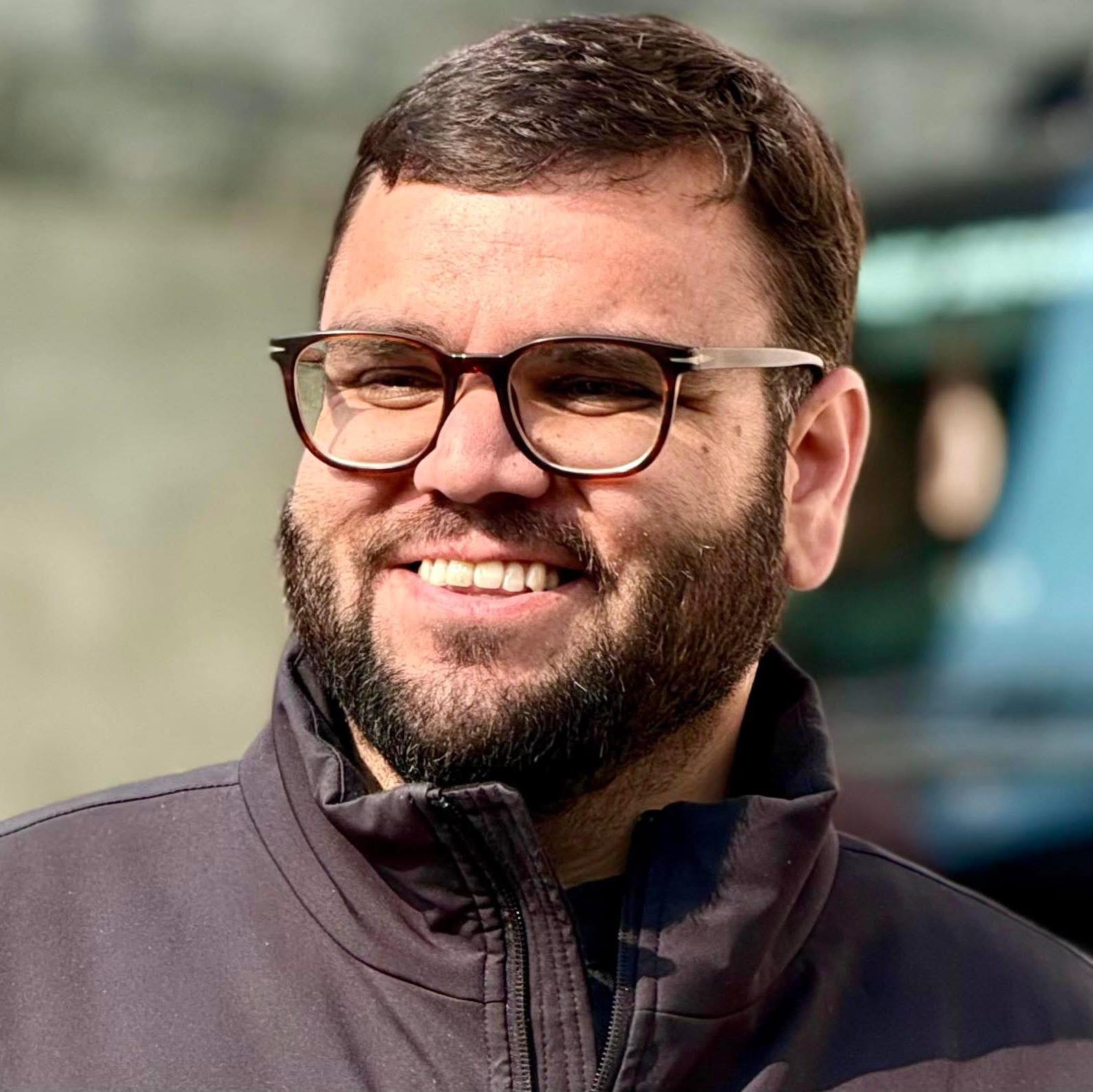

Member of the Jammu and Kashmir Legislative Assembly
- Incumbent
- Assumed office 14 November 2025
- Preceded by: Omar Abdullah
- Constituency: Budgam

Personal details
- Born: 1993 (age 32–33)
- Party: Jammu & Kashmir People's Democratic Party (PDP)
- Education: Bachelor of Law Constitutional Law
- Occupation: Politician, Advocate

Aga Syed Muntazir Mehdi (آغا سید منتظر مہدی) is an Indian politician of Jammu & Kashmir Peoples Democratic Party and a and member of the Jammu and Kashmir Legislative Assembly (MLA) from Budgam Assembly constituency He is part of the well-known Aga family of Budgam, a Kashmiri Shia religious and political family with major influence in central Kashmir.

== Early life and Family ==
Muntazir Mehdi belongs to the Aga family of Budgam, one of the well-known Shia clerical families in central Kashmir. His father, Aga Syed Hasan, is a senior Shia cleric and political figure in the region.

He is professionally a lawyer and has been described as a policy researcher.

== Political career ==
Muntazir Mehdi formally joined the Peoples Democratic Party (PDP) in August 2024 in the presence of senior party leadership.

During his induction, he stated that his aim was to raise the voices of youth and marginalized communities rather than pursue political power.

He contested the Budgam Assembly seat in the 2024 Jammu & Kashmir elections as the PDP candidate.

During the 2025 Budgam by-election campaign, he demanded fair enforcement of the Model Code of Conduct (MCC), alleging selective restrictions.

The district administration issued a show-cause notice to him for alleged MCC violations related to late-night campaigning.

He has also supported legislative issues, including praising a resolution about the restoration of Article 370 in the Jammu & Kashmir Assembly.

He successfully won from Budgam in the bypoll.

== Public image ==
Muntazir Mehdi is seen as a socio-religious figure in central Kashmir due to his family background and his engagement with political and community issues. His joining of PDP was reported as a boost for the party's influence in Budgam.

== Electoral record ==
Year	Election	Constituency	Party	Result
2024	Jammu & Kashmir Legislative Assembly	Budgam	PDP	Lost
2025	Budgam By-election	Budgam	PDP	Won
