= Aga Syed Mohammad Hadi =

Kashmiri Shia religious speaker

Aga Syed Mohammad Hadi Al-Moosavi Al-Safavi
- آغا سید محمد ہادی الموسوی الصفوی
- Title: Aga

Personal life
- Born: 1 December 1976 (age 49) Budgam
- Known for: Religious sermons, Shia community activities
- Website: https://agasyedhadi.com/

Religious life
- Religion: Islam
- Denomination: Usuli Twelver Shia
- Sect: Shia Islam (Twelver Shia)
- Jurisprudence: Ja'fari school

Muslim leader
- Present post: Anjuman Sharie Shiyan
- Post: Cleric; Shia Muslim Leader
- Predecessor: Aga Syed Mohammad Fazlullah
- Influenced by: Ayatollah Khomeini Ayatollah Ali Khamenei Ayatollah Sistani Allama Syed Jawad Naqvi

Aga Syed Hadi is a Kashmiri Shia religious speaker and community figure from Budgam, Jammu and Kashmir, India. He is the son of Aga Syed Mohammad Fazlullah and the grandson of Aga Syed Yusuf Al-Moosavi Al-Safavi. He is known for delivering religious sermons, participating in community gatherings, and engaging in youth and social initiatives within the region.
