= Unified District Information System for Education =

Indian school information database

The Unified District Information System for Education or UDISE is a database about schools in India. The database was developed at the Department of School Education, Ministry of Education, Government of India and Maintained by National Informatics Centre, Government of India.

It records information such as the level of dropouts and the condition of school toilets.
