= Aga Syed Mehdi =

Kashmiri muslim leader

Aga Syed Mehdi Mustafa
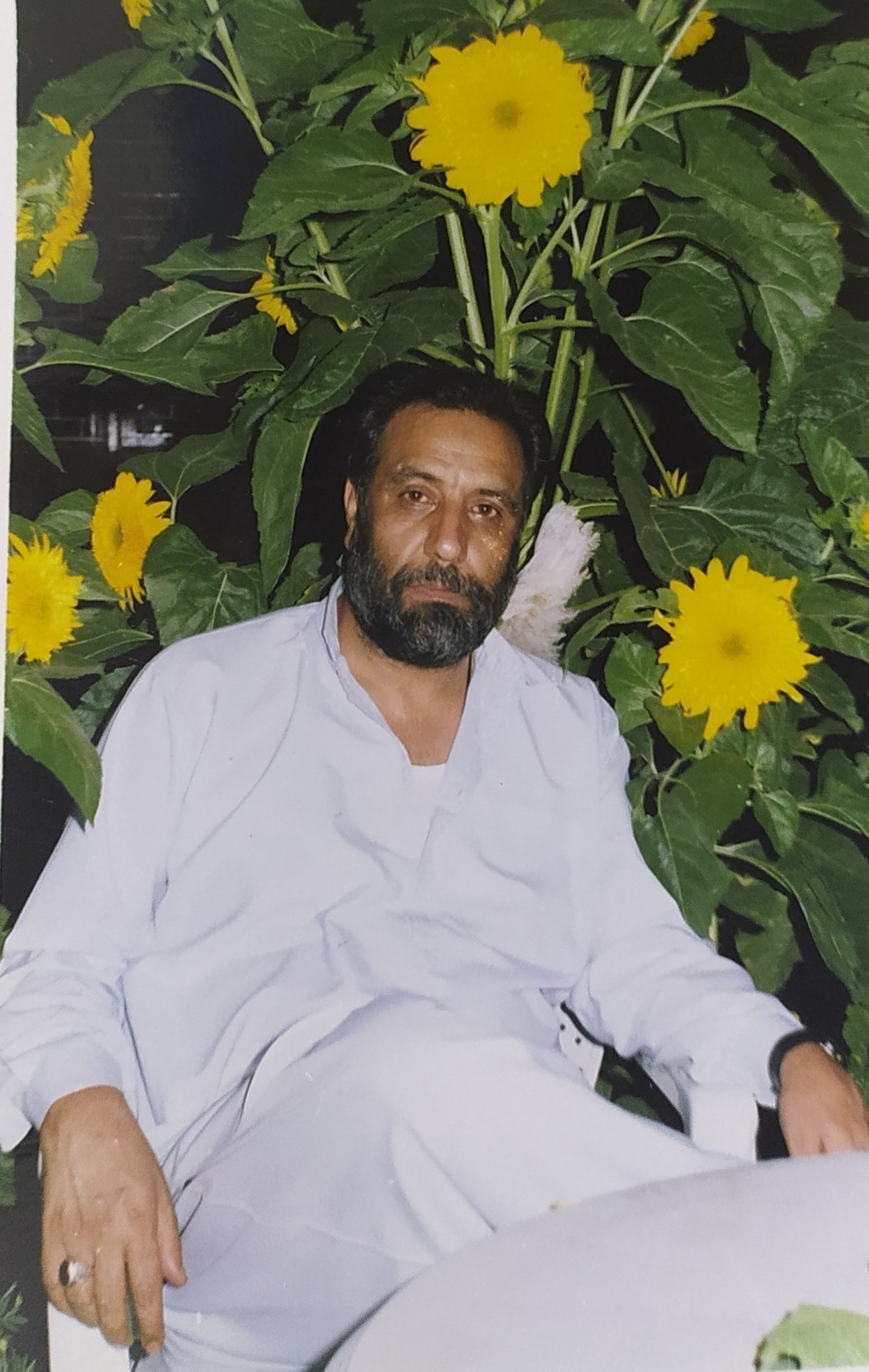
- Born: 19 February 1959
- Died: 3 November 2000 (aged 41); Kanihama-Magam Road
- Resting place: Ziyarat E Sarkaar, Budgam
- Title: Shaheed E Jafa
- Children: Aga Syed Ruhullah Mehdi
- Website: https://twitter.com/raheislam

Aga Syed Mehdi (19 February 1959 – 3 November 2000) was a prominent Shia cleric and politician from the Kashmir region. He belonged to the influential Aga family, known for their religious leadership within the Shia Muslim community. Aga Syed Mehdi played an important role in local politics and religious matters in Jammu and Kashmir, particularly advocating for the rights and interests of the Shia population. He was assassinated in an IED blast on Friday 3 November 2000.

== Life and education ==
Aga Syed Mehdi was born in Budgam, Kashmir into the prominent Aga family. He studied at Baab-ul-Ilm and subsequently received Maulawi Fazil from Jamia Bab-ul-Ilm, Budgam. He joined Anjuman E Sharie Shian as a member by the age of 22. He rose into prominence among the people for his philanthropic works. Later he joined Indian National Congress and participated in MP elections in 1998. During the time of 1990's Kashmir insurgency, Shaheed Aga Syed Mehdi rescued many innocent youth from interrogation centers and army camps detained during crackdowns by Task Force and military.

== Assassination and aftermath ==
On 3 November 2000, Aga Syed Mehdi was assassinated in a powerful IED blast on the way to Magam along with his three security personnel and two supporters at Kanihama-Magam road, Central Budgam. The blast was so powerful the bullet-proof gypsy was ripped apart and blew occupants into pieces. The news of his assassination spread rapidly, the government of Jammu and Kashmir imposed curfew and section 144 crpc still hundreds and thousands joined his funeral including mainstream and majority of separatist leaders . During his funeral Kashmiri pandit women of Budgam were heard crying "Bayo asi kus kari raech wain" meaning "Brother who will protect us now." Shaheed Aga Syed Mehdi was laid to rest at Sarkaar's Shrine Budgam or Aga Sahib Shrine.
