= Budgam railway station =

Railway station in Jammu and Kashmir, India

Budgam Railway Station

General information
- Other names: Badgam Railway Station
- Location: Budgam, Jammu and Kashmir
- Coordinates: 34.03866°N 74.73646°E
- System: Indian Railways station
- Line: Northern railway
- Platforms: 3
- Tracks: 14

Construction
- Structure type: Standard on-ground station
- Parking: Yes

Other information
- Status: Active
- Station code: BDGM
- Zone(s): Northern Railway
- Division(s): Jammu

History
- Opened: 2008
Location

Budgam Railway Station (also spelled Badgam) is a station on Northern Railway Network of Indian Railways. This station is the headquarter of Jammu–Baramulla line network. It is located in Ompora, a town in Budgam district nearly 2.5 km (1.6 mi) from main town Budgam.

== Location ==
The station is situated in Ompora town of Budgam district, Jammu and Kashmir just 9 km from Lal Chowk, the city centre and 2.5 km from district headquarters.

== History ==
The station was built as part of the Jammu–Baramulla line mega project, intending to link the Kashmir Valley with Jammu Tawi and the Indian rail network.

== Design ==
The station features Kashmiri wood architecture, with an intended ambiance of a royal court which is designed to complement the local surroundings to the station. Station signage is predominantly in Urdu, English and Hindi.

== Reduced level ==
The elevation of the station is 1588 m above mean sea level.

== See also ==
- Mazhom railway station
- Srinagar railway station
- Baramulla railway station
