= Persecution of Kashmiri Shias =

Genocide of Kashmiri Shias over 16th to 18th century

History of Shi'ism in Kashmir is marked with conflict and strife, spanning over half a millennium. Incidents of sectarian violence occurred in Kashmir under the rule of Mirza Haider Dughlat, followed by the Mughals (1586–1752), the Afghans (1752–1819), the Sikhs (1819–1845), and the Dogras (1846–1947). A small Shia community has managed to survive in Kashmir till today.

== Background ==
Tomb of Mir Shams-ud-Din Araqi

In 1381 CE, after Timur invaded Iran, Mir Syed Ali Hamdani, an Iranian Sufi arrived in Kashmir with a large number of disciples and preached Islam.

According to the 1873 British gazetteer of Kashmir:

The Sunnis far outnumber the Shias, . . . of the latter there were said to be only a thousand houses, numbering about five or six thousand souls, . . . found chiefly at Zadibal, about two koss to the north of Srinagar, at Nandapor and Hassanabad, near to the city lake. Though so few in number, the men of this sect form the most active, industrious, and well-to-do portion of the Mohamedan community. The finest papier-mache workers and shawl makers in Srinagar are Shias, and some of the wealthiest men in the city belong to that sect.

== The Incidents ==
=== The first cycle ===
In 1532 CE, Sultan Said Khan dispatched an army under the command of Mirza Haider Dughlat that attacked Baltistan and Ladakh from Kashgar. He suffered a military defeat and after death of Said Khan, joined the Mughal King Humayun in Agra. He returned to Kashmir 1540 CE, accompanied by 400 Mughal troops, at the invitation of one of the two rival factions that continually fought for power in Kashmir. He put an end to the Chak rule. His reign was a reign of terror and Shias had no choice but to practice Taqiyya. He asked opinion of Sunni scholars on a book, fiqh-i-Ahwat by Syed Muhammad Noorbakhsh, which was declared heresy. Mirza Dughlat writes:

Many of the people of Kashmir who were strongly attached to this apostasy, I brought back, whether they would or no, to the true faith, and many I slew. A number took refuge in Sufism but they are not true Sufis, having nothing but the name.

Mirza's policy of religious discrimination accelerated his decline. This sparked an all-out uprising and Dughlat was assassinated by the end of the same year and the Chak rule was restored.

=== The second cycle ===
In 1554, a Shia soldier Yusuf Mandav had a fight with a Sunni cleric Qazi Habibullah Khawarizmi after religious arguments. Qazi received serious injuries. However, the Qazi survived and Yusuf had hastily been stoned to death by a Sunni judge for attempting to kill him. The Shias demanded that justice be observed and the man who issued the decree for Yusuf's stoning-to-death be punished. Mirza Muqim, Akbar's envoy, killed Qazi Musa and Mulla Yusuf, resulting in tensions between the two communities.

One violent sectarian clash came in 1568, which resulted in tensions between Kashmir's ruler and Akbar. In 1585 CE, the ruler Yaqub Shah Chak demanded that Sunnis raise Shia slogans, which created divide. This provided Mughal Empire a perfect opportunity to attack Kashmir. Raja Bhagwan Das annexed Kashmir into Mughal Empire. The Chak rule came to an end and finally in 1589, the Mughal king Akbar extended his rule to Kashmir.

=== The third cycle ===
By the end of sixteenth century, famous Sunni saint Ahmad Sirhindi (1564 - 1624) had penned down a treatise under the title "Radd-e-Rawafiz" to justify the slaughter of Shias by Abdullah Khan Uzbek in Mashhad. In this he argues:

Since the Shia permit cursing Abu Bakr, Umar, Uthman and one of the chaste wives (of the Prophet), which in itself constitutes infidelity, it is incumbent upon the Muslim ruler, nay upon all people, in compliance with the command of the Omniscient King (Allah), to kill them and to oppress them in order to elevate the true religion. It is permissible to destroy their buildings and to seize their property and belongings.

Itqad Khan, who held the post of governor for eleven years, was a ruthless tyrant. He treated the Shias with utmost brutality. The Naqshbandi saints Khawaja Khawand Mahmud and disciples of Ahmad Sirhindi disliked Shias. During Zafar Khan's first rule, in 1636 CE, while people were picking fruits, an argument started between a Shia and a Sunni and it escalated to an all-out attack on the Shia neighborhoods.

=== The fourth cycle ===
In 1684 CE, the fourth Taraaj started with a financial matter between a Shia businessman Abdul Shakoor and a Sunni named Sadiq. Abdul Shakoor was alleged to have insulted the Companions of the Prophet and a local cleric issued a fatwa against him. Sunni mob attacked the Shia neighborhood of Hasan Abad for collective punishment. The governor Ibrahim Khan offered him security and tried to control the situation, but the Sunni clerics managed to bring in militias of Sunni Pashtun tribesmen from Kabul. They forced the governor to hand over the Shia businessman, his two sons and a son-in-law to the mob for lynching. A Sunni cleric, Mulla Muhammad Tahir Mufti tried to stop the mob, but his house was set on fire too. Another Shia notable, Baba Qasim, was caught by the invading militias, humiliated and tortured to death. Governor Ibrahim Khan's mansion was too set on fire. The state tried to control the riots and some of the perpetrators were punished by death. Emperor Aurangzeb removed Ibrahim Khan from governorship and released the Sunni perpetrators. This incident is described as the worst intra-Muslim sectarian clash during Aurangzeb's rule.

=== The fifth cycle ===
In 1719 CE, Emperor Muhammad Shah claimed the throne of Delhi. A cleric Mulla Abd-un-Nabi, also known as Mahtavi Khan, had been awarded a special status of Shaikh-ul-Islam by the Emperor. Muhammad Shah changed his policy and deprived the Mulla of special lordship and took back his jagir. He decided to create disorder by organizing a campaign of hate against Hindus and Shias. This affair led to riots, the fanatics among the Sunnis started to attack properties of Hindus and Shias, and police used force to protect them. Meanwhile Mulla Abd-un-Nabi got killed and rumors spread that a Shia official had conspired his assassination. The supporters of Mulla, led by his son Sharaf-ud-Din, attacked the Shia neighborhood of Zadibal. The lawlessness prevailed for two years until a large Mughal force entered Kashmir from Lahore in 1722 under Abdul Samad Khan and the rebel leader Sharaf-ud-Din was killed. Norman Hollister writes:

Muslims went again to the Charbeli quarter to exact retaliation for blood. This quarter was inhabited by Shias. There they began to bind, to kill and to burn. For two days, the fight was kept up, but the assailants then prevailed. Two or three thousand people, who were in that quarter, including a large number of Mughal travelers, were killed with their wives and families. Property to the value of lacs was plundered and the war raged for two or three days

This taraaj coincided with a power struggle among Delhi elites. Imad-ul-Mulk got some Sunni theologians on his side to declare a holy war against Safdar Jang, a Shia by faith. The propaganda called upon Sunnis to take up arms to defend the first three Caliphs. This hate mongering resulted in several bloody massacres of Shias in Kashmir and Punjab.

=== The sixth cycle ===
In 1741 - 1745 CE, there was a rebellion against the Mughal governor Inayat Ullah. Following Nadir Shah's invasion of Delhi, the deputy Abu Barkat Khan rebelled against his master and declared himself independent king, murdering Inayat Ullah in 1741. Mughal Emperor appointed Asad Yar Khan as governor of Kashmir. This resulted in a revolt led by Dir Ullah Beg, together with some Shia soldiers. As a revenge, Abu Barkat Khan inflicted atrocities towards the Shia civilians of Srinagar.

=== The seventh cycle ===
In 1762 - 1764 CE, the Afghan ruler of Kashmir Buland Khan Bamzai persecuted the Shias. Under the subedari of Amir Khan Jawan Sher, who supported Shias, once the rumor spread that some Shias have passed negative remarks about a Sufi saint Khawaja Habibullah Nowshehri. Furious Sunni mob attacked Zadibal neighborhood and torched the houses belonging to the Shias. Buland Khan ordered arrests of the Shias accused of blasphemy. In 1765, a Shia cleric Hafiz Abdullah was punished by beheading for preaching Shia faith. In 1788, when the then governor Juma Khan Alokzai went to Kabul to help prince Timur, sectarian riot broke out.

=== The eighth cycle ===
In 1803 CE, violent clashes broke out between Shias and Sunnis. The British gazetteer notes:

In the times of the Pathans, the Shias were not allowed to enact the feast of Moharem. In the time of Abdullah Khan, who made himself independent of his master at Kabul, they attempted to celebrate, but were attacked and plundered, and their houses burnt; some 150 of them (for there were very few in the city) were collected, their noses pierced, and one string passed through them all, and thus linked together, they were made to perambulate the bazars

=== The ninth cycle ===
Kashmir was conquered by Sikhs in 1819. This was the time when Syed Ahmad Barelvi, who later became famous for his war against Sikh Empire, was visiting towns of North Indian planes with hundreds of missionaries to preach against Shia beliefs and practices. Syed Ahmad repeatedly destroyed tazias, an act that resulted in subsequent riots and chaos. Since the reign of Emperor Aurangzeb, the Shias were supposed to provide the new carpets every year for Jamia Masjid, Srinagar. A violent clash occurred during the governorship of Bhima Singh Ardali. In 1831 CE, the Shia suburb of Zadibal was set on fire. The British gazetteer notes:

In the time of the governor Bama Singh, the Shias attempted to celebrate the Moharem, but the enraged Sunnis fell upon them, killed fifteen of them, and plundered their property; and the Persian merchants, of whom there were two or three hundred, retreated from Kashmir and have never since resided there

Following the disturbances in the city, it is again in the genre of Kashmiri Marsiya that the Shiʿi feeling of helplessness gets registered:

O Master! you are our guardian

fortify our souls,

for our wings are clipped, flights aborted. .....

Secure us under your wings,

we are devoted to you, do not abandon us O you with a phoenix wing.

We are caught in the talons of a tyrant, like an innocent dove in a hawk's, there's no refuge for us except you, redeem us, O Master!

In May 1831, Syed Ahmad Barelvi was killed in Balakot while trying to enter Kashmir.

=== The tenth cycle ===
In 1872 CE, brutal attacks were orchestrated against Shias during the reign of Dogra Raja Ranbir Singh. The bitter violence centered around a dispute over a shrine but on the background the economic conflict between Shias and Sunnis can not be ignored. The shawl market was dominated by the high quality fabrics produced by Shia weavers of Zadibal. The British gazetteer narrates the riots as follows:

The disturbances then raged for more than a week, and for some time defied the efforts of the governor, who called in the aid of troops; whole districts were reduced to smoldering heaps of ruins; and business was for some time entirely suspended, a great portion of the city being deserted. The Shias fled in every direction, some seeking safety on the adjacent mountains, while others remained in the city in secret lurking places. Many of the women and children of the Shias found an asylum from the hands of their infuriated co-religionists in the houses of the Hindu portion of the community. When order was at length restored, the ringleaders of the riot were seized and imprisoned, besides hundreds or thousands, it is said, of the poorer inhabitants

== Modern times ==
The 1979 Islamic Revolution of Iran was the turning point of the Shi'ism in Kashmir. Kashmiri Shias took the inspiration from it, their clergy went to Iran and established connection with the Iranian clergy. In the subsequent years, Kashmiri Shia institutions started sending their students to Iran and it led to the political as well as religious awareness of Kashmiri Shias. They see in the victory of the Shias in Lebanon, Iraq, Iran, Yemen their own triumph.

In recent years, the literacy rate among Shia Muslims in Kashmir has witnessed a significant increase. Members of this community have made noteworthy contributions to both Kashmir and the broader global context. Additionally, a growing number of authors, scholars, historians, and poets have emerged from this group, reflecting their active participation in intellectual and cultural spheres.

Major mourning processions have been banned by the Government of Jammu and Kashmir since the 1990s when there was a rise in insurgency in the state. However, one of the biggest mourning procession, which passes through Lal Chowk, Srinagar, has been permitted again since 2023, after a ban of over 3 decades.

Smaller processions are permitted in some areas of the state, including in the districts of Bandipora, Srinagar, Budgam, Parts of Ganderbal, Baramulla, Leh and Kargil.

In the post 9/11 scenario, sectarian terrorism has resurfaced in Kashmir. Here are some of the recent incidents of brutality:-

- November 3, 2000: Assassination of Shia religious leader Agha Syed Mehdi in Budgam.
- A prominent Kashmiri Shia religious leader from Srinagar, Iftikhar Ansari was thrice the target of unsuccessful assassination attempts. In June 2000, Ansari barely escaped the explosion of a landmine while addressing a religious congregation at Gund Khwaja Qasim Pattan. The blast killed twelve of his followers. On 1 September 2000, Ansari was injured by an IED explosion that killed two police personnel i
- December 27, 2009: Suicide bombing on Shia gathering in Muzaffarabad in Pakistan administered Kashmir leaves 10 dead, 65 injured.
- February 15, 2017: Assassination attempt on Shia cleric and his wife in Muzaffarabad in Pakistan administered Kashmir.
- The 2020 Muharram crackdown, where pellets and bullets were used against peaceful Shia mourners

== See also ==
- Shia Islam
- Shia Islam in the Indian subcontinent
- Tomb of Shams-ud-Din Araqi
- Kashmir
- Anti-Shi'ism
- Persecution of Hazaras
- Persecution of Shias by the Islamic State
- Tafazzul Husain Kashmiri
