= Budgam =

- Town
- Location in Jammu and Kashmir, India Budgam (India) Budgam (Asia)
- Coordinates: 34.015°N 74.722°E
- Country: India
- Union territory: Jammu and Kashmir
- District: Budgam

Government
  - Type: Democratic
  - Body: Municipal Council

Area
  - Total: 10.08 km^{2} (3.89 sq mi)
- Elevation: 1,610 m (5,280 ft)

Population (2011)
  - Total: 15,338
  - Density: 1,522/km^{2} (3,941/sq mi)
- Demonym(s): Badgamin, Badgamia, Budgami

Languages
  - Official: Kashmiri, Urdu, Hindi, Dogri, English

Demographics
  - Literacy: 73.0%
  - Sex ratio: 703.7 ♀/ 1000 ♂
- Time zone: UTC+5:30 (IST)
- Postal code: 191111
- Vehicle registration: JK 04
- Website: budgam.nic.in

Budgam (Urdu pronunciation: [bəɖɡɑːm]), known as Badgom (Kashmiri pronunciation: [baɖɡoːm]; lit. 'big village') in Kashmiri, is a town in Budgam district in the union territory of Jammu and Kashmir, India in the disputed Kashmir region. In the 2001 census, it was recorded as having a notified area committee, but by the 2011 census it had a municipal committee.

== Demographics ==
As of 2011 India census, Budgam had a population of 15,338. There were 9,003 males (59%) and 6,335 females (41%). Of the population, 1,335 (8.7%) were age 0-6: 680 males (51%) and 655 females (49%). The literacy rate for the people over six was 73.0% (males 84.3%, females 56.4%).

About 25% of the Muslim population of Budgam district belong to Shia sect.

Religions in Budgam
Religion	Percent
Muslim	91%
Hindu	7.7%
Sikhs	1.7%
Others†	0.3%
Distribution of religions †Includes Buddhists (<0.2%).

Historical population
Year	Pop.	±% p.a.
1911	1,065	—
2001	11,767	+2.71%
2011	15,338	+2.69%

== Transport ==
=== Road ===
Budgam is connected with National Highway 444 to rest of India.

=== Railways ===
Budgam railway station is in Ompora, which is 2.5 km (1.6 mi) from Budgam. It is on the Jammu–Baramulla line.

== Municipal committee ==
Keys: INC (6) BJP (4) Vacant (3)

#	Name	Municipal Ward	Reservation Status	Party
1	Dilsahada Banoo	Ganie Mohalla	Women Open	INC
2	Mehraj Ud Din Dar	Khanpora	Open	INC
3	Vacant	Haknipora	Open	N/A
4	Razia Hassan	Wahadatpora	Women Open	INC
5	Mushtaq Ahmad Bhat	Bazar Mohalla	Open	INC
6	Hakim Rohullah Gazi	Karipora	Open	INC
7	Shahnaza Hussain	Narispora	Women Open	BJP
8	Samiullah Bhat	Housing Colony Ompora	Open	BJP
9	Gh. Rasool Bhat	Dobi Mohallah	Open	BJP
10	Vacant	Kaisie Mohalla	Women Open	N/A
11	Vacant	Parray Angan	Open	N/A
12	Hakim Rohulla Gazi	Kharpora	Open	INC
13	Nisar Ahmad Najar	Mohanpora	Open	BJP

== See also ==
- Ganderbal
- Srinagar
- Dooniwari
- Bagati Kani Pora
- Pulwama
- Ichigam
- Wahabpora
- Namtehal
