= Gondipora =

Village in Jammu and Kashmir

Gondipora Gondpor
- Village
- The Village Council Of Gundipur
- Country: India
- Union territory: Jammu and Kashmir
- District: Budgam
- Tehsil: Beerwah
- Founder: not known.

Government
  - Type: Panchayat
  - Body: Village council
- Demonym: گۄنٛدپورؠکؠ

Languages
  - Official: Kashmiri, Urdu, Hindi, English
  - Spoken Language: Kashmiri
- Time zone: UTC+5:30 (IST)
- PIN: 193411
- Vehicle registration: JK04

Gondipora or Gondpor is a village in tehsil Beerwah of district Budgam of the Jammu and Kashmir.

== Educational institutions ==
- Govt. HS School Gondipora.
- Govt. MS School Gondipora.
- Salfia Secondary Institute Gondipora.

== See also ==
- Rathsoon.
- Aripanthan.
- Beerwah, Jammu and Kashmir.
- Ohangam.
- Sonapah.
- Wanihama.
- Meerpora.
- Kandour.
- Arizal, Jammu and Kashmir.
