= Chewdara =

Village in Jammu and Kashmir, India

Chewdara Tsivdor Chivdora
- Village
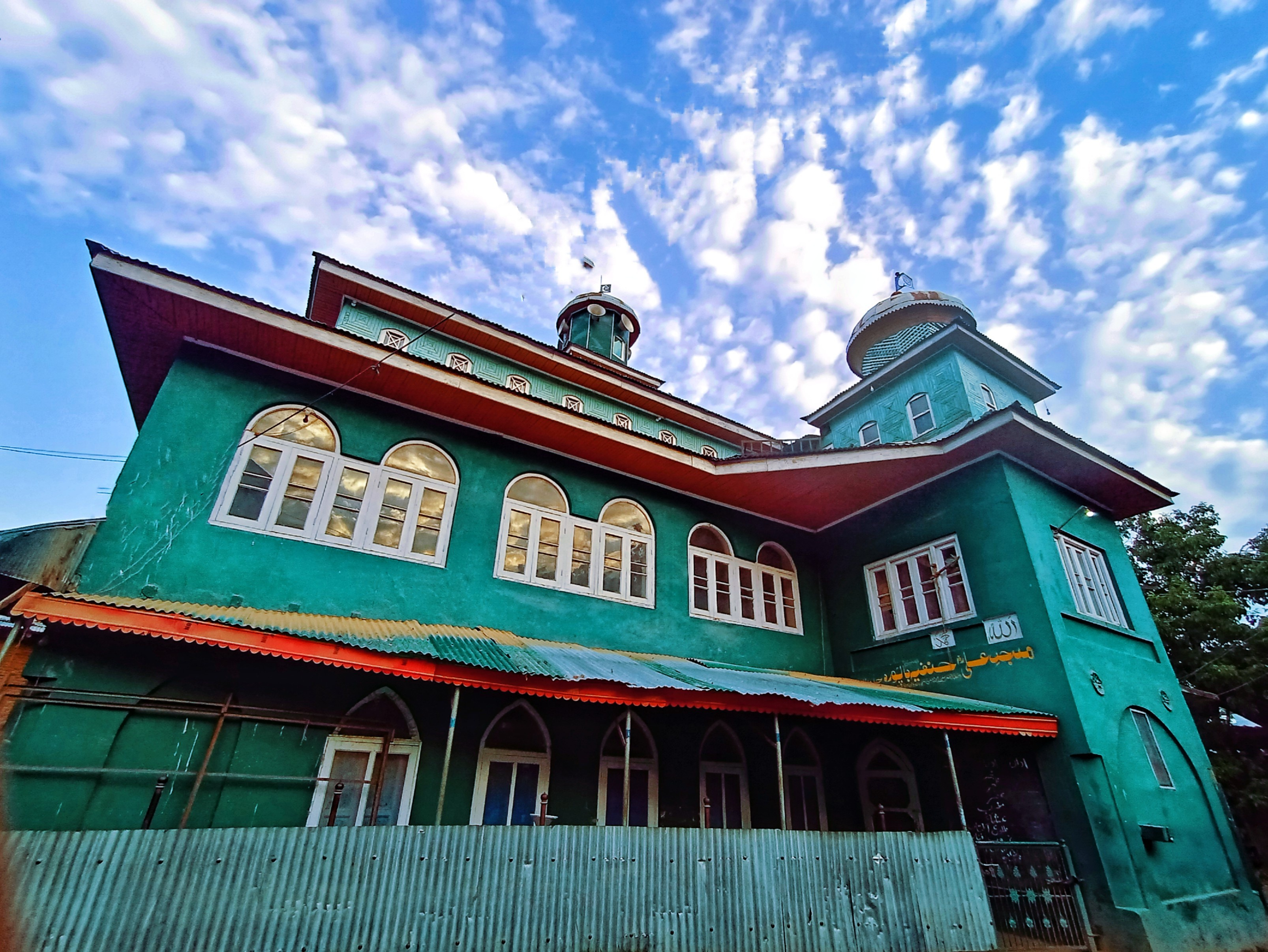
- Markazi Jamia Masjid Shareef In Chewdara — Masjid-i-Ali (r.a) (مرکٔزی جامعه مسجد شریٖف ژیوٚڈور)

- Location in Jammu and Kashmir, India Chewdara (India)
- Country: India
- Union territory: Jammu and Kashmir
- District: Budgam
- Tehsil: Beerwah
- Block/DDC Constituency: Rathsoon

Government
  - Type: Panchayat
  - Body: Government of India
  - DDC Councilor: Khursheed Ahmed Sheikh
  - Sarpanch: Mohammed Maqbool Dar(Chewdara-A), [present]; Bilal Ahmad Mir (Chewdara-B),[present]
- Elevation: 1,580 m (5,180 ft)

Population (2011)
  - Total: 4,161

Languages
  - Official: Kashmiri, Urdu, English
- Time zone: UTC+5:30 (IST)
- PIN: 193411
- Religion: Islam
- Sex Ratio: 1897 ♀/ 2264 ♂
- Ethnicity: Kashmiris
- Website: https://redel9.github.io/Chewdara/

Chewdara, Tsivdor or Chivdora,(/tʃudærə/) is a village in the Rathsun block of the Beerwah tehsil in Budgam district of Jammu and Kashmir, India. It is located 21 km (13 mi) towards west of the Budgam district headquarters, 3 km (1.9 mi) from Beerwah and 23 km (14 mi) from the winter capital Srinagar. Chewdara has two panchayats, Chewdara-A and Chewdara-B.

== Demographics ==
=== Population ===
As of the 2011 census, the population of Chewdara is 4161, of which 2264 are males and 1897 are females. The total number of children below 6 years is 824 as per the report. There are about 626 houses in Chewdara.

Population%
Population	percentage%
Males	54.41%
Females	45.59%

=== Religion ===
Religions
Religion	percentage%
Islam	100%
Others	0%

== Geography ==
The total geographical area of Chewdara village is 249.7 Hectares (2.497 km^{2}). It is located at an elevation of 1,580 m (5,180 ft.) above the sea level.

== Educational institutions ==
=== Schools ===
The major institutions in Chewdara are the Government Higher Secondary School and the Al-Huda International School and Govt Boys Primary school and Govt middle school Umerabad.

=== Orphanages ===
Apna Ghar, an orphanage located in Chewdara Beerwah.

== Transport ==
The nearest railway station to Chewdara is the Mazhom railway station, and the nearest airport is the Sheikh ul-Alam International Airport. And nearest town chewdara is Magam and Beerwah .

== Mosques ==
There are two mosques in the village that hold congregational Friday prayers.

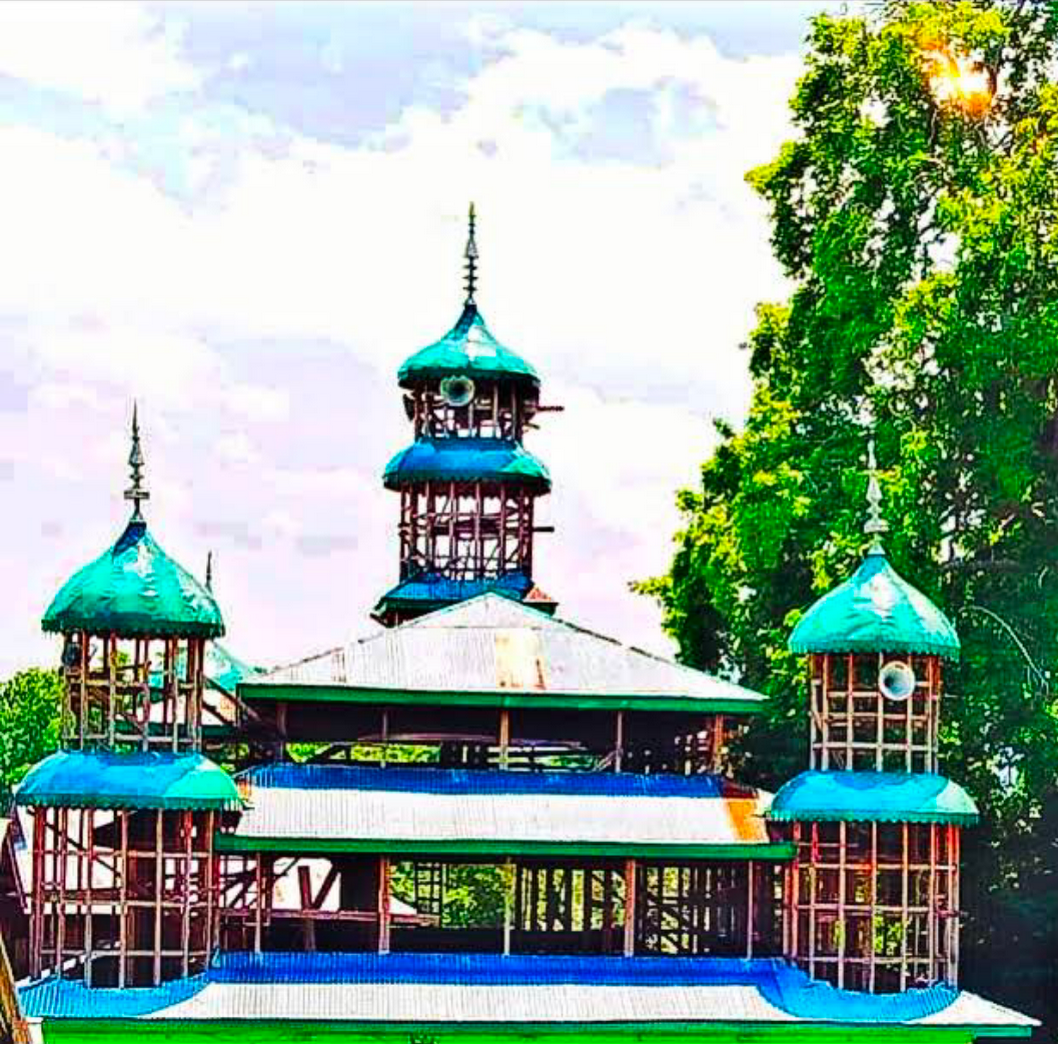
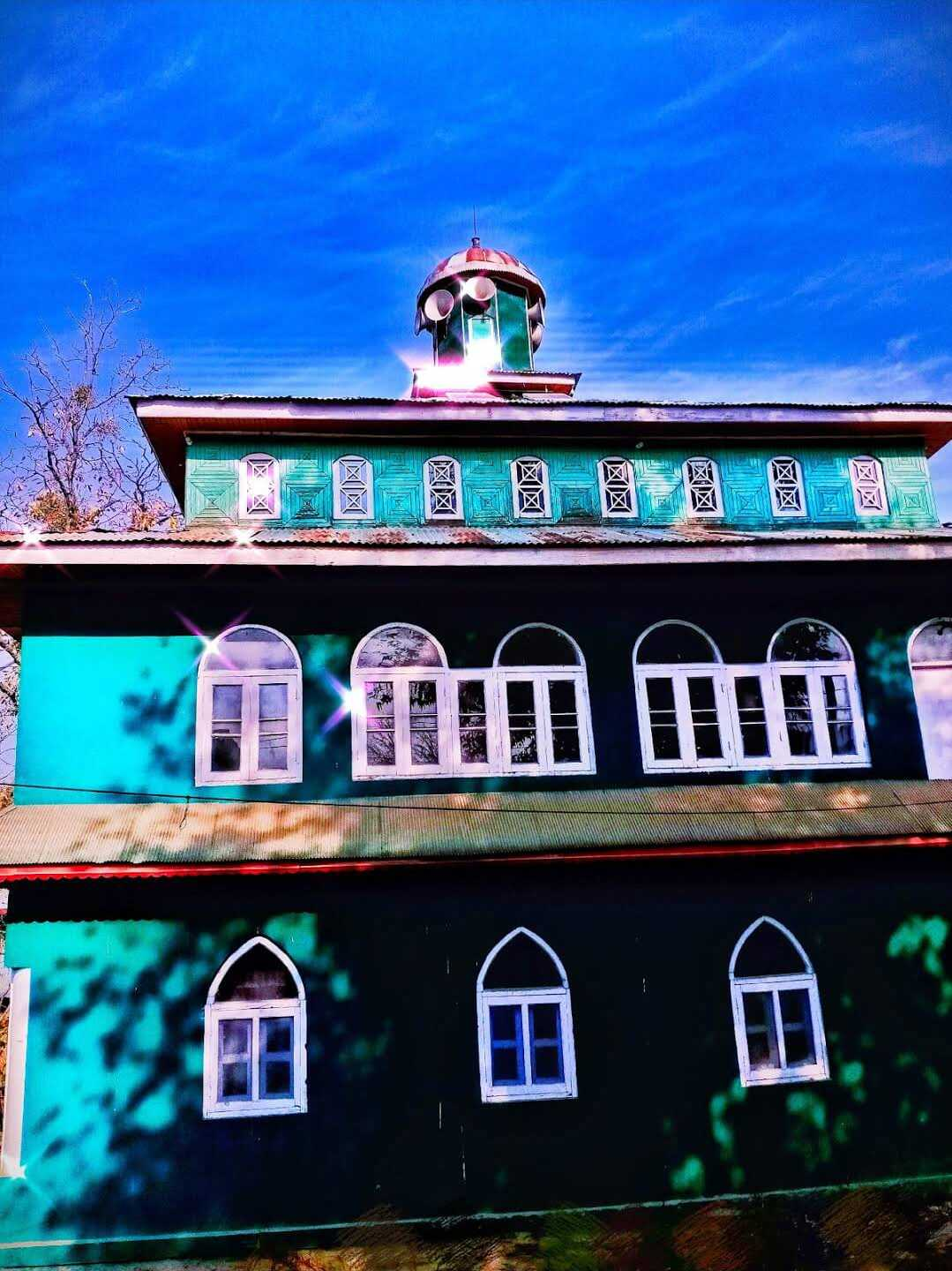

== Shrines ==
Shrines of Sufis/Auliya'as in Chewdara. Their names are as follows:

- Hazrat Baba Naseeb-Ud-Din Ghazi (Chewdara-A).
- Syed Ali Allauddin Khansahib Razvi-Al Bukhari, (Chewdara-B)
- Syed Ali's father "Syed Saif Ud Din (khansahib) Bukhari (R.A)" (Chewdara-B).
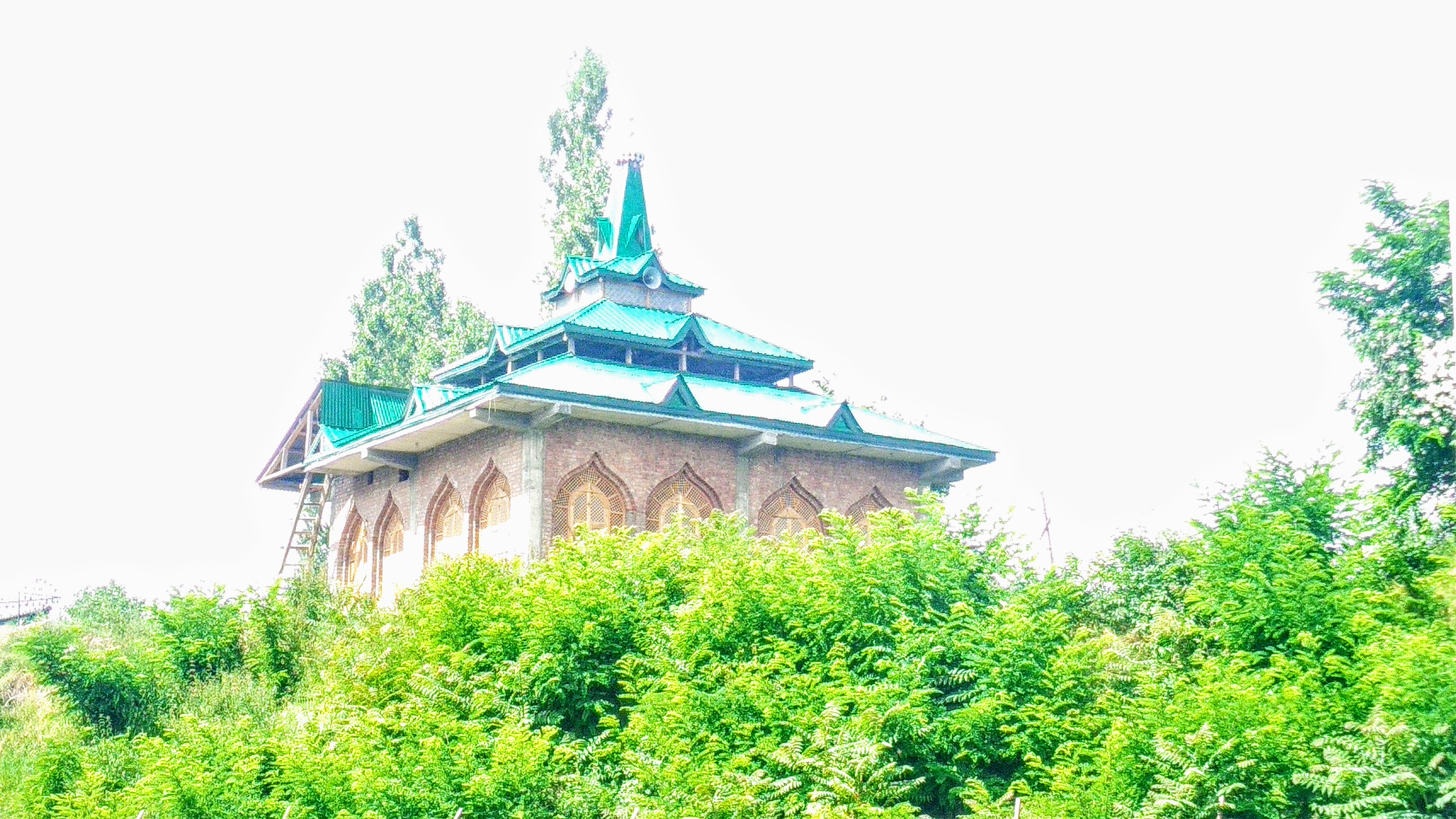
  shrine of syed ali alaa ud din khansahib bukhari

== Notable people ==
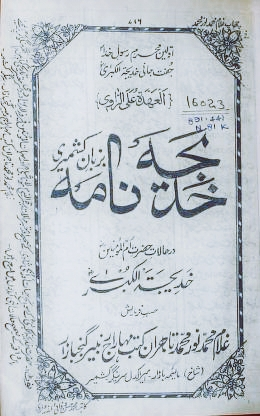
Khadeejah Namah

- Pir Ali Shah Kashmiri (poet): Author whose works include Khadeej/Khatij/Khadijah Namah about Khadija bint Khuwaylid, the first wife of Muhammad.

== See also ==
- Rathsoon.
- Aripanthan.
- Pethmakhama.
- Beerwah.
- Ohangam.
- Sonapah.
- Wanihama.
- Meerpora.
- Kandour.
- Arizal .
