= Manchama =

Village in Jammu and Kashmir

Manchama Manchoam
- Village
- Country: India
- Union territory: Jammu and Kashmir
- District: Budgam
- Tehsil: Beerwah
- Founder: not known.

Government
  - Type: Panchayat

Languages
  - Official: Kashmiri, Urdu, Hindi, Dogri, English
- Time zone: UTC+5:30 (IST)
- PIN: 193411
- Vehicle registration: JK04

Manchama or Manchoam is a village in tehsil Beerwah of the district Budgam of the Jammu and Kashmir.

== See also ==
- Chewdara
- Rathsoon
- Ohangam
- Meerpora
