= Aarizal =

Village in Jammu and Kashmir, India

Arizal Ạ̄rụzāl
- Village
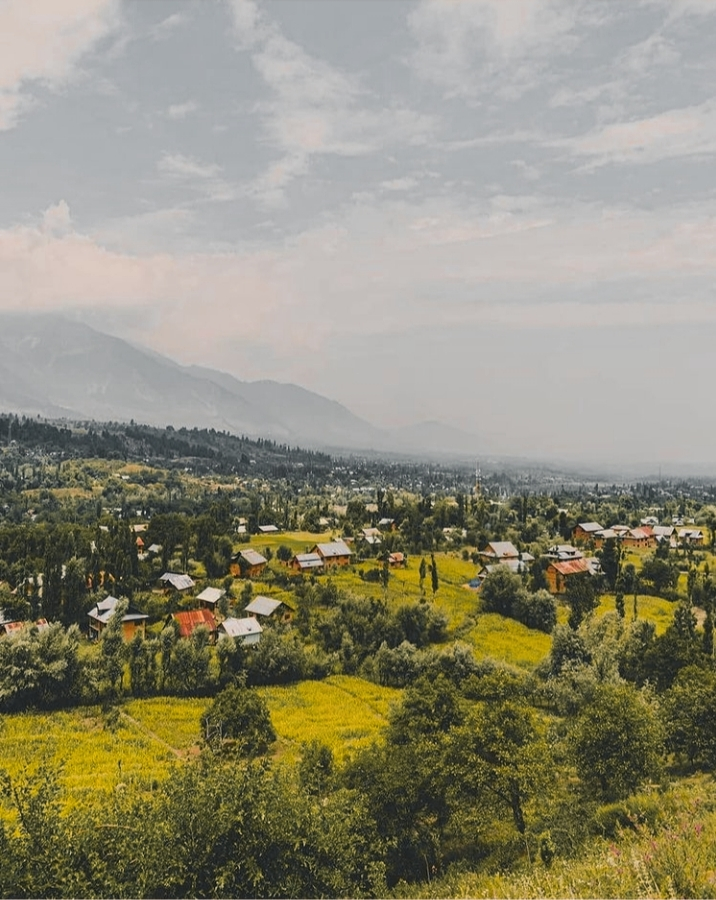

- Location in Jammu and Kashmir, India Arizal (India)
- Coordinates: 33.922°N 74.595°E
- Country: India
- Union territory: Jammu and Kashmir
- District: Budgam
- Tehsil: Khansahib
- Block: Sukhnag

Government
  - Type: Panchayat Samiti
  - Body: Gram Panchayat
  - Sarpanch: Mehmooda Bano

Area
  - Total: 133 ha (330 acres)
- Elevation: 1,668 m (5,472 ft)

Population (2011)
  - Total: 1,715
  - Density: 1,290/km^{2} (3,340/sq mi)

Languages
  - Official: Kashmiri, Urdu, Hindi, Punjabi, English
  - Spoken: Kashmiri

Literacy rate
  - Total: 49.92 %
  - Male: 63.62 %
  - Female: 34.69 %
- Time zone: UTC+5:30 (IST)
- PIN: 193411
- Vehicle registration: JK04
- Religion: Islam
- Sex Ratio: 841 ♀/ 874 ♂
- Ethnicity: Kashmiris

Arizal (Note: Kashmiri pronunciation: [əːrɨzaːl] ; Urdu pronunciation: [ɑːɾiːzɑːl]) is a village in Budgam district in Kashmir region of Indian Union Territory Jammu and Kashmir. It is situated at the base of the Pir Panjal Range of the Himalayas, in the Sukhnag Valley. It falls under the administrative division of tehsil Khansahib, (block Sukhnag) which is one of the nine tehsils of district Budgam. It lies at a distance of about 35 kilometres (22 mi) from the district headquarters Budgam, 16 kilometres (9.9 mi) from the sub-district headquarters Khansahib, and 45 kilometres (28 mi) away from Srinagar, the summer capital of Jammu and Kashmir.

According to the 2011 census, it had a population of 1,715.

== Etymology ==
The native name of the village in Kashmiri is Ạ̄rụzāl. The English form, Arizal, is borrowed from its Hindustani name, Ārīzāl.

The exact etymology of Ạ̄rụzāl remains unverified, though it is traditionally believed to be derived from Ārụzāl, meaning 'river-web'

== Demographics ==
=== Population ===
As of 2011 census, the population of Arizal is 1715 of which 874 (51%) are males while the remaining 841 (49%) are females and a total number of 467 children (217 boys and 250 girls) below 6 years as per the report. There are about 252 households in Arizal village.

Population (%)
Population
Males	51%
Females	49%
Distribution of Population (2011)

=== Religion ===
Religions
Religion
Islam	100%
Others	0%
Distribution of Population on Religion

Sects of Islam
Sects of Islam
Sunni	100%
Others	0%
Distribution of Sects on Religion

The village is entirely populated by Sunni Muslims.

=== Ethno-linguistic background ===
Population (%)
Population
Kashmiris	100%
Others	0%
Distribution of Population on Ethnicity

=== Literacy ===
According to the 2011 Census of India, Arizal has a lower literacy rate compared to the overall average of Jammu and Kashmir. The village recorded a literacy rate of 49.92%, whereas the state average stood at 67.16%.

A significant gender disparity exists within the local literacy data; male literacy in Arizal was recorded at 63.62%, while the female literacy rate stood at 34.69%.

Literacy Demographics (%)
Category
Overall Literacy rate	49.92%
Male Literacy	63.62%
Female Literacy	34.69%
Literacy rate (2011 Census)

== See also ==
- Rathsoon
- Aripanthan
- Beerwah, Jammu and Kashmir
- Ohangam
- Sonapah
- Wanihama
- Meerpora
- Kandour
- Chewdara
