= Meerpora =

Village In Jammu and Kashmir

Meerpora/Miripora. Mir pur
- Village
- The Village Council Of Mir Pur
- Nickname: Mirpur
- Country: India
- Union territory: Jammu and Kashmir
- District: Budgam
- Tehsil: Beerwah

Government
  - Type: Panchayat
  - Body: Village council

Population (2011)
  - Total: 1,998
- Demonym: Mirpure

Languages
  - Official: Kashmiri, Urdu, Hindi, Dogri, English
  - Local Language: Kashmiri
- Time zone: UTC+5:30 (IST)
- PIN: 193411
- Vehicle registration: JK04
- Sex Ratio: 954 ♀/ 1044 ♂

Meerpora, Miri Pora or Mir Pur is a village in tehsil Beerwah, district Budgam of the Jammu and Kashmir (India).

== Transport ==
Meeripora is connected to nearby towns through an all-weather road network. The village is accessible by road from Beerwah, Magam, Budgam, and Srinagar. Public transport is available in the form of buses, minibuses, shared taxis, and private vehicles, providing regular connectivity to Beerwah and Magam. The nearest railway station is Mazhama railway station, while the nearest airport is Srinagar International Airport, approximately 30 km away.

== About ==
- Mirpur is a village in Beerwah Tehsil of Budgam district, in the Union Territory of Jammu and Kashmir, India. Situated in the central Kashmir Valley, the village is known for its scenic surroundings, agricultural landscape, and close-knit community. Agriculture and horticulture are the primary occupations, with paddy, maize, and apple cultivation contributing to the local economy. Kashmiri is the most widely spoken language, while Urdu, Hindi, and English are also used. The village is connected by road to Beerwah and nearby towns, providing access to schools, healthcare facilities, markets, and other essential public services. It reflects the rich cultural and rural heritage of Kashmir.

Education and facilities

- Government primary and middle schools in and around the village
- Health Sub-Centre within the village
- Primary Health Centre within a few kilometres
- Public bus services connecting Meeripora with Beerwah Magam and Srinagar

== Educational institutions ==
- Govt. HS School meeripora
- Govt. Primary School meeripora.
- hanief ud din meeripora.

== See also ==
- Rathsoon.
- Aripanthan.
- Beerwah, Jammu and Kashmir.
- Ohangam.
- Sonapah.
- Wanihama.
- gondipora
- Kandour.
- Arizal, Jammu and Kashmir.
