= Badran, Jammu and Kashmir =

Badran
- Village
- Location in Jammu and Kashmir, India Badran (India)
- Coordinates: 34°05′N 74°35′E
- Country: India
- Union Territory: Jammu and Kashmir
- District: Budgam

Population (2011)
  - Total: 4,036

Languages
  - Official: Kashmiri, Urdu, Hindi, Dogri, English
- Time zone: UTC+5:30 (IST)
- Pin Code: 193401
- Area codes: 01951, +91
- Vehicle registration: JK 04

Badran is a village located in district Budgam ,3 km away from Magam Town and is situated on right side on Magam -Beerwah Road in the Indian administered union territory of Jammu and Kashmir.

== Geography ==
Badran is a large village located in tehsil Magam in district Budgam in Jammu and Kashmir, India. It is 25 km (16 mi) away from Srinagar, the summer capital of the Jammu and Kashmir. Some of the nearby villages are Adina, Goigam, Kanihama (famous for Kani Shawl), Tarhama, Pethmakhama, Aripanthan etc.

== Demography ==
According to 2011 census of India, the population of village Badran is 4,036. However the population of children with age 0-6 is 814 which makes up 20.17% of total population of village. Average Sex Ratio of Badran village is 927 which is higher than Jammu and Kashmir state average of 889. Child Sex Ratio for the Badran as per census is 902, higher than Jammu and Kashmir average of 862.

== Education ==
According to census of 2011, literacy rate of Badran village was 60.83% compared to 67.16% of Jammu and Kashmir. In Badran male literacy stands at 68.01% while female literacy rate was 53.15%.

=== Educational institutions ===
A Government High School and a Government Middle School are there in the village in addition to some other primary educational institutions. For further education the students generally go to the nearby Higher Secondary Schools and Degree Colleges. The nearest intermediate and higher education institutions are situated just 3 km (1.9 mi) away from the village in Magam town.

== Transport ==
Badran is connected by a kilometer long link road with Magam-Beerwah main road.

Mazhom railway station is located 5 km (3.1 mi) from Badran. Railway station can be reached by public transportation like auto rickshaw, taxi, buses etc. via Badran Link road or via Banderwani to Magam-Beerwah main road.

Now the new transport has been in process for Magam to Badran like auto etc.

== Healthcare ==
The village has a Govt. Primary Health Centre but for the treatment of major ailments, the residents generally need to go to the nearby towns or to the summer capital of the state. A full-fledged government hospital is under construction.

== Cultural groups ==
The village is also known for its cultural groups. New Kashmir Construction Youth Club and Gulshan Cultural Forum Kashmir were founded by Abdul Aziz Betab and Gulshan Badrani, respectively. Many literary figures are also associated with these groups.
