= Talim =

Talim (Arabic: تعليم, taʿlīm) in Islam refers to the process of teaching, instruction, and imparting religious or general knowledge. The word is derived from the Arabic root ʿilm (علم, ʿilm), meaning “knowledge,” and is closely associated with the transmission and acquisition of knowledge, especially Islamic teachings.

Talim may also refer to:

- Indian classical music instruction
- Typhoon Talim
- Talim Island
- Talim (Soulcalibur series)
- Talim (textiles)
- List of storms named Talim
