= Aasar-i-Shareef Pethmakhama =

Shrine in India

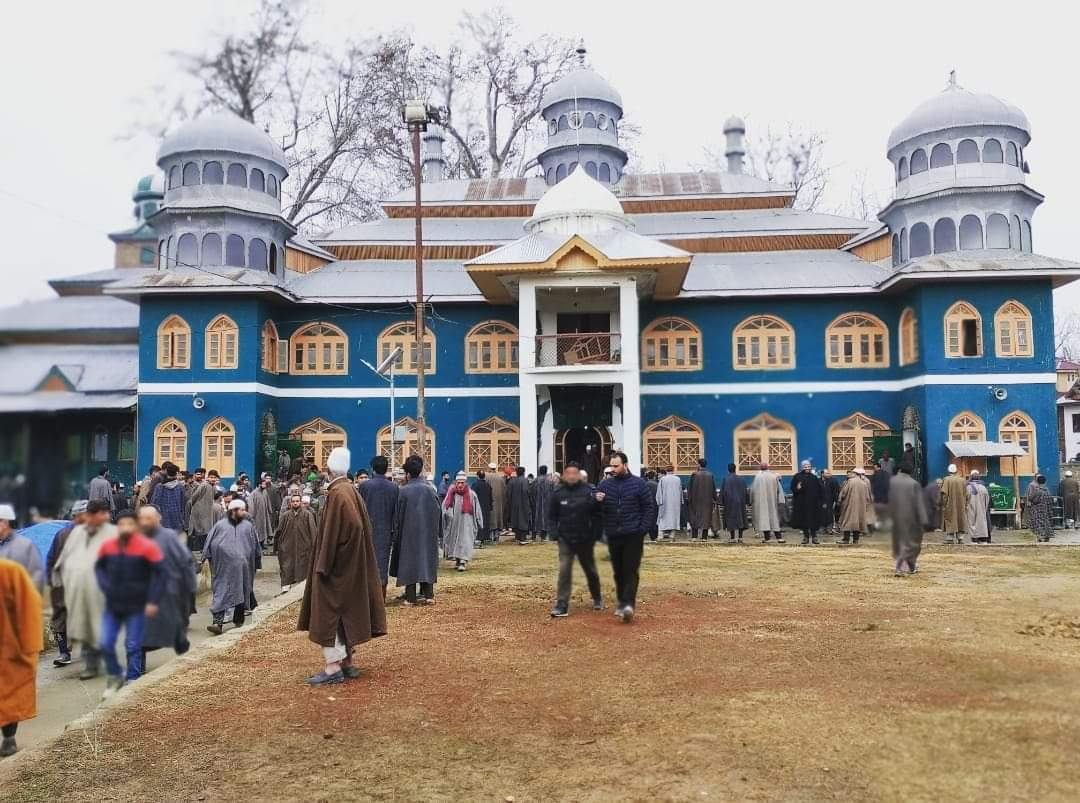
- Aasar-i-Shareef Pethmakhama

- Location within Jammu and Kashmir Location within India

Religion
- Affiliation: Islam
- District: Budgam District
- Region: Kashmir Valley
- Leadership: Jammu and Kashmir Muslim Waqf Board
- Status: Active

Location
- Location: Pethmakhama
- Municipality: Magam
- State: Jammu and Kashmir
- Country: India
- Territory: Jammu and Kashmir
- Coordinates: 34°04′12″N 74°35′41″E

Architecture
- Type: Islamic architecture
- Style: Classical

Specifications
- Length: 105 metres (344 ft)
- Width: 25 metres (82 ft)
- Dome: 1
- Minaret: 4

Website
- www.wakf.gov.in/jammukashmir/

The Aasar-i-Shareef Pethmakhama (Kashmiri: آثارِ شريف پؠٹھہٕ مَكهوٗم), popularly called Ziyarat Makhama ("Makhama Shrine"), is a Muslim shrine located in Pethmakhama, Magam, Budgam, Jammu and Kashmir, India. It contains a relic, Moi-e-Muqqadas, which is widely believed to be the hair of the Islamic prophet Muhammad. It is situated at Pethmakhama which is nearest to Magam Town of Budgam District and is considered to be one of the Kashmir's holiest Muslim shrine.

Aasar-i-Shareef is a two-storey building with four minarets and one central dome built on typical Kashmiri style of rooftop woodwork. The building can host approximately 2000 people at a time for prayers. It has a small mosque connected internally with the shrine building. There were 3 major Chinar trees in and around the shrine but one of them was later halved and remains there without branches. The courtyard of the shrine is made of carved stones and a large park area with inbuilt pathways leading to the shrine. Jammu and Kashmir Police guards the shrine with some 4-5 of its personal as security. The Jammu and Kashmir Waqf Board remains the caretaker of the Shrine.

== History ==
The relics of Muhammad brought in here on 17th Rajab-Ul-Murajab as per lunar calendar which as per Gregorian calendar was on 16-Nov-1932. from Saudi Arabia via the then Amritsar Punjab currently Pakistan. Some historians claim that the relics was brought on horse cart Up to Village Mazhama from Srinagar with a huge gathering of Kashmiri People reading verses and Naats on Prophet. The Moi-e-Muqadas has a long history dating back 1400 years as written in the Sanad (documentary proof) of Relics of Pethmakhama preserved along with it. The relics is preserved inside the building in a centralized space called as Noor Khwan. The relics of Muhammad at Pethmakhama is also mentioned in the books like Imam Ul Asar written by Anwar Shah Kashmiri during 19th century.

It is displayed to devotees on festive occasions like Mehraj ul-Alam and other festivals at Pethmakhama. This Dargah is one of the prolific historical monuments in District Budgam.

Lot of Ulama from all over Kashmir mostly from Sunni Aitiqadi sects like Karwan-I-Islami, Tehreek-e-Soutul Awliya, Tehreek Minhaj ul Islam Kashmir, Barelvi and other sects deliver sermons here. It is managed by Jammu and Kashmir Waqf Board and protected by Jammu and Kashmir Police.

Molvi Niyaz Hamdani Sahab is the one who is current authoritative person to display the relics given that he his forefathers had brought it to this place.

== Overview of Aasar-i-Shareef ==
Aasar-i-Shareef Pethmakhama is very famous in all corners of Kashmir because in this village shahi Hamdan has prayed for about 2 months and also there is beard of Muhammad is kept in the building. Thousands of people come to Pethmakhama during Mehraj un-Nabi and Miladunnabi The Building at Aasar-i-Shareef holds congregations of Fridays and special occasions on Eid and other Islamic festivals. During the festivals like Shab-i Mehraj and Shab-i Milad a Mela is celebrated in and around the shrine whereby lot of artisans, craftsmen and traders come to sell their items to the devotees. The main attraction for the devotees is Tilla Munji, the famous Kashmiri snack and Paratha which they take along with as a blessing.
