= Abdul Rashid Dawoodi =

Muslim scholar and preacher

Abdul Rashid Dawoodi Sheikh
- عبدالرّشيْد شيخ
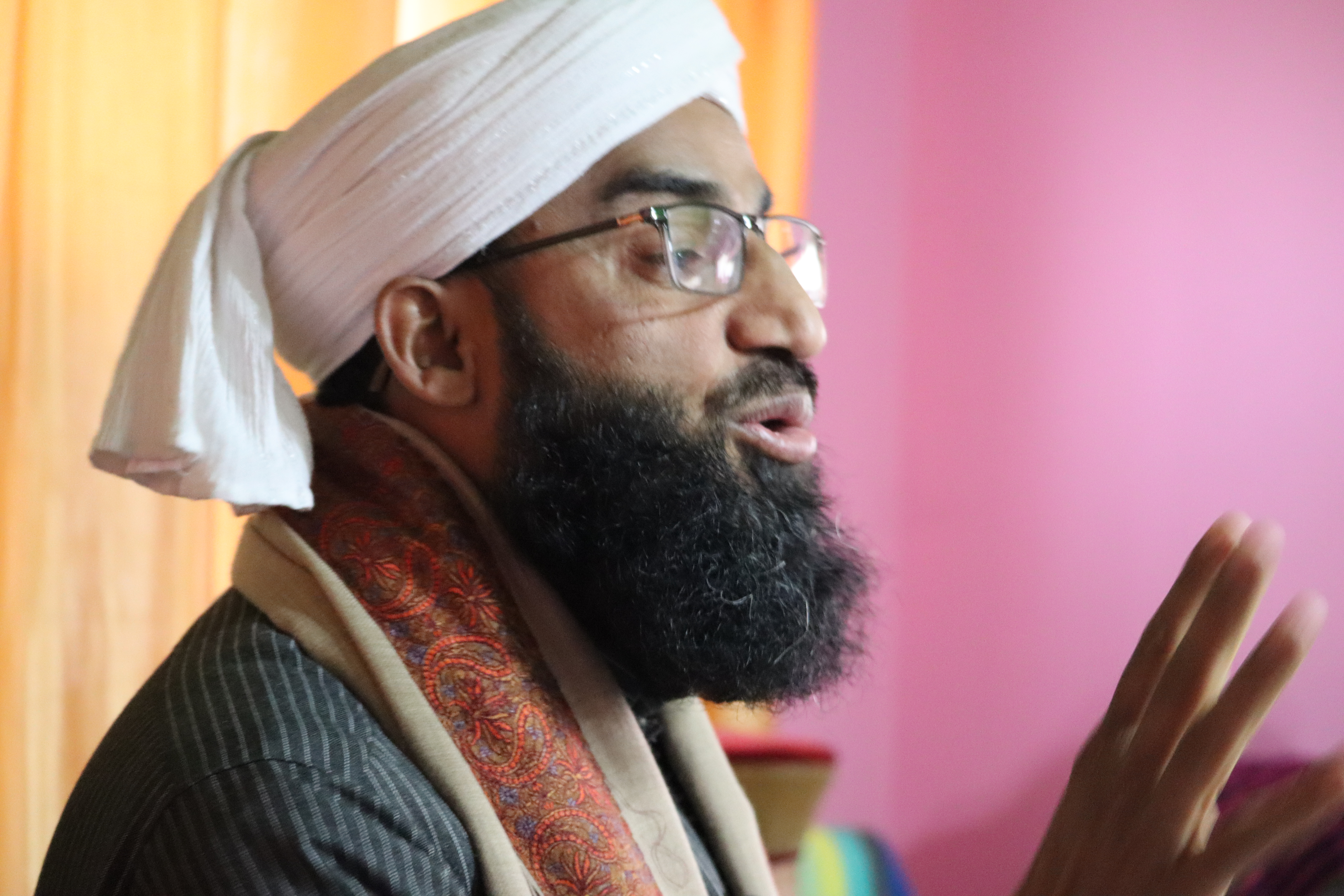

Personal life
- Born: Abdul Rashid Sheikh; 11 November 1979 (age 46) Budroo, Yaripora, Kulgam district
- Spouse: Jameela Banoo
- Children: Furqan Dawoodi
- Parent: Abdul Rahman Sheikh (father)
- Known for: Founder of Tehreek-e-Soutul Awliya
- Website: abdulrashiddawoodi.com

Religious life
- Religion: Islam
- Denomination: Sunni
- Jurisprudence: Hanafi
- Tariqa: Qadiriyya
- Creed: Maturidi
- Movement: Barelvi

Abdul Rashid Sheikh Dawoodi is a Sunni Muslim scholar and preacher, preacher and reformer from Jammu and Kashmir, who founded the Islamic organisation Tehreek-e-Soutul Awliya.

== Biography ==
Abdul Rashid Sheikh was born at Yaripora, Kulgam district. He was enrolled by his father, Sheikh Abdul Rahman, in a religious institute run at that time by Qazi Nisar. After Qazi Nisar died in 2005, he established an Islamic institute called Tehreek-e-Soutul Awliya,which promotes the teachings of the 19th-century Indian scholar Ahmed Raza Khan Barelvi of the Hanafi tradition.

In November 2006, he was wounded in a grenade attack while entering a mosque in Tahab area of Pulwama. Police alleged that the attack was instigated by the militant outfit Hizbul Mujahideen.

He believes that Islam is a religion of peace and advocates for Ulemas to issue fatwas (edicts) in accordance with the Quran and Sharia, than to please anyone. This statement was especially aimed at senior Saudi cleric Sheikh Abdul Aziz Al-Asheikh who, back in 2012, called for the banning and demolition of the churches in Kuwait. Dawoodi said that "there is no scope for violence in Islam".

In September 2022, he was arrested by the central government, without the police citing any details that led them to invoke the Public Safety Act against him. He was released after a year as the court quashed the detection order.

== See also ==
- Karwan-I-Islami
