= Waripora Bangil =

Village in Jammu and Kashmir, India

Bun makhama
- Village
- Bun makhama
- Location within Jammu and Kashmir Location within India
- Coordinates: 34.0749°N 74.6042°E
- Country: India
- Union territory: Jammu and Kashmir
- District: Budgam

Government
  - Sarpanch: presently vacant

Languages
  - Official: Kashmiri, Urdu, Hindi language, English
- Time zone: UTC+5:30 (IST)
- PIN: 193401
- Area code: 01951
- Vehicle registration: JK04
- Block: Rathsun
- Post Office: Magam
- Website: budgam.nic.in

Bun makhama is a village located in the town of magam in the Budgam district of the Indian-administered union territory of Jammu and Kashmir. It is situated 40 kilometres (25 mi) east of the district headquarters of Budgam, and about 20 kilometres (12 mi) west of the capital city of Srinagar.

The Postal Index Number of the area is 193401, and its postal head office is located in Magam. The closest cities to the village are Srinagar, Budgam. The nearest police station is 2.0 kilometres (1.2 mi) away from the village.

== Demographics ==
Kashmiri is the natively-spoken language in Waripora Bangil.

== Transport ==
=== Railways ===
Mazhom railway station is about 7 km (4.3 mi) far from this village. However, Udhampur railway station and Jammu Tawi railway station are the major railway stations located at a distance of 158 km (98 mi) and 175 km (109 mi) respectively.

=== Airports ===
Srinagar International Airport is the nearest airport to Waripora Bangil, located 28 km (17 mi) away. Jammu Airport is located 177 km (110 mi) from Waripora Bangil.

== Healthcare system ==
Sub-district hospital Magam is the main hospital located in the area. It is 2 km (1.2 mi) away from Waripora Bangil. SC Dhobiwan Health sub-center is another hospital located near Waripora Bangil.

== Educational institutions ==
=== Colleges ===
- Government degree College Magam.
- Government Degree College, Chandilora Tangmarg is 15 km (9.3 mi) away from Waripora Bangil.
- Government Boys Degree College, Khawaja-bagh Baramulla.

=== Schools ===
- BHSS Magam, is about 2 KM from Waripora Bangil.
- GHSS Lalpora, Kunzar is 2.5 km (1.6 mi) far from Waripora Bangil.
- Al Noor Model School located in Dobiwan, Kunzer is another school operating in the area. It is 500 m (0.50 km) away from Waripora Bangil.
- Bangil Educational Institute, Utikoo is the co-educational high school located 3 km (1.9 mi) away.
- Government Higher Secondary School Chandilora (15 km away).
- Oxford international school Waripora! since 2018.
