= Tehreek-e-Soutul Awliya =

Islamic organisation in Jammu and Kashmir

Tehreek-e-soutul awliya
- Abbreviation: T.S.A.
- Formation: 2006
- Founder: Abdul Rashid Dawoodi
- Founded at: Bagi Nawgam, Jammu and Kashmir, India
- Headquarters: Bagi Nawgam, Jammu and Kashmir, India
- Location: India
- Official language: Kashmiri, Urdu
- Chairman: Abdul Rashid Dawoodi Sheikh
- President: Fayaz Ahmed Bhat Razvi
- General Secretary: Muhammad Yusuf Baba
- Website: tsajk.org

Tehreek-e-soutul-Awliya (abbreviated as T.S.A. lit. 'Movement of the Voice of Saints'), also written as Tehreek-e-Soutul Auliya, is an Indian Islamic Barelvi Sunni religious seminary and non-governmental organization based in the Anantnag district of Jammu and Kashmir. It was founded by Abdul Rashid Dawooodi Sheikh in 2005 as a small seminary.

== History ==
Tehreek-e-Soutul Awliya was announced in 2005 by Abdul Rashid Dawoodi during an Islamic conference held in Anantnag district. Later, Fayaz Ahmed Bhat Razvi was appointed as its president, Muhammad Yusuf Baba as its general secretary and Mohammad Ishaq Dar Nizami as Joint Secretary TSA J&K.

As of 2022, the organisation had nearly 500 members.

In September 2022, Jammu and Kashmir government arrested Abdul Rashid Dawoodi along with other Islamic scholars on unknown grounds.

In September 2024, Soutul Awliya Jammu and kashmir laid the foundation stone of women's arabic school (Markazus Solihat).

== Activities ==
TSA organizes its annual conference whose proclaimed aim is to unite the Muslim community.

TSA established its new committee by the name (Soutul Awliya Samaj Sudhar Committee), the main object of the committee is to improve the social and economic welfare of the poor and to eradicate drugs and other social evils from the society

== See also ==
- Karwan-I-Islami
