= Pethmakhama =

- Village
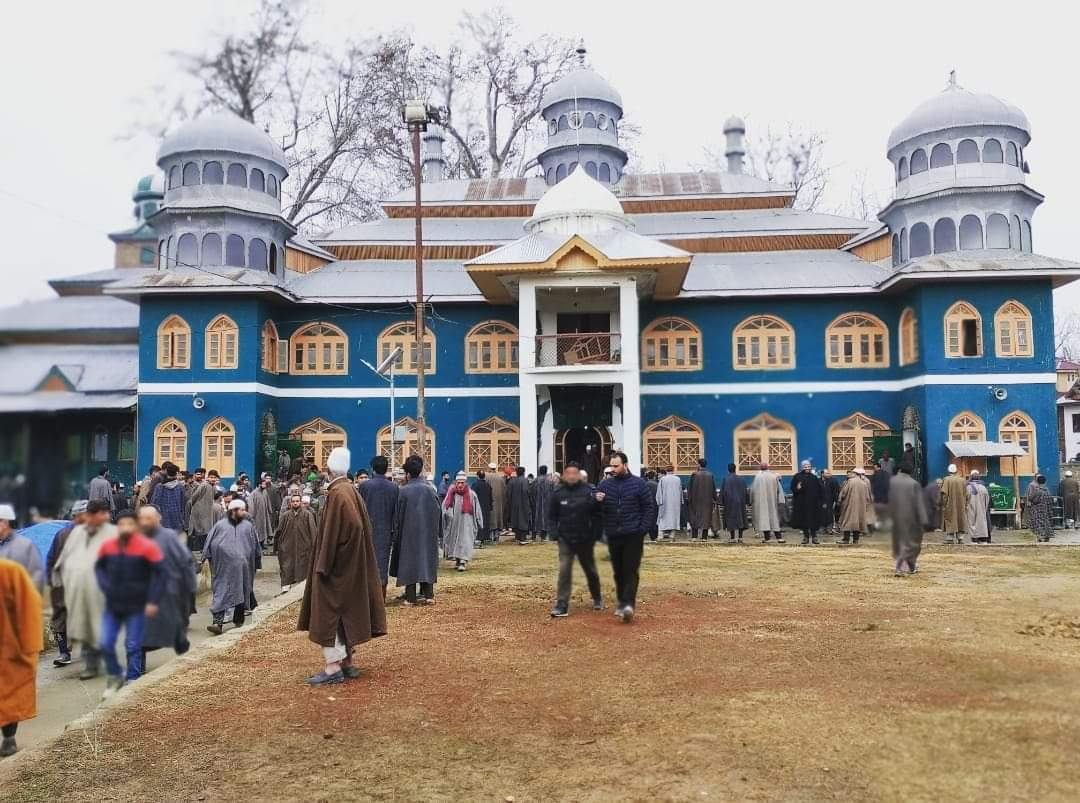
- Aastan i Aaliyah Mir Sayyid Ali Hamadani Pethamkhama

- Location in Budgam, Jammu and Kashmir Pethmakhama (India)
- Coordinates: 34°04′12″N 74°35′41″E
- Country: India
- State: Jammu and Kashmir
- District: Budgam

Government
  - Sarpanch: Shakeela Bano
  - Numberdar: Ab Rashid Dar
  - Village Guard: Ghulam Rasool Ganai
- Elevation: 1,740 m (5,710 ft)

Population (2011)
  - Total: 4,646

Languages
  - Official: Kashmiri, Urdu, Hindi, Dogri, English
- Time zone: UTC+5:30 (IST)
- PIN: 193401
- Area code: +91-1954 BSNL Landline

Pethmakhama is a village in Budgam district, in the Indian administrative union territory of Jammu and Kashmir. It falls under the administrative division of tehsil Magam. It is famous for the shrine of Mir Sayyid Ali Hamadani who stayed at various places in and around Kashmir and one example is Pethmakhama where he prayed for around two months. The stone on which he prayed there, has the marks of praying on it miraculously and is preserved at Aasar-i-Shareef Pethmakhama. The shrine also hosts beard hair as one of the holy Relics of Muhammad which is displayed to the devotees every year on the auspicious occasion of Mehraj ul Alam and other festivals. Pethmakhama is irrigated throughout the year by River Sukhnag which is a tributary of Jhelum River and various springs in the village.

== Demographics ==
According to the 2011 Census of India, 621 families reside in Pethmakhama, comprising a total population of 4,646; 21.42% of the population (995 people) are children aged 0–6. The average sex ratio is 959, higher than Jammu and Kashmir State's average of 889. There are 910 women for every 1000 men. In 2011, the village literacy rate was 57.66%, compared to the 67.16% overall for Jammu and Kashmir. Male literacy stood at 65.64% while female literacy was 49.44%. According to the constitution of India and the Panchyati Raj Act., Pethmakhama village is administrated by Sarpanch (Head of Village), an elected representative of the village.

Demographics
	Percent
Male ♂	51.05%
Female ♀	48.94%
Male and female population

Religions
Religion	Percent
Suni Muslims	100%
Others	0%
Distribution of population on religion.

== Location ==
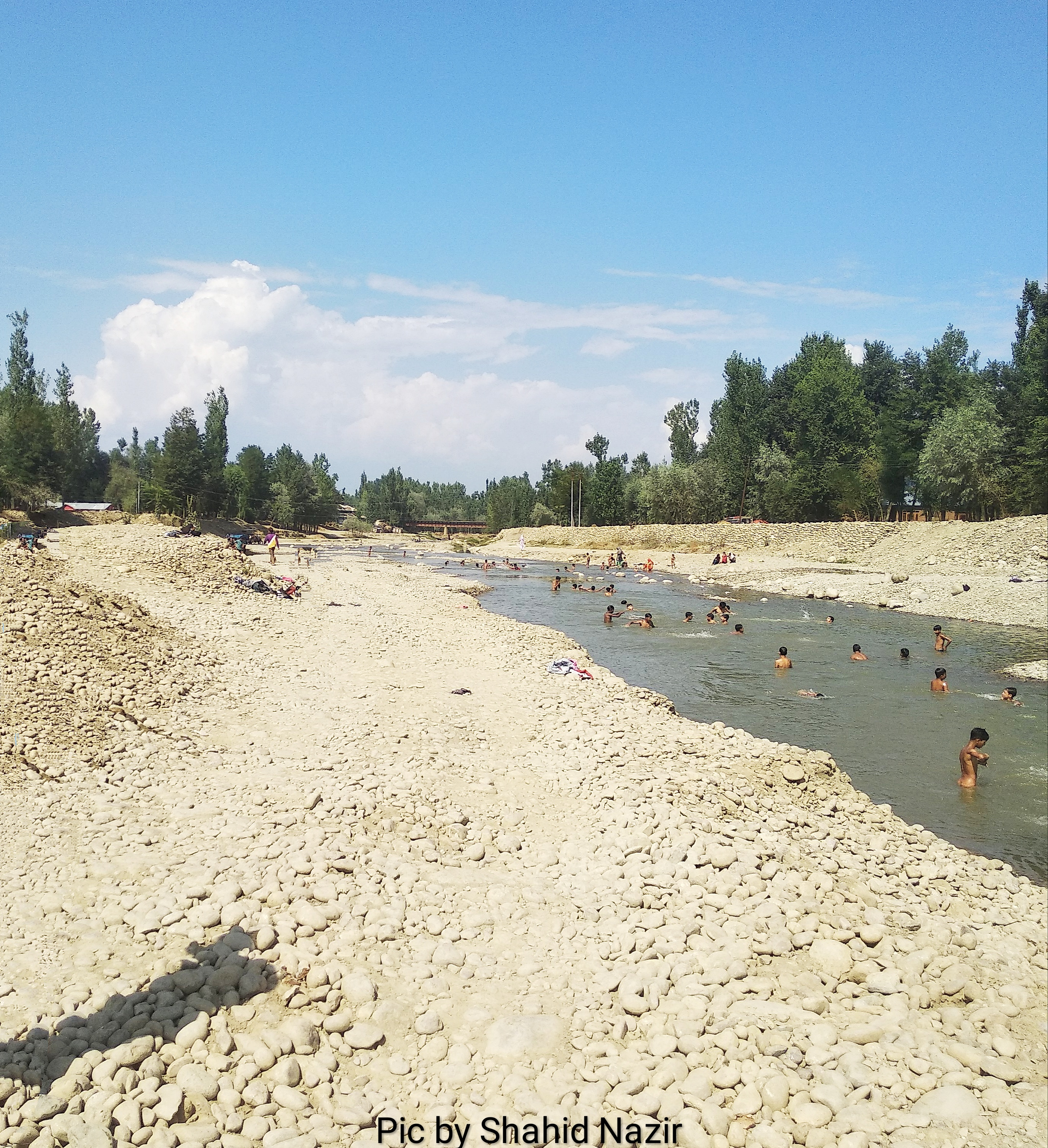
River Sukhnag Pethmakhama in June 2020

Pethmakhama is situated on the bank of the river Sukhnag, about 23 km (14 mi) to the north of the district headquarters, Budgam. The adjacent villages of Pethmakhama are Badran, Magam, Aripanthan, Rathson, Bonmakhama, and Kanihama.

== Schools ==
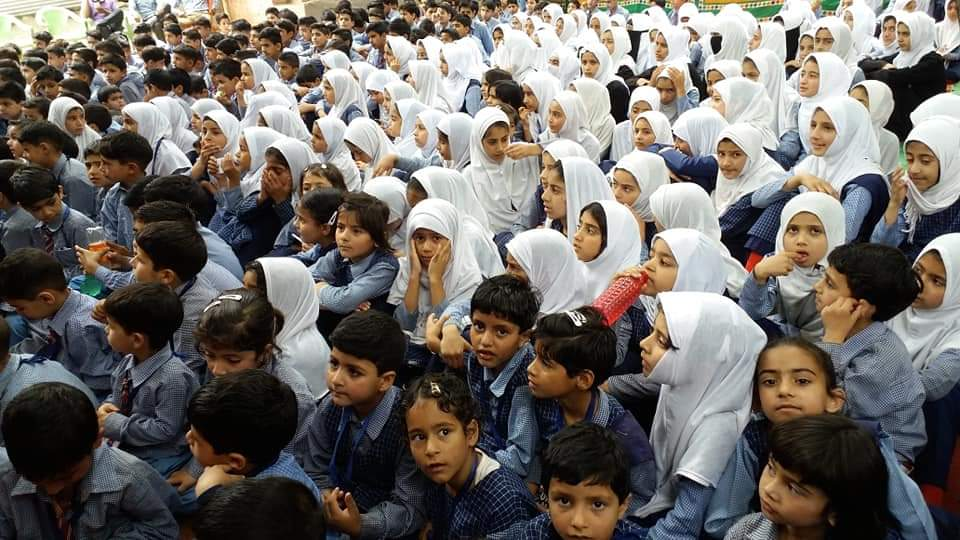
Students of Sukhnag Educational Institute Morning assembly in April 2020

- Government High School for Boys, Pethmakhama
- Government Middle School for Girls, Pethmakhama
- Sukhnag Educational Institute, Pethmakhama
- Ps Dangerpora Pethmakhama Upgr School, Pethmakhama

== Transport ==
=== Roads ===
Pethmakhama is connected to Srinagar via Magam and is connected via Sanoor Kalipora to Budgam district headquarters. Beerwah 14 km away is connected to Pethmakhama via Aripanthan also via Rathsoon. It is also connected to Tehsil Khag via Aripanthan, 16 km (9.9 mi) away. The road connecting Pethmakhama with Magam was paved but remains with some potholes.

=== Rails ===
The nearest railway stations are Mazhom railway station and Budgam railway station.
