= Ohangam =

Village in Jammu and Kashmir

Ohangam/Wuhangam
- Village
- Location in Jammu and Kashmir, India Ohangam/Wuhangam (India)
- Coordinates: 34°02′25″N 74°35′42″E
- Country: India
- Union territory: Jammu and Kashmir
- District: Budgam
- Tehsil: Beerwah
- Founder: not known.

Government
  - Type: Panchayat

Languages
  - Official: Kashmiri, Urdu, Hindi, Dogri, English
- Time zone: UTC+5:30 (IST)
- PIN: 193401
- Vehicle registration: JK04

Ohangam is a village in tehsil Beerwah of district Budgam of the Jammu and Kashmir. its population is about 3500. The famous Kashmiri poet and author of Kashmiri folktale Heemal Nagrai, Waliullah Mattu is from the same village. The shrine of famous Sufi saint Baba Hanief Ud Din Reshi is lacated in the North East of Ohangam.

== See also ==
- Chewdara
- Rathsoon
- Aripanthan
- Sonapah
- Wanihama
- Meerpora
- Beerwah
- Arwah
