= Kandoora =

Village in Northern India

Kandoora Kondur
- Village
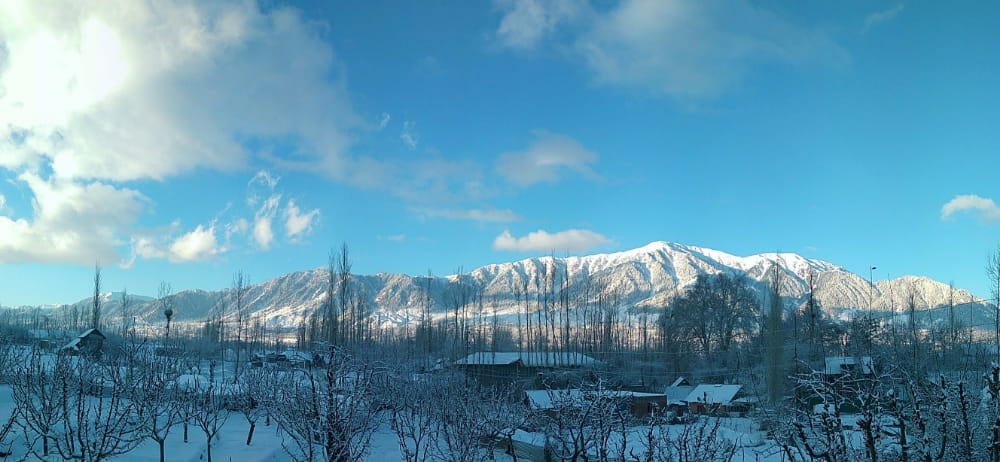

- Location within India
- Coordinates: 33.9923°N 74.5837°E
- Country: India
- Union territory: Jammu and Kashmir
- Division: Kashmir division
- District: Budgam district
- Tehsil (Subdistrict): Beerwah
- Named for: Field of stones

Government
  - Type: Panchayati raj
  - Body: Gram panchayat (Village council)
  - Sarpanch: Vacant
  - Moqdam: Ab Lateef Sheik

Area
  - Total: 200 ha (490 acres)
- Elevation: 1,580 m (5,180 ft)
- Highest elevation (Bhag de Shafie): 1,616 m (5,302 ft)
- Lowest elevation (Mahal): 1,520 m (4,990 ft)

Population (2020)
  - Total: 3,700
  - Density: 825/km^{2} (2,140/sq mi)
- Demonym: Kandoorians or Kondreek

Languages
  - Official: Kashmiri; Urdu; English

Language
  - Spoken: Kashmiri
- Time zone: UTC+5:30 (IST)
- PIN INDIA: 193411
- Vehicle registration: JK04

Kondur or Kandoora is the largest village in the Sukhnag River valley, located on the eastern banks of the Sukhnag River. It lies on the Beerwah-to-Doodhpathri road and is 26 kilometres (16 mi) from Srinagar, the largest city and summer capital of the union territory of Jammu and Kashmir, which is the southern portion of the wider Indian-administered Kashmir region.

Kandoora is a rural village, with agriculture its main economic activity. It is a Muslim community, with the inhabitants' first language being Koshur (Kashmiri), with other languages in use for particular purposes.

== Etymology ==
The village name, Kandoora, derives from Kashmiri: کَنِۂ, romanized: kanie, lit. 'stone', and ڈُور, doour, lit. 'field', together signifying 'field of stones'. The land on which the village of Kandoora is situated is rocky.

== Village administration ==
Kandoora is in the Beerwah subdivision of Budgam district, and governance of Kandoora is by representative democracy. The village is governed by a gram panchayat or village council, according to the 1996 Panchayats Act. Its panchayat has eleven members, with each member representing a ward constituency. Each ward has its ward representative.

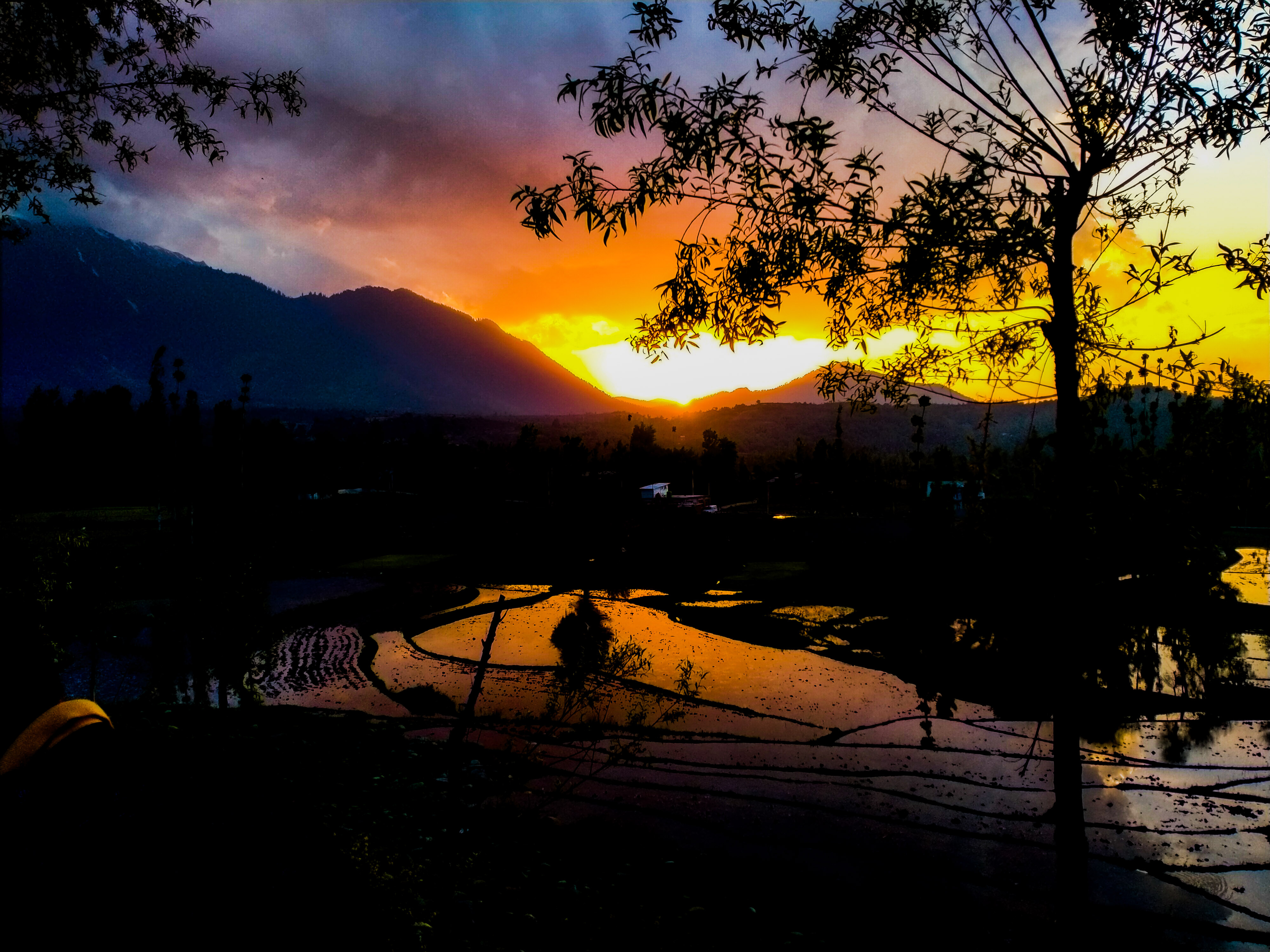
View of a sunset in Kandoora

== Geography ==
Kandoora is a rural village, one of 102 inhabited villages in the Beerwah tehsil. It has a land area of 199.87 hectares (493.9 acres). Nearest to Kandoora is Beerwah, approximately 2 kilometres (1.2 mi) distant (measured from Beerwah's bus stand), with the Beerwah tehsil headquarters, about 3 kilometres (1.9 mi) away. Beerwah, along with Sodipora, lies to the north of Kandoora. Also neighbouring the village are the surrounding locations of Sonapah to the northeast; Rankipora and Khatiruna to the east; Larbal to the southeast; Peth Zanigaam and Latinae to the south; Sail and Bun Zanigaamin to the southwest; Kanigund in the west; and Goriepora and Gohlar to the northwest.

=== Village layout ===
Kandoora is internally divided into Neiber Kandoora (neiber, meaning, 'spread out' or 'peripheral'), and Gamander Kandoora (gamander, meaning, 'downtown' or 'central portion').

- Neiber Kandoora has:
  - Hajamabad
  - Najarabad
  - Brandaker
  - Gamudd
  - Ghatpur
  - Sheikhpur
  - Malikpur
- Gamander Kandoora is composed of:
  - Bunpur
  - Pethpur
  - Mirpur (part)
  - Hajamabad (part)
  - Najarabad (part)
  - Old Graveyard of Kandoora
  - Masheed-e-Aungun (centre)

There are several planned or specially built communities within Kandoora. Such communities are widely known as colonies within the subcontinent. The Kandoorian colonies are: Zandwan; Sheikh ul Alam; Gousia; and Larbal.

==== Village roads ====
Roads interior to the village include:

- Ghatpur-Masheed e Aungun Street
- Diversion-Malikpur Street
- Diversion-Nagpur Street
- Sheikhpur-Batehar Street
- Gamudd-Maxelum Street
- Maxelumm-Aawrenea Street
- Batehar Street

=== Area road system ===
Kandoora is well connected to its neighbouring villages by link road. The roads meet internally in the administrative centre, central Kandoora, locally called Masheed-e-Aungun.

The roads are:

1. Kandoora-Larbal Link road - 1.5 km (0.93 mi)
2. Kandoora-Khatiruna Link road - 1.7 km (1.1 mi)
3. Kandoora-Latina Link Road - 1.9 km (1.2 mi)
4. Kandoora-Zaniegaam Link Road - 2 km (1.2 mi)
5. Kandoora-Rankipora Link Road - 1.8 km (1.1 mi)
6. Kandoora-Kaniegund Link Road - 1.7 km (1.1 mi)
7. Kandoora-Sail Link Road - 2 km (1.2 mi)
8. Kandoora-Sodiepora Link Road - 2.4 km (1.5 mi)
9. Kandoora-Arizal Road - 11 km (6.8 mi)

The village can be accessed from:

1. Budgam
  - Budgam-Kandoora Road, via Sonpah
2. Beerwah
  - Beerwah-Doodhpathri Road, via Sonpah
  - Beerwah-Kandoora Road, via Rankipora
3. Khag
  - Kandoora-Khag Road, via Malpora and Sail
4. Khan Sahib
  - Kandoora-Khan Sahib Road, via Pethkoot

== Economy ==
The economy of Kandoora is generally agrarian, being derived from agriculture and horticultural produce. The horticultural sector is on the rise, with the help of Sher-e-Kashmir University of Agricultural Sciences and Technology of Jammu (SKUAST-J) and Sher-e-Kashmir University of Agricultural Sciences and Technology of Kashmir. Many apple orchards are being developed and this sector is expected to boost the local economy.

The production and sale of Kashmiri handicrafts, such as Kashmiri shawls, is another avenue for earning income available to Kandoorians.

== People and culture ==
The village population is Muslim and includes adherents of Sunni Islam, schools of Hanafi, Salafism, and Barelvi branches or schools of Islam.

Disputes are usually brought before the local jirga to be resolved. The jirga is an assembly of local Kandoora chieftains. This traditional gathering of leaders has been adapted by Kashmiri Muslims from its origins in erstwhile North-West Frontier Province (NWFP) and Afghanistan.

The mother tongue of Kandoora locals is Koshur (Kashmiri). Several other languages are occasionally used, including Urdu, English, Persian, Arabic and Hindi.

=== Demographics ===
The majority of adult Kandoora residents work or in agriculture and its associated occupations. There are some government employees. Teenagers and young adults may continue as students, attending further education at institutions in the wider district.

Kandoora village: Enumeration and basic demographic details
Detail	Total	Males	Males %	Females	Females %	Sex ratio	Notes
Population	2,774	1,492	53.8	1,282	46.2	859	Sex ratio is no. of females per 1000 males
Child (0-6)	677	407	60.1	270	39.9	601	
Literacy; (Tot. literacy rate: 61.56% of pop. aged 7yrs+)	1,291	791	72.90	500	49.41	613	All figures calculated as effective literacy rate: Based on population of those 7yrs and over.
In paid work	707	570	80.6	137	19.4	240	
Marginal worker	577	453	78.5	124	21.5	274	
No. of households	479						Source: Census 2011, 15th National census of India

=== Clans ===
The clans living within Kandoora include:

- Ahanger
- Alaiee
- Bhat
- Chopan
- Dar
- Dev
- Ganiee
- Hajam
- Khan
- Lone
- Magrey
- Malik
- Malla
- Mir
- Mughal
- Najar
- Pandit
- Parry
- Rather
- Reshi
- Sheikh
- Syed
- Wani
- Zarger

=== Religious institutions and organisations ===
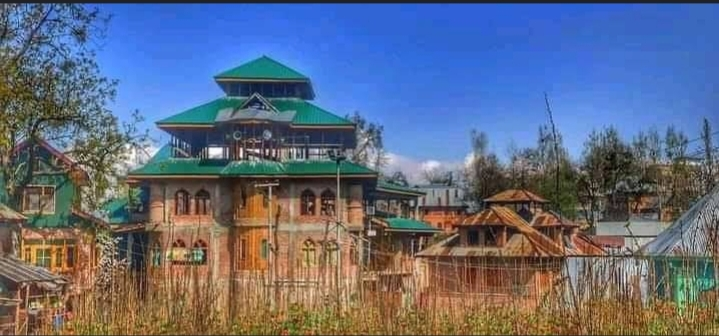
Jamia Masjid Kandoora

The township has halqa level bodies of:

- Karwan-I-Islami International, Jammu and Kashmir
- Jamiat-e-Ahle Hadith, J&K, Jammu and Kashmir

The village has six masjids, including two jama masjids:

- Grand Jamia Hanafiyah, Kandoora (in central Masheed-e-Aungun area)
- Chanpur Masjid e Shareef (in Chanpur)
- Masjid e Ramzaan a mosque of the Hanafi school in Sheikhpur
- Masjid e Gousiya, of the Barelvi school in Diversion colony
- Jamia Masjid Ahle hadith (Mohammad Bin Abdul Wahab RA) in which local Muslims observe Friday prayers, in Mirpur
- Masjid e Salafiyah, in Ghat Pur, a Salafi School masjid

=== Sports ===
Sports played locally include:

- Cricket
- Volleyball
- Kabaddi
- Kho kho
- Rugby

== Education ==
The village has a literacy rate of nearly 62 per cent, according to the 2011 census. This is somewhat lower than the literacy rate of 67.16 per cent in Jammu and Kashmir overall.

=== Islamic religious education ===
The village of Kandoora has three Islamic educational institutions:

- Imam e Azam Institute of Islamic Studies, a Hanafi institution
- Institute of Islamic Theology and Jurisprudence (Urdu: درسگاہ تعلیم القران والحدیث نبویہ)
- Shah e Hamdan Institute of Islamic Studies, named in honour of Mir Sayyid Ali Hamadani

=== Independent schools ===
- Islamic Educational Institute Kandoora (IEI, Kandoora), established in 1986

This institution is the first private school in valley of the River Sukhnaag.

=== Post-primary schools ===
- Government Girls Middle School, Kandoora:
  Established in 1975 in order to educate girls locally, past the primary school level.
- The Government Boys Higher Secondary Institute, Kandoora:
  Established 1953 as a primary school. In 1963 it was upgraded to middle school level and then, in 1971, to the high school level. It attained a higher secondary school level in 2018. This higher secondary school feeds Government Degree College, Beerwah. The institute was only the second school in the area, after the Government Boys Senior Secondary Institute School, Beerwah, established in 1953.

=== Primary schools ===
- Government Boys Primary School, Chanpur
- Government Boys Primary School, Malik Pur

== See also ==
- Districts of Jammu and Kashmir
