= Kani Shawl =

Type of Kashmiri shawl

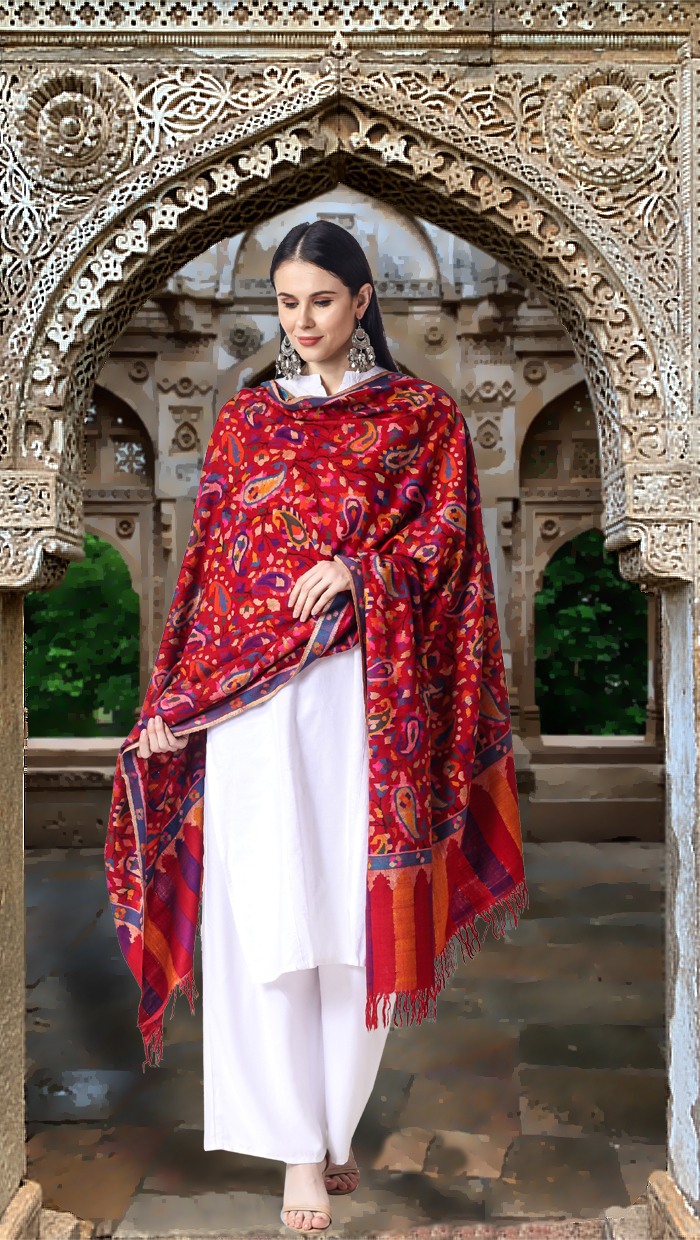
Image of a worn Kani shawl

The Kani shawl is a type of Kashmiri shawl originating from the Kanihama area of the Kashmir Valley of Jammu and Kashmir, India. It is one of the oldest handicrafts of India's Kashmir. This craft has been a part of the valley since the time of Mughals. The shawls are woven from pashmina yarn. The government of Government of Jammu and Kashmir has granted a geographical indication to the Kani shawl, making it illegal to sell shawls made outside of the Kanihama area as Kani shawls.

== History ==
Kani weaving is believed to be an art indigenous to Kanihama in Kashmir, India, and traced back to 3000 BC. This exquisite shawl was once coveted by Mughal Kings, Sikh Maharajas and British Aristocrats. The Ain-i-Akbari records that Emperor Akbar was an avid collector of Kani shawls.

While the name 'Kani' comes from the area where these particular artisans come from, Kanihama, the word 'Kani' - in Kashmiri - also means a small wooden oblong spool.

== Preparation ==
Kani Shawls are made from pashmina on a handloom. Instead of a shuttle used in regular pashmina shawls, Kani Shawls use needles made from cane or wood. The kanis, or small wooden sticks, are used to create the intricate designs of the shawl. Each kani represents one knot in the weave, and the weaver must follow a graph paper design closely to ensure that the design is accurately replicated.

Only trained craftsmen are knowledgeable enough to weave Kani Shawls properly. The techniques and knowledge have been transferred from forefathers to next generations. It is estimated that of the 10,000-odd kani weavers, only 2,000 are left today. An artisan skilled in carpet weaving can more easily make a Kani shawl because both crafts involve using color coding, known as "Talim," to help guide the weaving process. While there are some differences in techniques and tools, the fundamental principle of following the color-coded Talim remains the same. However, Kani shawl making is a specialized art form with different challenges that make it hard to replicate normally, and skilled artisans in this craft produce the most considered exquisite and authentic Kani shawls, preserving its traditional heritage.

== See also ==
Kashmiri handicrafts
