= Malpora =

Village in Jammu & Kashmir, India

- Village
- Malpur
- Aerial view of Malpora (Malpur), Narvaw, Baramulla,

- Location in Jammu and Kashmir, India Malpora (India)
- Coordinates: 34.0921°N 74.4775°E
- Country: India
- union territory: Jammu & Kashmir
- District: Baramulla

Malpora (Malpur), Narvaw, Baramulla, Jammu and Kashmir. Malpora, also known as Malpur, is a village in the Narvaw area of Baramulla district, Jammu and Kashmir, India, located approximately 12 km from Baramulla town. Situated in the Kashmir Valley, the village is known for its educational achievements, busy local market, religious institutions, public facilities and surrounding natural landscape. It serves as a commercial and transport centre for several neighbouring villages, with roads connecting it to nearby communities. Kashmiri is the principal language spoken by its residents.

Overview

Malpora, also known as Malpur, is a village situated in the Sheeri block of Narvaw tehsil in Baramulla district, Jammu and Kashmir, India. Located approximately 12 kilometres from Baramulla town, the village forms part of the Kashmir Valley and is surrounded by the natural beauty of the region’s mountainous landscape, green fields and nearby hills. Kashmiri is the principal local language spoken by residents.

Malpora is known locally for its educational achievements, busy marketplace, religious institutions, public utilities and connections with neighbouring villages. Its central location and commercial activity make it an important local centre for shopping, transportation and everyday services.

Education and Academic Achievements

Education holds an important place in the social development of Malpora. Many students from the village have graduated from Government Degree College Baramulla and Government Women’s Degree College Baramulla, institutions affiliated with the University of Kashmir.

Some residents have pursued postgraduate studies and master’s degrees at various universities across India. Students from Malpora have also obtained professional qualifications, including Bachelor of Engineering degrees and MBBS degrees from institutions in Jammu and Kashmir.

The village has residents working in different government departments of Jammu and Kashmir, with a notable presence in the Education Department. Other residents are employed in private-sector organisations and various professions, while some work abroad, particularly in Gulf countries.

Employment and Traditional Occupations

Malpora’s workforce includes government employees, professionals, skilled workers, business owners and artisans. Several residents serve in different departments of the Jammu and Kashmir Government, contributing to public administration, education and other essential services.

Traditional occupations and skilled trades remain part of local economic life. Artisans, masons and other construction workers provide services to residents of Malpora and surrounding villages. These occupations contribute to the local economy and support ongoing construction and development.

Commercial Centre and Main Market

One of Malpora’s prominent features is its busy main market, located around the village’s central four-way junction. Compared with many neighbouring villages, Malpora has a substantial concentration of shops and commercial establishments. Its market attracts customers from surrounding villages who visit to purchase groceries, household essentials, building materials, food products and other daily necessities.

The marketplace includes a variety of businesses, such as:

- Grocery and general stores
- Fruit and vegetable shops
- Electronics and electrical shops
- Hardware and welding shops
- Mobile phone repair shops
- Medical shops and pharmacies
- Bakeries and confectionery shops
- Chicken and dairy shops
- Wazwan and traditional food outlets
- Rice mills and flour mills
- Gas agency and other retail establishments

The variety of businesses makes the market a convenient destination for residents of Malpora and neighbouring communities. The movement of shoppers, workers and passengers contributes to its commercial importance.

Transportation and Connectivity

Malpora has a central four-way junction that functions as an important local transport point. It serves as a bus and taxi stand, providing transportation for passengers travelling to and from the village.

Several roads connect Malpora with neighbouring villages, allowing residents to access the main market, educational institutions, workplaces and other essential services. These road connections also help bring customers and visitors into the village, supporting its role as a local commercial centre.

Natural Environment and Waterways

Malpora is situated within the wider landscape of the Kashmir Valley, with nearby hills and natural surroundings contributing to its scenic character. The Mujnar Hills are a notable local geographical feature and are used by residents, including schoolchildren, for recreational outings and picnics.

Two waterways are identified by local residents on the outskirts of the village: Venme Nallah and Mundri Nallah. According to local accounts, these streams originate in the upper mountainous areas towards Gulmarg, where snow and seasonal meltwater contribute to the region’s watercourses.

The surrounding natural environment is an important part of village life, providing opportunities for recreation and connecting Malpora with the wider mountain landscape of northern Kashmir.

Public Infrastructure and Essential Facilities

Malpora has several public and community facilities that serve residents and, in some cases, neighbouring villages.

Water Supply

A large water-filtration plant is situated on elevated ground above the village. The facility is reported locally to have an approximate project value of ₹2 crore and supplies treated water to Malpora’s residents. It represents an important part of the village’s water-supply infrastructure.

Electricity Infrastructure

A receiving station operated by the Jammu and Kashmir Power Development Department (JKPDD/JKPDCL) is among the important electricity-related facilities serving the area. It supports the local electricity distribution infrastructure.

Playground and Recreation

A large playground is under construction in Malpora. The village also has access to recreational space around Mujnar Hills, which residents and school groups use for outdoor activities and picnics.

Gymnasium

A gymnasium is situated in the main market area, providing residents with a local facility for exercise and physical fitness.

Gas Distribution

A gas agency operates in the village, providing access to domestic cooking-gas services for local households and the surrounding area.

Religious Institutions

Mosques play an important role in Malpora’s religious and community life. The village has five mosques:

1. Jamia Masjid — the principal congregational mosque, reported locally to accommodate approximately 4,000 worshippers at a time.
2. Masjid Rehmat
3. Masjid Bagh-e-Jannat
4. Masjid Noor
5. Masjid Razak

These mosques provide spaces for daily prayers, Friday congregations, religious education and community gatherings. Jamia Masjid is particularly significant for larger congregations and important religious occasions.

Educational Institutions

Malpora has local educational facilities that serve children and young people in the village.

- IMHSF Private High School — a privately operated educational institution.
- GMS Malpora — a government middle school serving school-age children.

Students also attend educational institutions in nearby areas and Baramulla town, including degree colleges and other institutions offering higher and professional education.

Social and Community Life

Malpora’s community life reflects a combination of educational aspirations, public employment, entrepreneurship, traditional skills and religious activity. Families maintain connections with neighbouring villages through commerce, transportation, education and social relationships.

The presence of a busy market, multiple mosques, educational institutions and public utilities makes the village a focal point for many everyday activities. Its residents contribute to local development through government service, business, skilled trades and employment in other parts of India and abroad.

Conclusion

Malpora (Malpur) is a village in the Narvaw area of Baramulla district with a notable combination of educational progress, commercial activity, public infrastructure and community institutions. Its central marketplace, transport junction, water-filtration plant, electricity infrastructure, schools, mosques and recreational facilities contribute to its importance within the surrounding area.

With its growing infrastructure, diverse workforce, access to education and connections with neighbouring villages, Malpora represents a locally significant community within the Kashmir Valley.

== Geography ==
Malpora is situated Under the foothills of Mujnar Hills in the Narvaw Valley. This village is 13 kilometers away from Baramulla Town.
