= Kanihama =

Village in Jammu and Kashmir, India

Kanihama Kanihoam
- Village in Budgam
- Kanihama
- Location in Jammu and Kashmir, India Kanihama (India)
- Coordinates: 33.4238°N 74.5429°E
- Country: India
- Union Territory: Jammu and Kashmir
- District: Budgam

Languages
  - Official: Kashmiri, Urdu, Hindi, Dogri, English
- Time zone: UTC+5:30 (IST)
- PIN: 193401

Kanihama or Kanihoam formerly known as Gund Kawarhama, is a village situated on the Srinagar-Gulmarg road in the Budgam district of Jammu and Kashmir in India. The Kani Shawls produced in the area were given a geographical indication status by the government of Jammu and Kashmir, making it illegal to sell shawls made outside of the Kanihama area as Kani shawls.

Kanihama is surrounded by Narbal Block towards east, Magam Block towards west, Pattan Block towards north, Badgam Block towards South. This place is near the border of the Budgam and Baramulla district.

Kanihama was given a status of handloom village by the government of Jammu and Kashmir as the village is primarily known for its handloom products like Pashmina Shawal, Kani Shawl, etc. all over the globe. Under the project the village is being beautified and developed to encourage the tourism.

A school namely Kashmir Public school was established here in the year 2015 by a well-known educationist Altaf Naqshbandi.

== See also ==
- Gogjigund
- Ichgam
- Budgam
- Srinagar
