= Karwan-i-Islami =

Religious organization in Kashmir

Karwan-I-Islami
Founder
- Ghulam Rasool Hami

Religions
- Islam (Sunni Barelvi)

Scriptures
- Quran, Hadith and Sunnat; Jurisprudence: Hanafi

Karwan-I-Islami (or Carvaan-e-Islami) is a religious organization established in 2004 in Jammu and Kashmir, India. It "is an amalgam of [the] biggest Barelvi organisation[s] in Kashmir having 40 constituents". According to the organisation's website, it has 1,100 members, and is organised in 12 departments/units, which report to the central committee. The Secretary General (Ghulam Rasool Hami) is the head of all 12 departments/units.

The organisation is known for its campaigns to ban liquor, and against restrictions placed by the central government of India on the Triple Talaq. It is also notable for levelling allegations of fraud against the School Education Department of Kashmir, claiming money was being allocated to "non-existent" schools.

The president and chairman of the organisation is Ghulam Rasool Hami. In 2016, Hami appealed for people to "come forward and talk to each other" as a means of ending the Kashmir conflict. In 2018, he criticised what he claimed was a "meagre monthly salary" being paid to imams, and proposed a bill to increase their salary.
