= Wanihama =

Village In Jammu and Kashmir

Wanihama Weainhoam (وٲنؠ ہوم)
- Village
- Country: India
- Union territory: Jammu and Kashmir
- District: Budgam
- Tehsil: Beerwah

Government
  - Type: Panchayat

Population (2011)
  - Total: 771

Languages
  - Official: Kashmiri, Urdu, Hindi, English
- Time zone: UTC+5:30 (IST)
- PIN: 193401
- Vehicle registration: JK04
- Sex Ratio: 394♀/ 377♂

Wanihama or Weainhoam is a village in the tehsil of Beerwah, Budgam district, Jammu and Kashmir, India.
