= Rathsun =

- Village
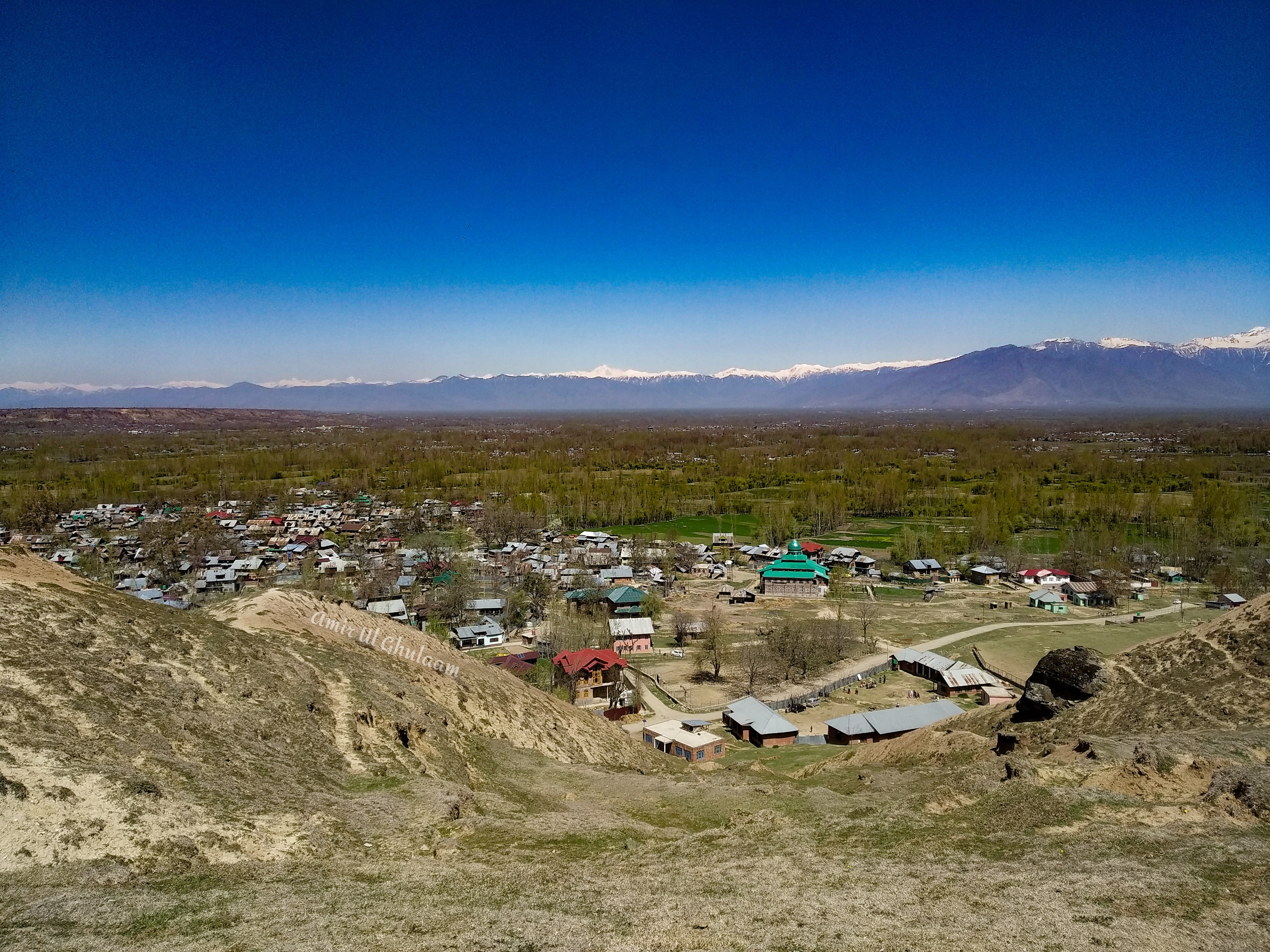
- Rathsun, Beerwah, Budgam, Kashmir

- Location in Jammu and Kashmir, India Rathsun (India)
- Coordinates: 34°00′20″N 74°35′05″E
- Country: India
- Union territory: Jammu and Kashmir
- District: Budgam
- Tehsil: Beerwah

Government
  - Type: Panchayat

Area
  - Total: 4.44 km^{2} (1.71 sq mi)
- Elevation: 1,595 m (5,233 ft)

Population (2011)
  - Total: 5,907
  - Density: 1,330/km^{2} (3,450/sq mi)

Languages
  - Official: Kashmiri, Urdu, Hindi, Dogri, English
- Time zone: UTC+5:30 (IST)
- PIN: 193401
- Vehicle registration: JK04
- Sex Ratio: 851 ♀/ 1000 ♂

Rathsun or Rathsoon is a village and block located in Budgam district, Jammu and Kashmir. It is situated at the base of the Pir Panjal Range of the Himalayas. It falls under the administrative division of Beerwah tehsil, one of the nine tehsils of Budgam district. It is about 23.7 kilometres (14.7 mi) via Beerwah-Budgam Road from district headquarters Budgam, It is 7 km (4.3 mi) from Beerwah and 29 km (18 mi) from Srinagar, the summer capital of Jammu and Kashmir, the summer capital of Jammu and Kashmir. Magam is the nearest town to Rathsun (approximately 4 kilometres (2.5 mi) away).The shrine of the Sufi saint Baba Hanifudin Reshi is situated on a hill overlooking the village.

The Sukhnag (Sokhanag) River, known locally as the spring of solace, passes through Rathsun.

== Geography ==
The total geographical area of village is 4.44 square kilometres (1.71 sq mi). It is located at an elevation of 1,595 ft (486 m) above the sea level. The landscape, mostly the agricultural field area, is made up of plateau-like terraces known as karewas.

== Demographics ==
=== Population ===
As of 2011 census, the population of Rathsun is 5,907 of which 3,191 are males while the remaining 2,716 are females and a total number of 1488 children below 6 years as per the report. There are about 596 houses in Rathsun village.

Population (%)
Population
Males	54.02%
Females	45.98%
Distribution of Population

=== Religion ===
Religions
Religion
Islam	100%
Others	0%
Distribution of Population on Religion

Sects of Islam
Sects of Islam
Sunni	100%
Others	0%
Distribution of Sects on Religion

Baba Hanifudin Reshi(R.A)

== Transport ==
The nearest airport from Rathsun is Sheikh ul-Alam International Airport. The nearest railway station is the Mazhom railway station.

== See also ==
- Pethmakhama
- Aasar-i-Shareef Pethmakhama
- Beerwah, Jammu and Kashmir
- Aripanthan
- Chewdara
