= Sonapah =

Village In Jammu and Kashmir

Craft Tourism Village Sonapah Sonpah
- Village
- Nickname: Sonpah
- Location within Jammu and Kashmir Location within India
- Coordinates: 34°00′35″N 74°36′11″E
- Country: India
- Union territory: Jammu and Kashmir
- District: Budgam
- Tehsil: Beerwah

Government
  - Type: Panchayat

Area
  - Total: 3,000 km^{2} (1,200 sq mi)
  - Rank: 5

Population (2011)
  - Total: 4,900
  - Rank: 3
  - Density: 1.6/km^{2} (4.2/sq mi)

Languages
  - Official: Kashmiri, Urdu, Hindi, Dogri, English
- Time zone: UTC+5:30 (IST)
- PIN: 193401
- Vehicle registration: JK04
- Sex Ratio: 1700♀/2300 ♂900[children's]

Craft Tourism Village Sonapah is a village in tehsil Beerwah, district Budgam of the Jammu and Kashmir (India).

== Population ==
As of the 2011 census, the population of Sonapah is 4900, of which 2300are males and 1700 are females. The total number of children below 6 years is 900 as per the report.

== Religions ==
Religions
Religion	percentage%
Islam	100%
Others	0%

== Transport ==
Beerwah to Budgam

Beerwah to Magam

Beerwah to Arizal

Beerwah to Khanshahib

Doodhpathri road

Tosmaidan road

arizal

== Craft Tourism Village Designation ==
In recognition of Sonapah’s deep-rooted tradition of Sozni embroidery, with over 400 practising artisans and more than 20 award-winning craftsmen, the Department of Handicrafts & Handloom, Kashmir initiated the process of designating the village as an official Craft Tourism Village, aiming to preserve this 150-year-old heritage and bolster rural craft tourism. The initiative is part of major infrastructure and promotional priorities under the Union Territory's artisanal support framework, which also encompasses Common Facility Centres, Craft Villages, and GI‑tagging campaigns, with Sonapah’s project proposed alongside others such as a Wool CFC at Nowshera.

Under the scheme, a proposed craft training and demonstration centre in Sonapah is expected to offer hands‑on Sozni embroidery courses for visitors and local youth, facilitate market access, and provide direct exposure to the craft’s techniques and practitioners. Officials anticipate that formal designation will enhance support mechanisms—including subsidies, exhibitions, packaging and logistics assistance, youth entrepreneurship initiatives, and digital authentication of GI-certified products—to promote sustainable livelihoods and tourism integration in Budgam district.

This government-led effort aims to transform Sonapah into a destination for craft tourism—known for its Sozni embroidery—while ensuring economic empowerment of artisans and intergenerational cultural continuity.

The village was officially declared a Craft Tourism Village at the end of June 2025. https://brighterkashmir.com/news/sonpah-craft-village-between-heritage-and-privation-76647.html

== Educational institutions ==
- Govt. MS School Sonapah.
- Govt. PS School Sonapah.
- Alpine Institute of Modern Education Sonapah (AIMES).
- Roots international school (ROOTS)
- Kids care school (KIDS)
