= Writers of the Guru Granth Sahib =

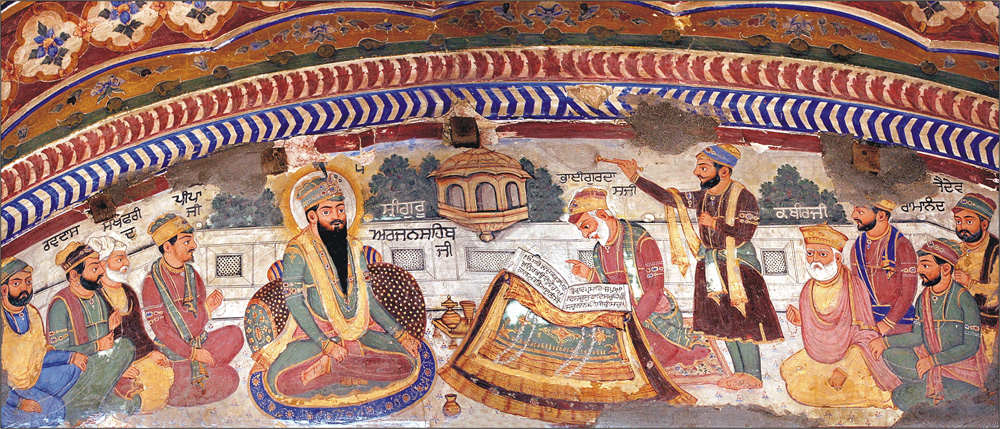
Contributors of the scripture depicted with Guru Arjan, while Bhai Gurdas scribes the Adi Granth. Fresco from Gurdwara Baba Atal, Amritsar

The Guru Granth Sahib (Punjabi: ਗੁਰੂ ਗ੍ਰੰਥ ਸਾਹਿਬ; [ɡʊɾuː ɡɾəntʰᵊ saːhɪbᵊ]), is the central religious text of Sikhism, considered by Sikhs to be the final sovereign Guru of the religion. It contains 1430 Angs (limbs, referring to pages of the scripture), containing 5,894 hymns of 36 saint mystics which includes Sikh gurus (6 gurus, possibly as many as 7 or 8), Bhagats (15 bhagats), Bhatts (11 bhatts) and Gursikhs (4 gursikhs). It is notable among foundational religious scriptures for including hymns from writers of other religions, namely Hindus and Muslims. The scripture also contains compositions by authors of varying caste-backgrounds, including Shudras and untouchables. It also contains teachings of the Sikh gurus themselves.

== Categorization of authors ==
Scholars categorize the authors of the Guru Granth Sahib into four groups:

1. Sikh Gurus
2. Bhagats
3. Bhatts
4. Gursikhs

=== Sikh gurus ===
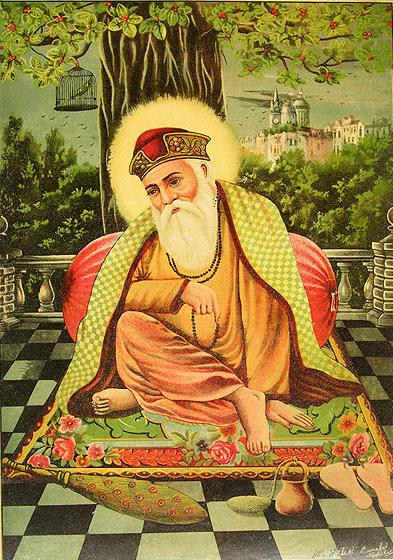
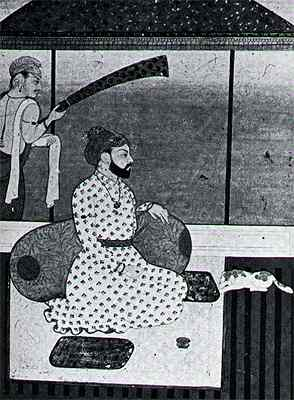
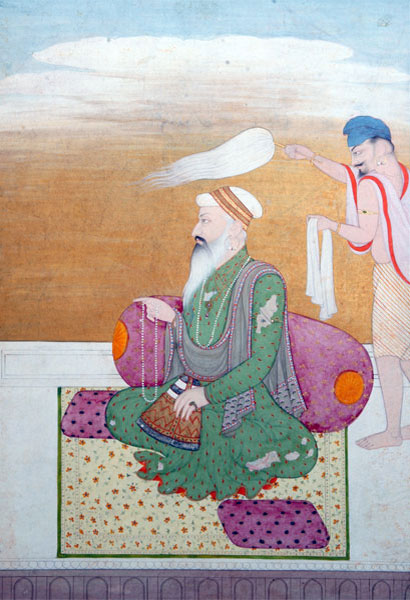
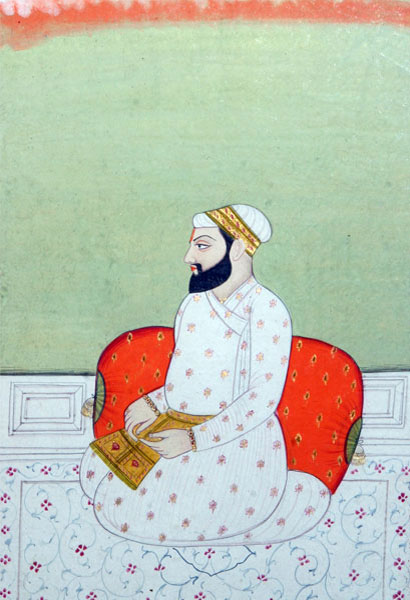
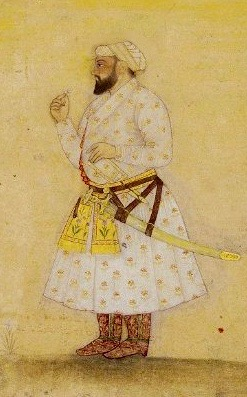

Philosophically, Sikhs are bound to believe in Shabad Guru — the words written in the Guru Granth Sahib — but the general belief is that the Sikh gurus established Sikhism over the centuries, beginning in the year 1469. The hymns of six Sikh Gurus are in the Guru Granth Sahib:

- Guru Nanak
- Guru Angad
- Guru Amar Das
- Guru Ram Das
- Guru Arjan
- Guru Tegh Bahadur

Whilst these six gurus are widely accepted as having their writings included in the Guru Granth Sahib, there are some who argue compositions of Guru Har Rai and Guru Gobind Singh are also included. A Salok Mahalla Satvan (7) and Dohra Mahalla Dasvan (10) have been attributed by some to the seventh and tenth gurus, respectively.

=== Bhagats ===
In the below list, the Bhagats (Punjabi: ਭਗਤ, from Sanskrit भक्त) were holy men of various sects whose teachings are included in the Guru Granth Sahib. Their bani (compositions) come under the title Bani Bhagtaan Ki. The word "Bhagat" means devotee, and comes from the Sanskrit word Bhakti, which means devotion and love. Bhagats evolved a belief in one God that preceded Kabir's selecting the writings of the great Hindu Bhaktis and Sufi saints. According to Surinder Singh Jodhka, Farid and Bhikan were Muslim Sufis.

The 15 Bhagat authors were:

- Bhagat Kabir
- Bhagat Ravidas
- Bhagat Farid
- Bhagat Ramanand
- Bhagat Beni
- Bhagat Namdev
- Bhagat Sadhana
- Bhagat Bhikhan
- Bhagat Parmanand
- Bhagat Sain
- Bhagat Dhanna
- Bhagat Pipa
- Bhagat Surdas
- Bhagat Jaidev
- Bhagat Trilochan

=== Bhatts ===
Many Hindu Saraswat Brahmins who started to follow the word of Guru Nanak were known as Bhatts, meaning bards. The 11 Bhatt authors were:

- Bhatt Kalshar
- Bhatt Balh
- Bhatt Bhalh
- Bhatt Bhika
- Bhatt Gayand
- Bhatt Harbans
- Bhatt Jalap
- Bhatt Kirat
- Bhatt Mathura
- Bhatt Nalh
- Bhatt Salh

=== Gursikhs ===
The four Gursikhs (devoted Sikhs) were:

- Bhai Sundar
- Bhai Mardana
- Bhai Satta Doom
- Bhai Balwand Rai

== Individuals and their contributions ==
Background Details and No. of Hymns
Name	Timeline	No. of Hymns
Gurus
Guru Nanak	15th Century	974
Guru Angad	16th Century	62
Guru Amar Das	16th Century	907
Guru Ram Das	16th Century	679
Guru Arjan	16th Century	2218
Guru Tegh Bahadur	17th Century	116
Bhagats
Bhagat Jaidev	13th Century	2
Bhagat Farid	13th Century	134 (Note: including 130 saloks, or short verses) (Note: Some of these may be by his successors, or by the Bhagat Farid of the 15th century, rather than Farid's own compositions.)
Bhagat Ramanand	14th Century	1
Bhagat Namdev	14th Century	62
Bhagat Trilochan	14th Century	5
Bhagat Parmanand	14th Century	1
Bhagat Dhanna	14th Century	4
Bhagat Bhikhan	14th Century	2
Bhagat Beni	14th Century	3
Bhagat Pipa	14th Century	1
Bhagat Sain	14th Century	1
Bhagat Surdas	14th Century	2
Bhagat Sadhana	14th Century	1
Bhagat Ravidas	15th Century	41
Bhagat Kabir	15th Century	541 (Note: 243 of Kabir's hymns are saloks, or short verses. One hymn formerly believed to as that of Kabir was later attributed by Guru Arjan to Namdev.)
Bhatts
Bhatt Kalshar	15th Century	54
Bhatt Balh	15th Century	5
Bhatt Bhalh	15th Century	1
Bhatt Bhika	15th Century	2
Bhatt Gayand	15th Century	13
Bhatt Harbans	15th Century	2
Bhatt Jalap	15th Century	5
Bhatt Kirat	15th Century	8
Bhatt Mathura	15th Century	14
Bhatt Nalh	15th Century	16
Bhatt Salh	15th Century	3
Gursikhs
Bhai Mardana	15th century	2
Baba Sundar	15th Century	6
Satta Doom	15th Century	1 var
Balvand Rai	15th Century	1 var

== Controversial authors ==
=== Farid ===
It is uncertain if the verses attributed to Farid in the Sikh scripture refers to Fariduddin Ganjshakar (1173–1266). According to Bhardwaj (2016), the language of the verses more closely resembles a later stage of Punjabi, leading credence to the theory that these verses were originally authored by the 11th successor of Farid's spiritual lineage named Ibrahim Farid (also known as Farid Sani, "Farid the Second"), who died in Sirhind in 1552 and had disciples spread across Punjab and Delhi. According to this alternative view, Guru Nanak lived during the period of this Farid and perhaps procured the verses which were originally authored by Ibrahim Farid during a meeting between the two. Another theory is that the verses found in the Guru Granth Sahib attributed to Farid are ultimately originally traceable to Fariduddin Ganjshakar but that successive generations of his spiritual lineage altered the language of the verses to keep them understandable to the common population owing to linguistic evolution and change across generations.

According to Hanif (2000), reviewing arguments made by previous scholars regarding the identity of the author of the Farid verses, the terminology of the verses, their language, idioms, expressions, utilised pen-names (with Ganjshakar employing the pen-name Masud rather than Farid), and apparent Vaishnavist, Vedantic, and Bhakti influences support them being authored by the later Farid rather than the original. As per Bhardwaj (2016), the verses linguistically match with a later period of Punjabi than that of Farid Ganjshakar, which support a later date of compilation around the time of Ibrahim Farid.

=== Mardana and Tall ===
Two more writers of the present recension of the Adi Granth are a matter of debate among scholars, namely Bhai Mardana and Bhatt Tall.

According to different scholars:

- Two hymns under the title Mardana 1 are said to be compositions of Bhai Mardana; however, others refute this claim, because the pen name Nanak is used inside the hymn, and because Mardana is a type of shalok.
- Similarly, there is a Swaiya (poetical metre) under the name of Bhatt Tall, which according to some scholars is a Gurmukhi copyist's error for Kal i.e. Bhatt Kalshar.

=== Sri Chand ===
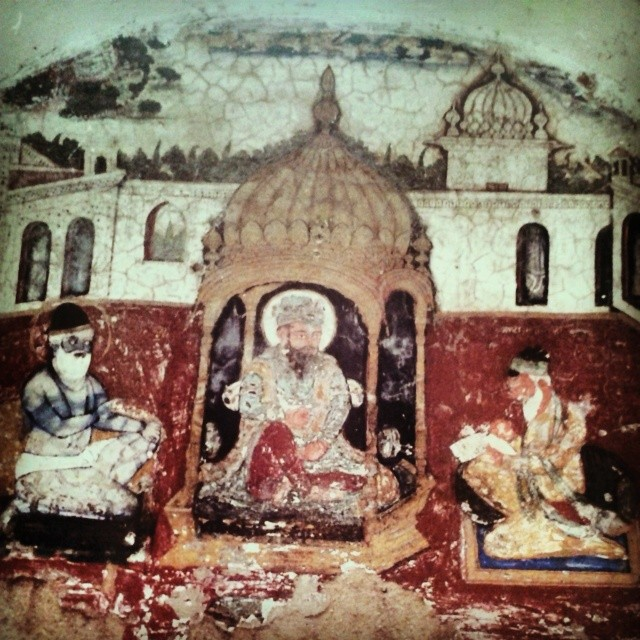
Mural from Gurdwara Ramsar Sahib of Sri Chand meeting Guru Arjan and Bhai Gurdas at Amritsar. Likely a depiction of the tale of him contributing a verse during the composition of the Sukhmani Sahib

According to a sakhi, when Guru Arjan had finished composing sixteen astpadis (cantos) of the Gauri Sukhmani composition, popularly known as Sukhmani Sahib, Sri Chand, the son of Guru Nanak, visited him. During this visit, it is said that Guru Arjan requested him to continue the composition he was compiling and complete the seventeenth canto of the Sukhmani Sahib. Sri Chand humbly recited the verse of his father following the Mul Mantar in the Japji Sahib. Thus, it became the seventeenth canto of the Sukhmani Sahib.

== Writers whom were rejected by the guru ==
Sikh tradition narrates that at-least four figures, namely Pilu, Kahna Bhagat, Chajju Bhagat, and Shah Husain, paid a visit to Guru Arjan in Amritsar when they learnt he was compiling the Ād Granth to suggest their compilations be included. Guru Arjan contemplated but ultimately decided to reject the idea of including their works in the Sikh scripture as they were not in-line with Sikh tenets as per the guru's analysis and judgement. Their works were rejected due to them having a pessimistic approach and promoting worldly renunciation/denunciation and escapism. As per Kavi Santokh Singh's Suraj Prakash, the version narrated only mentions Kahna, Pilu, and Shah Hussain. Pilu's verses were rejected for being misogynistic and promoting celibacy over the life of a householder, while Kahna's verses were philosophically correct but would lead to egotism in kaliyuga. Shah Hussain, seeing the other two rejected, instead wrote a verse about the virtues of remaining silent.

== See also ==
- Bhat Vahis
