= Bhattan De Savaiye =

Sikh scriptures

Bhattan de Savaiye ਭੱਟਾਂ ਦੇ ਸਵਈਏ
- by Sikh Bhatts
- Original title: Savaiye Mahalla 1 to Savaiye Mahalla 5
- First published in: Adi Granth, 1604
- Country: India
- Language: Gurmukhi
- Genre: Religion
- Meter: Savaiye
- Lines: 123 Savaiye
- Pages: 1389-1409
- Preceded by: Savaiye Sri Mukhbakya Mahalla 5(ਸਵਯੇ ਸ੍ਰੀ ਮੁਖਬਾਕ੍ਯ੍ਯ ਮਹਲਾ ੫)
- Followed by: Salok Vaaran Te Vadheek (ਸਲੋਕ ਵਾਰਾਂ ਤੇ ਵਧੀਕ)

Bhattan de Savaiye (Punjabi: ਭੱਟਾਂ ਦੇ ਸਵਈਏ; bhaṭāṁ dē sava'ī'ē), also known as Bhatt Bani (Gurmukhi: ਭੱਟ ਬਾਣੀ; bhaṭa bāṇī), is a name given to 123 Savaiyas composed by various Bhatts, which are present in Guru Granth Sahib, scripture of Sikhs. According to various scholars, these Savaiyas are eulogies of first five Gurus of Sikhism.

Generally, it is accepted that there were 11 Bhatts whose hymns are present in Adi Granth, but controversy still exist that there are 12 or 17. The Bhatt Bahis were authored by the descendants of these eleven hereditary Bhatts. As per Pashaura Singh, the Bhatts were of Brahmin origin.

== Compilation ==
According to Louis E. Fenech, many of the Sikh Bhatts during the period of the Sikh gurus were Brahmins but some of them were Muslim Mirasis. Guru Arjan's decision to include the Bhatt Bani in his compilation of the Ād Granth was a reflection of influence of Mughal courtly culture.

== Structure ==
The savaiye starts from page 1389 from Savaiye Mahalla Pehla Ke and ends at page 1409 of Guru Granth Sahib. The savaiyas are under five titles:

1. Savaiya Mahalla Pehle Ke 1 (Punjabi: ਸਵਈਏ ਮਹਲੇ ਪਹਿਲੇ ਕੇ ੧)
2. Savaiye Mahalle Duje Ke 2 (Punjabi: ਸਵਈਏ ਮਹਲੇ ਦੂਜੇ ਕੇ ੨)
3. Savaiye Mahalle Teeje Ke 3 (Punjabi: ਸਵਈਏ ਮਹਲੇ ਤੀਜੇ ਕੇ ੩)
4. Savaiye Mahalle Chauthe Ke 4 (Punjabi: ਸਵਈਏ ਮਹਲੇ ਚਉਥੇ ਕੇ ੪)
5. Savaiye Mahalle Panjve Ke 5 (Punjabi: ਸਵਈਏ ਮਹਲੇ ਪੰਜਵੇ ਕੇ ੫)

Following is list of Bhatts and their number of savaiyas composed by them:

No. of Saviyas by each Bhatts
Name	Mahalla Pehla	Mahalla 2	Mahalla 3	Mahalla 4	Mahalla 5	Total
Bhatt Kalshar	10	10	9	13	12	54
Bhatt Balh	-	-	-	5	-	5
Bhatt Bhalh	-	-	1	-	-	1
Bhatt Bhika	-	-	2	-	-	2
Bhatt Gayand	-	-	-	13	-	13
Bhatt Harbans	-	-	-	-	2	2
Bhatt Jalap	-	-	5	-	-	5
Bhatt Kirat	-	-	4	4	-	8
Bhatt Mathura	-	-	-	7	7	14
Bhatt Nalh	-	-	-	16	-	16
Bhatt Salh	-	-	1	2	-	3

== Author controversy ==
1. Tall or Kal: A Swaiya in name of Bhatt Tall, which according to some scholars is a Gurmukhi typo as it is Kal i.e Bhatt Kalshar.
2. No. of Bhatts: Few author believe there are 17 Bhatts including above. Others are Bhatt Sevak, Bhatt Jalh, Bhatt Jalan.

== See also ==
- Bhatra Sikhs
- Bhat Vahis
- Bhagat Bani
- Brahmin Sikhs
