= Brahmin Sikhs =

Sikh subgroup

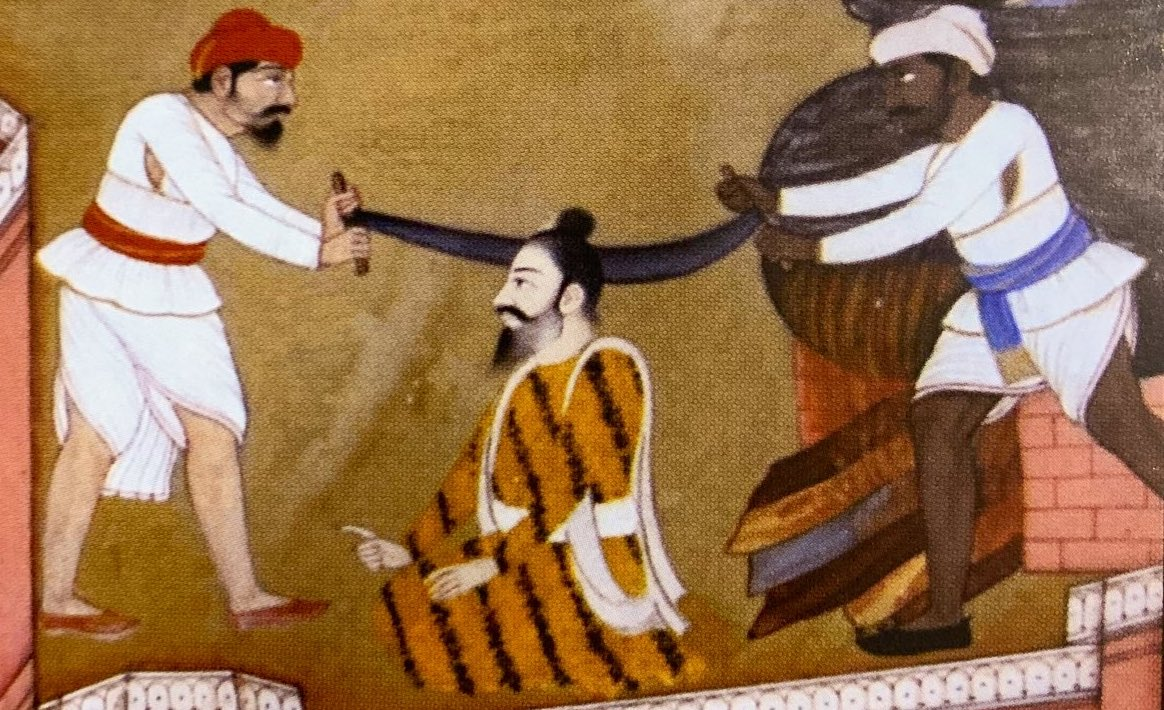
- Brahmin martyr Bhai Mati Das being executed by being sawed in half while alive, detail of a work by the court painter Basahatullah, circa 19th century.

Regions with significant populations
- India, United Kingdom

Languages
- Punjabi, Pahari-Pothwari, Kashmiri, Hindi

Religion
- Sikhism

Related ethnic groups
- Brahmins, Saraswat Brahmins, Mohyal Brahmins

Brahmin Sikh is a Sikh religious group/clans, whose members had ancestry belonging to the Brahmin community. They primarily hail from Punjab, erstwhile Poonch Jagir (Poonchi Sikhs), Mirpur, Hazara and other parts of Pothohar region, but some are also called Kashmiri Sikhs, who are of Kashmiri origin.

== History ==
Brahmins from Punjab started to follow Sikhism since the birth of Guru Nanak. They mostly come from Saraswat, a sub sect of Brahmins, also called Sarsut in Punjabi and a some from Gaur Brahmin community.

== Population and distribution ==
Brahmin Sikhs primarily reside in India, with a diaspora also present in the United Kingdom. The majority of Brahmin Sikhs originate from Punjab, erstwhile Poonch Jagir, Mirpur etc. In Punjab they specifically come from regions such as Patiala, Hoshiarpur, Gurdaspur, Bathinda, and Nawanshahar. They also hail from Chandigarh, as well as in Haryana. Additionally, a significant number have migrated and settled in Delhi, mostly migrating during the turmoil of 1947, especially those from the erstwhile Poonch Jagir, Mirpur, Hazara etc. Some Brahmin Sikhs can trace their lineage to areas like Sialkot, Lahore and parts of Jammu and Kashmir.

== Contribution and influence on Sikhism ==
Brahmins made exceptional contributions during the period of Sikh Gurus, demonstrating their remarkable abilities and skills. Their invaluable contributions played a crucial role in shaping the Sikh community and its culture. The writings of 35 authors are included in Guru Granth Sahib, and among them were 16 Brahmins whose contribution amounted to 45 percent. The Bhatt Brahmins, who sang and wrote in praise of the Sikh Gurus, made significant sacrifices for the cause of Sikhism, with 11 laying down their lives during the lifetime of the Gurus. In recognition of their devotion, the Gurus conferred upon them the prestigious title of preacher (Manjis). There writings known as Bhattan De Savaiye i.e. 'Hymn of Bhatts'.

== List of notable Brahmin Sikhs ==
=== Bhats ===
No. of Saviyas by each Bhatts and their name
Name	Mahalla Pehla	Mahalla 2	Mahalla 3	Mahalla 4	Mahalla 5	Total
Bhatt Tal	10	10	9	13	12	54
Bhatt Balh	-	-	-	5	-	5
Bhatt Bhalh	-	-	1	-	-	1
Bhatt Bhika	-	-	2	-	-	2
Bhatt Gayand	-	-	-	13	-	13
Bhatt Harbans	-	-	-	-	2	2
Bhatt Jalap	-	-	5	-	-	5
Bhatt Kirat	-	-	4	4	-	8
Bhatt Mathura	-	-	-	7	7	14
Bhatt Nalh	-	-	-	16	-	16
Bhatt Salh	-	-	1	2	-	3

=== Military, saints, and scholars ===
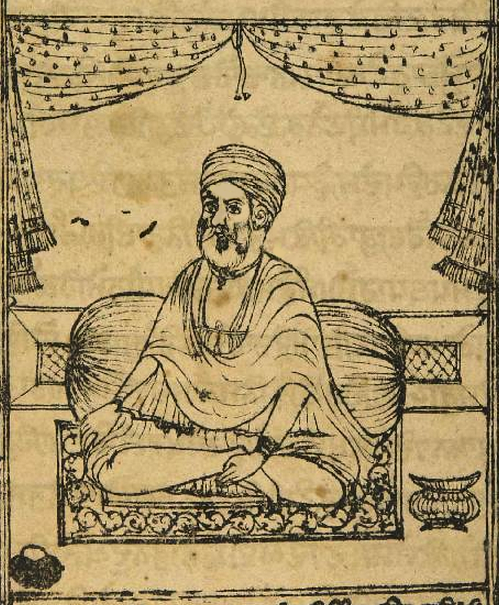
Pandit Tara Singh's (1822–1891) image found on the cover of "Updesh Shatak Basha"

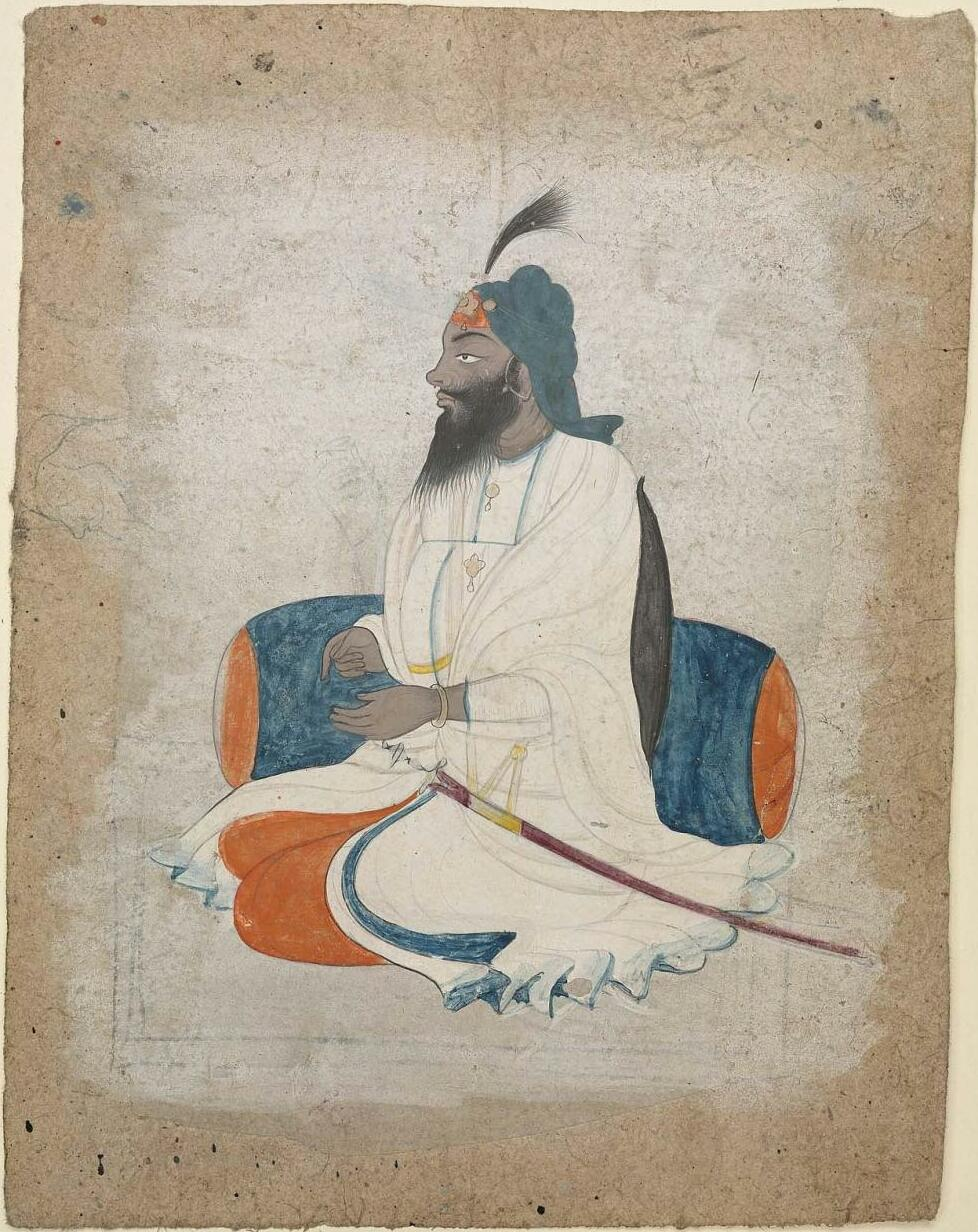
Portrait of Jamadar Khushal Singh

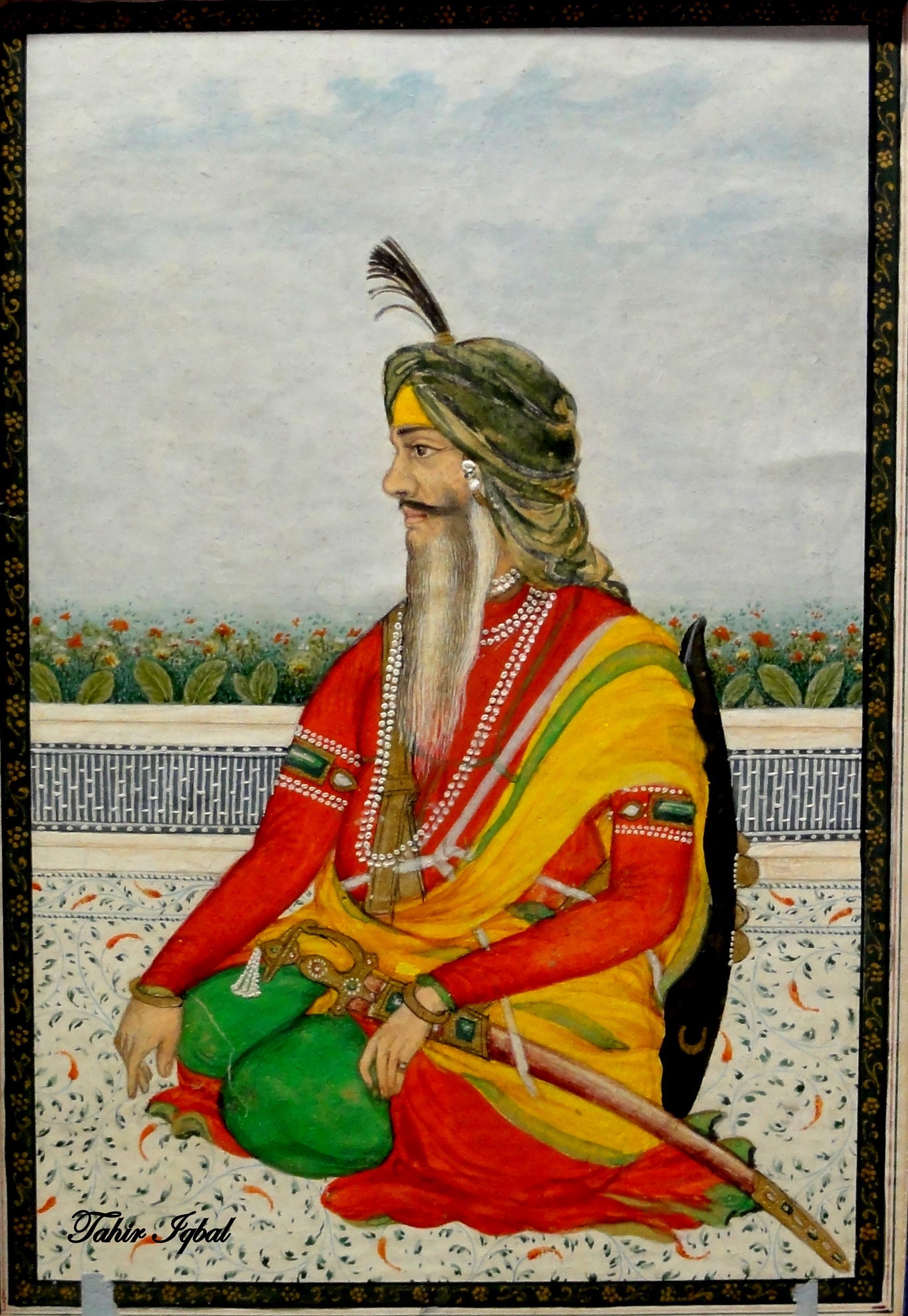
Painting of a seated Raja Teja Singh with a sword on his lap and shield on his back

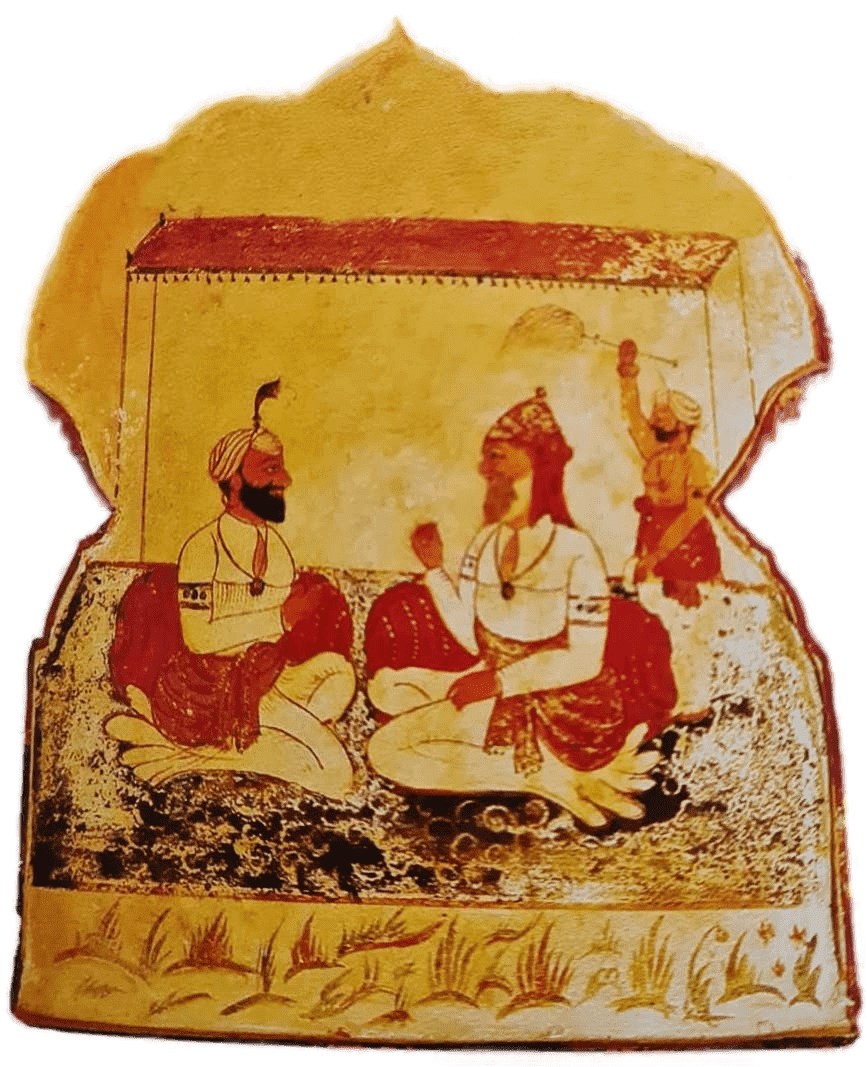
Mural fresco of Banda Bairagi (seated right) with his son, Ranjit Singh (seated left)

- Pandit Tara Singh Narotam – Most well-known Nirmala sadhu, scholar who discover Hemkunt Sahib and writer of Gurmat Nirnay Sagar, Sri Gur Tirath Sangrah and Guru Girarath Kosh
- Raja Khushal Singh Jamadar – General and Jamadar/Wazir (till 1818) of Maharaja Ranjit Singh's court and Uncle of Raja Teja Singh
- Raja Teja Singh – commander in the Sikh Empire
- Banda Bairagi – Military commander who fought against the Mughal Empire in the early 18th century. He played a significant role in establishing Sikh rule in Punjab.
- Mahan Singh Mirpuri Bali – one of the prominent generals of Maharaja Ranjit Singh.
- Raja Lal Singh – Wazir of the Sikh Empire and commander of Sikh Khalsa Army
- Bhai Kirpa Singh – Teacher of Guru Gobind Singh and one of the martyrs of Battle of Chamkaur with his brother Sanmukh Singh.
- Bhai Lal Singh Panjokhara - was one of the martyrs of Battle of Chamkaur and heroic participater of Battle of Bhangani
- Bhai Balu Hasna (1564–1660) – was a Udasi saint, who was disciple of Baba Gurditta (Successor of Baba Sri Chand), and later became head of a dhuari (or branch) of the Udasi Sampradaya
- Bhai Almast (1553–1643) – was a Udasi saint and head of a dhuari (or branch) of the Udasi Sampradaya, was born in a Kashmiri Gaur Brahman family to Bhai Hardatt and Mai Prabha, and was the elder brother of Bhai Balu Hasna, another equally prominent preacher of the Sampradaya.
- Bhai Sant Rein - was an 18th-century (1741-1871 AD) Udasi saint and scholar, who wrote Guru Nanak Vijay, Man Prabodh, Anbhai Amrit, Sri Guru Nanak Bodh and Udasi Bodh
- Bhai Singha Purohit – was Kul-Purohit and General of Guru Hargobind, 6th Sikh Guru who rescued Guru's young daughter from Mughal's clutches and killed Mughal commander Mohammed Ali before attaining martyrdom in battle against Mughals in Amritsar.
- Akali Kaur Singh Nihang - Kaur Singh (formerly known as Puran Singh) was a religious Preacher and scholar who wrote Guru Shabad Ratan Prakash and other books.
- Baba Praga Das – Baba Praga was a Brahmin of Chhibber clan belonging to the village of Karyala. He was a notable figure in Sikh history, and participated in many battles. Chowk Paraga Das of Amritsar is named after him. His loyalty and spiritual devotion to different Gurus particularly Guru Arjan Dev finds a mention in the book Suraj Prakash.
- Dwarka Das – He was the son of Baba Praga, was Dewan to Guru Har Gobind and successive Gurus until Guru Har Rai.
- Bhai Lakhiya – Also known as Bhai Lakhi Das, he was the son of Dwarka Das. He was appointed Dewan after the death of his father, but did not live long after that himself. He was the first Chhibber of Karyala to be bestowed the title of "Bhai" by a Guru.
- Bhai Dargah Mal – Was the Dewan after Bhai Lakhiya, up to the reign of Guru Har Kishen.
- Bhai Mati Das – He was a descendant of the same family as Baba Praga and was a disciple of Guru Tegh Bahadur. He preferred a barbaric death instead of a forced conversion to Islam. Bhai Mati Das was sawed in half on 9 November 1675 under the orders of Aurangzeb for his refusal to convert, and his only last wish was that he be allowed to face his Guru while the execution was being carried out.
- Bhai Sati Das – He was the younger brother of Bhai Mati Das, and a scholar of Persian who translated hymns of Guru Tegh Bahadur for the understanding of some of his Muslim followers. He too was executed in a barbaric fashion on 10 November 1675 by being subjected to cuts and later burned alive, for his refusal to convert to Islam.
- Bhai Chaupa Singh Chhibber – He was a descendant of the same family as Bhai Mati Das, and was tutor and care-taker of Guru Govind Singh.
- Bhai Sahib Singh – He was a nephew of Bhai Mati Das, was appointed Dewan by Guru Govind Singh.
- Bhai Gurbakhsh Singh – He was a son of Bhai Sahib Singh. Bhai Gurbakhsh Singh died defending the Harmandir Sahib during a raid by Ahmad Shah Durrani.
- Bhai Kesar Singh Chhibber – Bhai Kesar Singh Chhibber was author of 'Bansavalinama Dasan Patshahian Da'. He was the son of Bhai Gurbakhsh Singh.

== Presence at the Lahore Darbar ==
Of the 152 Hindu courtiers and officials in Lahore Darbar, 56 of them were Brahmins, amounting to 37%.

== See also ==
- Sikhism
- Bhatra Sikhs
- Sikhs in Jammu and Kashmir
