= Hindu genealogy registers at Haridwar =

Genealogy registers

Hindu genealogy records of Haridwar
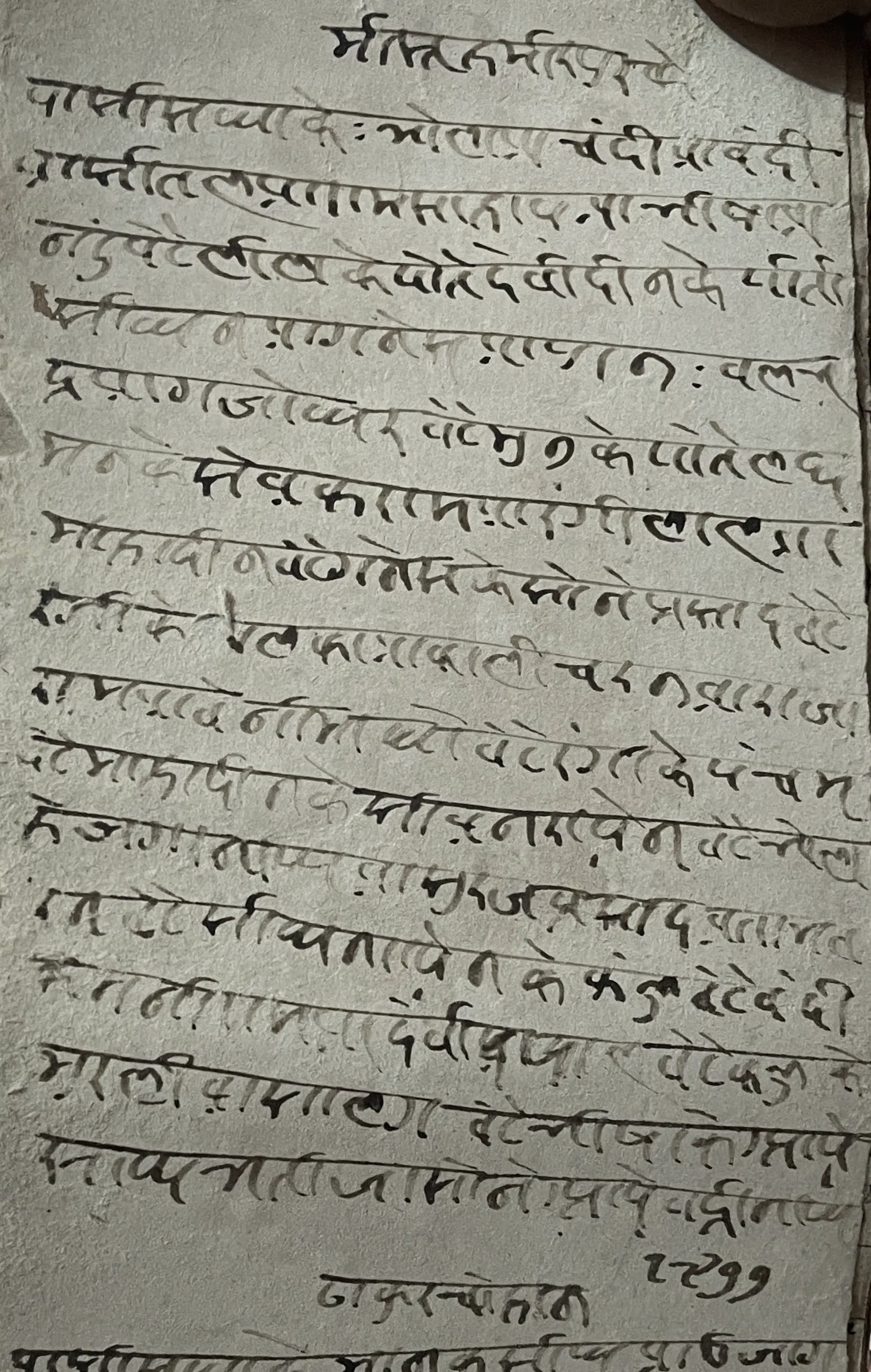
- Folio of a genealogical register (Bahi-Khata) of Haridwar for a local village near Kanpur
- Founded: 1194 (per the Genealogical Society of Utah); 1770s (as per James Lochtefeld)
- Founder: Pandas
- Distributor: Teerth Purohit Pandas
- Genre: Bahi genealogical registers
- Country of origin: India
- Location: Haridwar, Uttarakhand, India
- Medium: Pothis or Bahis

In certain Hindu pilgrimage centers in India, genealogy registers are maintained by Brahmin priests known as pandas. Pandas are genealogists at Haridwar in Uttarakhand, India. In several cases, these records known as vahis (or bahi), also known as pothis, have been used in settling legal cases regarding inheritance or property disputes. Most of these records have traced family histories for more than twenty generations. The records were created when family members of deceased people dispersed their ashes in the Ganges or visited Haridwar for a religious dip in the river. During these visits, the family priest records births, marriages, and deaths on paper scrolls. Another term for the bahi registers is bahi-khatta.

The records of a particular family contain information on place of origin, names, births, deaths, cause of death, place of residence, caste, and clan. Details about property and land-holdings are also recorded. Beyond genealogy, the records also document famines, epidemics, migration, the socio-historical details on how clans and communities were organized, and the wealth of a given community at a certain period of time (inferred from details about their donations and grants to local temples and villages).

In order to consult the records, a visiting individual must have knowledge of their family's name, place of origin, and the date of a recent visit. The pandas (using a system of indexing known only to them) will then consult the relevant record. The records also contain genealogical information of families from places now located in Pakistan (such as Sindh). Individuals consult the records for a variety of reasons: practical, religious or sentimental in nature.

== History ==
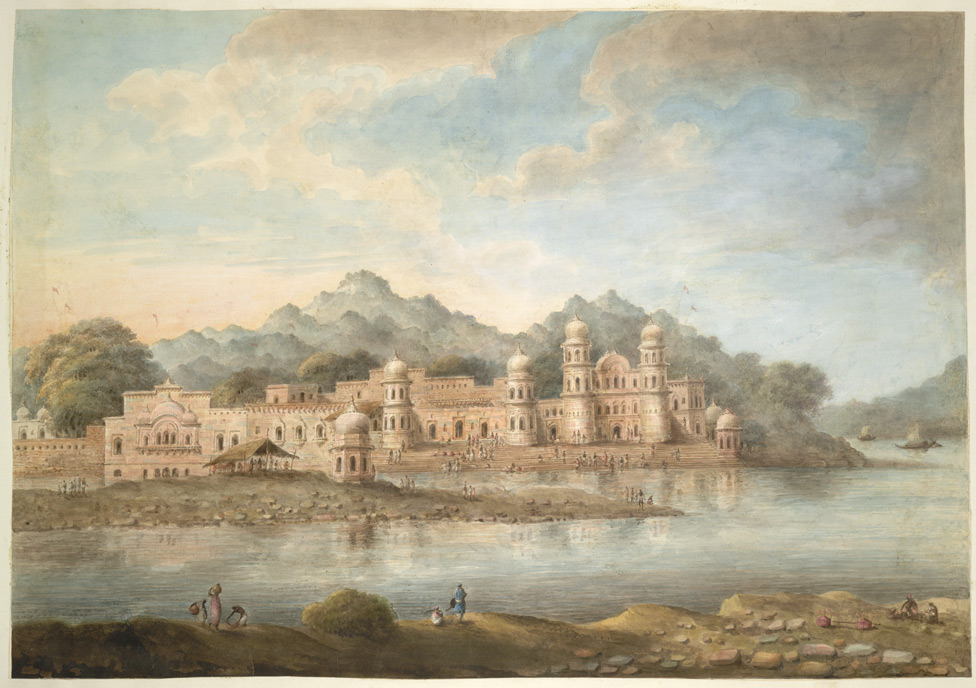
The ghats at Haridwar, watercolour of the ghats at Haridwar from 'Views by Seeta Ram from Mohumdy to Gheen Vol. V' produced for Lord Moira, afterwards the Marquess of Hastings, by Sita Ram between 1814-15

In Hinduism, Haridwar is a revered site, principally because the Ganges River leaves the Himalayas to enter the Gangetic plain at this point. The region of the Himalayas is also named the Devabhūmi (“Land of the Gods”), and Haridwar is where the Ganges descends to the Earth. The earliest written record from the 7th century described it as a place of religious pilgrimage:

Not far from the town, and standing by the Ganges river, is a great Deva temple, where very many miracles of divers [sic] sorts are wrought. In the midst of it is a tank…[through which]…the Ganges river is led by an artificial canal. The men of the five Indies call it “the gate of the Ganga river.” This is where religious merit is found and sin effaced. There are always hundreds and thousands of people gathered together here from distant quarters to bathe and wash in its waters. Benevolent kings have founded here a “house of merit”…endowed with funds for providing choice food and medicines to bestow in charity...

— Xuanzang, Si-Yu-Ki, 4.197–198; trans. Beal, 1969

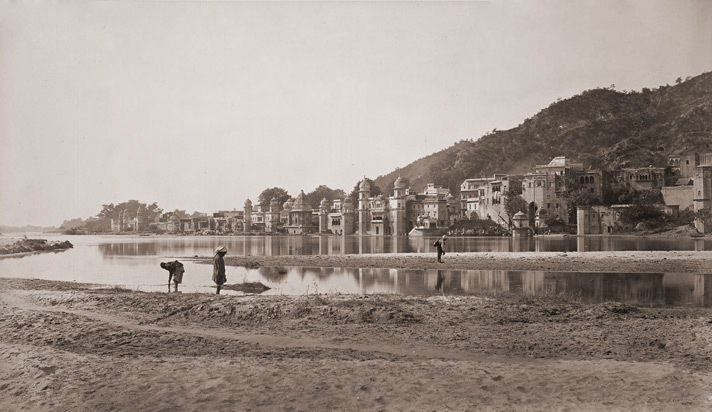
Haridwar, a site for Hindu pilgrimage, 1866 photograph.

Mughal-era records, such as the Āʾīn-i Akbarī and Khulāṣat al-Tawārikh of 1695, also describe Haridwar as a place of pilgrimage, especially during the festival of Vaisakhi. The Khulasat-ut-Tawarikh stated that Haridwar was a place for bathing, almsgiving, funerary rites; two religious occasions held importance there: vaiśākhī and the kumbhamelā. A European account written by Thomas Coryat from 1617 also describes the site as one of pilgrimage. According to James Lochtefeld, the gosāīṃs (also known as nāgā saṃnyāsīs) were the earliest inhabitants of Haridwar. In 1808, Haridwar was a small settlement, as per a contemporary source by Felix Raper. The establishment of the Upper Ganga Canal and the Oudh and Rohilkhand Railroad led to the development of Haridwar into a more expansive habitation.

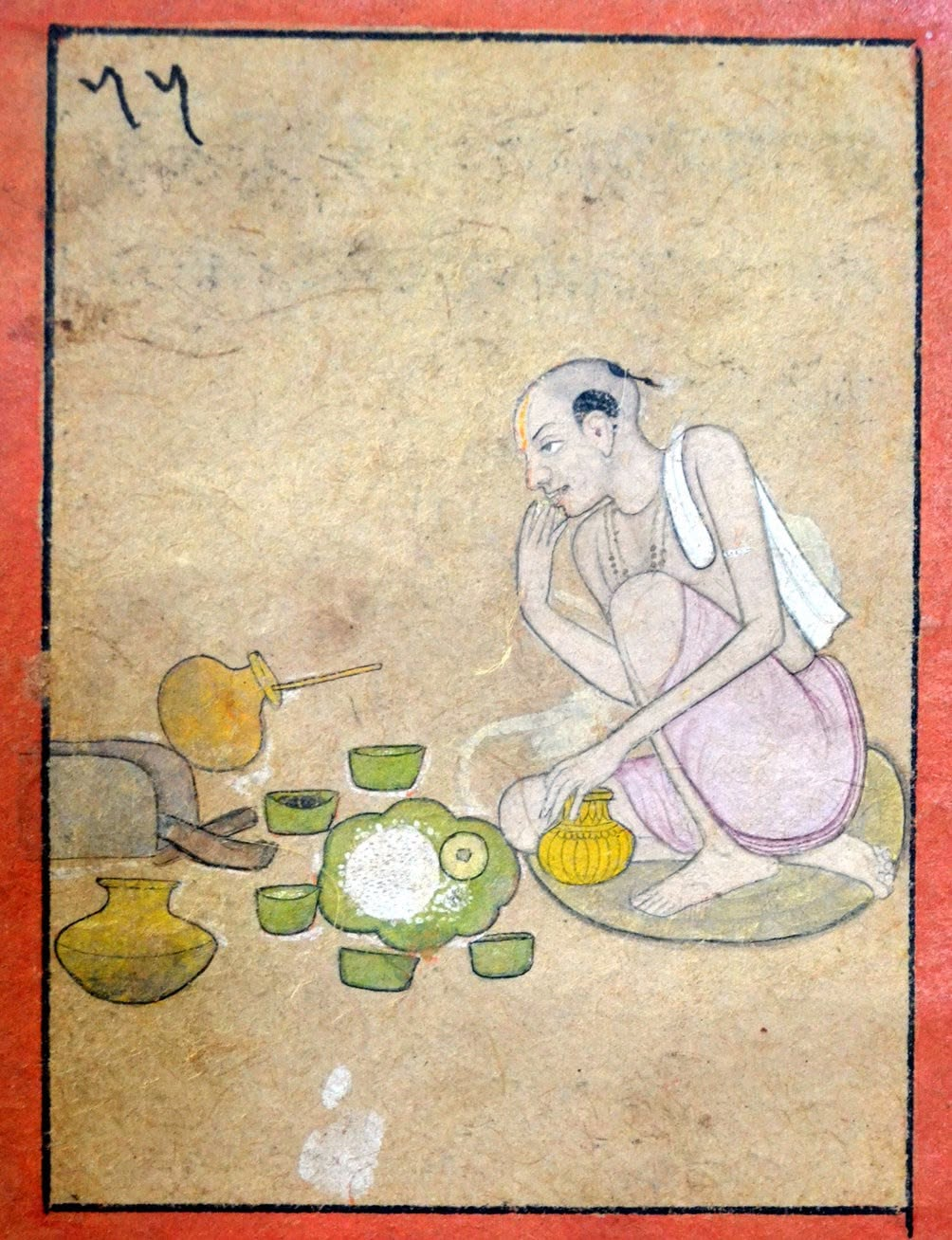
Painting of a Brahmin having feast of the shraddha, illustration to the Swapan-Darpan manuscript (book of dreams), Guler school, ca.1800

As Haridwar has traditionally been a site for death rites and also Sraddha amongst Hindus, it also became customary for the family pandits to record each visit of the family, along with their gotra, family tree, marriages, and present members who are grouped according to family and hometown. The pandas of Haridwar are some of the original inhabitants of the site. The familial details used to be passed down orally (by pandas memorizing the familial details of their clients) to the next generation until they were finally transcribed through the use of writing on a physical medium, initially on bhojpatra and then later on bahi paper. The earliest written records in the form of bhojpatra have mostly not survived. It is believed that the tradition of recording the details on bahi paper started with the invention of paper.

Over the centuries these registers became an important genealogical source for several families, especially after the Partition of India in 1947, and later amongst the Indian diaspora. In the 1960s, Indian art historian B. N. Goswamy was able to connect the signatures of artists on 18th century paintings to the names recorded in the Haridwar records to uncover the history of the Seu-Nainsukh-Manaku familial atelier. Since the 1990s, the documents have been allowed to be used in Indian court cases to solve property-disputes.

The family information of famous personalities, such as Shivaji, Maharana Pratap of Mewar, Raja Man Singh of Amber, Guru Har Rai, Hari Singh Nalwa of the Sikh Empire, Motilal Nehru, Mahatma Gandhi, and Indira Gandhi, are preserved in the Haridwar records.

=== Dating the records ===
The records may stretch back 15–20 generations into the past, being maintained by generations of pandas since then. As per the Genealogical Society of Utah, the earliest genealogical records of Haridwar date to 1194. A record from the year 1264 was uncovered at Aniruddha in Jawalapur, around 8 km from Haridwar. However, according to Irfan Habib, the records only stretch back four centuries. Prakash Mishra (president of the Akhil Bhartiya Tirth Purohit Mahasabha) claims the oldest bahi collection is 700-years-old.

James Lochtefeld examined the microfilmed records of the Haridwar bahi registers held by the Genealogical Society of Utah and could not find a record dated older than the 1770s, which is in contrast to the popular narrative, that the pandas have been serving clientele at Haridwar and recording their genealogies for thousands of years. As per Lochtefeld, records dating earlier than 1800 were extremely rare, with the records becoming more consistent from 1800 onwards, which he attributes to the British control of upper India bringing regional stability. Lochtefeld discovered that the oldest records for pilgrims from particular regions of India at Haridwar were for pilgrims from Uttar Pradesh, Haryana, Punjab, and Rajasthan, as the inhabitants of those areas have had a longer and stronger connection to Haridwar, due to the northwest trade route, and inhabitants of Punjab and Rajasthan have been going to Haridwar for funeral rites for a long time. Records for pilgrims from Eastern India to Haridwar (such as Bihar and Bengal) only begin appearing in the 1840s. Lochtefeld attributes this to the fact that Gaya instead had long been a place of funerary pilgrimage for people of these regions and Haridwar was difficult to travel to for them, especially prior to the railways. Pilgrimage was originally confined to elite social groups, thus the earliest records at Haridwar cover pilgrims who were Brahmins and land-owners (zamindars). Brahmins were motivated by religious-concerns, such as having their rituals attested whilst the visits by land-owners and royalty were recorded by pandas to enforce future patronage, which was a strong motivating factor on behalf of the pandas to record the details. Other castes and classes later began going on religious pilgrimages, such as to Haridwar, in order to emulate the upper castes and classes in their aspirations for upward social mobility. Thus, Lochtefeld claims the panda-jajman dynamic in Haridwar only began in the late 18th century.

Further evidence cited by Lochtefeld is that the sanyasis were the original inhabitants of Haridwar, rather than the pandas. The lineages of the pandas of Haridwar mostly trace to nearby villages, but some are quite distant, which means the pandas were likely motivated to settle in Haridwar and leave their original places of habitation. Lochtefeld claims that the motivation for this was the development of a bustling north-west India trade in the late 1700s that motivated Brahmins in the general region to migrate and settle in Haridwar to take advantage of it, becoming the pandas of Haridwar. However, Lochtefeld only examined the microfilmed records of Haridwar, held by the Genealogical Society of Utah, which comprises around only 10% of the total records of the site. Yet, Christopher A. Bayly found that the earliest, extant pilgrim record from the Varanasi pilgrimage trade was a copper-plate inscription from 1658 and the earliest extant bahi ledger book was from 1665. It would be unlikely that Haridwar's pilgrimage trade would date earlier than Varanasi's, thus agreeing with Lochtefeld's assertion that the beginning of the genealogical record tradition of Haridwar dates to the late-18th century.

== Description ==
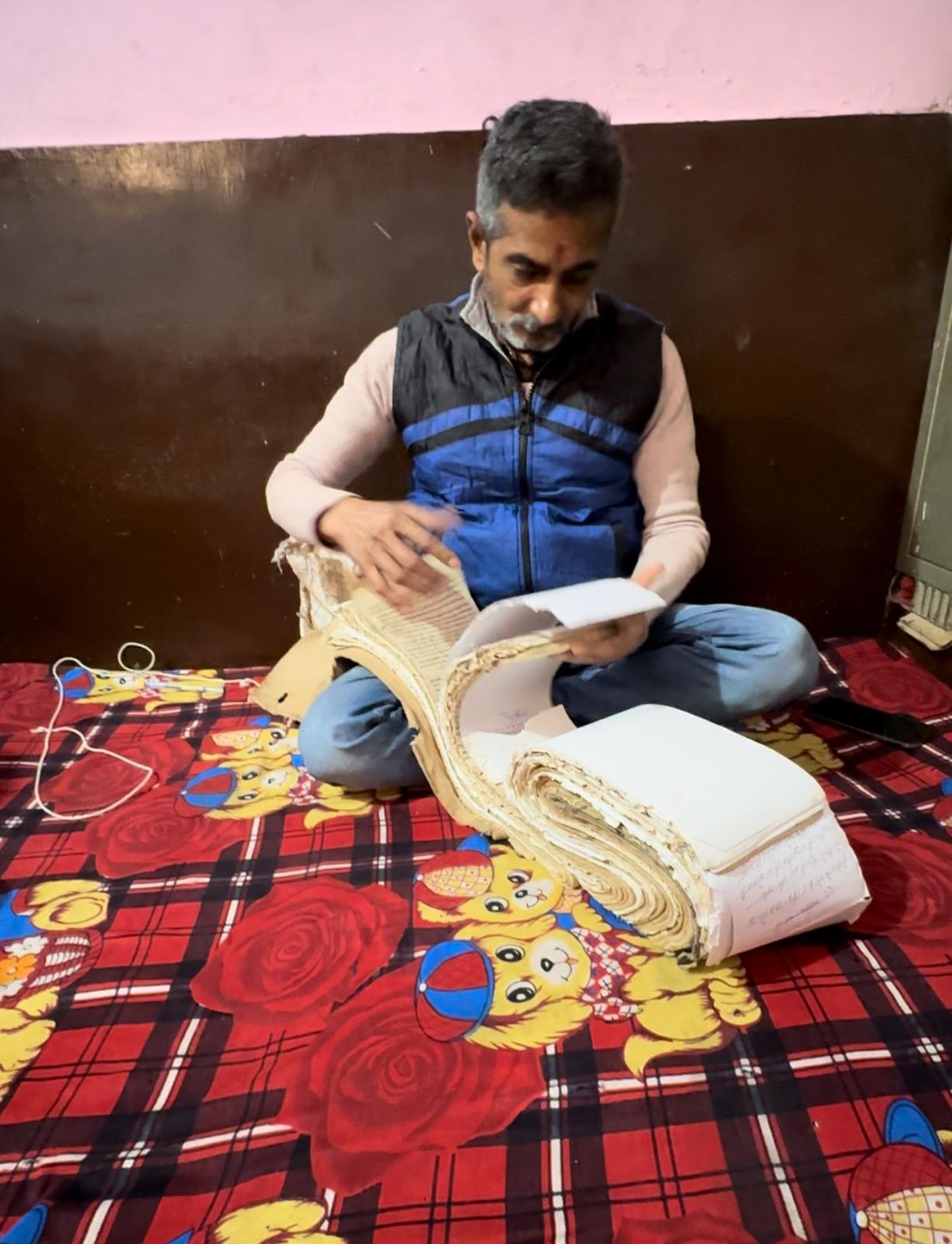
Priest searching for a family's ancestry record in a register

In Hinduism, it is believed that family is eternal and comprehensive and that humans must seek out their ancestors and perform annual ceremonies for their journey to moksha. There are notable places where Shraadhs are performed for the Pitrs. At these sites, it became customary for the family pandits (priests) to record each visit of the family, along with their gotra, family-tree, marriages, and members present, grouped according to family and hometown. Over the centuries, these registers became an important genealogical source for many families; important for splintered families when tracing their family tree and family history. Haridwar is not the only place of pilgrimage in the Indian subcontinent which maintains genealogical registers in this manner, there are also other places, such as Varanasi, Ujjain, Nasik, Gaya, Gangotri, Rameshwaram, Pehowa, Trimbakeshwar, Chintpurni, Kurukshetra, Jawalapur, and Jawalamukhi. South Indian families mostly visited Rameshwaram and Varanasi to record their family details. However, Haridwar remains the most comprehensive and well-preserved repository of Hindu genealogical records. The sacred sites of India, where pandas record genealogical information, are mostly concentrated in the greater Gangetic plain.

The genealogical records were created and updated whenever a family member died. Since Haridwar was a place of religious pilgrimage after the death of a family member, a tradition arose where the visiting pilgrims would consult a family priest and register the death and other events within the family. Within the records, families are arranged by caste and native place of habitation. The records detail the names and dates-of-death of the individuals and also note the date the record of a particular family was last updated. Furthermore, the kind of offering given to the priest by the family and the type of ceremony performed was recorded. The records were recorded in patrilineal sequence. Women were not directly mentioned in the records unless their deaths were hinted at indirectly. Married daughters were assumed to figure into the familial bahi of the family of the man they married, thus were no longer recorded in their birth family's record after marriage. However, in modern times when records are updated or created, the details of women of the family are included. In the case of a new branch of the family arising or the page of the record running out of space, the register scroll is unbound and a new sheet of paper is inserted. Thus, within the register there are papers from different periods of time inserted at various intervals.

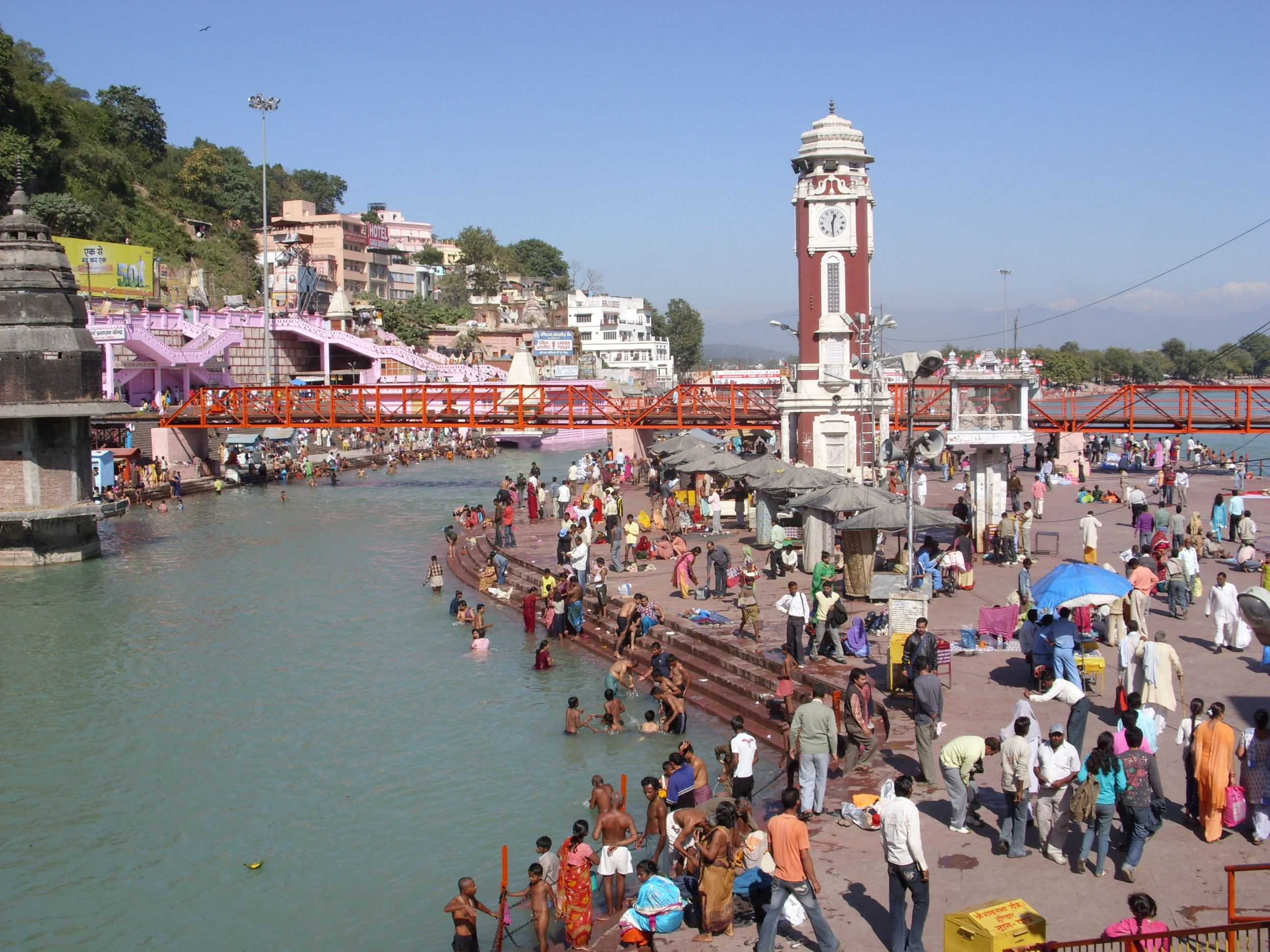
The ghats at Haridwar on the bank of the Ganges

In India, there are two broad types of traditional genealogists: those who work in places where the Ganges river flows and those who work in other locations. Haridwar is situated on the bank of the Ganges river. The pandas of Haridwar can often be found at the Har Ki Pauri. Another term for the pandas is teerth purohits. Paṇḍās who want to set-up a kiosk at Har Ki Pauri must rent space from the town, and Har ki Pauri's temples are mostly owned by the akhāṛās. The pandas of Haridwar position themselves as the site's "local pundits". However, some of the pandas of Haridwar originate from villages located more than 50 kilometres away from Haridwar. Meanwhile, the clients of pandas (the visitors or pilgrims) are known as yajmāns. Theoretically, each panda has exclusive rights to service clientele from a particular ancestral area of the Indian subcontinent.

In many Indian families, one member of every generation (usually in their elderly years after retirement) makes a once-in-a-lifetime trip to Haridwar to update their family's genealogical record. Once in Haridwar, they are approached by information brokers, who assist them with reconnecting with their ancestral, familial priest. The information brokers have a mental index of metadata relating to states, regions, and villages and their respective pandas who serve particular areas. After the panda has been found and details relating to caste, clan, and ancestral villages confirmed, the panda will retrieve the relevant vahi record from a steel vault.

In modern times, some families have become estranged from, or lost connection, with their ancestral family-priest, thus there are members stationed on the twelve ghats to assist pilgrims with finding their familial panda. To do so, the inquiring individual must know what ancestral habitation their ancestors originally inhabited. Due to a lack of computerized records or a local registry, the search for the correct priest of a particular individual family could take weeks. The family priests of Haridwar have arranged themselves into so-called "firms", which are based upon particular Indian subcontinental states, districts, and villages that they service. There are around 2,500 pandas still in-service at Haridwar, whilst others estimate there are only around 300. Another estimate states that there are 45,000 pandas operating out of their homes in Haridwar. Yet another figure is 2,000. After an individual locates their particular panda they can consult them, state their individual position and status within the family, and also have the option of updating the record with unrecorded and recent births, marriages, and deaths within the family, which can assist future generations seeking out the information. However, visitors are not allowed to modify existing records in order to maintain their authenticity. After the panda updates the record, the individual is asked by the panda to sign it Signatures on the records can be in the form of a thumb-print or a handwritten signature. Sweets are given to the visitor to bring back home for the family and a mandatory donation is deposited in a plate that is brought out.

Furthermore, diasporic Indians have also utilized the records to find out information on their family history. The records are also utilized in court cases in India, especially regarding family and property disputes. However, the panda must stay neutral, as they are viewed as the patron of both sides of the family.

The availability of records depends upon the varna-status of the family. Records for families of Brahmin, Kshatriya, and Vaishya origin go back to earlier periods, however the records of scheduled-caste families only go back around 150 years. This is due to the upper castes not allowing scheduled-caste persons from leaving their villages to go on pilgrimages, they were also limited in their travelling potential by poverty. For example, only in the last 100–150 years have people from the Meghwals and Regars castes started being able to travel to Haridwar to record their family details.

== Records for non-Hindus ==
Usually once a family converted out of Hinduism to another religion, the family's ancestral record at Haridwar tended to no longer be updated any longer from that time onwards. There are cases where people who are now Muslims, some of whom are of Pakistani origin, come to Haridwar to find information on their pre-Islamic ancestors.

=== Sikhs ===
Historically, many Sikhs dispersed the ashes of the deceased at Haridwar, where their genealogical records were maintained. However, going to this specific site fell out of favour with many Sikhs, as Sikhism does not encourage or emphasize any particular place to dispose of ashes. Instead, it had become more common amongst Sikhs to dispose of ashes at Gurdwara Patalpuri Sahib in Kiratpur, Punjab, as three Sikh gurus were cremated there. According to Madan Jit Kaur, it is possible that much information about the Sikh gurus, their family, and prominent, historical Sikhs could be obtained by examining the various Panda Bahi records located at various Tirthas across the Indian subcontinent, especially in Punjab, Haryana, Uttar Pradesh, and Rajasthan. Bahi records related to the Sikh gurus have been discovered at Allahabad and Kurukshetra. Fauja Singh utilized both the Panda Bahis and Bhatt Bahis to uncover details about Guru Hargobind and Guru Tegh Bahadur. Sikhs in general used to make pilgrimages to popular Tirthas and have had their genealogical information recorded in the bahi registers by local pandas. However, with a more clear-cut demarcation of religious boundaries emerging between Sikhs and Hindus in the late 19th century during the Singh Sabha movement, this practice of Sikhs ceased.

== Language and medium ==
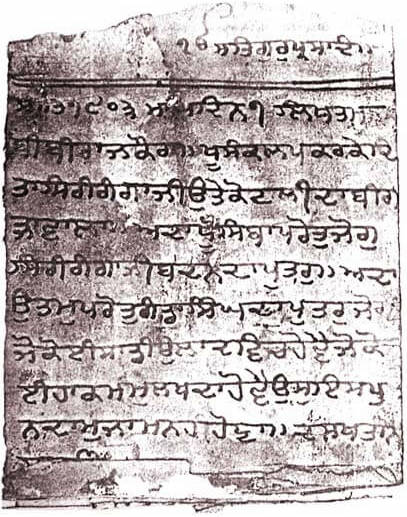
An appeal for divine help in Gurmukhi by Hari Singh Nalwa's wife, Bibi Raj Kaur, as recorded by the Pandas (priests) in Haridwar, 1846

The records were written in a local script called Landi-Mundi, similar to Devanagari script. There are examples of an "archaic Urdu" also being used in some records. Other records are written in Hindi or Punjabi.

The bahi (genealogical registers) consist of rolled-up, bound, document scrolls written on archival paper with indigo ink.

== Preservation and digitization ==
The earliest genealogical records of Haridwar used palm leaves or the leaves of birch trees (known as bhojpatra) as a medium, but they rarely survived through the ages, often being destroyed by moths, and the remaining palm leaf and birch records are rapidly disintegrating and being lost. The leaves of the genealogical registers written on long-form paper are becoming discoloured due to age and their system of indexing is only known to the pandas. There is a risk of their loss. However, some pandas have begun transferring records written on vulnerable mediums or damaged bahis to newer materials, in order to preserve the information. The bahi scrolls, often housed in private residences or in offices, are threatened by termites, heat, rats, and rain. Some pandas leave the records out in the open during winter to help air them out. Whilst after the monsoon season, the records are left out to dry in the sun. The records are stored in an almirah.

Another issue threatening the bahi tradition is poaching. This is when a group or individual approaches a panda, often under the guise of being "researchers", and requests access to their bahis. Once access is granted, the individual or group recreates the bahi data elsewhere, such as through photocopying, to cater to the clientele, resulting in a loss of traditional patrons (known as yajman) for that panda. Such cases have made some pandas hesitant to trust outsiders handling their bahis or technology.

According to Raghuvendra Tanwar, the genealogical records at Haridwar were not archived or preserved by the colonial British administrators, as they had no practical use for them. Thus, they are not kept in the collections of individual archives of Indian states.

Since 1981, the Genealogical Society of Utah has been assisting with the maintenance of the records. In a 1985 article, it was reported that the Genealogical Department of the Church of Jesus Christ of Latter-day Saints was microfilming the records at Haridwar through the use of two cameras. The institution also microfilmed genealogical registers from other places of pilgrimage besides Haridwar, such as Kurukshetra, Pehowa, Chintpurni, Jawalapur and Jawalamukhi. The records are kept at the Granite Mountain Records Vault in the United States, owned by the Church of Jesus Christ of Latter-day Saints. However, the Mormon effort to microfilm the records has been controversial, as while many pandas freely offered their records to be microfilmed by the church, the church has not made the microfilmed records available to the pandas. Other entities have approached the pandas in the past under the guise of being "genealogists" and used the copies of the records to set themselves up as pandas and supplant the original panda. This has led to some pandas turning away efforts to microfilm or digitize their records. FamilySearch has published some of the records online, arranging them by the pandit's name, their area of service, and by the volume numbers or year ranges associated with the registers. The director of FamilySearch stated that they had microfilmed around 10% of the total bahi registers of Haridwar, consisting of 476 rolls. The contract between the society and the pandas had been worded in order to require permission from the original panda holder of the microfilmed record if the society wanted to sell, give, part, or assign the microfilms in any manner.

A recent decrease in pilgrims visiting Haridwar has made the future of the records and the panda tradition uncertain. The decrease in pilgrims consulting pandas has been attributed to religious conversion and outward migration, with the populace forgetting about these ancient customs and no longer adhering to them. Today, many people do not know the name of their great-grandparents or their ancestral villages, so they cannot consult nor find their familial panda at Haridwar. Some pandas have been working towards digitization of their record collection in anticipation of the decline of the genealogical tradition. Many pandas, once completing the digitization of their record roll, will throw the original records into the Ganges to dispose of them. However, there is a divide amongst the pandas regarding digitization, and not all of them agree to have their records digitized. Some pandas believe that by digitizing their records, they are making their occupation obsolete, but they realize the importance of preserving the records.

The National Mission for Manuscripts plans to digitize the bahi records of Haridwar in the long term and does not plan to do so soon. The Indian Council of Historical Research is working on digitizing the records and releasing them in a publicly accessible format available to researchers, scholars, and historians to study stories of famines, epidemics and migrations of the past. Some, such as Prakash Mishra, believe it is better for the pandas to digitize their bahis themselves rather than having the government do it. There is also the argument that digitized records do not hold, nor carry the sentimental value that physical records do, which often contain the signatures or handwriting of one's ancestors. There are also privacy concerns regarding the possibility of publicly accessible digitized records, as many of the Hardiwar records contain private details about families.

== Organizational structure ==
The Akhil Bhartiya Tirth Purohit Mahasabha is a national organization that runs the affairs of 30,000 panda families. Meanwhile, the Ganga Sabha in Haridwar runs the affairs of 2,500 panda families there. There are around 400–450 gadiya (offices).

=== List of Panda firms of Haridwar ===
Individual panda firms of Haridwar are as follows:

- Gangaram firm (deals with the records of scheduled-castes),
- Gopalji Tomarwale firm (deals with Rajasthani records),
- Makhanlal Chakhanlal firm.

== Popular culture ==
A film on the bahi tradition of Haridwar titled Bahi: Tracing My Ancestors was released in April 2024 by Virtual Bharat.

== Locations of other Hindu genealogy registers ==
Within the greater Gangetic plains:

- Haridwar (subject of this article)
- Mathura
- Brindavan
- Kurukshetra
- Allahabad (Prayagraj)
- Benares (Varanasi)
- Ayodhya
- Gaya
- Patna
- Deoghar
- Himalayan Char Dham:
  - Yamunotri
  - Gangotri
  - Kedarnath
  - Badrinath
- Pehowa
- Chintpurni
- Jawalapur
- Jawalamukhi

Outside the greater Gangetic plains:

- Pushkar
- Puri
- Ujjain
- Dwarka
- Nasik/Triambakeshvar
- Rameshvaram (only one in South India)
- Kashmir (active prior to the Kashmir insurgency):
  - Mattan
  - Pahalgam

== See also ==
- Panjis, a similar genealogical tradition in the Mithila region
- Barot (caste)
- Bhats
- Bhat Sikhs
- Kulavruttanta
