= Bahi genealogy registers =

Genealogical tradition in the Indian subcontinent

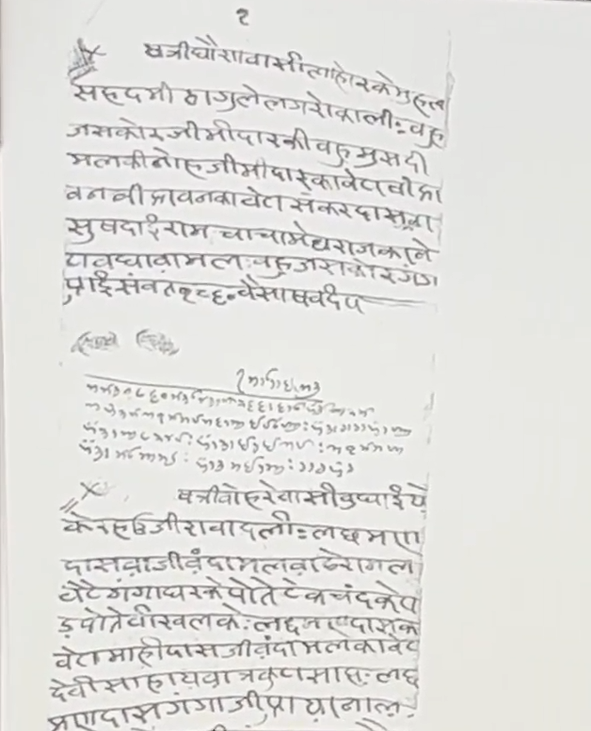
Folio of a bahi genealogical register from Haridwar, showcasing Devanagari text at the top and bottom, with Landi-Mundi text in the middle of the page

Bahi genealogy registers is a genealogical tradition found in the Indian subcontinent. The genealogical records are known as Panda Bahis. Information on the families of pilgrims to popular places of Hindu pilgrimage are recorded and maintained in voluminous records known as Vahis (also spelt as Bahi, meaning "account book"), also called Pothis, which can be described as ledgers, by a class of Brahmin Hindu priests, known formally as tirth purohits and informally as pandas. These records are considered sacrosanct both by the pilgrims (known as jajmans) and the pandas themselves. Whilst the pandas inhabit the sacred site, the pilgrims belong to various regions, classes, and castes.

The most well-known location where such records are maintained are at Haridwar, however traditional repositories of genealogical records are kept and maintained at many other locations in India, mostly in the northern Indian states of Uttar Pradesh, Himachal Pradesh, Uttarakhand (at the sites of the Chota Char Dham), Bihar, and Haryana, however one such site is located in Tamil Nadu. The records from the registers can be admitted as evidence in Indian court-cases, such as in the case of disputes over succession and property. Another term for the bahi registers is bahi-khatta.

Similar types of records are maintained by the Bhatts (bards).

== Records ==
=== Panda Bahis ===
A bahī is a type of ledger kept by clerks, accountants, secretaries, and bureaucrats working in merchant houses, royal courts, and local administrations since the late-sultanate period in the Indian subcontinent. Any contact between a panda and a pilgrim would be recorded in the bahi register. The bahi records, described as lineage records, were created and updated by a panda whenever a pilgrim or visitor paid a visit to a popular place of Hindu pilgrimage, where they carried-out certain religious rituals or ordinances. Utilizing the records, one can trace their familial lineage back many generations. The pandas wrote the records in a way so that they are organized first by village and then by jati (endogamous social subgroup unit). Thus, in a ledger for a particular village, Brahmins of the village would be listed in a section, then perhaps the Thakurs in the next section, then Jats, and so-on and so-forth. Due to this manner of organization, pandas can trace one's record only by knowing the individual's ancestral village and caste. The records usually contain information regarding the pilgrim's name, caste, occupation, birthplace, ancestral family-origin, present residence, donations/offerings (gifts are known as dan), ceremonies conducted, date of visit or the register entry, companions, and relatives/ancestors of the pilgrim. Literate pilgrims wrote their own entries into the ledgers whilst illerate pilgrims had their entries written by the panda. The entries in the records are sometimes written in code that outsiders cannot understand. One can trace their gotra lineage using the records. As per Hindu belief, all gotras can trace back to one of the seven saptarishis ("seven sages"), namely Kashyap, Atri, Vashishtha, Vishwamitra, Gautam, Jamadagni, and Bharadwaj. The records are arranged by khata (section) based upon the familial caste-grouping and region of origin.

While some of the records date back to the 15th century or earlier, most go back to the 18th century. James Lochtefeld, examining the genealocial bahi ledgers at Haridwar microfilmed by the Genealogical Society of Utah, could not find a record older than the 1770s and claims that the pilgrimage trade there and its panda-jajman dynamic began in the late-18th century. Christopher A. Bayly found that the earliest, extant pilgrim record from the Varanasi pilgrimage trade was a copper-plate inscription from 1658 and the earliest extant bahi ledger book was from 1665.

=== Bhatt Bahis ===
It was a common practice amongst the elites of Indian society to keep a group of Bhatt writers to record genealogies and events. The Bhat genealogist/bardic caste used to travel around with their ledger (known as Vahis or Bahis) and record pertinent details about the family of their clients, with their records stretching back generations into the past. They visited their patrons on the occasion of a birth of a son, wedding of a man of the family, or other special occasions in-order to record familial details. These Bhatts and their bahi tradition differed from the pandits at places of pilgrimage sites that maintained bahis, such as at Haridwar and Mattan (Kashmir), which is known as panda vahi or panda bahi, differing from the bhat bahis. A difference between the panda bahi and bhat bahi tradition is their clientele, whilst the pandas wrote bahis covering all sections of society, the bhats catered to the elites of society.

=== Sikh records ===
The Sikh gurus were clients of the bhats, with there existing bahis covering the Sikh gurus dating to the 17th and 18th centuries. According to Madan Jit Kaur, there is potential that much information about the Sikh gurus, their family, and prominent, historical Sikhs could be obtained by examining the various Panda Bahi records located at various Tirthas across the Indian subcontinent, especially in Punjab, Haryana, Uttar Pradesh, and Rajasthan. Bahi records related to the Sikh gurus have been discovered at Allahabad and Kurukshetra. Fauja Singh utilized both the Panda Bahis and Bhatt Bahis to uncover details about Guru Hargobind and Guru Tegh Bahadur. Not only the Sikh gurus, Sikhs in-general used to make pilgrimages to popular Tirthas and have their genealogical information recorded in the bahi registers by the local pandas. However, with a more clear-cut demarcation of religious boundaries emerging between Sikhs and Hindus in the late 19th century during the Singh Sabha movement, this practice of Sikhs ceased.

== Origin and purpose ==
In Hinduism, it is believed that the family is eternal and comprehensive and that human must seek out their ancestors and perform annual ceremonies for their journey to moksha. At various Tirthas, popular places of religious pilgrimage in the Indian subcontinent, large numbers of persons visit for ceremonies, festivals, and to carry out religious rites, such as the final Pinda (ceremony) for the recently deceased and also for ancestors. There are notable places where Shraadhs are performed for the Pitrs. At these sites, it became customary for the family pandits (priest) to record each visit of the family, along with their gotra, family-tree, marriages, and members present, grouped according to family and hometown. Over the centuries, these registers became an important genealogical source for many families, part of splintered families, in tracing their family tree and family history.

Each caste grouping in the Indian subcontinent has different kinds of genealogists, who have a set of inter-generational patrons, called jajmans. Usually, a traditional genealogist would visit their jajman’s house and record information in the presence of the patron family and other witnesses in their pothis (record-books), passed on from one to another. All the vital details about a particular family are recorded in the pothi, such as births, deaths, marriages, divisions in the family, and donations made for religious purposes. However, tirth purohits instead reside at popular places of pilgrimage rather than wandering around or residing at ordinary locations.

== Pandas and jajmans ==
In India, there are two broad types of traditional genealogists: those who work in places where the Ganges river flows and those who work in other locations. Another term for the pandas that is more formal and grand is teerth purohits. The pandas are conservative Brahmins whom are endogamous, one can only be born as a panda. A tīrthapurohit is a priest/ritual performer (purohit) at a sacred site (tīrtha). Meanwhile, the clients of pandas (the visitors or pilgrims) are known as yajmāns. Theoretically, each panda lineage at a particular tirth has exclusive rights to service clientele from a particular ancestral area(s) of the Indian subcontinent, which may not be geographically contiguous with each-other. The only proof that a panda services a particular region is the bahis in their possession, making them valuable. Whilst the pandas at religious sites claim to be locals, many of them actually descend from villages further away, although their family has been living in the locality of the sacred pilgrimage site for generations. An extreme case is Badrinath, whose pandas ultimately originate from South India. At locations such as Kedarnath and Badrinath, the paṇḍās shift on a seasonal-basis between the pilgrimage sites and their winter homes.

The occupation of the pandas is traditionally passed-on from father-to-son, as women cannot be pandas. Thus, possession of the bahi records stays within a panda family as per patrilineal norms. Pandas who do not have a male heir will pass on their bahis to an adopted male heir or a male relative from their extended family, such as to a affinal relative through a daughter. The bahi records held by the pandas, considered valuable family-assets, can be traded or sold, and are commonly used as loan-collateral. The bahis are treasured as they are material proof of the bond between the panda and their clientele. Possessing a bahi register is the de facto metric to be a panda. Thus, pandas are reluctant to part with their bahi records or make them publicly accessible. This hesitation on sharing their bahi registers with outsiders causes challenges for researchers and conservationists.

During the visit of the pilgrim or client, the panda would traditionally house feed, and guide them on performing rituals during their time at the pilgrimage site in-return for a donation, whether in cash or the form of an offering/gift. They would also assist their clients in other ways, such as if they were sick or needed money lent to them. However, changes in the 20th century brought upon by technological, social, and religious changes have led to the decline of the influence of the pandas, as they moved from having the status of extended family members to hired contractors.

== Preservation and digitization ==
Traditional genealogy in India is a dying practice due to urbanization, migration abroad, the impact of the Internet, modern technology, and monetary and economic concerns. The children of some pandas are not following the traditional occupation or have moved out of the city that contain the pilgrimage sites, leading to issues regarding the long-term survival of the records. During the Kedarnath floods, some records were lost and pandas were killed.

Since 1981, the Genealogical Society of Utah has been assisting with the maintenance of the records. The Genealogical Society of Utah is associated with the Church of Jesus Christ of the Latter Day Saints. In a 1985 article, it was reported that the Genealogical Department of the Church of Jesus Christ of Latter-day Saints (LDS Church) was microfilming the records at Haridwar through the use of two cameras. The institution also microfilmed genealogical registers from other places of pilgrimage besides Haridwar, such as at Kurukshetra, Pehowa, Chintpurni, Jawalapur and Jawalamukhi. One contract for the LDS Church to microfilm the bahi records stated that the church would pay 25 paisas per microfilmed page. The records are kept at the Granite Mountain Records Vault in the United States, owned by the LDS Church. Microfilmed records of bahis from Haridwar and Kurukshetra can be accessed via the National Archives of India, courtesy of the Genealogical Society of Utah. The Mormons have a religious belief regarding knowing the names of past ancestors in-order to retroactively baptize them, which motivates them to collect genealogical data from all over the world. However, the Mormon effort to microfilm the records has been controversial as while many pandas freely offered their records to be microfilmed by the church, the church has not made the records they microfilmed available to the pandas. In 1990, the Mormon effort to microfilm the bahi registers ended due to them not being able to win-over the trust of the pandas. FamilySearch has published some of the records online, arranging them by the pandit's name, their area of service, and then by the volume numbers or year ranges associated with the registers.

In February 2025, the National Archives of India announced it was planning on creating a publicly-accessible database of genealogical records sourced from pothis kept in the collection of pandas (priests) from Gaya, Kashi, Prayagraj, Kedarnath, Ujjain, Badrinath, and other places of pilgrimage where familial genealogical records are kept and maintained.

== Locations of Hindu genealogy register centres ==
There are more than twenty-five places of pilgrimage across India where genealogical records on the families of visiting pilgrims are kept by pandas (Hindu priests). Some of the various locations where bahi genealogical records are maintained are Haridwar, Varanasi, Ujjain, Nasik, Gaya, Gangotri, Rameshwaram, Pehowa, Trimbakeshwar, Chintpurni, Kurukshetra, Jawalapur, and Jawalamukhi. South Indian families mostly visited Rameshwaram and Varanasi to record their family-details. However, Haridwar remains the most comprehensive and well-preserved repository of Hindu genealogical records. The sacred sites of India where pandas who record genealogical information can be found are mostly concentrated in the greater Gangetic plain. Thus, the places where these records are kept can be divided into two broad categories: locations that lay within the greater Gangetic plains and locations that lay outside of it.

Each religious pilgrimage site is visited and renowned for different reasons. For example, Gaya and Haridwar are location for the final Hindu funerary rite, asthivisarjana, which involves immersing the cremated ashes of a deceased individual into the Ganges river. At Varanasi, death is seen as bringing immediate liberation, thus there is a large funeral industry there. Badrinath in the Himalayas is visited as a site for śrāddha (a memorial rite). Allahabad is visited to offer shaved hairs at the Triveni Sangam. Pehowa is visited regarding unnatural deaths, such as resulting from an accident, suicide, or murder.

=== List of locations ===
Within the greater Gangetic plains:

- Haridwar
- Mathura
- Brindavan
- Kurukshetra
- Allahabad (Prayagraj)
- Benares (Varanasi)
- Ayodhya
- Vrindavan
- Gaya
- Patna
- Deoghar
- Himalayan Char Dham:
  - Yamunotri
  - Gangotri
  - Kedarnath
  - Badrinath
- Pehowa
- Chintpurni
- Jawalapur
- Jawalamukhi

Outside the greater Gangetic plains:

- Pushkar
- Puri
- Ujjain
- Dwarka
- Nasik/Triambakeshvar
- Rameshvaram (only one in South India)
- Kashmir (active prior to the Kashmir insurgency):
  - Mattan
  - Pahalgam

== See also ==
- Panjis, a similar genealogical tradition in the Mithila region
- Kulavruttanta, a genealogical tradition in Maharashtra
- Barot (caste)
- Bhats
- Bhat Sikhs
