= Guru Kian Sakhian =

1790 Sikh text by Sarup Singh Kaushish

Guru Kian Sakhian is a Sikh narrative work containing 112 sakhis covering the five latter Sikh gurus, namely Guru Hargobind to Guru Gobind Singh. It is believed to have been written in 1790 by Sarup Singh Kaushish. The work was based upon the Bhatt Bahis that had been authored by the Bhatts. The text was originally in a script known as Bhattachchhari, employed by Bhatts, however it was transliterated into Gurmukhi in 1869 by Chajju Singh Kaushish.

Its author was a native of Bhadon in Thanesar parganah, which is where the text was also originally written. As per Karamjit K. Malhotra, the work is dated to 1790. The work was re-discovered by Giani Garja Singh and was published in 1986. An English adaptation by Pritpal Singh Bindra was published by Singh Bros. in 2005.

The work is written in a mixture of Punjabi and Hindi, with unique Bhatt vocabulary also appearing. There are also English words in the work, which Garja Singh explains as being "plainly anachronistic explained by some as errors on the part of copyists". The vast majority of the sakhis in the work relate to Guru Gobind Singh. The number of sakhis for each guru is as follows:

- Guru Hargobind: four
- Guru Har Rai: nine
- Guru Har Krishan: four
- Guru Tegh Bahadur: sixteen
- Guru Gobind Singh: seventy-nine

According to Chawla (2024), the over-reliance on Bhatt Vahis by Kaushish in the work makes it somewhat more unreliable as a historical record, as the Bhatts did not write their records for a scholarly purpose but rather to fulfill their role in the purohit and jajman system (Indic patron and client system). Thus, it should be treated carefully by scholars analyzing it despite new information being discovered in the work.
