= Bhagat Bani =

Compositions authored by Bhagats found within the Guru Granth Sahib

Bhagat Bani (meaning "utterances of the Bhagats"), also spelt as Bhakta Bani, is a Sikh term to refer to compositions found within Sikh scriptures (namely the Guru Granth Sahib) whose authorship is attributed to the Bhagats. They were included in the Sikh canon in a slightly-amended form. Guru Arjan included Bhagat Bani into the Adi Granth which expounded anti-caste views. The Bhagat Bani consists of saloks and shabads.

Sikhism's central scriptural book, Guru Granth Sahib, has teachings of 15 Bhagats, along with bani of Sikh Gurus, Bhats and Gursikhs. Because Sikhism believes in one human creed (no one belongs to a higher or a lower social status or caste) and that accounts for adding Bani of various authors, a total of 36, in Guru Granth Sahib, irrespective of many belonging to religions other than Sikhism. Religious writings of those Bhagats were collected by Guru Arjan. Some of them lived before Guru Nanak, but came to have a monotheistic as opposed to a polytheistic doctrine.

== History ==
According to G. S. Mann, it was likely originally Guru Amar Das's decision to include the Bhagat Bani in the Sikh corpus, based upon his belief in the continuity of divine revelation. The Bhagat Bani had already been included in the Goindwal Pothis during the guruship period of Guru Amar Das. In the Vanjara Pothi, an early Sikh text, the Bhagat Bani is not arranged in any particular order in-contrast to their canonical arrangement in the Ād Granth. Some early manuscripts, such as the Punjab University Museum MS 8 and the Bahoval Pothi, contain the works of saint-poets, such as Mirabai, which were not included in the canonized Sikh scripture.

Guru Arjan included the Bhagat Bani into the Sikh canon in 1604, choosing works by authors that were in-line with the Sikh gurus' teachings, such as an emphasis on the Nirgun form of the divine and promotion of social-equality. However, some verses by Bhagats that were not necessarily congruent with the Sikh gurus' philosophy were also included, with the caveat being that the Sikh guru provided their own commentary on their particular inclusions, such on the works on Farid, Kabir, Dhanna, and Surdas. An example of this is found in the included verses of Kabir and Farid related to the debate over divine-grace versus personal-effort or merit. Furthermore, the gurus did not agree with Farid's promotion of self-mortification and asceticism.

A detailed, exegetical work (saṭīk) on the Bhagat Bani by Tara Singh Narotam, known as Bani Bhagatan Satik, was scribed by Sundar Singh in 1882 (published in 1907 by Rai Sahib Munshi Gulab Singh and Sons, Lahore).

== Status ==
Whilst modern-day Sikhs hold the Bhagat Bani as equal in status to any other compositions found in the Guru Granth Sahib, historically, the views of Sikhs on their status are complicated. According to G. S. Mann, Guru Amar Das considered hymns authored by the Sikh gurus themselves to be of special significance, greater than the works authored by the bhagats. Amar Das divided holy persons into four groups: Bhagats, Sants, Sadhs, and Sikhs (with Sikhs being the most fortunate of the four). According to Mann, the hierarchy of the hymns based upon their authorship was as follows (higher-rank to lower):

1. Compositions authored by Guru Nanak
2. Compositions authored by the other Sikh gurus
3. Compositions authored by Sikhs who were initiated by the gurus (Gursikhs, such as the Sikh bards)
4. Compositions authored by Bhagats who had no connection to the gurus

In the Vārans authored by Bhai Gurdas, he places the Bhagats and Sikhs of the gurus on the same level, meaning a Sikh of the guru is equal to a Bhagat, the most prominent saints of other religious traditions. Some compilers of manuscripts even decided not to include any of the Bhagat Bani in their copies, such as in the case of GNDU MS 1245 and Gurdwara Bal Lila Pothi, a case of defining insiders versus outsiders to the Sikh tradition. After Guru Gobind Singh's death and the ascension of the Ād Granth to guruship, the status of the bhagat's compositions became contentious in the background of the ending of the practice of a living guru (dehdhari), which was challenged by some groups. According to Kesar Singh Chibber, Bhai Mani Singh's execution was punishment for him, earlier authoring a manuscript of the Sikh scripture (possibly the preserved manuscript with a colophon of 1713 that is still extant) in which the Bhagat Bani and also the works of the bards were consciously separated from the rest of the compositions. According to Sevadas in his work Parchi Patshahi Dasvin ki, Guru Arjan composed six hymns and dedicated them to the Bhagats, essentially implying that all of the Bhagat Bani was actually authored by Guru Arjan but under the pen-name/signature of the various Bhagats in the final verse. Tara Singh Narotam would later endorse Sevadas' position. In the late 18th century work Sikhan di Bhagatmala (later repeated in the Suraj Prakash), a viewpoint was recorded that the Bhagat Bani was the result of the earlier works of the bhagats being rejected for inclusion in the Sikh canon and only when the bhagats stayed in the Sikh court to author new compositions were they allowed to be included, implying that even the Bhagat Bani was authored under the spiritual authority of Guru Arjan. Sevadas' theory lost support in the 20th century as hymns authored by the bhagats were found in non-Sikh sources, which means they could not have been authored by Guru Arjan originally. In the early 20th century, Teja Singh Bhasaur composed a Guru Granth Sahib that did not have the controversial ragamala composition included, which was the beginning of an attempt to gradually expunge the Sikh scripture of any works not authored by the Sikh gurus. A fourth viewpoint, expounded in Giani Gurdit Singh's Itihas Sri Adi Granth based upon the Sikhan di Bhagatmala, was that all of the bhagats were actually the disciples of Guru Nanak.

According to Louis E. Fenech, the status of the bhagats vis-a-vis the Guru Granth is roughly comparable to that of the Panj Piare (including its karmic alignments) and the Guru Panth.

The breakaway Ravidassia movement holds that Ravidas was a guru rather than a bhagat, a recently-contrived viewpoint that puts them at odds with mainstream Sikhism. For the Ravidasias, the title bhagat is secondary to the title guru, thus it is disrespectful to them for Ravidas to be denoted as "Bhagat Ravidas", with them instead referring to him as "Guru Ravidas"

== List of bhagats ==
There were fifteen bhagats who were of Hindu and Muslim backgrounds. Below is a list of the Bhagats who contributed towards Sri Guru Granth Sahib:

- Bhagat Kabir
- Bhagat Ravidas
- Bhagat Farid
- Bhagat Ramanand
- Bhagat Beni
- Bhagat Namdev
- Bhagat Sadhana
- Bhagat Bhikhan
- Bhagat Parmanand
- Bhagat Sain
- Bhagat Dhanna
- Bhagat Pipa
- Bhagat Surdas
- Bhagat Jaidev
- Bhagat Trilochan

== See also ==
- Bhatt Bani
