= Ibrahim Farid =

Punjabi Sufi poet

Ibrahim Farid (1450–1552/1554), also known as Farid Sani or Farid II, was the 11th or 12th successor of the spiritual lineage of Farid Ganjshakar (1173–1266). He may have been the original author of the verses found within the Sikh scriptures written under the nom-de-plume Farid, which may have been mistakenly confused to have been authored by the earlier Farid Ganjshakar.

According to the Encyclopaedia of Sikhism, he occupied the spiritual seat of the original Farid at Pakpattan. His surviving works, written in Lahnda with Eastern Punjabi influences, reveal allegiance to both Ijadist and Vedantic Sufi principles and are pantheistic. According to Hanif (2000), reviewing arguments made by previous scholars regarding the identity of the author of the Farid verses, the terminology of the verses, their language, idioms, expressions, utilised pen-names, and apparent Vaishnavist, Vedantic, and Bhakti influences support them being authored by the later Farid rather than the original. As per Bhardwaj (2016), the verses linguistically match with a later period of Punjabi than that of Farid Ganjshakar, which support a later date of compilation around the time of Ibrahim Farid.

Guru Nanak may have met Ibrahim Farid and procured the verses from him, which were later included in the Guru Granth Sahib. According to the Puratan tradition of the Janamsakhis, Guru Nanak and Bhai Mardana were musically performing at a forest near Pakpattan when a follower of Ibrahim Farid named Kamal encountered the pair. Kamal reported his discovery of the pair to Ibrahim, who set out to meet Guru Nanak and Mardana, with a religious discourse occurring between Nanak and Ibrahim.

Dates regarding his birth and death are disputed in scholarship, Bhardwaj (2016) states that Ibrahim Farid died in Sirhind in 1552 while Hanif (2000) affirms a lifespan of 1450–1554 posited originally by Lajwanti.
