= Śrāddha =

Sanskrit term for an act performed with faith

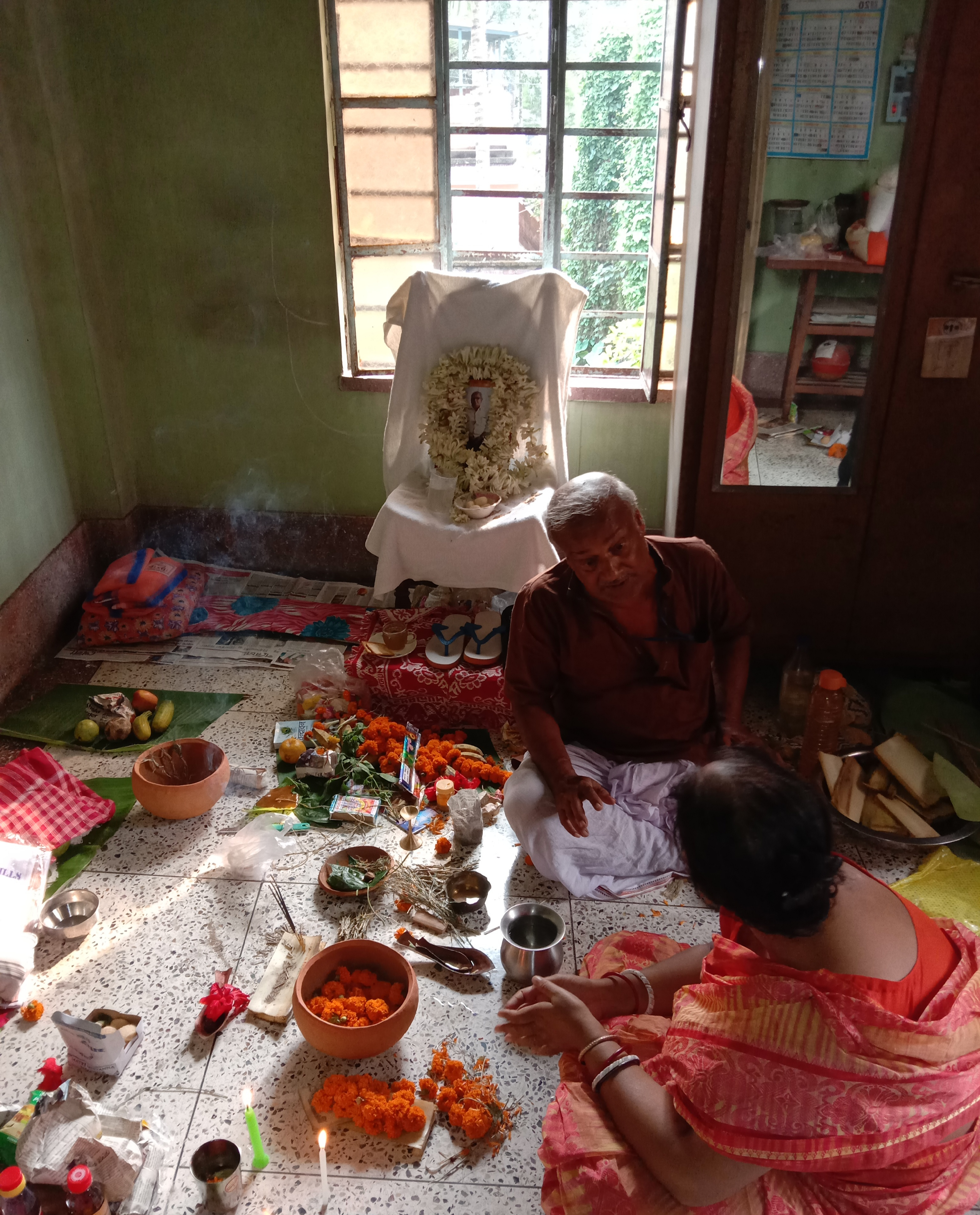
Rituals of Śrāddha in a Hindu family

Śrāddha (Sanskrit: श्राद्ध, pronounced as shraa-dh), is a period of time in the Hindu calendar during which Hindus perform rituals to pay homage to their pitṛs (ancestors). Taking part in specific rituals at this time is believed to provide peace to the ancestors in their afterlife. It is performed on the death anniversaries of the departed as per the Hindu Calendar. In addition it is also performed for the entire community of 'pitr' – both from paternal and maternal side – collectively during the Pitri Paksha or Shraaddha paksha ('fortnight of ancestors'), followed immediately by Sharad Navaratri in autumn.

== Etymology and scripture ==
The Sanskrit word śrāddha derives from śraddhā (“faith, devotion”). In ritual parlance, it denotes acts performed “in faith” for ancestors.

The concept of śrāddha is discussed in the Dharmasūtras and Purāṇas.

== Śrāddha period ==
The scripture mandate performing 96 Śrāddha karmas. However, these practices are difficult to be adhered to. In addition, offerings are to be made annually to a larger universe of forefathers – during the pitr paksha. In Hindu amanta calendar (ending with amavasya), second half of the month Bhadrapada is called Pitru Paksha: Pitṛpakṣa or Śrāddha pakṣa and its amavasya (new moon) is called sarvapitri amavasya. This part is considered inauspicious in muhurtaśāstra (electional astrology). At this time (generally September) crops in India and Nepal are ready and the produce is offered as a mark of respect and gratitude (by way of pinda) first to the ancestors be they parents or forefathers before other festivals like Navaratri begin.

Many people visit Hindu pilgrimage sites to perform, Śrāddha ceremonies, like Pehowa, Kurukshetra, Haridwar, Gokarna, Nashik, Gaya etc. Haridwar is also known for its Hindu genealogy registers.

== Rituals ==
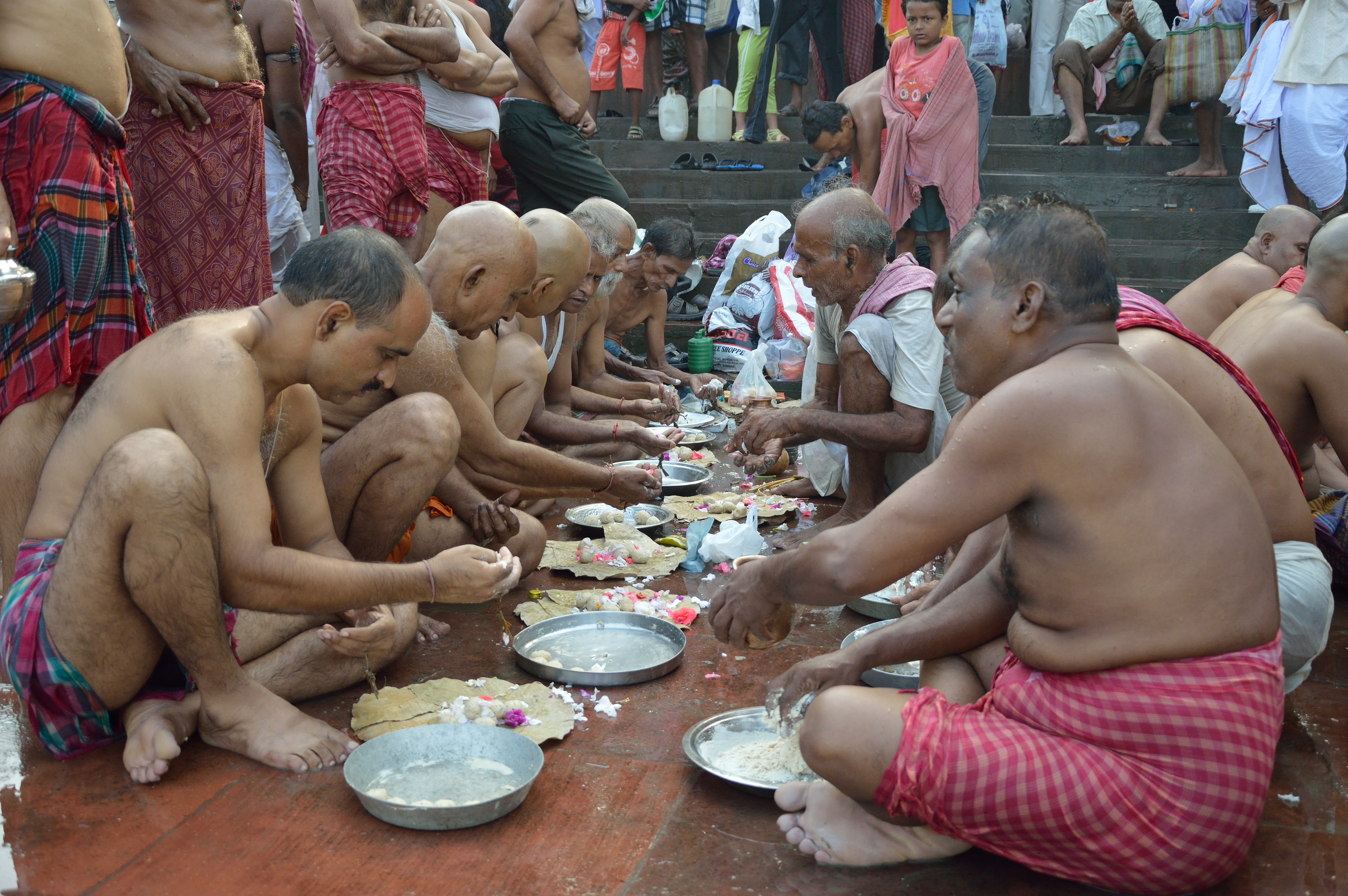
A mass Pinda Daana being done at the Jagannath Ghat, Kolkata, at end of the Pitru Paksha

Śrāddha may be performed at home shrines, temples, or river ghats. Certain pilgrimage centers are especially associated with ancestor rites, notably Gaya on the Phalgu River (Bihar), as well as Rishikesh, Haridwar, Prayagraj, and Varanasi. These sites provide priests, ghats, and facilities for pindadāna and tarpaṇa.

In practice, the karta (person who performs the Śrāddha):

(1) Invites Brahmanas (priests) that day, invokes in them the divinity of his/her parent, worships and feeds them.

(2) Performs a homa (fire ritual), appeasing Agni and Soma – the deities who transmit the offerings to the ancestors, nourish and protect them.

(3) Offers balls of rice to the departed souls ("pinda daana", offered to the Pitṛs, the ancestral spirits).The offerings are made to three generations i.e. father, grandfather and great-grandfather / mother, fathers' mother, fathers' grandmother.

(4) Crows are also revered in Hinduism and during Śrāddha the practice of offering food or pinda to crows is still current.

The karta extends hospitality to the priest and concludes the ceremony by giving "dakshina" (fees) to the brahmanaas. (There are various other actions done to show respect to the Brahmanaas, like washing their feet etc. during the course of shraaddha).

Since this is one of the more important and noble "Saṃskāras" (rituals meant to cleanse the mind and soul) that the Hindu sages have envisaged, it is imperative that the performer of the ritual understands what he or she is doing. Only then will the true intent of the ritual be fulfilled and the performer of the ritual feel completely gratified. Otherwise, the ritual becomes just a mechanical exercise on one's part.

After death, the family performs the final rituals and holam. These rites are a reflection of a person's life. They may also include Santhi-homam and Agni-homam. After the Santhi-homam, the body is sprinkled with holy water to cleanse it. Other rituals include offering food and applying herbs to the body. The Havan is performed in order to appease the God of Fire, Agni. During the homam, verses are recited while the performer asks the god to forgive the deceased's mistakes and sins.

== See also ==
- Antyesti
- Brahmin
- Hindu genealogy registers at Chintpurni, Himachal Pradesh
- Hindu genealogy registers at Haridwar
- Hindu genealogy registers at Jawalamukhi, Himachal Pradesh
- Hindu genealogy registers at Kurukshetra, Haryana
- Hindu genealogy registers at Peohwa, Haryana
- Hindu genealogy registers at Trimbakeshwar, Maharashtra
- Hindu genealogy registers at Varanasi
- Pitrs
- Sandhyavandhanam
- Vedic priesthood
- Śrāddha (Buddhadharma)
- Pinda (riceball)
- Pitru Paksha
- Tarpana
- Ancestor worship
- Gaya
- Hindu rituals
