= Bhat Vahis =

Historical Sikh records created and maintained by Bhatts

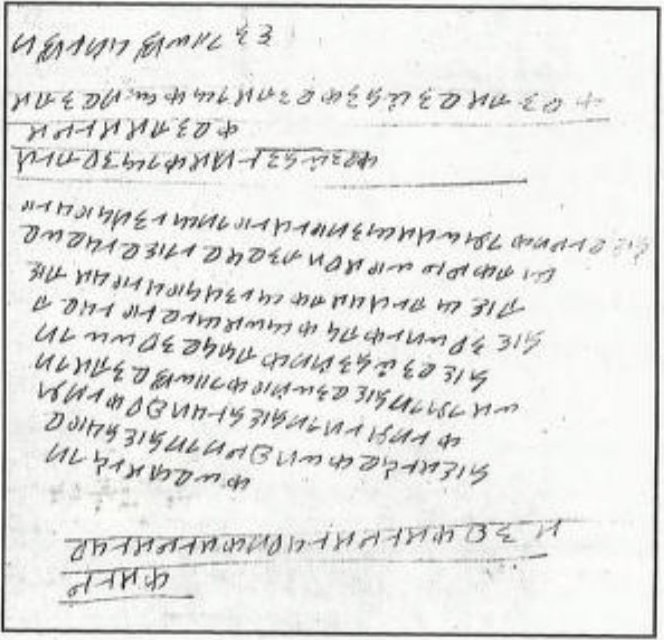
Bhat Vahi entry from the 'Bhat Vahi Purbi Dakhni', which lists Guru Gobind Singh's family members using the "Guru" title

Bhat Vahis, or Bhatt Bahis, were scrolls or records maintained by Bhatts, also known as Bhatra. The term is used to refer to the genealogical records maintained by wandering Bhat genealogists for their local clientele. They are similar to the Panda Bahi records found at places of pilgrimage across the Indian subcontinent that were created by Tirth Purohits/Pandas. The word vahi or bahi refers to a register of records. The records contain genealogical, historical, and sociological details.

The majority of Bhat Sikhs originate from Punjab and were amongst the first followers of Guru Nanak. Bhat tradition and Sikh text states their ancestors came from Punjab, where the Raja Shivnabh and his kingdom became the original 16th century followers of Guru Nanak, the founder of Sikhism. The Raja's grandson Prince Baba Changa earned the title ‘Bhat Rai’ – the ‘Raja of Poets, and then settled himself and his followers all over India as missionaries to spread the word of Guru Nanak, where many northern Indians became Bhat Sikhs. The majority were from the northern Brahmin caste (Bhat clan),(Bhat (surname)) as the Prince Baba Changa shared the Brahmin heritage. The sangat also had many members from different areas of the Sikh caste spectrum, such as the Hindu Rajputs and Hindu Jats who joined due to Bhat Sikh missionary efforts. The Bhats also contributed 123 compositions in the Sri Guru Granth Sahib (pp.1389–1409), known as the "Bhata de Savaiyye". There hereditary occupations consisted of bards, poets, missionaries, astrologists, genealogists, salesmen. There is also a Brahmin group associated with the name Bhat.

== Etymology ==
The word bhat refers to a bard while the word bahi or vahi refers to a scroll.

== History ==
Around the period of the Sikh gurus, it was a common practice amongst the elites of Indian society to keep a group of Bhatt writers to record genealogies and events. The Bhat genealogist/bardic caste used to travel around with their ledger (known as Vahis or Bahis) and record pertinent details about the family of their clients, with their records stretching back generations into the past. They visited their patrons on the occasion of a birth of a son, wedding of a man of the family, or other special occasions in-order to record familial details. There were also pandits at places of pilgrimage sites that maintained bahis, such as at Haridwar and Mattan (Kashmir), although this is known as panda vahi or panda bahi, differing from the bhat bahis. A difference between the panda bahi and bhat bahi tradition is their clientale, whilst the pandas wrote bahis covering all sections of society, the bhats catered to the elites of society.

The Sikh gurus were clients of the bhats, with there existing bahis covering the Sikh gurus dating to the 17th and 18th centuries. According to Giani Garja Singh, the first Sikh guru to have Bhatts in their court was Guru Arjan. According to Pashaura Singh, the Bhatts were bards of Brahmin origin and they served from Guru Hargobind's time to Guru Gobind Singh's period. There were eleven hereditary Bhatts who served the Sikh gurus and whose compositions are included in the Guru Granth Sahib, collectively known as the Bhattan De Savayye, with the authors of the Bhatt Bahis being descended from them. The bahi genealogy register scrolls created by them individually covered the Sikh gurus (as detailed genealogies and chronicles on them) and their relatives but also other prominent Sikhs, with the records being maintained and updated until relatively recently by successive generations of patrons and clients.

The descendants of the Bhatt genealogists of the historical Sikhs now live mostly in present-day Haryana. In the 1950's, a Sikh named Giani Garja Singh took Gurmukhi transliterations of the original Bhattakhri registers related to the Sikh gurus from the descending families of the original Bhatt genealogists, chiefly from Bhatt Man Singh of Sarsindhu village in Jind district, Punjab (now part of Haryana). These Gurmukhi transliterations of the original entries was published in Giani Garja Singh's text, Shahid Bilas Bhai Mani Singh. Not all of the Gurmukhi transliterations were published in this work, the rest remain in the collection of the Department of Punjab Historical Studies at Punjabi University, Patiala.

== Script ==
The Bhat Vahis were written in a script called Bhattakhri (or Bhaṭṭāchchharī, a type of business-shorthand employed on a family-level similar to the Landa scripts, such as Mahajani), this script was employed by historical Bhatt writers. (Note: Also spelt as 'Bhatt Akhri','Bhat Akhri', or 'Bhatakshri'.) The Shahid Bilas was also originally written in this script rather than Gurmukhi. Modern scholars are not familiar with it and Gurmukhi transliterations of the works that were originally written in Bhattakhri were provided by Giani Garja Singh, who could read the script. Garja Singh's transliterations are now held at Punjabi University in Patiala. Another figure who provided Gurmukhi transliterations of the script was Bhatt Chhaju Singh Kaushik. The script was a Landa script, similar in resemblance to Mahajani.

== Bardic tradition as a source of Sikh history ==
These bards constantly attended upon or visited their patron families reciting panegyrics to them and receiving customary rewards. They also collected information about births, deaths and marriages in the families and recorded it in their scrolls. These scrolls containing information going back to several past centuries formed the valued part of the bards` hereditary possessions. A group of Bhatts was introduced to Guru Arjan, Nanak V, by Bhatt Bhikha who had himself become a Sikh in the time of Guru Amar Das.

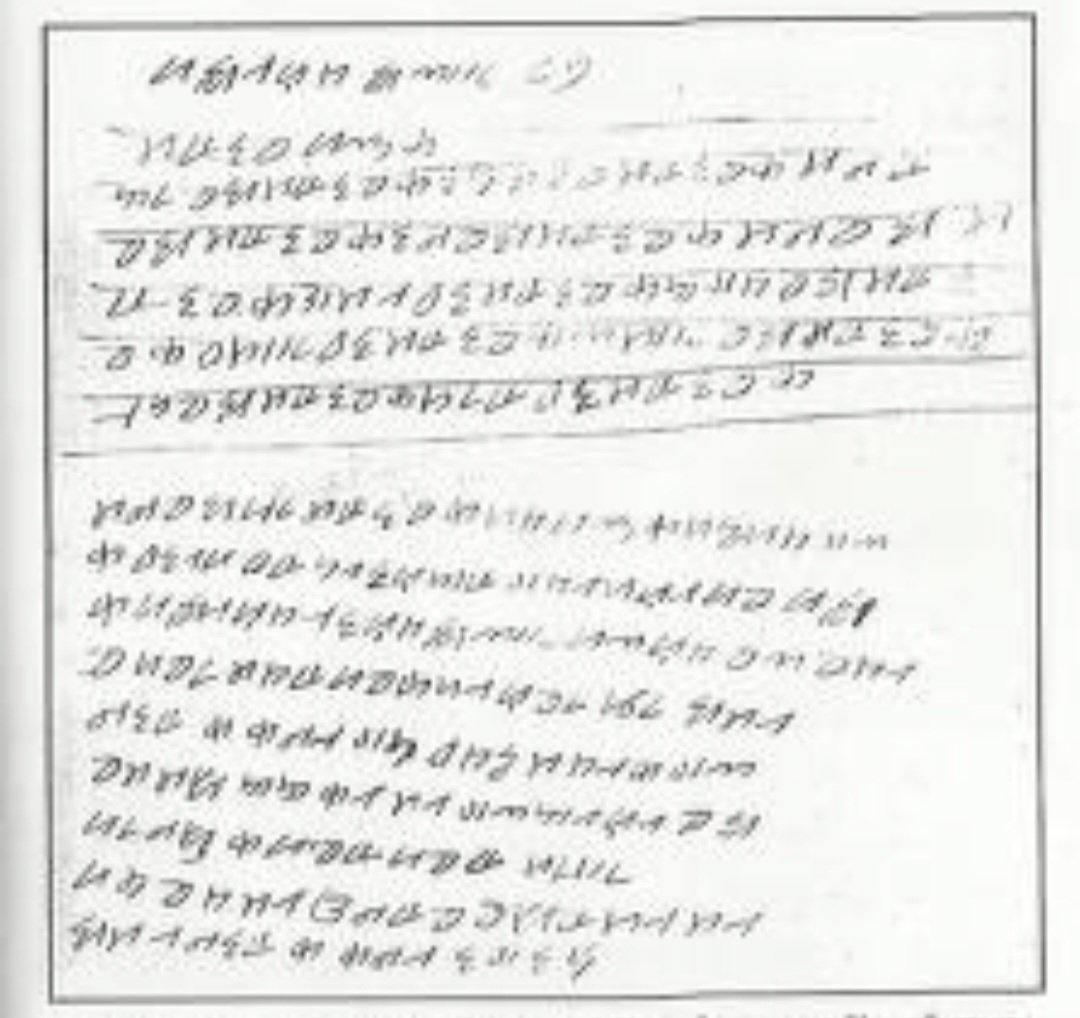
Bhat Vahi entry from the 'Bhat Vahi Purbi Dakhni', discussing prominent Sikh figures

According to Bhai Gurdas' Varan (XI. 21), and Bhai Mani Singh's Sikhan di Bhagat Mala, he had once visited Guru Arjan with the sangat of Sultanpur Lodhi. Some of the Bhatts who came into the Sikh fold composed hymns in honour of the Gurus which were entered in the Guru Granth Sahib by Guru Arjan. These Bhatts and their successors too maintained their vahis in which they recorded information concerning the Gurus, their families and some of the eminent Sikhs. These old vahis are still preserved in the descendant families, now scattered mostly in Haryana state. Their script is bhattakshari, a kind of family code like lande or mahajani. During the late 1950s, a researcher, Giani Garja Singh, obtained Gurmukhi transcripts of some of the entries pertaining to the Guru period, from Guru Hargobind (15951644) to Guru Gobind singh ji. However, Garja Singh transliterated the original scrolls kept in private familial collections into Gurmukhi, which is not a translation of them. Some of these were published as footnotes to Shahid Bilas Bhai Mani Singh, edited by Giani Garja Singh and published by Punjabi Sahitya Akademi, Ludhiana, in 1961. In 1972, Garja Singh visited the Gurmat College in Patiala to hold conversations about the Bhatt Bahi records. Garja Singh died in 1977.

As per Garja Singh, the Bhatt Vahis are descriptive rather than narrative, with them being very brief about actual events they happened to record. Instead, they place importance on recording precise genealogical information, dates, and times of certain events. The Bhatts emphasized on recording details related to ancestry, gotra, or clan of the individuals they recorded details about. Furthermore, they recorded the year, month, tithī (dark or moonlit part of the lunar month), day, and often even the exact time of day of a specific incident. An example of the precise details recorded in the records is the entry for Guru Hargobind's birth from the Bhatt Vahi Multani Sindhi, provided by Pashaura Singh:

Bhatt Vahi Multani Sindhi

gurū arjan jī mahal pañchmā beṭā gurū rām dās jī kā potā srī ṭhākur dās jī kā baṅs srī hari dās jī kī sūraj baṅsī gosal gotrā soḍhī khatrī de grahi meṅ mātā gaṅgā jī ke udar thīṅ gām waḍālī praganā guru chakk ke malhāṅ sambat solāṅ sau santālīs māṅh asāḍh dihu ikkīs giā savā pahir ren rahī ekk chamatkārī bāl paidā hūā jis kā sabh nāuṅ srī hari gobind jī rākhā kul prohit siṅgh jī ko mānā guru dī kaṛāhī kī.

Translation:
Translation (Pashaura Singh)

In the house of Guru Arjan Ji, the Fifth Master, son of Guru Ram Das Ji, grandson of Thakur Das Ji of the lineage of Hari Das Ji of the solar lineage of subcaste Gosal of Sodhi Khatri, a radiant son was born from the womb of Mata Ganga Ji at the village of Wadali, in the pragana of Guru's Chakk, in the year (sambat) of sixteen hundred and forty-seven and the twenty-first day of the month of asadh, when one and a quarter of night still remained before dawn. The child was given the name of Har Gobind Ji, while the family priest (prohit) Singh Ji was recognized. In the name of the Guru sacred food (karah prasad) was distributed.

The dates and details found in the Bhatt Bahis may diverge and differ from popularly accepted facts, such as in-regards to dates associated with the Sikh gurus, such as date of their births. The Guru Kian Sakhian was a 1790 work by Sarup Singh Kaushish which utilized the Bhatt Vahis to record sakhis (stories) related to the latter gurus by transliterating their contents into Gurmukhi. Garja Singh's manuscript copies of the Bhatt Bahis are held at the Department of Punjab Historical Studies at Punjabi University Patiala.

== Reliability ==
According to historians, Bhat Vahis have to be used with caution when retrieving contemporary evidences. There are Vahis that were written by Bhatts who were in attendance of the Gurus, such as Vahis written by Bhatt Narbud Singh who accompanied Guru Gobind Singh to Nanded, and on the other hand, there are also some of the Vahis that were not written as eyewitnesses but instead after the occurrence of an event.

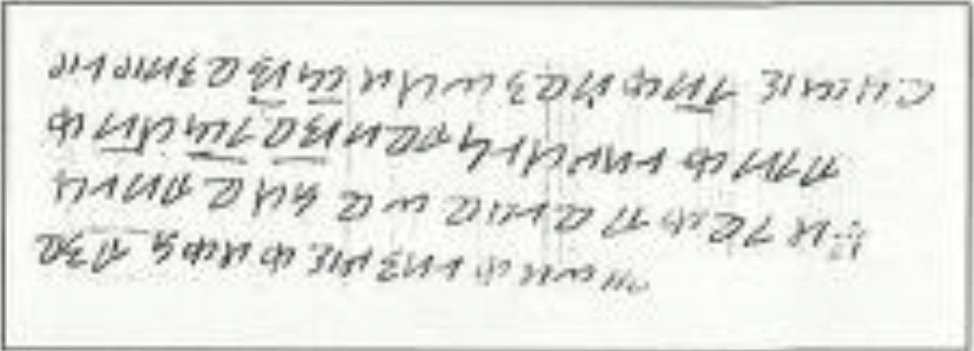
Bhat Vahi entry on the marriage ceremony of Sahibzada Ajit Singh, dated to 1761 Bk. (ca.1705 C.E.)

Historian Harbans Singh mentioned the following about the records after their discovery:

On the whole, these Bhat Vahis are a mine of information of historical and sociological value.

Historian Jeevan Deol while talking about Bhat Vahis says:

The authenticity of some of the bhatt vahi extracts published by Garja Singh is, however, rendered doubtful by the fact that neither the originals nor the extracts made by him seem to be present in any institutional collection in the Punjab.

Balwant Singh Dhillon mentions:

Guru Kian Sakhian is said to be largely based on the Bhatt Vahis which its author has got from his ancestors. Originally, he wrote it in Bhattakhri, a peculiar form of Devanagari without vowel symbols. In 1868 Chhajju Singh, a descendant of the author converted it into Gurmukhi. However, its original in Bhattakhri and its second version in Gurmukhi are no longer extant, which puts a big question mark on the very origin of this document.

According to Chawla (2024), the vahis were not written by the Bhatts in an attempt to leave a historical record but rather to fulfill their role in the purohit and jajmani system (client and patron), thus they should be carefully analyzed. Pashaura Singh states that while they provided details about the Sikh gurus and other historical Sikh figures, they should be used "judiciously" and "cautiously".

== List of Bhat Vahis ==
- Bhat Vahi Jadobansian
- Bhat Vahi Multani Sindhi
- Bhat Vahi Purbi Dakhni
- Bhat Vahi Talauda Pargana
- Bhat Vahi Tumar Bijlauton ki
- Bhat Vahi Badhson
- Bhat Kar Sindu
- Bhat Vahi Kalahandi

== See also ==
- History of Sikhism
- Writers of the Guru Granth Sahib
- Sikh scriptures
- Sakhi
- Janamsakhis
- Sikh culture
