= Savaiya =

Form of poetry

Sawaiya is a form of poetry which is written in praise of someone in which every verse is a quarter times the length of common verse. The plural of Savaiya is Savaiye (Punjabi: ਸ੍ਵਯੇ (Gurmukhi)). Famous among them are Tav-Prasad Savaiye, 33 Savaiye, Bhattan De Savaiye.

== See also ==
- 33 Savaiye
