= Bhagat Beni =

One of the fifteen sants and Sufis

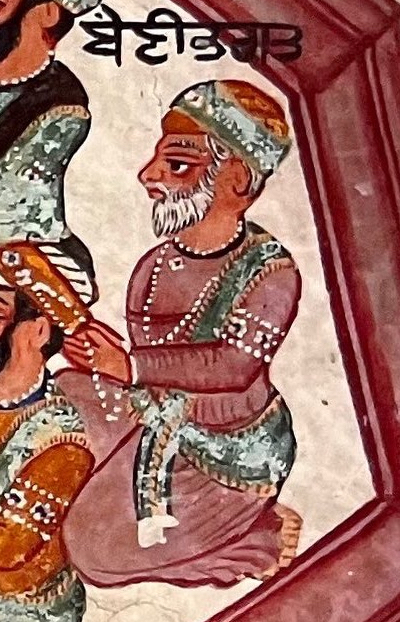
Detail of Bhagat Beni from a Sikh fresco, circa mid-19th century

Bhagat Beni (Punjabi: ਭਗਤ ਬੈਣੀ, pronunciation: [bhæɡæt̪ bɛɳiː]) is one of the fifteen sants and Sufis, whose teachings have been incorporated in the Guru Granth Sahib, it is believed he spent most of his time in prayer and meditation, who often neglected the household needs while in meditation and prayer. According to W. H. McLeod, Beni is unknown apart from his three compositions that were included in the Guru Granth Sahib.

== Brief biography ==
Nothing is known about the exact date and place of birth of Bhagat Beni. In spite of all this uncertainty, he can be called a contemporary of Guru Nanak. It seems that Beni lived in this world somewhere between mid-15th century to the mid-16th century. He was a well-educated scholar, with a very humble temperament. He was ever ready to serve the true preceptor which provided him real comfort:

"Beloved! other than Thee none else have I. Nothing else do I love; in Thy grace lies my joy." SGGS-61

== Principles and ideals ==
Bhagat Beni makes a severe denunciation of the Hindu rituals and austerities of Hatha Yoga so that common man learns of the real motive of true religion i.e. cultivation of the Divine Name. He has three hymns on this subject included in the Guru Granth Sahib under Siri Raag (P.93), Ramkali (974) and Prabhati (1351) musical measures. In these hymns he has severely denounced in an apt and cryptic tone the ritual formalism and advised us to ever remember the True Lord. In his hymn in Ramkali measure, beginning with "The passage ira, Pingala and Sukhmana, all in one place, at the tenth Door abide" says: The Master's teaching in mind he bears, His mind and body to the Lord's devotion dedicating. By the enlightenment by the Master granted, are crushed demons of evil. Lord! Beni for devotion to Thy Name supplicates. SGGS-974

This shows that he, who is fully absorbed in the Divine Name, has got rid of his sleep. He who has to overcome his five senses, must love the Lord's Name. The nine doors open only to develop love for and attachment with this manifest world. However, the tenth door is mystical through which one develops unity with God. A proper use of this saves man from failing to the trap of Maya. As such, his life is not wasted, and he remains united to his object. The Divine Light kindles within him the four-pronged lamp, a musical measure which comprises five instruments begins to play in his mind. Thus, in this hymn, Bhagat Beni lays emphasis on discarding ritualism and on developing unity with the Lord through the feeling of devotion. On an analysis of the language of this hymn, some scholars opine that Beni has denounced 'the limbs smeared with sandalwood paste and tulsi leaves placed on the forehead yet the heart be like one holding knife in hand (SGGS 1351). Thus, this hymn is said to stand in binary opposition to the Sikh precepts, but the fact is that he makes a categorical statement that the state of mystical unity with the Lord includes the fruits of Yoga practices and pilgrimages. The hymn included under Prabhati measure paints a true picture of a man caught in a life of rituals and sham. Beni says: " You besmear your body with sandalwood paste and put tulsi leaves on your forehead, but in the hand of your heart you have a sharp dagger. How deceitful you are! still you pretend to have your consciousness fixed on the Lord. You are a prey to agnosticism. In your heart of hearts you have been conspiring either to kill someone or to usurp the property of the other. You dance before your deity so as to please it, but your mind is ever full of wicked designs. Thus, all that you are doing is futile because you are by nature wicked, immoral and impious. No doubt, you wear a rosary of tulsi-beads, a pastemark on your forehead, but all this is a sham because you have not purified yourself from within. Thus all your actions are futile, deceitful and full of wastage, How can the Lord be pleased with such action? What is acceptable to Him is the prayer offered in a humble and devout manner. Therefore, the seeker must make a note that: Whoever the essence of the self has not contemplated, All his action are hollow, blind. Saith Beni : Let man by the Master's guidance On the Lord meditate. None without the holy Preceptor finds the path. SGGS-1351 Guru Arjan Dev has also said that Bhagat Beni attained enlightenment only through the Holy Word. Bhai Gurdas has also referred to the life of Bhagat Beni in the 14th stanza of his tenth Var. Therein he says that Beni was so close to the Lord that the latter Himself took the form of a king and fulfilled all his material needs (The Lord) protects honour of the devotee and calls on him as a king. He provides him all solace and takes care of his expenses ... ... He came down from there to the devotee and showed his benevolent love. Thus He makes devotees ford Him.

From the above it appears that Bhagat Beni had completely coalesced himself with the Lord. Bhagats generally have in a way, put the Lord under their spell : Thou to Thy devotees art compliant- The devotees from Thee have strength SGGS-962

== Death ==
His date of death is unknown.
