= Bhagat Bhikhan =

Medieval Indian saint of the Bhakti movement

Bhagat Bhikhan (Punjabi: ਭਗਤ ਭੀਖਨ, pronunciation: [bhæɡæt̪ bhiːkʰɪn]) (1480–1573), also spelt as Bhikan, was a medieval Indian Bhakti poet-saint, whose two hymns are included in the Guru Granth Sahib. There were two saints of that time sharing the same name — Bhagat Bhikhan and Sheikh Bhikhan, the Sufi.

== Early life ==
He was born in a Hindu family, at Kakori near Lucknow in present-day Uttar Pradesh state in India. Other sources, such as The Encyclopaedia of Indian Literature, describe him as having an Islamic background. Surinder Singh Jodhka also describes Bhikan as being a Muslim Sufi. Bhagat Bhikhan was a devotee in the tradition of Bhagat Ravidas and Bhagat Dhanna (Ramanandi Sampradaya).

== Legacy ==
His hymns in the Guru Granth Sahib reflect his dedication to the Name of God which he describes as "cure for all ills of the world."

Bhagat Bhikhan was the most learnt of the learned men of the time of Mughal Emperor Akbar. For many years, he was engaged in teaching and instructing the people. He left several children who were adorned with piety, wisdom, knowledge and virtue.

== See also ==
- Ramanandi Sampradaya
