= Bhatt Kalshar =

Brahmin bard

Bhatt Kal Sahar was a Brahmin bard in the court of Guru Arjan, whose 54 hymns are incorporated in Adi Granth. The title Bhatt is given to learned Brahmins. Traditionally, Kal Sahar is believed to a collector of hymns of other Bhatts which were later incorporated into Guru Granth Sahib by Guru Arjan.
