= Jawalapur =

- Village
- Location in Punjab, India Jawalapur (India)
- Coordinates: 31.308826°N 75.380931°E
- Country: India
- State: Punjab
- District: Kapurthala

Government
  - Type: Panchayati raj (India)
  - Body: Gram panchayat

Population (2011)
  - Total: 309
- Sex ratio 168/141♂/♀

Languages
  - Official: Punjabi
  - Other spoken: Hindi
- Time zone: UTC+5:30 (IST)
- PIN: 144601
- Telephone code: 01822
- ISO 3166 code: IN-PB
- Vehicle registration: PB-09
- Website: kapurthala.gov.in

Jawalapur is a village in Kapurthala district of Punjab State, India. It is located 11 kilometres (6.8 mi) from Kapurthala, which is both the district and sub-district headquarters. The village is administrated by a Sarpanch who is an elected representative.

== Demography ==
According to the 2011 Census of India, Jawalapur had 62 houses and a population of 309, of which 168 were male and 141 female. The literacy rate was 78.06%, higher than the state average of 75.84%. The population of children in the age group 0–6 years was 31, being 10.03% of the total population. The child sex ratio was approximately 824, lower than the state average of 846.

== Population data ==
Particulars	Total	Male	Female
Total No. of Houses	62	-	-
Population	309	168	141
Child (0-6)	31	17	14
Schedule Caste	158	84	74
Schedule Tribe	0	0	0
Literacy	78.06 %	82.12 %	73.23 %
Total Workers	121	97	24
Main Worker	121	0	0
Marginal Worker	0	0	0
