= Bhatt Salh =

Sarswat Brahmin bard in the court of Guru Arjan

Bhatt Salh was a Sarswat Brahmin bard in the court of Guru Arjan, whose three hymns are present in Guru Granth Sahib, the holy book of Sikhs.
