= Bhatt Gayand =

Brahmin bard whose 13 hymns are present in Guru Granth Sahib

Bhatt Gayand was a Brahmin bard in the court of Guru Arjan, whose 13 hymns are present in Guru Granth Sahib, the sacred scripture of the Sikhs.

== Usage of the term Waheguru ==
The hymns to Waheguru contained in the Guru Granth Sahib were composed by Bhatt Gayand.
