= Bhatt Jalap =

Brahmin bard

Bhatt Jalap was a Brahmin bard in the court of Guru Arjan, whose five hymns are present in Guru Granth Sahib, the holy book of Sikhs.
