= Bhatt Mathura =

Brahmin bard

Bhatt Mathura was a Brahmin bard in the court of Guru Arjan, whose 14 hymns are present in Guru Granth Sahib, the holy book of Sikhs. The title Bhatt is given to learned Brahmins and he is Bhatt Kirat’s brother.

== Early life ==
Born in a Gaur brahmin family of Kaushish/Kaushik gotra to Bhat Bikha this family received the title of Bhat from Guru himself because of their knowledge of Sanskrit and Gurumukhi.

== Battle and martyrdom ==
In the second battle of shri Har Gobindpur Bhat Mathura ji fought with conspicuous courage as Senapati of khalsa army. Bairam Khan, the Mughal commander, challenged him for duel covered his full body with armour he considered himself invincible. However, when he again open his mouth to throw a challenge, Bhat ji thrust his dagger in his mouth and killed him with one stroke. He met his end in this battle being fully injured fighting from front killing many Mughal deputy-commanders like Bairam khan.
