= Bhatt Balh =

Brahmin bard in the court of Guru Arjan,

Bhatt Balh was a Brahmin bard in the court of Guru Arjan, whose five hymns are present in Guru Granth Sahib, the holy book of Sikhs.
