= Bhatt Bhalh =

Brahmin bard in the court of Guru Arjan,

Bhatt Bhalh was a Brahmin bard in the court of Guru Arjan, whose one hymn is present in Guru Granth Sahib, the holy book of Sikhs.
