= Bhatt Nalh =

Brahmin bard in the court of Guru Arjan

Bhatt Nalh was a Brahmin bard in the court of Guru Arjan, whose 16 hymns are present in Guru Granth Sahib, the holy book of Sikhs.
