= Bhatt Harbans =

Brahmin bard

Bhatt Harbans was a Brahmin bard in the court of Guru Arjan, whose two hymns are present in Guru Granth Sahib, the holy book of Sikhs.
