= Bhatra Sikhs =

Sikh group

Languages
- English, Hindi, Panjabi, Urdu

Religion
- Sikhi

The Bhatra Sikhs (also known as Bhatt or Bhat Sikhs) are a Sikh caste. They claim to originate from the Bhats (bards), religious musicians who served the Sikh gurus. In Punjab, they were originally confined to the Sialkot district but after the partition of India and creation of Pakistan in 1947, many would move to India. Their traditional occupation was hand-reading. During the 20th century, Bhatra Sikhs established a diaspora overseas. In India, there are two distinct groups associated with the name Bhat, a Brahmin group and a genealogist/bardic caste.

== History ==
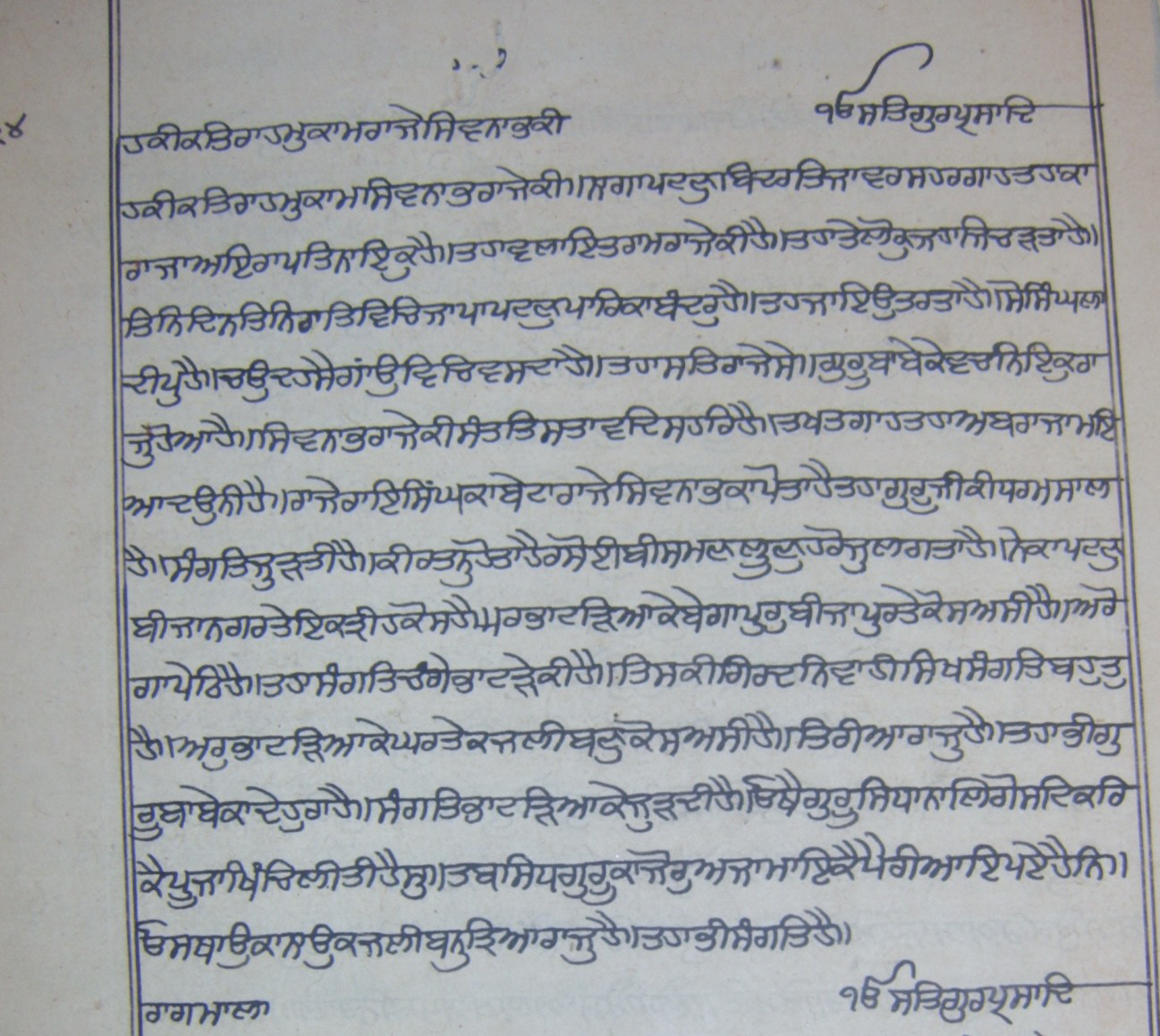
Hakikat-Rah-Muqaam-Shivnabh-Raje-Ki, description of the meeting of Guru nanak and Raja Shivnabh [p. 1248] of an early 18th Century handwritten copy of Bhai Bannu’s Bir, the start of the Sikh Bhat Sangat.

Many academics suggests that the word Bhatra is a diminutive form of the word Bhat which comes from Sanskrit and means a "bard or panegyrist". Dharam Singh writes that in the Sikh tradition Bhatts are poets with the personal experience and vision of the spirituality of the Sikh Gurus whom they eulogise and celebrate in their verses, he suggests that Bhat is not an epithet for a learned Brahman". However the late Giani Gurdit Singh confirmed that the Bhat bards who contributed to the Guru Granth Sahib were descended from the Brahmins in his book, Bhatt Te Uhnah Di Rachna. They originated from the Gaur (Gaud) or Sarsut (Saraswat) Brahmin lineage and started associating with the Sikh Gurus during the guruship of Guru Arjan. Some of the verses of the Guru Granth Sahib were authored by Bhat ragis (musicians). The names of some Punjabi bards who survive in early references who flourished between the 10th and 15th centuries are Jodha and Vira, Lalla and Behlima, Mahima and Hasana, Rana Kailash and Maldeo, Sikandar and Birham, Tunda and Asraja. The bards were likely mostly oral traditions rather than literary. Their script was likely Sharada.

Ethne K. Marenco claimed that in Punjab, after their conversion to Sikhism, several castes including the [Sikh] Bhats largely abandoned their "traditional occupation" in favour of other professions, particularly in the "industry, trade and transport" sectors. Jagtar Singh Grewal notes that the "compositions" by some Bhatra Sikhs who were in service of the Sikh Gurus were added in the Guru Granth Sahib. In the book, The Making of Sikh Scripture, Gurinder Singh Mann writes that a large number of the bards who contributed to the Guru Granth Sahib were upper-caste Hindus who came to the Sikh court in the sixteenth century in praise of the Guru and their court. As per Pashaura Singh, the eleven hereditary Bhatts who served the Sikh gurus, whose works are the Bhattan De Savayye, were of Brahmin origin and their descendants wrote the Bhatt Bahi genealogy registers. According to Louis E. Fenech, many of the Sikh Bhatts during the period of the Sikh gurus were Brahmins but some of them were Muslim Mirasis. Guru Arjan's decision to include the Bhatt Bani in his compilation of the Ād Granth was a reflection of influence of Mughal courtly culture.

=== Migration to the United Kingdom ===
In the 1920s, the Bhatra Sikhs established a diaspora in the United Kingdom. Settlers in the UK earned an income by selling from suitcases of clothes by going door-to-door.

Between the First and Second World War, the Bhatra Sikhs migrated to Britain. They settled mostly in Bristol, Cardiff, Glasgow, Liverpool, London, Portsmouth, Southampton and Swansea with small populations of theirs also settling in Birmingham, Edinburgh, Manchester and Nottingham. They also settled in Belfast, Northern Ireland. According to William Owen Cole, the Bhatra Sikhs were among the earliest Sikhs to arrive in Britain and they arrived as pedlars.

Nesbitt states that in the UK, the Bhatra men initially worked as "door-to-door salesmen" and later as shopkeepers and property renters. She suggests that in the recent times, they have started working in diverse fields. After the end of the Second World War, the Bhatra Sikhs established gurdwaras in the regions where they resided.

== Relation to Sikhism ==
Many of the records produced by the Bhatt Sikhs have been useful for reconstructing the lives of the Sikh gurus, their relatives, and other prominent Sikhs.

Bhatra Sikhs tend to be devout Khalsa Sikhs who maintain their kesh and strictly observed gurpurabs. On the day of the birthdays of Sikh gurus as per the jantris (traditional calendar), they hold diwans, a practice known as din dey din manauna, where as other Sikhs tend to celebrate gurpurabs on the nearest Sundays to the birthday at their gurdwaras rather than on the exact day. They tend to hold on to traditions, even in the diaspora, such as Bhatra Sikh women observing purdah or using an actual horse for the wedding ceremony known as ghori-chardna (riding a mare) ritual.

== Status and occupation ==
Eleanor Nesbitt and William Hewat McLeod suggested that they are a caste. McLeod stated that the Bhatra Sikhs have an "extremely small" population and they are from some villages of the Gurdaspur and Sialkot districts of the Punjab region. McLeod claimed that the Bhatras of the Gurdaspur and Sialkot districts, traditionally, used to work as "fortune-tellers and hawkers". Other Sikhs tend to regard Bhatra Sikhs as a low-caste group and relations between Bhatra Sikhs and other Sikhs remains minimal in the British diaspora. British Bhatra Sikh women are more inclined to wear colourful clothing, which distinguishes them from other Sikh women who regard them to wear a peindu (traditional) style.

== See also ==
- List of Sikhism-related topics
- Bhat Vahis
- Bhattan De Savaiye
- Brahmin Sikhs
