= Gond (raga) =

Hindustani raga

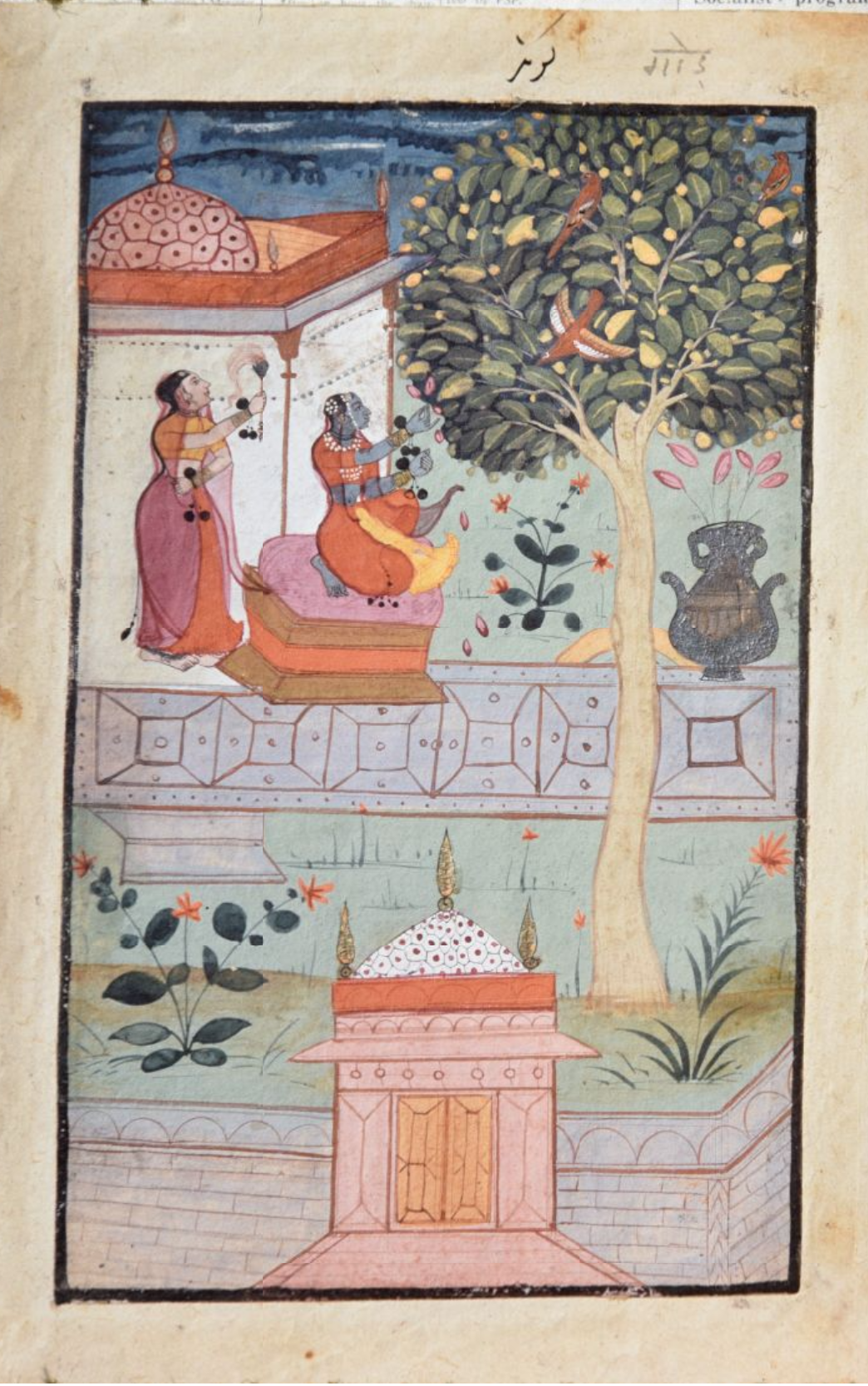
- Thaat: Bilaval
- Arohana: Sa Re Ga Ma, Pa Dha Ni Dha Ni Sa
- Avarohana: Sa Ni Dha Ni Dha Pa, Ma Ga, Re Sa
- Vadi: Sa
- Samavadi: Ma
- Synonym: Bilaval Gaund
- Similar: Gunkali

This is an Indian musical raga (composition) that appears in the Sikh tradition from northern India and is part of the Guru Granth Sahib. Every raga has a strict set of rules which govern the number of notes that can be used; which notes can be used; and their interplay that has to be adhered to for the composition of a tune.

In the Guru Granth Sahib, the Sikh holy Granth (book) there are a total of 60 raga compositions and this raga is the Thirty – sixth raga to appear in the series. The composition in this raga appear on a total of 17 pages from page numbers 859 to 875 and denoted under the Sri classification in Ragamala.

Raag Gond (ਗੋਂਡ) – Gond is an expression of triumph, however these feelings are balanced and in perspective ensuring that there is also an aspect of humility. Therefore, although there is a sense of knowing and understanding the achievement, there is not a feeling of becoming obsessed or getting lost in the achievement itself.

Gond was used by Guru Ram Das and Guru Arjan (29 hymns). The texts ask man to depend solely on the Lord for all benefits since it is He who has given him all his blessings.

The following represents the order of notes that can be used on the ascending and descending phase of the composition and the primary and secondary notes:

- Aroh: Sa Re Ga Ma, Pa Dha Ni Dha Ni Sa
- Avroh: Sa Ni Dha Ni Dha Pa, Ma Ga, Re Sa
- Pakar: Re Ga Ma, Pa Ma, Ma Pa Ni Dha Ni Dha Ni Sa, Ni Dha Ni Pa, Dha Ma
- Vadi: Sa
- Samvadi: Ma

== See also ==
- Kirtan
- Raga
- Taal
