= Akhbar Sri Darbar Sahib Sri Amritsar Ji =

Early Gurmukhi newspaper

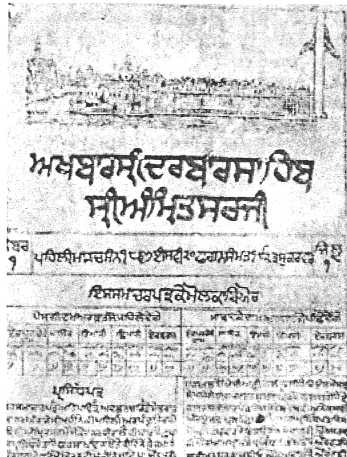
- Front page of the first issue, 1 March 1867
- Type: Fortnightly
- Editor: Munshi Hari Naryan
- General manager: Firaya Mal
- Founded: 1 March 1867
- Language: Braj written in Gurmukhi script
- City: Amritsar

The Akhbar Sri Darbar Sahib Sri Amritsar Ji, also known simply as Akhbar Sri Darbar Sahib, was a Braj-language fortnightly newspaper written in Gurmukhi script that was founded in Amritsar in 1867. It was one of the first Gurmukhi and Sikh newspapers. (Note: While many often claim it was the first Gurmukhi newspaper, this is incorrect as there was a Gurmukhi newspaper founded in 1854 to promote Christianity by missionaries of the Ludhiana Mission Press.)

== History ==
The newspaper was founded by two Hindu youths, Munshi Hari Narayan, who was the editor, and Firaya Mal, the manager. (Note: The names of the founders of the newspaper can be alternatively spelt or recorded as 'Munshi Hari Narain' and 'Phiraia Lal', respectively.) According to N. G. Barrier, the founders were Sehajdhari Sikhs and it was the first newspaper to appear in Punjabi. It was perhaps the second Sikh newspaper to be established in history, after the Aftab-i-Panjab of Diwan Buta Singh (established a year earlier in 1866).

The motivation to found the newspaper was to counter Christian missionaries. The published issues were four pages in-length on 20 by 26-inch paper. It was printed on lithographic limestone from a handwritten copy as a Gurmukhi type was not yet available in Amritsar at the time. The cost for the paper was two annas. An image of the Golden Temple shrine was in the masthead. The newspaper was written in Braj in Gurmukhi script rather than Punjabi in Gurmukhi script, which is a sign of the popularity of Braj in the region amongst Sikh intellectual circles in the 18th and 19th centuries. The matter of the paper was primarily translations of other papers. According to Vishav Bharti, whilst the newspaper had a Sikh-orientated name, it propagated Hinduism. It mostly reported on court notices and other government notifications. The newspaper carried advertisements from large commercial establishments. The newspaper reported on Sikh and national news events.

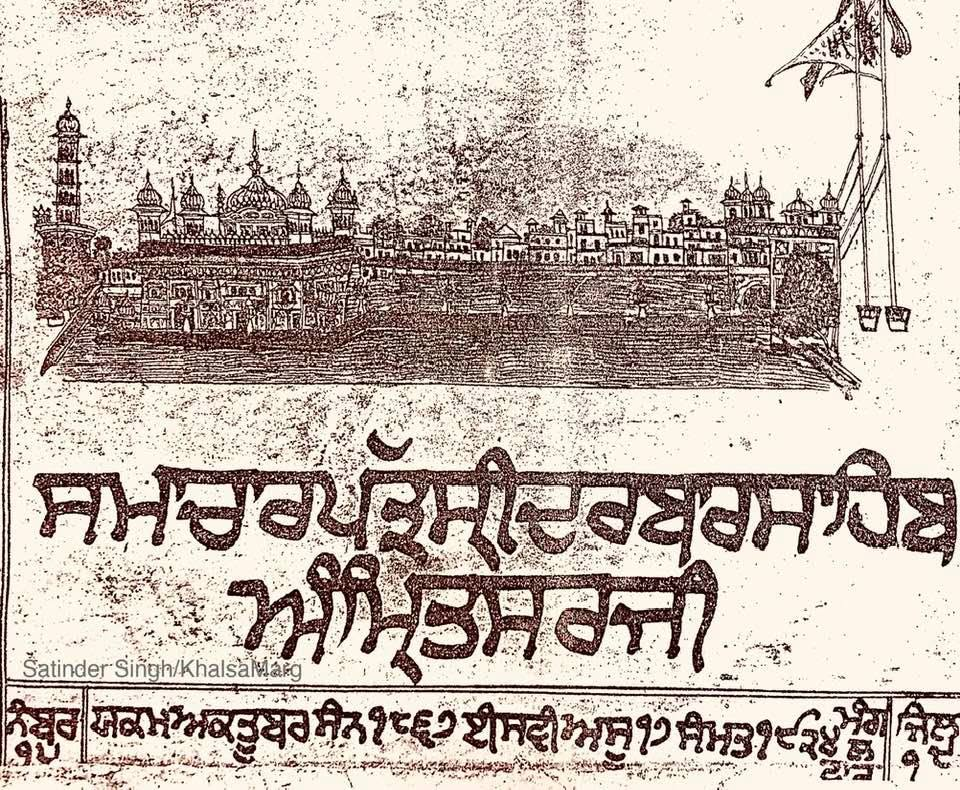
Detail of the front page of the 1 October 1867 issue

According to Narinder Singh Kapoor in Punjabi Patarkari Da Vikas, the newspaper was pro-establishment. One example for this is that it did not publish any content covering the Kuka uprisings against British-rule.

The newspaper did not remain in circulation for long after its founding and it ceased production. Most Gurmukhi newspapers that followed also met an early demise, until the longer-lasting Khalsa Akhbar came around in 1883.
