= Bihagara =

Hindustani raga

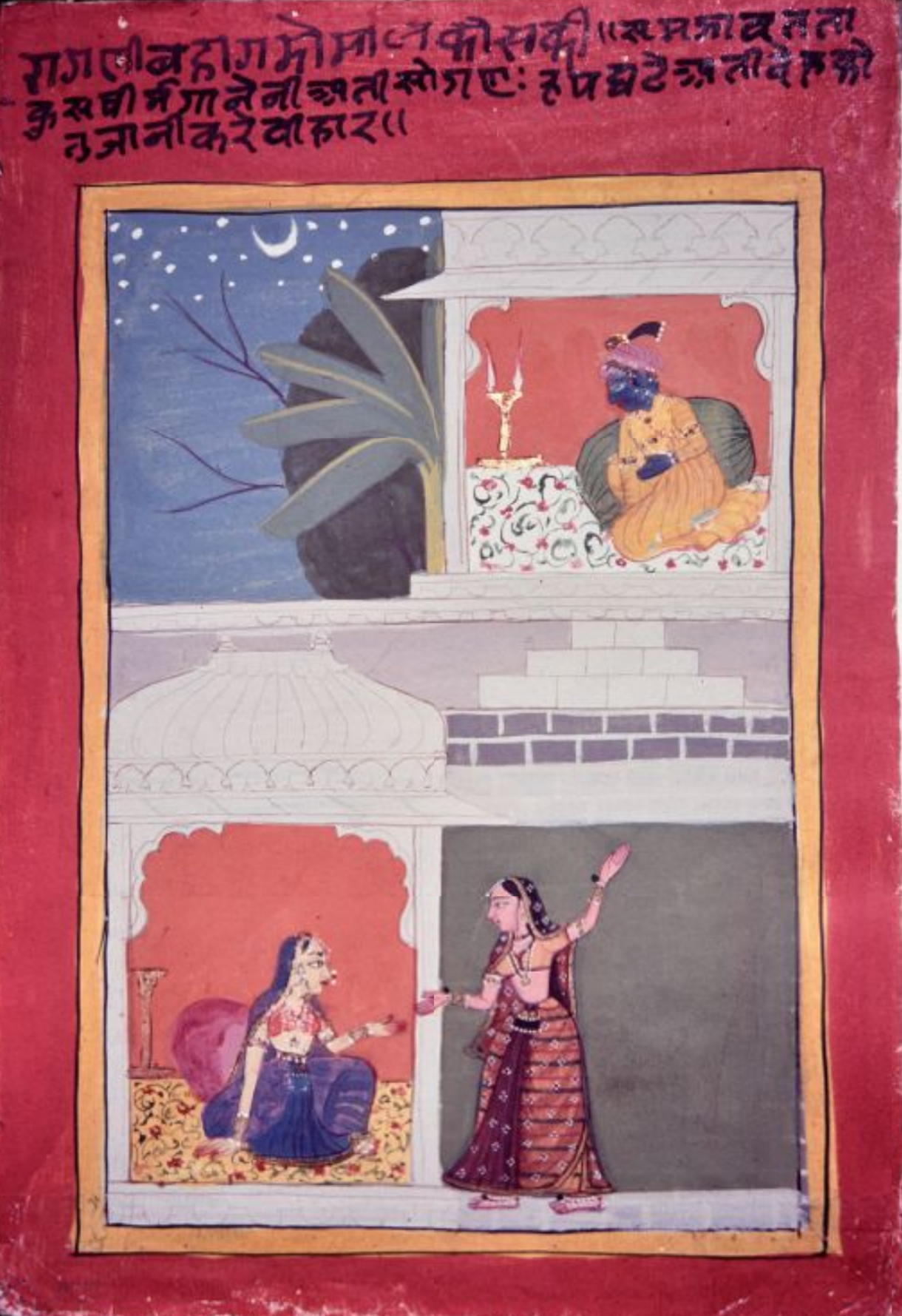
- Thaat: Bilaval
- Similar: Bihag

Bihagara is an Indian musical raga (composition) that appears in the Sikh tradition from northern India and is part of the Guru Granth Sahib. Every raga has a strict set of rules which govern the number of notes and their interplay that has to be adhered to for the composition of a tune. The Guru Granth Sahib consists of 60 ragas and this is the twenty-second raga to appear in the series. The composition in this raga appears from page 537 to 557.

The mood of Bihagara is that of extreme sadness and pain, which gives rise to the need to find peace and understanding. The heightened emotional state of sadness is only harnessed by the craving for truth and meaning.

Bihagara is not given in the Ragmala. Today it is classified under the Bilaval thata. Guru Ram Das, Guru Arjan and Guru Tegh Bahadar set a total of 17 Shabads (hymns), chants and a var to this raga.

The following represents the order of notes that can be used on the ascending and descending phase of the composition and the primary and secondary notes:

- Aroh: Ni Sa Ga Ma Pa Ni Sa
- Avroh: Sa Ni Dha Pa Ni Dha Pa Dha Ga Ma Ga Re Sa
- Vadi: Ma
- Samvadi: Sa

== See also ==
- Kirtan
- Raga
- Taal
