= Bairari =

Raga in the Sikh tradition

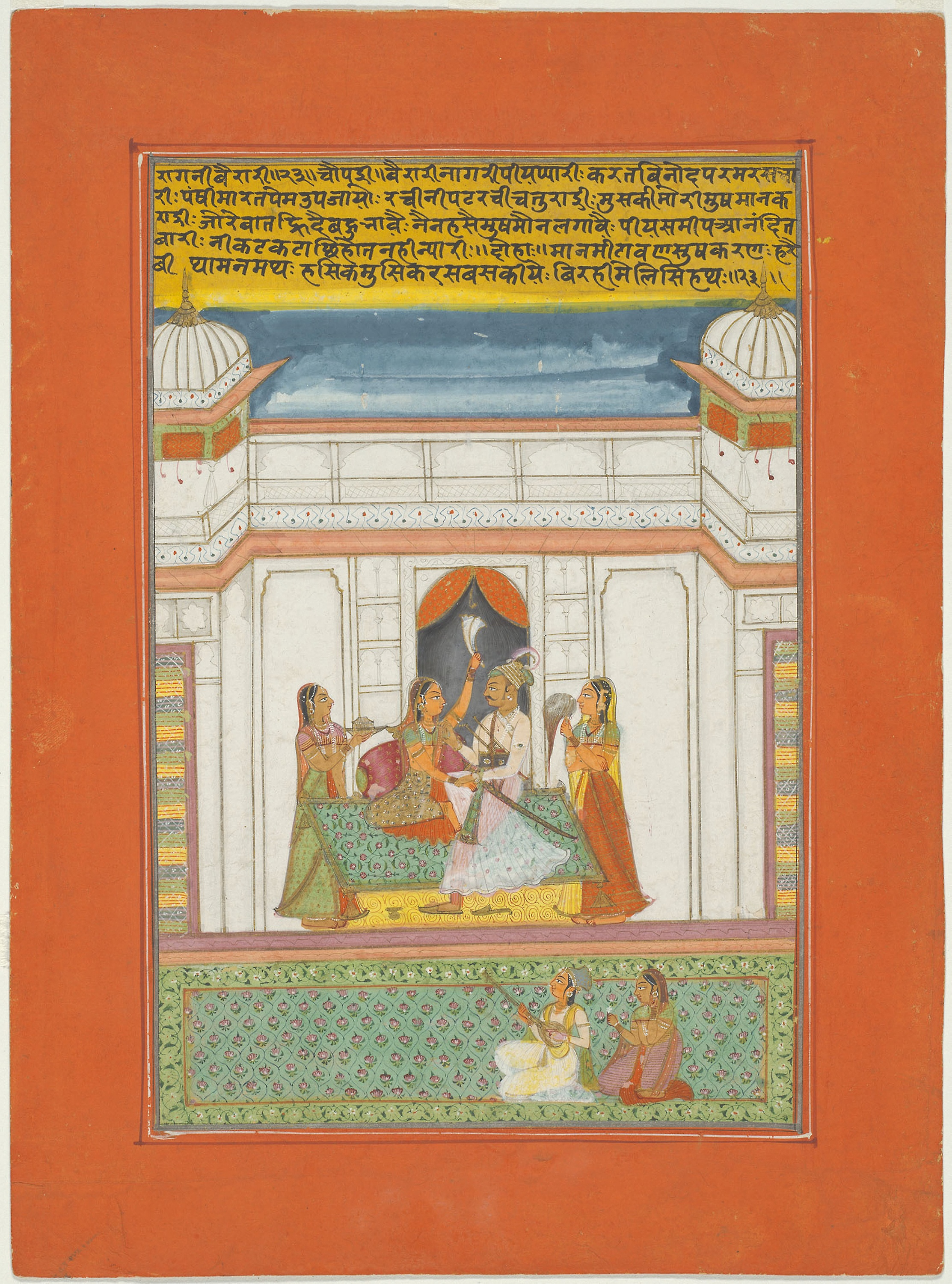
- Thaat: Marwa

This is an India musical raga (composition) that appears in the Sikh tradition from northern India and is part of the Sikh holy scripture called Sri Guru Granth Sahib or Guru Granth Sahib for short. Every raga has a strict set of rules which govern the number of notes that can be used; which notes can be used; and their interplay that has to be adhered to for the composition of a tune. In the Guru Granth Sahib, the Sikh holy Granth (book) there are a total of 31 raga compositions and this raga is the ninth raga to appear in the series. The composition in this raga appear on a total of only 2 pages from page numbers 719 to 721.

This raga appears in the Ragmala as the first ragini ("subset") of Sri raga. In the Mesakarna Ragmala (1509), which is almost the same as that of the Guru Granth Sahib, the first ragini of Siri Raga is given as Vairati. However, modern sources do not give Bairari nor Vairati but Barari and Varari as well as Varati are listed. Kaufmann believes that all of these names refer to the same raga, Barari. Whether this is the same as the old Bairari is open to question. The possibility always exists that Bairari was a regional tune. It was used by Guru Ram Das for six short hymns and by Guru Arjan for one. This raga is performed during the evening and it is currently assigned to the Marva thata ("set"). It resembles Purva Kalyan, the main difference being the use of Pa which is strong in Bairari and weak in Purva-Kalyan. Popley places Bairari in the same group as Sri Raga and this would agree with the Ragmala.

The following represents the order of notes that can be used on the ascending and descending phase of the composition and the primary and secondary notes:

- Aroh: Ni Re Ga Pa, M'a Ga, M'a Dha Sa
- Avroh: Sa Ni Dha P'a, M'a Ga, Pa Ga, Re Sa
- Vadi: Ga
- Samvadi: Dha

In the Guru Granth Sahib there are 2 pages dedicated to this raga from page 719 to 721.

== See also ==
- Kirtan
- Raga
- Taal
