= Salok Sahaskriti Mahalla Pehla =

Salok Sahaskriti Mehla Pehla (Pa: ਸਲੋਕ ਸਹਸਕ੍ਰਿਤੀ ਮਹਲਾ ੧) is collection of four verses written by Guru Nanak Dev which are present in Guru Granth Sahib, the holy book of Sikhs. The Salok is on page 1353 from line 6 to line 15. Sahaskriti couplets do not rhyme. These Salokas were composed in Varanasi while discourse with Hindu Pundit Gopal Das. The fifth Guru of Sikhism, Guru Arjun Dev also wrote Sahaskriti shalokas style known as Shalok Sehskritee Mehla Panjvan, which are detailed explanation of these shalokhas.

== Structure and language ==
These Salokas starts with Mool Mantar (The meanings of The One). Sahaskriti is a language used which is mixture of Pali, Sanskrit and Prakrit language. It is also called Gatha. Further more it can be called folk form of Sanskrit point towards ancient resources. In Gurbani due to different languages like Sahaskriti, Sudhakari, Braj, Punjabi makes linguistic Catholicism. This language was also used by Yogis for literature work.
