= Bihag =

Hindustani raga

- Thaat: Bilawal
- Type: Audav-Sampurna
- Time of day: night, 9-12
- Arohana: 'Ni Sa Ga Ma Pa Ni Sa'
- Avarohana: Sa' Ni (Dha) Pa Ma' Pa Ga Ma Ga Re Sa
- Pakad: 'Ni Sa Ga ma Pa Ma Pa Ga ma Ga Re Sa
- Chalan: Ga ma Pa Ni Dha Pa Ma Ga, Ga ma Ga Sa
- Vadi: Ga
- Samavadi: Ni
- Similar: Maru Bihag; Bihagara

Raga Bihag is a Hindustani classical raga (also spelled raag) belonging to the Bilawal thaat. Bihag uses all seven music swars, and both Madhyams (Shuddha and tivra) are used. The Shuddha Madhyam is more prominent; tivra Madhyama is only used with Panchama in the phrase PA MA' GA MA GA.

In Avarohana, Rishabh and Dhaivat are not used as resting notes, but they are used in meend. In this raga, Nishad is a prominent note, and alaps or taans are generally started from this note.

== Film songs ==
=== Language: Tamil ===
Song	Movie	Composer	Singer
Yaaradi Vanthaar	Vanambadi	K. V. Mahadevan	L. R. Eswari
Uruvathaikattidum Kanaadi	Saraswathi Sabatham	K. V. Mahadevan	P. Susheela
Kannethire Thondrinal	Iruvar Ullam	K. V. Mahadevan	T. M. Soundararajan
Chitthiram Pesuthadi	Sabaash Meena	T. G. Lingappa	T. M. Soundararajan
Paavadai Dhavaniyil	Nichaya Thaamboolam	Viswanathan–Ramamoorthy	T. M. Soundararajan
Oru Pennai Parthu	Dheiva Thaai	Viswanathan–Ramamoorthy	T. M. Soundararajan
Manithan Enbavan	Sumaithaangi	Viswanathan–Ramamoorthy	P. B. Sreenivas
Tamizhukku Amuthendru Per	Panchavarna Kili	Viswanathan–Ramamoorthy	P. Susheela
Aalaya Mainiyin	Palum Pazhamum	Viswanathan–Ramamoorthy	P. Susheela
Oru Naal Yaaro	Major Chandrakanth	V. Kumar	P. Susheela
Enthan Uyir Kadhalan Kannan Kannan	Kalyana Oorvalam	R.Parthasarathy	P. Susheela
Mohana Punnagai Orvalamey	Uravu Solla Oruvan	Vijaya Bhaskar	K. J. Yesudas
Aadi Velli	Moondru Mudichu	M. S. Viswanathan	P. Jayachandran, Vani Jairam
Kannilae Enna Undu	Aval Oru Thodar Kathai	M. S. Viswanathan	S. Janaki
Aval Oru Navarasa	Ulagam Sutrum Valiban	M. S. Viswanathan	S. P. Balasubrahmanyam
Hey Oraiyiram	Meendum Kokila	Ilaiyaraaja	S. P. Balasubrahmanyam
Un Paarvayil	Amman Kovil Kizhakale	Ilaiyaraaja	K. J. Yesudas, K.S. Chitra
Veenai Meetum Kaigaley	Vazha Ninaithal Vazhalam	Ilaiyaraaja	S. Janaki
Inimel Naalum	Iravu Pookkal	Ilaiyaraaja	S. Janaki
Thaimatham Kalyanam	Thambikku Oru Paattu	Ilaiyaraaja	P. Jayachandran, Swarnalatha
Ullasa Poongatre	Kolangal	Ilaiyaraaja	K.S. Chitra
Kannai Padithaen	Ponnar Shankar	Ilaiyaraaja	Sriram Parthasarathy, Shreya Ghoshal
Unnai Ethanai Murai Parthalum	Neeya?	Shankar–Ganesh	S. P. Balasubrahmanyam, P. Susheela
Azhage Azhugai Enna	Vairagyam	Manoj–Gyan	S. P. Balasubrahmanyam, S. Janaki
Suttum Vizhi	Kandukondain Kandukondain	A. R. Rahman	Hariharan
Malargal Kaettaen	O Kadhal Kanmani	A. R. Rahman	K.S. Chitra, A. R. Rahman, Sajith
Chotta Chotta	Taj Mahal	A. R. Rahman	Srinivas, Sujatha Mohan
Mudhal Murai Killi Parthen	Sangamam	A. R. Rahman	Srinivas, Sujatha Mohan
Yaro Yarodi	Alai Payuthey	A. R. Rahman	Mahalakshmi Iyer, Vaishali Samant, Richa Sharma
Valayapatti Thavile (Ragamalika:Bihag, Bageshri, Neelambari)	Azhagiya Tamil Magan	A. R. Rahman	Naresh Iyer, Ujjayinee Roy, Srimathumitha, Darshana KT
Kalvare	Raavanan	A. R. Rahman	Shreya Ghoshal
Malavika Malavika	Unnai Thedi	Deva	Hariharan, K.S. Chitra
Nilladi Endradhu(Ragam Desh touches also)	Kaalamellam Kaathiruppen	Deva	S. P. Balasubrahmanyam, K. S. Chithra
Itho Intha Nenjodu	Good Luck	Manoj Bhatnaghar	S. P. Balasubrahmanyam, K. S. Chithra
Athi Athikka	Aathi	Vidyasagar	S. P. Balasubrahmanyam, Sadhana Sargam
Vizhiyil Un Vizhiyil	Kireedam	G. V. Prakash Kumar	Sonu Nigam, Swetha Mohan
Kannum Kannum Pesa Pesa(Maand touches also)	Thalaivii	G. V. Prakash Kumar	Saindhavi
Kadhalaam Kadavul Mun (MaruBihag Raga)	Uttama Villain	Ghibran	Padmalatha
Kowsalya Kalyana	Thulli Thirintha Kaalam	Jayanth	Harini, Baby Deepika
Engirindhu Vandhayada	Five Star	Sriram Parasuram, Anuradha Sriram	Chandana Bala
Dil Mera Loot Liya	Azhagiya Theeye	Ramesh Vinayakam	Srinivas, Mathangi
Sandana Poongatrae	Azhagiya Theeye	Ramesh Vinayakam	Lavanya, Ramesh Vinayakam

Language : Hindi

Song	Movie	Composer	Artists
Tere Sur Aur Mere Geet	Goonj Uthi Shehnai	Vasant Desai	Lata Mangeshkar & Mohammed Rafi
Boliye Surili Boliyan	Griha Pravesh	Kanu Roy	Bhupinder Singh (musician) & Sulakshana Pandit
Banke Chakori Gori Jhum Jhum Nachegi	Hum Matwale Naujahan	Chitragupt (composer)	Mukesh (singer)
Koi Gata Main So Jata	Alaap	Jaidev	K. J. Yesudas
Ai Dil Beqarar Kyun	Shahjehan	Naushad	K. L. Saigal
Chalenge Tir Jab Dil Par	Kohinoor (1960 film)	Naushad	Lata Mangeshkar & Mohammed Rafi
Hamare Dil Se Na Jana	Uran Khatola (film)	Naushad	Lata Mangeshkar
Meri Ladli Re Meri Ladli	Andaz (1949 film)	Naushad	Lata Mangeshkar & Chorus
Tere Pyar Mein Dildar	Mere Mehboob	Naushad	Lata Mangeshkar
Yeh Kya Jagah Hai Doston	Umrao Jaan (1981 film)	Mohammed Zahur Khayyam	Asha Bhosle
Zindagi Ke Safar Men Guzar Jate Hain Jo Makam	Aap Ki Kasam	R. D. Burman	Kishore Kumar
Piya Bawri Piya Bawri	Khubsoorat	R. D. Burman	Asha Bhosle & Ashok Kumar
Laal ishq	Goliyon Ki Raasleela Ram- Leela	Sanjay Leela Bhansali	Arijit Singh

=== Language: Kannada ===
Song	Movie	Composer	Artists
Karedaru Kelade	Sanaadi Appanna	G. K. Venkatesh	S. Janaki, Bismillah Khan
