= Guru Granth Sahib =

Primary scripture of Sikhism

Guru Granth Sahib ਗੁਰੂ ਗ੍ਰੰਥ ਸਾਹਿਬ
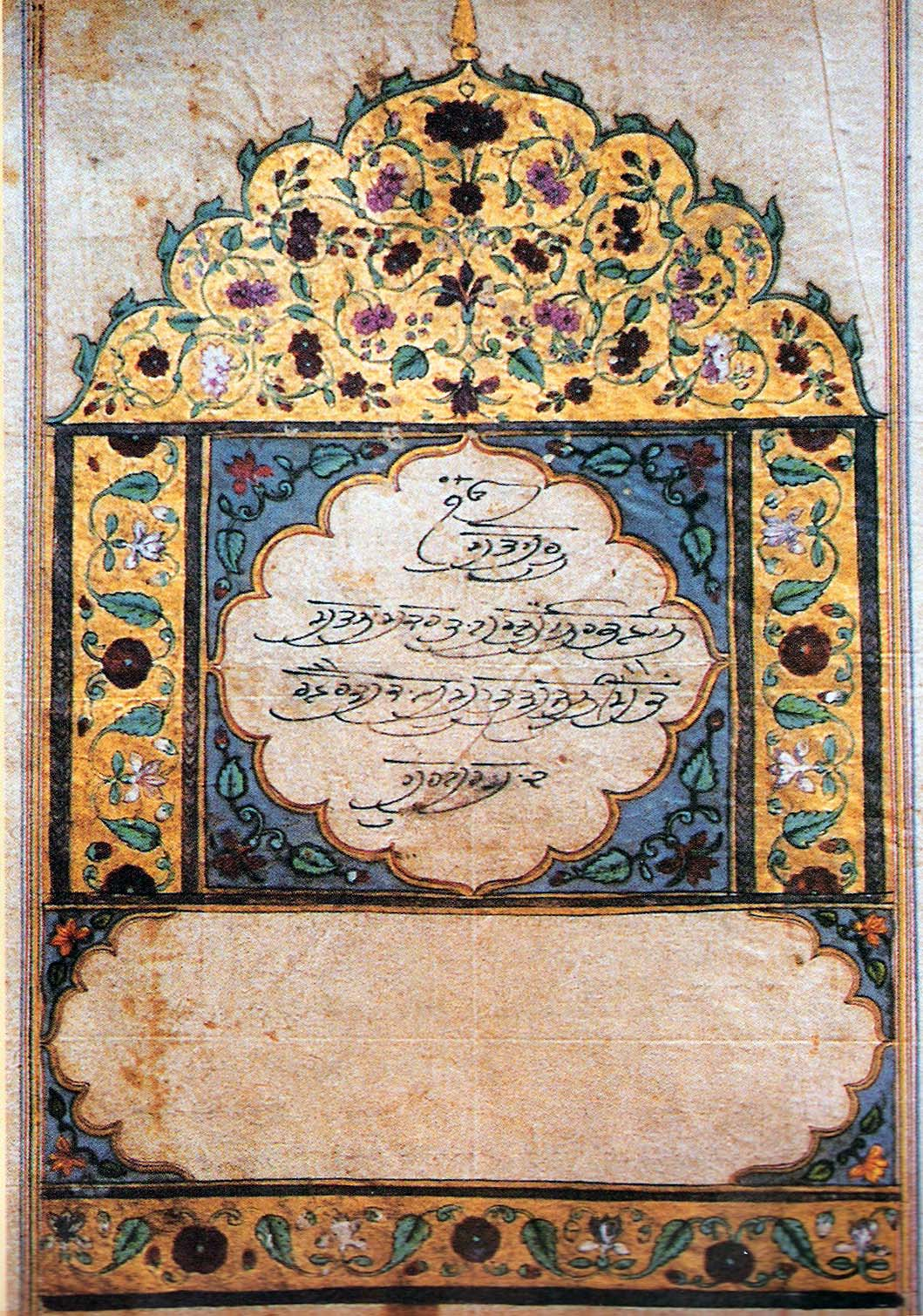
- Illuminated Guru Granth Sahib folio with nisan (Mul Mantar) in the penmanship of Guru Gobind Singh

Information
- Religion: Sikhism
- Language: Sant Bhasha (Punjabi and its dialects, Lahnda, regional Prakrits, Apabhramsa, Sanskrit, Hindustani languages (Brajbhasha, Bangru, Awadhi, Old Hindi, Deccani), Bhojpuri, Sindhi, Marathi, Marwari, Bengali, Persian and Arabic)

The Guru Granth Sahib (Punjabi: ਗੁਰੂ ਗ੍ਰੰਥ ਸਾਹਿਬ, pronounced [ɡʊɾuː ɡɾənt̪ʰᵊ säː(ɦ)(ɪ)bᵊ(˦)]) is the central holy religious scripture of Sikhism, regarded by Sikhs as the final, sovereign, and eternal Guru following the lineage of the ten human gurus of the religion.

The Adi Granth (Punjabi: ਆਦਿ ਗ੍ਰੰਥ), its first rendition, was compiled by the fifth guru, Guru Arjan (1564–1606). Its compilation was completed on 29 August 1604 and first installed inside the Golden Temple in Amritsar on 1 September 1604. Baba Buddha was appointed the first Granthi of the Golden Temple. Later, Guru Gobind Singh, the tenth Sikh guru, added hymns of Guru Tegh Bahadur to the Adi Granth and affirmed the text as his successor on 6 October 1708. This second rendition became known as the Guru Granth Sahib and is also sometimes referred to as the Adi Granth.

The text consists of 1,430 angs (pages) and 5,894 shabads (line compositions), which are poetically rendered and set to a rhythmic ancient north Indian classical form of music. The bulk of the scripture is divided into 31 main rāgas, with each Granth rāga subdivided according to length and author. The hymns in the scripture are arranged primarily by the rāgas in which they are read. The Guru Granth Sahib is written in the Gurmukhi script in various languages including Punjabi, Lahnda, regional Prakrits, Apabhramsa, Sanskrit, Hindi languages (Braj Bhasha, Bangru, Awadhi, Old Hindi), Bhojpuri, Sindhi, Marathi, Marwari, Bengali, Persian and Arabic. Copies in these languages often have the generic title of Sant Bhasha.

The Guru Granth Sahib was composed predominantly by six Sikh gurus: Guru Nanak, Guru Angad, Guru Amar Das, Guru Ram Das, Guru Arjan and Guru Tegh Bahadur. It also contains the traditions and teachings of fourteen Hindu Bhakti movement sants (saints), such as Ramananda, Kabir and Namdev among others, and one Muslim Sufi saint: Sheikh Farid.

The vision in the Guru Granth Sahib is of a society based on divine freedom, mercy, love, and justice without oppression of any kind. While the Granth acknowledges and respects the scriptures of Hinduism and Islam, it does not imply a moral reconciliation with either of these religions. It is installed in a Sikh gurdwara (temple). A Sikh typically prostrates before it on entering such a temple. The Granth is revered as eternal gurbānī and the spiritual authority in Sikhism.

== Nomenclature ==
The main name for the Sikh scripture is Guru Granth Sahib. Precursory names for it were Pothi Sahib and Adi Granth. Another variation is Ād Granth. Due to Sikhs considering their scripture to be a "Living Guru", its pages are referred to as an ang (meaning "limb").

== History ==
=== Overview ===
During the Kartarpur chapter of Guru Nanak's life, his compositions were seen as a source of wisdom and compiled in the form of a book, known as a pothī. This collection would later be passed onto Nanak's successor Guru Angad, with him and the later gurus expanding upon the Sikh scriptural corpus by adding their own works and that of others in-line with Sikh theology. The major expansions on the Sikh religious collection occurred in around 1570, 1604, 1675, and the 1690s, finally assuming a canonical format.

=== Guru period ===
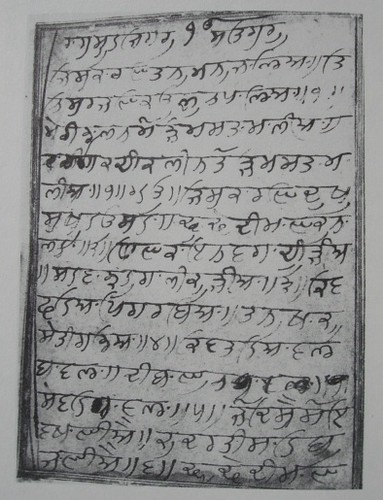
Folio from the Jalandhar recension of the Goindwal Pothi, dated to the late 16th century

Guru Nanak composed hymns, which were sung by his followers in rāga set to music. His successor, Guru Angad, opened centers and distributed these hymns. The community would sing the hymns and his agents collected donations. This tradition was continued by the third and fourth gurus as well. The fifth guru, Guru Arjan, discovered that Prithi Chand – his eldest brother and a competing claimant to the Sikh guruship – had a copy of an earlier pothi (palm-leaf manuscript) with hymns and was distributing hymns of the earlier gurus along with his own of hymns. Guru Arjan considered these as spurious and became concerned about establishing an authentic anthology of approved hymns.

Guru Arjan began compiling an officially approved version of the sacred scripture for the Sikh community. He sent his associates across the Indian subcontinent to collect the circulating hymns of Sikh gurus and convinced Mohan, the son of Guru Amar Das, to give him the collection of the religious writings of the first three gurus in a humble manner by singing the hymns registered in Guru Granth Sahib, 248.

O Mohan, your temple is so lofty, and your mansion is unsurpassed. O Mohan, your gates are so beautiful. They are the worship-houses of the Saints.

— Sri Guru Granth Sahib page 248 Full Shabad

As his associates returned with their collections, Guru Arjan selected and edited the hymns for inclusion in the Adi Granth with Bhai Gurdas as his scribe. (Note: According to Khushwant Singh, while the manuscript was being put together, Akbar – the Mughal Emperor, received a report that the Adi Granth contained passages vilifying Islam. Therefore, he asked to inspect it. Baba Buddha and Bhai Gurdas brought him a copy of the manuscript and read a few hymns from it. Akbar decided that this report had been false and donated 51 gold mohurs to the manuscript effort. However, this support for the Sikh scripture and Sikhism was short-lived once Akbar died, with Jehangir calling Sikhism as a "false traffic". Under his orders, Guru Arjan, who compiled the first edition of the Sikh scripture, was tortured and executed.) This effort yielded several drafts and manuscripts, some of which have survived into the modern era.

The oldest surviving manuscript version of the Adi Granth is the Guru Nanak Dev University Manuscript 1245, which has been dated to c. 1599. Other early editions of the Adi Granth with some variations include the Bahoval pothi (c. 1600), Vanjara pothi (c. 1601) and Bhai Rupa pothi (c. 1603).

Another early variant manuscript is called the Guru Harsahai pothi, preserved by Sodhis and is believed to be the one that existed before Guru Arjan's compilation and one he gave to his eldest brother Prithi Chand. It was initially installed in Amritsar, then was moved in the 18th-century and preserved in Guru Harsahai (35 kilometers west of Faridkot, Punjab) till 1969, when the state government requested it be displayed for the 500 years celebrations. It was moved for the first time in over 200 years and briefly displayed in Patiala for the event. Thereafter, the Sodhis consented to transfers. In 1970, however, during another such transfer, this early version of the Adi Granth manuscript was stolen. However, photos of some pages have survived.

This manuscript is claimed by the Sodhis to be the oldest and one written in part by Guru Nanak. However, this claim is first observed only much later, in texts attributed to the 17th-century Hariji, the grandson of Prithi Chand. Based on the evidence in the surviving photos, it is unlikely that Guru Nanak wrote or maintained a pothi. The features in its Gurmukhi script and the language suggest that the hymns are significantly older, and that the pre-canonical hymns were being written down in early Sikhism and preserved by the Sikh Gurus prior to the editing by Guru Arjan. The existence of Guru Harsahai manuscript attests to the early tradition of Sikh scripture, its existence in variant forms and a competition of ideas on its contents including the Mul Mantar.

Many minor variations, and three significant Adi Granth recensions, are known; these provide insights into how the Sikh scripture was compiled, edited and revised over time. There is a fourth significant version called the Lahori bir, but it primarily differs in how the hymns are arranged and the final pages of the Adi Granth. (Note: Another controversy has been the discovery of two blank folios in the Kartarpur manuscript (near page 703) and why the Ramakali hymn on that page is just two opening lines. In contrast to the Kartarpur manuscript, the Banno manuscript of Adi Granth, discovered in Kanpur and dated to 1644, is identical in all respects but it has no blank pages and on the folio pages near 703 is a complete hymn. The Banno bir has been controversial because it includes many Hindu rites-of-passage (sanskara) in that version of the Adi Granth. According to W.H. McLeod, the difference in the two versions can be because of three possibilities, from which he withholds judgment: first, Guru Arjan deliberately left the blank folio pages to complete it later, but was unable to because he was arrested and executed by the Mughal emperor Jehangir; second, the hymn and pages existed in the original manuscript, the Banno bir is older, the pages were removed by Khalsa Sikhs from the Kartarpur manuscript and replaced with blank folios in their attempt to carve out a separate Sikh identity from the Hindus during the Singh Sabha Movement; third, the blank pages were intentionally left by Guru Arjan for unknown reasons, and the complete hymn in the Banno bir is an interpolation added by a Sikh follower who wanted to insert Brahminical rites-of-passage rituals in the text. According to G.B. Singh – a Sikh scholar who pioneered study of the early Sikh manuscripts, the evidence supports the second theory. According to Pashaura Singh, his examination of the manuscripts and linguistic evidence yields support for the third theory, noting that the smaller hand and different writing implement in which the remaining 22 lines were written, the lines themselves do not match earlier manuscripts and differ in structure and lexicon from the rest of Guru Arjan's writings, the presence of other short verses in all manuscripts like Vār Basant with only three stanzas, and points to the fact that G.B. Singh had made the claim without actually examining the text, positing that he seemed to have been serving the interests of the Arya Samaj based on his writings.)

After Guru Gobind Singh and his followers evacuated Anandpur Sahib in 1704 due to Mughal and Pahari opposition, they left behind a corpus of literature, including manuscripts of the Ād Granth. Many of these manuscripts of the scripture were looted by the Pahari Rajas during their invasion of Anandpur. At-least some of these looted manuscripts made their way back into Sikh possession with purchases by the later Sikh-ruled polities, such as the Sikh Empire and the kingdom of Patiala.

While Guru Gobind Singh was in Nanded in the Deccan, he suffered a fatal injury and died on 6 October 1708. Shortly before his death, he proclaimed that the Ād Granth be the guru to succeed him, ending the tradition of a living (dehdhari) guruship, with the scripture being proclaimed the new guru for eternity. Sectoral groups after the death of Guru Gobind Singh attempted to continue the guruship in the form of a physical human but they were sidelined by the main faction, led by Mata Sundari and Bhai Mani Singh, whom supported Guru Gobind Singh's wish for the scripture to be the eternal-guru. Bhai Nand Lal also wrote supporting the Guru Granth tradition.

=== Editions ===
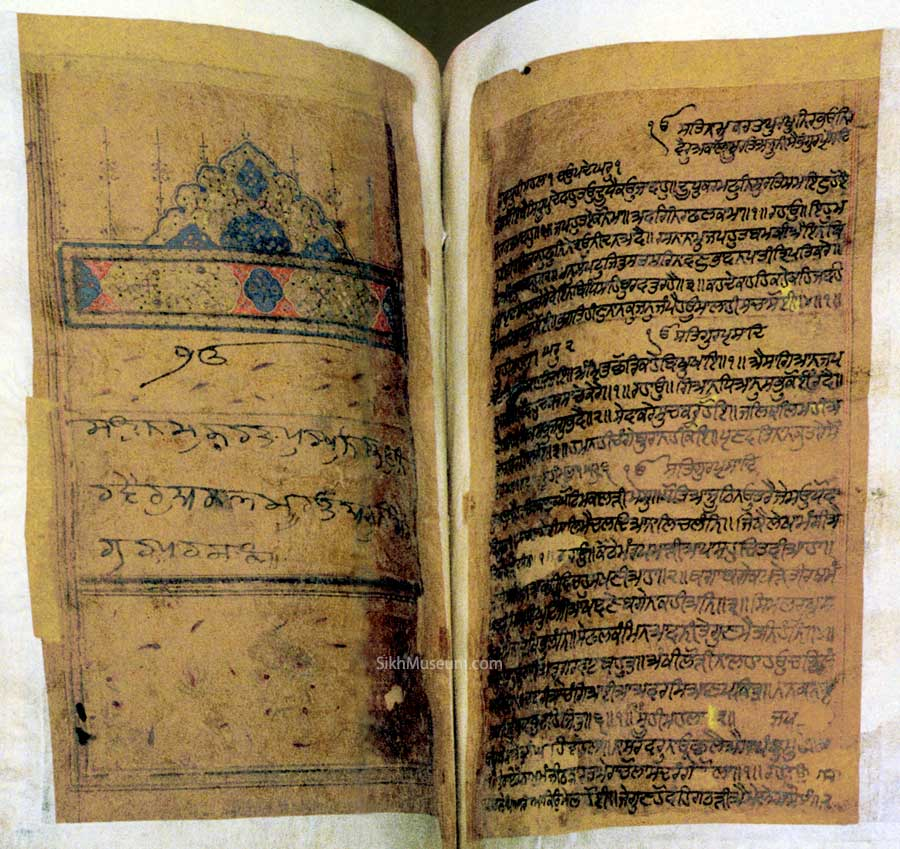
Photograph of the Kartarpur Bir kept at Kartarpur. This is the manuscript that was said to have been completed by Guru Arjan and his scribe, Bhai Gurdas, in 1604 and installed in the Golden Temple

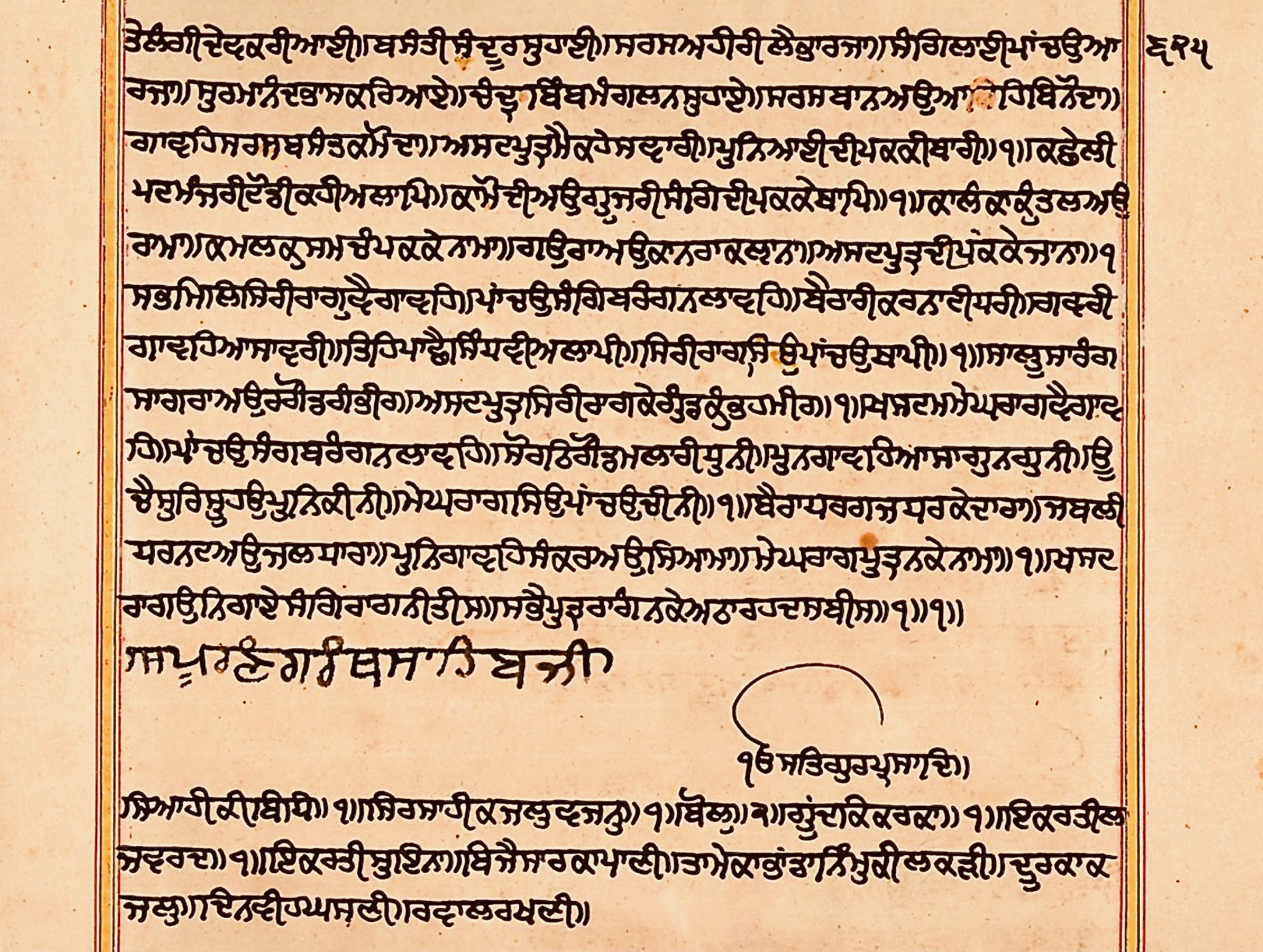
A folio from an early 19th-century manuscript copy of the Guru Granth Sahib (Schoyen Collection Norway)

In 1604, the first edition of the Sikh scripture, Adi Granth, was complete and officially approved by Guru Arjan. It was installed at the Golden Temple, with Baba Buddha as the first granthi or reader. No hymns were added by Guru Hargobind, Guru Har Rai and Guru Har Krishan. In the Sikh tradition, Guru Hargobind is credited for adding the rāga tunes for nine out of 22 Vars. The hymns of IX Guru Tegh Bahadur, after his beheading in Delhi, were added to the scripture by his son and successor Guru Gobind Singh. Even before the installation of the scripture to guruship, the scripture was revered and respected by the Sikhs. When it was first installed in the Darbar Sahib in Amritsar in 1604 on a manji (cot) on a canopied, high pedestal with a fly-whisk attendant (chowri), Guru Arjan bowed to the work and sat at a level lower than it. Thus, the scripture was treated in the same respect as the guru even before its guruship proclamation by Guru Gobind Singh.

In 1704 at Damdama Sahib, during a one-year respite from the heavy fighting with the Mughal Emperor Aurangzeb, Guru Gobind Singh and Bhai Mani Singh added the religious compositions of Guru Tegh Bahadur to the Adi Granth to create the final edition, called the Guru Granth Sahib. Prior to Guru Gobind Singh, three versions of the Adi Granth pothi with minor variations were in circulation at Sikh shrines across the Indian subcontinent. In addition, several unauthorized versions were in circulation, issued by sects founded by one of the sons or relatives of earlier Sikh Gurus such as Prithi Chand, Guru Arjan's elder brother. Guru Gobind Singh issued the definitive final edition that included the hymns of his father, and closed the canon. This manuscript is called the Damdama bir, and a 1707 rare copy of this manuscript is now preserved at the Toshakhana in Nanded, Maharashtra.

The compositions of Guru Gobind Singh were not included in the Guru Granth Sahib and set into the Dasven Padsah ka Granth, which is more popularly known as the Dasam Granth. The compilation and release of this definitive edition of the latter was completed by Bhai Mani Singh.

=== Contributors ===
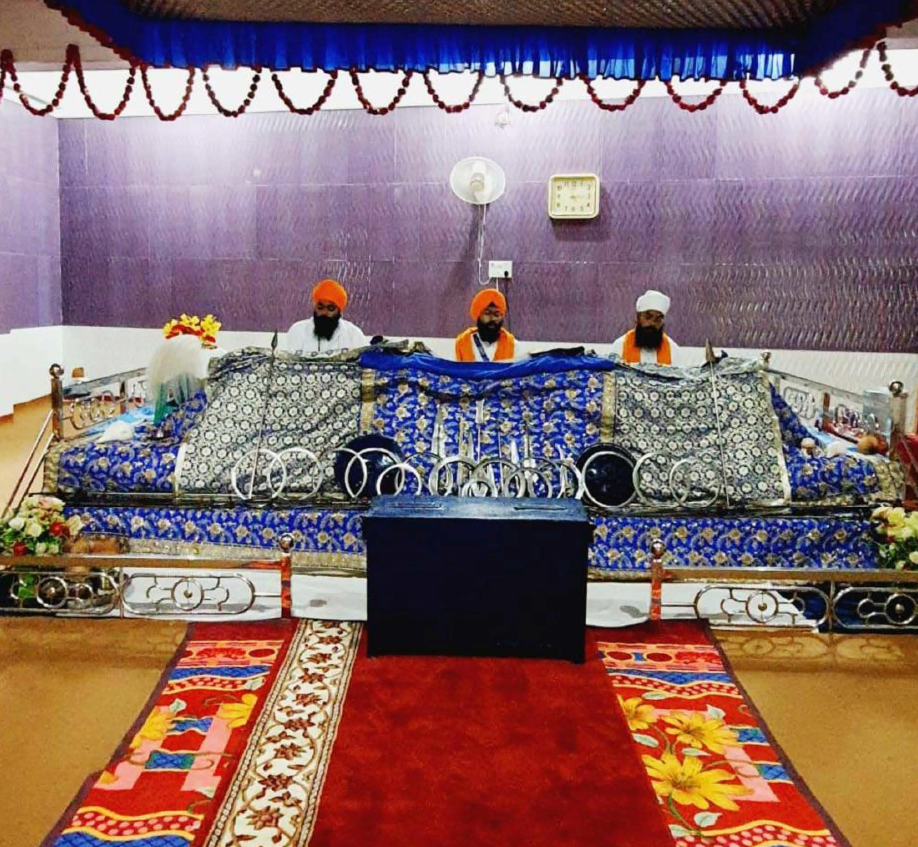
3 principal Sikh Granths (Adi - Dasam - Sarbloh) placed together being recited, Nanded, Maharashtra

Number of hymns contributed to the Guru Granth Sahib
1. Guru Nanak (16.5%)
2. Guru Angad (1.10%)
3. Guru Amar Das (15.4%)
4. Guru Ram Das (11.5%)
5. Guru Arjan (32.6%)
6. 0.00%
7. 0.00%
8. Guru Tegh Bahadur (5.92%)
9. Other (16.9%)

The Guru Granth Sahib contains predominantly hymns of the following Sikh Gurus: Guru Nanak, Guru Angad, Guru Amar Das, Guru Ram Das, Guru Arjan and Guru Teg Bahadur. Whilst these six gurus are widely accepted as having their writings included in the Guru Granth Sahib, there are some who argue compositions of Guru Har Rai and Guru Gobind Singh are also included. A Salok Mahalla Satvan (7) and Dohra Mahalla Dasvan (10) have been attributed by some to the seventh and tenth gurus, respectively. It also contains hymns and verses of thirteen Hindu Bhakti movement sant poets (saints) and two Muslim saint poets. There are also idolatry verses for the Gurus such as Guru Nanak fused into some pages, those composed by bards (Bhatts). The hymns and verses are different lengths, some very long, others being just a few line verses. Twenty-two of the thirty-one ragas contain the contributions of bhagats. The following is a list of contributors whose hymns are present in the Guru Granth Sahib as well as the number of hymns they contributed:

Sikh Gurus:
- Guru Nanak Dev (974)
- Guru Angad Dev (62)
- Guru Amar Das (907)
- Guru Ram Das (679)
- Guru Arjan Dev (2218)
- Guru Tegh Bahadur (116)

Bhagats:

- Bhagat Kabir (541)
- Bhagat Jayadeva (2)
- Bhagat Ramanand (1)
- Bhagat Namdev (60)
- Bhagat Trilochan (5)
- Bhagat Parmanand (1)
- Bhagat Pipa (1)
- Bhagat Sain (1)
- Bhagat Surdas (1)
- Bhagat Ravidas (41)
- Baba Sundar (6)
- Balvand Rai (1)

Bhatts:

- Bhatt Balh (1)
- Bhatt Bhalh (5)
- Bhatt Bhika (2)
- Bhatt Gayand (13)
- Bhatt Harbans (2)
- Bhatt Jalap (5)
- Bhatt Kirat (8)
- Bhatt Kalshar (54)
- Bhatt Mathura (14)
- Bhatt Nalh (16)
- Bhatt Salh (3)

Pirs:

- Bhagat Farid (134)
- Bhagat Bhikhan (2)
- Bhagat Beni (3)
- Bhagat Sadhana (1)
- Bhagat Dhanna (4)

Gursikhs:

- Bhai Satta (4)
- Balvand Rai (8)
- Bhai Mardana (12)
- Baba Sunder (10)
- Bhai Piara (53)

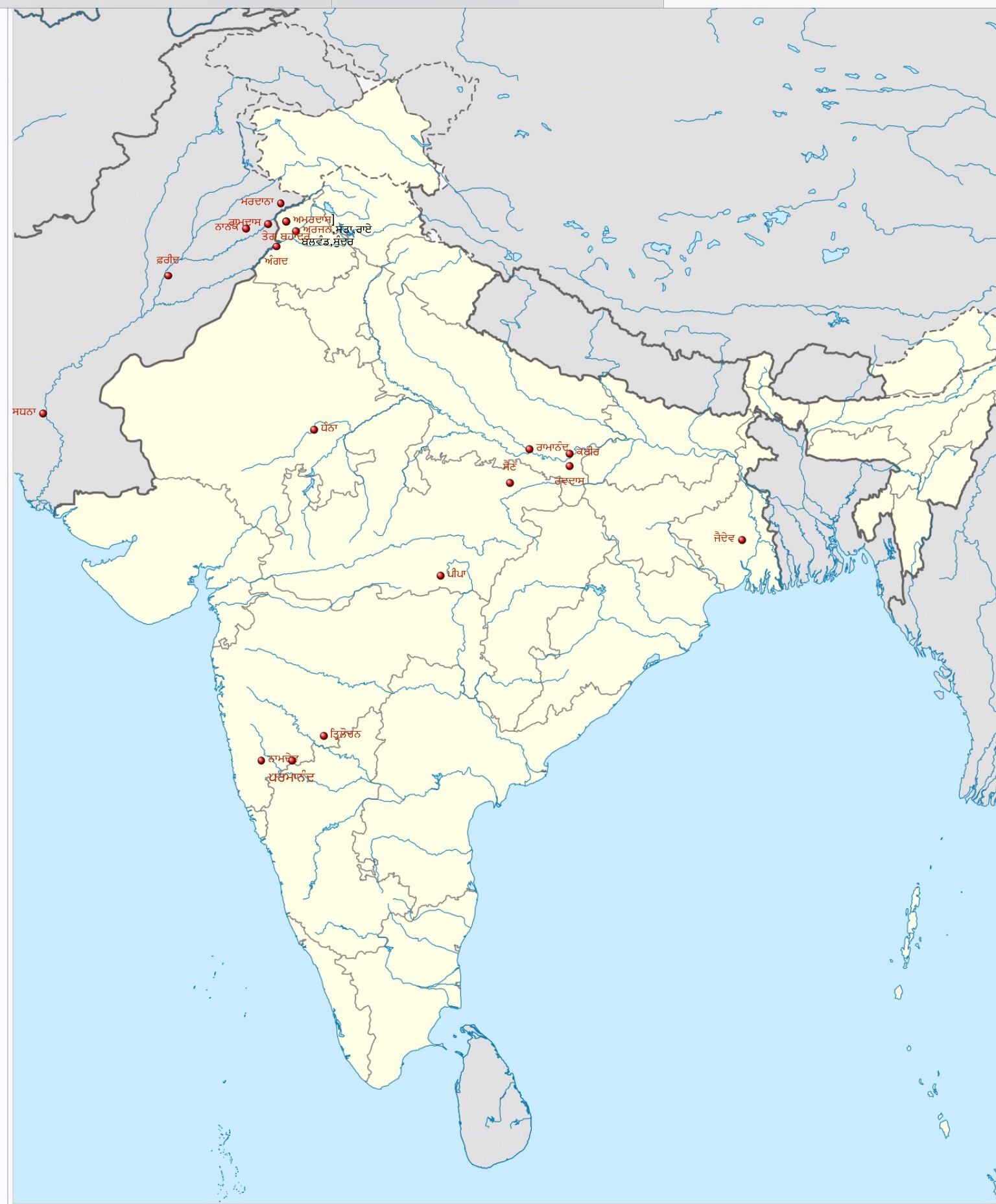
Map showing birthplace of various contributors of Guru Granth Sahib

=== Manuscript versions ===
In the 19th and 20th-century, several manuscript versions of the Adi Granth and the Guru Granth Sahib hymns were discovered. This triggered contesting theories about authenticity and how the canonical text of Sikhism evolved over time. There are five views:

- The first view held by scholars such as Balwant Singh Dhillon states that there was a consistent "mother tradition", where the hymns of Guru Nanak were carefully preserved as a single codex without any corruption or unauthorized changes, to which the later Gurus added additional hymns. The Sikh scripture developed in linear, pure form becoming first the Adi Granth and finally the closed version of the Guru Granth Sahib. According to this view, there was no pre-canonical diversity, the scripture developed in an organized and disciplined format, and it denies the existence of alternate hymns and texts that were cherished by Sikhs of an earlier era.
- The second view held by scholars such as Gurinder Singh Mann states that the scripture started from a single process, proceeded linearly, then diversified into separate textual traditions with some variations, over time. This school of scholars supports their theory by highlighting the similarities of the manuscripts and close match particularly between the three manuscripts called the Guru Har Sahai MS, the Govindval MS, and the Guru Nanak Dev University MS 1245. This theory is weakened by variations observed in 27 manuscript variants now dated between 1642 and 1692. The alternate formulation of this theory states that two branches developed over time, with the Peshawar pothi and Kartarpur pothi being the two branches.
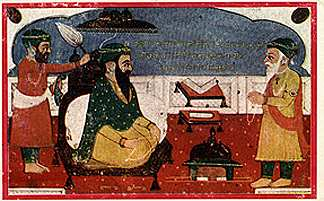
- Bhai Banno (right) being given the Adi Granth by Guru Arjan (centre-left) to get it bound
  The third view held by scholars such as Piar Singh states that independent versions of the Sikh scripture developed in geographically distant regions of the Indian subcontinent. These versions developed because of the forgetfulness or creativity of the local Sikh leaders, errors made by scribes, attempts to adopt popular hymns of bhagats or adapt the hymns to local regional languages where Gurmukhi was not understood. It is these manuscripts that Guru Arjan collected and considered, then edited to produce an approved version of the Adi Granth. The Sikh scripture, according to this school, was thus a collaborative effort and there was no authentic version of the pre-canonical text in Sikhism.
- The fourth view builds upon this third view and is supported by scholars such as Jeevan Deol. According to this view, there were independent textual traditions in Sikhism before Guru Arjan decided to edit and redact them into the Adi Granth. These textual traditions developed in different parts of the Indian subcontinent, greatly influenced by the popularity of regional bhagats and their Bhakti movement ideas about nirguna and saguna forms of the divine, with Guru Arjan favoring the nirgun versions. The Adi Granth reflects the review, editing and compilation of complex and diverse textual traditions before him.
- The fifth view held by scholars such as Pashaura Singh develops and refines the fourth view. It states that the Sikh scripture emerged from a collaborative effort of Guru Arjan and his trusted associates, particularly Bhai Gurdas and Jagana Brahmin of Agra. His collaborators were his devout admirers, well versed in the Sikh thought, Sanskrit traditions and philosophical schools of Indian religions. The variant manuscripts support this theory, as does the handwriting analysis of the Kartarpur bir (manuscript) allegedly approved by Guru Arjan which shows at least four distinct scribal styles. The variations in the manuscripts also affirm that the Adi Granth did not develop in a linear way, i.e. it was not simply copied from a previous version.

== Composition ==
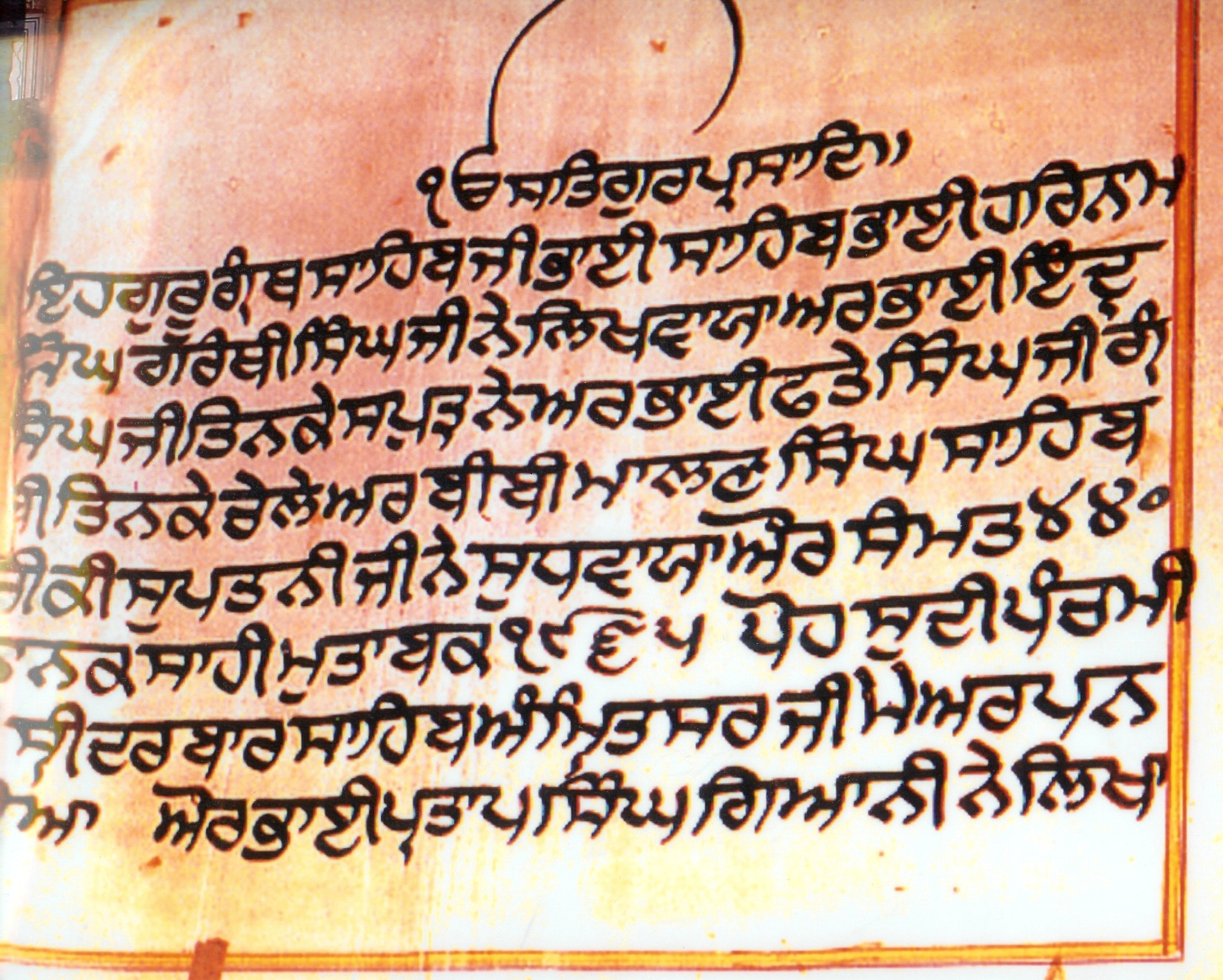
The end part of the handwritten Adi Granth by Pratap Singh Giani on the first floor of the Golden Temple

The entire Guru Granth Sahib is written in the Gurmukhi script, which was standardized by Guru Angad in the 16th century. According to Sikh tradition and the Mahman Prakash, an early Sikh manuscript, Guru Angad Dev had taught and spread Gurmukhi at the suggestion of Guru Nanak Dev who invented the Gurmukhi script. The word Gurmukhī translates to "from the mouth of the guru". It descended from the Laṇḍā scripts and was used from the outset for compiling Sikh scriptures. The Sikhs assign a high degree of sanctity to the Gurmukhī script. It is the official script for writing Punjabi in the Indian State of Punjab.

Gurus considered divine worship through shabad kirtan as the best means of attaining that state of bliss – vismad – which resulted in communion with God. The Guru Granth Sahib is divided by musical settings or rāgas into 1430 pages known as angs "limbs" in Sikh tradition. It can be categorized into three sections:

1. Introductory section consisting of the Mul Mantar, Japji Sahib, So Dhar (Rehras) and Sohila, composed by Guru Nanak;
2. Compositions of Sikh gurus, followed by those of the bhagats who know only God, collected according to the chronology of ragas or musical settings. (see below).
3. The post raga section containing Sanskrit Shaloka, the Gatha, Phunhe, and Chaubole compositions, Shaloka of Kabir, Shaloka of Farid, Savaiye by Guru and 11 Bhatts, Saloka of Guru Nanak, Guru Amar Das, Guru Ramdas, Guru Arjan, and Guru Tegh Bhaduar, Mundawani (closing), and Ragmala (the list of ragas).

The word raga refers to "color" here according to raga grammar the Gurus divided different scenarios one devotee is spiritually associated with the divine, for example the soul, referred to as female, may be separated, awaiting union, or united with the beloved. The emotion or mood produced by a combination or sequence of pitches. A rāga is composed of a series of melodic motifs, based upon a definite scale or mode of the seven svara psalmizations, that provide a basic structure around which the musician performs. Gurbani raags are not time dependent. The Ragmala (the final composition of the Granth) delineates how different ragas are related to each other.

Following is the list of all sixty rāgas under which Gurbani is written, in order of appearance with page numbers:

1. Asa (8)
2. Gujari (10)
3. Gauri Deepaki (12)
4. Dhanasri (13)
5. Gauri Poorabi (13)
6. Sri (14)
7. Majh (94)
8. Gauri Guarairee (151)
9. Gauri (151)
10. Gauri Dakhani (152)
11. Gauri Chaitee (154)
12. Gauri Bairagan (155)
13. Gauri Poorabi Deepaki (157)
14. Gauri Majh (172)
15. Gauri Malva (214)
16. Gauri Mala (214)
17. Gauri Sorath (330)
18. Asa Kafi (365)
19. Asavari (369)
20. Asa Asavari (409)
21. Devgandhari (527)
22. Bihagra (537)
23. Vadhans (557)
24. Vadhans Dakhani (580)
25. Sorath (595)
26. Jaitsri (696)
27. Todi (711)
28. Bairarri (719)
29. Tilang (721)
30. Tilang Kafi (726)
31. Suhee (728)
32. Suhee Kafi (751)
33. Suhee Lalit (793)
34. Bilaval (795)
35. Bilaval Dakhani (843)
36. Gound (859)
37. Bilaval Gound (874)
38. Ramkali (876)
39. Ramkali Dakhani (907)
40. Nut Narayan (975)
41. Nut (975)
42. Mali Gaura (984)
43. Maru (989)
44. Maru Kafi (1014)
45. Maru Dakhani (1033)
46. Tukhari (1107)
47. Kedara (1118)
48. Bhairo (1125)
49. Basant (1168)
50. Basant Hindol (1170)
51. Sarang (1197)
52. Malar (1254)
53. Kanra (1294)
54. Kaliyan (1319)
55. Kaliyan Bhopali (1321)
56. Parbhati Bibhas (1327)
57. Parbhati (1327)
58. Parbhati Dakhani (1344)
59. Bibhas Parbhati (1347)
60. Jaijavanti (1352)

=== Other recurring composition styles ===
Each raga section contains the typical compositions of the Gurus in chronological order by Guru (who wrote in that raga) followed by the typical compositions of the bhagats at the end however some form of certain types of special compositions such as the common recurring Vaars (longer ballad type poems), Chhands (poems based on an annunciation metre), Ashtapadiyan (contemplative measure), Pehre (poems on the four parts of the day), Haftawaar or Var Sat (poems about the seven days of the week), Bara Maha (poems based on the twelve months of the year), Thhithi (astrological poems based on the fifteen lunar dates) themes are found near the end of the most raga sections.

== Meaning and role in Sikhism ==
In 1708, Guru Gobind Singh conferred the title of "Guru of the Sikhs" upon the Adi Granth. The event was recorded in a Bhatt Vahi (a bard's scroll) by an eyewitness, Narbud Singh, who was a bard at the Rajput rulers' court associated with gurus. Sikhs since then have accepted the Guru Granth Sahib, the sacred scripture, as their eternal-living guru, as the embodiment of the ten Sikh Gurus, the highest religious and spiritual guide for Sikhs. It plays a central role in guiding the Sikh's way of life. As per Nikky-Guninder Singh Kaur, the Granth is revered by Sikhs both for being the actual physical body of the guru and also in an abstract sense as a metaphysical body of the collective works of the gurus.

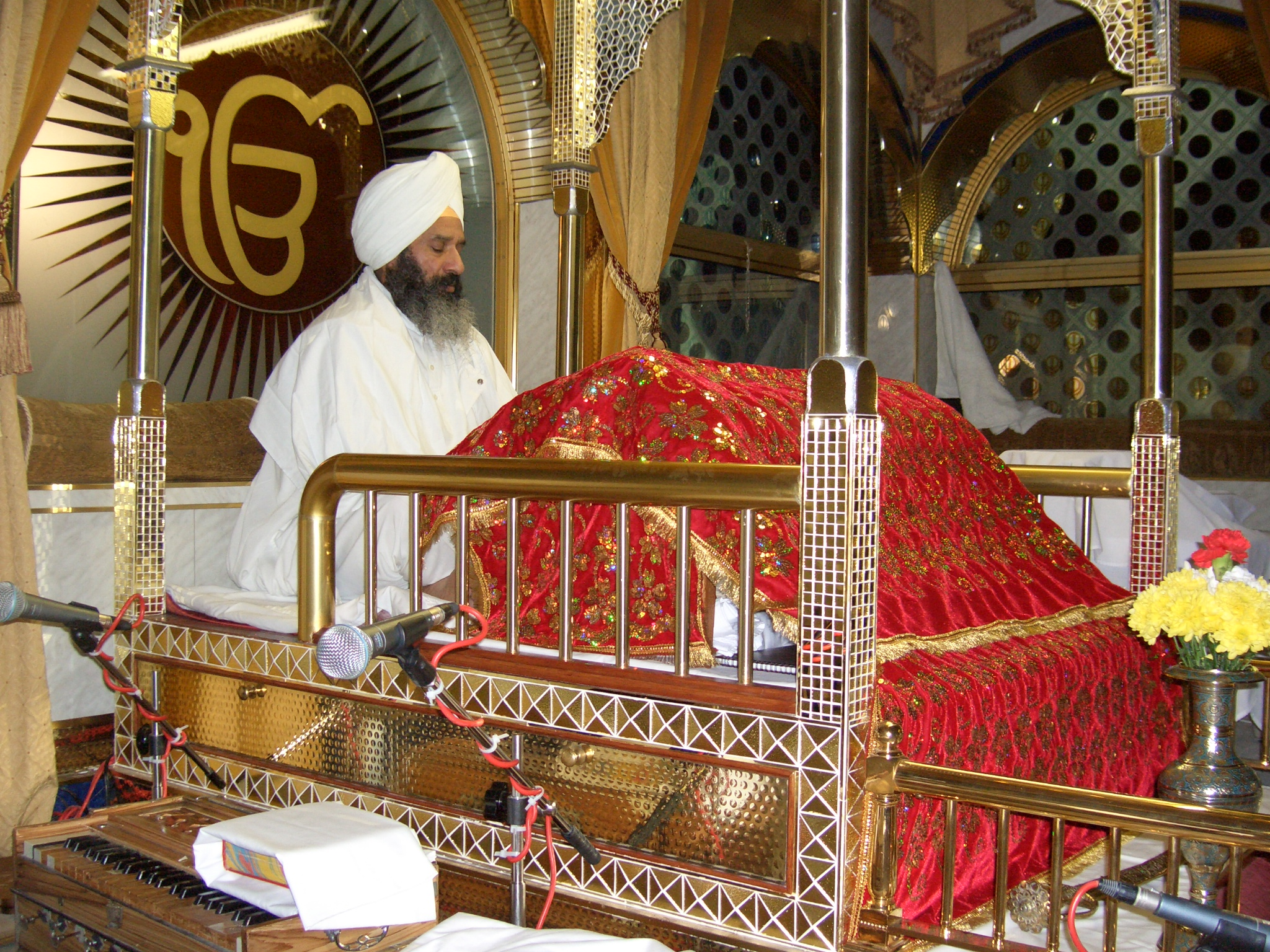
A Granthi reciting from the Guru Granth Sahib

No one can change or alter any of the writings of the Sikh gurus written in the Guru Granth Sahib. This includes sentences, words, structure, grammar, and meanings. This tradition was set by Guru Har Rai. He sent his eldest son Ram Rai as an emissary to the Mughal emperor Aurangzeb in Delhi. Aurangzeb, a devout Muslim ruler, objected to a verse in the Sikh scripture (Asa ki Var) that stated, "the clay from a Musalman's grave is kneaded into potter's lump", considering it an insult to Islam. Ram Rai tried to please the emperor by explaining that the text was miscopied and modified it, substituting "Musalman" with "Beiman" (faithless, evil) which Aurangzeb approved. The willingness to change a word led Guru Har Rai to bar his son from his presence, and name his younger son as his successor.

=== Recitation ===
The Guru Granth Sahib is always the focal point in any gurdwara, seated on a raised platform known as a Takht (throne), while the congregation of devotees sits on the floor and prostrate before the guru as a sign of respect. The Guru Granth Sahib is given the greatest respect and honour. Sikhs cover their heads and remove their shoes while in the presence of this sacred scripture, their eternal living guru. The Guru Granth Sahib is normally carried on the head and as a sign of respect, never touched with unwashed hands or put on the floor. It is attended with all signs of royalty, with a canopy placed over it. A Chaur Sahib (fan whisk) is waved above the Guru Granth Sahib.

The Guru Granth Sahib is taken care of by a Granthi, who is responsible for reciting from the sacred hymns and leading Sikh prayers. The Granthi also acts as caretaker for the Guru Granth Sahib, keeping the scripture covered in clean cloths, known as rumala, to protect from heat and dust. The Guru Granth Sahib rests on a manji sahib under a rumala until brought out again.

=== Rituals ===
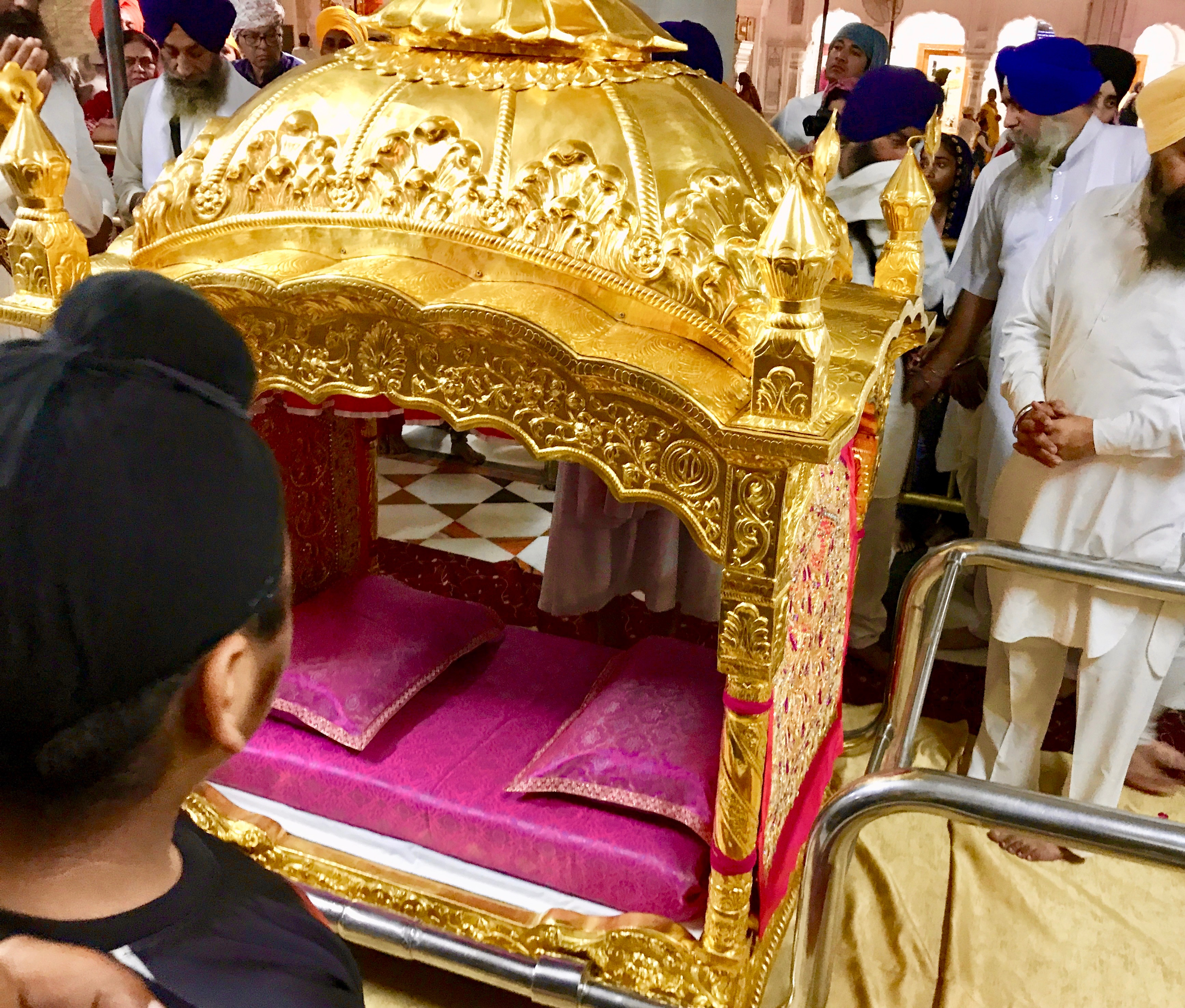
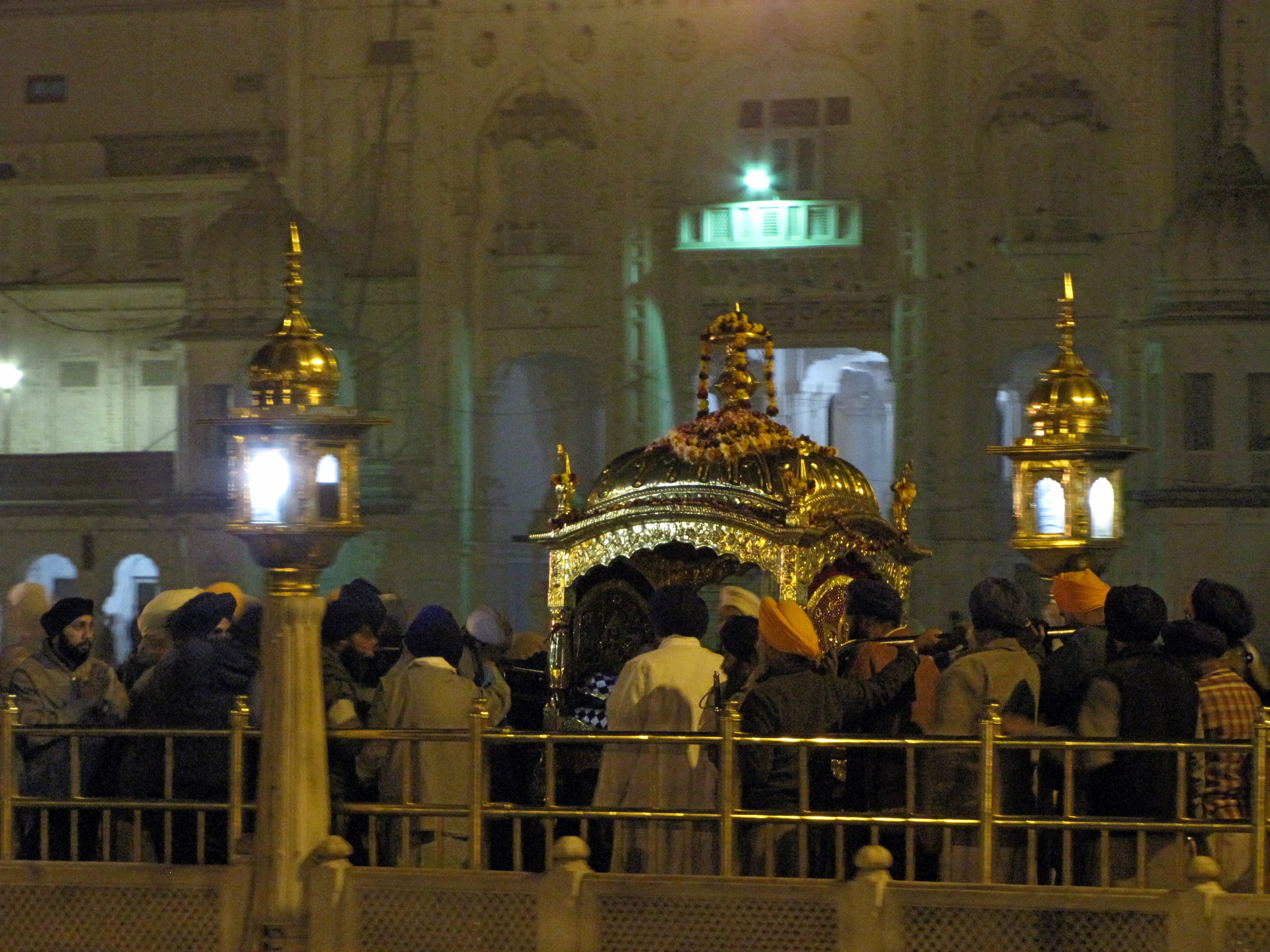
Left: A palanquin being prepared for the daily sukhasan ritual to carry the scripture to a bedroom; Right: The palanquin carrying the Guru Granth Sahib to the sanctum at dawn (prakash).

Several rituals are performed every day in major Sikh gurdwaras (temples) such as the Golden Temple. These rituals treat the scripture as a living person, a guru, out of respect. The rituals include:

- Closing ritual called sukhasan (sukh means "comfort or rest", asan means "position"). At night, after a series of devotional kirtans and three part ardās, the Guru Granth Sahib is closed, carried on the head, placed into and then carried in a flower decorated, pillow-bed palki (palanquin), with chanting to its bedroom. Once it arrives there, the scripture is tucked into a bed. (Note: In moderate-size gurdwaras, the palanquin step may be skipped and the scripture is simply carried on the head to its bedroom.)
- Opening ritual called prakash which means "light". About dawn every day, the Guru Granth Sahib is taken out its bedroom, carried on the head, placed and carried in a flower-decorated palki with chanting, sometimes with bugles sounding its passage. It is brought to the sanctum. Then after ritual singing of a series of Var Asa kirtans and ardas, a random page is opened. The first complete verse on the left page is the mukhwak (or vak) of the day. It is read out loud, and then written out for the pilgrims to read over that day.

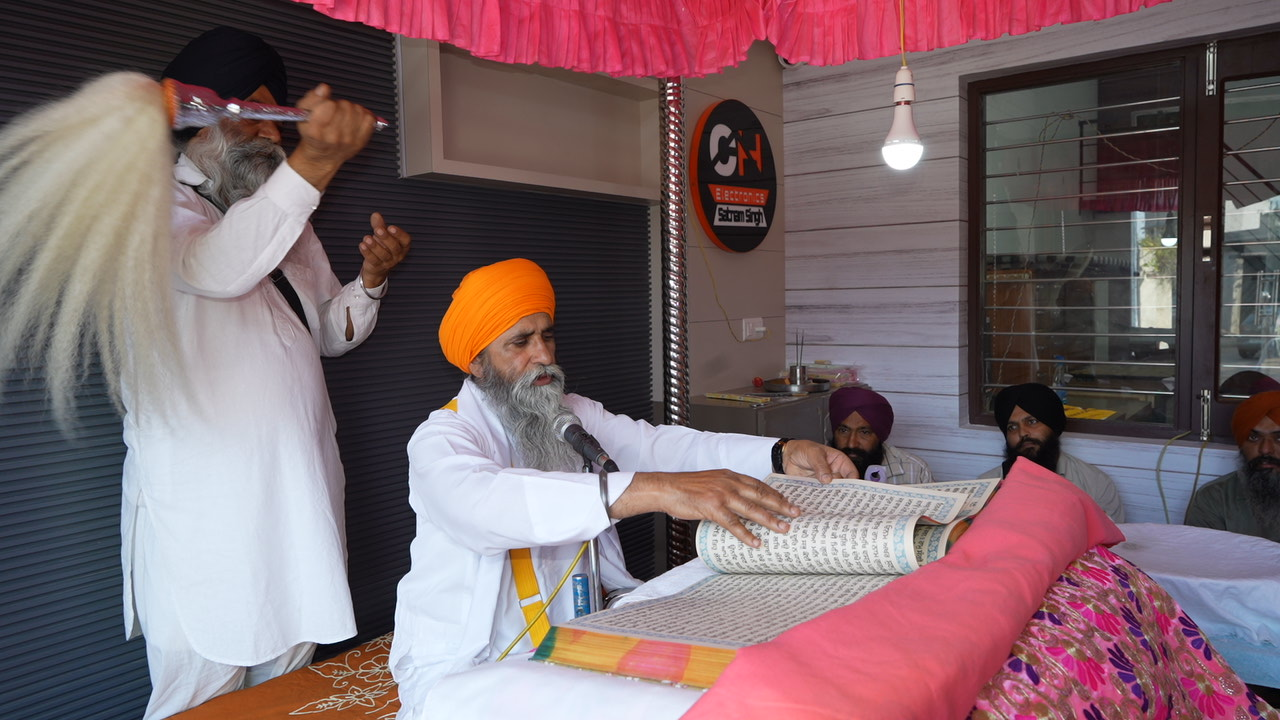
Prakash of Guru Granth Sahib at a workshop's opening in Chahal Hollanwali

According to Kristina Myrvold, every Sikh scripture copy is treated like a person and venerated with elaborate ceremonies which are a daily means of "merit bestowing ministrations". These daily ritual ministrations and paying of homage for the scripture by Sikhs, states Myrvold, is not unique to Sikhism. It moulds "meanings, values and ideologies" and creates a framework for congregational worship, states Myrvold, that is found in all major faiths.

==== Cremation ====
Any copies of the Guru Granth Sahib deemed unfit to be read from are cremated, with a ceremony similar to that for cremating a deceased person. Such a cremation is called Agan Bheta.

=== Extensions of the Guru Granth Sahib ===
The Akali Nihang sect of Sikhs consider the Dasam Granth and the Sarbloh Granth as extensions of the Guru Granth Sahib. As such, they refer to these scriptures as Sri Dasam Guru Granth Sahib, and Sri Sarbloh Guru Granth Sahib. They call the Guru Granth Sahib, Aad Guru Granth Sahib. They also sometimes refer to the granths as "Durbar", such as Aad Guru Durbar. The Sarbloh Granth has another name, as Sri Manglacharan Purana. They believe that all three of these scriptures are authentic, written by the Gurus and are one of the same. For this reason, they will often place the Dasam and Aad Granths on the same level and on the same throne (also known as the palki). They also sometimes do this for the Sarbloh Granth as well.

=== Weapons in front of the Guru Granth Sahib ===
In virtually all Sikh Gurdwaras, one will find an assortment of weapons such as swords, daggers, war quoits, etc. in front of the Guru Granth Sahib. This was brought about due to the emphasis of a martial spirit within the Sikh religion, as well as an influential composition from the Dasam Granth known as the Shastar Naam Mala, written by Guru Gobind Singh. Within this composition, it praises various types of weapons from all over the world, including swords, saifs, curved swords (tulwars), arrows, guns, etc. There is a famous line within the composition which states,

ਅਸ ਕ੍ਰਿਪਾਨ ਖੰਡੋ ਖੜਗ ਤੁਪਕ ਤਬਰ ਅਰੁ ਤੀਰ॥ ਸੈਫ ਸਰੋਹੀ ਸੈਹਥੀ ਯਹੈ ਹਮਾਰੈ ਪੀਰ॥੩॥

"As Kripan Khando Kharag, Tupak Tabar Ar Teer || Saif Sarohee Saithhee, Yehai Hamare Peer||3||"

The kirpan, the khanda, the scimitar, the axe, the rifle, and the arrow. The saif, the dagger, the spear: these indeed are our pirs (saints)!

(Shastar Naam Mala, Dasam Guru Granth Sahib)

For this reason, weapons are meant to be kept in front of the Guru Granth Sahib.

== Translations and research ==
Ernest Trumpp, a German philologist, published the first philological study and a major but incomplete English translation of the Guru Granth Sahib in 1877, after an eight-year study of the text and field interviews with Sikh intelligentsia of his time. As per Frederic Pincott, Trumpp only translated 5,719 stanzas out of a total of 15,575 stanzas found in the scripture in his translation. Trumpp included his criticism of the Sikh scripture in the preface and introductory sections, and stated "Sikhism is a waning religion, that will soon belong to history". Many in the Sikh community regarded these introductory remarks to his translation as extremely offensive. Nonetheless, according to Indologist Mark Juergensmeyer, Ernest Trumpp's years of scholarship, translations, and field notes and discussions with Sikhs at the Golden Temple remain valuable reference works for contemporary scholars. Akshaya Kumar holds Trumpp's translation to be "literal and mechanical" emphasizing preciseness and fastidiously retaining the words as well as the syntax of the original verses, avoiding any creative and inventive restatement to empathize with a believer. On the other hand, Arvind-Pal Singh Mandair noted the clear influence from the Brahmanical leanings of his Nirmala collaborators, among the British-supported Sikh class which had been long enjoying British patronage as they helped to keep "hostile" elements under control. For example, they induced Trumpp to omit the numeral "one" in the phrase Ik Oankar in his translation, in an attempt to bring the scripture closer to the Brahmanical-influenced interpretation of the sects that differed with the interpretation of the orthodox Khalsa. Trumpp's translation was seen to be a challenge to the administration's already-established view that the Sikhs were a distinct community, prompting the Khalsa to commission its own translation. Trumpp, as well as other translators, were commissioned by colonial administrators. Frederic Pincott published a work analyzing the hymns of the scripture in 1886. In 1892, Visnu Das Udasi published the Ādi Granthdā Kōsha, a glossary of the scripture. In 1893–94, Bawa Bishan Das published Ād Śrī Gurú Granth Sāhib Jí dá Kosh, covering the meanings of words occurring in the scripture.

Max Arthur Macauliffe, a British civil servant, was next to publish a major but incomplete translation of the Guru Granth Sahib (in six volumes published by Oxford University in 1909), covering the same ground as Trumpp. However, he interspersed his translation between Janamsakhis-based mythical history of the Sikh Gurus. A major source of his historical information was Suraj Prakash of Santokh Singh, and his primary translation advisor was the prominent Khalsa Sikh scholar Kahn Singh Nabha, the author of Gurmat Prabhakar and Hum Hindu Nahin. Macauliffe's translation appeared embedded in the six-volume The Sikh Religion and was published by Oxford University Press in 1909. Unlike Trumpp, who was unconcerned with the sensibilities of the Sikhs, Macauliffe used his editorial abilities to incorporate such considerations. According to Indologist Giorgio Shan, while Trumpp criticized Sikhism and the Guru Granth Sahib, Macauliffe criticized Hinduism and wrote an introduction that presented the hymns of Sikh Gurus as Christian-like with affinities to "Protestant virtues and ethics", presumably for a British audience. Macauliffe's translation was well received by the Sikh community, and they considered it closer to how they interpret their scripture. Post-colonial scholarship has questioned Macauliffe's accounting for and incorporation of Sikh traditions as "uncritical" and "dubious", though one that pleased the Sikh community. Macauliffe's version has been widely followed by later scholars and translators. According to Christopher Shackle, a scholar of Languages and Religion, Macauliffe's approach to translation was to work with Khalsa Sikh reformists of the 1890s (Singh Sabha) and exegetically present the scripture in a "progressive monotheism" fold that deserved the support of the British administration as a distinct tradition, and of the native Sikh clergy. He used considerable freedom in restating the archaic poetry into a "vaguely psalm-like translation".

ਹੁਕਮੀ ਹੋਵਨਿ ਆਕਾਰ ਹੁਕਮੁ ਨ ਕਹਿਆ ਜਾਈ ॥ ਹੁਕਮੀ ਹੋਵਨਿ ਜੀਅ ਹੁਕਮਿ ਮਿਲੈ ਵਡਿਆਈ ॥ ਹੁਕਮੀ ਉਤਮੁ ਨੀਚੁ ਹੁਕਮਿ ਲਿਖਿ ਦੁਖ ਸੁਖ ਪਾਈਅਹਿ ॥ ਇਕਨਾ ਹੁਕਮੀ ਬਖਸੀਸ ਇਕਿ ਹੁਕਮੀ ਸਦਾ ਭਵਾਈਅਹਿ ॥ ਹੁਕਮੈ ਅੰਦਰਿ ਸਭੁ ਕੋ ਬਾਹਰਿ ਹੁਕਮ ਨ ਕੋਇ ॥ ਨਾਨਕ ਹੁਕਮੈ ਜੇ ਬੁਝੈ ਤ ਹਉਮੈ ਕਹੈ ਨ ਕੋਇ ॥੨॥

ਗਾਵੈ ਕੋ ਤਾਣੁ ਹੋਵੈ ਕਿਸੈ ਤਾਣੁ ॥ ਗਾਵੈ ਕੋ ਦਾਤਿ ਜਾਣੈ ਨੀਸਾਣੁ ॥ ਗਾਵੈ ਕੋ ਗੁਣ ਵਡਿਆਈਆ ਚਾਰ ॥ ਗਾਵੈ ਕੋ ਵਿਦਿਆ ਵਿਖਮੁ ਵੀਚਾਰੁ ॥ਗਾਵੈ ਕੋ ਸਾਜਿ ਕਰੇ ਤਨੁ ਖੇਹ ॥ ਗਾਵੈ ਕੋ ਜੀਅ ਲੈ ਫਿਰਿ ਦੇਹ ॥ ਗਾਵੈ ਕੋ ਜਾਪੈ ਦਿਸੈ ਦੂਰਿ ॥ ਗਾਵੈ ਕੋ ਵੇਖੈ ਹਾਦਰਾ ਹਦੂਰਿ ॥ ਕਥਨਾ ਕਥੀ ਨ ਆਵੈ ਤੋਟਿ ॥ ਕਥਿ ਕਥਿ ਕਥੀ ਕੋਟੀ ਕੋਟਿ ਕੋਟਿ ॥ ਦੇਦਾ ਦੇ ਲੈਦੇ ਥਕਿ ਪਾਹਿ ॥ ਜੁਗਾ ਜੁਗੰਤਰਿ ਖਾਹੀ ਖਾਹਿ ॥ ਹੁਕਮੀ ਹੁਕਮੁ ਚਲਾਏ ਰਾਹੁ ॥ ਨਾਨਕ ਵਿਗਸੈ ਵੇਪਰਵਾਹੁ ॥੩॥

— Guru Granth Sahib Japji Sahib 2–3
Translation:

Hukmī hovan ākār hukam na kahiā jāī. Hukmī hovan jīa hukam milai vadiāī. Hukmī utam nīch hukam likh dukh sukh pāīah. Iknā hukmī bakhsīs ik hukmī sadā bhavāīah. Hukmai andar sabh ko bāhar hukam na koe. Nānak hukmai je bujhai ta haumai kahai na koe. ॥2॥

Gāvai ko tāṇ hovai kisai tāṇ. Gāvai ko dāt jāṇai nīsāṇ. Gāvai ko guṇ vadiāīā chār. Gāvai ko vidiā vikham vīchār. Gāvai ko sāj kare tan kheh. Gāvai ko jīa lai fir deh. Gāvai ko jāpai disai dūr. Gāvai ko vekhai hādrā hadūr. Kathnā kathī na āvai tot. Kath kath kathī kotī kot kot. Dedā de laide thak pāhi. Jugā jugantar khāhī khāhi. Hukmī hukam chalāe rāhu. Nānak vigsai veparvāhu.

— Transliteration

Translation by Ernest Trumpp (1877)
By (his) order are made the forms (of all things), his order (however) cannot be told. By his order are made the living beings, by his order greatness is obtained. By his order are the high and the low, by his order pain and pleasure are set down. By his order some are pardoned, some are by his order always caused to wander about (in transmigration). Every one is under (within) his order, exempt from his order is no one. Nanak! if one understand his order, he will not speak in self-conceit. [2]

One sings his (i.e. God's) power, if one has power (so to do). Another sings (his) liberality, if he knows (his) sign. One sings his beautiful qualities and greatnesses. — Another sings a difficult thought of science. One sings: having made the body he reduces it to ashes. Another sings: having taken life he gives it again. One sings: he is known (manifest), (but) seen afar off. Another sings: being present he sees in the presence. There is no end of sayings and tellings. The story, story is told by crores, crores, crores. He (i.e. God) goes on giving, they taking become tired. For ages and ages they go on eating. The Lord goes on executing his order. O Nanak! he expands unconcerned. [3]

— Guru Granth Sahib Japji Sahib 2–3
Translation:

Translation by Max Arthur Macauliffe (1909)
By His order bodies are produced; His order cannot be described. By His order souls are infused into them; by His order greatness is obtained. By His order men are high or low; by His order they obtain preordained pain or pleasure.
By His order some obtain their reward; by His order others must ever wander in transmigration. All are subject to His order; none is exempt from it. He who understandeth God's order, O Nanak, is never guilty of egoism. [2]

Some sing His power according to their abilities; Some sing His gifts according to their knowledge of His signs; Some sing His attributes, His greatness, and His deeds; Some sing His knowledge whose study is arduous; Some sing that He fashioneth the body and again destroyeth it; Some that He taketh away the soul and again restoreth it; Some that He appeareth far from mortal gaze; Some that He is all-seeing and omnipresent. Millions of men give millions upon millions of descriptions of Him, but they fail to describe Him. The Giver giveth; the receiver groweth weary of receiving. In every age man subsisteth by His bounty. The Commander by His order hath laid out the way of the world. Nanak, God the unconcerned is happy. [3]

— Guru Granth Sahib Japji Sahib 2–3

The first complete English translation of the Guru Granth Sahib, by Gopal Singh, was published in 1960. A revised version published in 1978 removed archaic English words such as "thee" and "thou". In 1962, an eight-volume translation into English and Punjabi by Manmohan Singh was published by the Shiromani Gurdwara Parbandhak Committee. In the 2000s, a translation by Sant Singh Khalsa appeared on major Sikhism-related websites such as 3HO/Sikh Dharma Brotherhood's Sikhnet.com.

A 26-volume Sindhi translation of the scripture was produced by Dada Rewa Chand of Sindh.

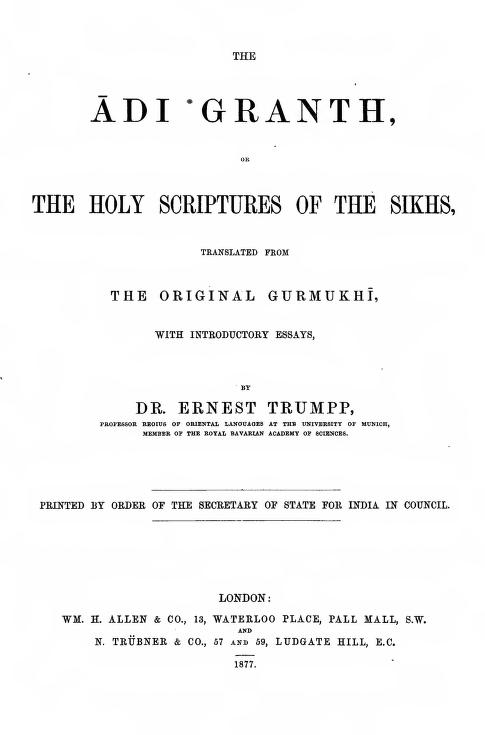
Title-page of The Ādi Granth: Or, the Holy Scriptures of the Sikhs by Ernest Trumpp, 1877

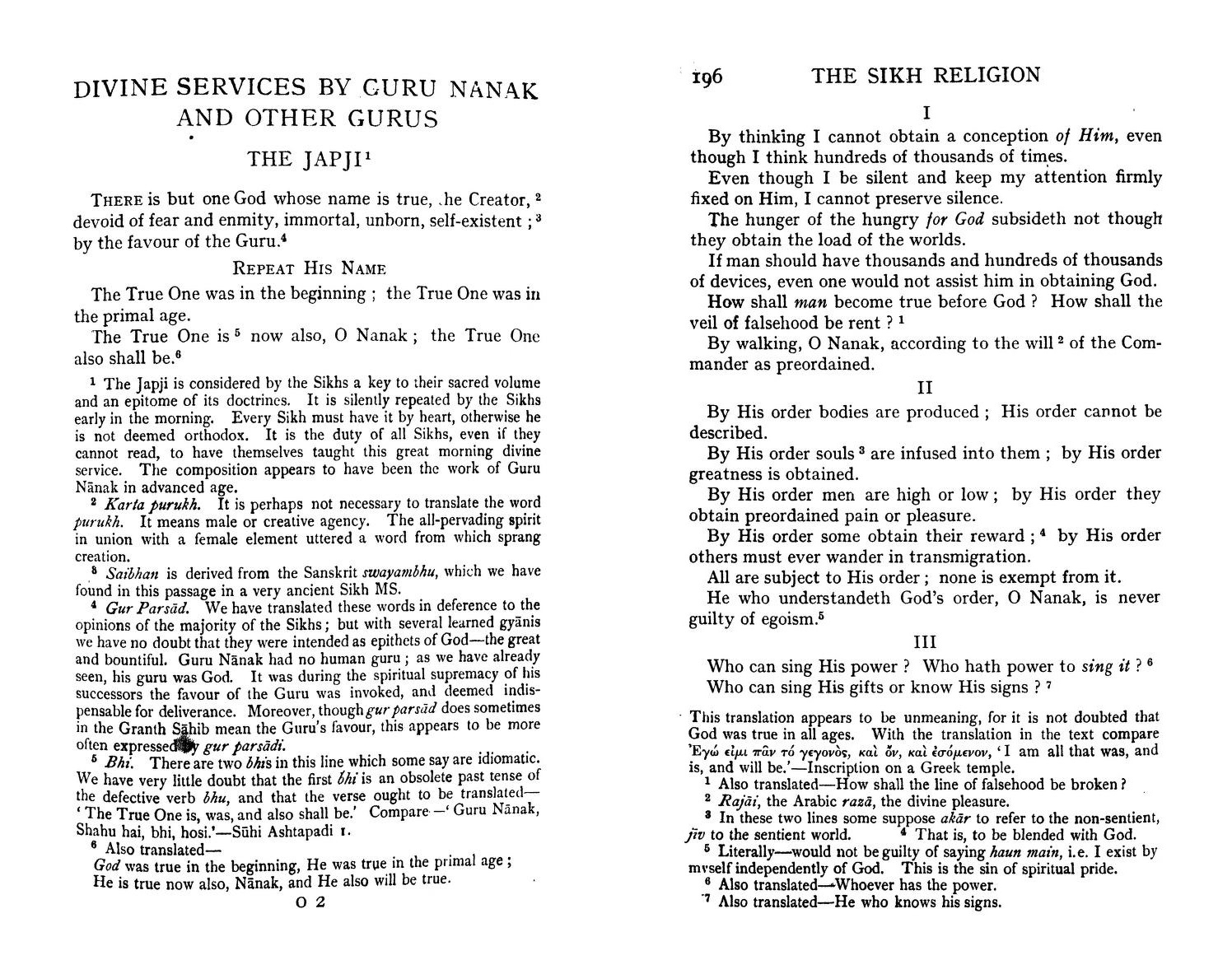
English translation of the opening lines of Guru Nanak's Japji Sahib composition by Max Arthur MacAuliffe, published in The Sikh Religion - Its Gurus, Sacred Writings and Authors (volume 1), 1909

== Printing ==
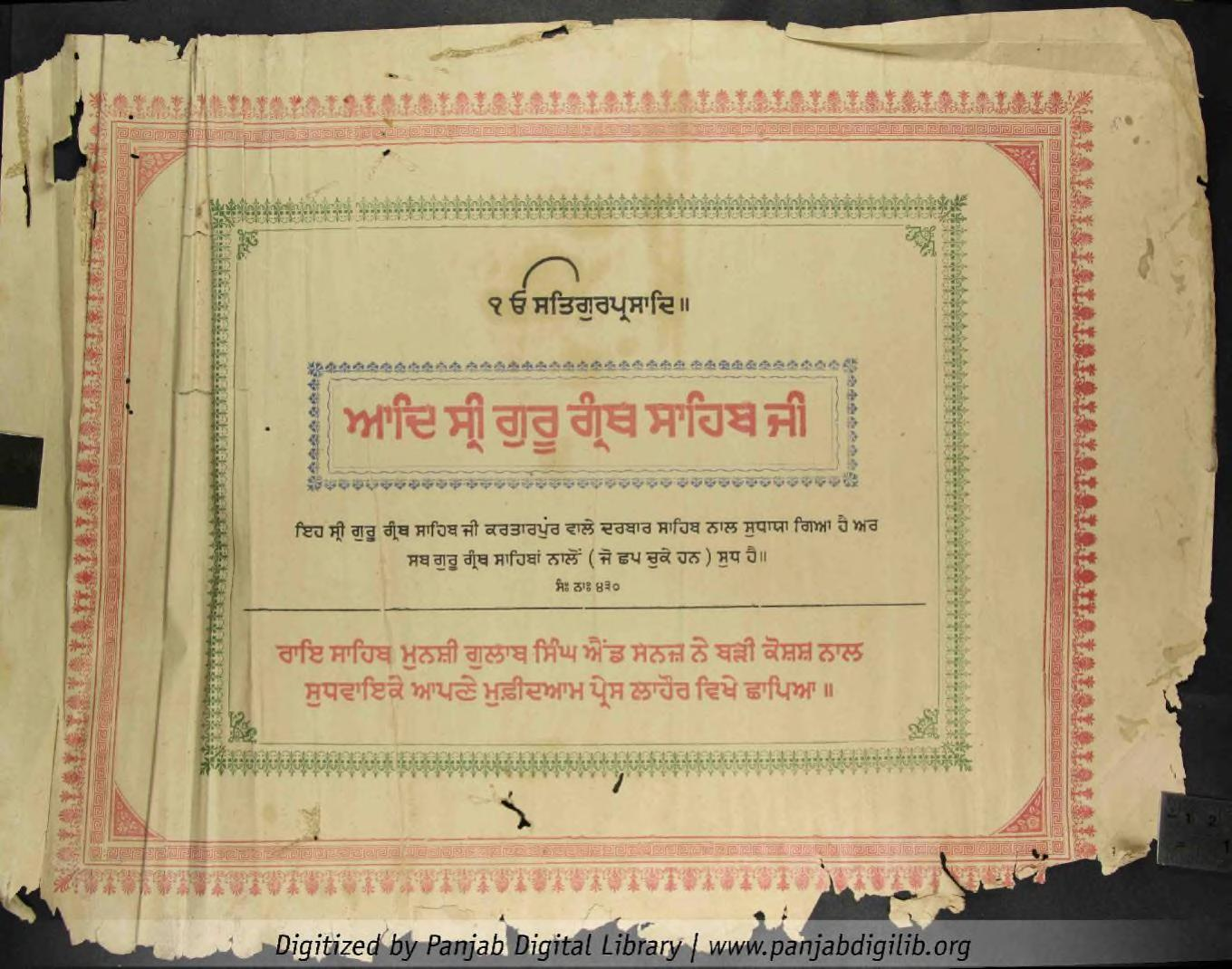
Title-page of a metal-type print of the Guru Granth Sahib based upon the Kartarpur Bir, by Rai Sahib Munshi Gulab Singh and Sons, published by the Mufidam Press, 1899

The original Guru Granth Sahib is in the possession of the Sodhi family of Kartarpur village, and is placed at Gurdwara Thum Sahib. The Sodhis are descendants of Guru Arjan Dev and Kartarpur was founded by him in 1598. Prior to the late nineteenth century, only handwritten copies were prepared. Numerous early printed editions of the Guru Granth Sahib were published in the colonial period during the second half of the 19th century, including in Lahore (1864, 1868, 1881, 1885, 1886, 1887, 1889, all in Gurmukhi), Gujranwala (1882, Gurmukhi), Amritsar (1892, Gurmukhi), and Lucknow (1893, in Devanagari). The first printed copy of the Guru Granth Sahib was made in 1864. According to Namdhari Sikh literature, Diwan Buta Singh was the first person to print an edition of the Guru Granth Sahib, which was likely printed in 1868 or even earlier, with Grierson noting a printed edition that had been published in 1864. Early printed editions of the Guru Granth Sahib from the late-19th century were not only printed in Gurmukhi script but also Perso-Arabic script, as evidenced by eighteen different editions of the scripture being printed in Perso-Arabic script at Lahore, Gujranwala, and Sialkot between the years 1871 and 1895. Since the early 20th century, it has been printed in a standard edition of 1430 Angs.

Official versions of the Guru Granth Sahib are produced in Amritsar by the Shiromani Gurdwara Parbandhak Committee (SGPC). The SGPC printers are the only authorized worldwide publisher of the scripture, states the Sikh religious body Akal Takht. On 9 May 1998, the Akal Takht jathedar Ranjit Singh issued a hukamnama injunction which banned private publishing of the Guru Granth Sahib and gave sole rights to printing the scripture to the SGPC. However, some private printing firms ignored this order and continued to privately publish copies of the scripture. Prior to 2006, Jeewan Singh Chattar Singh & Sons used to print the official versions and were the oldest publisher in Amritsar. However, in 2006, the Akal Takht banned them from printing the Sikh scripture after a sting operation showed that they were printing and mishandling the scripture as well as selling an illegal copy of the Sikh scripture to a Muslim seer. A subsidiary of the SGPC, the Delhi Sikh Gurudwara Management Committee, is the authorized printer and supplier of the Guru Granth Sahib to Sikhs outside of India. These facilities are a part of the Gurudwara Rakabganj in New Delhi. In 2007, the state of Punjab in India made it illegal for private firms to create copies of the scripture.

The Guru Granth Sahib is currently printed in an authorized printing press in the basement of the Gurudwara Ramsar in Amritsar; misprints and set-up sheets, and printer's waste with any of its sacred text on, are cremated at Goindval.

In September 2023, it was announced by the SGPC that a location in Tracy, California, USA under the purview of the Dharm Prachar Kendra of the Shiromani Committee will begin officially printing copies of the Guru Granth Sahib to cater to the demands of the Sikh diaspora living in North America.

== Legacy ==
Pearl S. Buck, winner of the Nobel Prize in Literature in 1938, stated the following about the scripture:

Shri Guru Granth Sahib is a source book, an expression of man's loneliness, his aspiration, his longings, his cry to God and his hunger for communication with that being. I have studied the scriptures of other great religions, but I do not find elsewhere the same power of appeal to the heart and mind as I feel here in these volumes. They are compact in spite of their length, and are a revelation of the vast reach of the human heart varying from the most noble concept of God to the recognition and indeed the insistence upon the practical needs of the human body. There is something strangely modern about these scriptures and this puzzled me until I learnt that they are in fact comparatively modern, compiled as late as the sixteenth century, when explorers were beginning to discover the globe upon which we all live as a single entity divided only by arbitrary lines of our own making.

Perhaps this sense of unity is a source of power I find in these volumes. They speak to persons of any religion or of none. They speak for the human heart and the searching mind...

— Pearl S. Buck, quoted in Dharma: The Hindu, Jain, Buddhist and Sikh Traditions of India by Veena R. Howard (2017), page 219

Three stanzas from the scripture read by Iqtidar Cheema were utilised in a video produced by the United Nations released on 30 March 2021 to commemorate the 4th anniversary of the United Nations Faith for Rights declaration.

== See also ==
- Glossary of Sikhism
- Sikh gurus
- Sikh scriptures
