= Jaitsri =

Hindustani raga

Jaitsri is an Indian classical raga that appears in the Sikh tradition from northern India and is part of the Guru Granth Sahib. It provided the setting for hymns by Guru Ram Das, Guru Arjan and Guru Tegh Bahadar for a total of 30 hymns.

It is the 26th raag, in order of appearance, in Guru Granth Sahib.

Jaitsiri conveys the heartfelt emotion of not being able to live without someone. Its mood is preoccupied with feelings of dependence and an overwhelming sense of desperately reaching out to be with that person.

The following represents the order of notes that can be used on the ascending and descending phase of the composition and the primary and secondary notes:

Jaitsri
Scale	Notes
Aroh	Sa Ga Ma Pa Ni Sa
Avroh	Sa Ni Dha Pa Ma Pa Ga Re Sa
Pakar	Sa, Ga Pa M'a Dha Pa M'a Ga, M'a Ga Re Sa Vadi : Ga
Vadi	Pa
Samvadi	Ni

Details of Guru's bani
Name	hymns
Guru Ram Das	11
Guru Arjan Dev	17
Guru Teg Bahadur	3
Bhagat Ravidas	3

== See also ==
- Kirtan
