= Suhi (raga) =

North Indian raga

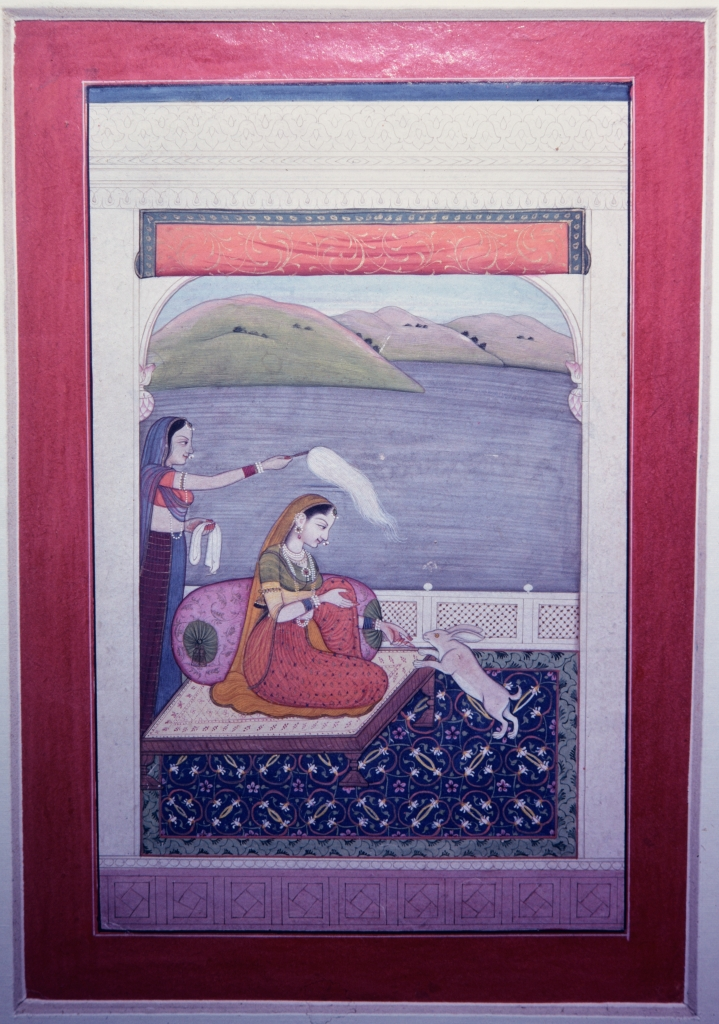
- Arohana: Sa Re Ga Ma Pa, Ni(k) Dha Ni Sa
- Avarohana: sa ni dha, pa ma- ga re- sa
- Vadi: sa
- Samavadi: pa

Suhi, a very old North Indian raga.: it also appears in the Sikh tradition from northern India and forms part of the Guru Granth Sahib. In the Guru Granth Sahib, the composition appear in 62 ragas and this is the thirty first raga to appear in the series. The composition in this raga first appear on Ang number 728.

Raag Suhi (ਸੂਹੀ) – Suhi is an expression of such devotion that the listener experiences feelings of extreme closeness and undying love. The listener is bathed in that love and genuinely learns what it means to adore.

Raga Suhi was favoured for religious events and is found in many ancient articles on music. Suhi is a rare but popular concert raga today and is considered one of the most famous from among the North Indian classical system. It is traditionally performed at sunraise. Guru Nanak, Guru Amar Das, Guru Ram Das, Guru Arjan and Bhagats have composed sacred hymns (Shabads) to be accompanied with this raga. It accompanies about 143 Shabads.

- Aroh: sa re ga, ma pa, ni dha ni, sa
- Avroh: sa ni dha, pa ma ga re sa
- Pakad: sa, re ga ma pa, pa ma ga, re ga, re, sa
- Vadi: pa
- Samvadi: sa

Suhi Raga
Name	In English
Aroh	Sa Re Ga Ma Pa, Ni(k) Dha Ni Sa
Avroh	Sa Ni(k) Dh Pa, Ma Ga Re Ga Re Sa
Vadi	Pa
Samvadi	Sa
Pakar	Sa Ni(k) Dh Pa, Ma Ga Re Ga Re Sa

Shabda in Raga in Gurbani
Name	Sabad
Guru Nanak Dev ji	22
Guru Amar Das ji	12
Guru Ram Das ji	23
Guru Arjan Dev ji	75
Bhagat Kabir	5
Bhagat Ravidas	3
Bhagat Farid	2
Varan	Mahila Third-1

== See also ==
- Kirtan
