= Diwan Buta Singh =

- Born: 1826; Lahore, Sikh Empire
- Known for: First person to print an edition of the Guru Granth Sahib
- Father: Gurdial Singh

Diwan Buta Singh (born 1826) was a Sikh official, journalist, writer, and printer. He served as Maharani Jind Kaur's household minister (diwan) and was the vice-president of the Lahore Singh Sabha. According to Kuka literature, he was the first man to print a copy of the Guru Granth Sahib, the primary Sikh scripture.

== Biography ==
=== Early years ===
He was born in Lahore in 1826 into a Kalal family to a father named Gurdial Singh. In his early vocation, he served as the household minister and retainer of Jind Kaur of the Sikh Empire. Just prior to the Second Anglo-Sikh War, he tried to provoke anti-British feelings amongst the local people in the name of Jind Kaur. He was one of the last employees of the ruling Sikh Empire. After the Multan Rebellion, he was imprisoned by the British, who had already suspecting him of anti-British proclivities, such as the Prema Plot. He was deported from Punjab and imprisoned in Allahabad prison for seven years. He was released from incarceration in the mid-1850s and returned to Lahore after his release, where he quickly regained his lost prestige.

=== Printing press and publishing ===
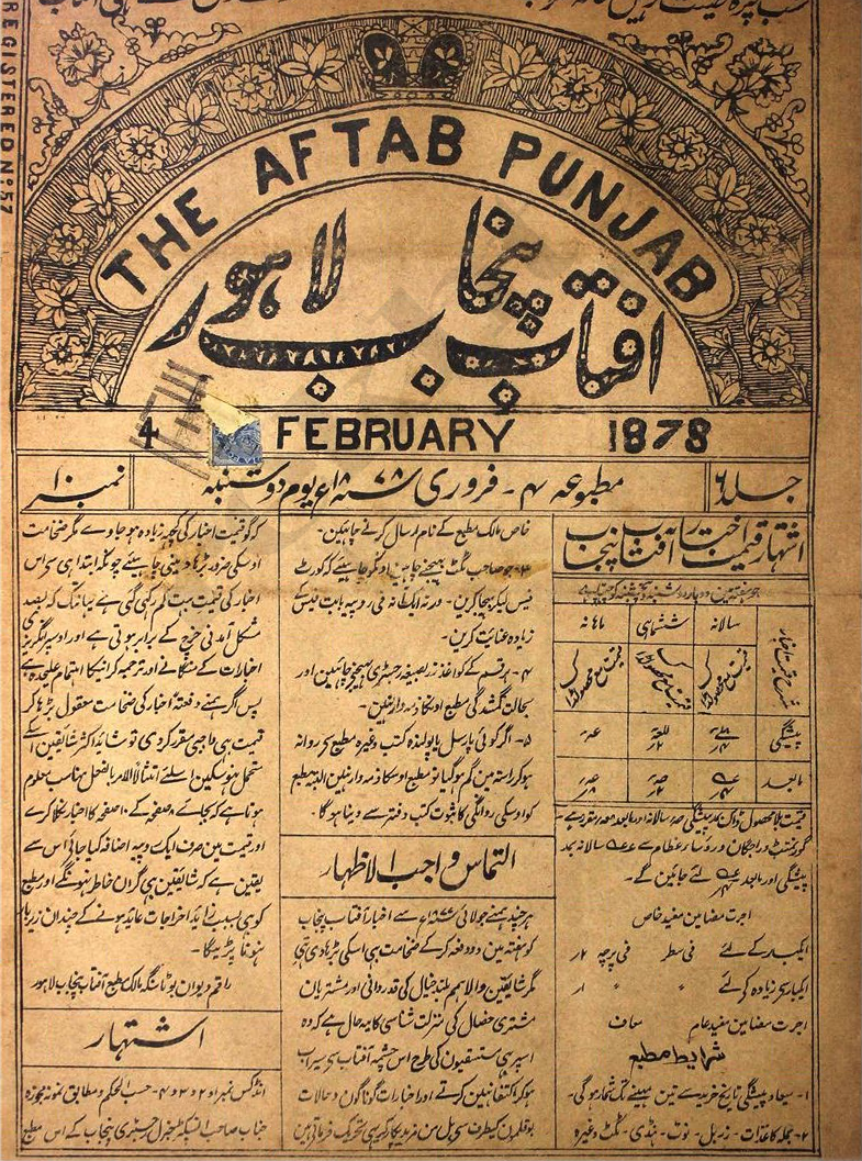
Front-page of an issue of Aftab-i-Punjab, a weekly Sikh newspaper founded by Diwan Buta Singh, 4 February 1878 issue

By the 1860s, journalism was a budding industry in Lahore, with the amount of local editors, journalists, calligraphists, printers, compositors, and binders increasing. In 1866, Buta established the Aftab-i-Punjab Press in Lahore. Buta was proficient in Persian, Urdu, and Punjabi (Gurmukhi), and he founded an Urdu law journal, the first one in the province, called the Anwar-ul-Shams, in 1866. Later in 1872, he founded an Urdu weekly newspaper titled Aftab-i-Punjab, which was the first major newspaper to be devoted to Sikh causes. (Note: Alternatively transliterated as 'Aftab-i-Panjab'.) The Aftab-i-Punjab newspaper's readership and publication intervals varied over time, but it generally reached an audience of around 500 (the number of literate Sikhs back then was small, limiting the circulation of newspapers to between 100-500 readers generally). Throughout its history, the Aftab-i-Punjab newspaper had employed editors (including staff leaders) of many religious backgrounds, from Sikhs, Hindus, and Muslims. One of the early editors who worked on the Aftab-i-Punjab newspaper, during the period of 1872–1880, was a Muslim man named Sheikh Fakir Muhammad, who had worked years earlier as an apprentice editor of the Kohi-i-Nur, which had been the first Urdu newspaper in Punjab. (Note: The Kohi-i-Nur was founded in the 1850s by Harsukh Rai, a Kayastha from the North-West Provinces.) The newspaper promoted cow protection, gently criticized British administration of the region, promoted Sikhs being loyal to the government, and believed that Sikhism was a separate religion from Hinduism (the newspaper advocated for the removal of Hindu beliefs and practices that they believed had crept into Sikhism). The Aftab-i-Punjab was overall critical of the British government's policies and actions against Duleep Singh, the deposed Sikh monarch. The Aftab-i-Punjab sourced its content from cuttings of English-language and local Indian languages' periodicals or through its correspondents stationed at various districts. Buta Singh, though not a Namdhari himself, had close ties with the Namdhari sect and praised them for their support of Duleep Singh. Buta Singh also founded a Punjabi weekly newspaper titled Khalsa Prakash in 1891, with it being published by the Aftab-i-Punjab Press. The Khalsa Prakash journal ran until 1899 and generally reached an audience of 250. The Aftab-i-Punjab Press also published many Gurmukhi books on Sikh topics.

As his publishing business grew, Buta established local branches in the cities of Peshawar and Ajmer. The local Ajmer branch was responsible for publishing the Rajputana Government Gazette issues. Eventually the Ajmer branch shut its operations yet the Peshawar branch continued.

According to Namdhari Sikh literature, Buta Singh was the first person to print an edition of the Guru Granth Sahib, which was likely printed in 1868 or even earlier. After Ram Singh, guru of the Namdharis, was exiled to Burma, Buta Singh kept in communication with his successor, Hari Singh, who was headquartered at Bhaini Sahib. He exchanged secret information to the Namdharis and reported about their anti-British rebellious activities in his newspapers.

On 27 August 1883, the Aftab-i-Punjab newspaper of Diwan Buta Singh blamed European traders for the increase in grain prices, such as wheat, due to the traders exporting it.

In a confidential letter by C. L. Tupper to H. M. Durrand dated to 28 December 1885, Tupper claims that prior to the exiling of Ram Singh to Burma, Buta Singh was a Namdhari but he no longer followed the Namdhari faith afterwards. Tupper alleges that 300 translated copies of Evan Bell's book titled The Annexation of the Punjaub, and the Maharajah Duleep Singh into Punjabi (translated by Partap Singh of Amritsar) were planned to be printed by Thakur Singh Sandhanwalia at the Aftab-i-Punjab Press of Diwan Buta Singh for the purpose of distributing the literature to certain figures of the Punjab province. Tupper reports that Buta Singh had eight established printing machines near the Kotwali in the city of Lahore. Tupper describes the Aftab-i-Punjab newspaper as being "moderate in tone" as a rule, yet occasionally advocates against cow slaughter. Tupper references a January 1883 account published by the newspaper that "distorts" the killing of a police constable at Bhaini Sahib by a Namdhari fanatical named Arbangi Das, showing sympathies to the Namdhari cause in its published account of the murder. Tupper claims that Diwan Buta Singh keeps in-correspondence with Thakur Singh Sandhawalia.

=== Later life ===
He served as the vice-president for the then newly established Lahore Singh Sabha.
