= Rāgmala (Sikhism) =

Composition in Sri Guru Granth Sahib Ji

Ragamala
- Guru Granth Sahib
- ← Mundavani
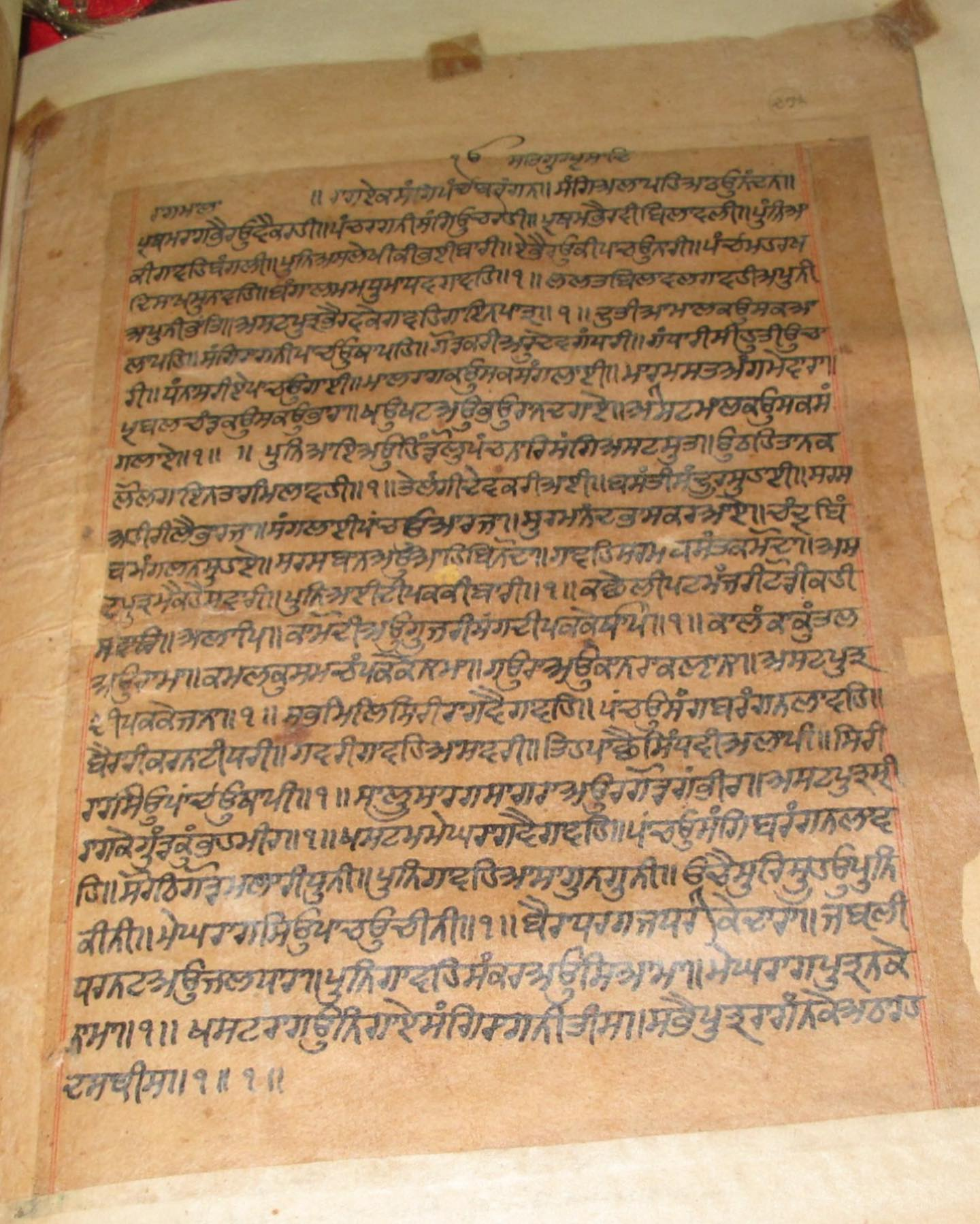
- Folio of the Ragamala composition of the Kartarpur Bir which was written by Bhai Gurdas under the supervision of Guru Arjan, ca.1604

Information
- Religion: Sikhism
- Author: Disputed
- Language: Sant Bhasha
- Verses: twelve verses running into sixty lines

Ragmala, alternatively spelt as Raagmala or Ragamala (Punjabi: ਰਾਗਮਾਲਾ (Gurmukhi); pronounced rāgmālā,) is a composition of twelve verses (sixty lines) that names various raga. These raga appear in the saroops of Guru Granth Sahib, after the compositions of Guru Arjan entitled Mundavani (ਮੁੰਦਾਵਣੀ; meaning "The Royal Seal".)

The title literally means a 'Garland of Raga’, or a ‘Mode of Musical Melodies’ - "mala" means "garland", while "raga" means “musical composition or mode.” This work has inspired the series of Ragamala paintings. The list differs according to the author and the music school it is based upon. Variations on these lists can be found in the music text books of India.

== Controversy ==
There are eight raga used in Guru Granth Sahib that have not been mentioned in the Ragmala. These are: Bihagara, Wadahans, Manjh, Jaitsri, Ramkali, Tukhari, Prabhati and Jaijawanti. Mali-Gaura is not included in Raagmala but Gaura is.

“The last pages of the Kartarpur Beerh do not suggest, either because of the presence of blank spaces, or scoring out, or obliteration hortal, or otherwise, that there was or could have been the least intention to write these hymns in the Granth. The Mudaavni is on page 973/1. Pages 973/2 and 974/1 are blank, and on page 974/2 is Raagmala. As such, there could never have been the possibility, nor could it ever have been contemplated that these three writings requiring a space of over four pages could have been accommodated on the two blank pages 973/2 and 974/1.” - Professor Sahib Singh

According to Dr. S. S. Kapoor, the Sikh scholars differ in their opinion about its inclusion in the Granth. The traditional school thinks it to be a part of the Guru Granth Sahib and asserts that it is an index of raga used in the Guru Granth Sahib. This argument can be challenged on the grounds that the contents do not fully match. Another argument of the traditional schools (sampardai) that the Ragmala belongs to the original copy (written in the same ink and the same pen as the other parts) of the Granth.

Various Sikh Sampardas (traditional lineages of knowledge) allege that the Ragmala is not just a rosary of the Raags of the Guru Granth Sahib, but has a deeper spiritual meaning.

Bhai Randhir Singh, founder of the Akhand Kirtani Jatha, did not consider the Raagmala to be gurbani. The group as a whole rejects the composition's authenticity.

== Official SGPC standpoint on the Raagmala ==
Article XI (a) of the Sikh Rehat Maryada (SRM):

The reading of the whole Guru Granth Sahib (intermittent or non-stop) may be concluded with the reading of Mundawani or the Rag Mala according to the convention traditionally observed at the concerned place. (Since there is a difference of opinion within the Panth on this issue, nobody should dare to write or print a copy of the Guru Granth Sahib excluding the Rag Mala). Thereafter, after reciting the Anand Sahib, the Ardas of the conclusion of the reading should be offered and the sacred pudding (Karhah Prashad) distributed.

== Gallery ==
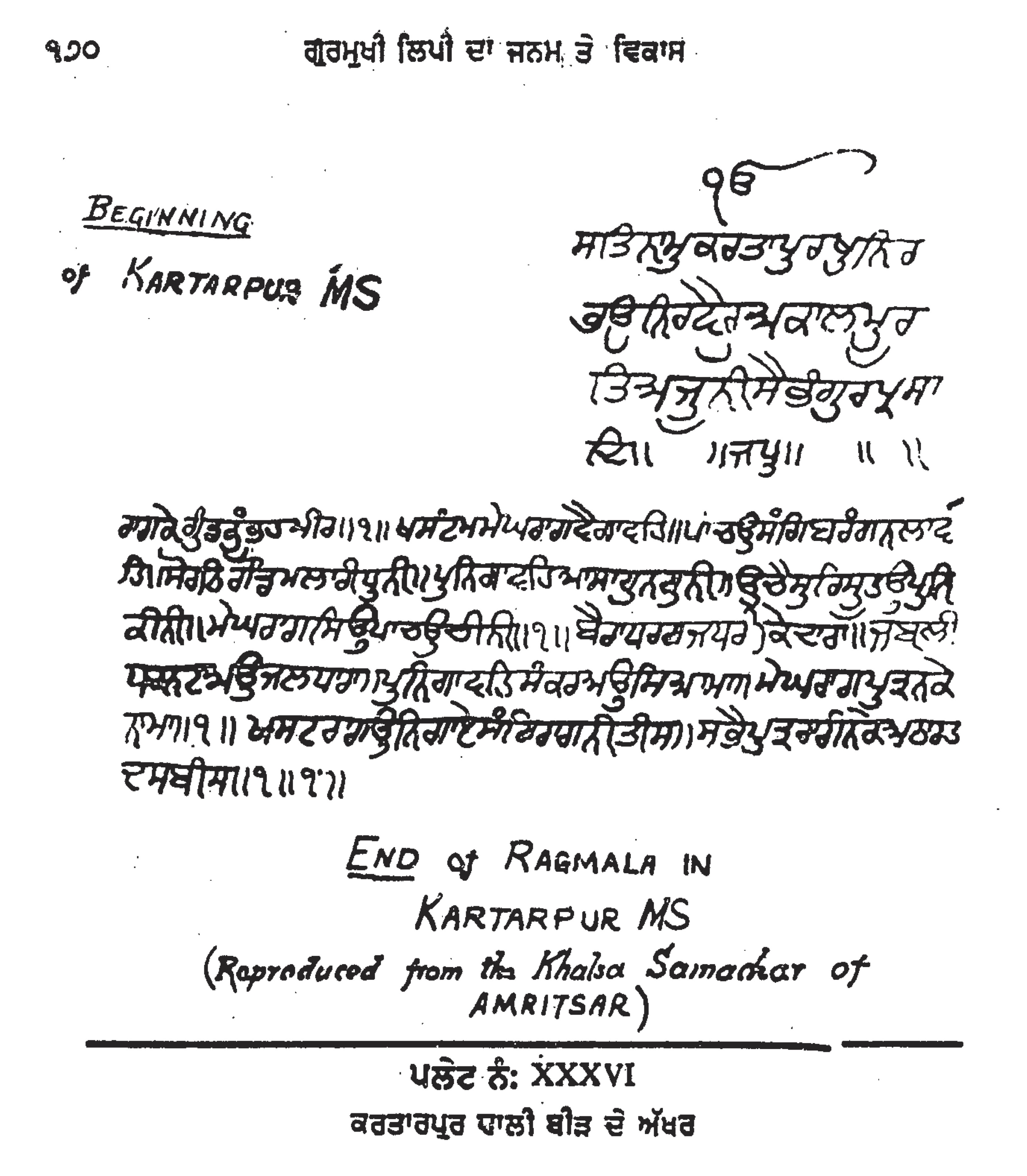
Mul Mantar and end of Ragamala from the Kartarpur Bir (circa 29 August 1604; the word "bir" means manuscript or codex) of the Guru Granth Sahib

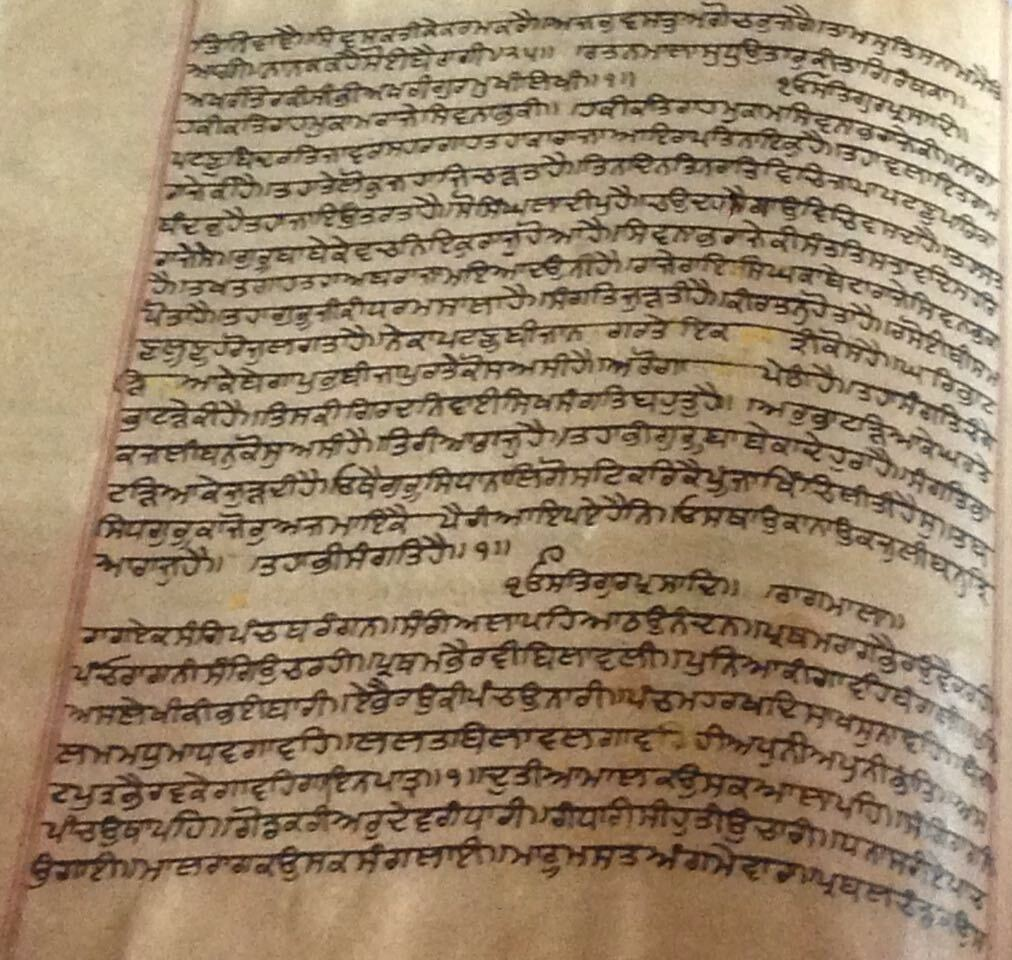
Page showing the Ratanmala, Hakikat Rah Mukam Raja Shiv Nabh Ki, and Ragamala (the first two being unauthenticated compositions, known as kachi bani) from a Guru Granth Sahib manuscript attributed to Baba Natha Singh, pre-1708

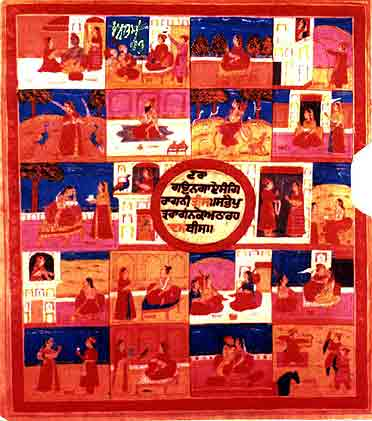
Sikh Ragamala paintings from the last page of an illustrated Guru Granth Sahib, which carries the last verse of the Ragmala in a tiny circle. The script is in the Paonta Sahib hand, circa 18th century

== See also ==
- Ragamala paintings
- Sikh Raags
