= Giani =

Honorific Sikh title and historical order

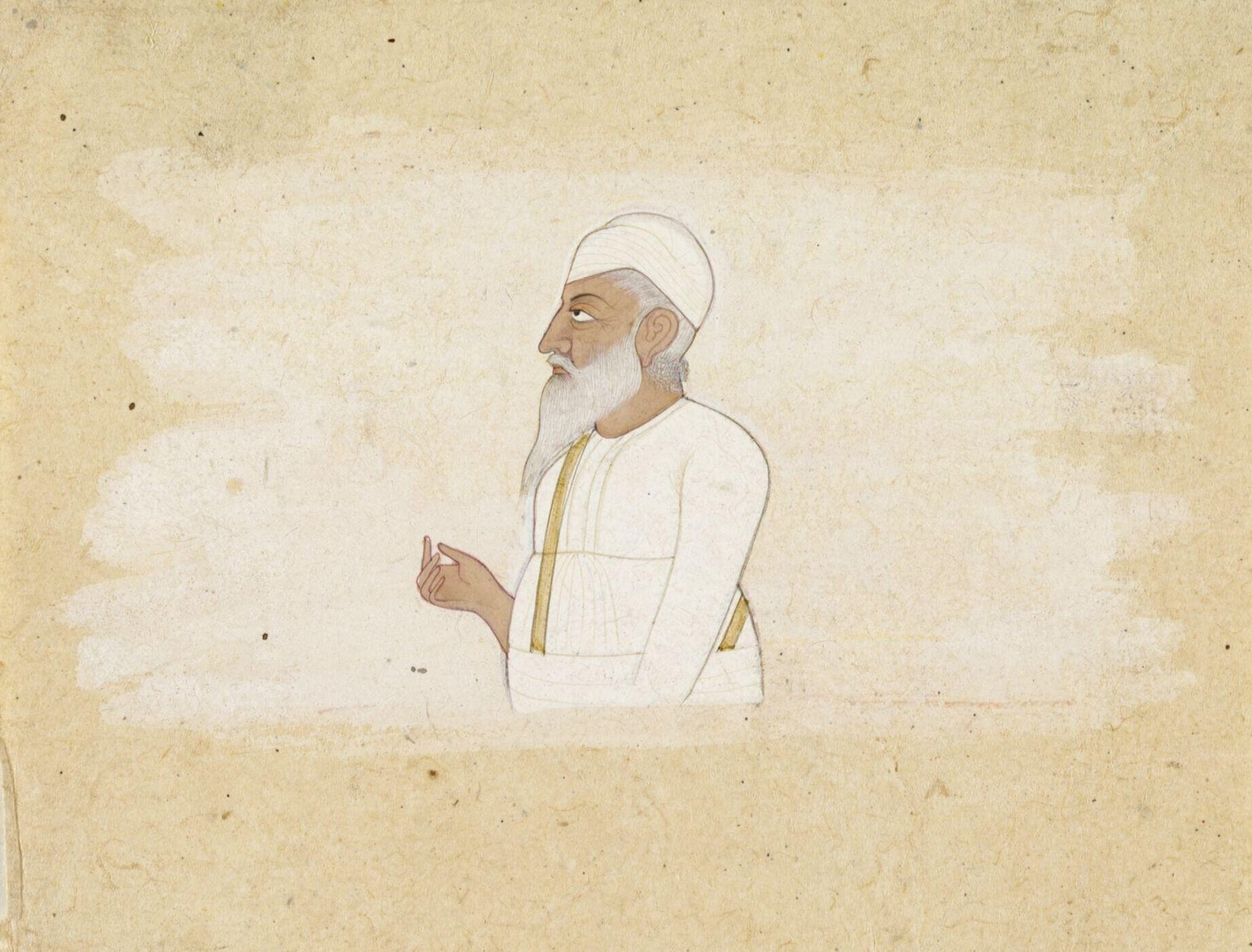
Portrait of an old Sikh teacher

A giani or gyani (Punjabi: ਗਿਆਨੀ (Gurmukhi), meaning "wise one") is traditionally an honorific Sikh title used by someone learned in Sikhism, often someone who leads the congregation in prayers, and it is now an academic qualification in Punjabi language and literature.

The word gyan means "knowledge" in Punjabi, being a derivative of the Sanskrit word jnana. So a "gyani" is one who has spiritual and religious knowledge and can help the congregation, the Sadh Sangat, in understanding the Sacred Texts and the history of the religion. The term is also used to refer to a puritanical and scripturalist order or sect amongst the Sikhs.

The term is also used to refer to a traditional Sikh intellectual tradition which produced literature and operated educational institutions. The tradition traces itself to Guru Gobind Singh's activities at Talwandi Sabo, now marked by Takht Damdama Sahib. Notable Sikhs who were associated with this tradition include Giani Hazara Singh, Giani Bishan Singh, and Gurbachan Singh Bhindranwale.

== Giani Sampardai ==
=== History ===
The term Giani can be used in a historical sense to refer to a traditional order (sampardaya) of the Sikhs, known as the Gianis or Giani Sampardai. The Gianian Bunga in Amritsar was associated with this order. The Gianis originated from the Sikh practice of conducting discourses on their scriptures, engaging in scriptural interpretation. Practitioners of this tradition eventually begun to be called Gianis with honourifical prefixes such as Sant or Bhai being appended to their name. They trace their origin to Bhai Mani Singh and Baba Deep Singh at Damdama Sahib. They claimed to originate from an instruction given by Guru Gobind Singh. As per Megh Singh in his Bhāī Sāhib Candrikā (MS 279, Guru Nanak Dev University):

Srī mukhavāka bhāī manī singha prati. Doharā.
ādi grantha ke aratha kī rahī rīta guru pāhi.
Aba tuma ko bakhasī hamai pragaṭa karo jaga māhi.

— Megh Singh
Translation:

From the Exalted Mouth [of Guru Gobind Singh] to Bhai Mani Singh. Dohara meter:
‘The tradition of expounding the meanings of the Ādi Granth had remained with the Guru; now, having been graciously entrusted to you, make it manifest in the world.

— Jvala Singh

Guru Gobind Singh conducted the compilation of various scriptural manuscripts at Talwandi Sabo. As per the early 19th century text Shahīd Bilās, when Guru Gobind Singh travelled southward to the Deccan, Mani Singh composed stories (sākhīān) to lift the spirits of the Sikhs in the north who were sad about the guru's departure, which marked the beginning of Mani Singh's career as a teacher and writer in Amritsar. In 1726, Deep Singh prepared four copies of the Sikh scripture, Guru Granth Sahib, and dispatched a copy each to the Akal Takht in Amritsar, Kesgarh Sahib in Anandpur, Hazur Sahib in Nanded, and Sach Khand in Patna, also preparing anthologies on the scripture to be recited on a daily-basis. After the martyrdom of Deep Singh, his work was continued by Gurbakhsh Singh, Surat Singh, and Bhai Gurdas. Notable figures of this order include Bhai Sant Singh and his son, Bhai Gurmukh Singh. Originally based on simplistic language and style, the tradition later became influenced by the Nirmalas, such as in regards to word and verses interpretation and the usage of a Puranic and mythical corpus in conjunction with traditional Sikh histories.

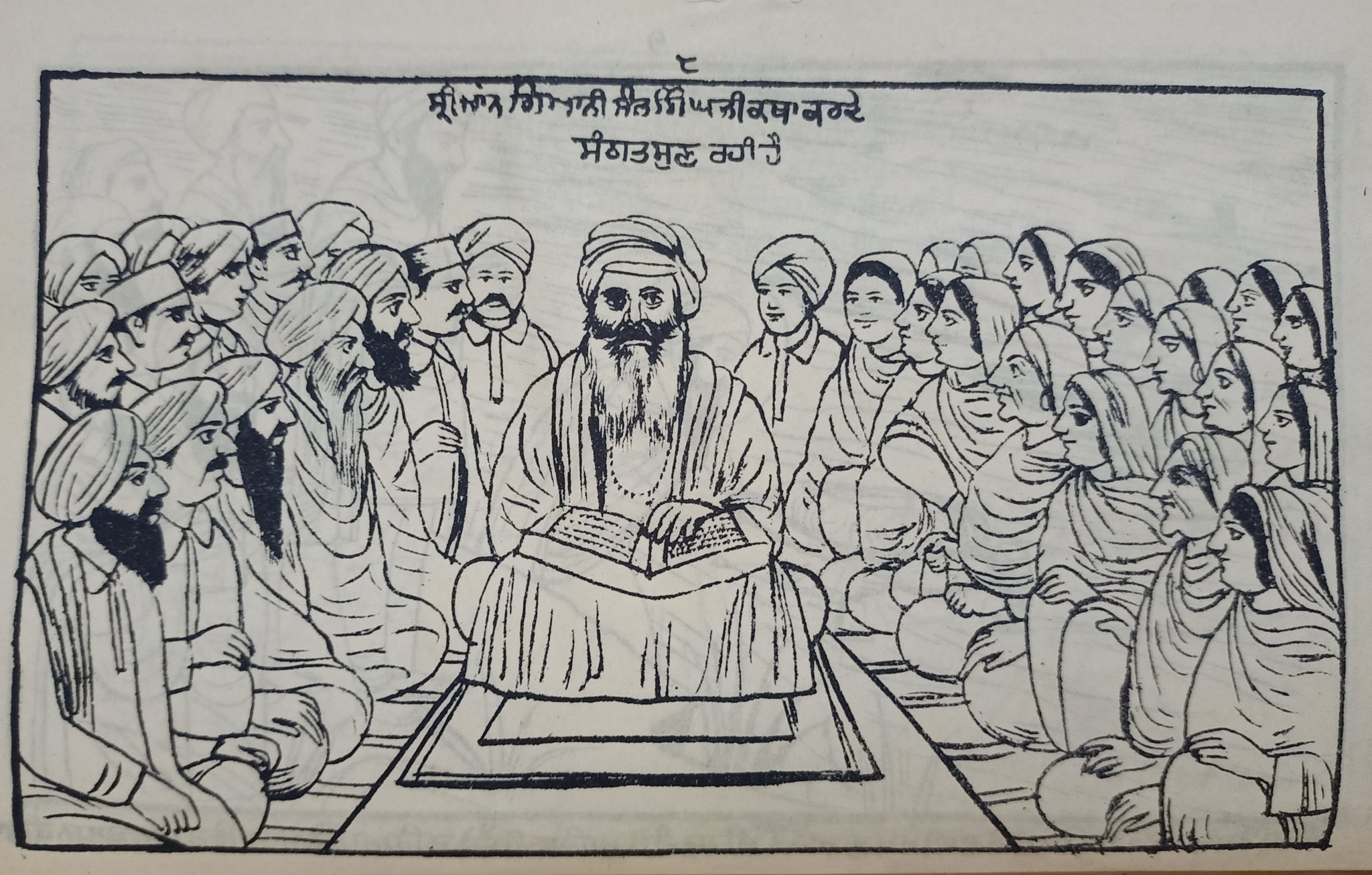
Illustration of Giani Bhai Sant Singh of the Gianian Bunga delivering a homily (katha) of gurbani (Sikh scripture) to the sangat (congregation) at Amritsar

A number of giani families skilled as exagetes (focused on reading, memorizing, transcribing, and expounding upon Sikh literature and scriptures) were residing and operating in Amritsar, the most notable of which was the lineage of Bhai Ram Singh, whose family was originally from Chiniot in Jhang district but he shifted to Multan in the early 18th century and ultimately to Amritsar, where his descendants were based out of. Bhai Ram Singh is believed to have received his pahul baptism from Guru Gobind Singh. A Gurmukhi school that operated in Amritsar was associated with Bhai Ram Singh. Ram Singh's son was Bhai Surat Singh, who had two sons named Bhai Gurdas Singh and Bhai Sant Singh. Over the generations, these giani lineages would perform discourses on Sikh scripture, texts, and theology out of a bunga located near the Darbar Sahib in Amritsar. Some familial gianis preferred to work directly as granthis within the Darbar Sahib shrine while others worked as independent instructors in the bunga. The gianis were able to preserve the oral tradition of exegesis of the Sikhs in this manner. The gianis received patronage during the onset of Sikh-rule via the misls in the late 18th century. In 1805, Ranjit Singh appointed Giani Surat Singh, a scholarly member of the family who was proficient in Punjabi, Arabic, and Persian, as superintendent of buildings for the Darbar Sahib in Amritsar. This position remained in the family over the generations, as Surat Singh's son, Giani Sant Singh oversaw the later renovations to the complex, such as the installation of gilded copper-plates and decorative marble on the central shrine edifice. Thus the gianis became managers of Sikh shrines and worked as advisors to Sikh rulers.

An influential student of Sant Singh was Kavi Santokh Singh, who authored the Suraj Prakash. Giani Gurmukh Singh was a giani who acted as an important advisor to the Sikh maharajas of Lahore, especially Maharaja Sher Singh. Gurmukh Singh's four sons were Parduman Singh, Madusudan Singh, Lehna Singh, and Arjun Singh. Gurmukh Singh had three disciples: Dewan Singh, Bhai Gurdial Singh, and Gurbakhsh Singh. The order was based in Amritsar and Talwandi Sabo, with missionary work being conducted in both Majha and Malwa. The early colonial-writers on Sikh theology and history, namely Ernest Trumpp and Max Arthur MacAuliffe, were influenced by this order as their assistants and Sikh references belonged to the Gianian order. The Damdami Taksal claims direct lineage from the Giani Samparda, although this is a topic of contention. Comparatively recent scholars and figures of the Gianian order include Bhai Bishan Singh Giani, Bhai Vir Singh, Giani Gurbachan Singh Bhindranwale, Kartar Singh, and Jarnail Singh Bhindranwale. The Gianian lineage continues until the present-day through the various teachers and their disciples. Members of the Amritsari giani family held the position of superintendent of buildings for the Darbar Sahib until the Gurdwara Reform movement ended such a hereditary role in 1921.

Gyani or Giani is now an academic degree conferred in Punjabi literature; in that context, it is unrelated to the study of Sikh scriptures.

=== Beliefs and practices ===
The Gianis place much heavier focus on the Sikh scripture, known as gurbani, and shun rituals, with them being strict on Sikh tenets and discipline, claiming to teach a pure form of Sikhism that is untainted from other influences. They advocate for the three pillars of Sikhism, namely Naam Japna (name recital), Kirat Karni (honest earning), and Vand Chhako (sharing). They do not believe in asceticism and celibacy, which differs them from the Nirmalas and Udasis. They are further differentiated from the Nirmalas as they reject the Vedas completely as a source of knowledge or inspiration. The Gianis believe in the Khalsa and the innovations of Guru Gobind Singh. They were influenced by Vedanta.

=== Literature ===
The Giani order produced a sum of Sikh literature, with some works being associated with them being:

- Gian Ratnavali and Sikhan-di-Bhagatmala, sister-texts attributed to Bhai Mani Singh
- Gurbilās Pātśāhī Chevīn
- Gurbilās Pātśāhī Dasvīn
- Prayai Guru Granth Sahib, by Chanda Singh
- Sri Guru Granth Sahib Kosh, by Hazara Singh

Their exegetical works usually focused upon the meaning of verses, sometimes also words.

== Characteristics and education ==
A gyani can be a male or a female, as the Sikh religion gives equal rights to both sexes. He or she will have undergone an intensive course of study and evaluation at an academic or religious institute, will have a thorough knowledge of the Guru Granth Sahib, the Sikh Holy Scripture, and will have the ability to translate the words of sacred text into simple everyday language. Gyanis can also communicate in English (not always the case), a major bonus to western children who are not fluent in Punjabi or Gurmukhi, the language of the holy scriptures. In religious contexts, a gyani may also be called a brahm gyani.

The indigenous education system, as noted by G. W. Leitner in 1882, consisted of the following progression: If a student wanted to progress from studentship to fellowship (becoming a bhai), it was compulsory for them to study the Guru Granth Sahib, the Dasam Granth, Gurmukhi grammar, Pingal (Gurmukhi prosody), Itihas (history), arithematic, and Sanskrit elements. To progress further, education was required in the Gurmukhi adaptations and translations of Niaya, Vedanta, and Pratigant. The highest level in the education system was that of a Giani or I'rfan, who could explain theology and philosophy in the local vernacular as a preacher to the masses. In the colonial period, the Oriental College, Lahore offered Punjabi courses in Romanisation and Gurmukhi in Vidwan, Budhiman, and Gyani.

== Notable people known as 'gyani' ==
- Sant Giani Jarnail Singh Ji Bhindranwale, Political leader, 14th Jathedar of Damdami Taksal
- Giani Sant Singh Maskeen, Sikh Ratan
- Giani Balwant Singh Nandgarh, kh politician and Jathedar of Takht Sri Damdama Sahib, one of five seats of temporal authority of Sikhism
- Giani Dhanwant Singh Sital (1912–1980), Punjabi writer
- Giani Ditt Singh (ca. 1850–1901), historian, scholar, poet, editor and an eminent Singh Sabha reformer
- Giani Gian Singh Nihang, Sikh scholar and martial artist, belong to Nihang order
- Giani Gurbachan Singh (born 1948), the 30th Jathedar of Akal Takht
- Giani Gurdit Singh (1923–2007), one of the greatest contemporary writers in Punjabi
- Giani Gurmukh Singh Musafir, first Chief Minister of Punjab
- Giani Pritam Singh Dhillon, freedom fighter and prominent member of the Ghadar Party
- Giani Zail Singh (1916–1994), the seventh President of India, serving from 1982 to 1987
- Pratap Singh Giani (also Partap Singh Gyani, 1855–1920), Sikh academic, scholar and calligraphist

== See also ==
- Sikh titles
