= Sikh titles =

Sikh titles are positions or honorifics appended to the names of members of the Sikh community. Their form may be prefixes or suffixes to names, or the title may be used alone, in place of the name. They may denote social status or relationship, occupational field, or religious standing. When used as a form of address, they are often intended to convey respect or esteem.

== History ==
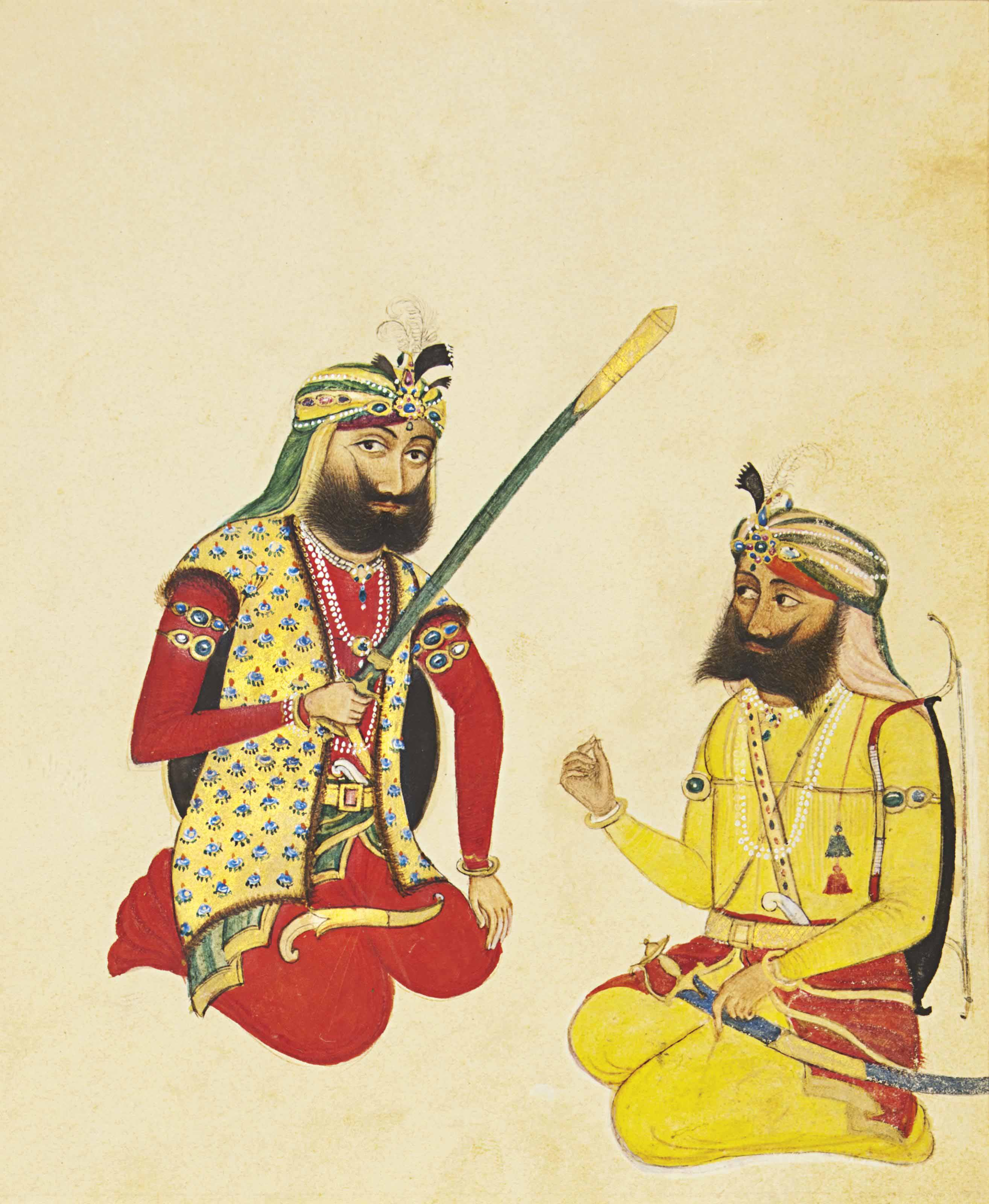
Two Sikh noblemen, Punjab Plains, 19th century

The first Sikh honourific which came into usage was the male bhai, which originally was an egalitarian title but later narrowed in meaning to refer to select group of devout Sikhs. Usage of the honourific bhai declined in the 18th century and was replaced with sardar. After the formation of the Sikh Confederacy in 1748, the title Jathedar began to fall into disuse from that point onwards, as leaders of Sikh misls preferred the term Sardar to refer to themselves, due to Afghan influence. Sardar was originally a Persian honourific introduced by the Mughals in India used to refer to men who were princes, noblemen, aristocrats, or the head, chiefs or leaders of a tribe or group. In 19th century Punjab, the honourifics Bhai, Baba, Sant, and rarely Guru (usually used for descendants of the Sikh gurus or the Nirmalas), were appended to the names of revered Sikh holy-men. In 1883, Richard Carnac Temple noted that descendants of the Sikh gurus prefixed the titles Bedi, Bawa, and Sodhi to their names to mark their lineage. During the British Raj, the term sahib came to be used to refer to men with authority, the female equivalent was memsahib, with sahib still being used in India to refer to elders and authoritative figures. The term Singh Sahib was derived in the 20th century to refer to heads of takhts.

There were various khitab (titles) given to the women depending on their status. In the period of the Sikh Misls, high-status women, such as Sada Kaur and Raj Kaur, were given the title sardarni and the more-general term musammat. However, by the time of the 1830s when many new women were wed to Ranjit Singh, the wives were given the more prestigious title of sarkarat, a plural term referring to the multiple women who took-on the sarkar title after their marriage to Ranjit Singh. As per the writings of the court-historians, there were different terms used to differentiate between royal-women, such as wives, versus concubines and other women of the court (servants, dancers, courtesans, slaves, etc.), with royal-women being known through the titles of maharani, rani sahiba, sarkar, and were described as purdahnashin, for their practice of purdah. However, there were cases where non-royal women, such as dancing-girls, managed to elevate themselves to the position of being wives, such as the case of Gul Begum. Maharaja Ranjit Singh would go-on to bestow Gul Begum with the maharani title. The wives' families would often benefit from these marriages, with their brothers and other members of their family often being gifted jagirs and prestigious titles/positions.

== Usage ==
Honorifical titles, such as Giani, Sarna, Sethi, or Sital, are appended to the end of the names of religiously accomplished persons for the purpose of being a general title or qualification. Another common honorific appended to names is Sahib. Married Sikh and Hindu Punjabi women have the shrimatī title prepended to their first name when others call on them. Meanwhile, unwedded Punjabi women have the kumārī title prepended to their first name when others mention them. In intimate settings, both the personal name or the family name are said. Honorifical terms, such as -ji, can be used in conjunction either the first, middle, or last name, being appended to the respective name. To show closeness to someone, the person's nickname may also be appended with the -ji honorifical suffix. Some rural wives only call their husbands with the ji honorific rather than using their husband's actual name.

== List of Sikh titles and honorifics ==
=== Unisex ===
- Sri or Shri, used as a prefix appended to a name to show respect
- Halwai, 'chef'
- Haqeem or Ḥakīm, 'doctor'

=== Males ===
- Baba
- Bhagat 'devotee': Bhagat Puran Singh
- Bhai, literally 'brother'
- Bhai Sahib, a combination of the honourifics bhai and sahib to confer greater respect, usually for religious figures who are learnt or respected, used more loosely in recent times
- Choudhary
- Das, a surname regularly encountered among Sikhs, which has also been applied as a title, signifying "devotee" or "votary" (in the context of religion); also, Dasa
- Guru 'revered teacher (of a disciple)', 'enlightener': Sikh gurus
- Gyani or Giani 'philosopher': Giani Sant Singh Maskeen
- Jathedar, 'General', 'leader'
- Kunwar
- Maharaja
- Ragi
- Raja
- Rai
- Rana
- Rao
- Sahib, meaning "sir" or "master", can be used alone in place of a man's name to show respect or appended to the end of certain things, such as the Guru Granth Sahib and it can also be combined with other honourfics
- Shaheed, 'martyr': Baba Deep Singh, Bhai Mani Singh
- Sant, 'enlightened' or 'holy': Sant Fateh Singh
- Sardar, male honorific attached to names as a prefix. For Sikhs, its often direct toward turban-wearing Sikh men.
- Satguru
- Singh
- Singh Sahib, used to refer to a jathedar of a takht, meaning "Your Honour" or "the Honourable"
- Swargwasi, 'deceased [male]' ('late' in English)
- Thakur
- Ustad, 'Master' (teacher)
- Yuvraj
- Zamindar

=== Females ===
- Bibi, in English 'Miss'. This is an honourifical prefix appended to the name of Sikh women and girls in venerated positions to confer respect.
- Bhehen ji
- Jathedarni, 'General', 'leader'
- Kaur
- Maharani
- Masterani, in English teacher
- Mata, honourifical prefix literally meaning "mother" appended to the names of Sikh women (especially historical figures, usually older women) to confer respect and reverence
- Rani
- Saheba
- Sardarni, female equivalent of sardar. Used as a prefix attached to the female's name.
- Swargwasi 'deceased [female]'/'late' in English)
- Yuvrani
- Thakurani
- Zamindarni

== See also ==
- Indian honorifics
- Sikh names
- Martyrdom in Sikhism
