= Naam Karan =

Sikh naming ceremony

Naam Karan (Gurmukhi: ਨਾਮ ਕਰਨ, romanized: nāma karana, lit. 'to name') refers to the Sikh ceremony of naming a child, typically conducted at a Gurdwara, a Sikh place of worship.

The timing of the ceremony is flexible and not bound by a strict schedule. The well-being of both the mother and child is paramount, and the ceremony is usually scheduled based on their health and recovery.

== Steps of the ceremony ==
The ceremony, though not mandated to occur at a specific time, usually occurs once the mother has made a recovery from childbirth. During the Naam Karan ceremony, typically, the father or a senior family member contacts a local Gurdwara to organize a brief ceremony. On the day of the ceremony, the family, guests, along with the mother and baby, participate in the congregation's weekly kirtan (devotional singing). The family arranges for Karah Prasad to be prepared for the occasion, whether that entails preparing it at and bringing it from their family home or it being prepared at the gurdwara itself. Various Shabads (hymns) expressing gratitude, joy, and support are sung, followed by the recitation of the short Anand Sahib, consisting of six pauris (stanzas). If a Sahaj Paath (continuous reading of the Guru Granth Sahib) has been arranged, its completion (bhog) occurs during this time.

Following the recitation of the Anand Sahib, the central aspect of the ceremony unfolds with the naming of the baby. An ardas (prayer) is performed, invoking blessings from the divine for the child's well-being, dedication to serving the community and faith, and for bringing honor to the family and religion. The ardas also includes a request for guidance in selecting a name for the child.

After the ardas, the Hukamnama is recited. The first letter of the first word of the Hukam is traditionally used to determine the initial letter of the child's name. For instance, if the first word of the Hukam is "Sagal," the child's name would typically begin with "S," corresponding to the first letter of the Hukam.

After selecting the baby's name, the suffix "Kaur" is appended to the names of girls, while "Singh" is added to the names of boys. The gyani, or religious leader, announces the child's name to the congregation. Sikhs are not religiously bound to take-on culturally Indic names, names from any culture are acceptable. Whatever name chosen will need to adhere to the rule regarding the first-letter being the same as the one in the vaak.

In the case of twins, the first child's name may start with the first letter of the chosen word, and the second child's name can start with the second letter of the same word or the second letter of the second word.

=== Sikh Rehat Maryada ===
The Sikh Rehat Maryada of the SGPC outlines the proper procedure of the ceremony as follows:

In a Sikh’s household, as soon after the birth of a child as the mother becomes capable of moving about and taking bath (irrespective of the number of days which that takes), the family and relatives should go to a gurdwara with karhah prashad (sacred pudding) or get karhah prashad made in the gurdwara and recite in the holy presence of the Guru Granth Sahib such hymns as “parmeshar dita bana” (Sorath M. 5, Guru Granth Sahib p. 628 ), “Satguru sache dia bhej” (Asa M. 5, Guru Granth Sahib p. 396) that are expressive of joy and thankfulness.

Thereafter, if a reading of the holy Guru Granth Sahib had been taken up, that should be concluded. Then the holy Hukam (command) should be taken. A name starting with the first letter of the hymn of the Hukam (command) should be proposed by the granthi (man in attendance of the holy book) and, after its acceptance by the congregation, the name should be announced by him. The boy’s name must have the suffix “Singh” and the girl’s, the suffix “Kaur”.

After that the Anand Sahib (short version comprising six stanzas) should be recited and the Ardas in appropriate terms expressing joy over the naming ceremony be offered and the karhah prashad distributed.

— Shiromani Gurdwara Parbandhak Committee, Sikh Rehat Maryada (SRM; English translation found on the SGPC website), 537. Nám Karan - Ceremonies pertaining to Birth and Naming of Child
