= Zail Singh =

President of India from 1982 to 1987

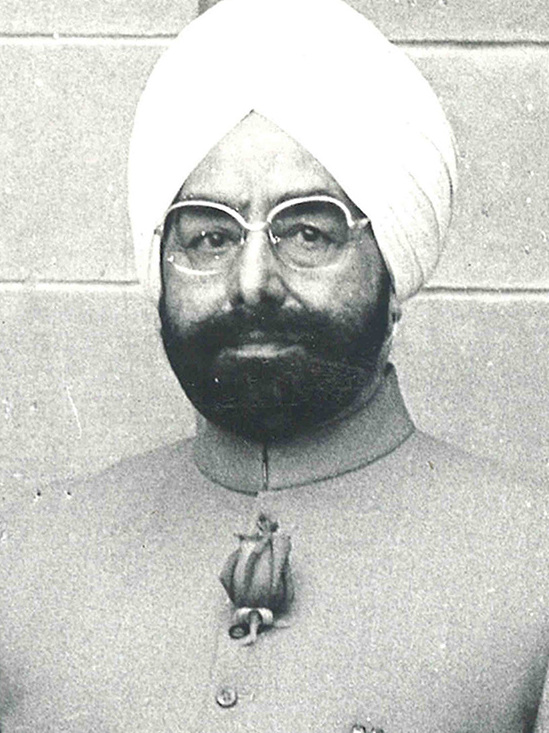
- Official portrait, 1982

President of India
- In office 25 July 1982 – 25 July 1987
- Prime Minister: Indira Gandhi; Rajiv Gandhi
- Vice President: Mohammad Hidayatullah (1982–1984); Ramaswamy Venkataraman (1984–1987)
- Preceded by: Neelam Sanjiva Reddy
- Succeeded by: Ramaswamy Venkataraman

Union Minister of Home Affairs
- In office 14 January 1980 – 22 June 1982
- Prime Minister: Indira Gandhi
- Preceded by: Yashwantrao Chavan
- Succeeded by: Ramaswamy Venkataraman

Chief Minister of Punjab
- In office 17 March 1972 – 30 April 1977
- Governor: D. C. Pavate; Mahendra Mohan Choudhry
- Preceded by: Prakash Singh Badal
- Succeeded by: Prakash Singh Badal

Personal details
- Born: Jarnail Singh; 5 May 1916 Sandhwan, Faridkot State, British Raj
- Died: 25 December 1994 (aged 78) Chandigarh, India
- Party: Indian National Congress
- Spouse: Pardhan Kaur (m. 1934)
- Children: 4

Giani Zail Singh (born Jarnail Singh; 5 May 1916 – 25 December 1994) was an Indian statesman who served as President of India from 1982 to 1987 and chief minister of Punjab in the 1970s. He was the first Sikh to become president.

Born in Sandhwan in the princely state of Faridkot, Singh trained to be a granthi and was given the title of giani, meaning a learned man, while training at the Sikh Missionary School in Amritsar. Singh was associated with peasant agitations and the movement seeking a representative government in Faridkot. His political activism in the Praja Mandal, an organisation allied with the Indian National Congress, saw him sentenced to solitary confinement between 1938 and 1943. He led a flag satyagraha and formed a parallel government in Faridkot State which were called off only after the intervention of Jawaharlal Nehru and Vallabhbhai Patel. The stints in jail inspired him to change his name to Zail Singh.

After independence, Faridkot was merged with the Patiala and East Punjab States Union and Singh served as its minister of revenue and agriculture during 1949–51 and oversaw the introduction of land reforms in Punjab. Singh was a member of the Rajya Sabha during 1956–62 and member of the Punjab Legislative Assembly during 1962–67 during which time he served briefly as a minister under Partap Singh Kairon. He had served as president of PEPSU Pradesh Congress Committee during 1955–56 and became president of Punjab Pradesh Congress Committee in 1966 serving in that post until his election as chief minister of Punjab in 1972.

As chief minister, Singh is credited with having established India’s first semiconductor manufacturing unit in Mohali, legislating the Punjab Land Reforms Act of 1972, ensuring reservation for Mazhabi Sikhs and Valmikis in education and public employment and repatriating the remains of Udham Singh which were then cremated in Punjab with state honours. Singh’s policies aimed to undercut the influence of the Shiromani Akali Dal party by championing Sikh religious causes. Following the defeat of the Congress party in the elections of 1977, Singh and Sanjay Gandhi extended political and financial support to Jarnail Singh Bhindranwale, a radical Sikh preacher. Bhindranwale soon became the flagbearer of Sikh separatism and an insurgency seeking the establishment of Khalistan broke out in Punjab.

Elected to the Lok Sabha in 1980, Singh was appointed India’s home minister by Prime Minister Indira Gandhi. His tenure witnessed the worsening of the insurgency in Punjab where his rivalry with the state's new chief minister and support for Bhindranwale prevented resolute action against the insurgents. In 1982, he was elected president of India, succeeding Neelam Sanjiva Reddy. The initial years of his presidency saw the Operation Blue Star, the assassination of Indira Gandhi, and the 1984 anti-Sikh riots. After Rajiv Gandhi became prime minister, relations with Singh turned frosty as Gandhi refused to meet with or inform Singh on matters of policy and placing curbs on his foreign and domestic travels. Singh hit back by questioning government policy and subjecting proposals sent to him to minute scrutiny. In 1986, he employed a pocket veto on the Indian Post Office (Amendment) Bill passed by Parliament. Allegations of corruption in the procurement of howitzers from Bofors, the government’s refusal to furnish the documents sought for by President Singh and his much-publicized reproach to the government led to speculation that Singh intended to dismiss the government of Rajiv Gandhi. Singh however retired at the end of his tenure in 1987 and was succeeded as president by R. Venkataraman.

Singh died in 1994 of injuries sustained in a road accident. His samadhi is at the Ekta Sthal in Delhi. Singh’s memoirs were published in 1997. His birth centenary was celebrated in 2016 when a documentary film and a book on his life were released.

== Early life ==
Jarnail Singh was born on 5 May 1916 in Sandhwan, in the Faridkot State of British India (now in the Faridkot district of Punjab, India), as the youngest of their five children to Kishan Singh and Ind Kaur. He belonged to the Ramgarhia caste of Punjabi Sikhs, an OBC caste associated with carpentry.

Although Singh's formal education ended with matriculation, Singh trained to be a granthi and studied at the Shaheed Sikh Missionary College in Amritsar where he was given the title of giani as a mark of his knowledge of the scriptures. Although his grasp of English was less than fluent, he was known for his earthy speeches in the Urdu and Punjabi languages. He married Pardhan Kaur with whom he had three daughters and a son. His nephew, Kultar Singh Sandhwan, became speaker of the Punjab Legislative Assembly in 2022.

== Praja Mandal ==
In 1936, Singh was imprisoned for a year for his participation in the Kisan Morcha. In 1938, he founded the Praja Mandal, a political organisation allied to the All India States Peoples' Conference, in Faridkot. The Mandal sought the establishment of an elected government in the princely state – a demand rejected by its ruler, Sir Harinder Singh Brar. Singh was jailed between 1938 and 1943, spending time in solitary confinement in a Faridkot prison. Upon his release in 1943, he was forced to leave Faridkot but took up the cause of the people's movement in Faridkot outside the state. It is during his time in prison that Singh changed his name from Jarnail Singh to Zail Singh.

In 1946, he launched a satyagraha against the Faridkot government and was involved in the Flag agitation of that year for which he was imprisoned. The flag agitation ended with the Nehru-Harinder Pact by which the maharaja agreed to the formation of political associations in the state and revoked the ban on hoisting the Congress flag in Faridkot. (Note: In April 1946, government authorities of the Faridkot State beat up satyagrahis who had hoisted the national flag there and arrested others from outside the state at the state's border and tortured them in jail. A hartal was launched in the state on 29 April 1946 which continued for several days. Extending his support to the Praja Mandal activists, Jawaharlal Nehru visited Faridkot on 27 May 1946 and hoisted the Congress' flag in defiance of the curfew and restrictions imposed by the Maharaja of Faridkot. The same day, he met with the maharaja and they came to an agreement known as the Nehru-Harinder Pact. The maharaja agreed to lift restrictions on political activity in the state and to a public enquiry under the Chief Justice of Faridkot into the excesses committed against the satyagrahis besides agreeing to release the imprisoned Praja Mandal activists.) The maharaja's failure to fully implement the pact led to a renewed agitation in the state in 1948 when Praja Mandal activists besieged the state's secretariat and Singh declared the formation of a parallel government in Faridkot. The agitation ended only after the intervention of Vallabhbhai Patel with the maharaja agreeing to free Singh and three other ministers of the parallel government from prison besides Praja Mandal activists arrested for their participation in the agitation. In 1948, the States Ministry of India merged Faridkot with the other Phulkian states of Punjab to form the Patiala and East Punjab States Union.

== Political career in independent India (1947–72) ==
In January 1949, Singh became minister for revenue in the government of PEPSU under Chief Minister Gian Singh Rarewala. The Rarewala ministry, however, was replaced with a caretaker government within ten months of its formation owing to political dissension. In 1951, Col. Raghbir Singh became the chief minister and Zail Singh was appointed minister for agriculture. His actions as minister include the repeal of the Criminal Tribes Act, the promulgation of the Political Sufferers ordinance and changes introduced to land laws that abolished the right of the Raja of Faridkot to seize lands of the peasants and removing the privileges enjoyed by landlords under existing land laws. He piloted the Biswedar Abolition Ordinance that provided for the appropriation without compensation of land owned by the landlords and tenancy rights to the cultivators. (Note: The movement for land rights in the Punjab began in the 1930s and was known as the muzara movement after the Punjabi term for landless farmers working as tenant farmers. The movement sought tenancy rights for the cultivators who worked on big and absentee landholdings owned by landlords known as biswedars. The PEPSU Occupancy Tenants Act, 1953 abolished the biswedari system, giving ownership of land to the cultivators and provided for a one-time payment of compensation for the landlords. The muzara movement and the influx of displaced persons following the partition of Punjab triggered land reforms in East Punjab and PEPSU. Other provisions in these reforms include security of land tenure to the tenants-at-will, establishment of land ceilings and the consolidation of landholdings. Zail Singh played a key role in both the farmers movement and in legislating land reform during his terms as minister in the PEPSU government and as Chief Minister of Punjab.) In the elections of 1952, Singh lost from the Kotkapura Jaito constituency. He became president of PEPSU Pradesh Congress Committee during 1955–56 when it was merged with Punjab.

During 1956 to 1962, he served as Member of Parliament in the Rajya Sabha. He resigned his membership in March 1962 to contest the Punjab Legislative Assembly elections and won from the Faridkot constituency. He briefly served as a minister in the Partap Singh Kairon ministry but resigned in the wake of the 1962 war with China and the reduction in size of the ministry. In 1966, he became president of the Punjab Pradesh Congress Committee, a post he held until his appointment as chief minister in 1972. Although he did not contest the election of 1967, he was re-elected to the Punjab Assembly from Anandpur Sahib through a by-election in 1970.

== Chief Minister of Punjab (1972–77) ==
In the 1972 elections to the Punjab Legislative Assembly, Singh was elected from Anandpur Sahib constituency. The Congress party won a majority and formed the government with Singh as chief minister. He and a ten member ministry were sworn in on 17 March 1972. Singh was the first Other Backward Class leader and the only non-Jat Sikh to be elected chief minister of Punjab since its reorganisation in 1966 until 2021 when Charanjit Singh Channi, a Dalit Sikh, became chief minister.

From the outset Singh projected himself as a champion of the Sikh religion, in part, because he did not belong to the dominant Jat caste and also to counter the Akali Dal party. As part of this policy, he inaugurated the Guru Gobind Singh Marg – a highway linking Punjab’s most prominent gurudwaras, renamed several government hospitals after Sikh gurus, started the Guru Nanak Dev University in Amritsar and renamed a town near Chandigarh after one of Guru Gobind Singh’s sons. In response to their electoral setbacks, Akali Dal politicians gathered at Anandpur Sahib in October 1972 and passed a resolution demanding greater autonomy to Punjab and self-determination for the Sikhs.

Singh’s government enacted the Punjab Land Reforms Act, 1972, which fixed land ceilings at 18 acres (7.3 ha) per family. Several key provisions of the Act were struck down the following year by the Punjab and Haryana High Court prompting a further appeal by the state government in India's Supreme Court. The Act, which also provided for redistribution of surplus land, failed in its implementation and consequently there was little change in land ownership.

Singh introduced a scheme for life-long pension for participants in India’s independence movement. In 1974, he repatriated the remains of Udham Singh from the United Kingdom which were then taken in a procession to Punjab, cleverly utilising the media attention and popular interest in it to burnish his credentials. The remains were cremated in Sunam with full state honours and Singh himself lit the funeral pyre. He also took to honouring the legacy of Bhagat Singh, declaring a gazetted holiday on his birthday, converting his ancestral home at Khatkar Kalan into a museum and honouring his mother with the title of ‘Punjab Mata’.

He was also responsible for getting the Department of Electronics to establish the Semiconductor Complex Limited at Mohali in 1974 overriding their preferred choice of Madras (now Chennai). This was India’s first semiconductor fabricating unit. It became operational in 1983 and manufactured integrated chips using American know-how. In 1975, Singh introduced a reservation of fifty per cent of jobs for Valmikis and Mazhabi Sikhs under the quota of jobs reserved for the scheduled castes. The move aimed to consolidate the dalit vote behind the Congress party and enhanced his own standing among them.

Following the imposition of the Emergency of 1975, Singh zealously implemented the policies of Sanjay Gandhi’s five point program. The national population policy with its focus on compulsory sterilisation was implemented often through coercive steps of the police and administration. Singh was forced to implement the policy, in part, to retain favour with Sanjay Gandhi, whom he had once described as his saviour, and to stave off the challenge to his leadership from other Congress leaders of Punjab, notably Mohinder Singh Gill who was the party’s president.

In the general elections of 1977 that followed the Emergency, the Congress party for the first time failed to win even a single seat from Punjab. Singh’s tenure as chief minister ended on 30 April 1977 when Punjab was placed under President's rule. In the elections to the state Assembly held in June 1977, the Shiromani Akali Dal was elected to office winning 58 out of 104 seats in the Legislative Assembly.

The defeat of the Congress party in the elections of 1977 led Sanjay Gandhi and Singh to look for a Sikh leader who would weaken the Akali Dal by espousing a strident stand on matters of Sikh faith thus undercutting the Akalis. The tactic was inspired partly by Partap Singh Kairon who, as chief minister, had propped up Fateh Singh as a counter to the Akali leader Tara Singh during the 1960s. Their choice was Jarnail Singh Bhindranwale who was then a little known Sikh preacher but would go on to be a Frankenstein's monster for his patrons. Bhindranwale came to limelight in 1978 when a clash between his followers and Nirankari Sikhs led to the death of a dozen people. The Congress party lionised Bhindranwale and helped him establish the Dal Khalsa party. In the general elections of 1980, Bhindranwale even campaigned for Congress candidates.

== Union Minister of Home Affairs (1980–82) ==
In the general election of 1980, which the Congress party under Indira Gandhi won, Singh was elected to Parliament from Hoshiarpur. He was inducted into the government as Minister of Home Affairs on 14 January 1980 continuing in that post till 22 June 1982. The Punjab government under Parkash Singh Badal was dismissed and the state brought under President’s rule in February 1980. In the elections held in June, the Congress party won a majority in the Assembly and Darbara Singh, a political rival of Zail Singh, was appointed chief minister. The out of power Akali Dal now revived the demands in the Anandpur Sahib resolution and allied with pro-Khalistan forces abroad.

The factionalism in the Congress and the political feuding between Zail Singh and Darbara Singh further complicated the situation in Punjab and prevented resolute administrative action against the insurgents. Bhindranwale was able to use the discord between the central and state governments to his advantage. He was suspected of involvement in the murders of the Nirankari guru Gurbachan Singh in April 1980 and of the newspaper magnate Lala Jagat Narain in September 1981. Even though arrest warrants were issued against him, who was then in the state of Haryana, Bhindranwale was able to escape to his gurudwara in the Punjab in an official car provided to him by the Haryana Chief Minister Bhajan Lal on the instructions of Singh. Bhindranwale gave himself up for arrest later that month but was released from jail in October following widespread unrest in the Punjab and after Singh declared in Parliament that Bhindranwale was not involved in Narain’s murder. In each of these instances even as Darbara Singh wanted to crack down on Bhindranwale, Zail Singh intervened on his behalf in the hope of using him as a pawn in his political battle against Darbara Singh.

Bhindranwale's release served to demoralise the Punjab Police as they now became targets for Sikh extremists and furthered emboldened Bhindranwale. Similarly, requests to ban the Dal Khalsa by the state government were stonewalled by the Union Home Ministry before the prime minister intervened to have the ban imposed. Singh’s tenure as India’s home minister has generally been viewed unfavourably. He was seen as a weak and inept minister who was appointed to prevent him from developing strong base in Punjab and as someone who mishandled crises in the Punjab, Kashmir and the North East.

== President of India (1982–87) ==
=== Presidential election ===
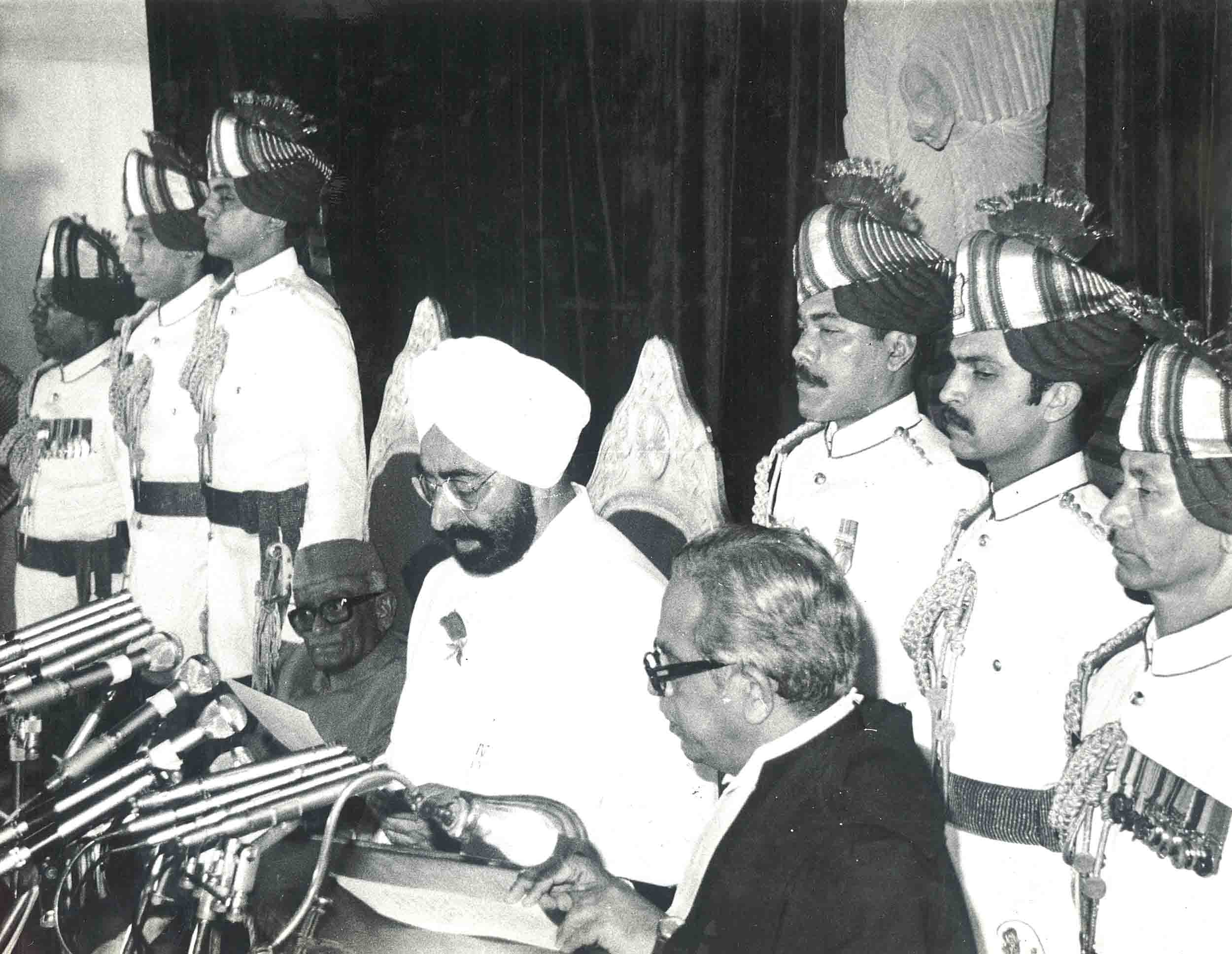
Chief Justice of India Y. V. Chandrachud administering the oath of office of the President of India to Zail Singh, 1982

In June 1982, Singh was chosen by the Congress party to be its candidate for the presidential election to succeed Neelam Sanjiva Reddy, rejecting a proposal by the opposition to have a consensus candidate. A group of ten opposition parties decided to field the Communist politician Hiren Mukherjee as their candidate. Singh’s nomination was seen as a gesture to the Sikhs at a time when the separatist agitation for Khalistan was gaining popularity. However, it was also aimed at keeping Singh out of active politics allowing Singh’s bête noire Darbara Singh to run the Punjab government without interference from the Centre. Singh’s loyalty to the prime minister was another reason for his nomination as the Congress party was unsure of its prospects in the general elections scheduled for 1985.

The opposition’s original candidate was dropped as Mukherjee was not a registered voter, which is a prerequisite for any person contesting a presidential election. Hans Raj Khanna, a former judge of the Supreme Court of India who had defended fundamental rights and championed the inviolability of the basic structure of the constitution during the Emergency and was subsequently overlooked for appointment as Chief Justice, became the opposition candidate.

The election was held on 12 July 1982 with the electoral college comprising 756 members of Parliament and 3827 members of legislative assemblies. When the votes were counted on 15 July, Singh emerged the winner with 754,113 votes, or 72.7 per cent, against Khanna’s 282,685 votes and was declared elected the same day by the returning officer. Singh won a majority in each of India’s state assemblies except for West Bengal and Tripura. He was sworn in the seventh president of India on 25 July 1982. He was the first Sikh as also the first person from a backward caste to become president.

=== Indira Gandhi ministry (1982–84) ===
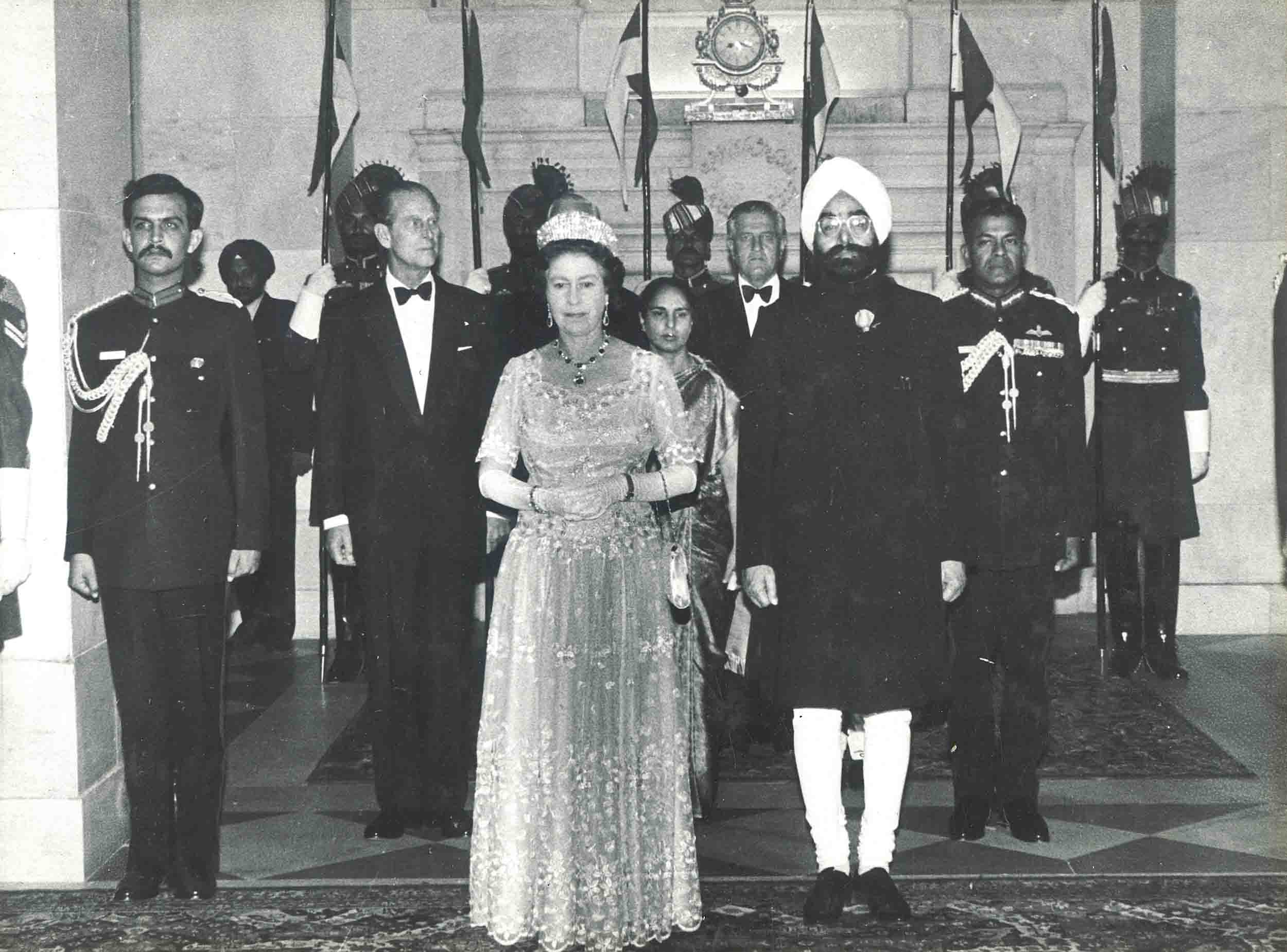
Queen Elizabeth II and Prince Philip visited India in 1983 and were hosted at the Rashtrapati Bhavan by President Zail Singh.

Singh was known for his loyalty to Prime Minister Indira Gandhi and had remarked that he would pick up a broom and become a sweeper if she were to ask him to do so. It was reported that Singh would walk down to the South Court of Rashtrapati Bhavan to receive her when she called on him, even opening her car door in breach of all protocol. In 1983, New Delhi hosted both the seventh summit of the Non-Aligned Movement and the Commonwealth Heads of Government Meeting. Queen Elizabeth II and Prince Philip arrived on a state visit in November 1983, as the guests of President Singh and stayed at the Rashtrapati Bhavan.

As president, he spoke out against the Akali Dal’s assertion that Sikhs were being discriminated against in India, challenged the rule of jathedars and the role of religious leaders in the separatist movement in Punjab, and criticised the use of Sikh shrines as sanctuaries by criminals. In June 1984, the Indian Army launched Operation Blue Star to neutralise Sikh militants based in the Golden Temple complex in Amritsar. Singh was not appraised of these plans neither when Punjab was brought under President's rule nor when Prime Minister Gandhi met him for a routine briefing the day before the operation was launched. When Singh visited the Golden Temple complex on 8 June, he was shot at by a sniper. Although he was not hit, his security officer was seriously injured. Singh was deeply upset at the damage done to the temple complex. Singh later justified the military operation saying bloodshed could have been avoided had militants surrendered and urged all Sikhs to ensure that their temples would not in the future be used to house arms and material not sanctioned by Sikh tradition. In September, the Akal Takht, the highest temporal body in Sikhism, condemned Singh for his alleged role in the military operation and held him guilty of religious misconduct. He was exonerated 24 days later by the Sikh high priests after he expressed contrition and sought forgiveness before the Akal Takht for the ‘unfortunate incidents’ that had happened there.

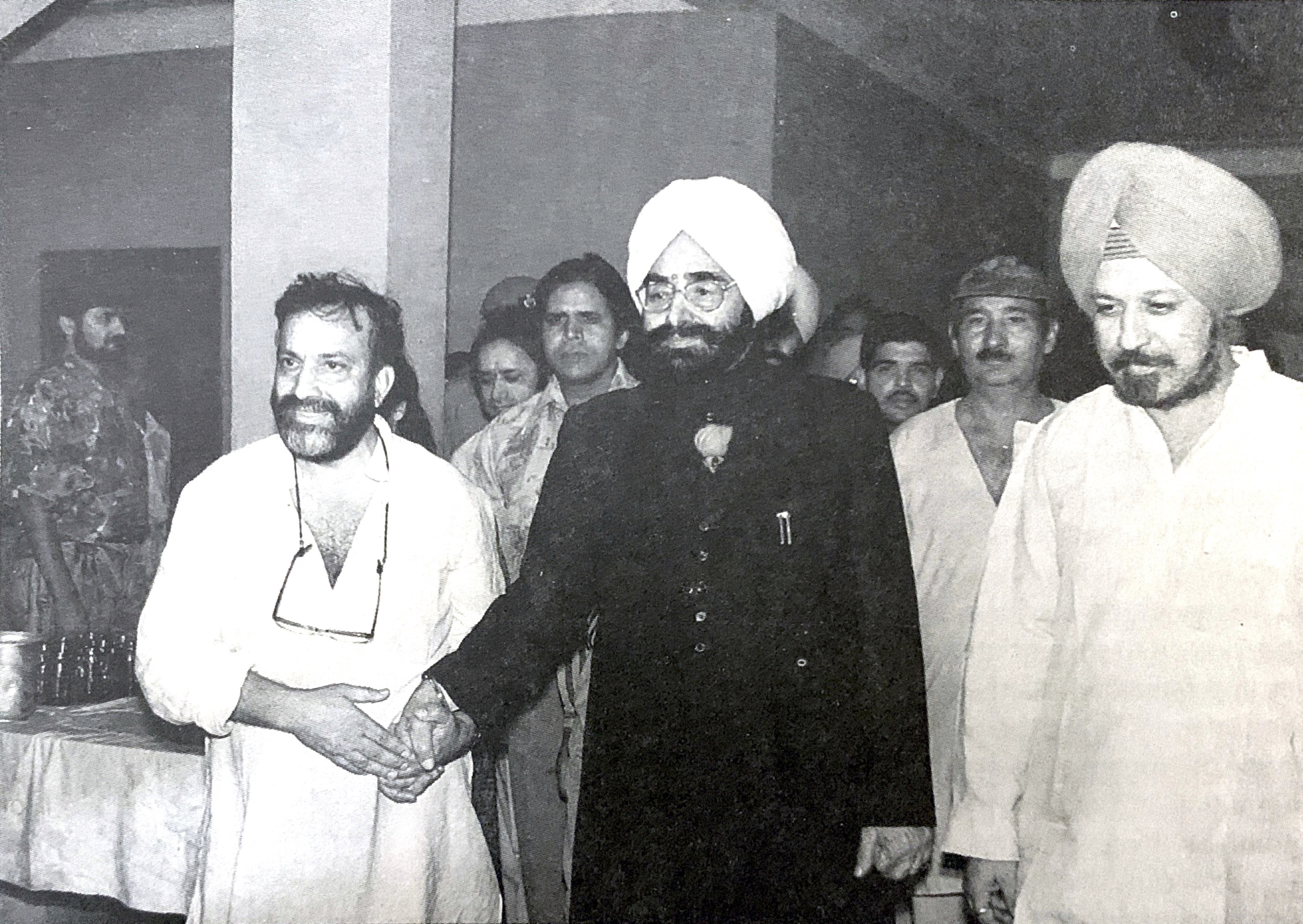
President Zail Singh with Panthers Party founder Bhim Singh at the Rashtrapati Bhavan

In August 1984, Rashtrapati Bhavan became the venue of an unusual political gathering when N. T. Rama Rao, who had been dismissed as chief minister of Andhra Pradesh by the governor, met Singh with over 160 members of the Legislative Assembly. The Governor Thakur Ram Lal had appointed N. Bhaskara Rao as the new chief minister and provided him a month’s time to prove his majority in the assembly despite the ousted chief minister’s claim of being able to prove his own majority in two days’ time and evidence that he was supported by a majority of legislators. Following widespread protests, the governor was recalled and Rama Rao returned as chief minister following a vote of confidence. The Singh presidency saw similar dismissal of state governments and imposition of President’s rule in Jammu and Kashmir and in Sikkim.

Prime Minister Gandhi was assassinated on 31 October 1984 by her Sikh bodyguards. Her son Rajiv Gandhi and Finance Minister Pranab Mukherjee were in West Bengal campaigning for upcoming Assembly elections while Singh was on a state visit to North Yemen. He returned to Delhi the same evening and visited the All India Institute of Medical Sciences where Indira Gandhi had been admitted. The presidential cavalcade was pelted with stones en route and violence against Sikhs began in Delhi. After the deaths of prime ministers Jawaharlal Nehru in 1964 and Lal Bahadur Shastri in 1966, the president had appointed the senior most Cabinet minister, Gulzarilal Nanda, as the acting prime minister while the Congress Parliamentary Party went about electing a new leader who would then become prime minister. That convention would have required Singh to appoint Pranab Mukherjee as the acting prime minister. However, the Congress Parliamentary Board, the executive committee of the parliamentary party, nominated Rajiv Gandhi for appointment as prime minister. Accordingly, Singh swore Rajiv Gandhi in as prime minister the same evening (31 October). The choice of Rajiv Gandhi was unanimously approved by the Congress Parliamentary Party three days later.

=== Rajiv Gandhi ministry (1984–87) ===
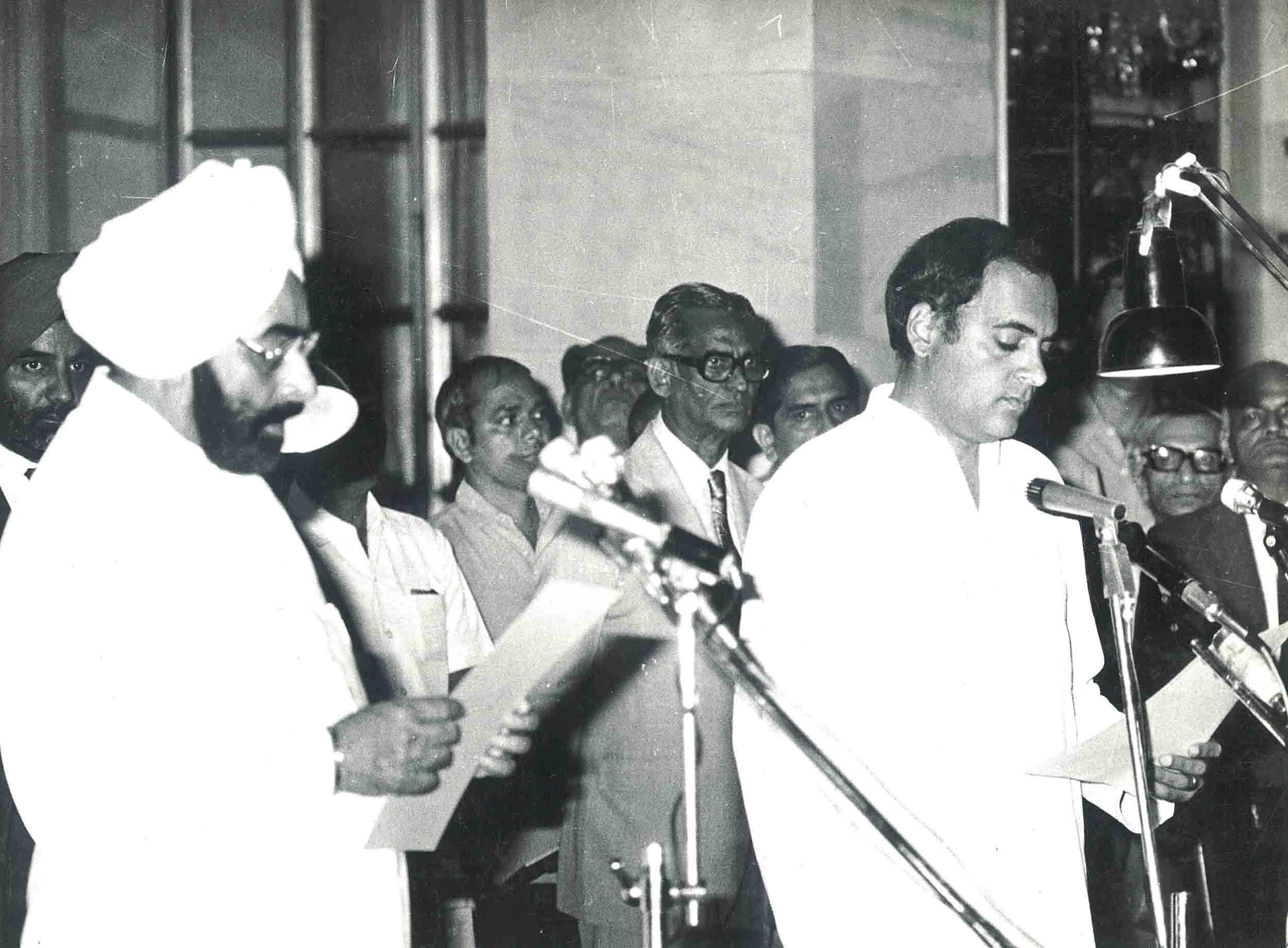
President Zail Singh administering oath of office of the Prime Minister of India to Rajiv Gandhi in December 1984

Indira Gandhi’s assassination was followed by anti-Sikh rioting across India which lasted for four days till 3 November 1984. Although constitutionally the supreme commander of the Indian Armed Forces, Singh was unable to act to stop the violence. Tarlochan Singh, President Singh’s press secretary, later alleged that although the president had tried to talk to the prime minister regarding the rioting in Delhi, Rajiv Gandhi never got back to him whereas Home Minister P. V. Narasimha Rao told him that the government was busy arranging Indira Gandhi’s funeral. Singh later admitted that his commitment to the Congress party and to the Indian Constitution were severely tested by these events but he chose to remain in his post. Rajiv Gandhi soon called for parliamentary elections which were held between 24 and 28 December 1984. The Congress party won 404 out of the 514 seats, the highest number ever won by a party in India’s general elections. A forty member council of ministers with Gandhi as the prime minister were sworn in on 31 December 1984.

The relationship between President Singh and Prime Minister Gandhi quickly turned sour. Gandhi viewed Singh as a rustic parvenu whose actions were partly responsible for the imbroglio in the Punjab that had led to his mother’s assassination. As prime minister, Gandhi called on Singh only once before the elections and dispensed with the practice of calling on the president to discuss matters of state entirely. Following his cue, union ministers too stopped calling on Singh, a situation that lasted for almost two years before Gandhi gave-in and called on Singh in March 1987. Singh was known for also attending political iftars, offering Muslim prayers even though he was Sikh. Gandhi stopped briefing Singh about matters of domestic and foreign policy and refused to sanction official visits abroad for Singh and Congress governments in the states began to put off visits by the president. Singh retaliated by subjecting all proposals sent to him to minute scrutiny, seeking explanations from the government on not formulating a policy on judicial appointments, questioning its television coverage policy and cautioning the governor of Andhra Pradesh, Kumudben Joshi, to desist from interfering in the state’s politics besides seeking an explanation from the Chief Election Commissioner of India about the delay in holding scheduled elections in the state of Haryana. These interventions caused the government considerable embarrassment.

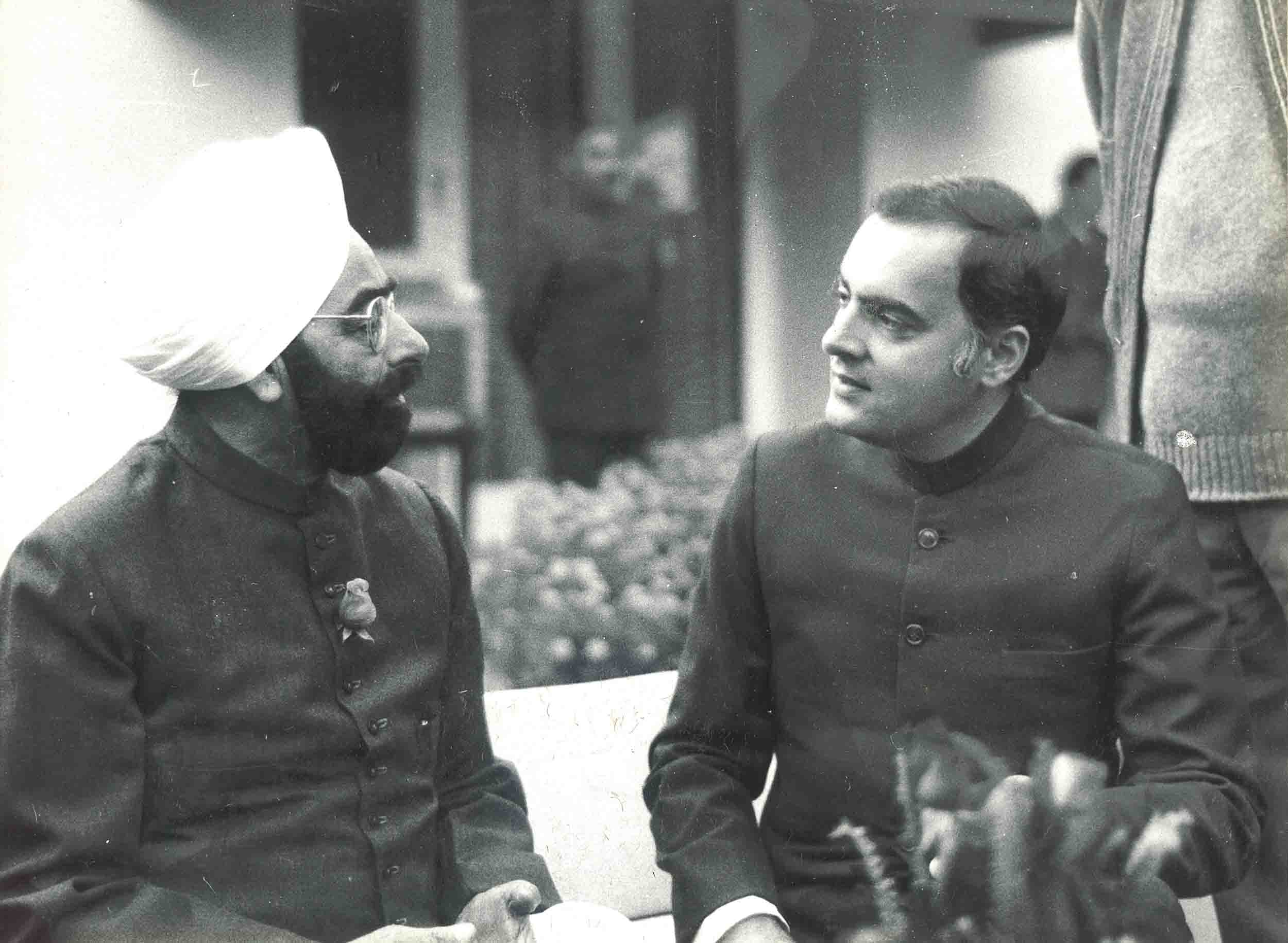
Zail Singh with Rajiv Gandhi

Singh is also remembered for his stance on the Indian Post Office (Amendment) Bill, 1986. The bill, passed by both houses of Parliament, empowered central and state governments to intercept, inspect and detain any items in the post perceived to be a threat to national security. In effect, the bill gave the government unbridled powers to surveil postal communication and violated citizens’ rights. Singh, instead of returning the bill to Parliament for its reconsideration, decided to withhold his assent to it. If the bill were to be sent back to Parliament, in which the Congress party held an overwhelming majority, it could have reiterated its support for the bill which would have forced Singh to give it his assent. As the Constitution places no time limit within which presidential assent is to be given to legislation sent to him, Singh decided to keep it in abeyance – thus effecting a pocket veto. The bill remained unsigned even by his successor who returned it to the Rajya Sabha for its reconsideration. (Note: Article 111 of the Indian Constitution stipulates that when a bill has been passed by the Houses of Parliament, it shall be presented to the President, who shall either assent to the bill, or withhold his assent or return it to Parliament requesting that it reconsider the Bill or any specified provisions thereof. “When a Bill is so returned, the Houses shall reconsider the Bill accordingly, and if the Bill is passed again by the Houses with or without amendment and presented to the President for assent, the President shall not withhold assent therefrom”. As the bill was returned to the Rajya Sabha, it would not lapse on the dissolution of the Lok Sabha. It was never taken up for consideration during the next twelve years and was finally withdrawn in 2002.)

During 1986–87, as allegations of corruption began to surface in the procurement of Bofors howitzers by the Indian government; Singh sought information regarding the matter from the government. Gandhi took the stance that the president did not have the right to know every classified matter made available to the prime minister or the Council of Ministers and the Cabinet passed a resolution rejecting Singh’s demand. In Parliament, however, Gandhi stated that the "president was being fully informed", a patently false statement. Singh responded by writing to the prime minister narrating specific instances where no information had been furnished despite repeated demands. A copy of the letter was leaked to the press. This allegation by the head of state against the head of government served to further reduce the government’s credibility.

By 1987, it was widely speculated that Singh intended to dismiss the Rajiv Gandhi ministry and appoint in its place a caretaker ministry under either R. Venkataraman or P. V. Narasimha Rao. As Singh’s tenure was drawing to a close, it was thought that such a move would lead to a second term in office for him with support from the opposition and members of the Congress party opposed to Gandhi. Gandhi, who had strained relations with the Chief of the Army Staff Krishnaswamy Sundarji and his Defence Minister Arun Singh, was opposed to giving Singh a further term in office. Singh, however, never acted on the plan and decided not to seek a second term as he failed to get the open support of the opposition and feared it could lead to an army takeover.

=== State visits ===
Singh led state visits to Bahrain, Czechoslovakia, and Qatar in 1983; to Argentina, Mauritius, Mexico, North and South Yemen in 1984. Singh was in Aden, Yemen when Indira Gandhi was assassinated. He also made visits to Greece, Nepal, Poland, and Yugoslavia 1986. As the relationship between Rajiv Gandhi and Singh soured, the government began sending Vice-President R. Venkataraman on trips abroad in place of Singh. Even visits to nations which were customarily made by the head of state began to be made by the vice-president or the prime minister and some, such as a visit to Zimbabwe, which had been finalised were cancelled. Consequently, Singh became one of the least travelled presidents of India.

== Later life and death ==
Singh was succeeded to the presidency by Ramaswamy Venkataraman, who was sworn in on 25 July 1987. Singh chose to spend his retirement in Delhi where the government provided him with a bungalow on Circular Road.

Singh was severely injured in a road accident when his car collided with a truck at Kiratpur Sahib in the Ropar district of Punjab on 29 November 1994. He was admitted to the Postgraduate Institute of Medical Education and Research in Chandigarh where he died on 25 December 1994, aged 78. The Government of India declared 7 days of national mourning. His cremation was held on 26 December in Delhi where his samadhi is located at Ekta Sthal.

Singh's autobiography, The Memoirs of Giani Zail Singh, was published in 1996.

== Commemoration ==
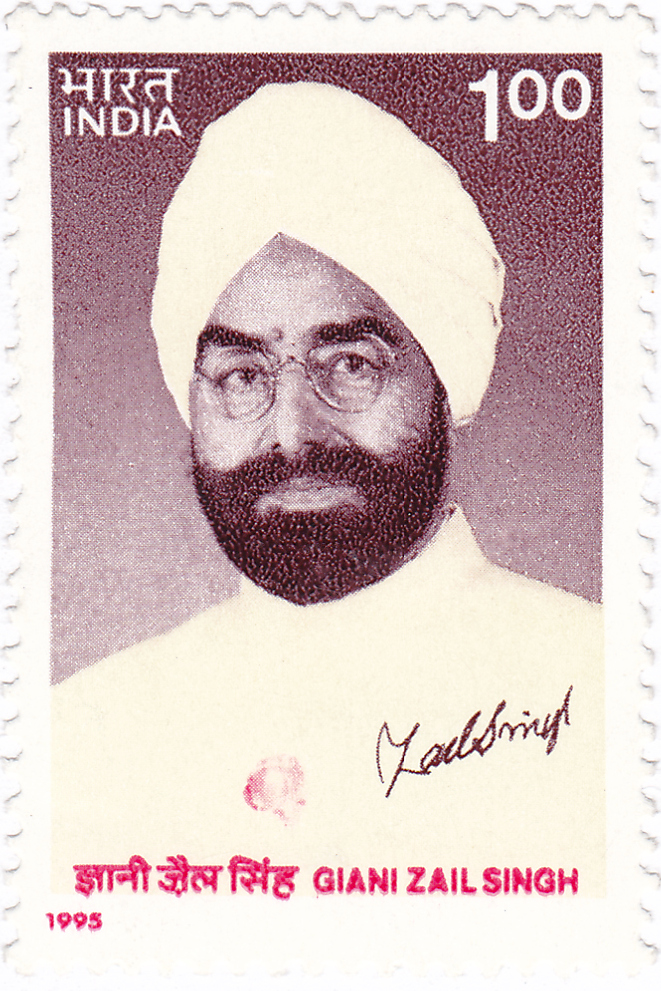
Zail Singh on 100 paise Indian stamp issued in 1995

A commemorative postage stamp was issued by India's Department of Posts on the occasion of Singh's first death anniversary in 1995. The Giani Zail Singh Campus College of Engineering and Technology, Bhatinda is named after him. The birth centenary of Singh was celebrated in 2016 at which a documentary film on his life and a book were released in his honour.

== See also ==
- Gyani
- Giani Dhanwant Singh Sital

== Notes ==
Political offices
Preceded by Yashwantrao Chavan	Minister of Home Affairs; 1980–1982	Succeeded by R. Venkataraman
Preceded by Neelam Sanjiva Reddy	President of India; 1982–1987	Succeeded by R. Venkataraman
Diplomatic posts
Preceded by Fidel Castro	Chair of the Non-Aligned Movement; 1983–1986	Succeeded by Robert Mugabe
