= Gyān Ratanāvalī and Sikkhān dī Bhagat-māl =

Sikh text

The Gyān Ratanāvalī and Sikkhān dī Bhagat-māl (meaning "garland of Sikh saints"), also known simply as Bhagatmālā or as the Bhagat-Ratnāvālī, are two sister-texts from the mid-18th century Sikh text attributed to Bhai Mani Singh. According to Jvala Singh, the Gyān Ratanāvalī and Sikhān Dī Bhagatmālā rather than being the same work (as sometimes understood to be) are sister-texts, both written in Punjabi prose. The Gyān Ratanāvalī is classified as part of the Janamsakhi literary genre, expanding on the life of Guru Nanak. The Bhagatmālā is an augmentation of the eleventh vaar found in the Vaaran by Bhai Gurdas that discusses the prominent Sikh followers of the gurus. Both works were heavily utilized by Kavi Santokh Singh in his compilation of the Suraj Prakash.

== Sikhān Dī Bhagatmālā ==
The Bhagatmālā expands on the eleventh vaar of Bhai Gurdas, narrating prominent Sikhs of the guru. The work appeals to Vedic authority, with gurbāṇī being seen as sourced from the Vedas. It prescribes the Vedantic concept of tattgyāna via gurbani as a sāra. It also discusses the theories of illusory transformation (vivartavāda) versus real transformation (pariṇāmavāda). According to Louis E. Fenech, the text was influenced by the earlier Bhaktamal of Nabha Das.

== Gyān Ratanāvalī ==
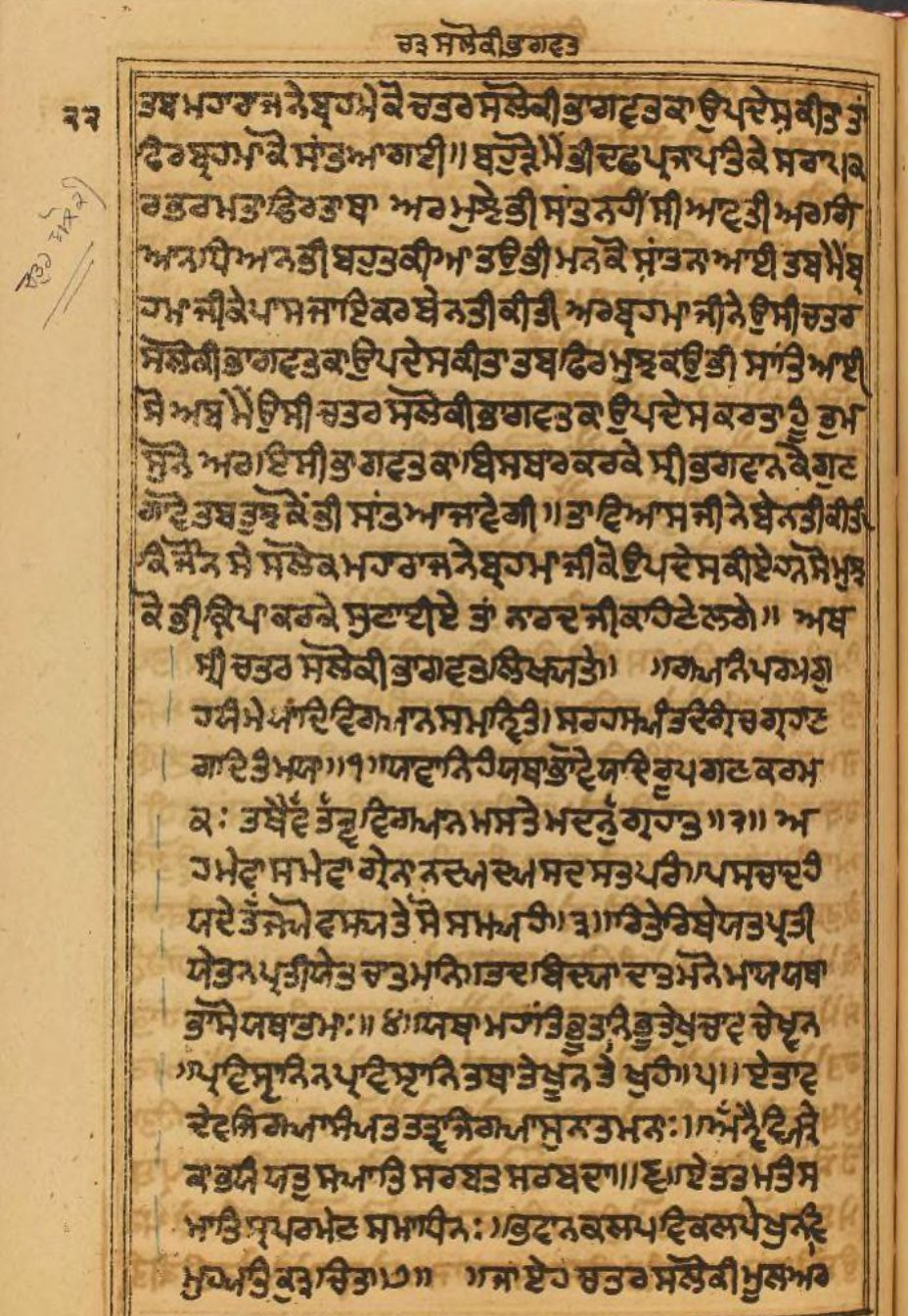
Folio of a late 19th century printed edition of the Gyan-Ratnavali

The work is an expansion of the first Vaar of Varan Bhai Gurdas. The work is influenced by Advaita Vedanta. It adds Indic mythology and incorporates Puranic (such as from the Bhāgavata) and Vedantic (such as from the Nirvān Prakarana chapter of the Yoga Vasiṣṭha and the Prabodhacandrodaya) concepts while maintaining the original structure of Gurdas' original vaar. It is the last major and latest tradition of janamsakhi that is attributed to Bhai Mani Singh, who wrote it with the express intention of correcting heretical accounts of Guru Nanak when requested to do so by the Sikh congregation. There are some doubts about the authenticity and author of this janamsakhi. Older manuscript of the Mani Singh janamsakhi have different dates for the death and birth of Guru Nanak compared to popular renditions. The language from this janamsakhi compared to Mani Singh's Sikhian di Bhagat Mal is noticeably different. No eighteenth century manuscript of this text exists. All of this has led some to doubt whether Mani Singh was the author and the reliability of this janamsakhi. It shows influence from the Bhai Bala tradition. This janamsakhi tradition makes no mention of Bhai Bala amongst the list of Guru Nanak's close companions and associates.

== Dating ==
As per Jaggi, both works date to before 1739 while Padam places them between 1774–1783. Hans claims the Gyān Ratanāvalī is an early 19th century Udasi text despite manuscriptural evidence pointing towards an earlier dating and their association with the Gianian Bunga.

== Authorship ==
Although traditionally attributed to both being Bhai Mani Singh's work, as per Padam, the texts were likely authored by Surat Singh of the Gianian Bunga rather than being written by Mani Singh himself, utilizing oral history passed down to Gurbakhsh Singh by Mani Singh, who then passed them down to Surat Singh.

== Publications ==
The texts were first edited by Bhai Vir Singh in 1912. An edition of the texts with an analysis by Dharam Singh Vatish was published in 1979.
