= Sandhwan =

Coordinates: 30°37′N 74°48′E

Sandhwan is a village located in the Faridkot district of Punjab, India. It lies approximately 4 kilometres from the town of Kotkapura, on the road leading to the district headquarters, Faridkot. The village is known for its historical and political significance, as it is the birthplace of Giani Zail Singh, the 7th President of India, who served from 1982 to 1987. His association with Sandhwan has given the village national recognition, and a number of local landmarks bear his name.

The village is well-connected by road and rail. The nearest railway facility is the Giani Zail Singh Sandhwan Railway Station, located just 0.2 km from the village, offering easy rail connectivity to nearby towns and cities. The nearest major bus terminal is the Kotkapura Bus Station, situated 4.3 km away, providing regular bus services across Punjab and neighbouring states. For air travel, the closest airport is Bathinda Airport, approximately 55.9 km from Sandhwan, which connects the region to major Indian cities.
