= Giani Dhanwant Singh Sital =

- Born: Dhanwant Singh Sital; 12 July 1912; Gujranwala, British India (now in Punjab, Pakistan)
- Died: 3 April 1980 (aged 67); Amritsar, Punjab, India
- Occupations: Poet; story-writer; composer; social reformer
- Spouse: Updesh Kaur
- Children: 6
- Writing career
- Language: Punjabi

Giani Dhanwant Singh Sital (12 July 1912 - 3 April 1980) was an Indian Punjabi language writer who contributed to Punjabi literature through his poetry, Punjabi children books, songs and other work. Born in a Punjabi family, Sital has authored over 300 books, several songs and innumerable articles and earned several accolades and awards for the same including 2 Sahitya Academy Awards. He was a pioneer who brought colorful printed books to the Punjabi literature in the form of Punjabi children poetry and stories. Sital's work has been cited in Annual report of the registrar of newspapers for India, 1960.

== List of works ==
=== List of Digitized books at Panjab Digital Library ===
- Total of 14 books digitized and documented at Panjab Digital Library

=== Biographies ===
1. Sri Guru Nanak Dev Ji
2. Sri Guru Angad Dev Ji
3. Sri Guru Amar Das Ji
  - Guru Amardas, the third Sikh guru's contribution to Sikh Indian society is unique. He is an embodiment of coexistence. This biographical account communicates Guru's teachings to child readers in an effective Punjabi prose. It is inspiring a motivational.
4. Sri Guru Ram Das Ji
5. Sri Guru Arjan Dev Ji
6. Sri Guru Har Gobind Sahib
7. Sri Guru Har Rai Ji
8. Sri Guru Har Krishan Ji
9. Sri Guru Tegh Bahadur Ji
10. Sri Guru Gobind Singh Ji
11. Maharaja Ranjit Singh Ji
12. Akali Phoola Singh Ji
13. Sardar Hari Singh Nalwa
  - Lives of veteran Sikh warriors are a source of inspiration for younger generations. This pen-portrait of the Sikh general is impressive, inspiring and motivating. Illustrations add to its impact. It is a fine specimen of Punjabi "Bal Sahit".
14. Mahatma Gandhi Ji
15. Pandit Jawaharlal Nehru
16. Sardar Patel
17. Sri Subhash Chandra Bose

=== Poetry ===
1. Meeh Vasa De Joro Jor
  - This well-illustrated poetic verse written for children evoke feelings of patriotism, and love for nature's beauty. The poems are lyrical, child friendly and easily recitative and memorable. It is a right stuff for children's literature.
2. Seetal Mithaiyaan
  - These lyrics replete with humour, wisdom, and commonsense delight child readers, inculcate habit of reading and curiosity, to learn better things of life. The verse is fluent, communicative and appealing.
3. Seetal Kyari
  - The tales about beasts in poetic verse in Punjabi inspire, entertain and motivate the child readers with good habits, moral values and wisdom. It is a fine children's literature.
4. Seetal Rasgulle
  - As the title is suggestive, these humorous anecdotal tales in Punjabi verse are rib tickling and witty and humorous. Child readers are bound to feel delighted and educated as well

=== Short stories ===
1. Ik Si Bakrota
2. Nina Pari
3. Nilu te us da ghuleyala - credit to Mohanbir Singh Kochhar for making this video
4. Arab da saudaghar - credit to Mohanbir Singh Kochhar for making this video
5. Lal Badshah
6. Saral Kahaaniyan
  - Short stories for children should be entertaining, instructive anecdotal and written in easy to understand language and diction. The stories in this collection fulfill all these standards and attract children's attention. It is a fine specimen of children's literature in Punjabi
7. Jadu Diyan Kahaniyaan
  - Fairy tales, miraculous feats, stories about magic, supernatural phenomena are the stuff of grandmother's tales in vernacular Punjabi. These three stories fill the child reader's mind with sense of wonder, excitement and inculcate the habit of reading and inquisitiveness.

=== Monthly Newspaper ===
1. Sital Sangeet

== Life and events ==
- 1979, Honoured by Golden Temple at Manji Sahib Gurdwara in Amritsar, Punjab.
- 16 September 1975, Giani Zail Singh, then Chief Minister of Punjab, graced the occasion of Sital Sanman Samaroh, day dedicated in honor of Giani Dhanwant Singh Sital. Circa 1975. Giani Zail Singh later became the First Sikh President of India.
- 3 May 1959, Srimati Indira Gandhi, performing the ribbon cutting ceremony of Sital College, Amritsar. Giani Dhanwant Singh Sital, in white turban, standing on the left side of Indira Gandhi. Sardarni Pratap Singh Kairon standing alongside. Indira Gandhi was President of All India Congress Committee that time. Circa 1959.
