= Sikh names =

Names used in Sikhism

Sikh names are the names used by Sikhs. The basis of Sikh personal-names are selected through the naam karan ceremony. Nearly all Sikh personal-names carry religious meanings. The usage of Singh or Kaur in a Sikh name is mandated after baptism into the Khalsa and based upon gender. Since the colonial-period, many Sikhs have adopted using their caste or clan as a surname and instead use Singh or Kaur as a middle-name rather than a surname. Some Sikhs adopt Khalsa as their surname to mark a departure from any caste identifications based upon names. Trends and systems of Sikh names have changed over time, with a notable shift has been the ending of using gendered name endings toward names being unisex and the popularization of including certain prefixes and suffixes to create dithematic names.

== Overview ==
Sikh names often have the following format: First name – Religious name – Family name. Sikh first names serve as personal names and are selected through the Naam Karan ceremony, where a random page of the Guru Granth Sahib is opened by a granthi (Sikh priest) and the first letter of the first prayer on the opened page is used as the basis for the first name as an initial. Most Sikh first names are unisex and often are appended with prefixes and suffixes, such as -jit, -winder, or -want. The religious name is Singh ("lion") for males and Kaur ("princess") for females. First and religious names are usually used together by Sikhs. Some Sikhs have a family name whilst others only have a personal name and religious name. For the Sikhs that have a family name, it usually consists of a caste-based or sub-caste-based name which marks the individual's caste identity. Sikhism opposes the caste system, thus traditionally Sikhs did not have caste-based surnames, however they have been adopted by some Sikhs to match with naming conventions outside of India. For the Sikhs who do not have a caste-based surname, some use Singh or Kaur as their surname instead. Other Sikhs have a placename (toponym) as their surname rather than a caste-based surname.

According to Kate Monk's Onomastikon ("Dictionary of Names"), most Sikhs have three names which consists of a personal-name, a middle-name to show Sikh identity (example: Singh, 'lion' for a male), and a clan or subsect name as a surname. Many Sikh women use Kaur as their third name but some have Singh instead if their family had adopted it as a surname. The name Kaur can translated as meaning "princess" but also "lioness", analogous to the translation of Singh being "lion". Many Sikh names are not unique to the religious community but are shared across religious lines, especially with the Hindu community, as certain names are used by both Sikhs and Hindus. There exists a practice of a married Sikh woman adopting the personal-name of their husband as their own middle-name or surname, which may be characteristically masculine, with meanings such as "warrior", "brother", or "strength". Spellings of Sikh names may vary when transliterated into the Latin script as there is no uniform transliteration scheme in-use.

== History ==
Guru Nanak is believed to have renamed Bhai Mardana from his original name Marjana to Mardana. The lore states that Mardana was named Marjana (meaning "to die") by his parents as all of their previous children had died in childhood and it was believed that a name like this would prevent evil-eye and keep away the god of death and prolong their son's life. When Mardana became a companion of Guru Nanak, the guru renamed him Mardana, which means "brave" or "manly".

Sikh names were often chosen in-relation to particular Indic deities or gurus that find reference within the Sikh scriptures, such as Rama, Indra, and Shiva. Derivations based upon Indra's name using the Punjabi form Inder were especially common as both a prefix and suffix, adopted for martial symbolism.

The names of the Sikh gurus carried special religious or martial meanings, often tied to Indic mythology or deities:

- Nanak: meaning "happy" or "griefless"
- Angad: meaning "bestower of limbs" - reference to the character Angada
- Amar Das: devotee of the divine
- Ram Das: devotee of Rama
- Arjan: related to the character Arjuna
- Hargobind: combination of epithets related to Shiva and Krishna
- Har Rai: one term relates to Shiva whilst the other means "king" or "prince"
- Har Krishan: two terms jointly representing Shiva and Krishna
- Tegh Bahadur: a martial name meaning "sword" and "brave", together meaning “brave [user] of sword”
- Gobind Rai: one term relates to Krishna and the other means "king" or "prince"

Sikh lore claims that prior to the adoption of Singh and Kaur, Sikhs generally had short and simple names. Thus, the adoption of "heavy" (bhari) personal names were for martial reasons and replaced "little" personal names, as the heavy names were "weightier" and "grander" sounding to symbolize martiality and courage.

When the Sikhs were fighting the Mughals we had small-small names like Billu, Tillu, Kalu, Neela, Peela - not impressive names like the Mughals. A [Mughal] name like Bakhtavur Khan is very impressive and intimidating. Guruji said: How can we fight the Muslims when our names are small but theirs are great, very big names? You should also have heavy and good names. Then at the Khalsa he created Kaur and Singh and his name was changed from Gobind Rai to Gobind Singh. Now, if someone listens to the name, it is heavy, it is Singh. With big, heavy names your strength becomes more.

— An Anthropology of Intellectual Exchange: Interactions, Transactions and Ethics in Asia and Beyond, page 143

Sikhs believe that Guru Gobind Singh mandated in 1699 that they adopt Singh and Kaur as part of their names to manifest gender equality and to shed influences of casteism and classism. All five members of the inaugural Panj Piare quintet are held to have replaced their previous surnames for Singh during this event. Singh carries the literal meaning of "lion" but metaphorically means "warrior" or "champion". In India, a person's hereditary or familial occupation or background can often be determined by their family name and often signifies the caste-background of the person. The name Singh long pre-dates Sikhism's adoption of it and was used by warrior-groups in India in the form of a Kshatriya title, such as by Rajputs. Thus, Jacob Copeman argues that the adoption of Singh as a title by the Sikhs does not mark a move solely toward castelessness but rather it was more aptly an action toward Rajputization. Thus, to be initiated into the Khalsa, a requirement is that one must adopt Singh or Kaur in their name. For example, historically a person with the original name of Ram Chand would have become Ram Singh after being baptized. Prevailing attachments to names like Ram, Lal, Chand, Das, Dev, Kumar, Anand, or Parkash were thus all replaced by Singh alone.

Common convention claims the tenth Sikh guru was born with the name Gobind Rai but became Gobind Singh after undergoing the Pahul baptismal ceremony in 1699. The female name Kaur (meaning "princess") also pre-dates Sikhism's adoption of it and was in-use by Rajput groups prior, with Kaur being the Punjabi form of the Rajput term Kanwar (meaning "prince"). Thus, Kaur is properly literally translated as "prince" and not "princess" but also carries the metaphorical meaning of "lioness". Some Sikh women refer to themselves as Singhnis or Singhnee, literally meaning "lioness". Both Singh and Kaur are interpreted by Sikhs as symbols to mark Sikhs' separateness from Hinduism but also symbolize martiality and self-dignity. The adoption of Singh and Kaur also imbued "name spirit" into Dalit Sikhs, an uplifting effect as it opened up a formerly Rajput title to be adopted by lower-castes. All Sikhs sharing the same name also symbolizes them belonging to the same family.

Historically, Sikh personal-names were not unisex and different forms of the same name varied based on gender in-order to mark one's gender. For example, names using the element gian as a basis would be given as a name in the form of Gian to males and Giano (with an -o added to the end) to females. Historical Punjabi names followed different naming customs depending on if the name was masculine or feminine.

- Old Punjabi masculine names: usually ended with a consonant-sound or with -a, -u, or -er sound
  - Examples for -a: Karta, Boota, Gyana, Kapura, Dhanna, Buddha, Nikka, Dharma, Karma, Atma, Kishna, Bishna, Brahma, Jugga
  - Examples for -u: Persu, Mittu, Chittu, Nandu, Beeru, Telu, Bansu, Nathu
  - Examples for -er: Gujjer, Inder, Ishwer, Joginder, Gheecher, Bikker, Sunder, Pakher
  - Examples for consonant-ending: Sirdool, Mullen, Bukken, Chunnen, Thummen, Nanak, Manak, Jodh, Arjun, Gobind, Chand
- Old Punjabi feminine names: often ended with an -an (nasalized n), -ee/i, or -o sound (Note: Versions of the same -an names used outside of Punjab simply ended with the "a" sound and not with the nasalized "an" sound.)
  - Examples for -an: Jindan, Indran, Kaulan, Acchran, Meeran, Taran, Jeetan, Ranjitan, Roopan, Sodhan
  - Examples for -ee/i: Rami, Nikki, Nandi, Santi, Bunti, Rakhi, Rajji, Bibi, Indie, Kaati, Rupi, Nihali, Dhanni, Nanki, Janki
  - Examples for -o: Gulabo, Punjabo, Tejo, Rajo, Bunto, Chinto, Maro, Nando, Billo, Indo, Dilipo, Rupo, Dhanno, Kishno, Kahno

Sometimes a Punjabi person's name would change based on their success, power, finances, and social-standing, especially prior to when Punjabis began recording their names through writing. Male names ending with -u were seen as more informal, those ending with -a had higher status, whilst those lacking a vowel ending and with attachments appended to the name like Raj or Das earned the greatest clout at the time. Thus, a Punjabi born originally with the name Desu may have been known as Desa as they grew richer and more important, perhaps being called Des Raj if they became very powerful and respected. This led to the coining of a saying: Persu, Persa, Pers Ram, es maya ke tin nam. Ordinary people and servants were addressed by a single name whilst those with higher-status were addressed by two names with the -ji honorific. Richard Carnac Temple writing in 1883 noted that the descendants of the Sikh gurus had the titles/names Bedi, Bawa, or Sodhi prefixed to their names as a marker of their lineage.

However, in the latter half of the 20th century the practice of categorizing names as masculine or feminine based on their ending and resultantly choosing them respectively for a son or daughter ceased to be followed and now Sikh personal names are unisex. Thus, using the earlier example, today both males and females would be given Gian as their name, without any distinction based on their gender. Therefore, the part of the name that marked someone's gender could no longer be determined by their personal name and relied upon if they had Singh or Kaur in their name.

According to Harleen Singh, prior to the Singh Sabha movement of the late 19th century, Sikh women used a variety of titles, namely Devi, Bai, and Kaur. Kaur title being used by Sikh women was not invented by the reformers and some Sikh women prior to the movement used Kaur in their name, even some non-Sikh women, from Hindu Brahmin and Khatri-backgrounds, used Kaur in their name. The key change was that the usage of Kaur was mandated and standardized for Sikh women by the Singh Sabha reformers, whilst other traditional Sikh female titles, such as Devi and Bai, fell into disuse and were abandoned. There is a paucity of evidence of the Kaur title being associated with Sikh women prior to the Singh Sabha movement that began in the 19th century, with the Kaur tradition being mandated for the purpose of defining religious identities and constructing religious boundaries. Early Sikh literally refers to female Sikhs as "Sikhnis" and "Gursikhnis" and not as "Kaurs". Rather, historical Sikh females used the title Devi ("goddess") as a suffix rather than Kaur. However, the Sikh reformers thought that the term "Devi" seemed too "Hindu-inflected", thus they mandated in the 1950 edition of the Sikh Rehat Maryada that all Sikh female infants should adopt the name Kaur, it being analogous in-function to the male Singh tradition. This change in female naming convention was also retroactively and anachronistically applied to historical Sikh female names, whereas whilst Mata Sahib Devah was the historical name for one of Guru Gobind Singh's wives, she is now called Mata Sahib Kaur by modern Sikhs, to reflect this change. Kaur is seen as a powerful marker by Sikh feminists like Nikky-Guninder Kaur Singh, as it allows Sikh females to not have to adopt the names of their fathers nor their husbands, giving women and girls their own name identity separate from males. According to Vedran Obućina, Kaur in the past was used as a post-baptism initiation title rather than as a surname by Sikh females, with Kaur not being part of their official name, whereas post-baptism Sikh males used Singh as an actual surname as part of their official name. Since the British colonial-period, the practice of a married woman adopting the surname of her husband has been adopted by some Sikhs, which explains why some Sikh women have a middle-name and surname consisting of "Kaur Singh", as in the case with Duleep Singh's daughter, Bamba Sophia Duleep Kaur Singh.

According to Gian Singh Sandhu, another naming convention that was adopted by Sikhs during the colonial-period was the introduction of surnames based upon one's caste or clan, which Jacob Copeman describes as being a bureaucratic and institutional-motivated process. Prior to this, Sikhs traditionally did not put a clan or caste-affiliated name in their actual name as a surname. During the colonial-period, the British colonial administration institutionalized and fixed the surnames of its Indian subjects for the purposes of demographic records (censuses), criminal records, tax records, voting records, and immunization and health records. However, the colonial administration complained that Indian surnames were "too recurrent", which contributed to a "native propensity for impersonation". The British Indian censuses were not referential but rather generative in-actuality. Thus, this is viewed as a reversal of shedding caste from one's identity with the introduction of caste and clan names into Sikh names, which according to Jacob Copeman has led some orthodox Sikh reformers and laymen West Delhite Sikhs to worry about the resurgence of casteism and decline of equality in the community. Copeman argues that the rise of the installation of caste and clan names into Sikh proper names is not due to a desire for indicating one's caste nor due to a resurgence of caste mentalities but rather as a byproduct of the policies of government agencies (such as passport and visa agencies) or schools, as all Sikhs having only Singh or Kaur in their name does not allow government departments to be able to effectively disambiguate and differentiate between individuals within the Sikh community as effectively, as everyone shares the same names. Thus, the adoption of caste-based surnames amongst Sikhs is for the purpose of solving a bureaucratic problem, not due to caste-motivated feelings. Sikh religious bodies, realizing the bureaucratic problem, instead advocates that Sikhs should adopt toponyms (place names) as surnames rather than caste-names.

In the pre-partition period, Sikhs living in rural areas especially did not have their caste or sub-caste (got or gotra) as part of their name, as all the landowning families inhabiting the same village tended to belong to the same sub-caste, thus there was no point in including this information as part of one's official name. People generally knew the sub-caste of members of their community as this was used to determine feasible marriage partners, one's lineage, religion, occupation, place of origin, social status, and caste (zaat). Educated individuals in that era (tukhallus) adopted new last names based upon their town of origin, personality, or ideals. Also in that time, Punjabis could be identified as belonging to a particular religion based on their clothing or hair. For strangers one was not well acquainted with, Sikhs were called Sardar/Sirdar, Hindus as Babu, Lala, or Seth, and Muslims as Mian or Khan.

Some Sikh youths in Delhi have also pushed back against the use of Singh or Kaur as they feel these names are "archaic" or "embarrassing", being linked to Sardarji and Santa Banta jokes. G. P. Singh (2003) argued that Sikhs who disuse Singh or Kaur were attempting to conceal their Sikh identity, which may be connected to the anti-Sikh violence of the 1947 partition and 1984 pogroms of Delhi. Examples of this in 1984 is how some Sikh officers of the Indian Army changed the Singh in their name to the more "Hindu-sounding" Singha or Sinha, for essentially all of them this was only a temporary change until the anti-Sikh violence subsided.

Historical Sikh names were often chosen to describe a person's physical characteristics. For example Kala Singh ("black lion") was often given to describe a Sikh with dark-skin. Some names were selected in-order to protect against certain things, such as Ajaaib Singh ("strange lion"), Gunga Singh ("dumb lion"), and Bola Singh ("deaf lion") both being thought of as preventing evil-eye. These kind of names that at face value seem negative were commonly used by Sikhs in the past but has fallen out of fashion now. Tej K. Bhatia (1993) describes a common naming trend in rural Punjab of naming children "unflattering names with negative overtones" due to a prevailing superstition.

Prior to the partition of Punjab in 1947, it was more prevalent for Punjabi Sikhs and Hindus to have Arabic and Persian-derived first names, yet these first names were paired with last names like Singh, Ram, Mull, Das, Chand, Raj, Kumar and Lal, to distinguish the name holder from Muslims. Meanwhile, Punjabi Muslims appended last names with Islamic-affiliation to mark themselves as Muslims, such as Deen/Din, Ali, Ullah, Mohammed, Ahmed, Khan, Beg, Hussein, Shah, or their names were preceded by prefixes like Abdul, Zia-ul, Ghias-ul, or Mohammed. According to Gurnam Singh Sidhu Brard, the adoption of Perso-Arabic names by pre-partition era Punjabi Sikhs and Hindus was due to the fact that Muslim dynasties had ruled over Punjab for centuries, with Persian often being the official-language of those states, allowing for the absorption of those names amongst the Punjabi masses, including non-Muslims. After partition, using names tied to Islamicate culture and "old-fashioned" names fell into disuse by Punjabi Sikhs and Hindus. Punjabi Hindus often named their children after Indic deities, considering it auspicious. This produced Punjabi Hindu names like Shiv, Krishan, Brahma, Vishnu/Bishnu, Inder, or Ishwer for males and Devi, Lakshmi, Durga, or Sita for females. Punjabi Hindus also attached names like Dev, Devi, Ram, or Krishan, to the names of their children, hoping that their offspring would imbue a deity by doing so as an avatar and have extraordinary ability.

Some names were selected for perceived spiritual qualities, such as Sukh Singh ("prosperous lion") to show wealth, or Harpreet, Surjeet, and Amarjeet to show affinity with and devotion to the divine. Particularly favoured names showing a close relationship with the Sikh guru using the gur element were Gurudaas, Gurudatta, Gurumukh, Gurnaam, and Gurpreet. In the past, Sikhs chose names to showcase power, strength, bravery, and devotion. In the past, some Sikh males were given the name Kaur as a personal name, such as Akali Kaur Singh (with 'Kaur Singh' being interpreted as meaning "prince lion" rather than the feminine "princess lion" in this case), whereas today it has been relegated to being a completely female name.

Indian astrology was used by historical Sikhs to select names, based upon lunar asterisms such as the nakshastra at the time of the child's birth from the presiding Indic deity. For example, a child who was born under the Ashyini/Ashvini constellation would be given the personal name Ashvini whilst those born under the Rohini constellation would be given the name Rohini.

Historical Sikh names were usually short and simple, often consisting of a single element without any prefixes or suffixes attached to it. For example, in the past there were names like Daya, Dharam, Sahib, Mohkam, and Himmat, whereas nowadays these names would be given often with elements attached to them, such as Dharamvir or Sahibjit. Prepending and/or appending Sikh first names with prefixes or suffixes became more common in the 20th century. Modern Sikh names are usually chosen for aesthetic reasons and are usually not too long nor too short. Present-day Sikh names are not always derived from Sikh scripture or Sanskritic sources and are not that different from the names used half a millennium ago based upon form or derivation. Common sources of modern Sikh names include Old Punjabi, Hindi, Prakrit, and corrupted forms of dialectal variants. Non-Indic linguistic names from Persian or Arabic sources are also often used in modern Sikh names. There are some Sikhs who name their children using the same prefix or suffix their own name contains. For example, a parent with a name containing the -jit suffix may attach that suffix to the names of all their children whilst another parent where a parent has the har- prefix in their name would attach it to the names of their offspring.

In 2007, Canadian immigration authorities stated that they refused to accept Kaur or Singh as surnames for the past ten years, demanding that Indian immigrant applicants with those surnames to change their last name because they were "too common". This policy was reversed in 2007 but it unknown how many applicants were effected by this request and changed their surnames due to it, which may have led to the increase of caste-based surnames. Indian passport and visa authorities have also requested those with Singh or Kaur as their surname to adopt another last name for disambiguation purposes.

In the past, it was common amongst Sikhs for the granthi or a respected member of the sangat (congregation) to name a Sikh child in the community whereas today the child is usually named by their parents. Amongst diasporic Sikhs residing in Western countries where the dominant language is English, there has been a shift away from naming children Sikh names that may be interpreted as inappropriate or offensive when read through the lens of the English-language and its pronunciation scheme and derivation. Sikh names such as Faqir, Arsdeep, Sukhdeep, Ramandeep, Asman, and Fagun, being examples of names that are being avoided due to these circumstances to avoid Sikh children being ridiculed, derided, or bullied due to their names. Another trend is the practice of using Sikh names that suit better to Western and Christian norms, for example Sharan (Sharon), Harman (Herman), and Pal (Paul). A further shift amongst some Sikhs is attaching a typically Western name to a traditional Sikh suffix, for example Rickywant (Ricky plus -want), Shirleypreet (Shirley and -preet), Vickydeep (Vicky and -deep), or Kaseyjeet (Kasey and -jeet). Others have attached English words to traditional Sikh suffixes to form new names, forming neo-Sikh names like Pinkypreet (pink and -preet, nickname Pinky), Loveleen (love and -leen, nickname Lovely), or Bubblejeet (bubble and -jeet, nickname Bubbly) or using English words alone as a name, such as Dimple. There are some Sikh parents who have abandoned using the traditional Naam Karan ceremony to name their child, thereby selecting a name without any constraints on letters. Other Sikh parents in the present-day shy away from using traditional Sikh names and may adopt Hindu, Muslim, or foreign names for their children, particularly for daughters and in urban-dwelling families whilst the names for sons conform more to traditional Sikh naming norms. Neo-Sikh families often try to be creative with coming-up with names for their children, attempting to coin names that nobody in their social-circle possesses. This is accomplished through linguistic creativity.

== Forenames ==
Sikhs use many given or personal names, nearly all meaningful, usually with a religious or moral theme. It is rare for a Punjabi first name to carry no underlying meaning. The process of choosing a Sikh's first name, known as the Naam Karan, occurs following the first few days of their birth, in a ceremony called the Hukamnama (referring to the hymn from the Guru Granth Sahib that was opened on a random page), a family often selects a name for a child by opening the Sikh holy scripture, the Guru Granth Sahib, to a random page (ang) and choosing a name that begins with the first letter of the first word on the page. The name chosen must use the first letter of the first word of the hukamnama. If one encounters difficulty using the first letter from the ceremony to create a name, some Sikhs believe it is then permissible to then use the first letter of the second word from the same verse as the basis for the name. Some Sikh priests or saints assist families with selecting a name, taking into account the rehni-behni (life-style or spiritual bent) of the parents in-order to-do so, with the nuance being if the name will reflect being within Sikhism or toward Sikhism. Some practice printing and framing the hukamnama that was opened for the naming ceremony and keeping it as a "mission statement" for the child for posterity.

Sikhs are not religiously bound to take-on culturally Indic personal names, names from any culture are acceptable. However, most Sikh first names in-circulation are from the Punjabi-language whilst some come from Persian. Names also do not have to have spiritual meanings behind them. Whatever name chosen for a newborn baby will need to adhere to the rule regarding the first-letter being the same as the one in the vaak, as per the Naam Karan ceremony.

Sikhs often consult granthis for advice on selecting a suitable name for their child. This is usually done through the naam karan ceremony, where the Guru Granth Sahib is opened to a random page (ang) and the first syllable on the opened page must be used to create the name as a basis, as Sikhs believe that they should be named by the guru. Nearly all Sikh personal-names carry religious meanings. There is a belief that one's personal name is associated with their life trajectory, personality, and actions. An example of this belief in-action is the practice of bestowing the element inder in the formation of one's personal name, to wish for strength, energy, and respect. Names for selected for a variety of reasons, such as hopeful and fulfilled wishes, blessings, or links to particular episodes, times, or individuals.

Sikh personal names are often compounds, whose constituent components (often derived from Sanskrit) are used for both male and female names. An example of such a name is one beginning with bal- (from the Sanskrit word 'bala', meaning "strength") and ending in -inder (from Indra), becoming Balinder. Some of these individual components or elements of the compound names may be only be used generally as a suffix whilst others are generally only used as a prefix. For example, the components -pal, -want, and -jit/jeet are ordinarily used as suffixes within the formation of a compound personal name. Most Sikh personal names are unisex or gender-neutral and can be used for both males and females. Although elements of Sikh personal names are derived from Sanskrit words, the derived Punjabi forms of these words are more similar to the Prakrit stage. For example, the word Rajindra (Sanskrit form) exists as and is pronounced as Rajinder in Punjabi.

- Common Sikh naming prefixes (first syllables): har-, gur-, bal-/bul-, jas-/jus-, man-, nav-, sukh-, sat-, kush-/khush-, kul-/kal-
- Common Sikh naming suffixes (last syllables): -preet, -meet, -geet, -jeet/-jit, -deep, -dev, -vir/-bir, -want, -inder, -vinder, -pal

Sikh names using the above formula usually consist of two syllables. However, to create longer names with more syllables (such as three or four), two suffixes are added to the base prefix, such as -vinder plus -jit or -vinder plus -pal, an example being Balvinderjit, or a base element containing two syllables already, such as Karam, has a prefix attached to it, such as -jit, forming Karamjit.

Common naming elements in Sikh personal names
Element	Meaning	Element	Meaning	Element	Meaning	Element	Meaning
Column One		Column Two		Column Three		Column Four	
akal	eternal	aman	peace	amar	immortal	amrit	lord's nectar
anand	bliss	anoop	beauty	avtar	incarnation of god	bahadar	hero
bakhsheesh	blessed	bal	mighty	bhagat	devotee	bir	brave/fight
charan	lotus feet	dal	soldier	darshan	vision	das	slave
deep	lamp	dev	god	dhann	blessed	dharam	righteous
dhiaan	contemplation	dit	given	fateh	victory	gagan	sky
gat	freedom	gharch	home within	giaan	divine knowledge	gun	excellence
gur	guru	har	god's	ik	oneness	jag	world/ocean
jai	victorious	jap	remembrance	jas	praises/glories	jeet	victory
jodh	warrior	jot	light	karam	god's grace	keerat	praises
khalsa	pure	kirpal	kind	kul	family	lakh	hundred thousand
leen	imbued	liv	absorbed	man	fortunate	man	heart
meet	friend	mohan	beautiful	nar	person	nav	new
neet	always	nir	flawless	noor	divine light	onkar	primal being
pal	protector	param	highest	pat	respectable	prabh	god
preet	love	prem	love	raj	king	ram	god
ran	battle	ras	elixir	ratan	diamond	roop	embodiment
sach	truth	saihaj	peaceful	sarab	all	sharan	guru's shelter
sher	lion	simar	remembrance of god	sobha	virtuous	sukh	peace
sundar	beautiful	sur	godly	talib	truth seeker	taran	saviour
tegh	sword	tek	support	thakur	master	udai	rising
ujjal	holy person	up	exalted	uttam	exalted	veer	brave

=== Relation to Punjabi Hindu and Hindi names ===
Many first names often used by Punjabi Sikhs are also used by Punjabi Hindus as a common set of names.

Due to differences between Hindi and Punjabi, the same name takes different forms based on if it is interpreted through Punjabi or Hindi. Hindi names often include an -a or -ya sound to the end and more emphasize the schwa at the end of the names. Meanwhile, Punjabi names tended to delete vowels and sometimes consonants from names of Sanskritic-origin. Furthermore, words inherited into Punjabi exhibit the following sound-changes: v → b; y → j; sh → s; ksh → kh/sh. Examples reflecting these differences between Hindi and Punjabi forms of names are as follows:

- Chander (Punjabi) and Chandra (Hindi)
- Ram (Punjabi) and Rama (Hindi)
- Krishan (Punjabi) and Krishna (Hindi)
- Inder (Punjabi) and Indra (Hindi)
- Buddh (Punjabi) and Buddha (Hindi)
- Shiv (Punjabi) and Shiva (Hindi)
- Rajinder (Punjabi) and Rajendra (Hindi)

=== Nicknames ===
Some Sikhs adopt nicknames based on their first-name. Sometimes this is done as their proper first-name may be a source of ridicule because it sounds similar to embarrassing words, such as the use of the nickname Paddy if the official first name is Pardaman whose first part is similar to the Punjabi word for flatulence. In the 2017 movie Super Singh, the main character Sajjan Singh adopts the nickname Sam after he moves to Canada in-order to fit-in better to his new environment. In the movie, this is depicted as being an "inauthentic deviation from Sikh values and signfiers". In a short-film from the 2013 Sikh Film Festival titled Karizmaa of Kaur, there is a female Sikh character named Jasmeet Kaur who goes by the nickname Jazz in her professional and personal-life, being embarrassed by her Sikh name but later she realizes its importance, causing her to shed her usage of the Jazz nickname.

== Middle-names ==
Sikhs with clan or caste-derived names as their surname often use Singh and Kaur as a middle-name. This practice is common amongst sehajdhari Sikhs.

== Surnames ==
Many Sikhs solely use Singh or Kaur as their surname, depending on their gender (without any other surname). However, it has become increasingly common for Sikhs to adopt surnames based upon caste, individual or familial qualities, or places of origin. Sikhs who do adopt a surname other than Singh or Kaur tend to introduce themselves as and be addressed by their "first name + Singh/Kaur", rather than including their surname. For example, a man whose full-name is Harjit Singh Dhaliwal might introduce himself to others as simply Harjit Singh, omitting Dhaliwal.

The Tat Khalsa viewpoint mandates the usage of Singh and Kaur alone, without any caste-identifying surnames. Some believers maintain that the practice of naming without using the word Singh or Kaur is manmat (Against the will of the Guru) and is prohibited in the Rehat Maryada (The way of living of Sikhs). However, whilst many non-Sikhs use the name Singh, Kaur on the other hand is virtually only used by Sikhs. Thus, Kaur is a much-readier and reliable linguistic identifier of Sikh-hood when compared to Singh. Thus, some Sikh women like Sunny Leone or Taran Dhillon have faced backlash from sections of the Sikh community when they identified themselves with their Kaur name, as they were perceived as bringing dishonour to the name which is a linguistic marker of a Sikh female. In Sikhism, women are not mandated to change their surnames, last name, or family name after marriage.

Some Sikhs adopt the word Khalsa as their surname. This practice is common amongst the Bhajanist sect (3HO), who follow the teachings of Yogi Bhajan. This practice has been criticized based upon the claim that Guru Gobind Singh did not mandate that the word Khalsa become part of a Sikh name and that naming oneself in this manner is egotistical. Thus, the basis of the criticism is derived from how Sikhs are students whilst the Khalsa is the master, naming oneself Khalsa implies that one is the master.

Some Sikhs append a toponymic name as a suffix to their name. For example, a Sikh man named Joginder Singh from Amritsar may call himself "Joginder Singh Amritsar". The purpose of this is often to hide or replace a traditional caste-based surname, which some Sikhs are against appending to one's name. This is what Sikh religious bodies advocate for to prevent the uptake of caste-based surnames amongst Sikhs due to the bureaucratic problem of too many people sharing the surnames Singh and Kaur. Toponym-based Sikh surnames may reflect the names of a particular village, town, neighbourhood, state, or country that the individual hails from or is connected to. Examples in real-life include the politician Parkash Singh Badal, whose family traces their roots to Badal village. However, the practice of adopting a toponym as a surname amongst Sikhs is less common than caste-based surnames.

Some Sikhs give their first name as a last name to their children. For example, a Sikh father named Partap would give Partap as a surname to his children, replacing Singh and Kaur.

Whilst as per the Sikh Rehat Maryada all amritdharis must adopt Singh or Kaur into their official name, there is ambiguity if non-amritdhari Sikhs must do-so. Many self-identifying Sikhs do not have Singh or Kaur as part of their proper name. Sikhs who do not have Singh or Kaur in their name may face difficulties when applying for refugee status abroad as a Sikh, as having Singh or Kaur in one's name is commonly perceived as being a Sikh marker. However, there has been no attempt to restrict the usage of Singh or Kaur to only baptized Sikhs, rather the opposite as non-baptized Sikhs are encouraged to adopt the titles into their names.

=== Caste ===
Many Sikhs append the name of their sub-caste (known as a got in Punjabi and gotra in Hindi) as their surname. A got is an exogamous grouping within a particular caste (known as a zat in Punjabi and jati in Hindi). A zat is an endogamous caste grouping, which contains gots under it. Some Sikhs are against the usage of got names as surnames because they think it promotes the caste system and the discrimination that comes from it, which is against Sikh doctrines. Other Sikhs defend the usage of caste surnames by claiming it is a critical aspect of cultural identity, being an important phenomenological marker. Sikhs tend to marry someone belonging to a different got as themself whilst belonging to the same zat. Since the second half of the 20th century, some Sikhs from socially and economically disadvantaged castes have adopted the gotra names of privileged castes as their surnames in an attempt to hide their original caste-background and seek upward social mobility. An example of this practice in-action is a trend of Mazhabis adopting Jat Sikh clan names as their surname in an attempt to seek higher social statues by affiliating themselves with Jats. Atheists from Sikh-backgrounds may prefer to use a caste-name instead of Singh or Kaur as the latter is too affiliated to the Sikh religion. Some Dalit Sikh activists have criticized the practice of Singh or Kaur in-place of caste-based names as an example of "caste-blindness", which they feel is "obsolete" and "discredited", preferring the practice of "conspicuous caste". Some orthodox Sikh schools, such as the Singh Sabha schools of Delhi, do not recognize or record any caste-related surnames of their pupils, instead recording their surname solely as Singh or Kaur to replace any caste-based surnames. Consequently, the class register of these schools differentiated students sharing the same name with numeric values rather than by the student's caste surname.

Many members of heterodoxical sects and splinter movements of Sikhism, such as the Ravidassias, may have either Hindu-adjacent ("Devi" or "Lal") or Sikh-adjacent last names ("Singh" or "Kaur"). Many followers of the aforementioned groups are from the Dalit community, particularly a sub-group known as Ramdasias. Whilst many Ravidassias practice having Singh or Kaur in their names, a lot of those who do assert their identity of being a Ravidassia and not a Sikh.

== Honorifics and titles ==
Honorifical titles, such as Giani, Sarna, Sethi, or Sital, are appended to the end of the names of religiously accomplished persons for the purpose of being a general title or qualification. Another common honorific appended to names is Sahib. Married Sikh and Hindu Punjabi women have the shrimatī title prepended to their first name when others call on them. Meanwhile, unwedded Punjabi women have the kumārī title prepended to their first name when others mention them. In intimate settings, both the personal name or the family name are said. Honorifical terms, such as -ji, can be used in conjunction either the first, middle, or last name, being appended to the respective name. To show closeness to someone, the person's nickname may also be appended with the -ji honorifical suffix. Some rural wives only call their husbands with the ji honorific rather than using their husband's actual name.

== See also ==
- Sikh titles
- Indian names
- Indian honorifics
