= Gianian Bunga =

Sikh site in Amritsar, India

Burj Gianian
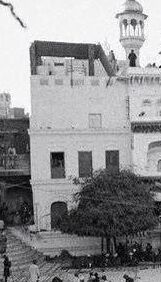
- Burj Gianian on the left of the Akal Takht

Religion
- Affiliation: Sikhism
- Sect: Giani Samparda
- District: Amritsar

Location
- Location: Golden Temple
- State: Punjab
- Country: India
- Interactive map of Burj Gianian
- Coordinates: 31.6200°N 75.1850°E

Architecture
- Architect: Giani Soorat Singh
- Type: Gurdwara
- Style: Sikh architecture
- Founder: Giani Soorat Singh
- Construction cost: 4,500 rupees
- Capacity: 50 rooms

The Gianian Bunga, also known as the Burj Gianian (lit. Tower of the Knowledgeable) was a structure next to the Akal Takht built by Giani Soorat Singh, a priest in the Sikh Raj who was the head of the Giani Samparda. It was built in 1778 and served as the headquarters of the Giani Samparda until the end of the Giani Samparda in 1921. In 1988, it was demolished by the Punjab Government. It remained the main site for Sikh spiritual belief and power till the Shiromani Gurdwara Parbandhak Committee and Damdami Taksal's arrival.

== History ==
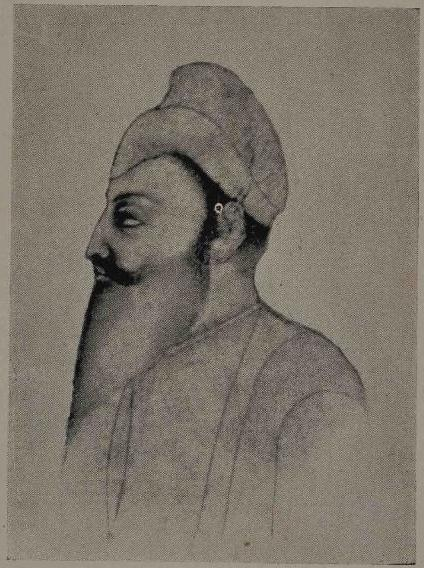
Portrait of Bhai Sant Singh Giani of the Burj Gianian.

It was an influential Sikh traditional school in Amritsar that was associated with hereditary gianis. The Gianian Bunga was associated with the Giani Sampardai and claimed its lineage from Bhai Mani Singh. After Bhai Mani Singh, the lineage continues with Gurbakhsh Singh to Surat Singh and then Sant Singh. During the Post-Gurudom period the Giani Samparda was possibly the most influential Samparda to exist, and this hold over Sikhism and Sikhs continued till the torture and subsequent death of Giani Gurmukh Singh at the hand of Hira Singh Dogra.

The ownership of the various Bungas, Burjs, or Sarais, was personal or community-based, this one was private property. They were centers of learning, places for religious and socio-political discourse, and also provided residential accommodation for pilgrims. Bunga Shahbadian of Karam Singh Nirmala was among the earliest structures built. This was the place where Giani Soorat Singh first arrived and stayed to serve as the head Granthi and manager of the Golden Temple. During the Misl era, Giani Soorat Singh commanded the moral authority of all Misls and all twelve Misls respected him and presented him with gifts and some Jagirs when needing spiritual support, the main Jagir was presented at Kalowal. Giani Soorat Singh was known for being the first in the lineage to be from the Giani family, who ruled over the Giani Samparda. Maharaja Ranjit Singh was a student of his, and so was his father, Maha Singh. Most Misl rulers sent their first-in-line to the throne to the Burj Gianian for religious studies, even three successive Jathedars of the Akal Takht, Phula Singh, Hanuman Singh and Prehlad Singh, had been sent to the Burj Gianian.

The site was built in 1778 by Giani Soorat Singh, it was two storied with a large embroidered rooftop and had a 50-roomed accommodation of 1,200 square yards with an underground path to the Katha-Wala Bunga and the Jhanda Bunga, the underground tunnels were known as ‘Sarad Khana’, as the Gianis had to make a speech each day at the Katha-Wala Bunga 45 minutes after midday; only the head Giani was allowed to make a speech. It also had a well next to it which was blessed by Guru Amar Das, along with underground rooms.

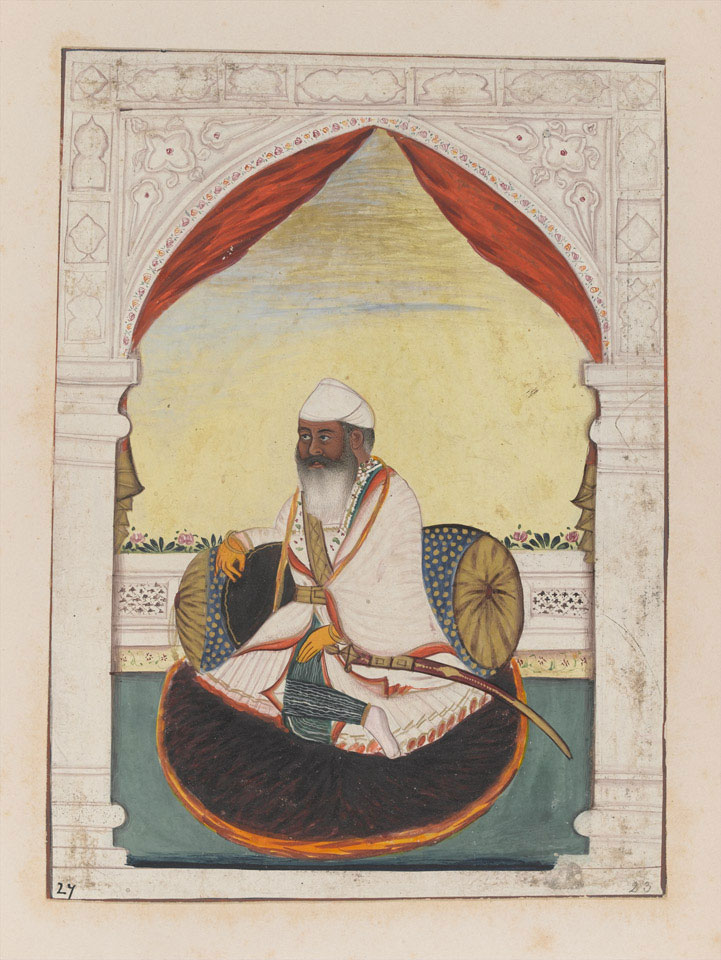
Giani Gurmukh Singh, watercolor by a Company artist, Punjab.

The Sikh Raj had been declared in 1799, and three years later in 1802 Maharaja Ranjit Singh had made the Giani of the Giani Samparda a hereditary title, hence the next to priestship was an Afghan war veteran and scion of the Gianis, Giani Sant Singh. Like his father, Giani Sant Singh also constructed various Bungas across the Golden Temple, but his most famous work was plating the Golden Temple in gold and Jaipuri marble. The Burj Gianian became even more prominent during this time as the works of Mahakavi Santokh Singh was produced here- the Gurpratap Suraj Prakash Granth.

Giani Gurmukh Singh continued this tradition and became a Court Granthi of the Sikh Raj, but when the Dogras started gaining more power he had tried to wrestle with the traitors including Bhai Ram Singh, Dhian Singh Dogra, Pandit Jalla and Hira Singh Dogra. He had assassinated Dhian Singh Dogra for treachery against the Khalsa and was supported by his father's student, Bhai Bir Singh Naurangabad. Giani Gurmukh Singh also built the Baradari Gurmukh Singh near the Burj Gianian, as a personal residence, Bunga Giani Sant Singh on the curve to the right of the Akal Takht and Bunga Giani Ram Singh to the left side of the Ramgarhia Bunga, from the Akal Takht. Due to his involvement against the Dogras, Hira Singh Dogra caught him from the Burj Gianian and gave him to Muslims to torture him to death.

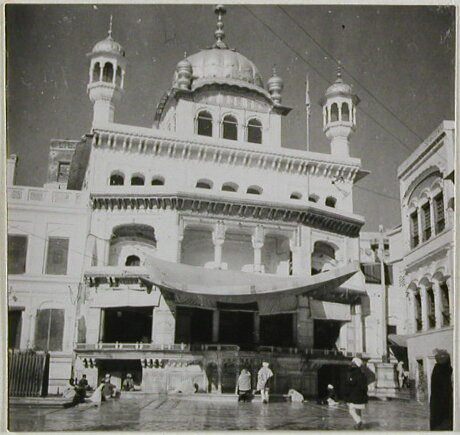
Photograph of the Akal Takht by Annemarie Schwarzenbach (1939) with the Burj Gianian on the left-hand side.

Giani Pardoman Singh, the next in line, was put under house arrest in the Burj Gianian, but later escaped to Ludhiana with his three brothers. He returned after some time and won against the Dogras in court over the right to the Burj, though he was not able to recover the other three Bungas/Baradari around the complex due to the Anglo-Sikh Wars. The influence of the Giani Samparda decreased during this time, as did the influence of Sikhism. Giani Pardoman Singh and his brother Giani Lehna Singh had founded the Gurmukhi Akhbar, a newspaper, from the Burj Gianian. After the death of Giani Pardoman Singh his son Giani Gurbaksh Singh, Barrister became the head, he was a proponent of Sikh education and worked on it during his period of heading the Samparda, till the Shiromani Gurdwara Parbandhak Committee disbanded the Giani Samparda in 1921. Unofficially there still is a continuing titular lineage of Gianis, the next one was Giani Harinder Singh Roop, a famous Punjabi poet, and currently it is Giani Yadwinder Singh. In 1988 there were four families of descendants of the Gianis who lived in the large Burj Gianian, but the Punjab Government had broken it down to build a Galliara (open walled space) around the Golden Temple for more control over it in the aftermath of Operation Black Thunder. The historical site was not reconstructed, though an underground tunnel caused controversy when being unearthed, there have been protests over the historical nature and need to rebuild the Bungas, Baradaris and Burjs around the complex.

== See also ==
- Sultanpur Lodhi
- Gurdwara Baba Bakala Sahib
