= Sant Singh Maskeen =

Sikh scholar

Brahmgiani Sant Singh Maskeen
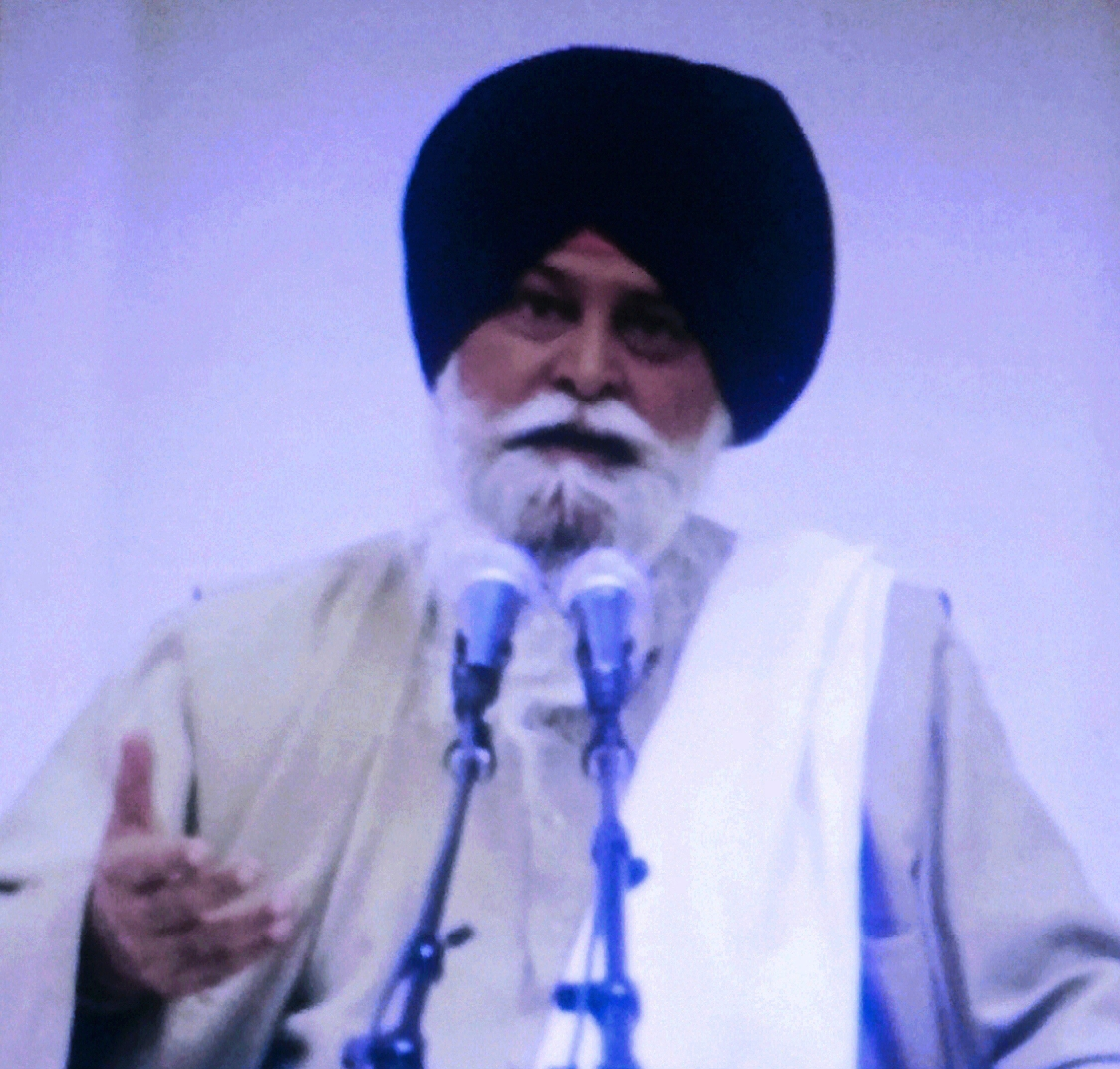
- Born: Sant Singh; 1934; Lakki Marwat, Khyber Pakhtunkhwa, British India
- Died: 18 February 2005 (aged 70); Etawah, Uttar Pradesh, India
- Occupation: Theologian
- Spouse: Sunder Kaur
- Theological work
- Language: Punjabi, Hindi, Urdu, Persian, Arabic
- Main interests: Katha (Spiritual Lectures)

Sant Singh Maskeen (1934–2005) was a prominent Sikh scholar and theologian known for his expertise of Gurmat and Gurbani. He was honoured with the rare title of "Panth Rattan" for his services to humankind by the Shiromani Gurdwara Parbandhak Committee.

== Early life ==
Maskeen was born in 1934 at Lakki Marwat (now in Pakistan) to father Kartar Singh and mother Ram Kaur. In 1958 he was married to Sunder Kaur. He had three sons and two daughters. He pursued his primary education at Khalsa School (now in Pakistan) and then went to Government High School. Soon, around the age of 12, he experienced the turmoil of Partition of India in 1947, due to which, his family migrated to India and settled in Alwar, Rajasthan. Here, he could not continue his studies due to the language barrier because his education back in Pakistan was in Urdu and Persian. Due to poor living conditions at home, he then started looking for jobs. He worked in a factory for about three months.

== Works ==
He authored more than a dozen books, including Guru Chintan, Ras Dhara, Jiwan Jhalkian, Aise Jan Virle Sansare, Brahm Gyan, Gyan Da Saagar, Amrit Manthan, Ratnagar and Shabad Guru.

== Honours ==
He was given the title of Panth Ratan, the highest honor awarded by one of the Takhts to an individual for their exceptional services to the Sikh cause and humankind through the message of Gurbani. He was also given Bhai Gurdas Gold posthumous award, worth rupees one lakh and, posthumously, the Gurmat Vidya Martand award by Shiromani Gurdwara Parbandhak Committee.

== Death ==
Maskeen died on 18 February 2005 due to a heart attack while attending a marriage in Etawah, Uttar Pradesh, India.
