= Bhagat (name) =

Bhagat can be a masculine given name, a middle name, or a surname. Notable people with the name include:

== Given name ==
- Bhagat Bahadur Baduwal, Nepali politician
- Bhagat Beni, saint
- Bhagat Bhikhan, Indian poet and saint
- Bhagat Parmanand Das, poet and saint
- Bhagat Jawala Dass Ji, saint
- Bhagat Baba Kalu, religious figure
- Bhagat Singh Koshyari, Indian politician, journalist, author, and teacher
- Bhagat Pipa, poet and saint
- Bhagat Ram, Indian politician
- Bhagat Kanwar Ram, singer and poet
- Bhagat Munshi Ram, Indian spiritual guru
- Bhagat Sadhana, Indian poet and saint
- Bhagat Sain, saint
- Bhagat Singh, Indian revolutionary
- Bhagat Lakshman Singh, writer and reformer
- Bhagat Puran Singh, Indian writer, environmentalist, and philanthropist
- Bhagat Ram Talwar, Indian quintuple agent
- Bhagat Singh Thind, Indian-American writer and lecturer
- Bhagat Trilochan, saint

== Middle name ==
- Ram Bhagat Paswan, Indian politician

== Surname ==
- Akha Bhagat, poet
- Amarjeet Bhagat, Indian politician
- Ashok Bhagat, Indian social worker
- Asif Bashir Bhagat, Pakistani politician
- Baje Bhagat, Indian poet, writer, and artist
- Bali Bhagat, Indian politician
- Bali Ram Bhagat, Indian politician
- Banshidhar Bhagat, Indian politician
- Basawan Prasad Bhagat, Indian politician
- Bhoja Bhagat, poet and saint
- Bodh Singh Bhagat, Indian politician
- Budhu Bhagat, Indian rebel
- Chajju Bhagat, Hindu religious figure
- Chetan Bhagat, Indian author
- Chuni Lal Bhagat, Indian politician
- Datta Bhagat, Indian playwright and professor
- Devika Bhagat, Indian screenwriter
- Dhanraj Bhagat, Indian sculptor
- Dhiren Bhagat, Indian journalist
- Dimple Bhagat (born 1998), Indian football defender
- Dina Nath Bhagat, Indian politician
- Dukha Bhagat, Indian politician
- Gagan Bhagat, Indian politician
- Gharu Ram Bhagat, Indian politician
- Gopi Bhagat, Indian cinematographer
- H. K. L. Bhagat, Indian politician
- Indra Nath Bhagat, Indian politician
- Jatra Bhagat, Indian freedom fighter and reformist
- Jitu Bhagat, Indian politician
- Kamal Kishore Bhagat, Indian politician
- Kanha Bhagat, religious figure
- Karan Bhagat, Indian entrepreneur and investor
- Kush Bhagat, Indian chess player
- Madhu Bhagat, Indian politician
- Mohinder Bhagat, Indian politician
- Niranjan Bhagat, Indian poet, critic, and translator
- Pramod Bhagat, Indian para-badminton player
- Premindra Singh Bhagat, Indian general
- Puran Bhagat, legendary saint
- Rameshwar S. Bhagat, Indian film editor
- Raymuni Bhagat, Indian politician
- Sanjai Bhagat, professor of finance at the University of Colorado Boulder
- Sayali Bhagat, Indian actress and beauty pageant titleholder
- Shakuntala Bhagat, Indian civil engineer
- Shantilal Bhagat, Indian-American minister
- Sudarshan Bhagat, Indian politician
- Sukhdeo Bhagat, Indian politician
- Suman Lata Bhagat, Indian politician
- Usman Bhagat, member of the Kalat cricket team
- Vrinda Bhagat (born 1959), Indian cricketer
