= Bhagat =

Punjabi title and name

Bhagat is a term used in the Indian subcontinent to describe religious figures who have obtained high acclaim in their communities for their acts and devotion. The word bhagat is the Punjabi form of the Hindi word bhakt.

== Definition ==
Bhagat is a Hindi and Punjabi word derived from the Sanskrit word Bhagavat, भगवत्, which means saint or devotee. It is known to be used as an epithet for Vishnu or Krishna. Bhagat is also a Hindu, Buddhist, and Jain surname, found in various communities throughout India. Though, it is most prevalent in the northern states of India. A related term is bhakta, which bhagat is a variant form of.

== Sikhism ==
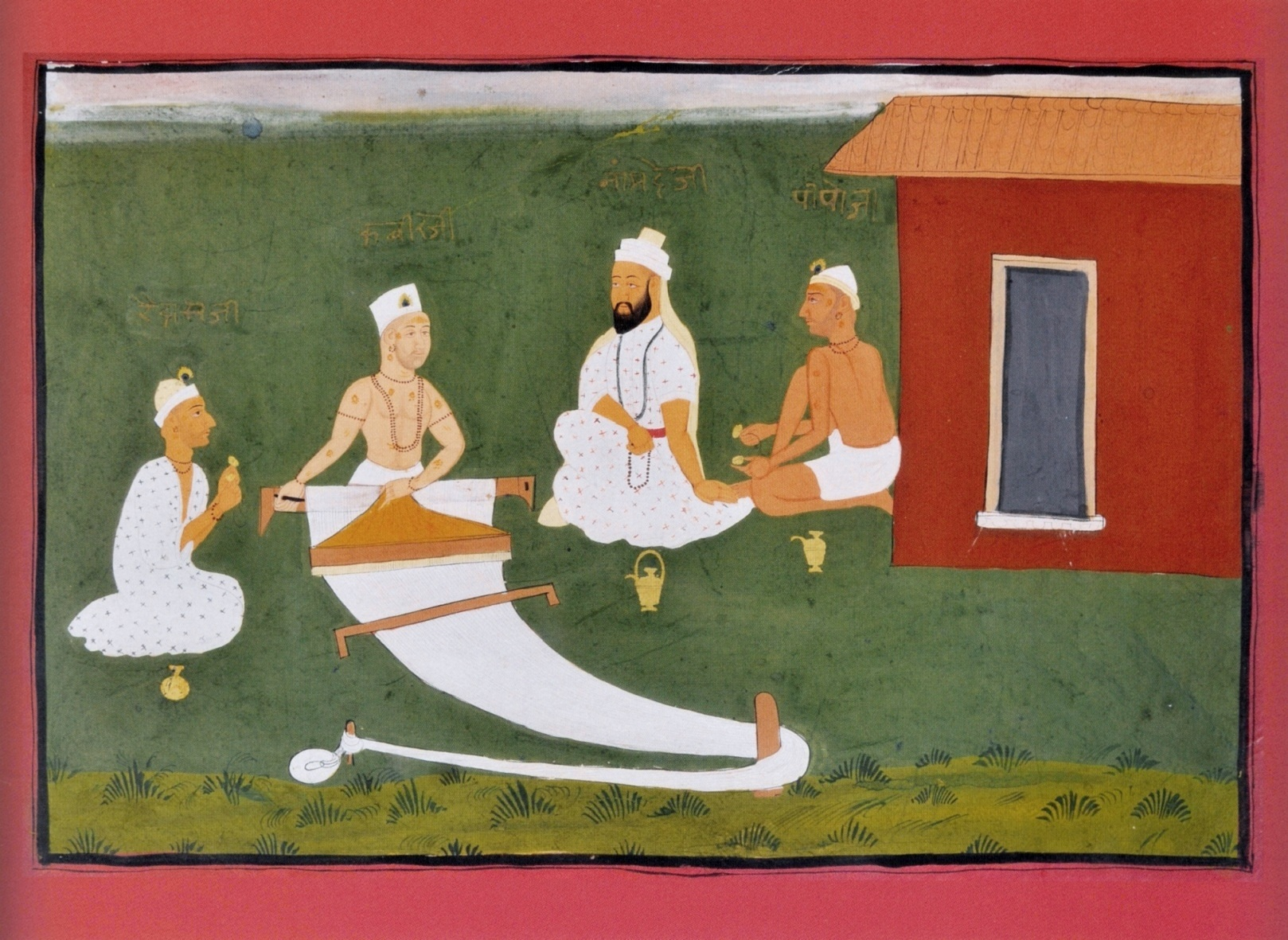
Four Bhagats of Sikhism: Bhagat Ravidas, Bhagat Kabir, Bhagat Namdev, and Bhagat Pipa.

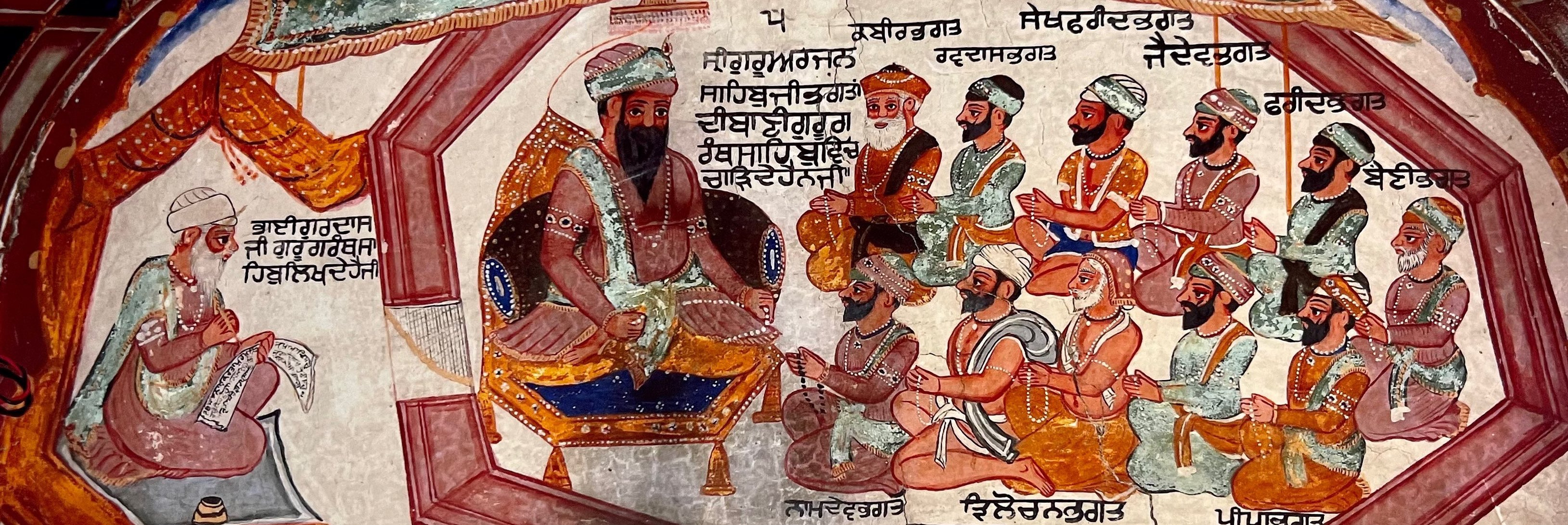
Fresco depicting Guru Arjan meeting the Bhagats and composing the Adi Granth (first rendition of the Guru Granth Sahib) with the assistance of Bhai Gurdas, circa mid-19th century. The fresco is located within Gurdwara Baba Bir Singh. Positioning of the Bhagats (on the right-side), starting clock-wise from beside Guru Arjan's right-side: Kabir, Ravidas, Sheikh Farid, Jaidev, Farid?, Beni, Pipa, unknown, Trilochan, Dhanna?, and Namdev. Bhai Gurdas is on the left-side, scribing a manuscript.

Sikhism's central scriptural book, Guru Granth Sahib, has teachings of 15 Bhagats, along with bani of Sikh Gurus, Bhats and Gursikhs. Because Sikhism believes in one human creed (no one belongs to a higher or a lower social status or caste) and that accounts to adding Bani of various authors, a total of 36, in Guru Granth Sahib irrespective of many belonging to religions other than Sikhism. Religious writings of those Bhagats were collected by Guru Arjan. Some of them lived before Guru Nanak, but came to have a monotheistic as opposed to a polytheistic doctrine.

Broadly speaking, therefore, a Bhagat is a holy person or a member of a community whose objectives involve leading humanity towards God and highlighting injustices in the world.

Below is a list of the Bhagats who contributed towards Sri Guru Granth Sahib:

- Bhagat Kabir
- Bhagat Ravidas
- Bhagat Farid
- Bhagat Ramanand
- Bhagat Beni
- Bhagat Namdev
- Bhagat Sadhana
- Bhagat Bhikhan
- Bhagat Parmanand
- Bhagat Sain
- Bhagat Dhanna
- Bhagat Pipa
- Bhagat Surdas
- Bhagat Jaidev
- Bhagat Trilochan

The Sikkhān dī Bhagat-māl attributed to Bhai Mani Singh covers prominent Sikhs of the gurus.

== Other bhagats ==
Not all of the bhagats had their works included in the Guru Granth Sahib. The bhagats who belong to this category include Pilu, Chajju Bhagat, and Kahna Bhagat. Some other bhagat writers were Hirdey Ram and Vali Ram. Nabha Das authored the Bhaktamal which covered various bhaktas.

== Other uses ==
It is also a term ascribed to one of the clans in the Mahar caste, with their clan totem being a King Cobra. Furthermore, Bhagat is additionally a surname found among Marathas, Bania communities and Punjabi Brahmins.

== See also ==
- Sant (religion)
