= Sham Lal Choudhary =

Indian politician

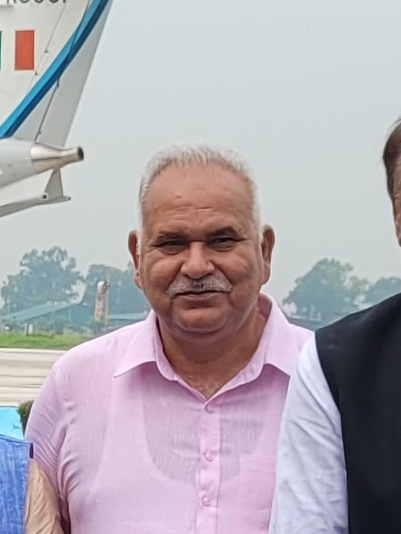
- Sham Lal Choudhary

Member of Jammu and Kashmir Legislative Assembly
- In office 23 December 2014 – 2018
- Governor: Narinder Nath Vohra
- Chief Minister: Mehbooba Mufti
- Preceded by: Gharu Ram choudhary
- Succeeded by: Gharu Ram Bhagat
- Constituency: Suchetgarh

Personal details
- Party: Bharatiya Janata Party
- Occupation: Politician

Sham Lal Choudhary is an Indian politician and member of the Bharatiya Janata Party. He was a cabinet minister in the BJP-PDP Coalition Government in the state of Jammu and Kashmir and is now the current bjp vice president.

Choudhary rapidly rose in politics. Hailing from the Dev Batala village of Bhimber Tehsil in what is now the Pakistani administered territory of Azad Kashmir, he migrated to the border village of Chakroi in Ranbir Singh Pura. He represented the border constituency of Suchetgarh in the Jammu district, in the Jammu and Kashmir Legislative Assembly.

== Education ==
Choudhary started his primary education in the Chakroi government school and matriculated in 1977 before attending Government Higher Secondary School, R S Pura to complete his 10+2. An outstanding student, Choudhary entered the SPMR College of Commerce in 1981 despite hardships.

== Social life ==
Choudhary has spearheaded various efforts to help the poor. He was responsible for changing the Chakroi Development Committee into the Border Development Committee, giving the people a voice in the area's development.

== Political career ==
In 1996, Choudhary joined the Bhartiya Janta Party (BJP) to represent the border population, and in 2000 won his debut Panchayat elections unopposed.

BJP chose him as their party candidate from Suchetgarh for the 2008 assembly elections, which he won by a large margin.

In his first tenure as MLA, the border district experienced its greatest recorded development. Choudhary was re-elected in 2014, and was eventually inducted into the cabinet.

Choudhary lost the DDC Elections from Suchetgarh, this was the only seat in Jammu which BJP lost.

later on in 2021 Choudhary was elected as the bjp vice president .

== Electoral performance ==
Election	Constituency	Party	Result	Votes %	Opposition Candidate	Opposition Party	Opposition vote %	Ref
2014	Suchetgarh	BJP	Won	38.82%	Taranjit Singh Toni	JKNC	20.51%	
2008	Suchetgarh	BJP	Won	39.39%	Taranjeet Singh	JKNC	22.77%	
2002	Suchetgarh	Independent	Lost	8.99%	Gharu Ram choudhary	INC	27.45%	
