= Chajju Da Chaubara =

Historic building in Lahore, Pakistan

- چھجُو دا چَوبارا
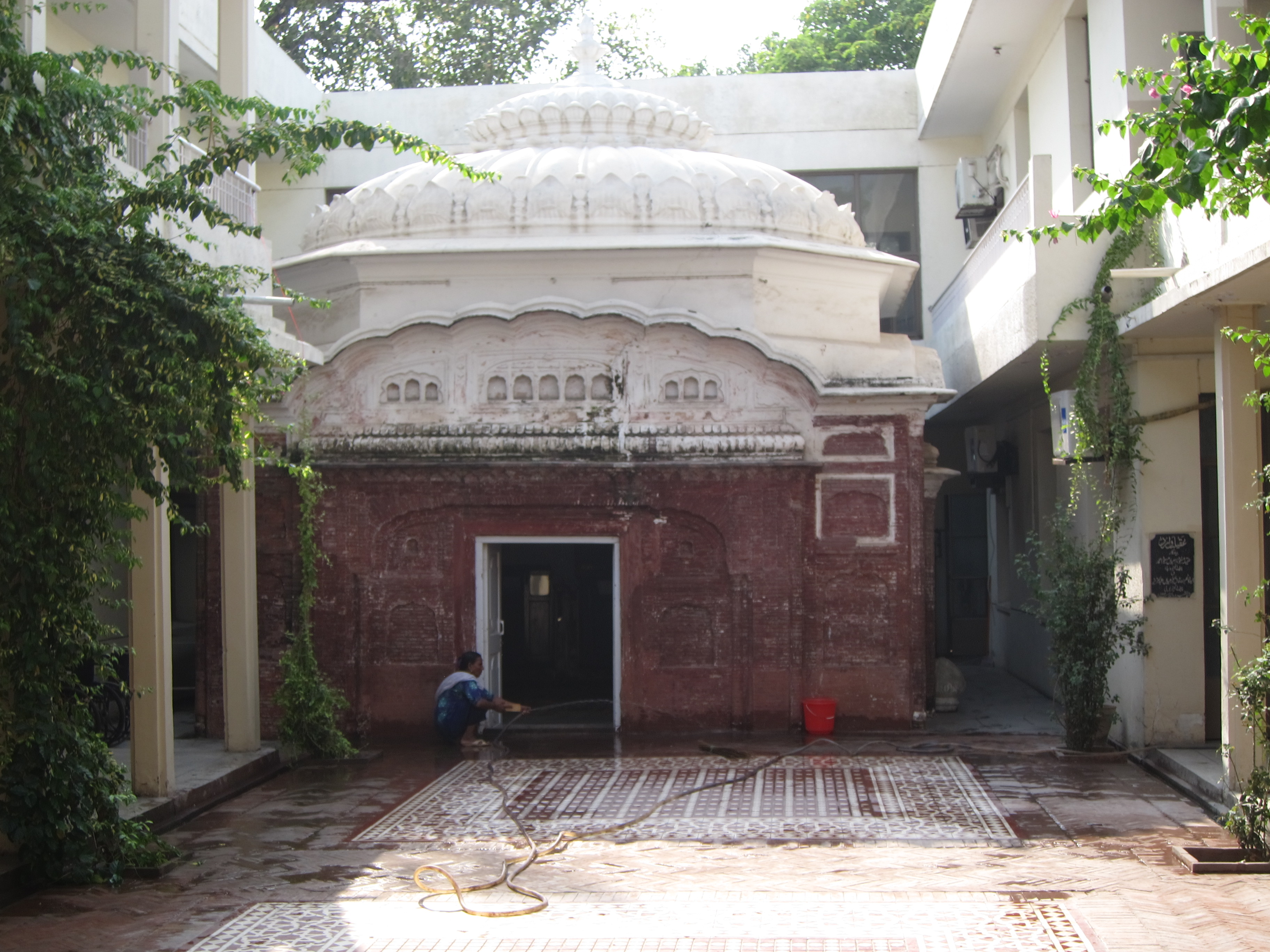
- Interactive map of Chajju Da Chaubara
- Location: Lahore, Punjab, Pakistan
- Coordinates: 31°34′17″N 74°18′57″E
- Completion date: c. 1641 C.E.

Chajju Da Chaubara (Punjabi: چھجُو دا چَوبارا; lit. 'Chajju's elevated room or dwelling') is a 17th-century shrine located in Lahore, Punjab, Pakistan. It is an iconic and historical landmark, famous for being the residence and place of worship of Chajju Bhagat, a revered Hindu saint and philanthropist during the Mughal era. It serves as the samadh of Chajju Bhagat.

== Location ==
It is situated in the Anarkali area, specifically within the Mayo Hospital complex near the Lohari Gate in Lahore in Punjab, Pakistan.

== Architecture ==
The structure is a small, dome-shaped building known as a chaubara (a room on the upper floor or a single-room attic). Part of the original structure has been integrated into the Shams Shahabuddin Convalescent Home and the Mayo Hospital grounds.

== History ==
A monument dedicated to him, known as Chajju da Chaubara was built in Tila Bukhari Mohallah near Shah Alami, now located within the middle of Shams Shahabuddin Convalescent Home next to Mayo Hospital in Lahore, believed to be the place Chajju resided and meditated. This chaubara, over time was to become the famed "Chajju da Chaubara". After his death, a marble samadh was constructed, being managed by the Dadupanthis. The monument was originally raised during Bhangi rule. Bawa Pritam Das of Pakpattan constructed a mandir there, when he was working as mahant in Lahore. The site was associated with sadhs. This area became a center of attention in the reign of Ranjit Singh who was a regular visitor here. The architecture of the edifice contains both Mughal and Sikh influences. The chaubara complex once consisted of a number of auxiliary structure although now only the chaubara remains.

== Associated Punjabi proverb ==
"Jo sukh Chajju de chaubarey, oh na Balkh na Bukharay" (Punjabi: جو سُکھ چھجُو دے چَوبارے اوہ نہ بلخ نہ بخارے) is a famous Punjabi proverb, it means "the comfort and satisfaction found in Chajju’s room (chaubara) is not to be found in the cities of Balkh or Bukhara". This phrase signifies that true peace, contentment, or home-like comfort is rare and superior to all worldly luxury. It is a Punjabi version of "East or West, Home is the Best" or a way of saying that simple spiritual peace is better than expensive, far-off luxury.

== Gallery ==
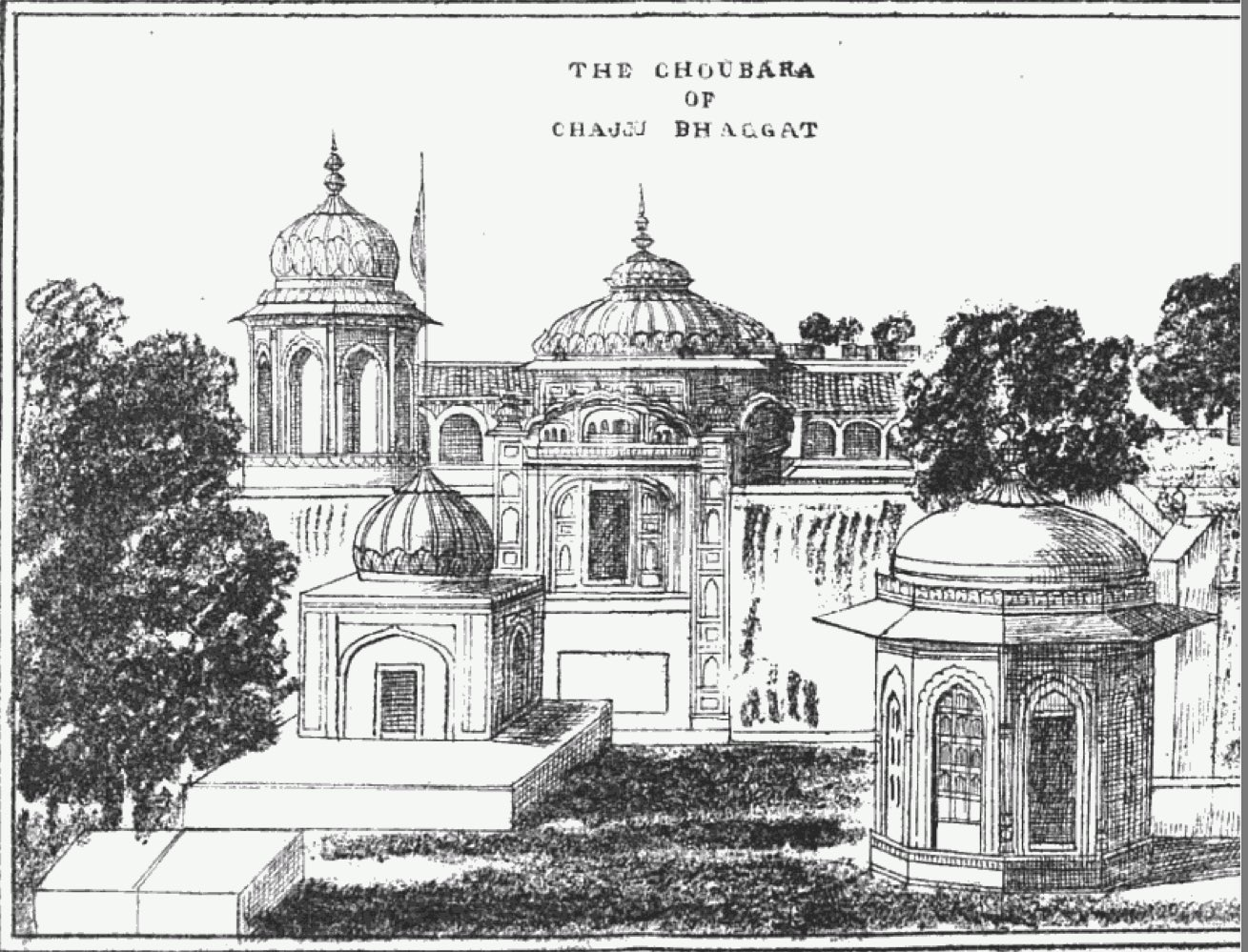

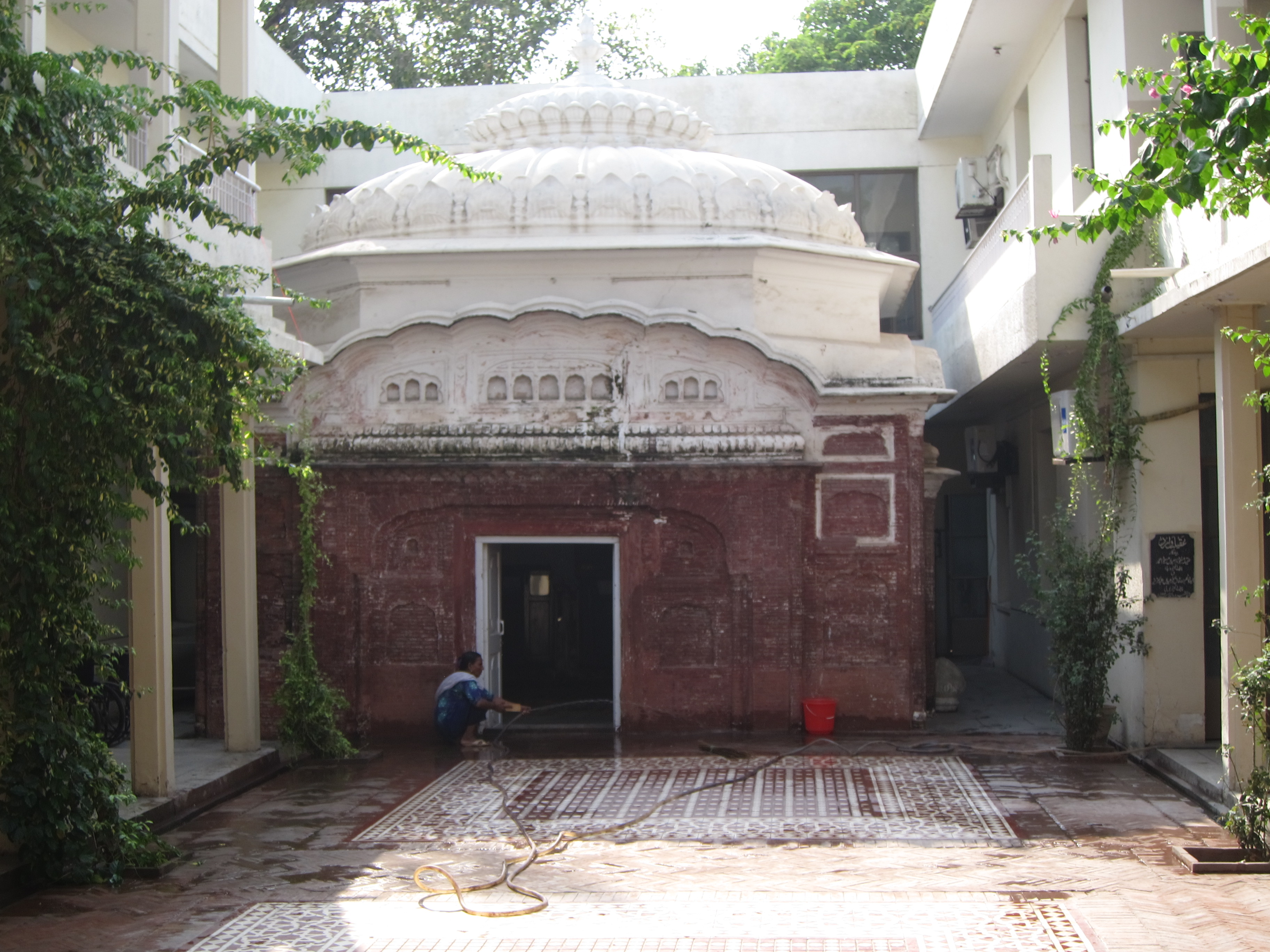

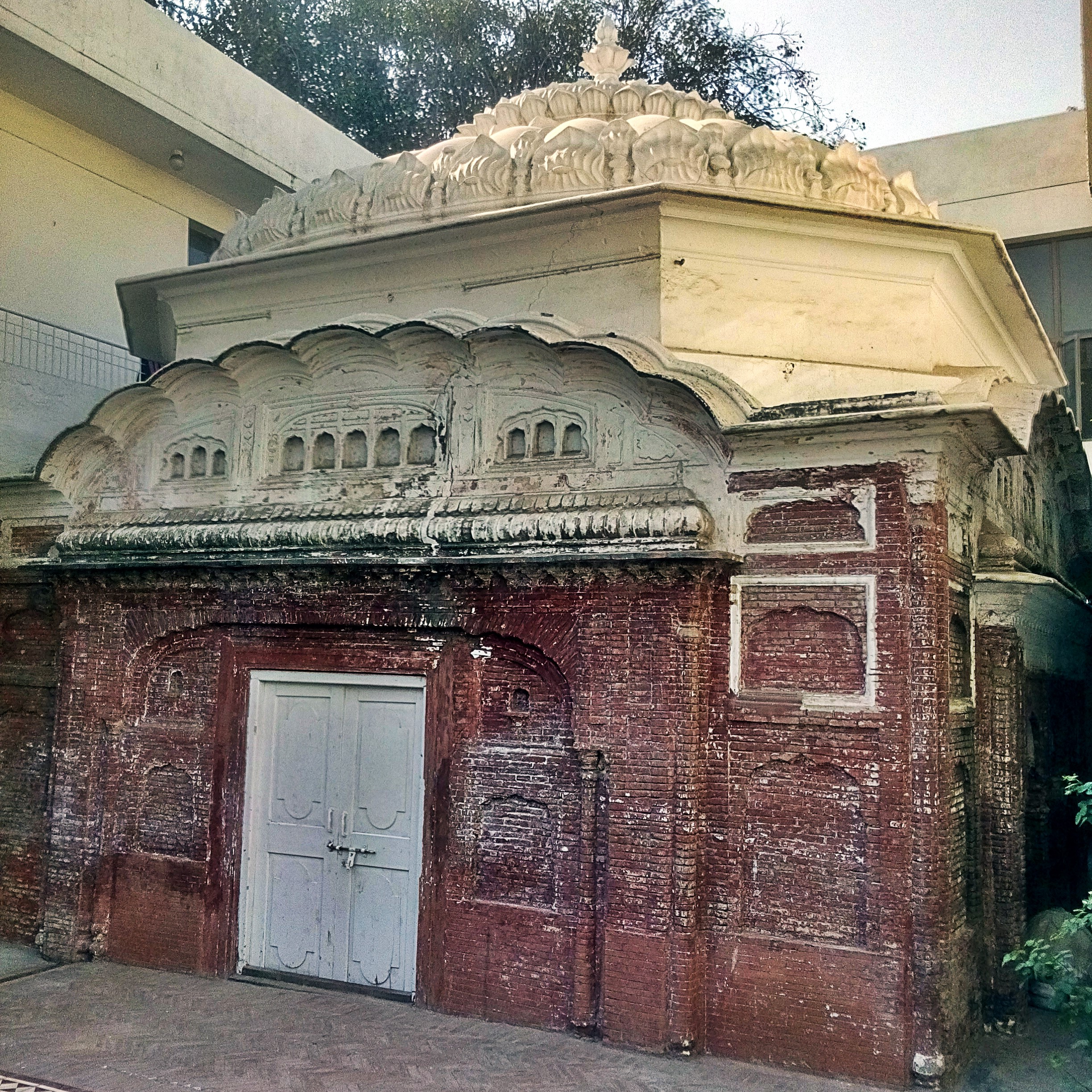

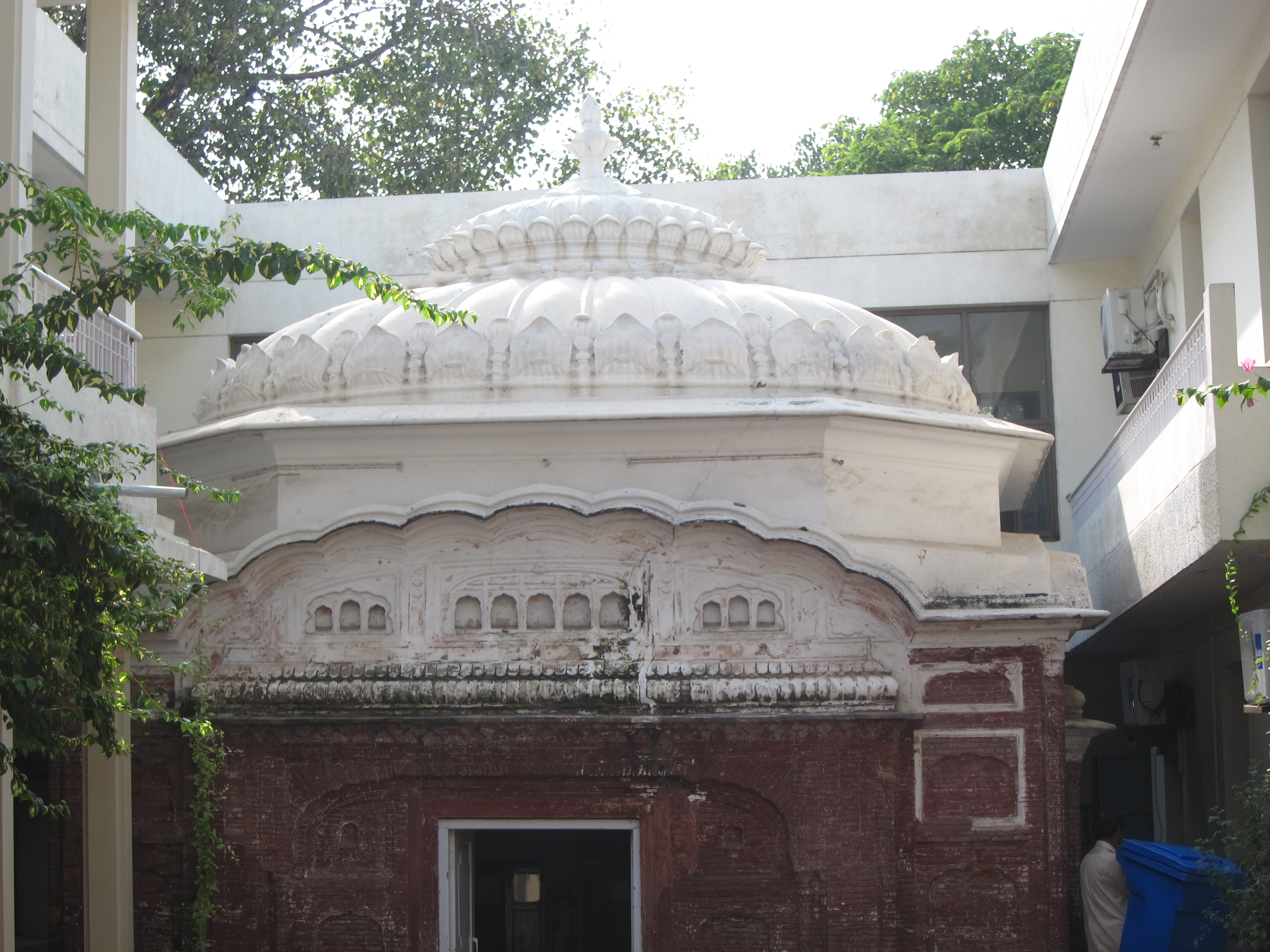
