= Shantilal =

Shantilal may refer to

- Shantilal C. Sheth, Indian pediatrician
- Shantilal Mukherjee, Indian actor
- Shantilal Soni, Film director
- Shantilal O Projapoti Rohoshyo, Bengali film
- Shantilal Patel, Indian politician
- Shantilal Shah Engineering College, located in Bhavnagar
- Mohit Shantilal Shah, Former Chief Justice of the Bombay High Court
- Shantilal Kothari, Indian politician
- Shantilal Jamnadas Mehta, Indian surgeon
- Shantilal Bhagat, Director of Eco-Justice Concerns for the Church of the Brethren
- Shantilal Shah, Indian politician
