= Sadna Qasai Mosque =

Former mosque in Sirhind, Punjab, India

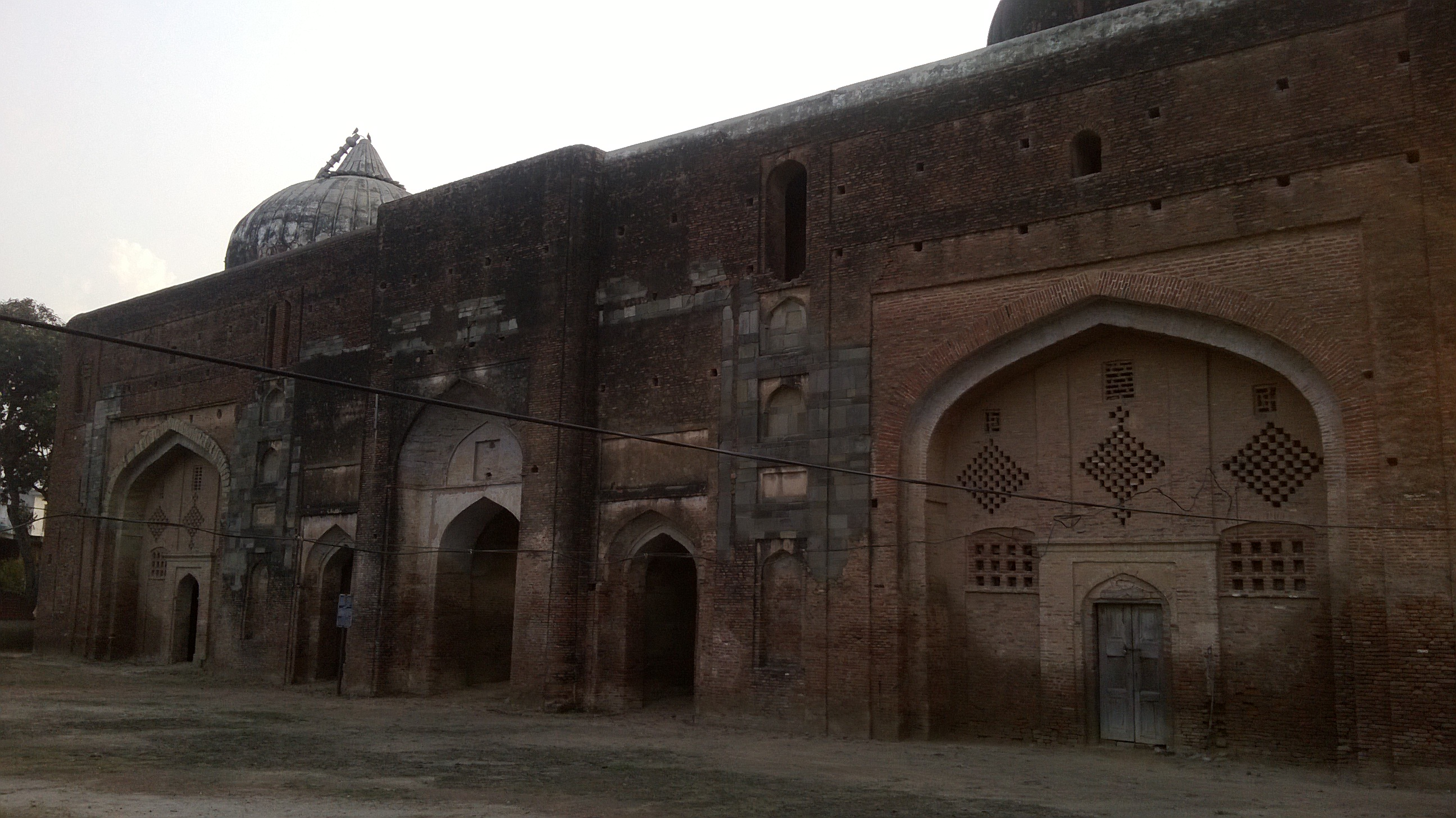
- The former mosque, in 2013

- Location of the former mosque in Punjab

Religion
- Affiliation: Islam (former)
- Ecclesiastical or organizational status: Mosque (former)
- Status: Abandoned (partial ruins)

Location
- Location: Sirhind, Punjab
- Country: India
- Interactive map of Sadna Qasai Mosque
- Coordinates: 30°38′48″N 76°23′02″E

Architecture
- Type: Mosque architecture
- Founder: Humayun (likely)
- Completed: c. 16th century
- Domes: Five (one since collapsed)

The Sadna Qasai Mosque is a former mosque in a ruinous state, located in Sirhind, in the state of Punjab, India. It is listed as a state protected monument.

== History ==
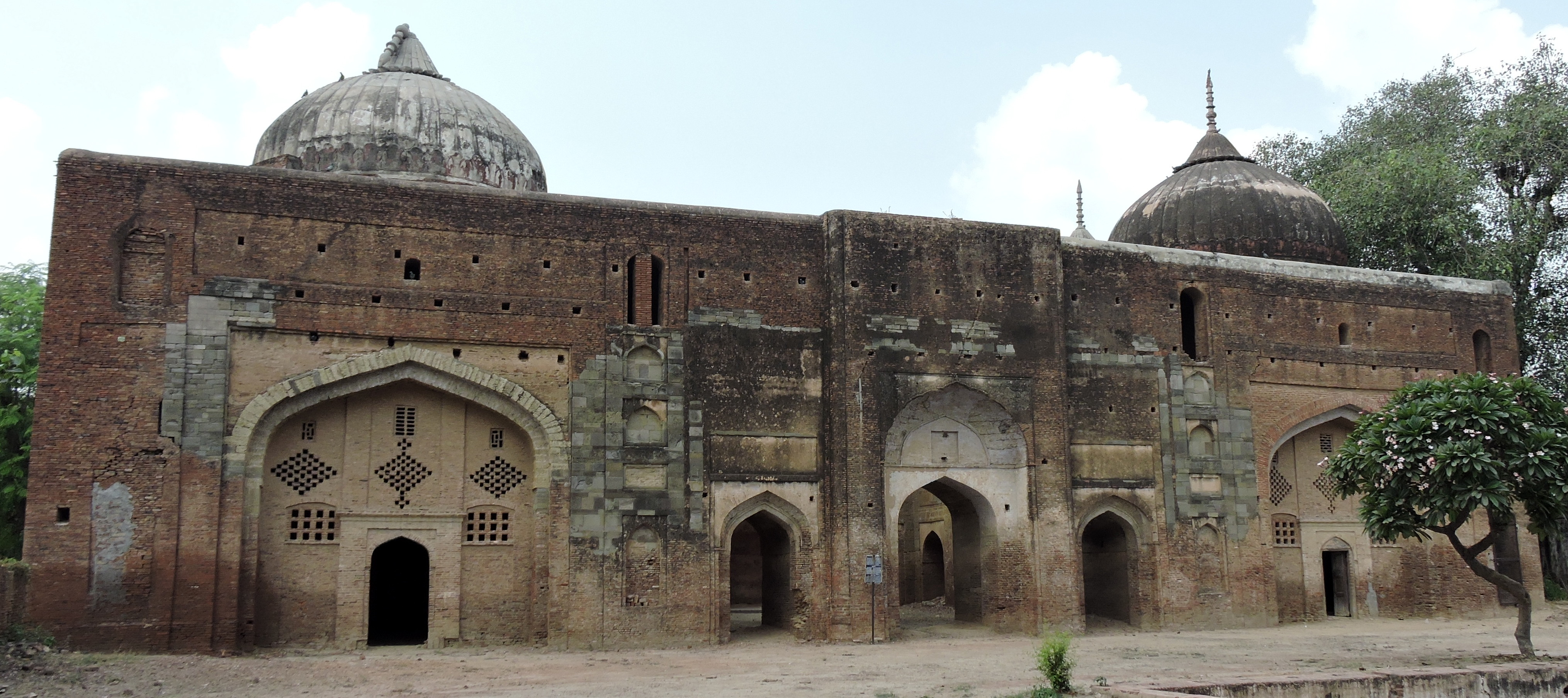
The former mosque, in 2016

The exact date of the mosque's construction is not known. Scholars estimate that it was possibly built towards the end of the reign of the Delhi Sultanate, or the beginning of the Mughal period. It is possible that Humayun constructed this mosque to commemorate his victory at the Battle of Sirhind in 1555. The mosque is named after Bhagat Sadhana.

As of 2025, the mosque is in a ruinous condition. A public-interest litigation was filed in the Punjab and Haryana High Court to preserve the mosque.

== Description ==
The mosque is divided into three wings, a central wing measuring 11.8 by 11.7 metres (39 by 38 ft), flanked on either side by a side wing measuring 14.1 by 6 metres (46 by 20 ft). The façade contains five arched entrances, with the three central arches leading to the central wing, and each of the remaining two arches leading to one of the side wings. A parapet runs along the top of the façade, and the height of the façade up to the parapet is 9.8 metres (32 ft).

The building originally had five domes, with a large dome surmounting the central wing, and two small domes crowning each of the side wings. The large dome has since collapsed. A square ablution tank stands in front of the mosque.

=== Interior ===
The western wall of the central wing contains three mihrabs (prayer-niches). The central niche contains painted floral designs, which are considered to be a later addition. A painted inscription was also present over the niche, but it has now faded away. The central wing is connected to each of the side wings by means of two narrow arches.

The side wings contain no prayer-niches, and this might indicate that only the central wing might have served as a prayer-hall. Each of the side wings is divided into two sections, each measuring 6 by 5.7 metres (20 by 19 ft). Each section has a domical ceiling, rising above pendetives at the corners.

== See also ==
- Islam in India
- List of mosques in India

== Bibliography ==
- Parihar, Subhash (2004). "Historical Mosques of Sirhind". Islamic Studies. 43 (3): 481–510. doi:10.52541/isiri.v43i3.4780. ISSN 0578-8072. JSTOR 20837363.
- Parihar, Subhash (2006). History and Architectural Remains of Sirhind: The Greatest Mughal City on Delhi-Lahore Highway. Aryan Books International. p. 157. ISBN 978-81-7305-311-5.
