= Santokh Das =

Religious figure

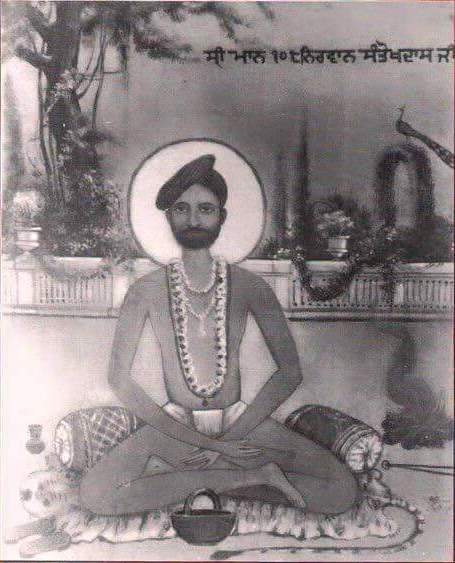
Painting of Santokh Das depicted haloed upon a pelt as an ascetic

Santokh Das (died 1793) was an Udasi saint and mahant active in the 18th century. He is remembered for his construction projects in the city of Amritsar and the founding of Udasi organizations. Popular lore connects him to the birth of Maharaja Ranjit Singh.

== Biography ==
Santokh Das was an ascetic and miracle-worker, being a disciple of the Udasi figure Bhai Pheru (also known as Sangat Sahib), who operated a nomadic akhara. Santokh Das belonged to the Sangat Sahib Ke sub-sect of the Udasis. Santokh Das in 1753 founded the Brahm Buta Akhara near the Sri Darbar Sahib in Amritsar, one of the akharas of the city. Santokh Das received from Raja Singh three villages worth 1,600 rupees per year in the region of Mananwala. His akhara had a Shivala (Shavist temple) attached to it that provided education on Sanskrit grammar and poetry. Santokh Das would conduct educational gatherings, known as a chela, that they called Bankhandi Jamat.

In 1762, he fought against the forces of Ahmad Shah Abdali. Between 1781–1784, he constructed, alongside another Udasi named Pritam Das, a hansli (canal) connecting the Shahi Nahar irrigation-channel to the sarovars of Amritsar to continuously provide them with a water-source. In 1783, Santokh Das and Pritam Das brought a piece of a tall sāl tree from Dera Ram Rai (present-day Dehradun) which they used as material to construct a flagpole that they installed a Nishan Sahib on, with the flagpole being erected in-front of a pre-existing bunga near the Akal Takht, with the bunga then acquiring the name Jhanda Bunga as a result. Many Nirmala saints, when bestowed land-grants by Sikh rulers patronizing them, passed on their gifts to the akhara of Santokh Das. The Brahm Buta Akhara claims that Maharaja Ranjit Singh was born based on a blessing given by Santokh Das.

Santokh Das died in 1793 and his successor was Apbrahm. In the early 19th century during the reign of Ranjit Singh, the Brahm Buta Akhara was one of the most awarded akharas of the Punjab in way of revenue-grants, receiving 18,000 rupees per year. In the 1840s, the akhara had 20 sadhs knowledgeable in Sikh scriptures and 70 musicians.

== List of successors ==
The list of leaders of the dera of Santokh Das, associated with his akhara:

- Santokh Das (1753–1793)
- Apbrahm (1793–1835)
- Brahmhari (1835–1852)
- Brahmbuta (1852–1885)
- Niranjan Das (1885–1915)
- Paragdas (1915–1935)
- Jai Ram Das (1935–1942)
- Sadhu Ram (1942 – 15 September 1942)
- Lakshman Das (30 October 1942 – 23 December 1952)
- Rahan Das (8 January 1953—4 October 1958)
- Bikram Das (7 December 1958 —16 February 1981)
- Ravinder Das (16 February 1981— present)
