= Jhanda Bunga =

Former Sikh structure in Amritsar, India

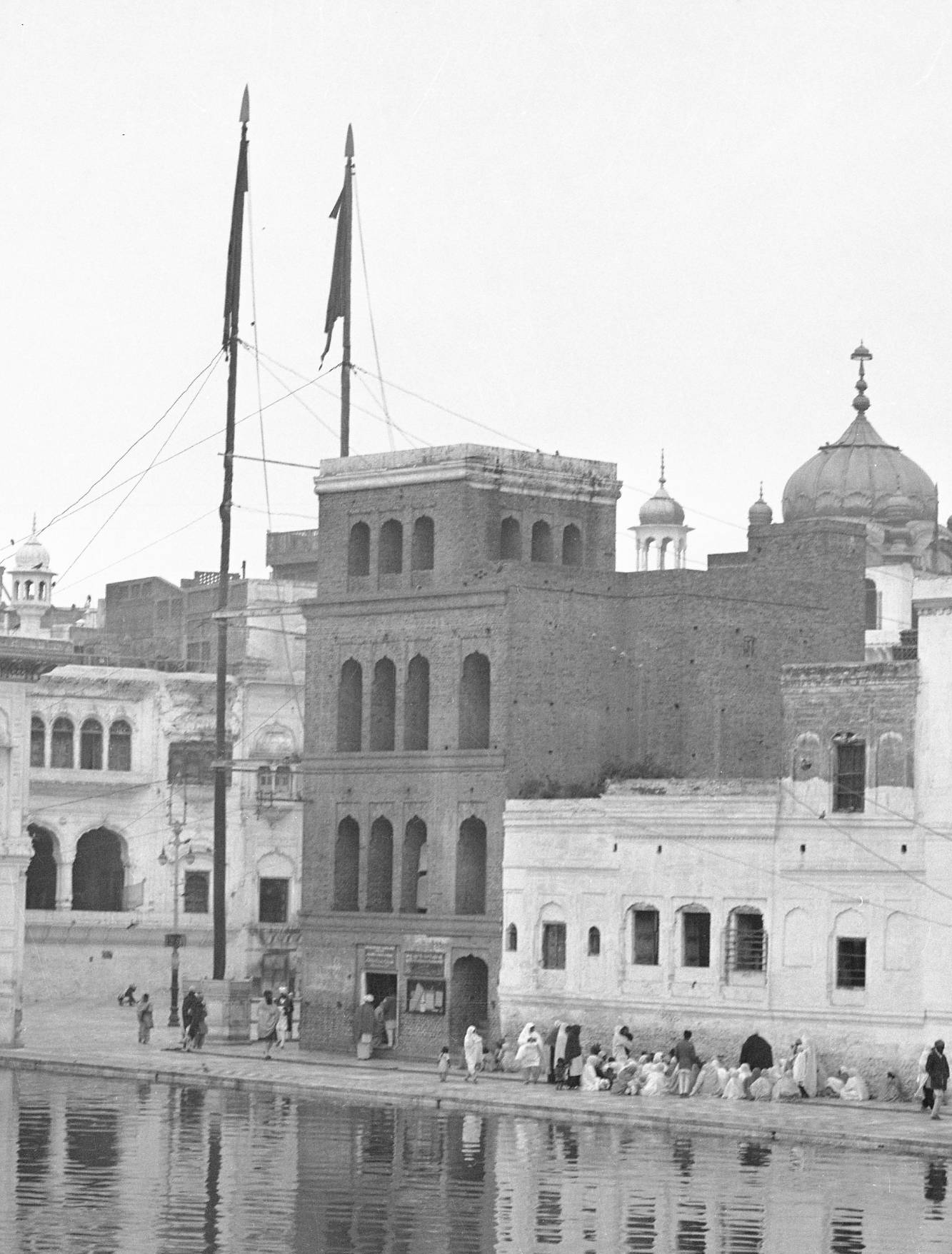
The Jhanda Bunga of Amritsar, now demolished. Detail of a photograph by Frederick Gardner Clapp, 16 January 1938

Jhanda Bunga was a Sikh structure located within the Golden Temple complex in Amritsar, Punjab, India. It was originally erected by the Udasi sect and was notable for being the location of the twin Nishan Sahibs located in the square of the Akal Takht. It was demolished in the 20th century by the gurdwara management and replaced with newer constructions.

== Etymology ==
The structure was named after the word jhanda, referring to a tall, Sikh, standard flag. The word bunga refers to a structure used as a hospice or rest-house.

== History ==
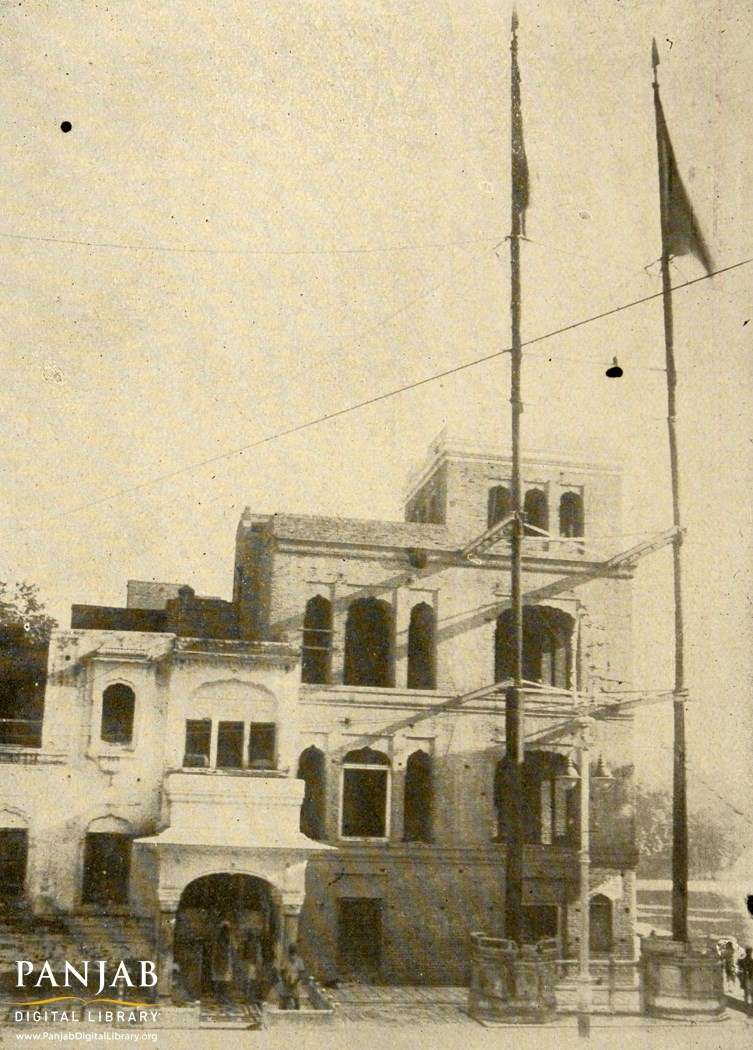
Jhanda Bunga, Golden Temple complex, Amritsar, circa late 1920's. Digitized by Panjab Digital Library.

As per the Bansavalinama, the Jhanda Bunga was associated with the Bandais (followers of Banda Singh Bahadur) whilst the Akal Purkhias were associated with the Akal Bunga. The Jhanda Bunga and its flag was erected in 1775 by the Udasis of Brahm Buta Akhara. The Udasis of Brahm Buta Akhara also were responsible for digging a hansli (water channel) to feed water into the Amrit Sarovar of the Darbar Sahib complex in 1783. As per another source, in 1783 the Udasi mahants Pritam Das and Santokh Das brought a piece of a tall sāl tree from Dera Ram Rai (present-day Dehradun) which they used as material to construct a flagpole that they installed a Nishan Sahib on, with the flagpole being erected in-front of a pre-existing bunga near the Akal Takht, with the bunga then acquiring the name Jhanda Bunga as a result.

In 1820, Desa Singh Majithia replaced the wooden flagpole with a steel one that was decorated with gilded copper plates. In 1841, the flag that had been erected by the Udasis collapsed due to heavy rains, thus two jhanda flags were erected in its place, the taller flag by Maharaja Sher Singh and the smaller one by Lehna Singh Majithia, who was the custodian of Amritsar. Other sources state the flags were of equal size.

In 1923, the two flags were shifted a few metres due to renovations needed to widen the parikrama of the complex. In 1962, the two flagpoles were replaced by the SGPC with newer steel piles that were also gilded with copper sheets so that the pole could be electrified to light-up the flagpole. Nearly all of the bungas of the Golden Temple complex, including the Jhanda Bunga, were demolished by the SGPC in the 20th century in their renovations of the site.
