= Suchetgarh Assembly constituency =

Constituency of the Jammu and Kashmir legislative assembly in India

Coordinates: 32.57°N 74.67°E

Suchetgarh
- Constituency No. 73 for the Jammu and Kashmir Legislative Assembly

Constituency details
- Country: India
- Region: North India
- Union Territory: Jammu and Kashmir
- District: Jammu
- Lok Sabha constituency: Jammu
- Established: 1996
- Reservation: SC

Member of Legislative Assembly
- Incumbent Gharu Ram Bhagat
- Party: BJP
- Alliance: NDA
- Elected year: 2024

Suchetgarh Assembly constituency is one of the 90 constituencies in the Jammu and Kashmir Legislative Assembly of Jammu and Kashmir a north state of India. It is also part of Jammu Lok Sabha constituency.

== Members of the Legislative Assembly ==
Election	Member	Party
1996	Chuni Lal	Bharatiya Janata Party
2002	Gharu Ram Choudhary	Indian National Congress
2008	Sham Lal Choudhary	Bharatiya Janata Party
2014	Sham Lal Choudhary	Bharatiya Janata Party
2024	Gharu Ram Bhagat	Bharatiya Janata Party

== Election results ==
=== Assembly Election 2024 ===
2024 Jammu and Kashmir Legislative Assembly election : Suchetgarh
Party	Candidate	Votes	%	±%
BJP	Gharu Ram Bhagat	39,302	46.32%	▲7.51
INC	Bhusan Lal	28,161	33.19%	▲14.37
DPAP	Ajaib Singh	8,265	9.74%	New
Independent	Usha Devi	4,210	4.96%	New
Independent	Sham Lal Bhagat	1,277	1.51%	New
BSP	Bishan Dass	1,094	1.29%	▲0.28
Independent	Dr Preeti Kumari	644	0.76%	New
NOTA	None of the Above	409	0.48%	▲0.06
Margin of victory		11,141	13.13%	▼5.17
Turnout		84,847	75.21%	▼3.11
Registered electors		1,12,819		▲71.73
BJP hold		Swing	▲7.51	

=== Assembly Election 2014 ===
2014 Jammu and Kashmir Legislative Assembly election : Suchetgarh
Party	Candidate	Votes	%	±%
BJP	Sham Lal Choudhary	19,971	38.82%	▼0.58
JKNC	Taranjeet Singh	10,554	20.51%	▼2.26
INC	Rajinder Singh Chib	9,684	18.82%	▲4.49
JKPDP	Tarlok Singh Bajwa	8,578	16.67%	▲2.76
Independent	Bhupinder Singh	628	1.22%	New
BSP	Harjeet Kumar	520	1.01%	▼1.52
Independent	Rajinder Singh Toofani	353	0.69%	New
NOTA	None of the Above	217	0.42%	New
Margin of victory		9,417	18.30%	▲1.68
Turnout		51,451	78.32%	▼1.48
Registered electors		65,695		▲14.76
BJP hold		Swing	▼0.58	

=== Assembly Election 2008 ===
2008 Jammu and Kashmir Legislative Assembly election : Suchetgarh
Party	Candidate	Votes	%	±%
BJP	Sham Lal Choudhary	17,995	39.39%	▲12.28
JKNC	Taranjeet Singh	10,403	22.77%	▲9.41
INC	Garu Ram Choudhary	6,545	14.33%	▼13.12
JKPDP	Tarlok Singh Bajwa	6,357	13.92%	▲1.51
BSP	Mohan Singh	1,154	2.53%	▼1.77
JKNPP	Ashok Kumar	504	1.10%	▲0.36
Kranti Dal	Kundan Lal Sharma	373	0.82%	New
SP	Makhan Singh	318	0.70%	New
Independent	Girdhari Lal	306	0.67%	New
BBP	Hari Singh	294	0.64%	New
Margin of victory		7,592	16.62%	▲16.29
Turnout		45,682	79.80%	▲10.03
Registered electors		57,246		▼3.36
BJP gain from INC		Swing	▲11.95	

=== Assembly Election 2002 ===
2002 Jammu and Kashmir Legislative Assembly election : Suchetgarh
Party	Candidate	Votes	%	±%
INC	Gharu Ram Choudhary	11,344	27.45%	▲1.61
BJP	Rajinder Singh Chib	11,207	27.11%	▲0.83
JKNC	Taranjeet Singh	5,524	13.36%	▲10.98
JKPDP	Trilok Singh	5,127	12.40%	New
Independent	Sham Lal Choudhary	3,715	8.99%	New
BSP	Mohan Singh	1,776	4.30%	▼12.18
SS	Kasturi Singh	600	1.45%	New
NCP	Tilak Raj	474	1.15%	New
CPI	Dalip Singh	318	0.77%	New
JKNPP	Rajinder Singh	306	0.74%	▼18.87
Independent	Vijay Chib	298	0.72%	New
Margin of victory		137	0.33%	▼0.12
Turnout		41,332	69.81%	▼0.74
Registered electors		59,238		▲38.53
INC gain from BJP		Swing	▲1.16	

=== Assembly Election 1996 ===
1996 Jammu and Kashmir Legislative Assembly election : Suchetgarh
Party	Candidate	Votes	%	±%
BJP	Chuni Lal	7,925	26.28%	New
INC	Gharu Ram Choudhary	7,789	25.83%	New
JKNPP	Rajinder Singh Chib	5,912	19.61%	New
BSP	Makhan Singh	4,968	16.48%	New
JD	Souchet Singh	1,834	6.08%	New
AIIC(T)	Rajesh Kumar Sharma	815	2.70%	New
JKNC	Nanak Singh	719	2.38%	New
JKAL	Kharak Singh	189	0.63%	New
Margin of victory		136	0.45%	
Turnout		30,151	71.59%	
Registered electors		42,762		
BJP win (new seat)				

== See also ==
- Jammu
- List of constituencies of Jammu and Kashmir Legislative Assembly
