= Hafiz Barkhurdar =

Punjabi Sufi poet (1658–1707)

- Born: 1658; Takht Hazara, Sargodha, Punjab (now Punjab, Pakistan)
- Died: 1707 (aged 48–49)
- Resting place: Chitti Shaikhan, Sialkot, Punjab, Pakistan
- Writing career
- Notable works: Mirza Sahiban, Sassi Punnu and Yousaf Zulaikha

Hafiz Barkhurdar (Punjabi: حافظ برخوردار; 1658–1707) was a renowned Punjabi Sufi poet and a prominent figure in classical Punjabi literature. He was the disciple of Pilu.

== Early life ==
Hafiz Barkhurdar was born in 1658 into a Punjabi Muslim family in the Sargodha District of modern-day Punjab, Pakistan.

== Poetic works ==
After Pilu, the poet, he was the second one to write the folktale of Mirza Sahiban as he was asked by the Pilu in a dramatic way to write the folktale again as mentioned in the book itself. Moreover, he also wrote three other tales including Sassi Punnu, Yousaf Zulaikha and Qissa khatri.

One of his very famous piece of Punjabi poetry is as under:

حُجرے شاہ مقیم دے اک جٹی عرض کرے

میں بکرا دیواں پیر دا جے سر دا سائیں مرے

ہٹی سڑے کراڑ دی جِتھے دیوا نت بلے

کُتی مرے فقیر دی، جیہڑی چوں چوں نت کرے

پنج ست مرن گوانڈھناں، رہندیاں نُوں تاپ چڑھے

گلیاں ہو جان سُنجیاں، وچ مرزا یار پھرے

Explanation of the poem:

(Oh my Lord you live in my heart. My soul prays to you that my ego must be killed. So that I can become the one whom you like. The lamp of my wishes may extinguish for ever and my arrogance may turn in to humbleness and I may get riddance from deceit, lies, jealousy and dishonesty which are always part of me. So that the alleys of my thinking may become pure where I could invite you my Lord.)

== Tomb ==
He died in 1707 and his tomb is situated in Chitti Shaikhan, Sialkot District in Punjab, Pakistan.

== See also ==
- Punjabi folklore
- Punjabi Qisse
