= Chajju Bhagat =

Punjabi religious figure

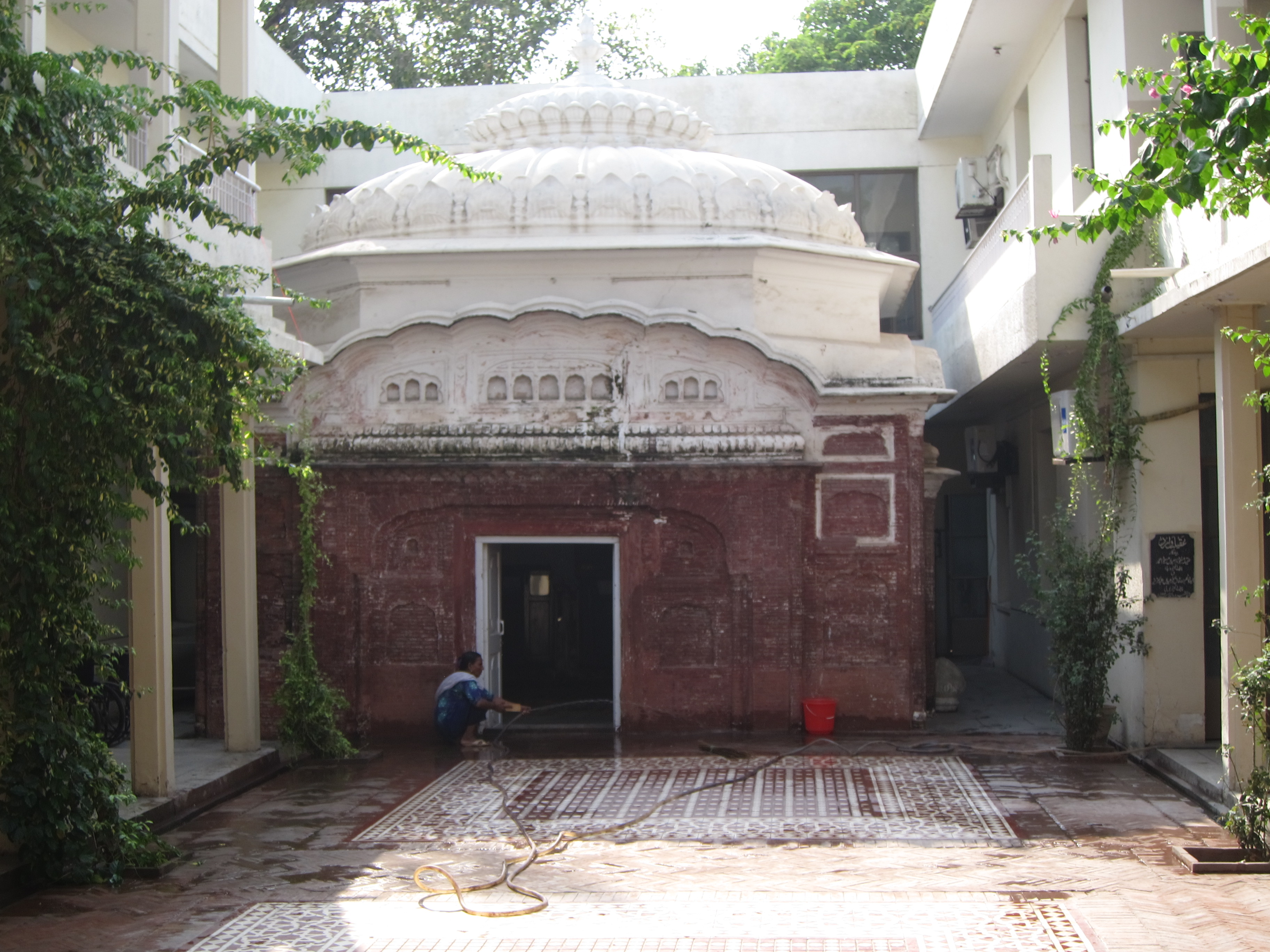
Chaubara of Chajju Bhagat (Chajju da Chaubara) in Lahore, 2014

Chajju Bhagat (died 1640) was a Punjabi Hindu religious figure during the 17th century who left his business to become a spiritual renunciate. A monument dedicated to him can be found in Lahore. He was celebrated as a bhagat.

== Biography ==
He was originally known as Lala Chajju Ram. According to Syad Muhammad Latif, Bhajju was of Bhatia origin and worked as a saraf (money-dealer) in the city of Lahore. He worked at Suha Bazaar in Lahore, trading jewels and gold. One account states that Chajju encountered a street sweeper, which led him to reconsider his current path as a businessman.

According to a Sikh version of his biography, one day a Pathan asked Chajju for his money back but Chajju did not remember having his money. Eventually, the case escalated and reached Wazir Khan, who dismissed it. However, Chajju eventually discovered that he did in-fact have the Pathan's money, aiming to return it with an additional one hundred gold mohurs as compensation, but the Pathan refused to accept it. Chajju sought the mediation of the fifth Sikh guru, Arjan. Arjan suggested that both agree that the fund be used by the Sikhs to dig a well. The well the Sikhs subsequently dug with the money was believed to have magical, healing properties. The well is located in Loha Bazaar with an opening on Kesera Bazaar, now called Gurdwara Baoli Sahib.

After his encounter with the Sikh guru, Bhajju left his ordinary life and became a bhagat and embarked on his own spiritual career of praying and meditating. He left the responsibility for his former business with his son. Chajju was a vegetarian and teetotaler, who rejected idolatry and believed in oneness of the divine. He also rejected the varna system. He took-on a number of disciples, forming a satsang. He became influenced by Sufi fakirs, meeting Sufi saints Hazrat Bala Pir Lahori, Sheikh Ismail Faheemi, and Hazrat Mian Mir. Chajju became respected by both Mian Miar and the Sikh guru Guru Arjan. A number of miraculous tales are associated with Chajju, such as him gifting a childless Muslim couple with a daughter (Chajju is said to have believed that daughters were auspicious) after giving them advice, making the Ganges river flow out of his pitcher so that an old Hindu woman could take a dip in the holy river, and that water flooded the street outside his chaubara.

Another Sikh tradition from the Gurbilases narrates that Chajju Bhagat, alongside Kahna Bhagat, Pilu, and Shah Husain, paid a visit to Guru Arjan in Amritsar when they learnt he was compiling the Ād Granth to suggest their compilations be included. Guru Arjan contemplayed but ultimately decided to reject the idea of including the compilations of Chajju and the other three figures in the Sikh scripture as they were not completely in-line with his teachings. Chajju offered the following hymns of his to be considered for inclusion into the Sikh scripture:

ਕਾਗਦ ਸੰਦੀ ਪੂਤਲੀ, ਤਊ ਨਾ ਤ੍ਰਿਯਾ ਨਿਹਾਰ।
ਯੌਂ ਹੀ ਮਾਰ ਲਿਜਾਵਹੀਂ, ਜਥਾ ਬਲੋਚਨਿ ਧਾਰ।
Kagad sandi putri tau na triya nihar. Iu hi mar le jayigi jiu Balochan di dhar.

— Chajju Bhagat
Translation:

Do not look at beautiful woman. Even though being extremely beautiful like a paper doll, they will kill you like the marauding forces of Baloch tribesmen

— G. S. Chauhan

The Sikh guru rejected the hymns as they were against the principles of being a house-holder who married, which the Sikh gurus promoted. According to the Sikh gurus, only women other than one's wife were to be avoided, not women in-general, which was a practice of ascetics who gave up the world, not Sikhs.

Chajju died in 1696 Bk. (1640 CE). Another view is that Chajju died in 1054 Hijri (ca.1644–45 CE). However, according to legend, Chajju disappeared mysteriously while meditating in his chaubara. After his death or disappearance, a number of monuments dedicated to him were constructed. During the reign of Ranjit Singh, a number of chambers and accommodations (such as a sarovar, bagh, and dharamshalas) were built attached to the complex for the yatris (pilgrims). Rudyard Kipling noted that the monument complex associated with Chajju was in poor-condition after the British annexed the Punjab. The temple of Malka Hans was constructed by devotees of Chajju Bhagat.

== Associated sites ==
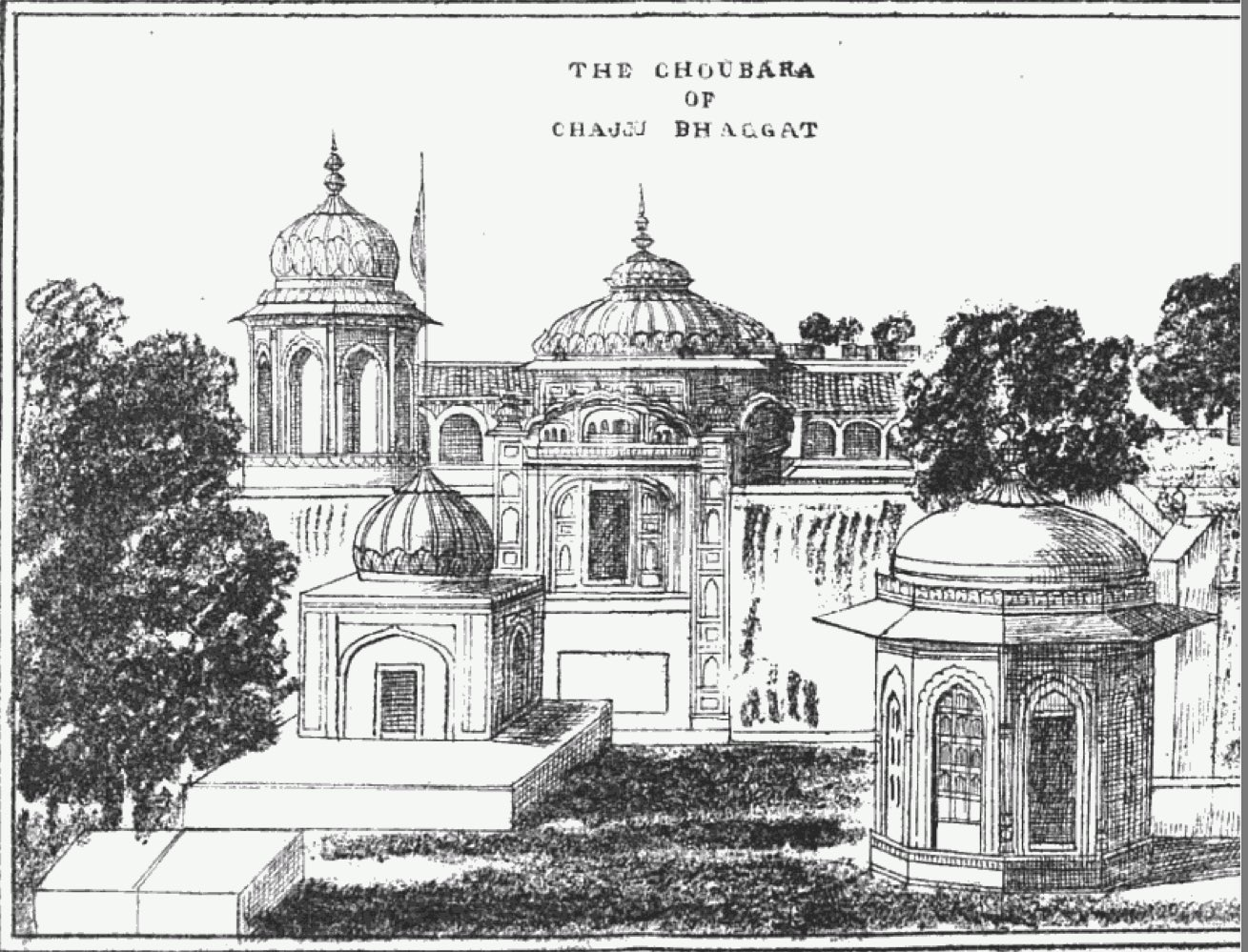
Lithograph illustration of the Chaubara of Chajju Bhagat in Lahore, published by Syad Muhammad Latif, 1892

A monument dedicated to him, known as Chajju da Chaubara ("Chajju's dwelling"), was built in Tila Bukhari Mohallah, now located within the middle of Shams Shahabuddin Convalescent Home next to Mayo Hospital in Lahore, believed to be the place Chajju resided and meditated. After his death, a marble samadh was constructed, being managed by the Dadupanthis. The monument was originally raised during Bhangi rule. The Udasi figure Bawa Pritam Das of Pakpattan constructed a mandir there and acted as the mahant. The site was associated with sadhs. Maharaja Ranjit Singh visited the site every Monday and donated to its operation. The architecture of the edifice contains both Mughal and Sikh influences. The site is now used as a makeshift mosque. The chaubara complex once consisted of a number of auxiliary structure although now only the chaubara remains.

Another chaubara monument associated with him, with the same name, was found in Dhal Mohalla, which marked the location where Chajju is said to have caused the Ganges river to flow to help an old woman bathe during Vaisakhi.
