= Punjabi Brahmins =

Punjabi Brahmins may refer to these Brahmin communities of Punjab:

- Saraswat Brahmins, a Brahmin community found throughout northern India including Punjab
- Gaur Brahmins, another Brahmin community of northern India and Punjab
