= Gharu Ram Bhagat =

Indian politician

Member of the Jammu and Kashmir Legislative Assembly
- Incumbent
- Assumed office 2024
- Constituency: Suchetgarh

Personal details
- Party: Bharatiya Janata Party
- Other political affiliations: Democratic Azad Party, Indian National Congress

Gharu Ram Bhagat is an Indian politician from Jammu and Kashmir and member of Bharatiya Janata Party. Bhagat is a member of the Jammu and Kashmir Legislative Assembly from the Suchetgarh constituency and formerly the Ranbir Singhpura constituency in Jammu district. He is affiliated with Bhartiya Janata Party since 2022 and previously till 2016. In 2016, he joined Indian National Congress. On 30 August 2022, he resigned from Congress in support of Ghulam Nabi Azad. He later joined the BJP and won from Suchetgarh in 2024 by 11,141 votes.

== Electoral performance ==
Election	Constituency	Party	Result	Votes %	Opposition Candidate	Opposition Party	Opposition vote %	Ref
2024	Suchetgarh	BJP	Won	46.32%	Bhusan Lal	INC	33.19%	
2008	Ranbir Singh Pora–Jammu South	BJP	Won	28.95%	Suman Lata Bhagat	INC	25.98%	
