= Ashok Bhagat =

Indian social worker

- Born: Azamgarh, Uttar Pradesh, India
- Other name: Ashok Rai
- Occupation: Social worker
- Years active: Since 1980
- Known for: Social Entrepreneurship programs
- Awards: Padma Shri
- Website: www.vikasbharti.net

Ashok Bhagat, popularly known as Baba ji, is an Indian social worker and the secretary of Vikas Bharti, a non-governmental organization working for the upliftment of rural population of Jharkhand.

== Early life ==
He was born in the Indian state of Uttar Pradesh, holds a master's degree in Arts and a graduate degree in Law and is a nominated leader of Swachh Bharat Abhiyaan campaign for the state of Jharkhand.

== Awards ==
The Government of India honoured him in 2015 with the Padma Shri, the fourth highest Indian civilian award for his contributions to the area of social service.
