= Shakuntala Bhagat =

Indian civil engineer

Shakuntala Bhagat FIE
- Shakuntala Bhagat, from a 2013 publication
- Born: Shakuntala Joshi; 6 February 1933
- Died: 14 October 2012 (aged 79)
- Education: Veermata Jijabai Technological Institute; University of Pennsylvania; Indian Institute of Technology, Bombay (professional work)
- Occupation: Civil engineer
- Known for: Bridge design and construction
- Spouse: Anirudh Shivprasad Bhagat

Shakuntala Bhagat FIE (née Joshi; 6 February 1933 – 14 October 2012), was the first woman civil engineer in India.

== Early life ==
Shakuntala Joshi was the daughter of bridge engineer S. B. Joshi (1906–1991).

In 1953, she became the first woman to earn a civil engineering degree at Veermata Jijabai Technological Institute in Mumbai. She earned a master's degree in civil and structural engineering at the University of Pennsylvania.

== Career ==
Bhagat was assistant professor of civil engineering and head of the Heavy Structures Laboratory at the Indian Institute of Technology in Mumbai for much of the 1960s. In 1970, she and her husband founded their own firm, Bhagat Engineering; they also founded Quadricon, a bridge construction firm specializing in a patented prefabricated modular design. She worked on design and construction of hundreds of bridges around the world, including projects in the United States, Germany, and the United Kingdom. She worked on concrete research for the Cement and Concrete Association of London.

Bhagat was a member of the Indian Road Congress and a fellow of India's Institute of Engineers. In 1972, the Bhagats received an award from the Invention Promotion Board, for their Unishear connectors. In 1993, she was recognized as the Woman Engineer of the Year.

== Personal life ==
Shakuntala Joshi married fellow civil engineer Anirudha Shivprasad Bhagat. She died in 2012, aged 79.
