= Ranbir Singh Pora–Jammu South Assembly constituency =

Constituency of the Jammu and Kashmir legislative assembly in India

Coordinates: 32.61°N 74.73°E

Ranbir Singh Pora–Jammu South
- Constituency No. 74 for the Jammu and Kashmir Legislative Assembly

Constituency details
- Country: India
- State: Jammu and Kashmir
- District: Jammu
- Lok Sabha constituency: Jammu
- Established: 2022

Member of Legislative Assembly
- Incumbent Narinder Singh Raina
- Party: BJP
- Alliance: NDA
- Elected year: 2024

Ranbir Singh Pora–Jammu South Assembly constituency is one of the 90 constituencies in the Jammu and Kashmir Legislative Assembly of Jammu and Kashmir a north state of India. Ranbir Singh Pora is also part of Jammu Lok Sabha constituency.

== Members of the Legislative Assembly ==
| Election | Member | Party |
|---|---|---|
| 1962 | Bhagat Chhaju Ram | Jammu & Kashmir National Conference |
| 1967 | K. Singh | Indian National Congress |
| 1972 | Rangil Singh | Indian National Congress |
| 1977 | Janak Raj Gupta | Indian National Congress |
| 1983 | Janak Raj Gupta | Indian National Congress |
| 1987 | Ranjit Singh | Indian National Congress |
| 1996 | Ram Chand | Bahujan Samaj Party |
| 2002 | Suman Lata Bhagat | Indian National Congress |
| 2008 | Gharu Ram Bhagat | Bharatiya Janata Party |
| 2014 | Gagan Bhagat | Bharatiya Janata Party |
| 2024 | Dr. Narinder Singh Raina | Bharatiya Janata Party |

== Election results ==
=== Assembly Election 2024 ===
2024 Jammu and Kashmir Legislative Assembly election : Ranbir Singh Pora–Jammu South
| Party | Candidate | Votes | % | ±% |
|---|---|---|---|---|
| BJP | Dr. Narinder Singh Raina | 43,317 | 49.23 | ▲7.58 |
| INC | Raman Bhalla | 41,351 | 47.00 | ▲41.05 |
| BSP | Gurdev Raj | 737 | 0.84 | ▼0.73 |
| NOTA | None of the Above | 432 | 0.49 | ▼0.05 |
| Margin of victory | | 1,966 | 2.23 | ▼19.83 |
| Turnout | | 87,990 | 90.92 | ▲13.38 |
| Registered electors | | 96,779 | | ▲21.63 |
| BJP hold | | Swing | ▲7.58 | |

=== Assembly Election 2014 ===
2014 Jammu and Kashmir Legislative Assembly election : Ranbir Singh Pora–Jammu South
| Party | Candidate | Votes | % | ±% |
|---|---|---|---|---|
| BJP | Gagan Bhagat | 25,696 | 41.65 | ▲12.70 |
| JKPDP | Bushan Lal | 12,086 | 19.59 | ▲18.41 |
| Independent | B. R. Kundal | 11,140 | 18.06 | New |
| JKNC | Romesh Lal Mottan | 5,852 | 9.49 | ▼12.23 |
| INC | Suman Lata Bhagat | 3,665 | 5.94 | ▼20.04 |
| BSP | Ajaib Singh Motan | 966 | 1.57 | ▼6.78 |
| Independent | Devinder Singh | 594 | 0.96 | New |
| NOTA | None of the Above | 336 | 0.54 | New |
| Margin of victory | | 13,610 | 22.06 | ▲19.09 |
| Turnout | | 61,694 | 77.53 | ▲0.98 |
| Registered electors | | 79,570 | | ▲10.90 |
| BJP hold | | Swing | ▲12.70 | |

=== Assembly Election 2008 ===
2008 Jammu and Kashmir Legislative Assembly election : Ranbir Singh Pora–Jammu South
| Party | Candidate | Votes | % | ±% |
|---|---|---|---|---|
| BJP | Gharu Ram Bhagat | 15,902 | 28.95 | New |
| INC | Suman Lata Bhagat | 14,272 | 25.98 | ▼15.42 |
| JKNC | Romesh Lal Mottan | 11,929 | 21.72 | ▲15.25 |
| JKNPP | Karan Kumar Bhagat | 5,104 | 9.29 | New |
| BSP | Ajaib Singh Motan | 4,585 | 8.35 | ▲1.13 |
| SP | Sham Lal | 793 | 1.44 | New |
| JKPDP | Bishamber Dass Gorka | 650 | 1.18 | New |
| Margin of victory | | 1,630 | 2.97 | ▼3.73 |
| Turnout | | 54,932 | 76.56 | ▲15.17 |
| Registered electors | | 71,752 | | ▼7.28 |
| BJP gain from INC | | Swing | ▼12.45 | |

=== Assembly Election 2002 ===
2002 Jammu and Kashmir Legislative Assembly election : Ranbir Singh Pora–Jammu South
| Party | Candidate | Votes | % | ±% |
|---|---|---|---|---|
| INC | Suman Lata Bhagat | 19,669 | 41.40 | ▲7.68 |
| NCP | Romesh Lal Mottan | 16,485 | 34.70 | New |
| BSP | Rachh Paul Singh | 3,430 | 7.22 | ▼30.85 |
| JKNC | Krishan Lal Bhagat | 3,072 | 6.47 | ▼10.16 |
| Independent | Jatinder Kumar | 2,145 | 4.52 | New |
| Independent | Ajaib Singh | 738 | 1.55 | New |
| SAP | Dr. Mohinder Singh | 610 | 1.28 | New |
| Margin of victory | | 3,184 | 6.70 | ▲2.35 |
| Turnout | | 47,507 | 61.40 | ▼5.13 |
| Registered electors | | 77,388 | | ▲46.48 |
| INC gain from BSP | | Swing | ▲3.33 | |

=== Assembly Election 1996 ===
1996 Jammu and Kashmir Legislative Assembly election : Ranbir Singh Pora–Jammu South
| Party | Candidate | Votes | % | ±% |
|---|---|---|---|---|
| BSP | Ram Chand | 13,379 | 38.07 | New |
| INC | Romesh Lal | 11,850 | 33.72 | ▼3.79 |
| JKNC | Raj Kumar | 5,843 | 16.63 | New |
| BJP | Vijay Kumar | 3,372 | 9.60 | ▼8.85 |
| JD | Ved Parkash | 699 | 1.99 | New |
| Margin of victory | | 1,529 | 4.35 | ▼7.72 |
| Turnout | | 35,143 | 67.95 | ▼10.04 |
| Registered electors | | 52,830 | | ▲8.03 |
| BSP gain from INC | | Swing | ▲0.56 | |

=== Assembly Election 1987 ===
1987 Jammu and Kashmir Legislative Assembly election : Ranbir Singh Pora–Jammu South
| Party | Candidate | Votes | % | ±% |
|---|---|---|---|---|
| INC | Ranjit Singh | 14,043 | 37.51 | ▼12.22 |
| Independent | Thakur Dass | 9,523 | 25.44 | New |
| BJP | Chuni Lal | 6,904 | 18.44 | ▲11.61 |
| Independent | Girdhari Lal | 2,961 | 7.91 | New |
| Independent | Sain Dass | 1,817 | 4.85 | New |
| CPI | Balkar Singh | 880 | 2.35 | New |
| Independent | Sushil Kumar | 462 | 1.23 | New |
| Margin of victory | | 4,520 | 12.07 | ▼2.21 |
| Turnout | | 37,439 | 77.47 | ▲4.10 |
| Registered electors | | 48,903 | | ▲11.91 |
| INC hold | | Swing | ▼12.22 | |

=== Assembly Election 1983 ===
1983 Jammu and Kashmir Legislative Assembly election : Ranbir Singh Pora–Jammu South
| Party | Candidate | Votes | % | ±% |
|---|---|---|---|---|
| INC | Janak Raj Gupta | 15,744 | 49.73 | ▲1.27 |
| JKNC | Rajinder Singh Chib | 11,221 | 35.44 | ▲30.08 |
| BJP | Chuni Lal | 2,164 | 6.83 | New |
| Independent | Darshan Lal | 1,117 | 3.53 | New |
| Independent | Tilak Raj Dogra | 841 | 2.66 | New |
| Independent | Daljit Singh | 229 | 0.72 | New |
| Margin of victory | | 4,523 | 14.29 | ▼6.62 |
| Turnout | | 31,661 | 73.94 | ▼0.95 |
| Registered electors | | 43,697 | | ▲23.33 |
| INC hold | | Swing | ▲1.27 | |

=== Assembly Election 1977 ===
1977 Jammu and Kashmir Legislative Assembly election : Ranbir Singh Pora–Jammu South
| Party | Candidate | Votes | % | ±% |
|---|---|---|---|---|
| INC | Janak Raj Gupta | 12,603 | 48.46 | ▼12.00 |
| JP | Rangil Singh | 7,166 | 27.55 | New |
| Independent | Chuni Lal | 3,298 | 12.68 | New |
| JKNC | Piara Singh | 1,395 | 5.36 | New |
| Independent | Tilak Raj | 960 | 3.69 | New |
| Independent | Durga Dass | 501 | 1.93 | New |
| Margin of victory | | 5,437 | 20.91 | ▼16.37 |
| Turnout | | 26,007 | 74.38 | ▼5.29 |
| Registered electors | | 35,431 | | ▲24.17 |
| INC hold | | Swing | ▼12.00 | |

=== Assembly Election 1972 ===
1972 Jammu and Kashmir Legislative Assembly election : Ranbir Singh Pora–Jammu South
| Party | Candidate | Votes | % | ±% |
|---|---|---|---|---|
| INC | Rangil Singh | 13,577 | 60.46 | ▲10.47 |
| Independent | Sain Dass | 5,206 | 23.18 | New |
| Independent | Baldev Singh Chib | 1,772 | 7.89 | New |
| Independent | Sat Pal | 1,130 | 5.03 | New |
| ABJS | Badri Nath | 453 | 2.02 | ▼4.71 |
| Margin of victory | | 8,371 | 37.28 | ▲16.52 |
| Turnout | | 22,456 | 80.84 | ▲7.36 |
| Registered electors | | 28,535 | | ▲19.37 |
| INC hold | | Swing | ▲10.47 | |

=== Assembly Election 1967 ===
1967 Jammu and Kashmir Legislative Assembly election : Ranbir Singh Pora–Jammu South
| Party | Candidate | Votes | % | ±% |
|---|---|---|---|---|
| INC | K. Singh | 8,525 | 49.99 | New |
| JKNC | J. Raj | 4,985 | 29.23 | ▼26.29 |
| ABJS | B. Singh | 1,148 | 6.73 | New |
| Democratic National Conference | S. Chand | 824 | 4.83 | ▼29.21 |
| Independent | S. Singh | 597 | 3.50 | New |
| Independent | F. Mohammed | 568 | 3.33 | New |
| Independent | M. Singh | 227 | 1.33 | New |
| Margin of victory | | 3,540 | 20.76 | ▼0.72 |
| Turnout | | 17,053 | 76.61 | ▼6.31 |
| Registered electors | | 23,904 | | ▲25.70 |
| INC gain from JKNC | | Swing | ▼5.53 | |

=== Assembly Election 1962 ===
1962 Jammu and Kashmir Legislative Assembly election : Ranbir Singh Pora–Jammu South
| Party | Candidate | Votes | % | ±% |
|---|---|---|---|---|
| JKNC | Bhagat Chhaju Ram | 8,199 | 55.52 | New |
| Democratic National Conference | Shiv Ram | 5,027 | 34.04 | New |
| Harijan Mandal | Karam Chand S/O Gulab Dass | 1,207 | 8.17 | New |
| JPP | Karam Chand S/O Pohlu | 334 | 2.26 | New |
| Margin of victory | | 3,172 | 21.48 | |
| Turnout | | 14,767 | 79.40 | |
| Registered electors | | 19,017 | | |
| JKNC win (new seat) | | | | |

== See also ==
- Ranbir Singh Pora
- List of constituencies of Jammu and Kashmir Legislative Assembly
