= Dhiren Bhagat =

Indian journalist (1957–1988)

Dhiren Bhagat (1957–1988) was an Indian journalist. His writing appeared in prominent publications of the pre-1990 era, and have been compiled in a book published by Viking. A contributor to the mainstream Indian and British media, his work was widely noticed, as was his early death at the age of 31.

He is also known for his writing on the insurgency in Punjab in the 1980s.

== Personal life ==
Born in 1957 in Tokyo, Japan, he died in November 1988 in Delhi, at the age of 31. He was an alumnus of Merton College, University of Oxford.

== Role in the media ==
Jug Suraiya, a journalist since the 1960s who was part of the founding team of the Junion Statesman (better known as the JS) has commented on the role played by Bhagat in that iconic youth magazine of the mid-1960s to the mid-1970s. Bhagat was known for his writings in the Vinod Mehta-edited The Sunday Observer, India's first weekend newspaper.

His role in prominent papers of the time, including The Indian Post has also been noted. Since his work was published in the pre-Internet era, much of it is not easily accessible online, or easy to be cited. Some of his writing was critical of the Indian government's role in the Punjab insurgency.

His writing on the Punjab had been widely noted, and he was given credit for breaking some stories in The Indian Post and The Observer (London).

His work has been cited in a number of books and research articles.

== Obituary references ==
Following Bhagat's sudden death in a road accident, the noted Indian editor Khushwant Singh commented: "...nothing will compensate for the loss that Indian journalism suffered on the death of this bright, erudite, but unpredictable young man in the prime of his life." This despite the fact that Bhagat himself penned and got published a "pre obituary" for Khushwant Singh, when the latter was still much alive.
