= Kanha Bhagat =

Punjabi religious figure

Kanha Bhagat (Kānā) was a Punjabi religious figure active during the period of the fifth Sikh guru, Guru Arjan. His works were considered but rejected for inclusion into the Sikh scripture.

== Biography ==
Kanha was a Vaishnavite saint living in Lahore. Kanha was a yogi following the path of knowledge (gyan marag), claiming to have lived for 500-years. However, Sikh sources claim he was egotistical. According to the Gurbilases, Kanha Bhagat, alongside Chajju Bhagat, Pilu, and Shah Hussain met with Guru Arjan to discuss the possibility of the guru including their works in the scripture he was composing. According to Sikh sources, Kanha arrived in a chariot whilst the others arrived by-foot.

When Kanha was asked to recite his hymns he would like to be considered to be included, he shared the following hymns: (Note: Jvala Singh translates the verses as follows: "I am that, oh I am that! Which the Vedas and Purāṇas have sung about, and which no one has ever been able to search and find! That which Narad and Saraswati serve, and which all other Gods and Goddesses serve That which Brahma, Vishnu, and Shiva worship, and that to which all serve! Says Kānā, that is my True Form, the infinite, the indescribable, the undivided!")

ਓਹੀ ਰੇ ਮੈ ਓਹੀ ਰੇ।
ਜਾਕਉ ਬੇਦ ਪੁਰਾਨ ਸਭ ਗਾਵਹਿ, ਖੋਜਤਿ ਖੋਜ ਨ ਕੋਈ ਰੇ।
ਜਾਕੋ ਨਾਰਦ ਸਾਰਦ ਸੇਵਹਿ, ਸੇਵਹਿ ਦੇਵੀ ਦੇਵਾ ਰੇ।
ਬ੍ਰਹਮਾ ਬਿਸਨ ਮਹੇਸ ਅਰਾਧਹਿ, ਸਭਿ ਕਰਦੇ ਜਾਕੀ ਸੇਵਾ ਰੇ।
ਕਹਿ ਕਾਨ੍ਹਾ, ਅਸ ਮਮ ਸਰੂਪ ਹੈ, ਅਪਰੰਪਰ ਅਲਖ ਅਭੇਵਾ ਰੇ।
Ohi re main Ohi re. Ja kau Bed Puran sabh gawhe khojat khoj na koi re. Ja kau Narad Sarad sewahe, sewahe Devi Deva re. Bramahe Bisan Mahes aradheh, sabh karde ja ki sewa re?

— Kanha Bhagat
Translation:

He is that, whose praise is sung by Vedas, Puranas but have not been able to fathom him. Narad and other great saints worship him. All the Gods and Goddesses also worship him. Brahma, Vishnu and Shiva also worship him. Everybody is serving him.

— G. S. Chauhan

Guru Arjan decided to reject including Kanha and the others' works in the scripture as he believed they were not in-agreement with Sikh tenets. According to the Sikh guru, Kanha's hymns were vague and may lead people to sinning in the era of kalyug. In-response, Kanha is said to have cursed the Sikh guru angrily and stated that he would be destroyed. Arjan replied that the body is perishable but the soul (atma) is eternal. As per Kavi Santokh Singh in his Suraj Prakash, the verses were rejected by Guru Arjan, who recognized them as being technically philosophically correct but would lead to egotism in the age of kaljug. According to Daljeet Singh, the key philosophical difference between the Sikh gurus and Kanha was regarding divine grace. While Kanha believed in contemplative effort on the individual to achieve a state of aham brahm asmi, the Sikhs advocated for the grace of god. Hymns authored by Kahna were included in the padas of Surdas.
