= Gagan Bhagat =

Indian politician

Gagan Bhagat is an Indian politician and a senior Hindu leader from Jammu Province of the Jammu and Kashmir National Conference (J&K NC). Bhagat was a member of the Jammu and Kashmir Legislative Assembly from the Ranbir Singhpura constituency in Jammu district. Bhagat was appointed deputy chief spokesperson of Jammu and Kashmir National Conference in March 2022. He is the prominent Hindu face of the party after a few Hindu leaders left the J&K NC from Jammu Province.
