= Shantilal Bhagat =

Indian American Brethren writer

Shantilal Premchand Bhagat
- Born: 1923; India
- Died: 7 July 2017 (aged 93–94); La Verne, California, U.S.
- Occupations: Director of Eco-Justice Concerns, Minister
- Organization: Church of the Brethren
- Notable work: Creation in Crisis (1990), Racism & the Church: Overcoming the Idolatry (1995)

Shantilal Premchand Bhagat (1923 – 7 July 2017) was the Director of Eco-Justice Concerns for the Church of the Brethren and the denomination's representative to the United Nations. He was an ordained minister in the denomination. He was also the Brethren representative to the National Council of the Churches of Christ in the USA's Eco-Justice Working Group.

== Biography ==
Bhagat was from India. For sixteen years, he worked at the Rural Service Center in Anklesvar. He moved to the United States to work for the General Board. He took on a variety of roles for the organization including coordinator of Social Services for the Foreign Mission Commission, Community Development consultant, Asia representative, United Nations representative, Global Justice consultant, Education/Economic Justice consultant, staff, and then director of Eco-Justice and Rural/Small Church Concerns. He continued with the General Board for over 30 years before his retirement.

Bhagat sought to expand upon the traditional Brethren support for pacifism to include environmental concerns, saying "Working on these... issues is part of the Brethren peace witness because we cannot be at peace unless we're at peace with the earth." In 1990, Bhagat's book, Creation in Crisis was published. The book was especially designed for use as Sunday school material and small group discussion with study and discussion questions included, although it can also be read individually. Creation in Crisis was part of a wave of Ecotheology works which began in the 1980s and continued strongly in the 1990s. The book is included in many Ecotheology bibliographies.

The Parish Ministries Commission of the Church of the Brethren General Board commissioned Bhagat to write about racism and Christianity, culminating in his 1995 two-part work, Racism & the Church: Overcoming the Idolatry. In the same year, he was honored by the Black Church Committee in appreciation for his published works on the topic of race.

In published his book, Your Health and the Environment: A Christian Perspective. For Earth Day 1998, the National Council of Churches sent a packet to each congregation of each of its member denominations, 73,000 congregations in total. This packet included Bhagat's book, a two-session adult study guide for the book, and additional resources.

Bhagat participated in the 29 November 1970 ceremony which founded the Church of North India as a representative of the Church of the Brethren. From 2000 to 2001, Bhagat was part of a delegation from the American Church of the Brethren General Board which explored recognition of Brethren in that country who had joined the Church of North India in 1970 but later withdrew.

In his role as director of Eco-Justice Concerns for the Church of the Brethren General Board, Bhagat produced a newsletter entitled Between the Flood and the Rainbow. This was the first periodical published by the General Board to be published online. It ceased publication in 1997 but resumed in 2002 under the non-profit Ecumenical Eco-Justice Network with Bhagat continuing his editorial role.

Bhagat died on July 7, 2017, in La Verne, California, where he had lived the last years of his life.

== Published works ==
- — (1975). Dell, Robert (ed.). "Dare We Feed the Hungry?" Proceedings of a symposium on environmental ethics held at Manchester College, 13 February 1975. Archived from the original on 7 May 2021.
- — (1983). What does it profit...? Christian dialogue on the U.S. economy. Elgin, IL: Brethren Press. ISBN 9780871789273. OCLC 9324587.
- Heckman, Shirley J.; — (1983). What does it profit...? : Teacher's guide. Elgin, IL: Brethren Press. OCLC 9733719.
- — (1985). The family farm: Can it be saved?. Elgin, IL: Brethren Press. ISBN 0-87178-227-8. OCLC 468734836.
- — (1990). "Global economy: none of God's business?". Proceedings of the third consultation on the heritage of the first and radical reformations on the theme "Christian faith and economics" : held at Komenskeho Evangelicka, Bohoslovecka Fakulta, 115 55 Praha 1, Jungmannova 9, Czechoslovakia, June 20–26, 1989. OCLC 33190073.
- — (1990). Creation in crisis: Responding to God's covenant. Elgin, IL: Brethren Press. ISBN 978-0-87178-164-2. OCLC 22274731.
- — (1991). Kinzie, Steve (ed.). Creation: Called to care: Statement of the Church of the Brethren 1991 annual conference. Elgin, IL: Brethren Press. OCLC 255511770.
- Sollenberger, David; — (1991). The earth is the Lord's (VHS). Elgin, IL: Church of the Brethren General Board. OCLC 273979631.
- —, ed. (1994). God's earth our home: A resource for congregational study and action on environmental and economic justice. Eco-Justice Working Group, National Council of Churches of Christ in the USA. OCLC 36599714. - This packet includes: 12 study sessions, worship resources, glossary, leader’s guide, creation awareness chart, and segments on environmental racism and corporate responsibility.
- — (ed.). Now Is The Time to Heal Our Racial Brokenness (Congregational Resource Packet). Elgin, IL: Church of the Brethren General Board.
- — (1995). Racism & the Church: Overcoming the Idolatry Vol 1 study resources. Elgin, IL: Church of the Brethren. OCLC 33190058.
- — (1995). Racism & the Church: Overcoming the Idolatry Vol 2 study resources. Elgin, IL: Church of the Brethren.
- — (1998). Your health and the environment: A Christian perspective: A study/action guide for congregations. Eco-Justice Working Group, National Council of Churches of Christ in the USA. OCLC 40358057. (Excerpt)
- — (1999). "Healing ourselves and the earth". In Schut, Michael (ed.). Simpler living, compassionate life: A Christian perspective. Denver, CO: Morehouse Group. ISBN 1-889108-62-6. OCLC 42867986.
- — (2001). Church union in India: The Church of the Brethren experience. Elgin, IL: Global Mission Partnerships, Church of the Brethren General Board. OCLC 48629594.
