= Pilu (poet) =

Punjabi poet (1580–1675)

Pilu (c. 1580–1675) was a Punjabi dramatic poet who is known for his rendition of the Punjabi tragic romance Mirza Sahiban. He was a contemporary of Mughal Emperor Akbar. His disciple was Hafiz Barkhurdar.

== Biography ==
Not much is known about the identity of Pilu. Some sources identify his birthplace as Amritsar, and describe him as a resident of Bhaun town in Chakwal.

Pilu was a dramatic poet whose poetry described the political, social, and economic conditions of Punjab at the time in poetic language. The quintessential example of which is his seminal work Mirza Sahiban. His poetry is in Punjabi and reflects the culture of the Thal region.

According to Sikh sources he lived in the age of Guru Arjan and met him to include his compositions in the Sikh scriptures. The Gurbilases narrates that Pilu, alongside Kahna Bhagat, Chajju Bhagat, and Shah Husain, paid a visit to Guru Arjan in Amritsar when they learnt he was compiling the Ād Granth to suggest their compilations be included. Guru Arjan contemplated but ultimately decided to reject the idea of including their works in the Sikh scripture as they were not in-line with Sikh tenets as per the guru's analysis and judgement. The hymn by Pilu considered for inclusion was as follows:

ਪੀਲੋ ਅਸਾਂ ਨਾਲੋਂ ਸੇ ਭਲੇ ਜੰਮਦਿਆਂ ਜੁ ਮੂਏ।
ਓਨਾਂ ਚਿਕੜਿ ਪਾਂਵ ਨਾ ਬੋੜਿਆ, ਨਾ ਆਲੂਦ ਭਏ।
Pilo asan nalon se bhale jamdian jo mue. Onhan chikar pao na dobia alood bhae.

— Pilu
Translation:

O Pilo, those who died at the time of birth itself were better than you because they did not come into this unclean world and dirtied their feet. They escaped clean.

— G. S. Chauhan

Guru Arjan responded that birth, death, pleasure, and pain were all due to God's hukam (command). The guru also stated that it was possible to achieve enlightenment while being in the human form. Thus, Pilu's proposed hymns were rejected.

== Location of tomb ==
In 2019 Pilu's burial place was identified and a tomb was built upon it by the efforts of local government in the village of Peelu Wains in Noorpur Thal Tehsil in Khushab District of Punjab, Pakistan.
