= Pritam Das (Udasi) =

Religious figure

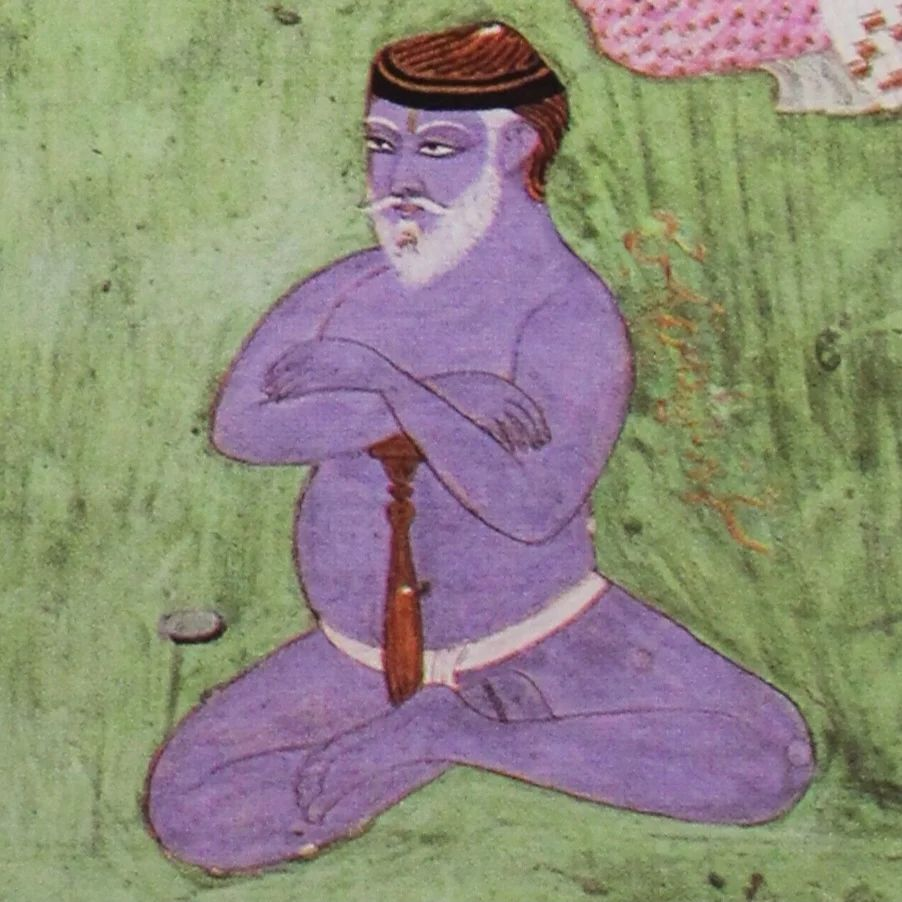
Baba Pritam Das Udasi, detail from a Hyderabadi painting, ca.1780

Pritam Das (1722 or 1752 – 1831) was an Udasi saint and mahant. He conducted construction projects to support religious infrastructure and founded akharas. Followers of Pritam Das are known as Nanga Udasis.

== Biography ==
Pritam Das was born as Karam Chand into a Saraswat Brahmin family in either 1722 or 1752 in what is now Hoshiarpur district. He received an education in basic Urdu. At the age of eleven, he started travelling around with sadhus and he met the Udasi figure Sangat Das, who initiated him as his disciple, receiving the new name Pritam Das. Later while going on pilgrimages around the northern Indian subcontinent, he became a disciple of the Mihanshahi Udasi scholar and preacher Bankhandi, who bestowed the title nirban ("without desire") upon Pritam Das. After this, he travelled to the Deccan in southern India, where he became acquainted with Nanak Chand, the uncle of Diwan Chandu Lal of Hyderabad. Nanak Chand gave a large sum of 700,000 rupees to Pritam Das, who used it to found a central organization of the Udasis in Allahabad, the Panchayati Akhara in 1779. The motivation to set-up the Panchayti Akhara was to support gurpurabs by providing boarding and lodging to for religious figures visiting shrines. Furthermore, he established akharas at Kankhal in Haridwar and Kashi (Varanasi).

Between 1781 and 1784, he constructed, alongside another Udasi named Santokh Das, a hansli (canal) connecting the Shahi Nahar irrigation-channel to the sarovars of Amritsar to continuously provide them with a water-source. In 1783, Pritam Das and Santokh Das brought a piece of a tall sāl tree from Dera Ram Rai (present-day Dehradun) which they used as material to construct a flagpole that they installed a Nishan Sahib on, with the flagpole being erected in-front of a pre-existing bunga near the Akal Takht, with the bunga then acquiring the name Jhanda Bunga as a result.

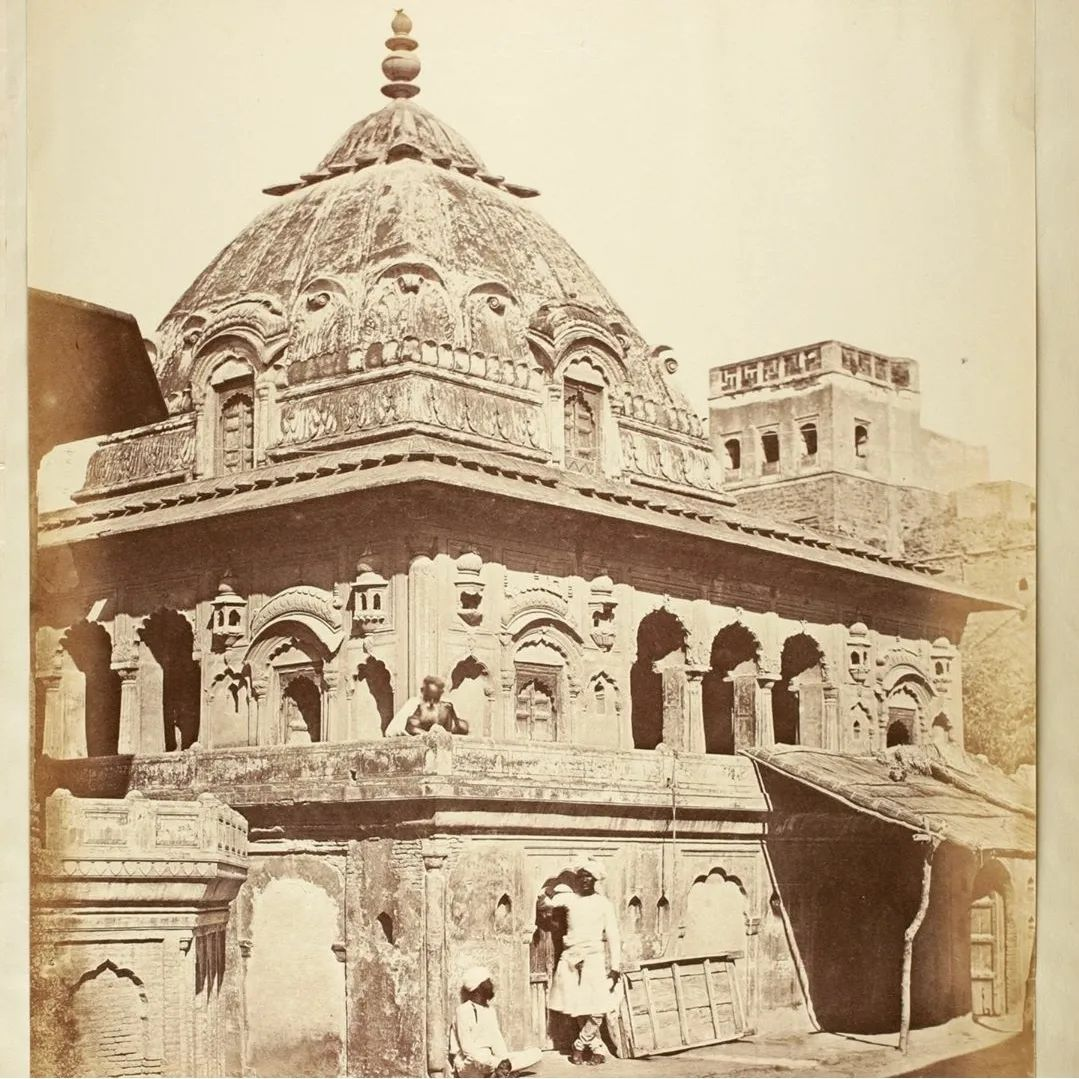
Photograph titled 'A Temple in Amritsar' taken in 1859 by Felice Beato. Identified as the original Udasi shrine of the Sangalwala Akhara in Amritsar.

At Bazaar Mai Sevan, Amritsar, he established the Sanglan Wala Akhara in 1788 (some sources claim it was established earlier in 1781 with the original name Nirban Akhara), including an internal temple within it.

During the 1819 Haridwar Kumbh Mela, some Bairagis protested and attacked the Udasis because they had a procession using the Guru Granth Sahib, so Pritam Das complained to Sikh chiefs, who reprimanded the Bairagis. Pritam Das died in Amritsar in 1831. Followers of Pirtam Das are known as Nanga Udasis. They wear a kara (bracelet) and a waist-chain known as a janjiri.
