= Bhagat Trilochan =

Indian saint

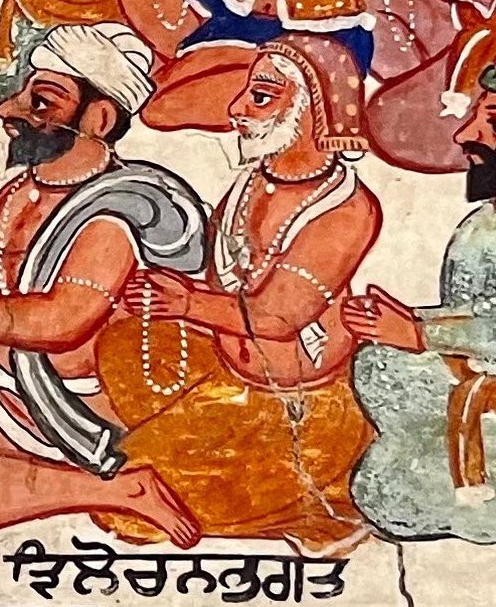
- Detail of Bhagat Trilochan (centre) from a Sikh fresco, circa mid-19th century
- Born: c. 1269; Barsi, District Solapur, Maharashtra
- Years active: Mid-13th century
- Notable work: Four hymns in Adi Granth, five hymns in Rajasthani manuscripts
- Title: Bhagat

Trilochan, also spelt as Tarlochan, was a celebrated medieval Indian saint and one of devotee whose hymns are present in Guru Granth Sahib, the holy book of Sikhs.

== Life history ==
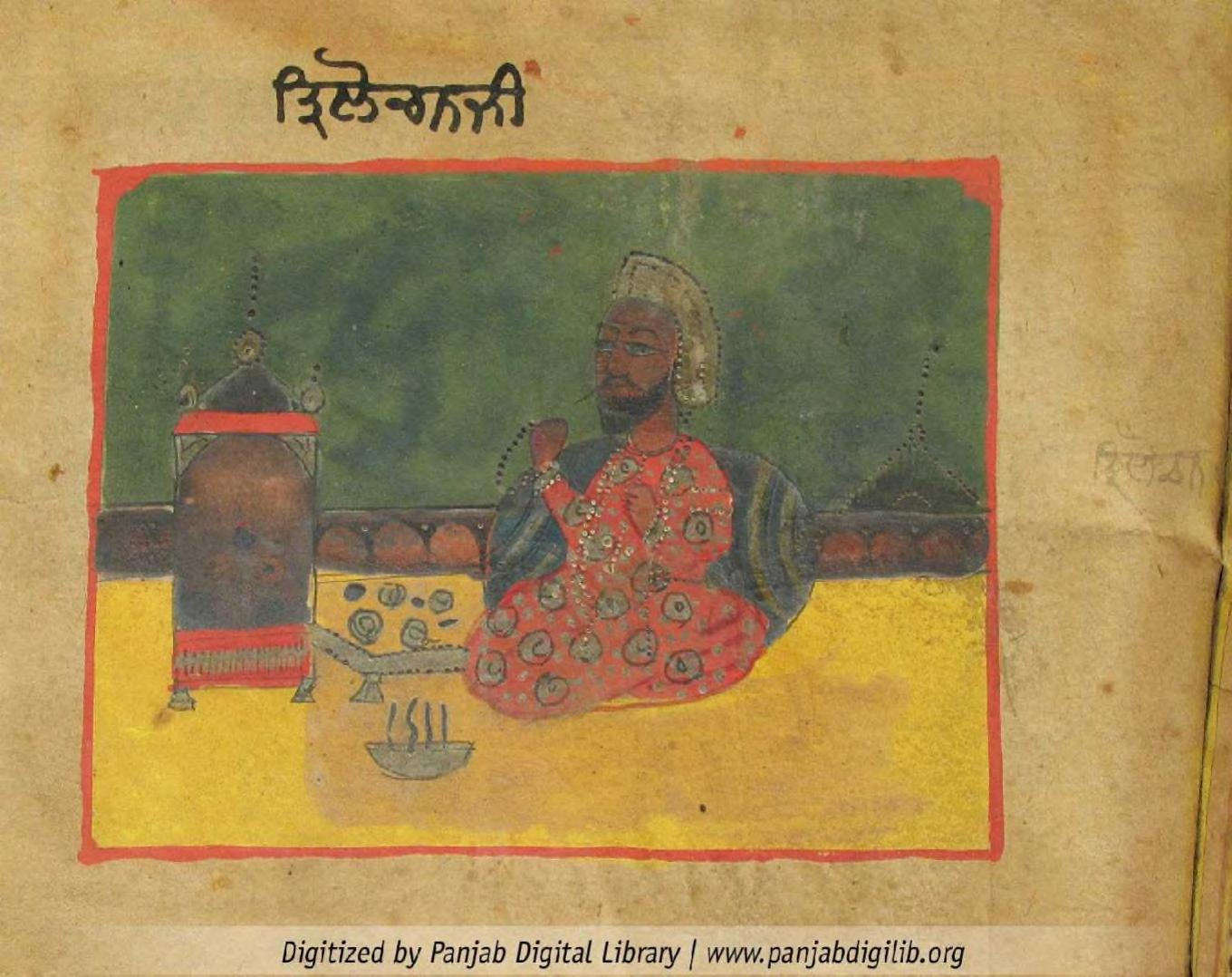
Painting of Bhagat Trilochan, from a folio within an illustrated manuscript of the Prem Ambodh Pothi

As per Mahankosh, He was born on 1269 in a Vaishya family and was dweller of Barsi (Solapur District, Maharashtra). Most of scholars accepted his birth in the mid-13th century.

== Poetry ==
=== Trilochan and Adi Granth ===
There are four shabads by Bhagat Tirlochan in Sri Guru Granth Sahib Ji. In these he has condemned superficial rituals and pretentious renunciation and stressed the holiness of the heart.

The following hymns of Trilochan are found in the Sri Guru Granth Sahib Ji:

Sri Raag, Trilochan p. 92 SGGS Read at SikhiToTheMax

Bhagat Trilochan admonishes mortals:

The mind is totally attached to Maya; the mortal has forgotten his fear of old age and death.
Gazing upon his family, he blossoms forth like the lotus flower; the deceitful person watches and covets the homes of others. (1)
When the powerful Messenger of Death comes, no one can stand against his awesome power.
Rare, very rare, is that friend who comes and says,
"O my Beloved, take me into Your Embrace! O my Lord, please save me!"(1)Pause. Continued...

— Sri Raag, Trilochan p.92 SGGS

Raag Gujari, Padas of Trilochan Jee, Ghar 1 p. 525 SGGS Read at SikhiToTheMax

A Hermit, a Sanyasi, a Brahmin called Jai Chand, a Jogi, and a Kapria held a religious discussion in which each maintained the superiority of his own sect. they came in the heat of their arguments to Trilochan, and he, knowing that they were all hypocrites, addressed them each in turn as follows:

One Universal Creator God. By The Grace Of The True Guru:

You have not cleansed the filth from within yourself, although outwardly, you wear the dress of a renunciate.

In the heart-lotus of your self, you have not recognized God - why have you become a Sannyaasee? ||1||

Deluded by doubt, O Jai Chand,

you have not realized the Lord, the embodiment of supreme bliss. ||1||Pause|| Continued...

Raag Dhanasari, Trilochan p. 695 SGGS Read at SikhiToTheMax

Trilochan, engaged in his devotions, neglected his worldly calling, and this led to his straitened domestic circumstances. Thereupon his wife became discontented and upbraided God. The following is Trilochan’s remonstrance. He endeavoured to console her by telling her that her distress was the result of her sins.

One Universal Creator God. By The Grace Of The True Guru:

Why do you slander the Lord? You are ignorant and deluded.

Pain and pleasure are the result of your own actions. ||1||Pause||

The moon dwells in Shiva's forehead; it takes its cleansing bath in the Ganges.

Among the men of the moon's family, Krishna was born;

even so, the stains from its past actions remain on the moon's face. ||1||

== Among Ravidasis ==
Ravidasis acknowledge Satgur Trilochan and preach his teaching and thought, as Guru Ravidas in his devotional hymn acknowledge and admire Satgur Trilochan as great devotee among Kabir, Sadhana, Sain, Namdev: Initially the Ravidassia revered the Guru Granth Sahib of the Sikhs, which was the only repository of Ravidass' devotional poetry. However, following their schism from mainstream Sikhs, the Ravidassi compiled their own holy book of Ravidass' teachings, the Amritbani Guru Ravidass Ji, and many Ravidassia temples now use this book in place of the Guru Granth Sahib. But they have not inserted Bhagat Sadhna Vani in it. But Dera Sach Khand Ballan of Jallandhar, Punjab on 30 January 2010 at the 633rd birth anniversary of Ravidass announced the objectives of Ravidassia religion as to propagate the bani and teachings of Ravidas, Balmiki, Namdev, Kabir, Trilochan, Sain and Sadhna.
