= Suman Lata Bhagat =

Indian politician

Minister for Health and Medical Education, Government of Jammu and Kashmir
- In office 2002 - 2008

Personal details
- Party: Indian National Congress

Suman Lata Bhagat is an Indian politician and former Minister of Health and Medical Education in the Government of Jammu and Kashmir. She is a leader of Indian National Congress and was elected in the Ranbir Singh Pura constituency for a seat in the Jammu and Kashmir Legislative Assembly.
