= Bhagat Sadhana =

12th-century Indian poet and mystic

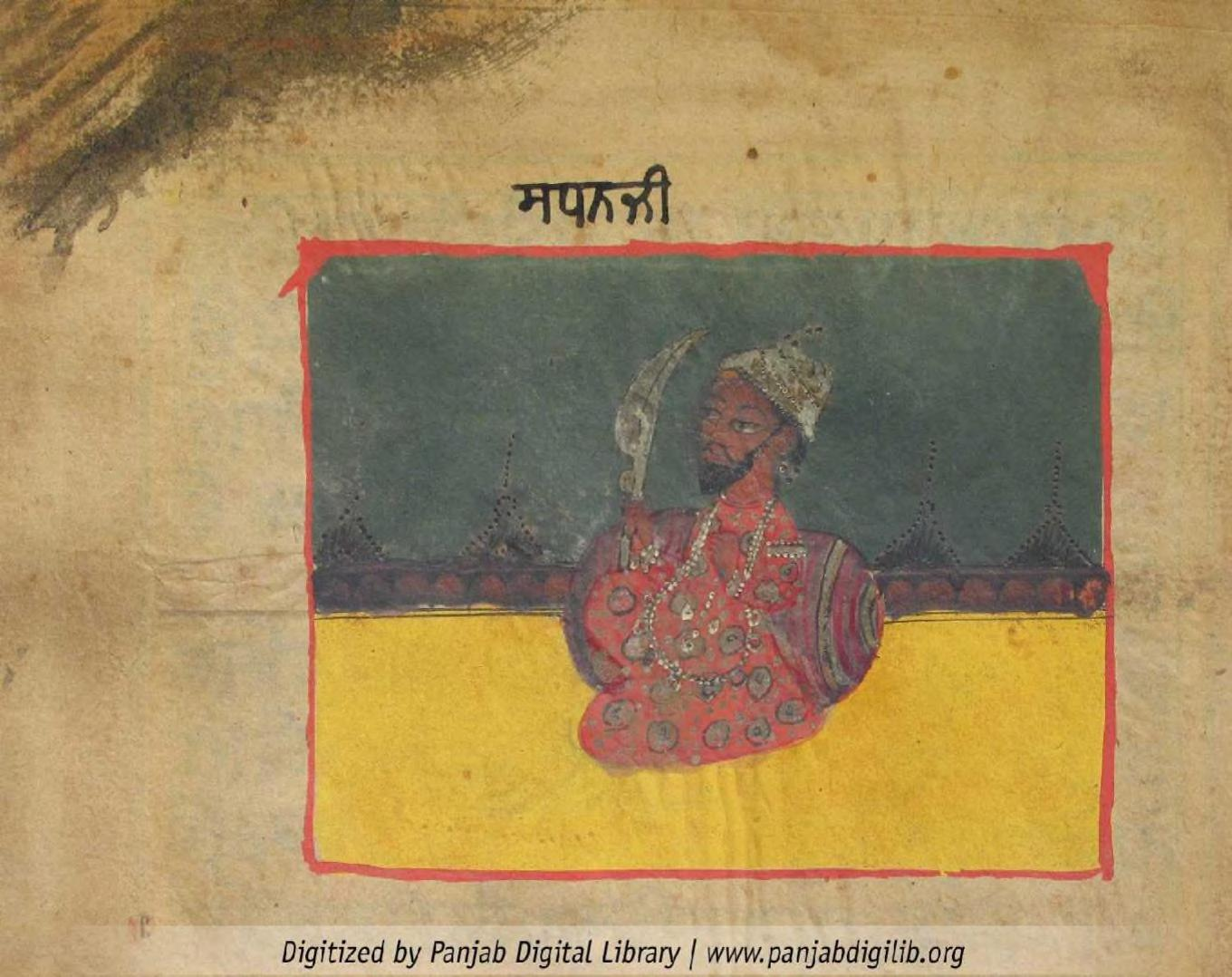
- Painting of Bhagat Sadhana, from a folio within an illustrated manuscript of the Prem Ambodh Pothi
- Born: 1180; Sehwan Sharif, Soomra dynasty (present-day Hyderabad, Sindh, Pakistan)
- Died: Unknown; Sirhind, Punjab, Delhi Sultanate (present-day Punjab, India)
- Occupation: Butcher
- Known for: 1 verse in Guru Granth Sahib.

Bhagat Sadhna, also called Sadhna Qasai, was a north Indian poet, saint, mystic and one of the devotees whose hymn was incorporated in Guru Granth Sahib. Venerated in the region of Punjab, among Sikhs and Ravidassias, his devotional hymn is widely quoted by most preachers. His one hymn is present in Adi Granth Sahib, in Raga Bilaval.

The followers of Bhagat Sadhna are called Sadhna Panthis. His only memorial is a mosque at Sirhind, where he died.

== Life history ==
=== Early life ===
Sadhna was born in 1180 AD in Sehwan Sharif in Hyderabad, Sindh, Soomra kingdom in a Muslim family. As his ancestors were butchers by profession, he continued the family profession of slaughtering goats (Dhabihah) and selling meat. It is said that there were shady trees and drinking water facility available near his shop. Due to this, in addition to customers, travelers, saints, and even rogues used to take rest on passing. Sadhna was very interested in spirituality from his adolescence and as a result, he used to have spiritual discussions with such saints who stopped near his shop.

=== Shaligram desecration ===
Sadhna got shaligram shilas and used them as weights in his profession. Sadhna annoyed Vaishnav sadhus and pandits with this act. On one side, he was of lower profession and caste, and on the other, he was belittling their idol worship by using idol in the flesh of animals, which is considered as sin by the Pundits. Those religious scholars always argued and debated with him, in which Sadhna always outwitted them.

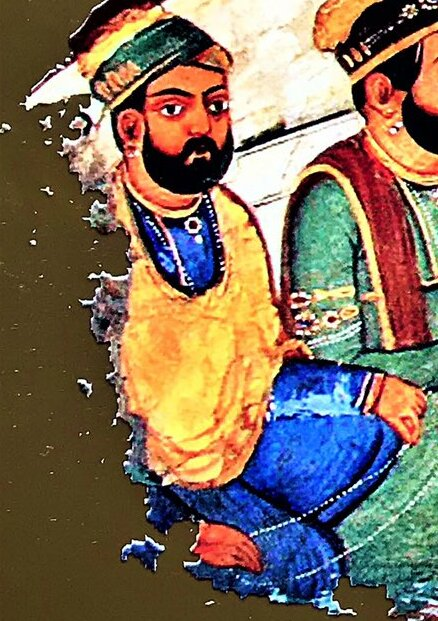
Detail of Bhagat Sadhana from a mural at Gurdwara Baba Atal in Amritsar, circa 19th century

It is recorded that one of vaishnav saint took shaligram stones with him. Sadhna had no issues with this and did not object. Vaishnav saint continued worshipping shaligram but got no internal pleasure and wisdom, as he had seen in state, behavior and thoughts of Sadhna. With dashing hopes he returned Shaligram Stones, the weights of Sadhna back. Sadhna preached that "Shaligrams Stones" are not god as these are lifeless stones, and can not give any wisdom to a living being. His spiritual quest led him to renounce the life of a householder. He left Sehvan and roamed about the country preaching the love of God.

=== Dispute with a man's lusty wife ===
This historical account is from the time when Sadhna was young and good looking with a strong body. During his travels in North India, his looks pleased a young married lady, who wanted to have sex with him. When she asked Sadhna, he replied that he could not have sexual relation with anyone out of his marriage. She thought Sadhna might be fearing her husband. Without understanding Sadhna thoughts, she killed her husband. Came back to Sadhna and told what she did. Sadhna got shocked and left the area after sermonizing her. The lady felt ashamed, she burnt herself on husband's funeral pyre, so that people continued thinking her to be Sati-Savitri. As per historical resources, Sadhna uttered that No one knows the ways of women, she kills her husband and became a sati, which then became popular as proverb and used by many poets and writers later on.

According to few authors, he went to Punjab after this incident.

Another view existed that the man's wife complained to local administration that Sadhna raped her. Sadhna was arrested and the magistrate sentenced Bhagat Sadhna to have his hands cut off. After the punishment was carried out, Bhagat Sadhna was discharged. He set out without a frown on his forehead notwithstanding his barbarous mutilation. Bhagat Sadhna's devotions proved so successful that The Divine blessed him with new hands which sprouted from his body.

=== Death ===
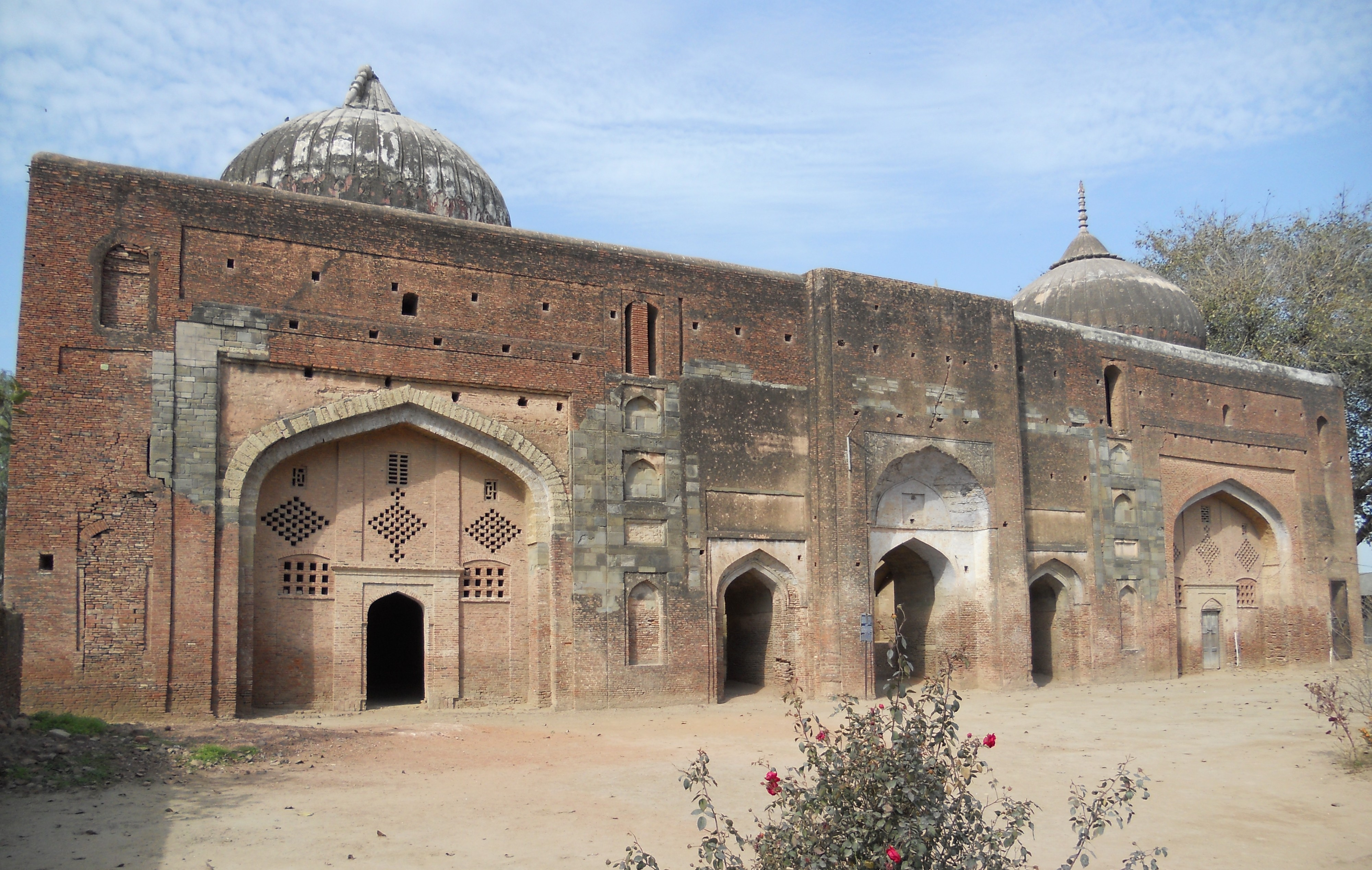
Mosque of Sadhna Qasai, Sirhind

It is believed that Bhagat Sadhna preached in Uttar Pradesh, Rajasthan and Punjab areas. Bhagat Sadhana spent his last day of life at Sirhind preaching his philosophy. At Sirhind, he died, where a mosque was built in his memory and preserved by the Government of Punjab. The paintings in the mosque represent the 'T' art form. The mosque is made up of Sirhindi bricks and is situated in the northwestern part of town Sirhind near Level Crossing, district Fatehgarh Sahib, Punjab.

== Among Ravidasis ==
Ravidasis acknowledge Satgur Sadhna and preach his teaching and thought, as Guru Ravidas in his devotional hymn acknowledge and admire Satgur Sadhna as great devotee among Kabir, Sain, Namdev: Initially the Ravidassia revered the Guru Granth Sahib of the Sikhs, which was the only repository of Ravidass' devotional poetry. However, following their schism from mainstream Sikhs, the Ravidassi compiled their own holy book of Ravidass' teachings, the Amritbani Guru Ravidass Ji, and many Ravidassia temples now use this book in place of the Guru Granth Sahib. But they have not inserted Bhagat Sadhna Vani in it. But Dera Sach Khand Ballan of Jallandhar, Punjab on 30 January 2010 at the 633rd birth anniversary of Ravidass announced the objectives of Ravidassia religion as to propagate the bani and teachings of Ravidas, Balmiki, Namdev, Kabir, Trilochan, Sain and Sadhna.
