= Jammu and Kashmir lithium reserves =

Lithium reserves of Jammu and Kashmir

On 13 February 2023, the Government of India's Ministry of Mines announced that the Geological Survey of India had discovered 5.9 million tonnes inferred lithium resources (G3), in the Himalayan foothills at Salal-Haimana, Reasi in the near vicinity of Bhimgarh castle, built by legendary Indian general Zorawar Singh as his residence. The single finding alone ranked it at the time as 7th largest known reserve in the world. The deposits are in clay, as opposed to hard rock or brine, where commercial extraction has as of yet not been proven.

== Stalled Auction ==
On 2 May 2023, Ministry of Mines secretary Vivek Bharadwaj announced that an auction to assign mining rights was planned on priority basis by December 2023. Former minister and JKNPP president Harsh Dev Singh, challenged the legal premise, upon which the federal government planned to assign mineral rights valued at US$500 billion (half a trillion dollars). On 29 May 2023, Harsh Dev, alongside Ankit Love, in a televised press conference stated that in accordance to Mines and Minerals (Development and Regulation) Act 1957, only a federated state or union territory government had the lawful right to hold auctions and assign mining concessions for minerals found on land. Regrettably, Jammu and Kashmir had no democratically elected state legislature, which had been dismissed by decree under prime minister Modi, imposing president's rule, mobile internet ban and a martial curfew on Jammu and Kashmir in July 2019.

The JKNPP leaders accused the Indian government of attempting an autocratic theft of mineral resources belonging to the people of Jammu and Kashmir. They demanded that any auction for the lithium be delayed till after democratic elections were held in the state, which the central government had unconstitutionally delayed for over 3 years. On 13 May, JKNPP leaders had filed a plea in the Supreme Court of India against the Election Commission of India, to restore the democratic process, and previously numerous high profile elected officials had been placed under house arrest at the time, including former minister Harsh Dev, who was detained by the police at his residence for over 2 months.

Following the campaign by JKNPP, in December 2023, the first attempt to auction Jammu and Kashmir lithium failed. As the auction only received two bids, as per legislation a minimum of three bids is required for the auction to be considered valid.

In March 2024 the Election Commission of India, suddenly froze the name and symbol of the Panthers Party, prior to the April 2024 Indian general election. Thereby preventing the Panthers from using their 4 decade old bicycle symbol by which people in the remote mountain villages recognise the party on ballots in the Udhampur Lok Sabha constituency, adjacent to the lithium find, which the party had previously won in 1988.

In July 2024 a second attempt by the central Indian government of auction Jammu and Kashmir's lithium failed to receive any bids.

== Security Concerns ==
The BJP central government in order to address the 77 years of Kashmir conflict and insurgency in Jammu and Kashmir, which was resultant in over 100,000 war orphans, in August 2019 had passed the Jammu and Kashmir Reorganisation Act 2019, which revoked Article 370 that granted a special autonomous status and constitution to Jammu and Kashmir.

The central Indian government had imposed a strict martial curfew on Kashmir, including the suspension of internet services during the 2019–2021 Jammu and Kashmir lockdown. After dismissing the elected state government, Election Commission of India redrew the electoral map and in a process of delimitation changed the constituency boundaries and regulations. Lithium rich Reasi district was moved out of Udhampur parliamentary constituency which was won by JKNPP founder Bhim Singh prior, the great grandson of General Zorawar Singh. Further, Harsh Dev Singh was barred from being able to stand election again in the near by Ramnagar constituency, where he had previously been elected as MLA for 18 years continuously, as it had been reserved for candidates from lower caste backgrounds.

Husband and wife pair Bhim Singh and Jay Mala who were founders of the JKNPP and seminal advocates of the Supreme Court of India, died suddenly and in mysterious circumstances prior to the attempted lithium auction. Their only child, Ankit Love was blacklisted from entering India in order to attend his mother's funeral. After days of drama in the national news, Ankit Love had the ban uplifted by the government, and arrived from London to Jammu, to authorise a post-mortem on the body on 5 May 2023 at Government Medical College Jammu, and a police investigation opened into Jay Mala’s alleged murder. The post-mortem results were released to police on 16 August 2023, however unconventionally the police refused to declassify the results of the post-mortem with the bereaved family members, despite protests demanding such by the JKNPP, the political party founded by Jay Mala.

On 19 February 2023, a couple months prior to her death, the government revoked Jay Mala's secure accommodation and Z-security cover that had been allocated to her husband to reside for over 20 years. On 1 March 2023, less than a month prior to her death, Jay Mala was published in the news stating that she felt that there was a plot to assassinate her, after she had publicly blamed government agents ultimately being behind her husband's death.

On 19 July 2023, at the Senior Superintendent of Police’s office in Jammu, hundreds of Panthers Party protesters led by former cabinet minister Harsh Dev Singh demanded arrest of those accused of assassinating Jay Mala, as well as stealing money from her accounts and burning down a property belonging to her husband. Love has accused agents of the BJP of assassinating his mother. Love later contested a string of UK parliamentary by-elections including the February 2024 Wellingborough by-election in order to raise international awareness of his mother's non-disclosed post-mortem report.

On 16 August 2024, the Election Commission of India finally announced that Jammu and Kashmir Legislative Assembly Elections will be held, by order of the Supreme Court of India following a plea by the Panthers Party, and after a gap of 10 years, from mid September 2024.
