= Balwant Singh Mankotia =

Indian politician

President of Jammu and Kashmir National Panthers Party
- In office 2010–2021

Member of the Jammu and Kashmir Legislative Assembly
- Incumbent
- Assumed office 2024
- Preceded by: Dina Nath
- Constituency: Chenani
- In office 2002–2014
- Preceded by: Shiv Charan Gupta
- Succeeded by: Pawan Kumar Gupta
- Constituency: Udhampur

Personal details
- Born: Udhampur, Jammu and Kashmir
- Party: Bharatiya Janata Party (2022–Present)
- Other political affiliations: Jammu and Kashmir National Panthers Party (1989–2021)
- Relations: Bhim Singh (uncle); Jay Mala (aunt-in-law); Harsh Dev Singh (cousin); Ankit Love (cousin); Dogra dynasty
- Parent(s): Sh.Mast Ram Mankotia and Surju Devi
- Education: University of Jammu

Balwant‌ Singh‌ Mankotia is an Indian politician and the former President of the Jammu and Kashmir National Panthers Party. He has been three times elected member of the Jammu and Kashmir Legislative Assembly, holding office for over 12 years. He is a leading campaigner for secular values against the terrorist insurgency in Jammu and Kashmir. On 29 September 2022, he joined Bhartiya Janata Party. He won the 2024 elections from Chenani Assembly constituency, a seat previously held by his uncle Bhim Singh, and defeating his cousin Harsh Dev Singh by a margin 15,611 votes.

== Early life ==
His parents are sh. Mast ram Mankotia and Surju Devi. His father, Sh. Mast Ram Mankotia was an Indian military commander in Operation Polo 1948, that ousted Nizam (King) Osman Ali Khan and led to the annexation of Hyderabad to India.

He graduated with a BSc from Jammu University in 1992.

== Career ==
=== Member of government, 2002 ===
He won his first election in 2002 from Udhampur, and was a part of the coalition government in the Jammu and Kashmir Legislative Assembly, with the PDP and Congress Party.

In 2002, Balwant Singh was the first MLA to give oath in the Dogri language in the name of Vaishno Devi, a trend that was adopted by other Hindu MLAs in Jammu and Kashmir.

=== Protest leader in opposition, 2008 ===
After he retained his seat in the 2008 Jammu and Kashmir general elections, Balwant was a vocal member of the opposition, and campaigned to end illiteracy in the state.

Balwant Singh led several protests in the assembly house against Pakistan, then chief minister Omar Abdullah and demanded that the word secular be inserted into the Constitution of Jammu and Kashmir, to match the Constitution of India.

His protests in the assembly house included leading walkouts and throwing a microphone while standing on tables in the assembly house.

=== President of Panthers Party & OIC-UN issue, 2010 ===
In 2010, Balwant Singh became the President of the Panthers Party, and led a large demonstration in front of the UN peacekeeping force base in Jammu. While burning an effigy of the Organisation of Islamic Cooperation (OIC), Balwant demanded that the United Nations secretary-general terminate recognition of the OIC, from the UN's list of recognised groups. He alleged that the OIC, akin to Pakistan's ISI, was supporting terrorist groups in Jammu and Kashmir.

=== Protests as Opposition in Legislative Assembly, 2014 ===
On 24 August 2014 Speaker of the House, Mubarak Gul ordered security guards to forcibly evict Balwant Singh from the assembly when he disturbed proceedings against a bill by Omar Abdullah that had urged India to resume dialogue with Pakistan, instead Balwant wearing a black bandana hawkishly demanded that the assembly condemn ceasefire violations by Pakistan, claiming they were leading to deaths of innocent villagers. He was then forcefully ejected from the legislative assembly by the security marshals and suspended. After disturbing the proceeding he demanded on television that Speaker Mubarak Gal, have the assembly unanimously adopt a resolution against Pakistan, for its ceasefire violations in the Kashmir conflict.

=== Jammu and Kashmir floods, 2014 ===
He campaigned for the October 2014 Jammu and Kashmir floods, to be escalated to status of National Emergency in India to ensure that the effected residents would be compensated.

=== House arrest, 2019 ===
Following Revocation of the special status of Jammu and Kashmir in August 2019, Balwant Singh Mankotia was put under house arrest for over two months.

== Electoral performance ==
Election	Constituency	Party	Result	Votes %	Opposition Candidate	Opposition Party	Opposition vote %	Ref
2024	Chenani	BJP	Won	56.41%	Harsh Dev Singh	JKNPP	38.06%	
2014	Udhampur	JKNPP	Lost	25.36%	Pawan Kumar Gupta	Independent	42.57%	
2008	Udhampur	JKNPP	Won	35.49%	Pawan Kumar Gupta	BJP	31.61%	
2002	Udhampur	JKNPP	Won	40.39%	Pawan Kumar Gupta	BJP	24.10%	
1996	Udhampur	JKNPP	Lost	1.76%	Shiv Charan Gupta	BJP	57.83%	

== Personal life ==
His uncle Bhim Singh, was founder of the Panthers Party and his cousin Harsh Dev Singh is its chairman. His cousin Ankit Love is the leader of the One Love Party in Great Britain.
