= Jammu and Kashmir National Panthers Party =

- Abbreviation: JKNPP
- Leader: Ankit Love
- President: Harsh Dev Singh
- Founder: Bhim Singh and Jay Mala
- Founded: 23 March 1982 (44 years ago)
- Headquarters: 17 VP House, Rafi Marg, New Delhi-110001
- Newspaper: Voice of Millions
- Student wing: National Panthers Student Union
- Youth wing: Young Panthers
- Women's wing: Women Panthers
- Labour wing: Panthers Trade Union
- Peasant's wing: Farmers Panthers Union
- Ideology: Democracy; Anti-corruption; Secularism; Women's rights
- ECI status: State Party
- Alliance: Indian National Developmental Inclusive Alliance (2023–2024)
- Seats in District Development Council: 2 / 280
- Seats in Jammu and Kashmir Legislative Assembly: 0 / 90

Election symbol
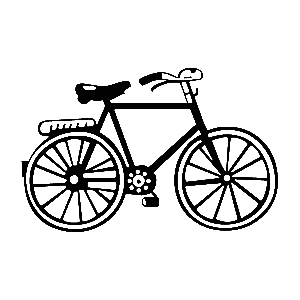

Website
- jknationalpanthersparty.com

The Jammu & Kashmir National Panthers Party was a socialist and secular state political party in the state of Jammu and Kashmir, India. The party was founded on March 23, 1982 by husband and wife Prof. Bhim Singh and Jay Mala, Its aim is to "demolish corruption, communalism, criminalization, drug menace" and to establish a real democracy through ultimate revolution. Panthers Party has maintained power at assembly and the local level for over four decades in its stronghold within the mountainous Udhampur constituency, where in 2002 it won all seats in the Udhampur district, and in 2024 despite failing to win any seats in the assembly, Panthers party placed second in every seat it contested as member of the winning INDIA alliance. In the vicinity of the Udhampur region 5.9 million tonnes of Jammu and Kashmir lithium reserves, the 7th largest known reserve in the world, with an estimated value of $500 billion, was discovered in February 2023.

Panthers Party had campaigned for over three decades for the abolition of Article 370 and Article 35A, demanding that the special status of the State of Jammu and Kashmir be revoked, and for it to be fully assimilated into the Republic of India. These demands were finally met by a presidential order in August 2019 that revoked Jammu and Kashmir's special status. Panthers Party campaigns for a further division of the Union Territory of Jammu and Kashmir, with the recognition of Hindu-majority Jammu Division as a new and separate state of India.

In 2017, Ankit Love, the son of Bhim Singh and Jay Mala, announced his candidacy for Prime Minister of India for the 2019 Indian general election. He became the party's leader on 28 May 2017. On 23 June 2021, Panthers Party President Prof. Bhim Singh was reported in the media as a potential candidate for the 2022 Indian vice presidential election, as recommended for nomination by Ankit Love, just prior to meeting Prime Minister Modi at his residence to discuss the insurgency in Jammu and Kashmir.

In 1996, the party was notable in moving the Supreme Court and the Election Commission to return the democratic process to militancy-torn Jammu and Kashmir, when elections were held again in the state after a nine-year hiatus.

The party formed a part of the coalition government of Jammu & Kashmir along with the Congress and PDP after the 2002 Jammu & Kashmir elections, winning all the seats in the Udhampur district, with Harsh Dev Singh serving as education minister in the cabinet, and Yash Paul Kundal as the minister of animal and sheep husbandry.

The party is a strong proponent of secular values in Jammu & Kashmir and across the region plagued by the terrorist insurgency in Jammu and Kashmir. As a strong advocate of women's rights the Panthers Party women's wing works to protect women from domestic abuse in Jammu and Kashmir and female foeticide. The Women Panthers have called for a 33% reservation of seats for women in the Jammu and Kashmir Legislative Assembly.

Prof. Bhim Singh who is locally known as Sher-e-Jammu (Lion of Jammu) is the party's Chief Patron and served as the Panthers Party chairman for 30 years till 2012, when his nephew Harsh Dev Singh became Chairman. Balwant Singh Mankotia has served as party's state president since 2010.

The Panthers Party has been a long-time advocate of a sovereign statehood for Palestine. It strongly condemned Israel in reaction to the 2010 Gaza flotilla raid that left nine humanitarian aid workers dead, and called on the Indian central government to support Palestinians inside and outside the UN. In 2014, Panthers Party activists burned an effigy of Israeli prime minister Benjamin Netanyahu at protests held in New Delhi, calling for UN intervention under Chapter VII, and terming Israel's actions in Gaza as "genocide."

By December 2015, the Panthers Party's membership drive had reached a target of 100,000 members.

Panthers Party has fielded candidates in other Indian states, including Delhi in 2015, Uttarakhand in 2012, and in 2007 contested all MLA seats in Himachal Pradesh. In 2017, Panthers Party contested elections in Punjab, and Uttar Pradesh, and reconstituted its branch in Rajasthan, headed by Ashok Bapna. Panthers Party branch in the south Indian state of Tamil Nadu, is led by state president Naresh Ambedkar.

== 1982-2022 Bhim Singh Era ==
=== Founding ===
The party was founded by Bhim Singh in 1982 as a split from the Indian National Congress. At the time, Bhim Singh was a member of the Jammu and Kashmir Legislative Assembly with the Congress party. Bhim Singh had differences with the Congress party's alliance with the National Conference party of Sheikh Abdullah. In particular, the Panther's Party was founded in reaction to Sheikh Abdullah's Resettlement Act.

The manifesto of the party focused on secular, nationalist and democratic principles, while seeking to respect the diversity of cultures and religions in the state including Ladakh, Jammu and Kashmir.

A month after its formation, in April 1982, the name of the party was questioned in the Jammu and Kashmir Legislative Assembly by Chief Minister, Sheikh Abdullah who had asked "Bhim Singh you were all right as a human being. Why you chose to be an animal?" Prof. Bhim Singh had then responded that "the people of State were terrorized by a big animal, known as Sher-e-Kashmir (Lion of Kashmir was Abdullah's nickname). They needed safety and protection from that lion. It was necessary to become an animal (Panther) to resist the lion."

=== J&K general elections, 1983 ===
On its formation in the 1983 Jammu and Kashmir Legislative Assembly elections the Panther's Party contested 50 seats in Jammu and Kashmir. The Panthers Party won only one seat, that of party founder Bhim Singh. He retained his seat with 7,690 votes (34.37%), a slender margin of 262 votes over his Congress Party rival. In reaction to his split from Congress, its ruling Nehru-Gandhi dynasty, had given Bhim Singh stiff opposition in his constituency of Chenani-Ghordi.

In the neighbouring constituency of Udhampur, Panthers Party co-founder Jay Mala, placed third against sixteen other male candidates with 3,768 votes (13.75%), and polled the second most votes amongst all women candidates in the 1983 J&K general elections. She was one of only seven female candidates that contested out of a total 512 candidates.

=== Indian general elections, 1984 ===
Bhim Singh stood in the 1984 general elections for Indian parliament, from the Udhampur constituency. He came second, to the Indian National Congress from which he had recently split to form the Panthers Party. He received 95,149 votes (26.24%).

=== Bhim Singh, MLA v. State of Jammu and Kashmir, 1985 ===
On 17 August 1985 Bhim Singh was suspended from the opening of the budget session of the Jammu and Kashmir Legislative Assembly that was scheduled for 11 September. He subsequently challenged the suspension in the Jammu and Kashmir High Court. After his suspension was stayed by High Court on 9 September, Bhim Singh was illegally detained and arrested by the police en route to Srinagar. After attempts to locate him proved futile his wife and advocate Jay Mala then moved the court to locate Bhim Singh. The court ruled that there "certainly was a gross violation of Shri Bhim Singh's constitutional rights" and condemned the "authoritarian acts of the police." The judges stated that they were in no doubt that the top levels of the Government of Jammu and Kashmir where ultimately responsible.

The Supreme Court in a landmark judgement that impacted tort law in India, awarded Bhim Singh a compensation of fifty thousands rupees for his illegal detention and false imprisonment by the police. Bhim Singh had left jail with a fractured leg and claimed during his false imprisonment the police and state agencies had made an attempt on his life.

=== J&K general elections, 1987 ===
Panthers Party in the 1987 J&K general elections, contested 21 out of 76 seats for the legislative assembly. They lost in all constituencies, and received a total of 46,043 votes (6.85%) across the seats they contested.

Thakur Dass Chantora was runner-up from Chenani-Ghordi, with 10,462 votes (36.99%). Sat Pal was runner-up from Marh, with 11,818 votes (35.97%). Girdhari Lal was runner-up from Ramnagar, with 6,807 votes (27.95%). Bhim Singh came in third from Reasi, with 5,534 votes (16.73%).

Bhim Singh accused Farooq Abdullah's government of rigging the elections, which led to insurgency in Jammu and Kashmir and the ethnic cleansing of Kashmiri Hindus.

=== Udhampur MP By-Election, 1988 ===
At the conclusion of the count on 19 June 1988, Panthers Party leader, Bhim Singh was announced as the winner of the Udhampur by-election by 32,000 votes. However, the Union Home Minister of India, Buta Singh had dispatched Dr. Bhalla, Secretary of the Election Commission by a Home Ministry aircraft to Jammu. Dr. Bhalla ordered the Returning Officer, S. P. Kazal to refer the count result to the Election Commission of India in New Delhi. On 25 June 1988 Peri Shastri the Chief Election Commissioner in New Delhi declared the Congress Party candidate Mohd. Ayub Khan instead as the winner by 2,376 votes. The Returning Officer was later found to have committed suicide with no known motive.

Bhim Singh filed a review petition against the order of the Election Commission of India, stating the declared result was rigged at the instance of Rajiv Gandhi and Farooq Abdullah, leaders of the ruling coalition parties. Atal Behari Vajpayee joined Bhim Singh on hunger strike in front of the Election Commission offices in protest to the vote rigging. The Jammu and Kashmir High Court ruled in favour of Bhim Singh, however when Justice K. K. Gupta delivered the judgement four years later on 15 October 1992, the relevant session of parliament stood dissolved already.

Bhim Singh later wrote in his book, Murder of Democracy in Jammu and Kashmir, that he had intervened to pacify a crowd of his supporters at the time, despite it costing him the result. As he feared an outbreak of violence at the count venue could have resulted in the deaths of hundreds of civilians, by the heavily armed police present there, due to an escalation of the insurgency in Jammu and Kashmir.

=== Indian general elections, 1989 & 1991 ===
With his court battle still ensuing against the Election Commission over the rigging of the previous election, Bhim Singh contested again for the Panthers Party, from Udhampur in the 1989 Indian general elections. He polled fourth, with 22,625 votes (7.23%).

In the 1991 Indian general elections, Panthers Party contested two seats from National Capital Territory of Delhi, in protest to the 1991 Hawala scandal, that broke out after an arrest of Kashmiri militants revealed evidence of money corruption by senior Indian politicians, including leader of the opposition, L. K. Advani.

Bhim Singh contested against BJP leader, L. K. Advani in New Delhi. He came sixth out of 63 candidates, with 396 votes (0.18%). Ishwar Chand contested for the Panthers Party from South Delhi, against the BJP's Madan Lal Khurana. Chand came 26th out of 74 candidates with 191 votes (0.05%).

=== Indian general elections, 1996 ===
The Panthers Party in the 1996 Indian general election contested five out of the six parliamentary seats in Jammu and Kashmir. The Panthers Party candidates were Dil Jeet Singh in Baramulla, Mohammad Akbar in Srinagar, Mohamad Yousf Ganai in Anantnag, Navin Baksi in Jammu, and Bhim Singh in Udhampur.

Collectively the Panthers Party received a total of 99,599 votes (5.05%) across the seats contested.

=== J&K general elections, 1996 ===
Panthers Party defeated the Election Commission in the Supreme Court of India, forcing it to hold elections in Jammu and Kashmir by order of chief justice J. S. Verma. Democratic elections had not been held for nine years, with the state placed under the Indian President's rule, due to a break down in law and order resultant from the terrorist insurgency.

Panthers Party contested 45 out of 87 seats in the 1996 J&K general election. It received a total of 55,885 votes (4.33%) across the seats it contested. Harsh Dev Singh won from Ramnagar with 9,049 votes (24.56%).

=== Indian general elections, 1998 & 1999 ===
Panthers Party in the 1998 Indian general elections contested eight seats in Maharashtra, Uttar Pradesh, Rajasthan, Haryana and Jammu and Kashmir. The party received a total of 24,638 votes (0.59%) across the seats they contested.

In the 1999 Indian general elections held a few months after the Kargil war, the party contested from four constituencies in Uttar Pradesh and Jammu and Kashmir, and received a total of 15,888 votes (1.38%) across the seats they contested.

=== Jammu and Kashmir state assembly 2002-2008 ===
In the 2002 Jammu and Kashmir assembly elections, Panthers Party stood candidates in 36 out of 87 seats, gaining a total of 101,830 votes (7.24%) across the seats they contested. The party won in four constituencies, which included all three seats in the Udhampur district.

Udhampur was won by Balwant Singh with 24,679 votes (40.39%). Chenani was won by SH Faquir Nath with 17,118 votes (37.42%) and Ramnagar by Harsh Dev Singh 29,914 votes (50.40%). Samba was won by Yash Paul Kundal with 11,079 votes (25.31%).

Harsh Dev Singh served as the education minister in the coalition government, under his tenure as minister, English was made a compulsory language from first grade in state schools. Yash Paul became the minister of animal and sheep husbandry. Panthers Party leader, Bhim Singh became member of the Jammu and Kashmir Legislative Council. In 2007, Bhim Singh withdrew support to the Congress Party lead coalition, citing differences with the Peoples Democratic Party. The government fell soon after when the PDP itself withdrew their support from the Congress Party during the Amarnath land transfer controversy, placing the state under direct rule of the Indian central government for a few month prior to the Jammu and Kashmir state assembly elections, 2008.

=== Indian general elections, 2004 ===
In the 2004 Indian general elections, the Panthers Party fielded seven candidates from Jammu and Kashmir, Punjab and Delhi. Ravinder Kumar Jassi stood for the party in Ludhiana, Ved Prakash in New Delhi, R. Ravicandran in South Delhi, Syed Mohammed Rafiq Shah in Baramulla, Bashir Ahmad in Srinagar, Kuldeep Singh in Jammu, and Bhim Singh in Udhampur.

The party received 70,078 votes (2.00%), across the seats contested.

=== Protests as opposition in state assembly 2008-2014 ===
In the 2008 J&K general elections, Panthers Party contested 73 out of 87 seats, and received a total of 131,944 votes (3.33%). They retained three seats in the legislative assembly, and formed part of a fragmented opposition along with the BJP and PDP.

While in opposition they led a series of theatrical protests. In March 2013, Balwant Singh climbed onto his seat and hurled his microphone across the assembly house, leading a protest with the BJP. He demanded a resolution against Pakistan who had condemned India's hanging of Parliament attack terrorist Afzal Guru. The month after in April 2013, Balwant joined another opposition disruption in the Jammu and Kashmir assembly condemning the death of Indian prisoner Chamel Singh in a Pakistani jail who had been allegedly tortured before his death.

In May 2013, Panthers Party held another protest in the assembly demanding that chief minister Omar Abdullah resign, claiming his order was responsible for the deaths of five Central Reserve Police Force personnel in Srinagar. Harsh Dev Singh led a walk out protest in October 2013 from the assembly house with the BJP. They had wanted the Ganaie Committee Report scrapped.

Balwant Singh lead protesters in violent clashes with armed police in his constituency of Udhampur on 16 August 2014. They were protesting against what they claimed was discrimination against youth from Jammu in favor of people from the Kashmir valley in regards to employment opportunities with the Railway Police.

On 24 August 2014 Speaker of the House, Mubarak Gul ordered security guards to forcibly evict Balwant Singh from the assembly when he disturbed proceedings against a bill by Omar Abdullah that had urged India to resume dialogue with Pakistan, instead Balwant wearing a black bandana hawkishly demanded that the assembly condemn ceasefire violations by Pakistan, claiming they were leading to deaths of innocent villagers.

A few days later on 28 August, Harsh Dev Singh lead protests disturbing proceedings in the assembly house with placards demanding that the word secular be inserted into the Jammu and Kashmir constitution to bring it to parity with the Constitution of India. In the protest they also claimed that the BJP who had recently come into power in the Indian national government in May 2014 were destroying the secular fabric of the country.

In October 2014, party leader Bhim Singh heavily criticized BJP leader Narendra Modi's visit to Jammu and Kashmir, stating he was not "able to play the role of the prime minister," and on his visit should have first met terrorism effected people as opposed to those effected by the recent 2014 Kashmir floods. In November 2014, he condemned the BJP as a party of "shop keepers" run from Nagpur by Hindu paramilitary group RSS.

Next month in December, the Panthers party lost all their seats in the 2014 Jammu and Kashmir Legislative Assembly elections.

Syed Mohammad Rafiq Shah remained as the sole Panthers Party representative in government until March 2015, as a Member of the Jammu and Kashmir Legislative Council. Earlier in April 2013, Shah had been marshalled out of the upper house after creating a ruckus in protest to discrimination against Urdu, an official state language. During his protest he highlighted news reports that a government official from the Doda district had refused to place signs in the Urdu language.

=== Indian general elections, 2009 ===
The Panthers Party contested ten seats across Rajasthan, Punjab, Haryana, Delhi and Jammu and Kashmir in the 2009 Indian general elections. The party candidates were Mohammad Iqbal Jan in Baramulla, Bhim Singh in Udhampur, Gurinder Singh Sood in Ludhiana, Vijendra Singh in Churu, Shiv Kumar in Alwar, Om Prakash in Tonk–Sawai Madhopur, Gurdan Singh in Jodhpur, Harsh Malhotra in Delhi, Raj Kumar Nagar in Sirsa, and Ramesh Kumar in Gurgaon.

The Panthers Party received a total of 87,502 votes across the ten seats, losing each election.

=== Condemnation of Israel's attack on Gaza flotilla, 2010 ===
The Panthers Party strongly condemned Israel's actions in the Gaza flotilla raid, during which nine activists carrying humanitarian aid for Palestine were killed by Israeli armed forces. Balwant Singh Mankotia, Panthers state president accused Israel of religious suppression at the time, as residents of Ramallah, Anata, Hebron and Jericho were denied from offering prayers at Al-Aqsa. Balwant Singh in reaction to the incident said "Israel should pullout its troops from Palestine and lift all barricades," as he believed that "the settlement of Jewish community in Occupied Palestine is a grave threat to international peace and security."

The party at the time had called on the Indian central government to support the sovereign statehood of Palestine both in and outside the UN, stating that the USA and Israel were in violation of UN Resolution 181.

=== Life sentence for Iqbal Jan overturned, 2012 ===
Iqbal Jan who was candidate for parliament for Baramulla constituency for Panthers Party in May 2009, was given a life sentence after being convicted for waging war against the country in September 2009. On 28 February 2012, Delhi High Court overturned the judgment and called for immediate release of Jan from Tihar prison, who had been represented by Panthers Party founder Bhim Singh as his advocate.

=== Indian general elections, 2014 ===
In the 2014 Indian general elections, Panthers Party fielded 13 candidates in Delhi, Punjab, Bihar, and Jammu and Kashmir. Syed Mohammed Rafiq Shah in Baramulla, Mohammad Maqbool Malik in Srinagar, Syed Abid Ahmad Shah in Anantnag, Bhim Singh in Udhampur, Hari Chand Jalmeria in Jammu, Kishan Kumar Sharma in Ludhiana, Lakhvir Singh in Fatehgarh Sahib, Shaminder Singh in Bathinda, Mohammad Hasnan Khan in North East Delhi, Jai Ram Lal in East Delhi, Sunita Chaudhary in New Delhi, Mohan Kanuga in South Delhi, Moqim Ansari in Purvi Champaran.

They received a total of 57,103 votes across the 13 seats. They lost each election, and saved five deposits.

=== J&K general elections, 2014 ===
In the 2014 Jammu and Kashmir general elections, the Panthers Party contested 60 out of 87 seats. They lost all their three MLA seats, and 56 deposits polling a total of 95,941 votes (1.99%). It was the first time in 18 years that the Panthers Party had no elected representative in the J&K legislative assembly.

=== Demand for President's Rule 2016 ===
In reaction to the escalating violence and blindings from anti-riot pellet guns in the valley during the 2016 Kashmir Unrest, the Panthers Party through the Supreme Court of India had attempted to dissolve the government by imposition of Governor's rule. On 22 August, while the court denied the party's attempt, it ordered the solicitor general to arrange a meeting between the Panthers Party leader, Bhim Singh and Prime Minister Narendra Modi to discuss the issue. During the case Bhim Singh had stated that "pellet guns from Israel are used against the Kashmiris. This is a crime." Three days later, Home Minister of India, Rajnath Singh traveled to Kashmir and met with a three-member delegation of the Panthers Party promising to end the use of pellet guns. On 19 September, Bhim Singh meet Narendra Modi for the first time since the latter had become prime minister. A day after, the Supreme Court asked its Registry to consider listing Bhim Singh's second demand for President's rule for an earlier hearing.

=== Farooq Abdullah Guest of Honor at 39th Panthers Party Anniversary Event 2021 ===
On 23 March 2021, Farooq Abdullah, former Chief Minister of Jammu and Kashmir was the surprise guest of honor and main speaker at the Panthers Party's 39th anniversary event in Jammu's Dogra Hall, and shared the stage with Prof. Bhim Singh and former minister Harsh Dev Singh. Previously, Panthers Party had stood in fierce opposition to Farooq Abdullah, and his father Sheik Abdullah for nearly four decades. Abdullah had been detained under house arrest for 220 days in the previous year, after the Government of India revoked the special status of Jammu and Kashmir, and Prof. Bhim Singh had filed a writ petition in the Supreme Court of India in February 2020, demanding Farooq Abdullah's release, as well as the release of his son Omar Abdullah and 600 other political activists who had been detained for six months. Prof. Bhim Singh aged 79, had also just returned to active leadership when he was elected President of the Panthers Party the month before on 14 February 2021, when his nephew Balwant Singh Mankotia resigned from the post citing family issues.

Prior to being elected President of the Panthers Party, Prof. Bhim Singh was briefly expelled from the Panthers Party by his nephew and party chairman Harsh Dev Singh in Nov 2020, when he had met with Farooq Abdullah at his residence and the rest of the Peoples Alliance for Gupkar Declaration in Srinagar, Kashmir.

At the Panther Party event, Abdullah had commented that the "Congress which is a national level party has become weak", and that the recent division and removal of Jammu and Kashmir's special status was "an attack on our honour." In reference to Prof. Bhim Singh and Harsh Dev Singh, Abdullah hoped that "these lions will stand up to the challenge posed by the divisive forces."

=== Bulgari Hotel London Incident 2021 ===
Following a fight and dispute with a Pakistani businessman in relation to the insurgency in Jammu and Kashmir, Ankit Love was removed by London metropolitan police from the Bulgari Hotel & Residencies, one of the most expensive apartment buildings in the world, where in 2012 an apartment sold for $157 million (INR 1200 crore). Love had been invited to the hotel as a guest by Ariana Ghani, niece of then president of Afghanistan Ashraf Ghani in July 2021, just a month prior to the Fall of Kabul to the Taliban.

=== Aam Admi Party Defection 2022 ===
In 2022, over a hundred Panthers Party members, including three former MLAs and two ex cabinet ministers merged into the newly formed Jammu and Kashmir branch of AAP party. AAP had just recently won the Punjab assembly election. Prof. Bhim Singh had expelled all members who had defected to the AAP, stating their exit thus had no effect.

== 2022-2023 Jay Mala Leadership ==
Panthers Party founder Bhim Singh died in office as President of Panthers Party on 31 May 2022, following which his wife and co-founder Jay Mala took effective full control of Panthers Party as its leader, Chairwoman and de facto president. She nominated Vilakshan Singh working under her authority as an acting interim president until the party's official presidential elections scheduled for 23 March 2023.

=== Lithium Discovery ===
In February 2023, following the discovery of 5.9 tonnes of lithium in Reasi, Jammu, Ankit Love took over as Chief Patron of the Panthers Party, a role previously held by his father Prof. Bhim Singh. Jay Mala commented that Love due to his international perspective was the best person to manage the $500 billion worth of lithium discovered in the Udhampur parliamentary constituency where the Panthers party won the election previously.

Ankit Love stated at the time: "There is more Lithium in Jammu, than oil in Dubai! Almost half a trillion US dollars worth of it. So we must make sure our people will now be the richest in the world. We must have the best infrastructure, libraries, hospitals, art galleries, theatres, sports teams, shopping malls, five star hotel resorts, airports and the creation of a brand new world class Prof. Bhim Singh University which was always my father’s dream, to build the world’s greatest university here.”

=== Eviction by government from secure accommodation ===
On 20 February, Government of Jammu and Kashmir withdrew Jay Mala's secure accommodation by sealing the Panthers party office in Jammu. She subsequently on a TV appearance asked that Lieutenant Governor of Jammu and Kashmir Manoj Sinha, launch a probe into her husband's death. Jay Mala at the time had stated "there was a certain plot to assassinate her too, and that she may not survive for much longer".

=== Harsh Dev Singh Rejoins Panthers Party ===
On 16 Feb 2023, Harsh Dev Singh resigned as Chairman of J&K Aam Aadmi Party, and rejoined Panthers Party in the presence of Jay Mala.

==== Harsh Dev elected state President ====
Supported by Jay Mala, former education minister Harsh Dev Singh was elected state president of Panthers party by the working committee on 4 April 2023.

== 2023- Post-Founders ==
=== Jay Mala Death ===
Jay Mala died 26 April 2023, at age 64, after fighting for her life on a ventilator at Government Medical College Jammu. Her dead body was kept in the mortuary for ten days amidst a power struggle for control of the party between her late husband Bhim Singh's nephews ex minister Harsh Dev Singh and advocate Vilakshan Singh.

Following which, her son Ankit Love, who was in London at time for her death, requested a post-mortem on Jay Mala's body, which was conducted on 5 May 2023. Mala had previously stated that she feared there was a plot to assassinate her.

Love expelled Vilakshan Singh from primary membership of the Panther Party on 17 May 2023. Jay Mala had died after suffering a fatal injury to her head while visiting the home of Vilakshan Singh's sister.

=== Harsh Dev Singh presidency 2023 ===
Harsh Dev Singh was nominated by former Panthers party president Bansi Lal Sharma, and on 3 April 2023 elected by majority vote of the party's working committee as president, for a term of 3 years.

==== Supreme Court petition for holding of delayed Assembly elections ====
On 25 May, Harsh Dev Singh filed a petition with the Supreme Court of India, seeking to move the Election Commission to hold elections in J&K as soon as possible, that not been conducted for 9 years The assembly stood dissolved for four years, with no elected representation of the people at the executive level.

==== J&K lithium mining rights auction ====
On 29 May, JKNPP president Harsh Dev Singh, addressing a press conference in Jammu, stated "People of J&K have exclusive right over lithium reserves.", and that the central government's announcement to auction the lithium by December, was interfering with matters that under the Mines and Minerals (Development and Regulation) Act 1957 fall within the lawful domain of state and union territory governments. He stated the central government was attempting usurp lithium rights of people of Jammu and Kashmir.

==== Protest leader and contender for coalition Chief Minister ====
With the serious possibility of a coalition government in Jammu and Kashmir, former Minister of Education Harsh Dev Singh rose to prominence and as a potential candidate for Chief Minister after being falsely arrested while leading a series of protests against corruption in the police, mining, sanitation, pension, education, roads, power and water departments.

=== J&K legislative assembly elections, 2024 ===
In the 2024 Jammu and Kashmir general elections, the Panthers Party contested 4 out of 90 seats. The I.N.D.I.A alliance supported them in one seat. They lost all the seats that they contested and their vote share was reduced to 1.16% of the total votes.

== Members of Legislative Assembly ==
Members of Jammu & Kashmir Legislative Assembly
Year	Assembly	Portrait	MLA	Constituencies	Margin
2008	11th	1	Balwant Singh Mankotia	Udhampur	
2008	11th	2.	Harsh Dev Singh	Ramnagar	
2008	11th	3.	Yash Paul Kundal	Samba	
2002	10th	1.	Balwant Singh Mankotia	Udhampur	
2002	10th	2.	Harsh Dev Singh	Ramnagar	
2002	10th	3.	Yash Paul Kundal	Samba	
2002	10th	4.	Faquir Nath	Chanani	
1996		1.	Harsh Dev Singh	Ramnagar	
