= Harsh Dev Singh =

Indian politician

President of Jammu and Kashmir National Panthers Party
- Incumbent
- Assumed office 4 April 2023
- Preceded by: Jay Mala

Education Minister of Jammu and Kashmir
- In office 2002–2008
- Governor: Srinivas Kumar Sinha
- Succeeded by: Governor's rule

Member of Jammu and Kashmir Legislative Assembly
- In office 1996–2014
- Preceded by: Chandhu Lal
- Succeeded by: Ranbir Singh Pathania
- Constituency: Ramnagar

Chairman of Jammu and Kashmir National Panthers Party
- In office 27 November 2012 – 7 May 2022
- Preceded by: Bhim Singh
- Succeeded by: Jay Mala

Personal details
- Born: Ramnagar, Jammu and Kashmir
- Party: Jammu and Kashmir National Panthers Party (2024–present)
- Other political affiliations: Aam Aadmi Party (2022–2023); Jammu and Kashmir National Panthers Party (1992–2022, 2023–2024)
- Spouse: Manju Singh
- Relations: Bhim Singh (uncle); Jay Mala (aunt-in-law) Ankit Love (cousin); Dogra dynasty
- Children: Er. Bhanu Pratap Singh Advocate Raj Pratap Singh
- Parent: Thakur Das
- Education: University of Jammu

Harsh Dev Singh is an Indian politician and advocate. He was Chairman of the Jammu and Kashmir National Panthers Party from 2012 to 2022. He won three elections serving as MLA for Ramnagar, constituency for 18 continuous years from 1996 till 2014. Under his tenure as the Minister of Education of Jammu and Kashmir from 2002 to 2008, English became a compulsory language from first grade. On April 4, he was elected president of National Panthers Party.

== Early life ==
Harsh Dev Singh won his first Legislative Assembly election in 1996. Harsh Dev Singh graduated from Sainik School Nagrota in 1977. He has done L.L.B (professional) and M.A in English literature from University of Jammu. He has done Advanced Course in "International Humanitarian Law" from Boston in USA. He received the highest honour when he was invited to Harvard University in America which is considered to be the top most University of the world.

== Career ==
=== Member of Jammu and Kashmir Legislative Assembly ===
Harsh Dev Singh has won three elections from the Ramnagar constituency and served as a member of the Jammu and Kashmir Legislative Assembly continuously for 18 years from 1996 till 2014. In his first term he received the Best Legislator Award. In view of his outstanding contributions and for espousing the cause of poor, downtrodden, farmers, unemployed youth, and employees besides various other sections of the society, he was conferred with "Star of Jammu", award by the then Haryana Governor Sh. Babu Parmanand. He was also honoured with "Baba Sahib Bhim Rao Ambedkar Award" by a Jammu based organization.

He is the only politician of JK invited by IMPA, a Govt. of J&K Training Institute, to give Lectures/and conduct orientation programmes on constitution and J&K laws of newly inducted IAS/KAS officers in J&K cadre.

He was appointed as a Resource Person to impart trainings to the newly elected 55 MLAs and MLCs in 2014 by the Mufti Sayeed led State government. He lost in 2024.

=== Minister of Education, 2002 ===
Harsh Dev Singh was sworn in as the minister of education after the 2002 Jammu and Kashmir Legislative Assembly elections. He was the first ever cabinet minister from the Panthers Party.

Under Harsh Dev, English became the compulsory language from first grade in all government schools. In his term as education minister the government opened 22 new degree colleges. Prior to which 32 colleges had been established in a 100 years time. They also opened over 11,000 new schools in the state. He also created history by promoting 22000 employees of Education department within three years.

To deal with teaching staff shortages in remote areas, Harsh Dev moved 2,800 teachers from cities back to their original rural postings.

His performance as Education Minister of J&K was publicly appreciated by then Union Minister for Human Resources Development, Sh. Arjun Singh in a conference in presence of various Education Ministers of different States, He received Best citizen of India Award from a Delhi based international organization. He has also been conferred with 'Glory of India' (Gold Medalist) Award.

He is the only Minister in the history of J&K whose work proficiency and competency was appreciated by the entire 86 MLAs in the legislative Assembly.

=== Chairman of Panthers Party, 2012 ===
Bhim Singh who had been the Chairman of the Panthers Party for 30 years nominated Harsh Dev Singh to the position on 27 November 2012 to coincide with the 65th anniversary of the Instrument of Accession signed between the Maharaja and India. He held the post of chairman for nearly 10 years till 7 May 2022.

=== Protest as Opposition in Legislative Assembly, 2014 ===
On 28 August 2014, Harsh Dev Singh led protests disturbing proceedings in the assembly house with placards demanding that the word secular be inserted into the Jammu and Kashmir constitution to bring it to parity with the Constitution of India. In the protest they also claimed that the BJP who had recently come into power in the Indian national government in May 2014 were destroying the secular fabric of the country.

=== House Arrest, 2019 ===
Following Revocation of the special status of Jammu and Kashmir in August 2019, Harsh Dev Singh was put under house arrest for over two months.

=== Aam Aadmi Party, 2022 ===
Harsh Dev Singh joined Aam Aadmi Party on 7 May 2022 along with other leaders of the Jammu and Kashmir National Panthers Party, including Rajesh Pandgotra provincial president, Gagan Pratap Singh, Purushottam Parihar and Sudesh Dogra. He resigned from AAP on 16 February 2023, and rejoined the Jammu and Kashmir National Panthers Party.

=== President of Panthers Party, 2023 ===
After rejoining Jammu and Kashmir National Panthers Party, he was elected by its working committee as the president on 4 April 2023.

=== Dogra Heritage ===
He has called for the recognition of Dogra heritage and the Dogri language citing the stable governance it once provided the nation under the Maharaja from 1846 to 1947 when the Kashmir conflict based on religious differences broke out in the state.

=== Supreme Court plea to restore J&K Assembly Elections, 2023 ===
On 13 May, Harsh Dev led JKNPP leaders had filed a plea in the Supreme Court of India against the Election Commission of India, to restore the democratic process, and previously numerous high profile elected officials had been placed under house arrest at the time, including former minister Harsh Dev, who was detained by the police at his residence for over 2 months. In December 2023, the Supreme Court directed the Election Commission of India to restore the democratic process by 30 September 2024.

On 16 August 2024, the Election Commission of India finally announced that Jammu and Kashmir Legislative Assembly Elections will be held, by order of the Supreme Court of India following a plea by the Panthers Party, and after a gap of 10 years, from mid September 2024.

=== Jammu and Kashmir Lithium Reserves, 2023 ===
On 2 May 2023, Ministry of Mines secretary Vivek Bharadwaj announced that an auction to assign mining rights was planned on priority basis by December 2023. Former minister and JKNPP president Harsh Dev Singh, challenged the legal premise, upon which the federal government planned to assign mineral rights valued at US$500 billion (half a trillion dollars). On 29 May 2023, Harsh Dev, alongside Ankit Love, in a televised press conference stated that in accordance to Mines and Minerals (Development and Regulation) Act 1957, only a federated state or union territory government had the lawful right to hold auctions and assign mining concessions for minerals found on land. Regrettably, Jammu and Kashmir had no democratically elected state legislature, which had been dismissed by decree under prime minister Modi, imposing president's rule, mobile internet ban and a martial curfew on Jammu and Kashmir in July 2019.

=== Election Symbol Frozen by ECI, 2024 ===
In March 2024 the Election Commission of India, suddenly froze the name and symbol of the Panthers Party, prior to the April 2024 Indian general election. Thereby preventing the Panthers from using their 4 decade old bicycle symbol by which people in the remote mountain villages recognise the party on ballots in the Udhampur Lok Sabha constituency, adjacent to the lithium find, which the party had previously won in 1988.

=== Chenani Assembly Election, 2024 ===
Harsh Dev Singh stood as a candidate from Chenani assembly constituency in the 2024 Jammu and Kashmir Legislative Assembly for the National Panthers Party with the INDIA alliance. He polled 32,379 votes coming second to his cousin Balwant Singh Mankotia who polled 47,990 votes, a former president of the National Panthers Party who had recently defected to the BJP. The two cousins polled over 94% of the votes combined in the seat formerly held by their uncle Prof. Bhim Singh since 1977.

Harsh Dev Singh moved the Jammu and Kashmir High Court alleging corrupt electoral practices. In November 2024, the High Court sent a notice to the Election Commission of India in regards to the plea seeking to nullify the result. In September 2024, Harsh Dev Singh called for an audit of the Electronic Voting Machines (EVMs) used in Chenani. Engineers certified EVMs as non-functional during the review process, to which the authorities rebutted that the issue was a minor clock error. Singh however alleged collusion between the ECI and BJP.

== Personal life ==
His uncle Bhim Singh was founder of the Panthers Party, and his cousin Ankit Love is the leader of the One Love Party in Great Britain.
