= National Integration Council =

Government advisory body in India

- राष्ट्रीय एकता परिषद
- Abbreviation: NIC
- Formation: 1961
- Type: Government advisory body
- Legal status: Active
- Purpose: Address the problems of communalism, casteism and regionalism
- Region served: India
- Members: 147
- Official language: Hindi
- Chairman: Prime Minister of India

The National Integration Council (NIC) is a group of senior politicians and public figures in India that looks for ways to address the problems of communalism, casteism and regionalism. Council members include cabinet ministers, entrepreneurs, celebrities, media heads, chief ministers, and opposition leaders. The 2013 council was chaired by Prime Minister Manmohan Singh, and its members included movie star Jaya Bachchan, cardinal Baselios Cleemis, news editors: Shobhana Bhartia, Siddharth Varadarajan, Aroon Purie, Barkha Dutt, political leaders; Rajnath Singh, Kumari Mayawati, Bhim Singh, Sonia Gandhi, and billionaires; Anand Mahindra, Rajashree Birla, Cyrus Mistry, and Azim Premji.

== Origin ==
The National Integration Council originated in a conference convened by Prime Minister Jawaharlal Nehru in September–October 1961. The purpose was to find ways to counter problems that were dividing the country including attachment to specific communities, castes, religions and languages.

The conference set up the NIC to review national integration issues and make recommendations. The NIC met for the first time in June 1962. The fourteenth meeting was held in New Delhi on 13 October 2008. The fifteenth meeting was held on 10 September 2011 in New Delhi. The latest meeting (sixteenth meeting) was held on 23 September 2013.

The NIC was reconstituted and met again in August 2005. The new council had 103 members. The inaugural meeting was attended by Prime Minister Manmohan Singh and Congress Party leader Sonia Gandhi. Twelve Chief Ministers and twelve Union Ministers attended, as did leaders of all the main political parties. The NIC met in October 2008 soon after the United Progressive Alliance (UPA) government had taken office. In this special meeting chaired by Manmohan Singh, Prime Minister of India, the NIC raised its voice against spreading anti-Christian violence in India.

In April 2010 the council was reconstituted with 147 members, again chaired by Prime Minister Manmohan Singh. The fifteenth meeting was scheduled in Delhi for 10 September 2011. The agenda included discussion of measures to eliminate discrimination, promote communal harmony and curb communalism and communal violence. The attendees were also to discuss ways in which the state and police should handle civil disturbances and ways to curb radicalization of youth in the name of religion and caste. The Communal Violence Bill came under attack at the meeting, with Bharatiya Janata Party leaders saying the bill would encourage rather than curb communalism and that the bill unjustly assumed that in a riot the majority was always at fault.

On 19 October 2010 the government established a standing committee of the National Integration Council. Home Minister P. Chidambaram was appointed chairman and four Union Ministers and nine Chief Ministers were appointed members. The committee would decide on agenda items for future council meetings.

Baselios Cardinal Cleemis Catholicos has been nominated as a Member of the National Integration Council under category IX (Eminent Public Figures). The National Integration Council under the Chairmanship of the Prime Minister was reconstituted on 28 October 2013.
