= Bhim Singh (politician) =

Indian politician, activist, lawyer, and author (1941–2022)

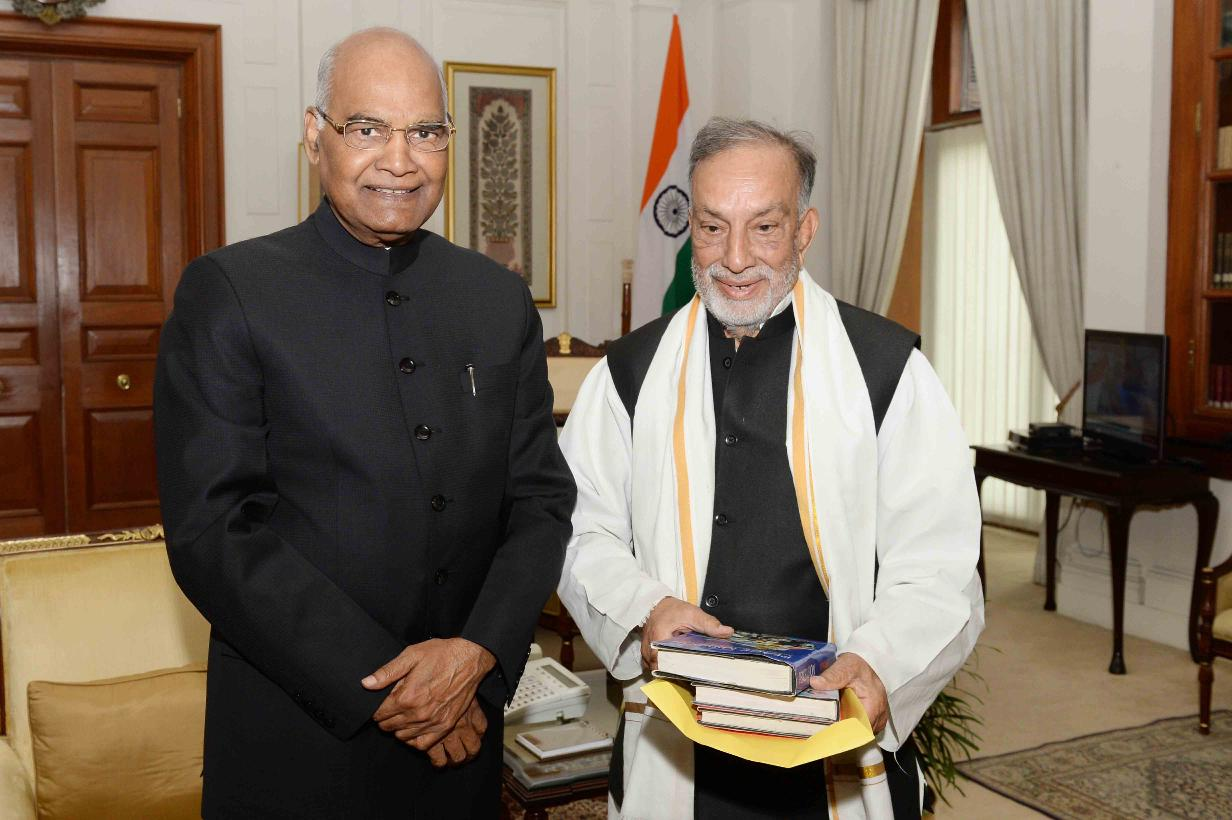
- Singh (right) in 2018

President of Jammu and Kashmir National Panthers Party
- In office 14 February 2021 – 31 May 2022
- Preceded by: Balwant Singh Mankotia
- Succeeded by: Jay Mala

Chairman of Jammu and Kashmir National Panthers Party
- In office 23 March 1982 – 27 October 2012
- Preceded by: Office established
- Succeeded by: Harsh Dev Singh

Member of Jammu and Kashmir Legislative Council
- In office 2003–2008

Member of Lok Sabha
- In office 1988
- Constituency: Udhampur (declared winner after a High Court ruling)

Member of Jammu and Kashmir Legislative Assembly
- In office 1977–1987
- Constituency: Chenani-Ghordi (Udhampur)

Personal details
- Born: 17 August 1941 Bhugterian, Jammu and Kashmir, British India
- Died: 31 May 2022 (aged 80) Jammu, Jammu and Kashmir, India
- Party: Jammu and Kashmir National Panthers Party (1982–2022)
- Other political affiliations: Indian National Congress (1966–1982)
- Spouse: Jay Mala
- Relations: Dogra dynasty General Zorawar Singh (great grandfather); Harsh Dev Singh (nephew); Balwant Singh Mankotia (nephew); Karan Singh (kinsman)
- Children: 1
- Education: GGM Science College, Jammu; Aligarh Muslim University; University of London; Inns of Court School of Law
- Website: Official Website; Panthers Party

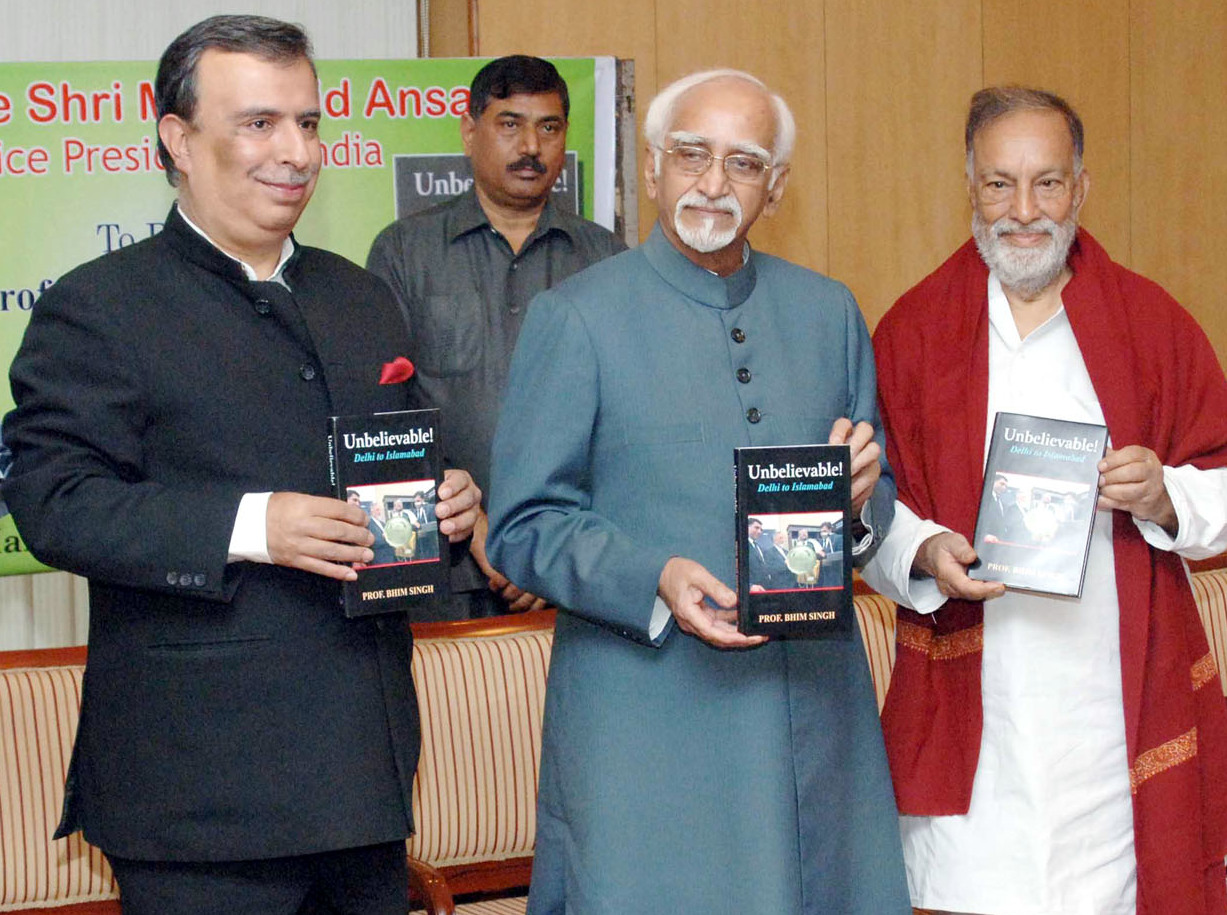
Vice President of India Ansari releases Prof. Bhim Singh's book Unbelievable – Delhi to Islamabad in New Delhi, India on 8 May 2015.

Bhim Singh (17 August 1941 – 31 May 2022) was an Indian politician, activist, lawyer and author. He was executive chairman of State Legal Aid Committee, founded by Chief Justice Bhagwati, for over 40 years from 1982 and freed hundreds of prisoners in India for free. He was the founder, president and chief patron of the socialist and secular Jammu and Kashmir National Panthers Party (JKNPP). Singh was Panthers Party chairman for 30 years from 1982 to 2012, chief patron from 2012-2021, and president from 14 February 2021 – 31 May 2022. In effect with over 40 years of controlling leadership, he was India's longest serving political party leader, and one of the longest serving leaders in the world.

Singh was an elected member of the Jammu and Kashmir Legislative Assembly from 1977 until 1987, from Chenani-Ghordi (Udhampur). As party leader, he contested the 1988 Udhampur by-election to the Lok Sabha. Despite leading by over 30,000 votes at the end of the count, he was declared to have lost in a repoll, and alleged rigging by the coalition. Singh had gone on hunger strike along with Atal Bihari Vajpayee against the Election Commission decision, in the poll, and brought the case before the Jammu and Kashmir High Court, that overturned the result.

Following which, he was nominated twice by Prime Ministers of India, Narasimha Rao, and Manmohan Singh as member of the National Integration Council in 1991 and 2008.

In 1985, in a landmark hearing, Singh was awarded fifty thousand rupees by the Supreme Court of India for his false imprisonment, after being suspended as a Member of the Jammu and Kashmir Legislative Assembly. In 2017, Singh defeated the government of India in the Supreme Court, enabling bar council elections to be held in Jammu and Kashmir for the very first time, in accordance to the Advocates Act 1961.

Prior to quitting the then ruling Congress party, he had reached its highest ranks. In 1973 he was appointed as president of the Youth Congress in Jammu and Kashmir by then prime minister Indira Gandhi, then served in 1977 as vice president of Indian Youth Congress, and finally as a general secretary for the All India Congress Committee.

In 1996, the party was notable in moving the Supreme Court and the Election Commission to return the democratic process to militancy-torn Jammu and Kashmir, when elections were held again in the state after a nine years hiatus.

Singh had survived an assassination attempt by the senior superintendent of police, while leading the Jammu student protests of 1966. He was known as Sher-e-Jammu (Lion of Jammu).

From 1967 to 1973 he travelled to 150 countries mostly by motorbike. His book documenting the journey, "Peace Mission Around the World on Motorcycle (Vol. II)", was released by Dr. Karan Singh, the first Sadr-i-Riyasat (President) of Jammu and Kashmir.

At times, he was criticized for his long standing friendships and legal counsel to socialist dictators worldwide.

In the 2002 Jammu and Kashmir Legislative assembly elections, the Panthers Party under Bhim Singh's leadership won all seats in its strong hold, the Udhampur district, and provided two cabinet ministers as part of a ruling coalition government along with PDP and Congress party. Until his death, he was reported as a potential candidate for the 2022 Indian vice presidential election and the presidential election.

== Early life ==
Bhim Singh was born Kunwar (Prince) Bhim Singh on 17 August 1941 in Bhugterian, Ramnagar in the Princely State of Jammu and Kashmir during the British Raj of India. His father was Thakur (Prince) Birbal Singh, a serviceman who served the Allies of World War II and later the Indian Army post-independence. Bhim Singh was the great-grandson of celebrated General Zorawar Singh, referred to by historians as the “Napoleon of India,” for his 19th century conquests of Ladakh, Baltistan, Skardu and the heartlands of Tibet.

In 1951, Bhim Singh's father had thousands of acres of land in Ramnagar forcibly taken with no compensation by the government of prime minister Sheikh Abdullah, leaving he and his eleven other siblings to starve in poverty as revenge against the Dogra dynasty, whose ruler had previously imprisoned prime minister Abdullah.

He was first sent to prison in 1953 while still a student after he had thrown confectionery at prime minister Abdullah during a visit to his school by him. At the time Bhim Singh's father Thakur Birbal was rallying against the government's land reforms in Jammu with Prem Nath Dogra and his anti-Abdullah Jammu Praja Parishad party.

As a college student Bhim Singh was a political activist going on hunger strike as early as 1959. In 1961, Bhim Singh was arrested following the death of Maharaja Hari Singh of Jammu and Kashmir in April 1961. He had led thousands of students from GGM Science College Jammu, in protest against ex Crown Prince Karan Singh and prime minister Bakshi Ghulam Mohammad, who had refused to fly the flag at half mast. Bhim Singh had led the college students to capture the Secretariat building, and climbed the roof, to fly the flag at half mast in honour of his deceased king. Bhim Singh managed to tear down the Jammu and Kashmir flag while armed police fired live ammunition at him. In the aftermath Bhim Singh was arrested by the deputy inspector general of police, and imprisoned in Katua and later Reasi jails. He was imprisoned for over six months from 1961 to 1962 in Jammu Central Jail, where he shared a jail cell with Sheikh Nazir the future general secretary of the National Conference party.

== Assassination attempt in Jammu protests, 1966 ==
Bhim Singh was again arrested in 1966 for leading thousands of students in protest while president of the Jammu and Kashmir Students Congress. During the protests of October 1966, that called for an establishment of a university in Jammu four students were killed and fifty-three injured. On 17 October 1966, Brij Mohan, Subhash Chandra and Gulshan Handa died in protests on the G.G.M. Science College site in Jammu. While the senior superintendent of police shot student leader Gurcharan Singh on 18 October, at a students march in Kanak Mandi, Jammu. The superintendent had aimed for Bhim Singh but M.P. Khosla, the future chief secretary of Jammu and Kashmir, had intervened to save Bhim Singh's life. Later Bhim Singh escaped curfew to visit and appeal to prime minister Indira Gandhi in New Delhi. Gandhi set up an inquiry into the affair under Pranab Mukherjee, the future president of India, that found several government and police officials responsible for the deaths. University of Jammu was subsequently opened in 1969.

== World tour on motorbike ==
Soon after he left India to travel the world from 1967 to 1973. Mostly by the way of motorbike he managed to visit more than a 150 countries. During his travels he was recorded by the Nigerian Times in 1970, as the first person to cross the Sahara Desert on motorcycle from Tan-Tan, Morocco to Senegal through Spanish Sahara and Mauritania. In Chile he was personally received by its then President Salvador Allende, and in the Middle East he met with Yasir Arafat who later accepted Bhim Singh's invitation to India.

His book documenting his early travels "Peace Mission: Around the World on Motorcycle (Vol. I)" was published by Har Anand Publications in 2009. A Hindi version for the book was released a year later by Sheila Dikshit, then Chief Minister of Delhi. At the book release K. Padmanabhaiah, former Home Secretary of India, recalled Bhim Singh's contributions to reinstating the democratic process in Jammu and Kashmir in the 1996 assembly elections which were held after a gap of nine years. His next travelogue "Unbelievable—Delhi to Islamabad," addressed the need for fairer treatment of Pakistani prisoners in India. It was released by the vice president of India, Mohammad Hamid Ansari. Guest of honour at the book release Amitabh Mattoo, compared Bhim Singh to Che Guevara, for his decades long lobbying for amendment to Article 370, to fully integrate Jammu and Kashmir into India.

The second volume of his book documenting his global travels, "Peace Mission Around the World on Motorcycle (Vol. II)", was released by Dr. Karan Singh the erstwhile crown prince of Jammu and Kashmir.

== Academics and student leadership ==
On his travelsn he attended the University of London earning an LL.M. and was the first Indian to be elected Secretary of the University of London Union in 1971. Later in 1972, Bhim Singh was called to the bar at law, as a specialist on Palestinian and Middle Eastern affairs. Before returning to Jammu and Kashmir to engage in politics, Bhim Singh worked as a professor of international law at Cambridge University.

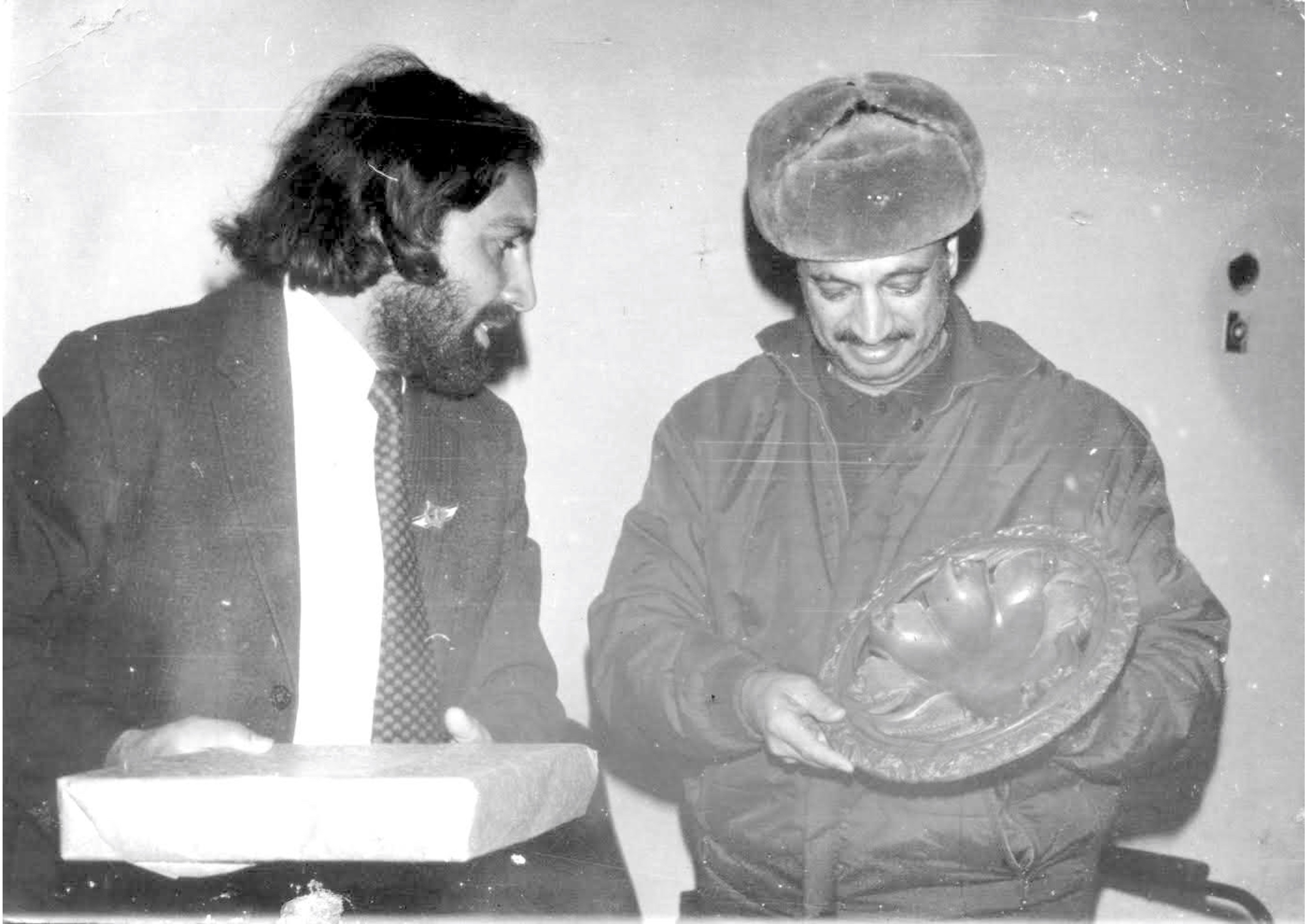
Bhim Singh and Yasser Arafat in Syria in the 1970s.

== Early activism ==
=== Friendship with Yasser Arafat ===
Bhim Singh has been a vocal supporter of Arafat for over three decades and was the chairman of the Indo-Palestine Friendship Society. He first met a young Yasser Arafat in 1968 at a Red Cross office on the east bank of the Jordan river. In 1973 Bhim Singh would travel to Syria in support of Arafat and join the PLO over the dispute of Golan Heights between Israel and Syria during the Yom Kippur War. When in 1992 Arafat was exiled from Lebanon, Bhim Singh would once again visit him in support in Tunis and a few years later Singh would travel to Ramallah to see Arafat, where he had set up a temporary capital for Palestine. In 2016 Palestinian ambassador Adnan Abu Alhaija, released Bhim Singh's documentary film on Yasser Arafat at a screening in New Delhi.

=== International visits ===
Bhim Singh first visited Hiroshima in 1972. Meeting survivors of the nuclear attacks on Japan, influenced his future campaigning for complete disarmament, and against American military interventions. He would return to Hiroshima several times throughout his political career on 6 August, the anniversary of the atomic bombing, to observe the fast for disarmament at Peace Memorial Park, and lecture on world unity.

He was the first Indian to travel to over 150 countries in the 1970s, and wrote a book to document his travels.

== Political career ==
Singh in 1973 was appointed president of the Youth Congress in Jammu and Kashmir by then prime minister Indira Gandhi, he then went on to become a general secretary of the All India Congress Committee.

=== Foundation of the Panthers Party ===
He would later leave the Congress Party due to political and economic differences to found his own political party, the Jammu and Kashmir National Panther's Party (JKNPP) on 23 March 1982, along with a few other prominent political personalities including Jay Mala the former president of the Indian Students Congress. He was twice elected as a Member of the Legislative Assembly in the state of Jammu and Kashmir.

Singh has also been a member of National Integration Council, first in 1991 nominated by prime minister of India Narasimha Rao, and then again in 2008 nominated by prime minister Dr. Manmohan Singh. He has contested seven times in the Indian parliamentary elections including against the former prime minister Rajiv Gandhi in Amethi, and former Bharatiya Janata Party leader LK Advani in New Delhi.

As an advocate he has won many landmark cases in the Supreme Court of India and has been jailed several times while leading movements for students and youth demands including opening a university in Jammu. He has been jailed 54 times, spending an aggregate 8 years in detention, out of which 18 times he was released by order of the Supreme Court.

=== Parliament elections ===
Bhim Singh stood in the 1984 general elections for Indian parliament, from the Udhampur constituency. He came second, to the Indian National Congress from which he had recently split to form the Panthers Party. He received 95,149 votes (26.24%).

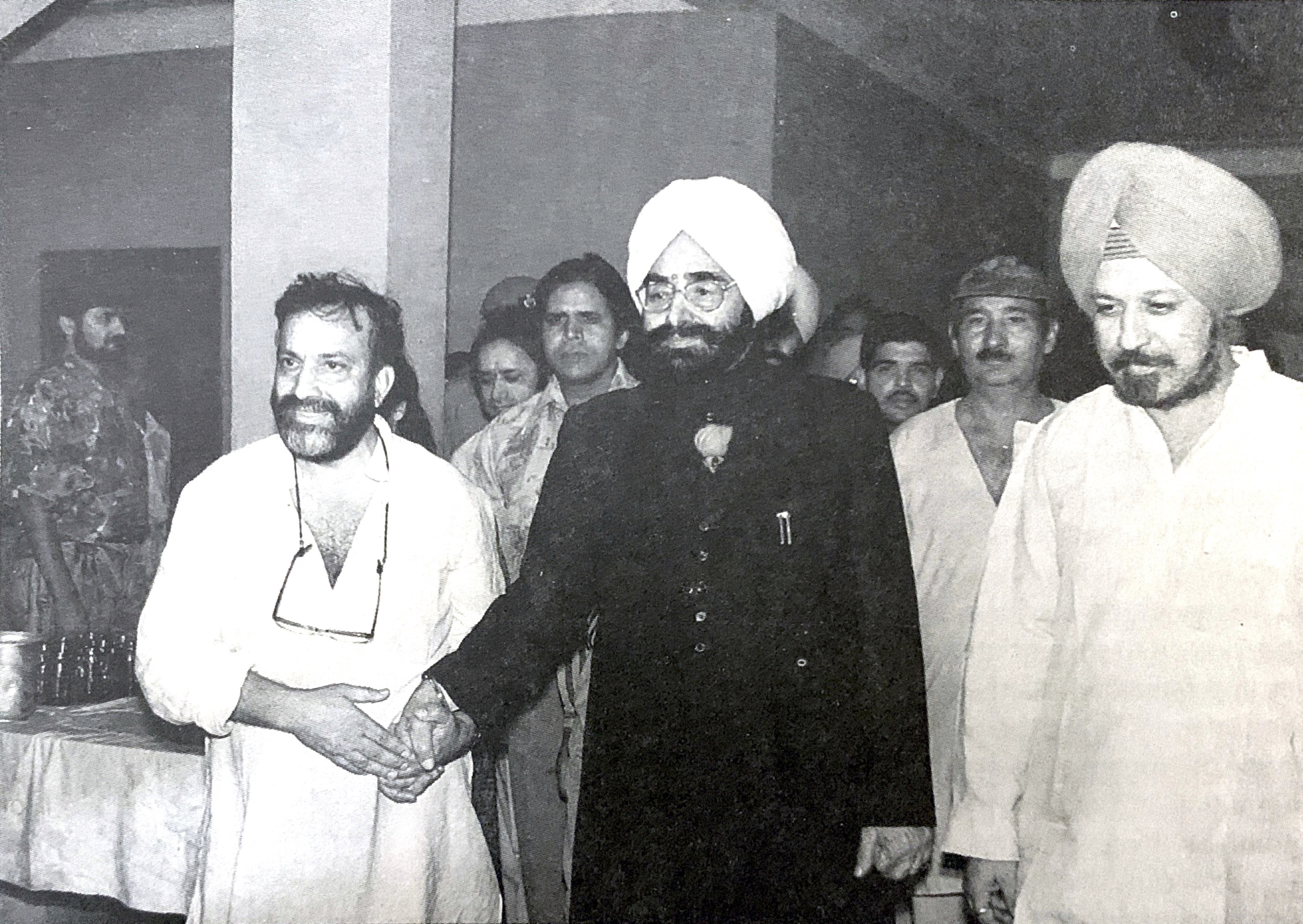
Bhim Singh with Zail Singh, President of India at the Rashtrapati Bhavan in New Delhi. Zail Singh had already congratulated Bhim Singh on his victory in the Udhampur By-Election in 1988, that the Election Commission of India then attempted to rig against him.

At the conclusion of the count on 19 June 1988, local radio and news in Jammu and Kashmir along with AIR correspondent, Ajit Singh announced Bhim Singh as the winner of the Udhampur by-election by 32,000 votes. The former president of India, Giani Zail Singh sent a message of congratulations to Bhim Singh on his victory. However, Union Home Minister of India, Buta Singh had dispatched Dr. Bhalla, Secretary of the Election Commission by a Home Ministry aircraft to Jammu. Bhalla ordered the returning officer, S.P. Kazal to refer the count result to the Election Commission of India in New Delhi. On 25 June 1988, Peri Shastri the chief election commissioner in New Delhi declared the Congress Party candidate Mohd. Ayub Khan, instead as the winner by 2,376 votes. The returning officer was later found to have committed suicide with no known motive.

Bhim Singh filed a review petition against the order of the Election Commission of India, stating the declared result was rigged at the instance of Rajiv Gandhi and Farooq Abdullah, leaders of the ruling coalition parties. Atal Behari Vajpayee joined Bhim Singh on hunger strike in front of the Election Commission offices in protest to the vote rigging. The Jammu and Kashmir High Court ruled in favour of Bhim Singh, however when Justice K.K. Gupta delivered the judgement four years later on 15 October 1992, the relevant session of parliament stood dissolved already.

On the night of rigging in June 1988, despite the dishonourable intentions of his opposition Congress party, Bhim Singh had helped to pacify an aggressive set of youth that had come in support of the Panthers Party to stop Dr. Bhalla from escaping to Delhi on a helicopter. Thousands of youth had gathered at the count venue which was at the Kathua Government Degree College. They demanded that the returning officer confirm the result there and then as opposed referring it to New Delhi. Bhim Singh later wrote in his book the Murder of Democracy in Jammu and Kashmir, that he had intervened to pacify the crowd at the time despite it costing him the result, as an outbreak of violence at the venue could have resulted in the deaths of hundreds of civilians by the heavily armed police that were present due to an escalation in the insurgency in Jammu and Kashmir.

In May 2019, Singh stood as a candidate for Indian parliament from Jammu, and was the poorest and oldest candidate in the constituency. At the time of the election he was over 78 years old and had just INR 30,000 ($420) cash, INR 16,000 ($224) bank deposit, and land valued at INR 38,000 ($533). He finished fourth out of 24 candidates, with 4,016 votes (0.27%).

=== Jammu and Kashmir state assembly 2002–2008 ===
In the Jammu and Kashmir state assembly elections in 2002, the party which he headed, the Jammu and Kashmir National Panthers Party, won four seats in the state government, enabling them to be part of the ruling coalition, with Bhim Singh's nephew Harsh Dev Singh serving as education minister. In its stronghold the Udhampur district, Bhim Singh's party had won all 3 seats. In 2007 he withdrew support to the Congress Party lead coalition, citing differences with the Peoples Democratic Party another member of the coalition. The state government fell soon after when the PDP itself withdrew their support from the Congress Party during the Amarnath land transfer controversy, placing the state under direct rule of the central government for a few months prior to the 2008 Jammu and Kashmir state assembly elections.

=== Chairman of Indo-Palestine Friendship Society ===
Bhim Singh after forging a friendship with Yasser Arafat on his world travels, on his return to India became chairman of the Indo-Palestine Friendship Society. The society under his leadership, has campaigned strongly for the sovereign recognition of the Palestine state. Bhim Singh has also been highly critical of the formation of the state of Israel, stating that "Israel was created in violation of UN Charter... to exploit and subjugate the Arabs," and referred to its presence in the Middle East as "illegal occupation." In 1970, Bhim Singh's book An examination of documents on which the State of Israel is based, was published by the PLO research center.

In 2000, the Indo-Palestine society staged a hunger strike protest in front of the Israeli embassy in New Delhi, demanding that Israel withdraw from Palestine, and adhere to UN resolutions. Palestinian ambassador, Adli Sadeq in 2010 at a conference organized by Indo-Palestine Friendship Society, had criticized the government of India, for issuing a weak statement in regards to the killing of nine activists by Israel in the Gaza flotilla raid. In 2015, Bhim Singh criticized the Indian media and prime minister Narendra Modi, for their silence in regards to the unfriendly treatment and embarrassment suffered by the president of India, Pranab Mukherjee at an Israeli airport. Israeli authorities had barred the Indian president, from taking four satellite systems intended as gifts for the Palestinian Al-Aqsa University in Ramallah, which Bhim Singh believed to be an insult to India as well as Palestine.

== Bhim Singh v. State of Jammu and Kashmir, 1985 ==
On 17 August 1985 Bhim Singh was suspended from the opening of the budget session of the Jammu and Kashmir Legislative Assembly that was scheduled for 11 September. He subsequently challenged the suspension in the Jammu and Kashmir High Court. After his suspension was stayed by High Court on 9 September, Bhim Singh left Jammu for Srinagar to attend the Legislative Assembly session. En route at 3:00 am on 10 September, he was intercepted by the police at Qazi Kund, 70 km from Srinagar. He was taken away by the police and kept prisoner at an undisclosed location. After attempts to locate him proved futile his wife and advocate Jay Mala then moved the court to locate Bhim Singh. On 13 September, the court ordered the inspector general of the police to inform Jay Mala where her husband was being held in custody. Only after this was Singh brought before a magistrate for the first time on 14 September. In the case the court found statements by M.A. Mir, superintendent of police to be false, neither could the superintendent explain why he expected Bhim Singh to travel through Qazi Kund on the night of his arrest. The court also found the lengthy affidavit filed by inspector general Khajuria contained statements of facts that he could not possibly have been aware of.

The court found that Bhim Singh was not produced before the magistrate nor sub judge who issued the police orders of remand and that the police obtained the orders in surreptitious circumstances at the residence of the magistrate and after hours from the sub judge. The Supreme Court judge, O. Chinnappa Reddy criticized the conduct of the magistrate and sub judge stating that they had no concern for the subject out of either casual behavior or worse that they had potentially colluded with the police who had deliberately acted mala fide. The court ruled that there "certainly was a gross violation of Shri Bhim Singh's constitutional rights" and condemned the "authoritarian acts of the police." The judges though stated that the police were but minions and that they were in no doubt that the top levels of the government of Jammu and Kashmir where ultimately responsible.

The Supreme Court in a landmark judgement that impacted tort law in India, awarded Bhim Singh a compensation of fifty thousand rupees for his illegal detention and false imprisonment by the police. Bhim Singh had left jail with a fractured leg and claimed during his false imprisonment the police and state agencies had made an attempt on his life.

== Human rights lawyer ==
As a human rights activist and lawyer in the Supreme Court of India he has aided thousands of helpless prisoners, farmers, employees, and youth all over the country. Through writs he had filed through his political party and the State Legal Aid Committee which he headed, he has secured the release of 300 Pakistani, Pakistan administered Kashmir and Afghan prisoners from Indian jails, some of whom had been held for decades. Bhim Singh has also served as the chairman of the executive Committee of Legal aid with chief justice Bhagwati who described him as, "as crusader for truth and justice." Bhim Singh in December 2016, was re-elected unopposed as a senior executive member of the Supreme Court Bar Association.

== 1996 Supreme Court Case ==
In 1996, Prof. Bhim Singh filed a petition in the Supreme Court of India, that demanded the Election Commission of India reinstate the democratic process in Jammu and Kashmir. The Indian central government had indefinitely delayed elections to the Jammu and Kashmir Legislative Assembly for over nine years, and placed the state under virtual martial rule by proxy control of the central government in Delhi. They had done so citing a rise in the violent insurgency in Jammu and Kashmir. However, Prof. Bhim Singh was successful in his petition, arguing that stopping the democratic process was fuelling the insurgency, rather than bringing it under control. After over nine years of martial rule, with no elected representation of the people, the democratic process was finally returned by order of the Supreme Court in April, when it have judgement in favour of Prof. Bhim Singh. Subsequently, the 1996 Jammu and Kashmir Legislative Assembly elections where held in September.

== Call for Governor's Rule ==
After the killing of Hizbul Mujahideen commander, Burhan Wani the state of Jammu and Kashmir was engulfed in violent riots leaving over 2,000 injured and the deaths of several civilians and CRPF personnel. In July 2016, Bhim Singh attempted through the judiciary to have the State government dissolved and replaced by Governor's rule. He had attempted to do this by a petition filed on behalf of the Panthers Party calling for gubernatorial rule under section 92 of the Jammu and Kashmir constitution. While the Supreme Court denied Singh's petition after two weeks of curfew in the State, it called for a report by prime minister Modi's government on the matter. T.S. Thakur, the chief justice of India had requested solicitor general Ranjit Kumar present a response to Singh's petition on the "ground realities" in Jammu and Kashmir. On 22 August 2016, the Supreme Court stated that the situation of curfew and unrest in the state of Jammu and Kashmir could not be dealt with by the courts. It however asked Bhim Singh to join a delegation composed of prime minister Narendra Modi and the leader of the opposition former chief minister Omar Abdullah to find a political solution to the issue. The court further requested that solicitor general Ranjit Kumar arrange a meeting between prime minister Modi and Bhim Singh.

== 2017 Supreme Court case ==
Despite the passing of the Advocates Act, 1961 Jammu and Kashmir remained the only state of India not allowed to elect a bar council. In February 2017, in a historic judgement, the Supreme Court of India ruled in favor of Bhim Singh, allowing the state for the first time to elect its bar council. In the case lawyers for the Union of India, had argued that it was not conducive to hold bar elections in Jammu and Kashmir. However, Bhim Singh challenged the government's logic, arguing that if bar council elections could not be held in the state due to militancy, that it would not have made sense to hold assembly and parliamentary elections either.

== Attempted party expulsion and presidency ==
Bhim Singh was expelled from the Panthers Party in November 2020, by his nephew Harsh Dev Singh, who he had previously nominated as the chairman of the party. Harsh Dev Singh had said he had expelled Bhim Singh for meeting with the leaders of the People's Alliance for Gupkar Declaration (PAGD), which included Farooq Abdullah and Mehbooba Mufti, that Harsh Dev Singh called anti-national.

However, following a media offensive by Bhim Singh, and an appeal in support by former chief minister Omar Abdullah, a fact finding committee of the Panthers Party headed by its president Balwant Singh Mankotia found Bhim Singh had only visited the PAGD meeting in a personal capacity, and revoked his expulsion.

In February 2021, Balwant Singh Mankotia himself resigned from his post as president of the party citing family reasons, and was replaced by his uncle Bhim Singh who was elected unanimously as president, and back in official active command of the political party he founded, after a period over eight years when he had stepped down as chairman in 2012.

After being elected president of Panthers Party at the age of 79, Bhim Singh on 14 February 2021, gave a statement to the media, that "Panthers party shall continue its peaceful fight for justice and equity... we shall all fight for truth and justice, equality and equity for all, irrespective of their religion, region, caste or class," along with reinstating the statehood of Jammu and Kashmir, that had been previously converted into a union territory of India, on 6 August 2019, following the Jammu and Kashmir Reorganisation Act, 2019.

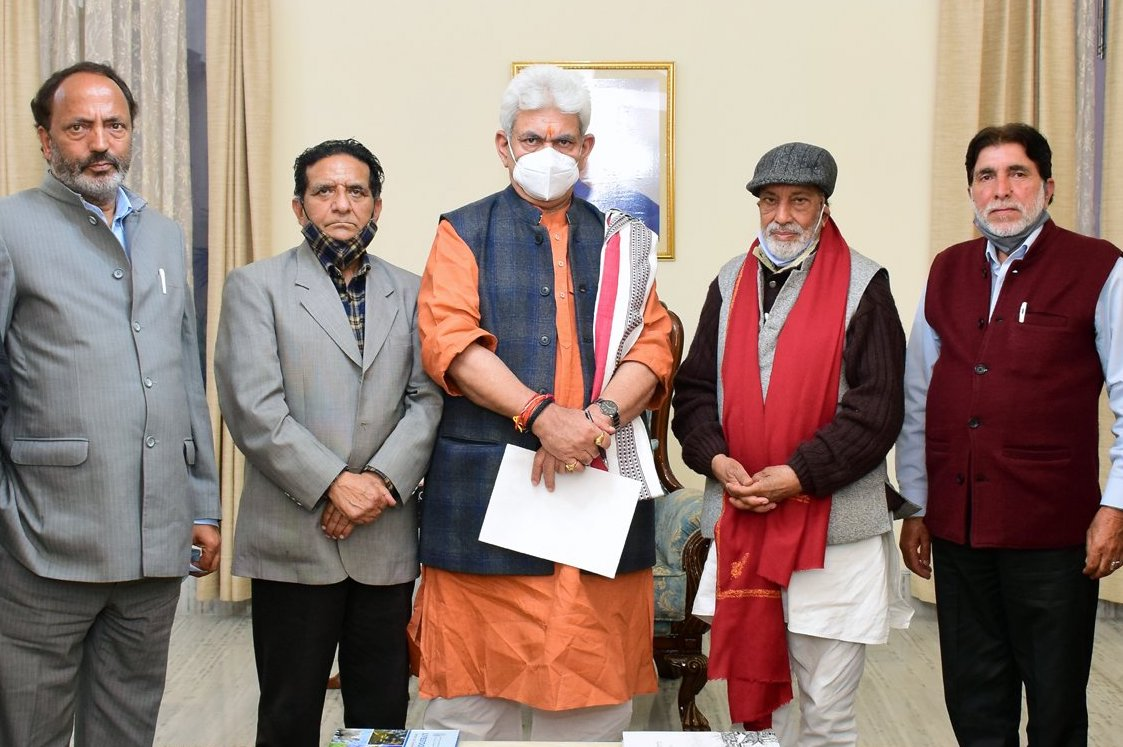
Prof. Bhim Singh leads a Panthers Party delegation to meet Manoj Sinha, Lieutenant Governor of Jammu and Kashmir on 22 February 2021.

== Later activities ==
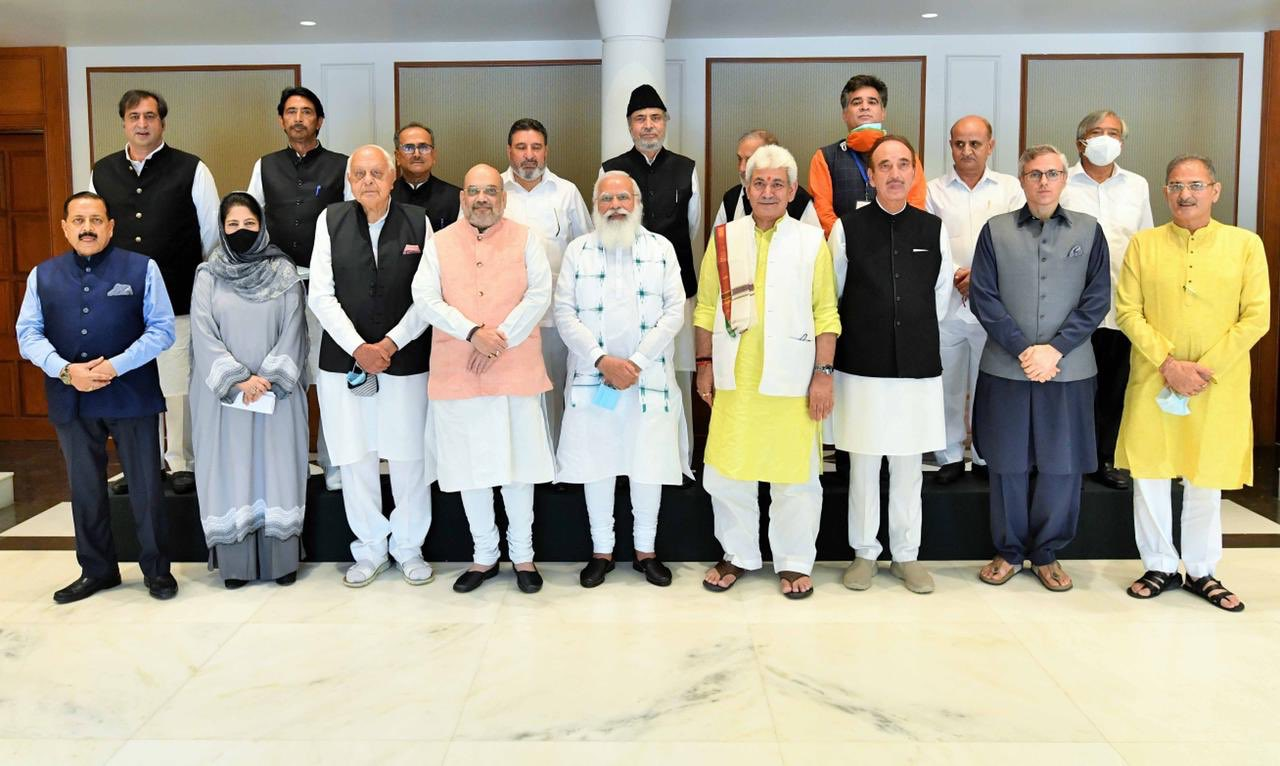
Bhim Singh, stands in back row directly to the right and behind Prime Minister Narendra Modi. He is partially blocked in the photo by the Lieutenant Governor of Jammu and Kashmir Manoj Sinha.

Bhim Singh was a member of the 22 person delegation to discuss the future of Jammu and Kashmir, chaired by Prime Minister Modi at his residence in New Delhi, India on 24 June 2021. Other members of the delegation included home minister of India Amit Shah, lieutenant governor of Jammu and Kashmir Manoj Sinha, and former chief ministers Farooq Abdullah, Omar Abdullah, Ghulam Nabi Azad, and Mehbooba Mufti. At the meeting Bhim Singh spoke of the need to restore the statehood of Jammu and Kashmir, and a need to hold elections that had been delayed by over 2 years. His demands were later broadcast on national television following the meeting.

A day before the meeting Bhim Singh was mentioned in the news as a potential nominee for 2022 vice-president of India election, on a joint ticket with his kinsman Karan Singh who was reported as a potential candidate for President of India.

=== Potential presidential nomination ===
Bhim Singh was reported in the Indian media as potential candidate for the President of India in the 2022 election, for the ruling BJP party despite having been in long opposition to them.

== Personal life ==
He married Panthers party co-founder Jay Mala. They have one son, Ankit Love who was leader of the One Love Party in Great Britain.

== Honors ==
He was the Convenor of the Council for Promotion of Dogri Language, Culture and History a body which awards the Dogra Ratan awards. In 2011 the president of India Pratibha Patil, presented the awards at the General Zorawar Singh Auditorium.

The Supreme Court of India held a Full Court Reference and two minutes silence in the Chief Justice Court in his honour on 15 December 2022.

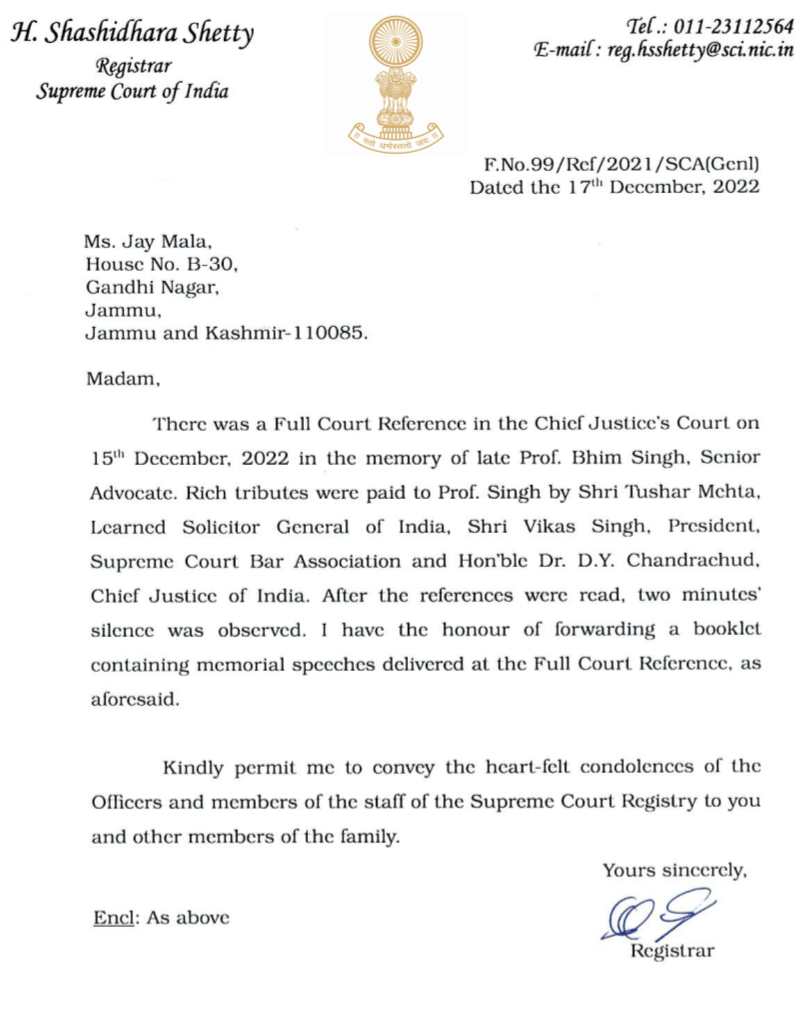
A letter written to Jay Mala from the Supreme Court of India following the Full Court Reference and two ministers of silence held in honour of her husband Bhim Singh in the Chief Justice Court on 15 December 2022.

== Death ==
Singh died on 31 May 2022 from a long-illness at his home in Jammu, India at aged 80. Several political leaders including prime minister Modi, ex prime minister Deve Gowda, home minister Amit Shah, defence minister Rajnath Singh, J&K lieutenant Governor Manoj Sinha, Kashmir crown prince Karan Singh, former Jammu & Kashmir chief ministers Farooq Abdullah, Omar Abdullah, and Mehbooba Mufti wrote condolences in tribute to him.

Thousands of people attended his cremation ceremony, which was broadcast on television, and held in his ancestral village near Ramnagar, Udhampur on 1 June 2022.

H D Devegowda
(@H_D_Devegowda)
tweeted:

Sad to hear about the demise of Prof Bhim Singh, founder of the JK panthers party. My respectful tributes to his departed soul. He would be remembered as a grassroots leader who devoted his life to the welfare of Jammu & Kashmir. Sincere condolences to his family and supporters.

31 May 2022

Narendra Modi
(@narendramodi)
tweeted:

Prof Bhim Singh Ji will be remembered as a grassroots leader who devoted his life for the welfare of Jammu and Kashmir. He was very well read and scholarly. I will always recall my interactions with him. Saddened by his demise. Condolences to his family and supporters. Om Shanti.

31 May 2022

== Controversies ==
=== Defence of Saddam Hussein ===
Bhim Singh along with George Galloway, Natwar Singh and General Baig was a member of the Co-ordination Committee Against Economic Sanctions headed by Iraq's deputy prime minister Tariq Aziz. In 2005 he was called ‘Vishwa Ratna,’ as possibly the only person in the world who could refuse 7.3 million barrels of oil vouchers as illustrated in Table 3 of Vol.II in the report of the UN Committee dealing with Oil-for-food program headed by Paul Volcker during sanctions placed on Iraq. In essence saying no to oil vouchers that would have been worth over $500 million (Note: 7,300,000 barrels multiplied by $69.91 (2005 WTI crude oil price high) = $510,343,000.) at the time of the Paul Volcker Committee report in 2005. Neither was he served notice to appear in front of the United Nations investigation on the matter. Bhim Singh says that he had also turned down a thick envelope stuffed with cash, at the residence of the Iraqi ambassador in New Delhi, and that he only ever accepted a few token gifts from Saddam, like a bottle of fine alcohol and a Swiss Longines watch with the Ba'ath Party insignia on its dial .

Later, Bhim Singh was named by Saddam as an advocate to plead his case in the Trial of Saddam Hussein, and set up the International Defence Committee for Saddam, leading a team of 11 lawyers. However, the United States blocked him from traveling to Baghdad. In 2006 at a UNI press conference he had stated that, "a dead Saddam can be more dangerous than a living Saddam for the US and UK... the execution may take a moment. But its consequences will be dangerous and long-term."

=== Eviction notice from VP House ===
Bhim Singh was given guest accommodations at VP House in New Delhi and Jammu and Kashmir in 1991, for security reasons by prime minister Chandra Shekhar due to the threat posed to his life by terrorist groups in the Jammu and Kashmir insurgency. In 2015, he was first asked to vacate his accommodation at VP House by the Urban Development Ministry and then given an 8-week eviction notice by the Supreme Court, questioning how he could have stayed as a guest for "30 years" at VP House which is usually meant for visitors of members of parliament. The television channel NewsX reported the story as an abuse of political power for luxury accommodation. Bhim Singh and his Panthers Party however protested the eviction at Jantar Mantar, stating that the accommodations were just a one room-suite used as offices to receive and assist Kashmiris with grievances. Bhim Singh believed that the eviction actions were politically motivated due his party's opposition to prime minister Narendra Modi and the BJP-PDP coalition government in Jammu and Kashmir levying tax on Hindu pilgrims traveling to Vaishno Devi and civil-rights cases that he had pending in the Supreme Court on behalf of Pakistani refugees against the government. Earlier Bhim Singh and his Panther's Party had also protested the cut down of his 22 personnel Z security cover by the BJP-PDP government as an act of political discrimination.

=== Stance against CIA, ISI & Mossad ===
Bhim Singh has long alleged that the CIA, Mossad and ISI had become active in the 1970s to remove India's prime minister Indira Gandhi, from power and dissect Jammu and Kashmir away from under Indian administration. Singh who was named as a defence advocate by Slobodan Milosevic for his trial at the Hague claimed that "CIA has not learnt a lesson from the past and it wants to dissect India the way it did with USSR, Yugoslavia and elsewhere." He continued to state that the 2015 coalition between the widely opposed views of the BJP and PDP had continued links to an ISI agenda to separate Jammu and Kashmir from India. Further alleging that the Hurriyat political party was in fact backed by Pakistan's ISI and acted as its agent in the state.

Later, declassified documents from the CIA's Operation Cyclone (1979-1989), revealed that the CIA funded the Jihadi warriors, mujahideen through Pakistan and its ISI. It was the most expensive known covert operation conducted by the CIA, with over $20 billion spent on training and arming the militants.

=== Support for Gaddafi ===
In 2011, Bhim Singh who was also chairman of the Afro-Asian Solidarity Council appealed to the UN Security Council to intervene in the air-raids on Libya on the basis that they were against UN charter. Bhim Singh then visited Libya and encouraged Muammar Gaddafi to invoke democratic reforms at grass root levels. Afterwards he wrote an essay in support of Muammar Gaddafi and condemned his capture and subsequent death as "barbaric," by rebels that he claimed were under a "US lead-NATO command." Bhim Singh believed that a bloody civil war may result as consequence of tribal disputes post-Gaddafi, and that the bifurcation or trifurcation of Libya itself maybe on the US agenda for what he claimed would give a better hold over oil resources. He claimed Gaddafi had been on a US hit list as he had refused to join NATO and for his 1975 "Green Book", that had also put him in opposition to some other Arab leaders and kings that the US was supporting. At the time Bhim Singh had also stated a need for a universal plan for democracy of all countries under the ruthless rule of sheikhs, kings, sultans and dictators.

=== Stance against Abdullah ===
Bhim Singh had alleged that his opposition Abdullah family were secret billionaires in an interview with NewsX TV channel, calling for a CBI investigation into the sudden death of Haji Yusuf in police custody. Yusuf linked to money corruption within the Abdullah's National Conference party had died in custody vomiting blood, after being detained for hours at the private residence of Omar Abdullah, the then chief minister of Jammu and Kashmir.

=== Defence of Slobodan Milošević ===
Bhim Singh had first met Yugoslavian president Milošević at the height of his power, in his Belgrade palace where Milošević cooked an omelette for him. Bhim Singh was the only lawyer from Asia, to be on Slobodan Milošević's defence team, headed by former US attorney general Ramsey Clark, at the International Criminal Tribunal for the former Yugoslavia in The Hague. Singh traveled to The Hague to meet Milošević in a high security prison in August 2005. He had to cross 12 security check points prior arriving at defendant's prison cell. Milošević told Singh that he feared he would be killed soon and that he was being poisoned. Milošević was found dead in his prison cell on 11 March 2006, according to autopsies he died of a heart attack. Bhim Singh's book The Judgement on NATO Aggression Against Yugoslavia was published in 2007.

=== Comparison to Fidel Castro ===
After a 1971 meeting with Fidel Castro in Cuba, Bhim Singh had long admired and praised his leadership style, but had criticized his governance of Cuba. Bhim Singh himself had been criticized as a dictator in similar fashion to Castro for nominating individuals to office within his party without holding democratic elections.

== Work ==
=== Bibliography ===
- Unbelievable-Delhi to Islamabad by Bhim Singh (Har Anand Publications, 2015), ISBN 9788124118177
- Jammu and Kashmir: the blunders and way out by Bhim Singh (Har Anand Publications, 2011), ISBN 8124115877 ISBN 9788124115879
- Peace Mission: Around the World on Motorcycle (Vol. I) by Bhim Singh (Har Anand Publications, 2009), ISBN 8124114323 ISBN 9788124114322
- Peace Mission Around the World on Motorcycle (Vol. II) by Bhim Singh (Har Anand Publications, 2009), ISBN 8124114641 ISBN 9788124114643
- Kashmir, A Mirage: Correspondence on Jammu & Kashmir Between Bhim Singh and Prime Ministers of India by Bhim Singh (Har Anand Publications 2007), ISBN 8124106185 ISBN 978-8124106181
- The Judgement on NATO Aggression Against Yugoslavia by Bhim Singh (Har Anand Publications 2007), ISBN 9788124106419
- Chetna Yaatra: Kargil Se Kanyakumari (Hindi) by Bhim Singh (Har Anand Publications, 2003), ISBN 8124109273 ISBN 9788124109274
- Murder of Democracy in Jammu and Kashmir by Bhim Singh (Har Anand Publications 2002) ISBN 8124108641 ISBN 9788124108642
- Autonomy or Secession: Jammu and Kashmir by Bhim Singh (Har Anand Publications 2002) ISBN 8124107491 ISBN 978-8124107492
- Iraq: a heroic resistance by Bhim Singh (Har Anand Publications, 2001) ISBN 8124108331 ISBN 9788124108338
- Flames in Kashmir by Bhim Singh (Har Anand Publications 1998), ISBN 8124105715 ISBN 978-8124105719
- An examination of documents on which the State of Israel is based by Bhim Singh and Angelina Helou (P.L.O. Research Center, 1970)

=== Filmography ===
==== Documentary film ====
- Star of Bethlehem (2014)
- Yasser Arafat (2016)

== Notes ==
Notes
