= Jay Mala =

Indian politician (1958–2023)

President of Jammu and Kashmir National Panthers Party
- In office 31 May 2022 – 4 April 2023
- Preceded by: Bhim Singh
- Succeeded by: Harsh Dev Singh

President of Indian Students Congress
- In office 1979–2023

Personal details
- Born: 22 August 1958 Fatehpur, Uttar Pradesh, India
- Died: 26 April 2023 (aged 64) Jammu, Jammu and Kashmir, India
- Party: Jammu and Kashmir National Panthers Party (1982–2023)
- Other political affiliations: Indian National Congress (1975–1982)
- Spouse: Bhim Singh
- Relations: Harsh Dev Singh (Nephew-in-law); Balwant Singh Mankotia (Nephew-in-Law)
- Children: Ankit Love
- Education: University of Delhi

Jay Mala (22 August 1958 – 26 April 2023) was an Indian journalist, politician, advocate and social activist. She was a senior advocate of the Supreme Court of India, who filed over 600 cases and won each one, including a 1985 landmark case where she sued the State of Jammu and Kashmir changing tort law in India. Mala was co-founder of the Jammu and Kashmir National Panthers Party (JKNPP) in 1982. On 7 May 2022 she became Chairperson of the Panthers Party Working Committee, and was de facto president of Panthers Party from 31 May 2022 to 4 April 2023.

During the period of insurgency in Jammu and Kashmir, she was one of only seven female candidates, out of a total 512 candidates in the 1983 Jammu and Kashmir general election.

Mala was President of the Indian Student Congress in 1979. From 2017 she worked as a contributing editor for National Herald, a newspaper founded by the first Prime Minister of India.

== Career ==
=== 1979 Student Protest Arrest at India Gate ===
Jay Mala as the President of Indian Student Congress in 1979 led thousands of university students in protest against the Janata Party government at India Gate, New Delhi. Then minister of external affairs and future prime minister Atal Bihari Vajpayee attempted to address the angry crowd but was pelted with stones. While bleeding from the head he was protected by Jay Mala, who led him to escape into the neighbouring Parliament building. In the aftermath of the protests Vajpayee personally secured the release of Jay Mala from Parliament Street Police Station.

=== Jay Mala vs. Home Secretary, Government of Jammu and Kashmir ===
In 1982 she won a case against the Government of Jammu and Kashmir in the Supreme Court. Jay Mala, acting as a legal aid advocate, secured the release of Riaz Ahmed, proving he was still a minor when he was falsely imprisoned in Jammu and Kashmir. Chief justice P. N. Bhagwati quashed the detention stating the prisoner was a school boy protesting for student rights and not as the police had falsely accused him of being an adult threatening grievous bodily harm armed with a knife.

The case set precedent in India for determining the age of a minor detainee. The judges established that a two years margin of error be applied in judicial proceedings to radiological and orthopaedic test results used to determine age in favor of the accused. The case has been continuously quoted for three decades to secure the release of minors across India, and influenced legislation of the Juvenile Justice Act, 2000.

=== 1983 Jammu and Kashmir General Elections ===
Mala co-founded the Panthers Party in 1982, that contested all seats in the 1983 Jammu and Kashmir Legislative Assembly elections. Jay Mala stood in the Udhampur constituency as the only female candidate against sixteen other men. She came third with 3,768 votes (13.75%).

Mala polled the second most votes out of all women candidates in the general election. Only seven females had contested out of a total 512 candidates.

=== Bhim Singh, MLA vs State of J&K ===
In 1984 her husband Bhim Singh, an elected opposition member, was illegally arrested and hidden by the police while en route from Jammu for a debate at the Jammu and Kashmir Legislative Assembly in Srinagar scheduled for 11 September, where his vote may have been crucial. He was not produced before a Magistrate for four days and kept hidden in an undisclosed location. Jay Mala filed a case against the Government of Jammu and Kashmir, including then Chief Minister Ghulam Mohammad Shah as a respondent in order to find her husband and set him free.

After Bhim Singh's release she was his advocate in suing the government for compensation. In a 1985 landmark judgement, O. Chinnappa Reddy awarded her husband 50,000 rupees. The order of the judgment as the first case for monetary compensation for false detainment, along with its high profile nature made it a quoted case in future litigations across India impacting law of tort.

In the case judge Reddy also ruled on the politicized nature of her husband's false imprisonment, stating that the two police officers who acted with "mischievous or malicious intent" were mere subordinates and that he did "not have the slightest doubt that the responsibility lies elsewhere and with the higher echelons of the Government of Jammu and Kashmir."

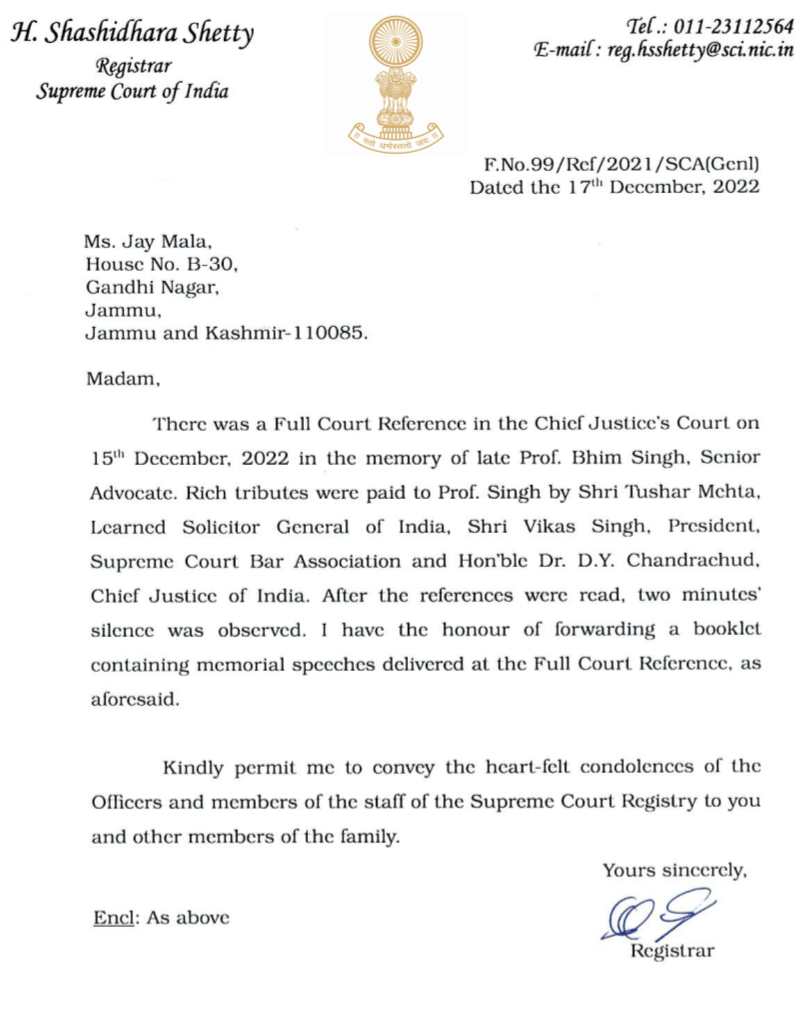
A letter written to Jay Mala from the Supreme Court of India following the Full Court Reference and two ministers of silence held in honour of her husband Bhim Singh in the Chief Justice Court on 15 December 2022.

=== 1987 Jammu and Kashmir General Elections ===
In the 1987 Jammu and Kashmir Legislative Assembly elections she was a candidate from the Jammu East constituency. She came fourth out of 19 candidates with 634 votes (2.25%).

There were just 13 females out of a total 528 candidates in the general election.

=== 2019 Citizenship Amendment Act protests correspondent ===
Jay Mala wrote for the National Herald, strongly in support of protestors during the uprisings across India and against the Citizenship Amendment Act. She wrote in favor of university students championing their progressive secular values, while reporting and berating incidences of police brutality, such as the use of tear gas inside the library of Jamia Millia Islamia University, in contravention of United Nations norms. She highly criticized the government's handling of the Citizenship Amendment Act protests, and gross atrocities committed under the NRC, where thousands of allegedly stateless persons were being imprisoned in cramped detention centres in India, under inhumane conditions. Some who had died in detention, later had their bodies sent to their families in India.

Her article on the Republic Day of India, 26 January 2020 went viral with over 100,000 views in 24 hours, and was the top story search result on Google for keyword "India", reporting on a resolution proposed by 154 MEPs in the European Union Parliament condemning the Citizenship Amendment Act.

=== 2022 Chairperson of Panthers Party Working Committee ===
On 9 February 2022, she was Chairperson of the Panthers Party Working Committee, that passed resolution that the next legislative assembly elections will be contested under leadership of former education minister Harsh Dev Singh.

=== 2022 Viral Television Interview on Twitter ===
Jay Mala's television interview in Jammu and Kashmir went viral on Twitter, receiving over 450,000 views in 4 days, and was covered by national news in India on 26 March 2022. She had objected to a journalist introducing her as the wife of Prof. Bhim Singh, and requested that he instead better introduce her by her own name, Jay Mala, and further that she was a journalist and an advocate, that has filed 600 cases and won each one.

=== Now magazine ===
In the 1980s, Jay Mala founded and published political news magazine Now, and had hired renowned journalist Raman Swamy as her editor.

== Personal life ==
Mala was married to Bhim Singh, leader of the Panthers Party. Her son Ankit Love is the leader of the One Love Party of Great Britain. She named him Love, with hope he would bring peace to the Kashmir conflict.

Mala was born to a Goud Saraswat Brahmin family, and was descendant from the Hindu Shahis of Afghanistan.

== Death ==
Mala died on 26 April 2023, at the age of 64. Her body was kept ten days in the mortuary while family members fought for control over it and the political party she founded, and her only child Ankit Love was banned from entering India. After days of drama in the national news, Ankit Love had the ban uplifted by the government, and arrived from London to Jammu, to authorise a post-mortem on the body on 5 May 2023 at Government Medical College Jammu, and a police investigation opened into Jay Mala’s alleged murder. The post-mortem results were released to police on 16 August 2023, however unconventionally the police refused to declassify the results of the post-mortem with the bereaved family members, despite protests demanding such by the JKNPP, the political party founded by Jay Mala.

On 19 July 2023, at the Senior Superintendent of Police’s office in Jammu, hundreds of Panthers Party protesters led by former cabinet minister Harsh Dev Singh demanded arrest of those accused of assassinating Jay Mala, as well as stealing money from her accounts and burning down a property belonging to her husband.

On 2 March 2023, it was reported in the news that Jay Mala feared that there was a plot to assassinate her. She died less than one year following the mysterious death of her husband Prof. Bhim Singh, and two months after alleging that he was murdered by agents of the BJP. Following her death her son, Ankit Love alleged that agents of the ruling BJP party were responsible for Jay Mala’s death and demanded a public enquiry into the matter. Love also stated that the Jammu and Kashmir Legislative elections had been purposely postponed by the BJP government for over three years to eliminate both his parents who led the only recognised political party in India from Jammu province.
