= Mines and Minerals (Development and Regulation) Act, 1957 =

1957 Act of the Parliament of India

Parliament of India
- Long title: An Act to provide for the development and regulation of mines and minerals under the control of the Union
- Citation: Act 67 of 1957
- Enacted by: Parliament of India
- Enacted: 28 December 1957

Amended by
- 1958, 1960, 1972, 1978, 1986, 1994, 1999, 2010, 2015
- Status: In force

The Mines and Minerals (Regulation and Development) Act, 1957 is an Act of the Parliament of India enacted to regulate the mining sector in India. It was amended in 2015 and 2016. This act forms the basic framework of mining regulation in India.

This act is applicable to all minerals except minor minerals and atomic minerals. It details the process and conditions for acquiring a mining or prospecting licence in India. Mining minor minerals comes under the purview of state governments. River sand is considered a minor mineral. For mining and prospecting in forest land, prior permission is needed from the Ministry of Environment and Forests.

== Amendments ==
=== 2015 ===
The Mines and Minerals (Development and Regulation) Amendment Act, 2015

Parliament of India
- Long title: An Act further to amend the Mines and Minerals (Development and Regulation) Act, 1957.
- Citation: Act No 10 of 2015
- Passed by: Lok Sabha
- Passed: 3 March 2015
- Passed by: Rajya Sabha
- Passed: 20 March 2015
- Assented to: 26 March 2015
- Commenced: 12 January 2015

Legislative history

Initiating chamber: Lok Sabha
- Bill citation: 18-C of 2015
- Introduced: 24 February 2015

Repeals
- Mines and Minerals (Development and Regulation) Amendment Ordinance, 2015
- Status: In force

The act was amended by The Mines and Minerals (Development and Regulation) Amendment Act, 2015 replacing the ordinance promulgated on 12 January 2015. The bill sought to bring transparency to the allocation of mining licence process by auctions. It was passed in the Lok Sabha on 3 March 2015 and in the Rajya Sabha on 20 March 2015.

In November 2014, the draft of the bill was released for public comments. On 12 January 2015, Mines and Minerals (Development and Regulation) Amendment Ordinance, 2015, was approved by the President of India. It was the 7th ordinance by the National Democratic Alliance government since it took power in May 2014. The bill to replace the ordinance was introduced in the Parliament on 23 February 2015.

On 16 May 2014, the Supreme Court of India cancelled licences of 26 mines in Odisha state. These mines were being operating even though the state had not given them renewal leases. The state was given 6 months to resolve the issues. During this period, Odisha renewed 8 leases. On 6 January 2015, the Government of Odisha decided to auction its remaining non-coal mining leases awaiting renewal. The state was granted 2 more months on 23 February to decide. However, introduction of the bill delayed Odisha's plans of auction.

The amendment seeks to introduce a system of auctions to allocate mining licenses. A fixed percentage to the revenue of any mine will be allocated to development of the area around it, to be called a District Mineral Foundation. The state government will set the rates and it will be in addition to the royalty. A National Mineral Exploration Trust will be set up to explore and promote non-coal minerals. It will have a starting fund of ₹500 crore and will be funded by a 2% levy from mining license holders.

The licences will have a validity of 50 years, compared to the previous 30 years. There will be no renewal of licences, only re-auction. The bill contains a new license for prospecting-cum-mining, replacing a two-stage process. The mining and prospecting-cum-mining licences may be transferred to another party by notifying the state government. The state government may charge a fees for such transfers. Notified minerals like iron ore, limestone, manganese, and bauxite, will not require a prospecting licence. The mining licence will be auctioned. For non-notified minerals, a prospecting-cum-mining licence will be required.

The amendment will make illegal mining, trespassing and violation of norms, cognisable offences punishable by 2 years imprisonment and/or fine. The state government will be allowed to set up special courts for such trials.

==== Criticism ====
In January 2015, after the ordinance was signed, a mining industry lobby group Society of Geo-scientists and Allied Technologists (SGAT) said that the prospecting-cum-mining was useless as no one would apply for such a licence unless they had found a proven reserve by prospecting first.

In March 2015, during the session in which the bill was tabled, the central government did accept the changes proposed some opposition members, some of whom staged a walk-out. Biju Janata Dal (BJD) political party of Odisha said that the bill infringes on the rights of state governments. The view was supported by Indian National Congress and All India Trinamool Congress party. Kariya Munda of BJP said that provisions for the tribals displaced by mines should be made. Tathagata Satapathy of BJD also voiced similar concerns. The period of validity of licences was criticised as being too long at 50 years.

=== 2016 ===
The Union Cabinet of India approved amendments in March 2016. The amendment will allow transfer of captive mining leases not granted through auction. Transfer of captive mining leases, granted otherwise than through auction, would allow mergers and acquisitions of companies and facilitate ease of doing business for companies to improve profitability and decrease costs of the companies' dependent on supply of mineral ore from captive leases. The transfer provisions will also facilitate banks and financial institutions to liquidate stressed assets where a company or its captive mining lease is mortgaged.

=== 2024 ===
The Supreme Court bench of nine members ruled that taxation powers on minerals and ores is exclusive domain of state governments. However, Parliament can impose upper bar to limit the taxation by states. MMDR Act is nothing to do with tax collection by the Union. It also ruled that royalty, which is in the domain of states, is not a tax . The power of states' taxation can extend on atomic minerals and dangerously inflammable resources (oil, natural gas, etc) covered in non-taxation (general) entries 6 and 53 of Union List respectively. However, the verdict while interpreting entry 54 of the union list, has not clarified what is public interest and when or how long it is to be applied.

== See also ==
- Mining in India
- List of acts of the Parliament of India
