= Ramnagar, Udhampur =

Town in India

Ramnagar Naggar
- Municipality Town
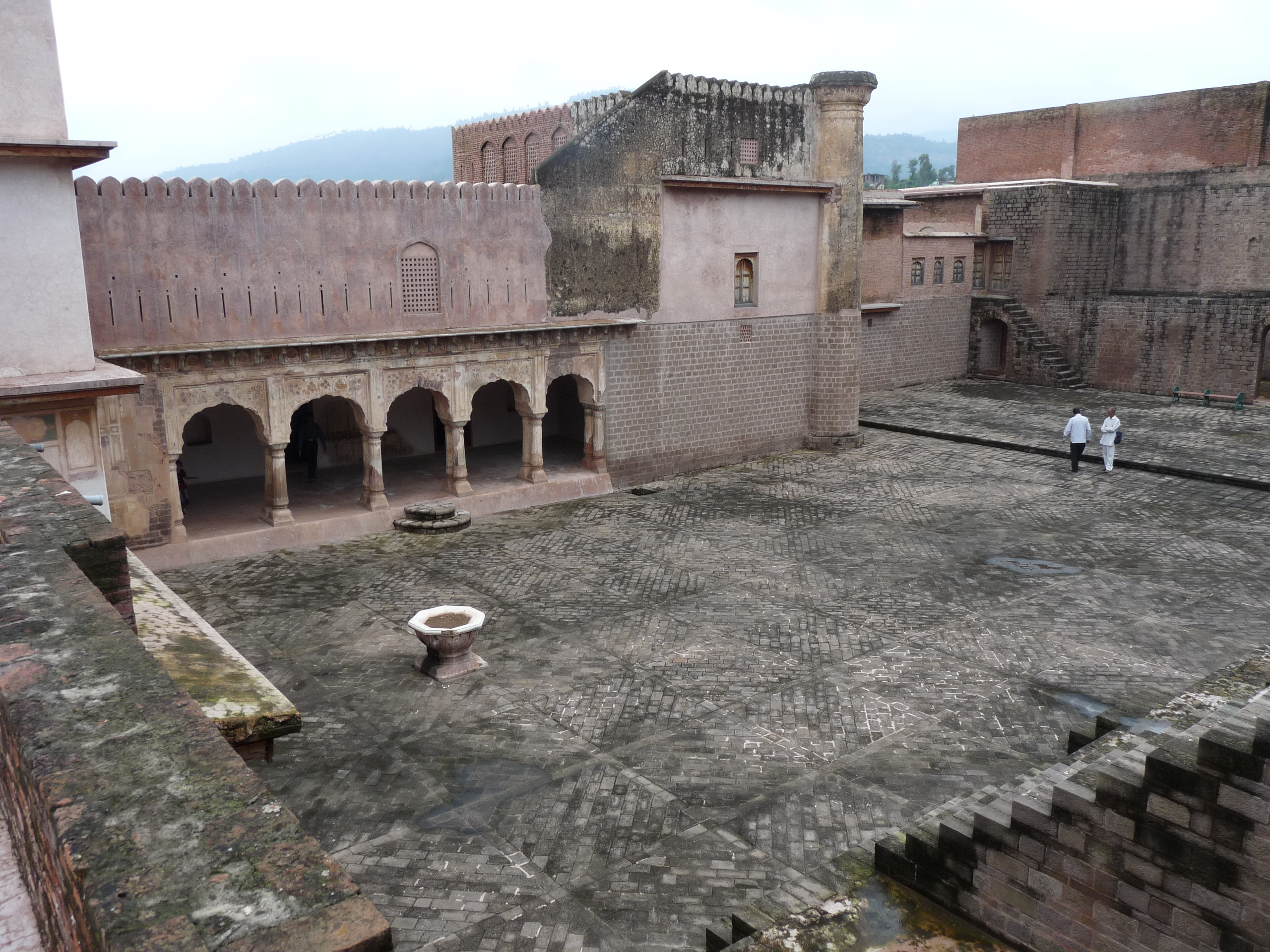
- Icon of Ramnagar (Ram Singh Palace)

- Location in Jammu and Kashmir, India Ramnagar (India)
- Coordinates: 32.82°N 75.32°E
- Country: India
- Union Territory: Jammu and Kashmir
- District: Udhampur
- Established: 1200
- Founder: King Ram Singh
- Named for: King Ram Singh

Government
  - Type: Indian gov
  - Body: Jammu And Kashmir Government
  - MLA: Sunil Bhardwaj
- Elevation: 601 m (1,972 ft)

Population (2001)
  - Total: 6,776

Language
  - Local: Dogri
- Time zone: UTC+5:30 (IST)
- PIN: 182119-24
- Telephone code: 01990
- Vehicle registration: JK 14
- Website: udhampur.nic.in

Ramnagar is a town and notified area committee in Udhampur District in the Indian union territory of Jammu and Kashmir.

== Renowned Personalities ==
Padma Shri Romalo Ram

Padma Shri Prof Vishwamurti Shastri

== Ramnagar Town ==
Ramanagar is a historical small town situated in Udhampur District of Jammu and Kashmir. Ramnagar is named after its last ruler, King Ram Singh of Ramanagar. The King' Palace is also in the town. It has been taken over by Archeological Survey of India for maintenance and preservation. Inside the palace there is one sheesh mahal or a kind of hall where we can still see the painting of different types some are of the queens. Ramnagar is mostly a hilly area. Seoz glaciers, Samna Banj hill and gandh top are some of the very high altitude areas. Main attractions of Ramnagar are:

- Pingla Mata Shrine
- Ramnagar Palace
- Ramnagar fort
- Chountra mata Shrine
- Devi bani Manawal
- Narsingh mandir Ramnagar
- Seoz glaciers and adjacent glaciers
- Dudu Basantgarh (hill station)
- Raja Ram Singh Glass Palace ( Sheesh Mehal )
- Akshardham Cave

Ramnagar sits on the Mansa Devi Nallah, a tributary of the Tawi River that flows through Jammu. It is 27 km off the Udampur-Dhar-Pathankot road. The 19th-century palace, Rani's Samadhi (mausoleum) and the impressive fortress are all under the care of the ASI. It is also the place with highest rainfall in Jammu and Kashmir

== History ==
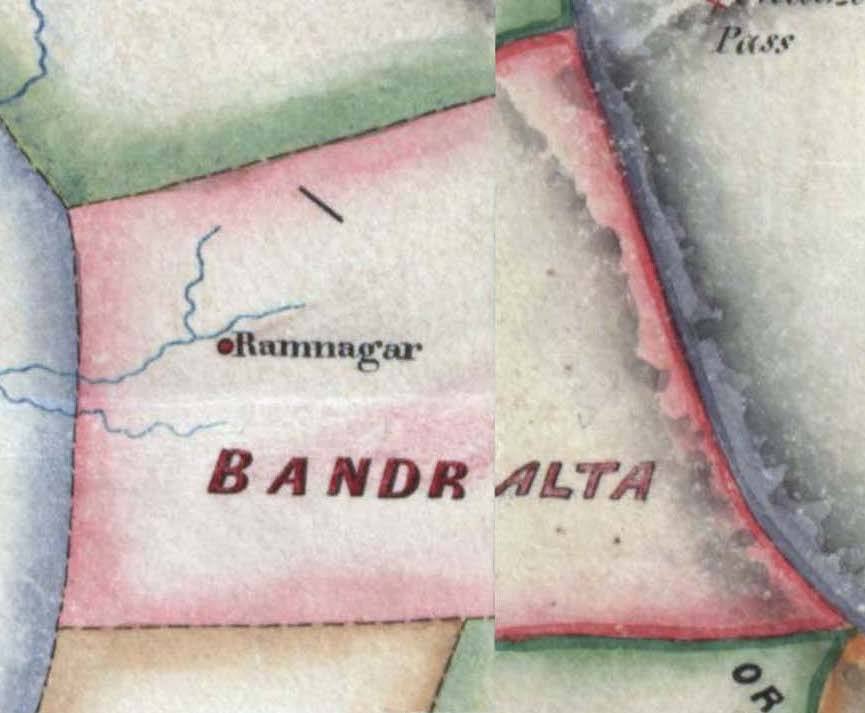
Detail of the territory of Bandralta from a map of the various Hill States of the Punjab Hills region, copied in 1852.

Ramnagar town was once the capital of the Bandralta State whose last king, Bhupendra Dev of Bandral Rajput Dynasty, was ousted in 1821 by Sikh forces and retired into obscurity near Ambala in today's Haryana state. Ramnagar's 19th-century palace complex consisting of three sections was built by Rajput Raja Suchet Singh (ruled 1822 to 1844), brother of Jammu Raja Gulab Singh - a prominent Dogra warrior in the campaign to oust Bhupendra Dev, and by Ram Singh, son of Raja Ranbir Singh.

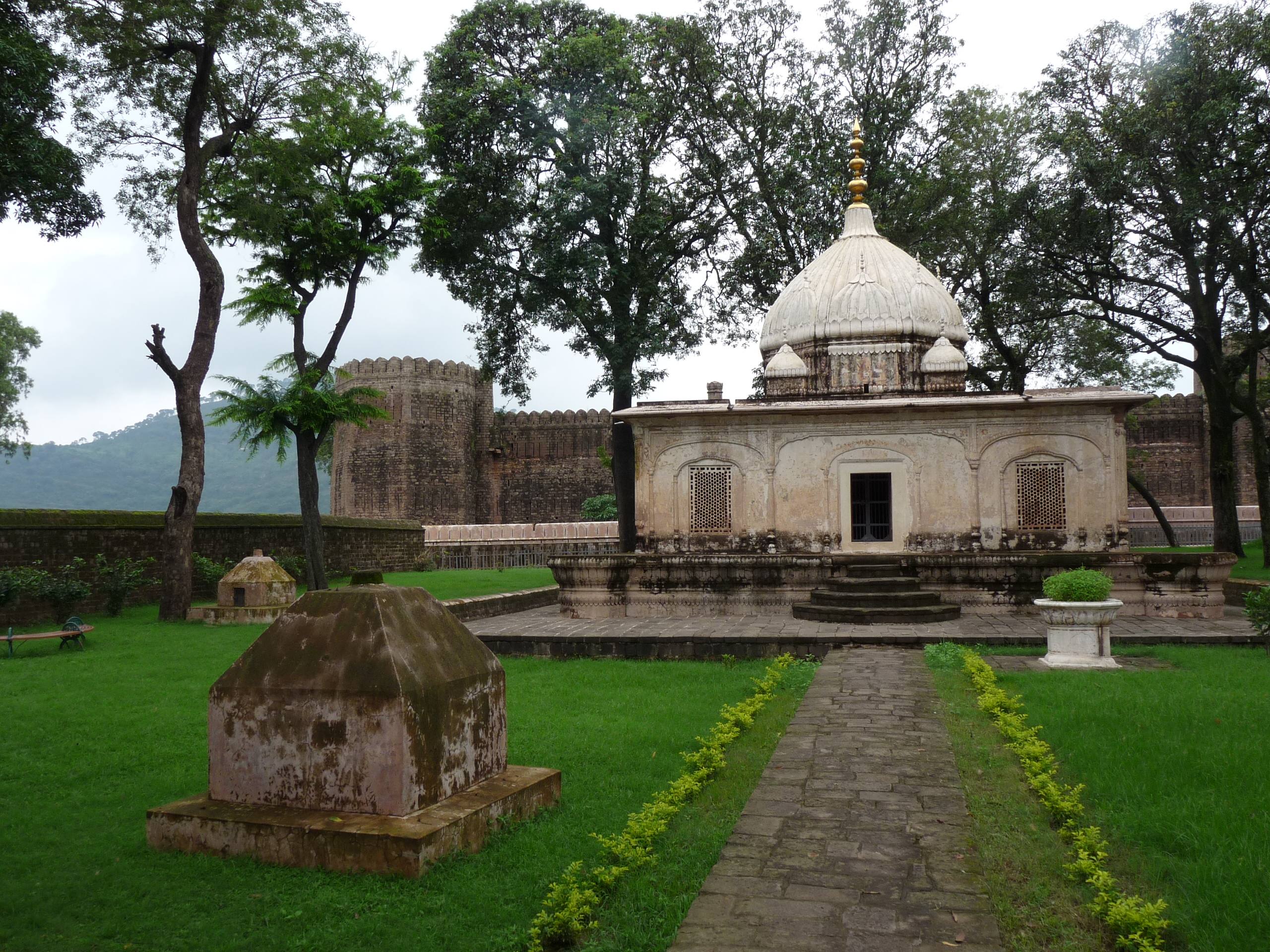
Ramnagar Fort behind the small mausoleum that commemorates the spot on which Raja Suchet Singh's widow performed sati

== Geography of Ramnagar Tehsil ==
Ramnagar is located at 32.82°N 75.32°E. It has an average elevation of 828 metres (2716 feet). Ramnagar is hilly and roughly 90% forested aleit with scrubby, secondary growth in many parts. Local attractions include the pilgrimage sites of Chountra Mata to each of which a Akhand Jyoti is carried on the eve of Navratra (which is scheduled twice a year). This yatra (pilgrimage) is carried with great fervour and dedication towards Maa Durga and Maa Kali. These pilgrimages are traditionally performed on foot though a motorable road is now under construction to Chontra Mata.

Other points of interest include Marhada Mata, Gurlang, Seoz Glaciers, the Samna Manj range, and the Shri Narsing Ji Maharaj temple in central Ramnagar.

== Demographics ==
Ramnagar is a Municipal Committee city in district of Udhampur, Jammu and Kashmir. The Ramnagar city is divided into 13 wards for which elections are held every five years. The Ramnagar Municipal Committee has population of 6,292 of which 3,237 are males while 3,055 are females as per report released by Census of India 2011.

The population of children aged 0-6 is 748 which is 11.89% of total population of Ram Nagar (MC). In Ram Nagar Municipal Committee, the female sex ratio is 944 against state average of 889. Moreover, the child sex ratio in Ram Nagar is around 894 compared to Jammu and Kashmir state average of 862. The literacy rate of Ram Nagar city is 81.64% higher than the state average of 67.16%. In Ram Nagar, male literacy is around 87.33% while the female literacy rate is 75.65%.

Ramnagar Municipal Committee has total administration over 1,330 houses to which it supplies basic amenities like water and sewerage. It is also authorized to build roads within Municipal Committee limits and impose taxes on properties coming under its jurisdiction.

== Religion ==
Hindu 96.27%, Muslim 3.31%, Sikh 0.03%,

== Ramnagar Specialities ==
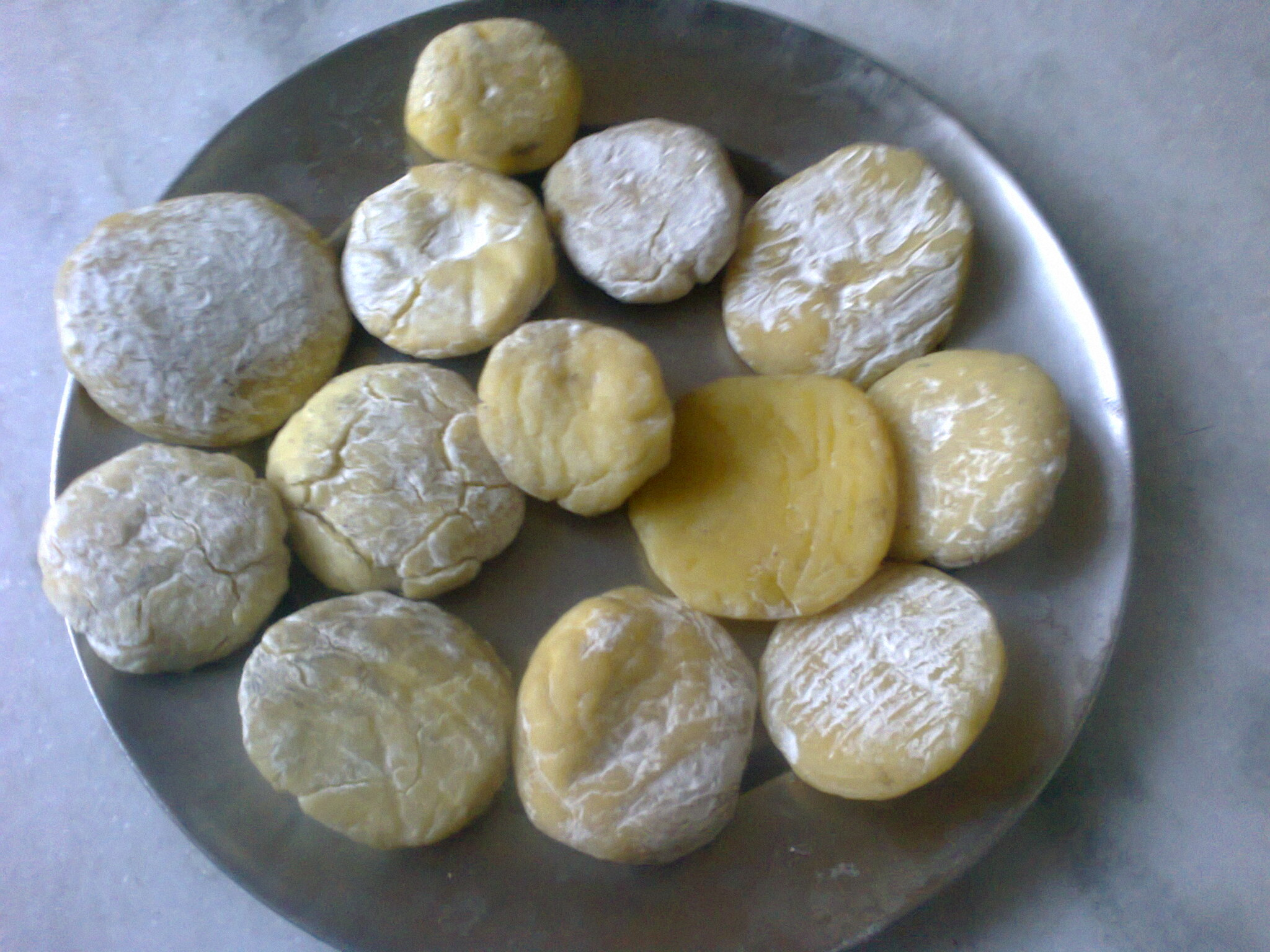
Famous Kalaadi of Ramnagar

Ramnagar is known for its Golgappas (Pani Puri), Chocolate (Barfi), Sund (panjeeri), Patisa and its exotic local food – Rajma-rice (served with chutney made from dried seeds of pomegranate) is one of the cuisines of Ramanagar. Another speciality of Ramnagar is Kalaadi Kulcha It is a type a cheese usually consumed with bread and tea and Kalari cheese, which is a variety of processed cheese. Kalaadi, specially made in the Ramnagar district of Jammu province is considered to be the best in quality all over the state.

Dogra cuisines include Ambal (sweet-salty vegetable made of pumpkin), Khatta Maas, Kulthein di Dal (a Dogra Pulse (legume)), Dal Patt, Maa da Madra, Rajma, Auriya and Kalari (authentic Dogra cheese). Pickles typical of Jammu are made of Kasrod, Girgle, Mango with Saunf, Zimikand, Tyaoo, Seyoo, and Potatoes. Auriya is a dish made with Potatoes. During weddings, it is typical to make Kayoor (another cuisine served with sweet curd), Sund (sweet dish made of dry-fruits) and Sewian (buur).

== Schools and Institutions ==
Bhartiya Vidya Niketan Kirmoo, Rising Pillars Public High School, Bhartiya Vidya Mandhir High School, Keshav Vidya Kendar High School, Emmanuel Mission High School, National Public High School, Government Higher Secondary School, Government Girls High School and Government Middle School are some famous Schools Of Ramnagar.

Government Degree College, Ramnagar
The college is located at the Thaplal village at a distance of about 41 km from Udhampur. The college was established in the year 2005, having area of about 300 kanals, providing a quiet and serene view and ideal for study and contemplation. The institution is affiliated to University of Jammu and recognized by UGC under section 2(f) & 12(b) of UGC Act 1956.

Narsing Dev Institute of Nursing & Paramedical Sciences Ramnagar is the first Paramedical Institute in the Town and is registered under the Paramedical Council of Jammu and Kashmir.

Another Paramedical college in Ramnagar is Ramnagar College for Nursing And Medical Education.

== Notable personalities ==
- Padma Shri Romalo Ram
- Padma Shri Professor Dr. Vishwamurti Shastri
- Sahitya Akademi Awardee Sh. Om Sharma Jandriari

== See also ==
- Battle of Ramnagar
- Gandh Top
