= One Love Party =

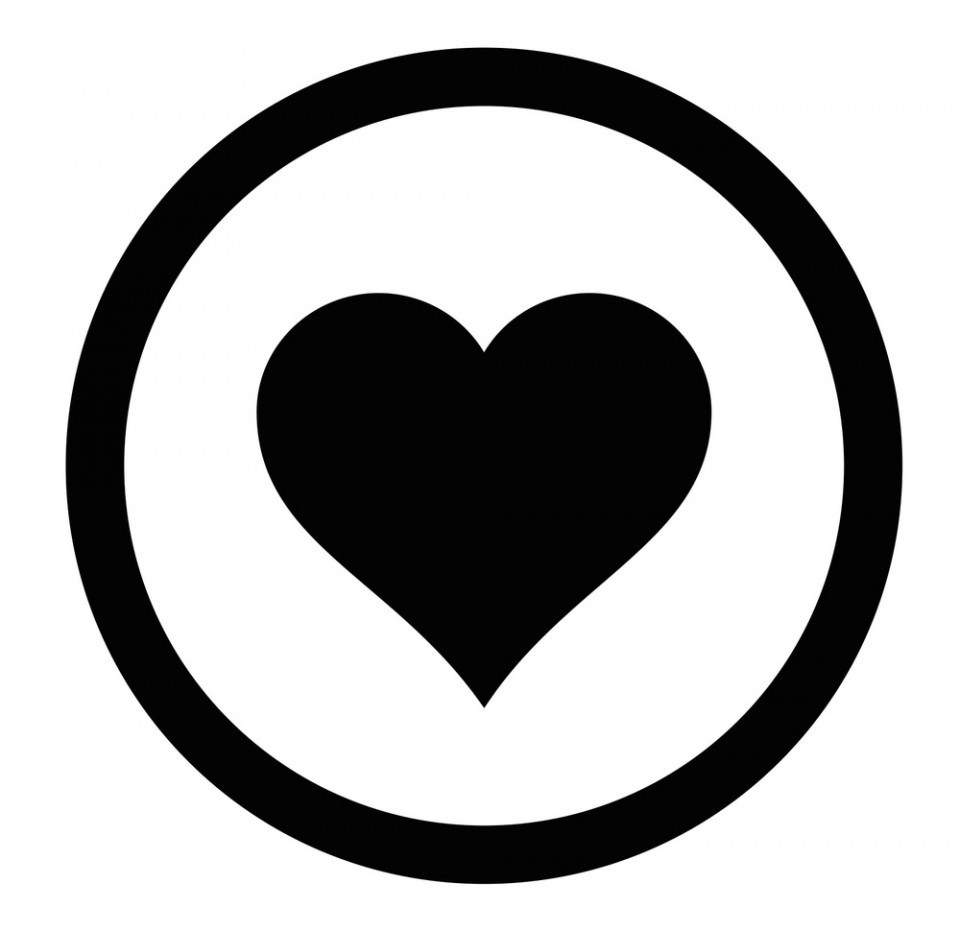
- Founded: 12 October 2015
- Dissolved: 19 December 2017
- Ideology: Techno-progressivism
- Colours: Black and white

Website
- http://www.oneloveparty.eu

The One Love Party was a minor political party in the United Kingdom that identified itself as techno-progressive. The party campaigned for clean air and a federal union of the world. It was founded in 2015 and its first contest was in the 2016 London mayoral election. The party was led and founded by Ankit Love, a musician and film maker and son of Indian politicians Jay Mala and Bhim Singh.

It was statutorily deregistered on 19 December 2017. Love continues to stand in elections as an independent candidate.

== History ==
The One Love Party was founded in Hackney, London by Ankit Love and his friend from Cambridge University, Finn Grant. The party was set up in a dormitory room at a youth hostel.

The One Love Party was registered with the Electoral Commission on 12 October 2015. In 2016, Pax Brown became the party's general-secretary.

In May 2016, Love stood in the London mayoral election and was the youngest candidate to do so. His campaign focussed on London's housing crisis and air pollution in the capital. Love, who was technically homeless during the campaign, claimed not to have spent more than "a couple of thousand" pounds on the campaign. Nevertheless, Love had almost twice as many Facebook followers as the campaign's frontrunners, Sadiq Khan (Labour) and Zac Goldsmith (Conservative). Love came last with 4,941 first preference votes (0.2%).

Love subsequently stood for the party in the Tooting by-election, which was called after Khan, the constituency's Member of Parliament (MP), was elected as Mayor of London. During the election campaign, Love released a rap video depicting a map in which the Indian state of Jammu and Kashmir is an independent country; such representations are illegal under Indian law. Love obtained 32 votes (0.1%), coming 10th out of 14 candidates.

On 15 September 2016, the party achieved its best electoral result by vote share: French artist Dawa Ma won 494 first-preference votes (1.5%) in the Hackney mayoral by-election, campaigning for a second referendum on the UK's membership in the European Union.

Love stood in the Batley and Spen by-election on 20 October 2016. Love wanted to unite Britain on the air pollution issue, claiming that it would kill 200,000 people in the UK over the next five years. He came last with 34 votes (0.2%).

Emilia Rose Arnò stood for the One Love Party in the Witney by-election, which took place on the same day as the Batley and Spen by-election. Arnò's campaign called for emergency action on air pollution and better youth enfranchisement. She came second to last with 44 votes (0.1%).

Love stood in the Richmond Park by-election on 1 December 2016, using the title of Maharaja Jammu and Kashmir, with plans to reunite India and Pakistan. His vote total of 67 represented 0.1% of those voting. He came seventh out of eight candidates.

In August 2017, Ankit Love and his father Prof. Bhim Singh endured a gun battle after being ambushed by militants in Kashmir valley, during the ongoing insurgency in Jammu and Kashmir.

The One Love Party was statutorily deregistered with the Electoral Commission on 19 December 2017.

Love stood as an independent in the 2023 Rutherglen and Hamilton West by-election, under the name "Prince Ankit Love, Emperor of India", getting 34 votes, and also stood under the same name in the Mid Bedfordshire by-election, two weeks later, getting 27 votes.

Love stood as an independent under the name "Ankit Love Jknpp Jay Mala Post-Mortem" in the 2024 Wellingborough by-election, getting 18 votes.

== Policies ==
The party described itself as "techno-progressive".

The party proposed legalising, licensing and taxing drugs such as cannabis in the hope of ending the war on drugs and reducing violent crime. Love claimed that the prohibition of drugs "was originally based on racism, and it funds all the criminal activity in our society." During the London mayoral campaign, it proposed to do this through municipality-owned licensed dispensaries.

The party called for a vote on the final Brexit deal, which would have enfranchised citizens of the European Union resident in the United Kingdom and 16- and 17-year-olds. Because EU citizens could not vote in it, the party claimed that the Brexit referendum was illegal, violating the Lisbon Treaty and the European Convention on Human Rights.

During the London mayoral election campaign, the party endorsed Terry Farrell's proposal to build six new bridges across the River Thames in order to boost the regeneration of East London and provide 47,000 homes. The party also pledged to introduce "discount travel cards for Londoners" and make higher education free for London residents up to PhD level.

During the Tooting by-election campaign, Love favoured bringing the Crossrail 2 line through Tooting Broadway and voiced his opposition to HS2.

=== Environment ===
The One Love Party's priority issue was air pollution. It campaigned for immediate emergency action to bring fossil fuel emissions to zero by the Civil Contingencies Act 2004 and Royal Prerogative to force all power production, shipping, aviation and automobile companies to convert to only clean energy sources. The party pledged to ban all cars except electric and hydrogen vehicles. Love had previously called for the army to organise a military coup d'état and overthrow David Cameron, then the Prime Minister, on the issue of air pollution.

During the London mayoral election campaign, the party called for a ban on all fossil fuel emissions vehicles from the capital. Love called for the city's cycle superhighways to be suspended from the railway network. The party would have converted all water vessels from bunker fuel to hydrogen fuel, solar or SkySails. The party also pledged to increase the use of driverless electric vehicles, reduce the cost of installing solar panels in residential homes, adopt electric and hydrogen-powered buses, scrap the Garden Bridge project, cancel the Silvertown tunnel project, revive the Thames' eel population and investigate the potential of new moorings. Love also called for adverts for cars to be banned in the same way as adverts for cigarettes. During the Hackney mayoral by-election campaign, the party called for a monument to remember the victims of air pollution akin to a war memorial.

=== Technology ===
In agreement with its techno-progressive philosophy, the party supported the expansion of drones, driverless cars, robotic technology and artificial intelligence, stating that these would make more efficient use of scarce resources even if they increased unemployment.

The One Love Party believed in an accelerated program of space exploration, including the colonisation of Mars and Venus and the mining of asteroids to mitigate economic scarcity.

They had pledged to establish a London municipal space program to detect unknown asteroids on a collision course with Earth.

By applying robotic technology and artificial intelligence, the party wished to abolish personal income taxes and introduce a universal basic income for all citizens. During the London mayoral election campaign, the party pledged to introduce Li-Fi networks and use maintenance drones to oversee roadworks and street and building repairs. Love said that he wanted London to be the first major city "to have driverless cars on an everyday basis."

== Electoral performance ==
Summary of One Love Party and later Ankit Love election results
Election	Date	Type	Candidate	Votes	Vote share	Position
2016 London mayoral election (Note: The vote and vote share are for first-preference votes only.)	5 May 2016	Mayoral	Ankit Love	4,941	0.2%	12th of 12
2016 Tooting by-election	16 June 2016	Parliamentary	Ankit Love	32	0.1%	10th of 14
Hackney mayoral by-election, 2016	15 September 2016	Mayoral	Dawa Ma	494	1.5%	5th of 5
2016 Batley and Spen by-election	20 October 2016	Parliamentary	Ankit Love	34	0.2%	10th of 10
2016 Witney by-election	20 October 2016	Parliamentary	Emilia Arno	44	0.1%	13th of 14
2016 Richmond Park by-election (Note: Love contested the by-election under the name of "Maharaja Jammu and Kashmir".)	1 December 2016	Parliamentary	Ankit Love	67	0.2%	7th of 8
2017 general election (Cities of London and Westminster constituency) (Note: Love contested the election under the name of "Ankit Love The Maharaja of Kashmir".)	8 June 2017	Parliamentary	Ankit Love	59	0.2%	7th of 8
2023 Rutherglen and Hamilton West by-election (Note: Love contested the by-election under the name of "Prince Ankit Love, Emperor of India" but without the One Love Party affiliation, instead standing with no description on the ballot paper.)	5 October 2023	Parliamentary	Ankit Love	34	0.1%	13th of 14
2023 Mid Bedfordshire by-election	19 October 2023	Parliamentary	Ankit Love	27	0.1%	12th of 13
2024 Wellingborough by-election (Note: Love contested the by-election under the name of "Ankit Love Jknpp Jay Mala Post-Mortem"", standing with no description on the ballot paper.)	15 February 2024	Parliamentary	Ankit Love	18	0.1%	11th of 11
2024 general election (Kensington and Bayswater constituency) (Note: Love contested the election under the name of "Emperor of India Prince Ankit Love", standing with no description on the ballot paper.)	4 July 2024	Parliamentary	Ankit Love	67	0.2%	10th of 10

== Notes and references ==
Notes
