= Elections in Jammu and Kashmir =

Overview of elections in the Indian union territory of Jammu and Kashmir

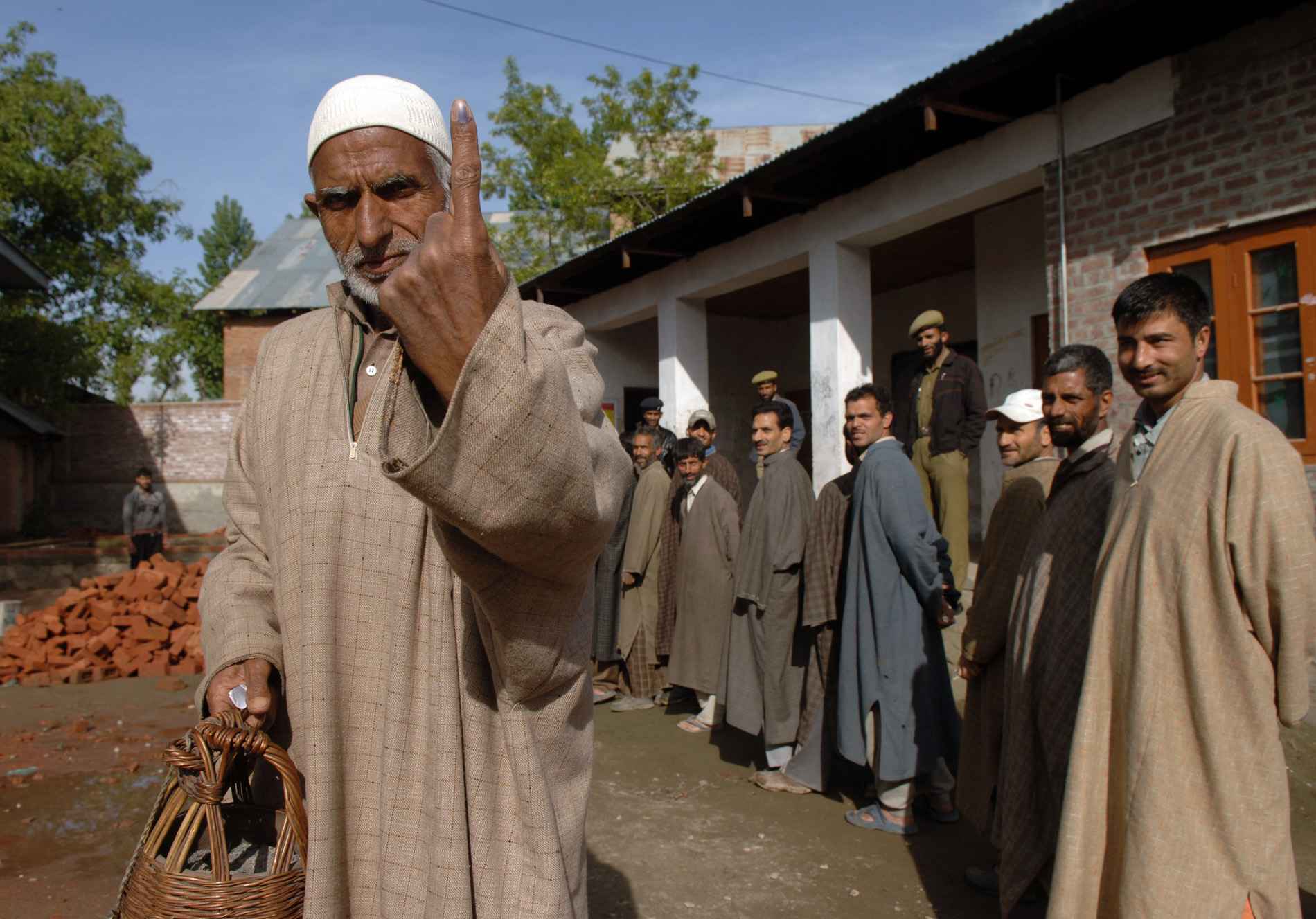
A voter coming out after casting his vote from a polling booth of Budgam during the 4th Phase of General Election 2009 on 7 May 2009. (The raised finger indicates the indelible ink from voting)

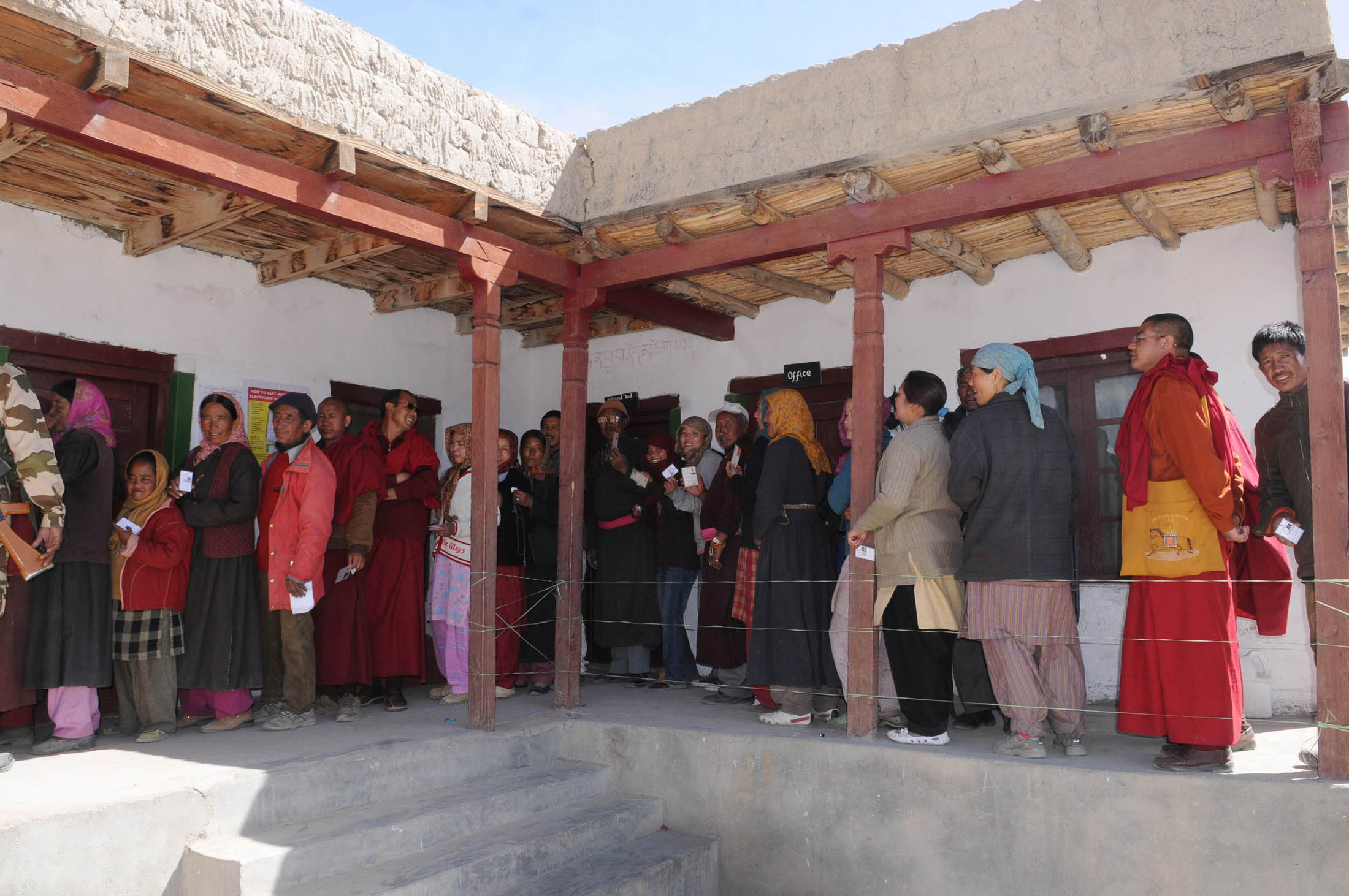
Voters in a queue at a polling booth near Thiksey Monastery in Ladakh, JK, during the 2009 Indian general election

Elections in the Union Territory of Jammu and Kashmir are conducted in accordance with the Constitution of India to elect the representatives of various bodies at national, state and district levels including the 114 seat (90 seats + 24 seats reserved for Pakistan-administered Kashmir) unicameral Jammu and Kashmir Legislative Assembly and the Parliament of India. The first elections in the Union Territory of Jammu and Kashmir took place between 28 November and 19 December 2020 in the form of by-elections to District Development Councils and municipal and panchayat level bodies. A fresh delimitation process for assembly constituencies began in February–March 2020.

Post 2019, Jammu and Kashmir had 90 assembly constituencies and 5 lok sabha constituencies. Also, the state legislature became unicameral as the state legislative council was dissolved.

Legislative assembly elections in the state have been held 11 times since 1951 whereas Parliamentary elections have been held 12 times since 1967. Municipal elections in the state have been held four times since 1947, with the October 2018 elections being the fifth time they were held. Before becoming a state, Praja Sabha were held, with the first Praja Sabha election in 1934.

Prior to 2019, Jammu and Kashmir National Conference (JKNC), Jammu & Kashmir People's Democratic Party (PDP), Bharatiya Janata Party (BJP) and Indian National Congress (INC) had been the dominant political parties in the state of Jammu and Kashmir. But from 1996 onwards the vote share of Bharatiya Janata Party has increased in the parliamentary elections for the state, from 12.45% in 2008 to 23% in 2014 and to 25% in 2024.

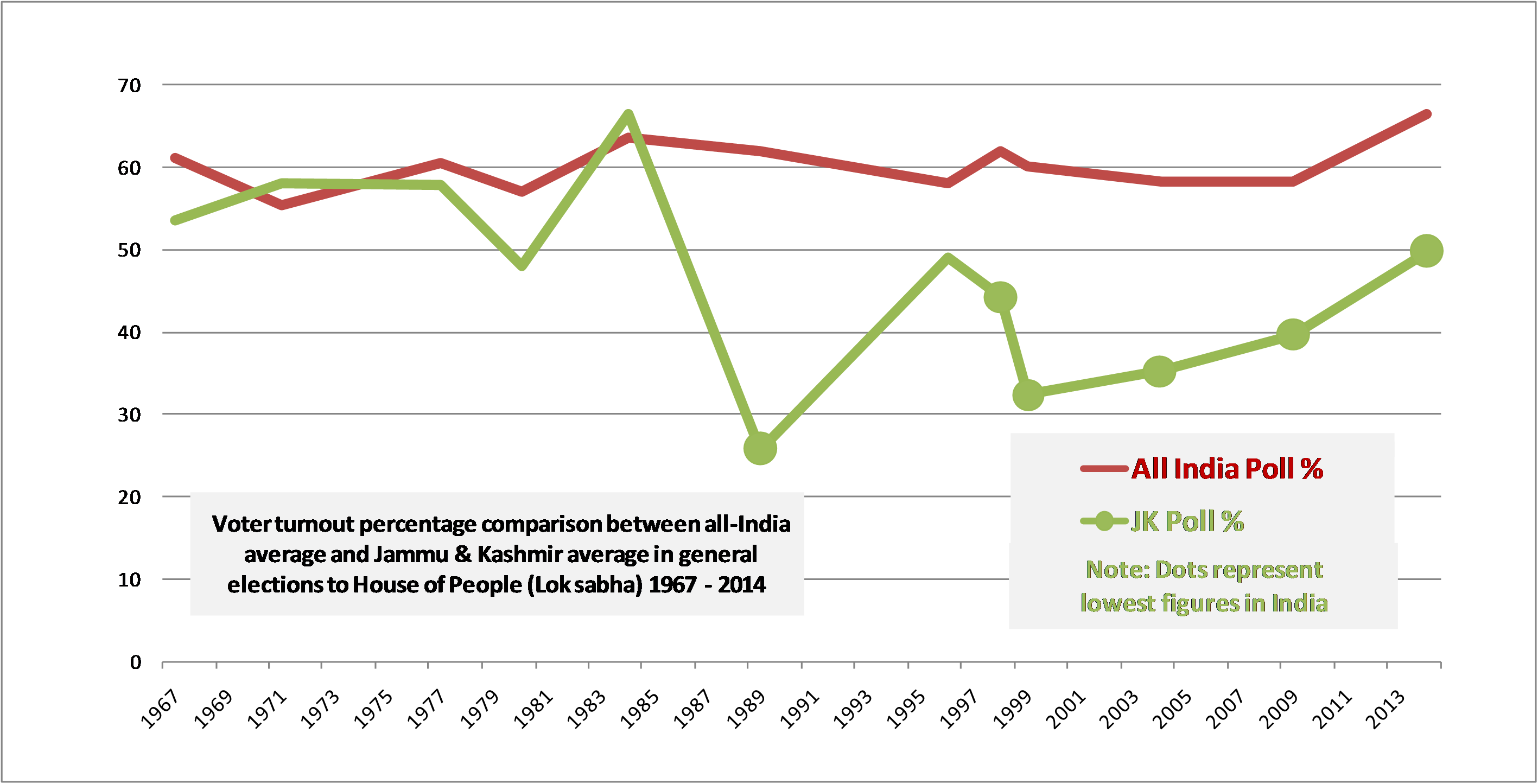
Comparison between voter turnout trends (in percentages) for the elections to the Lok Sabha (House of the People) of India between 1967 and 2014 for Jammu & Kashmir and India. Jammu & Kashmir has had the lowest voter turnout for any state in India in 6 of the 12 Lok Sabha elections it has been a part of.

The dominant parties post the 2024 election are the Jammu and Kashmir National Conference and the Bharatiya Janata Party. The popularity of JKPDP and Congress has reduced over the years and their seats in the assembly are now in single digits.

== Background ==
=== Princely state of Jammu and Kashmir electoral system ===
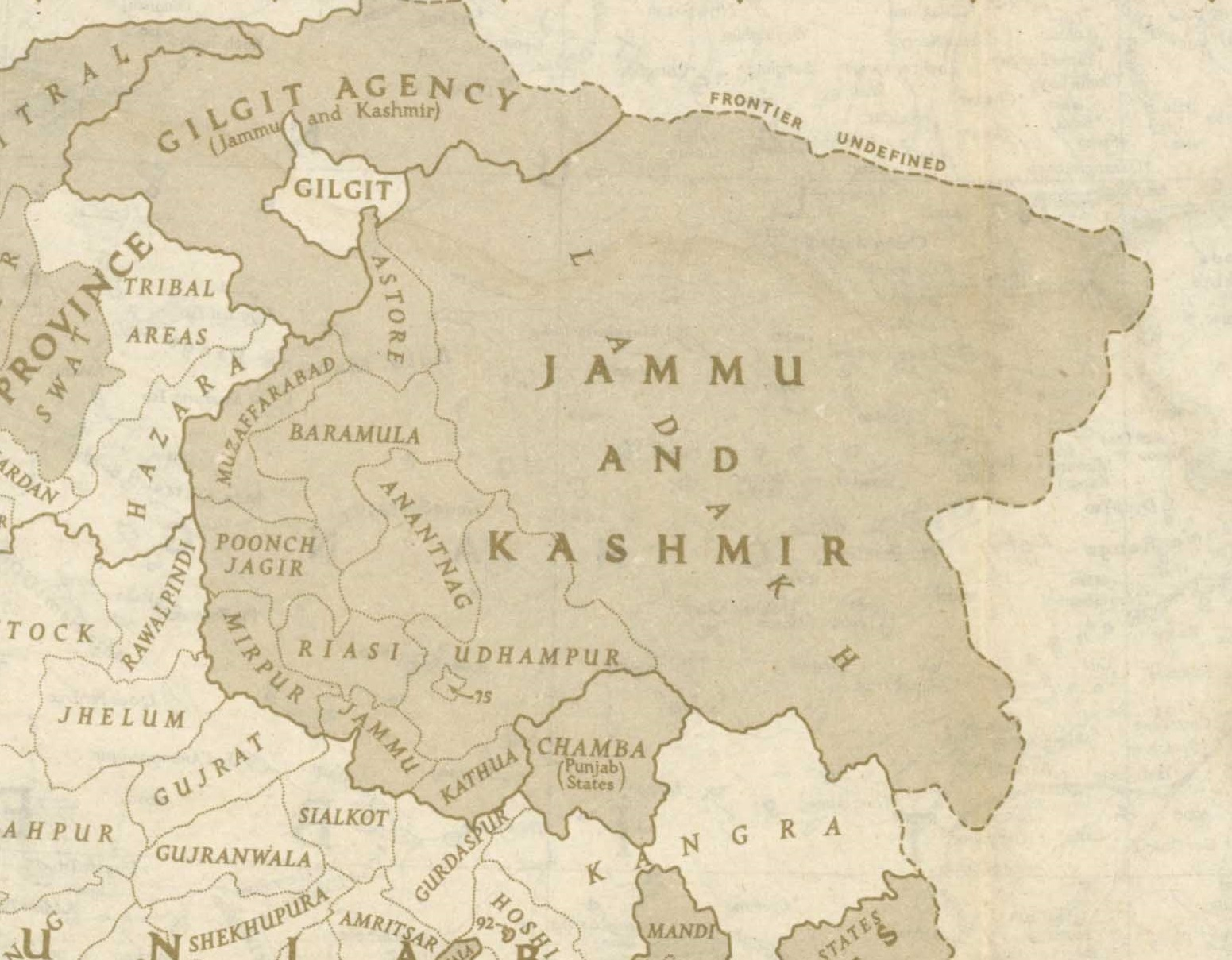
Map of Jammu and Kashmir at the end of British Raj (National Geographic, 1946)

In 1932, a Franchise Committee was set up to frame those who would vote as adult suffrage was considered impractical and unfeasible. The committee fixed the minimum voting age at 21 years. For women voters it was decided that those women who had passed middle school or higher could vote, while for males the criteria were broader and included village officials, religious representatives, retired or pensioned officers, lawyers, doctors, schoolmasters etc. were given franchise. Only a state subject would qualify to vote and British Indians were not allowed. In general, the measure of qualification to vote was the possession of property. Those grazing livestock were also enfranchised. For those standing the election the minimum age was 25 years of age and would include only those who were literate in Urdu.

The services of Ivo Elliot, a retired Indian Civil Services officer, were utilized from 1933 onwards. Under him the princely state was delimited, the election method was set up, and the population was made aware of the electoral process. He divided the territory into 33 constituencies. 138 polling stations for rural constituencies were set up, 32 in Srinagar and 6 in Jammu. 76 nominations were received. Coloured box or symbol system as suggested by the Lothian Committee in British India was utilized.

The Praja Sabha (the Legislative Assembly at the time) was to have 75 members, of which 33 would be elected members (for the 33 constituencies), 12 would be officials, and 30 nominated members. (14 members were nominated as it was not possible to conduct elections in some places such as Ladakh and Gilgit due to the territorial expanse; and the remaining 16 would be nominated as State Councilors). In effect, the elected members chosen through the popular vote would be in the minority in the Legislative Assembly.

=== State of Jammu and Kashmir electoral system ===
There were six Parliamentary Constituencies (Lok Sabha Constituencies) in the state.

There were 87 assembly constituencies in Jammu and Kashmir

The Constitution of India gives power to the Election Commission of India to oversee the establishment of the electoral roles as well as organize the elections to both the Legislative Assembly and Legislative Council in Jammu and Kashmir.

Delimitation has taken place in the state in 1963, 1973 and 1995. The last delimitation in 1995 was based on the 1981 census. Following the 1995 delimitation the number of seats was increased from 76 to 87 (and an additional 24 seats reserved for areas under Pakistan).

Elections to elect all the 111 members of the Legislative Assembly is based universal adult suffrage from people among the state constituencies. The Legislative Council (Vidhan Parishad) of Jammu and Kashmir has 36 members. Out of these 22 members are elected according to a "system of proportional representation by means of the single transferable vote", 6 members are elected from among members municipal council, town area committees, notified area committees, Panchayats and other bodies.

Panchayat elections which are held for sarpanch and panch constituencies as part of the Panchayati Raj system in the state are held according to the provisions in the Jammu and Kashmir Panchayati Raj Act 1989. The authority to form the 'Panchayat Electoral Rolls' and to the conduct Panchayat elections are given to the Chief Electoral Officer, Jammu and Kashmir. Municipal elections in Jammu and Kashmir are conducted on the basis of the Jammu and Kashmir Municipal Act 2000.

=== Union territory of Jammu and Kashmir electoral system ===
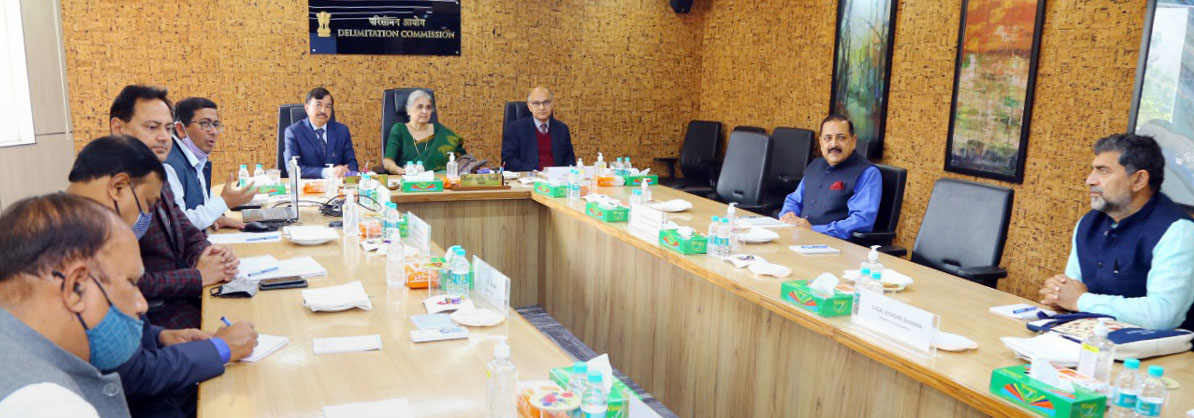
Chairperson of Delimitation Commission, Retd. Justice Ranjana Prakash Desai along with Union Minister Jitendra Singh at a meeting on the delimitation process of UT of JK, in February 2021.The Chief Election Commissioner, Sushil Chandra and others present.

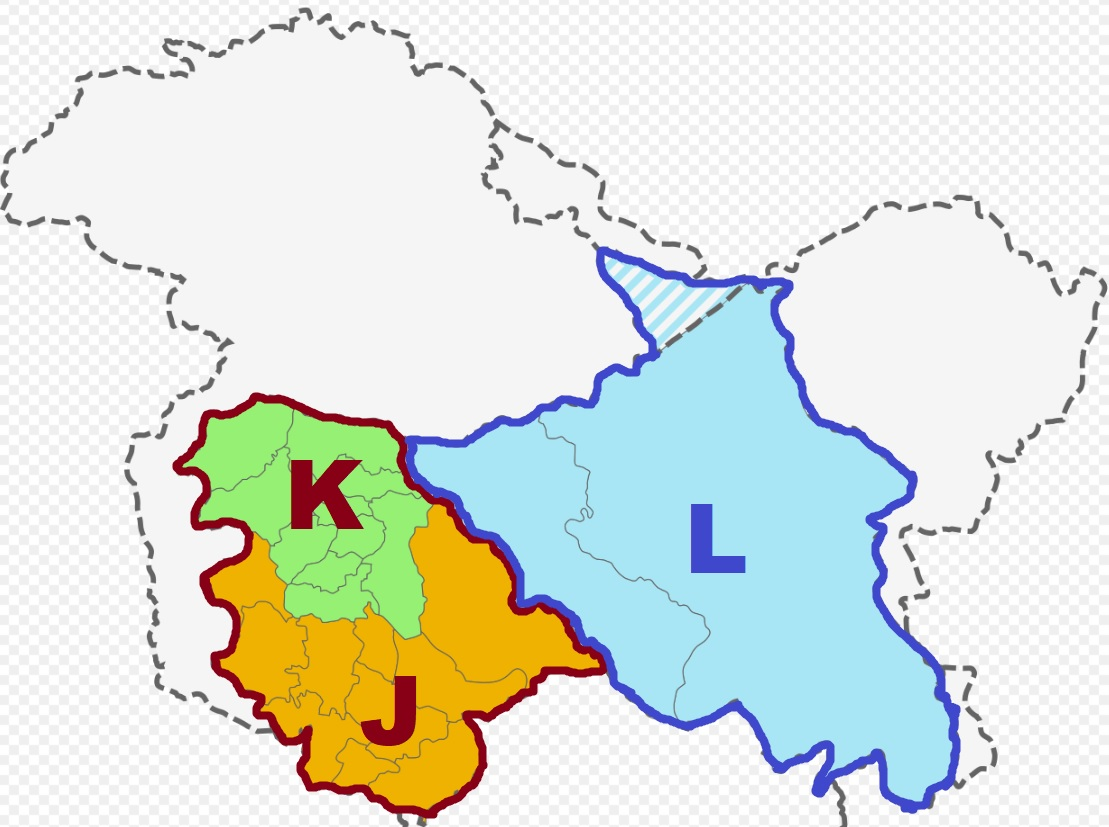
Jammu and Kashmir union territory (J and K) is bordered in carmine colour. Ladakh union territory (L) is bordered in blue colour.

A new delimitation process for the assembly constituencies of the Union Territory began in February–March 2020. It increased the strength of the elected members in the legislative assembly from 87 to 90. The COVID-19 pandemic in India as well as political participation issues delayed the progress. On 24 June 2021, Prime Minister Modi met with political leaders from the region signaling a renewed effort with the delimitation process. The Delimitation Commission is chaired by retired Supreme Court of India Justice Ranjana Prakash Desai. The delimitation is based on the 2011 census of India and is being undertaken as per the amended Delimitation Act, 2002 and the Jammu and Kashmir Reorganisation Act, 2019. There are 280 District Development Council (DDC) seats in the union territory equally divided between the Jammu and Kashmir regions. In each of the 20 districts of the union territory there are 14 constituencies.

== Major political parties ==
This list includes state parties as well as national parties.

=== National parties ===
- AAP: Aam Aadmi Party
- BJP: Bharatiya Janata Party
- BSP: Bahujan Samaj Party
- CPM: Communist Party of India (Marxist)
- INC: Indian National Congress

=== State parties of Jammu and Kashmir ===
- JKNC: Jammu & Kashmir National Conference, founded 1932
- PDP: Jammu & Kashmir People's Democratic Party, split from INC in 1999
- JKAP: Jammu and Kashmir Apni Party, formed in 2020 and led by Altaf Bukhari
- JKNPP: Jammu and Kashmir National Panthers Party, formed in 1982
- JKPC: Jammu and Kashmir People's Conference, founded in 1978
- JKPM: Jammu & Kashmir People's Movement, formed 2019
- JKWP: Jammu and Kashmir Workers Party, formed in 2020 and led by Mir Junaid

== Lok Sabha elections ==
The state of Jammu and Kashmir has taken part in 12 general elections to the Lok Sabha of India. The first time that Jammu & Kashmir sent elected members to the Lok Sabha was in 1967. Elections were not held in 1990 in Jammu and Kashmir due to insurgency in the region.

The table below shows how the Indian National Congress (INC) and Jammu and Kashmir National Conference (JKNC) have won the most Lok Seats in the state since 1967. Though, since 2019 the JKNC and the BJP have been the two major political parties. JKNC and INC has won the seats 27 times each. The other parties won seats in general elections to the Lok Sabha from Jammu and Kashmir are Jammu & Kashmir People's Democratic Party 4 times, Bharatiya Janata Party 13 times, Janata Dal only 1 time and independent candidates 6 times. After delimitation in 2021, the Anantnag constituency was replaced by the Anantnag-Rajouri constituency and Ladakh Lok Sabha constituency became a separate union territory.

Key for parties

JKNC (27) INC (27) BJP (13) Independent (6) JKPDP (4) JD (1)

Election Year	Winners							
Election Year	Voter turnout (%)	Total	Baramulla	Srinagar	Anantnag / Anantnag-Rajouri	Ladakh	Udhampur	Jammu
Elections in the State of Jammu and Kashmir
1967		INC: 5, JKNC: 1,	INC	JKNC	INC	INC	INC	INC
1971		INC: 5, Independent: 1	INC	IND	INC	INC	INC	INC
1977		JKNC: 3, INC: 1, IND: 1	JKNC	JKNC	INC	INC	INC	IND
1980		JKNC: 3, Congress(I): 1, Congress(U): 1	JKNC	JKNC	JKNC	IND	INC(U)	INC(I)
1984		JKNC: 3, INC: 3	JKNC	JKNC	JKNC	INC	INC	INC
1989		JKNC: 3, INC: 2, IND: 1	JKNC	JKNC	JKNC	IND	INC	INC
1991	Elections Not Held							
1996		INC: 4, BJP: 1, JD: 1	INC	INC	JD	INC	BJP	INC
1998		JKNC: 3, BJP: 2, INC: 1	JKNC	JKNC	INC	JKNC	BJP	BJP
1999		JKNC: 4, BJP: 2	JKNC	JKNC	JKNC	JKNC	BJP	BJP
2004		JKNC: 2, INC: 2, JKPDP: 1, IND: 1	JKNC	JKNC	JKPDP	IND	INC	INC
2009		JKNC: 3, INC: 2, IND: 1	JKNC	JKNC	JKNC	IND	INC	INC
2014	49.72%	BJP: 3, PDP: 3	JKPDP	JKPDP	JKPDP	BJP	BJP	BJP
2019	44.97%	BJP: 3, JKNC: 3	JKNC	JKNC	JKNC	BJP	BJP	BJP
Elections in the Union Territory of Jammu and Kashmir
2024	58.46%	BJP: 2, JKNC: 2, IND: 1	IND	JKNC	JKNC	-	BJP	BJP

== Legislative assembly elections ==
After the Constitution of Jammu and Kashmir was amended, the name Prime Minister of Jammu and Kashmir changed into Chief Minister of Jammu and Kashmir.

Legislative assembly elections in JK (1972–2024): Seat share
Party	Seats won								
Party	2024	2014	2008	2002	1996	1987	1983	1977	1972
JKNC	42	15	28	28	57	40	46	47	-
BJP	29	25	11	1	8	2	0	-	-
INC	6	12	17	20	7	26	26	11	58
JKPDP	3	28	21	16	-	-	-	-	-
CPI(M)	1	1	1	2	1	0	0	0	-
JKNPP	0	0	3	4	1	0	-	-	-
IND	7	3	4	13	2	8	2	4	9
JD	-	-	-	-	5	-	-	-	-
JP	-	-	-	-	-	-	-	13	-
Other parties	2	3	2	3	6	-	1	1	8
Total seats	90	87	87	87	87	76	76	76	75
Ref									

Legislative assembly elections in JK (1934—present)
Year	Election		-	Seats Won	Remarks
Elections in the Princely State of Jammu and Kashmir
1934	Praja Sabha election		-	MC: 16; Liberal Group: 13	The Praja Sabha was to have 75 members, of which 33 would be elected members (for the 33 constituencies), 12 would be officials, and 30 nominated members. Elected members would be in minority in assembly. Sheikh Abdullah's Muslim Conference won all five seats in Srinagar.
1937	Praja Sabha by-election		-		
1938	Praja Sabha election		-		
1947	Praja Sabha election		-		
Year	Election	Chief Minister (Winning Party/Coalition)	Polling %	Seats Won	Remarks
Elections in the Jammu and Kashmir
1951	Constituent Assembly	Sheikh Abdullah (JKNC) 1951-1953 (dismissed); Bakshi Ghulam Mohammad (JKNC) 1953-1957		Total: 75; JKNC: 75	Election malpractice, 13 candidates rejected and Praja Parishad boycotts; all seats unopposed
1957	First Assembly	Bakshi Ghulam Mohammad (JKNC) 1957-1962		Total: 75; JKNC: 69; PP: 5, HM: 1	47 seats unopposed
1962	Second Assembly	Bakshi Ghulam Mohammad (JKNC) 1962-1963; Khwaja Shamsuddin (JKNC) 1963-1964; Ghulam Mohammed Sadiq (INC) 1964-1972		Total: 74; JKNC: 68; PP: 3, independents: 3	33 seats unopposed; allegations of malpractices
1967	Third Assembly	Ghulam Mohammed Sadiq (INC)	58.79%	Total: 75; INC: 60	39 seats unopposed; 118 candidates rejected
1972	Fourth Assembly	Syed Mir Qasim (INC) 1972-1975; Sheikh Abdullah 1975-1977	62.17%	Total: 75; INC: 58; Jamaat: 5; BJS: 3	Plebiscite Front banned; election malpractices
1977	Fifth Assembly	Sheikh Abdullah (JKNC) 1977-1982 (death); Farooq Abdullah (JKNC) 1982-1983	67.19%	Total: 76; JKNC: 47; INC: 11, Janata: 13	free and fair elections
1983	Sixth Assembly	Farooq Abdullah (JKNC) 1983-1984 (dismissed); Ghulam Mohammad Shah (ANC) 1984-1986; Farooq Abdullah (JKNC) 1986-1987	73.24%	Total: 76; JKNC: 46; INC: 26	INC engineered split in JKNC; suppression of protests
1987	Seventh Assembly	Farooq Abdullah (JKNC) 1987-1990 (dismissed); President's rule 1990-1996	74.88%	Total: 76; JKNC: 40, INC: 26; MUF:4; BJP: 2	blatant rigging
1996	Eighth Assembly	Farooq Abdullah (JKNC)	53.92%	Total: 87; JKNC: 57; INC: 7; BJP: 8; JD: 5; BSP: 4	
2002	Ninth Assembly	Mufti Mohammad Sayeed (PDP) 2002-2005; Ghulam Nabi Azad (INC) 2005-2008	43.70%	Total: 87; PDP: 16, INC: 20, JKNC: 28, Panthers: 4 Independents: 13	
2008	Tenth Assembly	Omar Abdullah (JKNC)	61.16 %	Total: 87; JKNC: 28, INC: 17; PDP: 21, BJP: 11	
2014	Eleventh Assembly	Mufti Mohammad Sayeed (PDP) 2015-2016 (death); Mehbooba Mufti (PDP) 2016 - June 2018	65.52 %	Total: 87; PDP: 28; BJP: 25; JKNC: 15; INC: 12	Results announced in December 2014, but new government formed in March 2015, after two months of intense negotiations to form PDP-BJP alliance, with BJP's Nirmal Kumar Singh becoming Deputy CM in the beginning
2024	First Assembly (UT)	Omar Abdullah (JKNC)	63.88 %	Total: 90; JKNC: 42, BJP: 29, INC: 6, PDP: 3	

== Municipal elections in Jammu and Kashmir ==
Municipal elections in Jammu and Kashmir are held for positions to municipal corporations (Urban Local Bodies - ULBs) in the region on the basis of the Jammu and Kashmir Municipal Act 2000. Elections to these positions are based on universal adult franchise in electoral constituencies called wards. Since 1947 municipal elections have been held five times in the state. Before 2018, the last Municipal elections in Jammu and Kashmir were held in 2005.

=== 2018 municipal elections ===
The 2018 local elections were held in the state of Jammu and Kashmir in four phases on 8, 10, 13 and 16 October. Voting was held from 7am to 4pm. The days were declared a public holiday in the region. The total number of wards (electoral constituencies) were 1145 out of which 244 wards (4.7%) were uncontested. Out of a total of around 17 lakh electors, the final state voter turnout was 35.1%, that is 5.97 lakh electors voted. Counting was held on 20 October 2018. Major political parties in the state such as Jammu and Kashmir National Conference (JKNC) and Jammu and Kashmir People's Democratic Party (PDP) boycotted the elections.

There was vast difference between voting turnout for the Urban Local Bodies, with Srinagar Municipal Corporation getting a poll percentage of 1.8% as compared to Ramgarh Municipal Committee getting a poll percentage of 82.6% in the third phase of voting. In certain wards such as Baghat Barzulla (Srinagar Municipal Corporation), out of a total of 11486 electors, only 61 votes were placed (0.53% voter turnout). On the other hand, wards such as Partap Garh (Jammu Municipal Corporation), out of 3583 electors, 2372 votes were placed (66.2% voter turnout).

In the Srinagar Municipal Corporation, out of the 74 wards, Independent candidates won 53 seats, Indian National Congress won 16 seats, Bhartiya Janata Party secured 4 seats and 1 ward went vacant ( no votes were cast on that seat ). In the Jammu Municipal Corporation polls, out of the 75 wards, Bhartiya Janata Party secured 43 seats, Independent candidates got 18 seats and Indian National Congress won 14 seats. In the Leh municipal committee, Congress won all the 13 seats. BJP for the first time in the electoral history of the state, won 60 seats unopposed, winning at least seven municipal committees in Kashmir valley. In Kashmir, 69% of the 598 wards did not require polling.

== Panchayat elections in Jammu and Kashmir ==
Jammu and Kashmir Panchayat elections are held in accordance with the provisions of the Jammu and Kashmir Panchayati Raj Act 1989.

The 2011 the Panchayat elections consisted of 143 blocks, 4130 Sarpanchs and 29719 Panchs. The total electors were 5,068,975 electors out of which over 80% voted in 33,000 polling stations. Before 2011, panchayat elections were held in 2001 after a gap of 23 years.

Year	Dates	Blocks	No of Panchayat Halqas (Sarpanch)	No. of Panch Constituencies	No of Electors	Remarks
2001	December 2000 to March 2001	-	-	10458	-	
2011	13 April 2011 to 30 June 2011	143	4130	29719	5068975	
2018	17 November 2018 to 11 December 2018	316	4483	35029	5854208	
2020	28 November and 19 December	-	-	12153	-	-

=== 2018 Panchayat elections ===
In the run-up to the 2018 Panchayat elections, National Conference (NC) and People's Democratic Party (PDP) announced they would boycott the local elections. Around 12 panchayat houses were set on fire before the elections.

=== 2020 District Development Councils elections ===
District Development Council elections the Union Territory of Jammu and Kashmir took place between 28 November and 19 December along with by-elections for other vacant posts in local bodies. A total of 1,475 candidates contested 280 DDC seats; 296 candidates were women. Ballot papers were being used for the elections instead of EVMs. Results were announced on 22 December 2020.

== 24 seats in legislative assembly not contested ==
The Constitution of Jammu and Kashmir reserved 24 seats in the legislative assembly for areas in Pakistan-administered Kashmir that were not to be contested during elections "until the area of the State under the occupation of Pakistan ceases to be so occupied and the people residing in that area elect their representatives". In 2019, the Government of India retained these provisions during the formation of the Union Territory.

== Administration ==
As of 2026, Sri Sanjeev Kumar is the current chief electoral officer of Jammu and Kashmir.

== Controversies ==
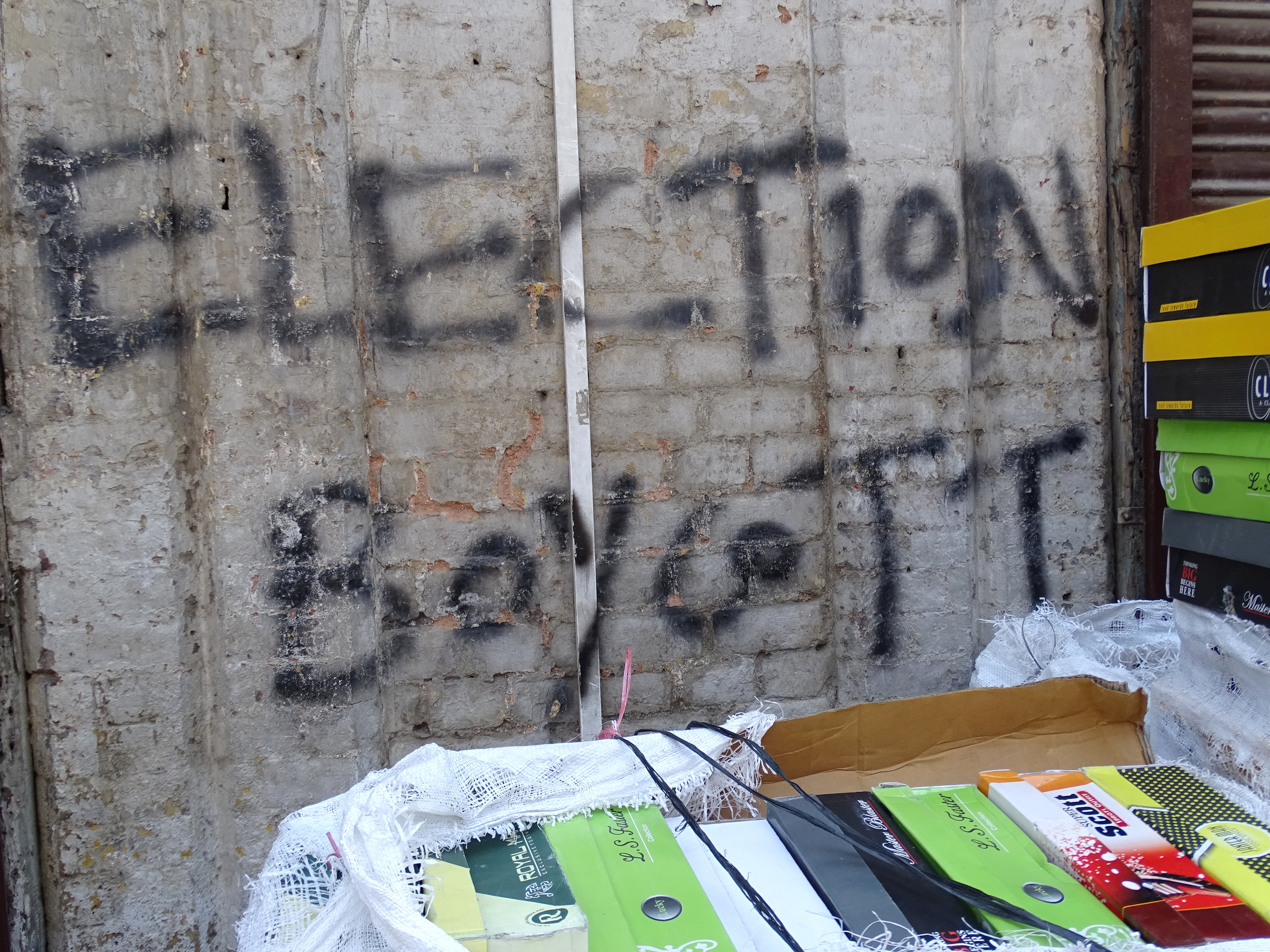
Old City, Srinagar

Election controversies include burning prospective buildings going to be used for elections, such as what happened before the 2018 Panchayat elections in the state. The call to boycott the elections is a common feature among parties in the region, especially the regional parties and separatist groups. Election rigging has also been a criticism, especially during the 1987 Jammu and Kashmir Legislative Assembly election.

== See also ==
- Politics of Jammu and Kashmir
- Mayor of Srinagar

== Bibliography ==
- Behera, Navnita Chadha (2007), Demystifying Kashmir, Pearson Education India, ISBN 978-8131708460
- Bose, Sumantra (2003), Kashmir: Roots of Conflict, Paths to Peace, Harvard University Press, ISBN 0-674-01173-2
- Chowdhary, Rekha (5 October 2015), Jammu and Kashmir: Politics of Identity and Separatism, Routledge, ISBN 978-1-317-41405-6
- Dalal, Sir Barjor (1935), "The Jammu and Kashmir State Assembly: First Session", Asiatic Review, 31: 137–147 – via archive.org
- Hussain, Syed Taffazull (2016), Sheikh Abdullah-A Biography: The Crucial Period 1905-1939. 2016 Edition, Syed Taffazull Hussain, ISBN 978-1-60481-603-7
- Election Commission of India, Statistical Reports of General Election to Lok Sabha. Government of India
- National Informatics Centre. Constitution of Jammu and Kashmir 1956, Government of India
