= 1999 Indian general election in Jammu and Kashmir =

Indian general election in Jammu and Kashmir, 1999
- Sept 5, Sept 11, Sept 18, 4 Oct
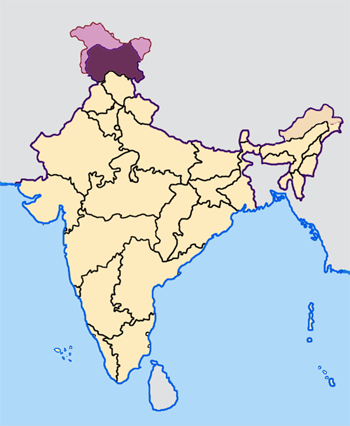
- Jammu and Kashmir

The 1999 Indian general election in Jammu and Kashmir to the 13th Lok Sabha were held for 6 seats. Jammu and Kashmir National Conference won 4 seats and Bharatiya Janata Party won 2 seats.

== Election Schedule ==
Constituency	Polling / Counting Date	Declaration of Result (From)	Declaration of Result (To)
Baramulla	18 September 1999	6 October 1999	8 October 1999
Srinagar	5 September 1999	6 October 1999	6 October 1999
Anantnag	4 October 1999	6 October 1999	8 October 1999
Ladakh	5 September 1999	6 October 1999	7 October 1999
Udhampur	11 September 1999	6 October 1999	7 October 1999
Jammu	11 September 1999	6 October 1999	7 October 1999

== Constituency Details ==
Constituency	Candidates	Electors	Voters	Polling %	Polling Stations
Baramulla	12	763639	212180	27.79	1143
Srinagar	11	854081	101933	11.93	987
Anantnag	19	804911	115243	14.32	994
Ladakh	17	143719	117671	81.88	392
Udhampur	22	1016952	403210	39.65	1387
Jammu	27	1446792	676708	46.77	1610

== List of Candidates ==
Constituency		JKNC		BJP		INC	
#	Name	Party	Candidate	Party	Candidate	Party	Candidate
1	Baramulla	JKNC	Abdul Rashid Shaheen	BJP	Mohd Sultan	Did Not Field	
2	Srinagar	JKNC	Omar Abdullah	BJP	Fayaz Ahamd Bhat	INC	Aga Syed Mehdi
3	Anantnag	JKNC	Ali Muhammad Naik	BJP	Showkat Hussain Ganie	INC	Peerzada Mohammad Syed
4	Ladakh	JKNC	Hassan Khan	BJP	Sonam Paljor	INC	Thupstan Chhewang
5	Udhampur	JKNC	Jagjiwan Lal	BJP	Chaman Lal Gupta	INC	Balbir Singh
6	Jammu	JKNC	Rajinder Singh Chib	BJP	Vishno Datt Sharma	INC	Madan Lal Sharma

== Results ==
=== Results by Party/Alliance ===
Party Name	Popular vote			Seats		
Party Name	Votes	%	±pp	Contested	Won	+/−
BJP	4,95,715	31.56	▲2.92	6	2	Steady
JKNC	4,54,481	28.94	▼7.41	6	4	▲1
INC	2,80,065	17.83	▼1.41	5	0	▼1
BSP	75,943	4.84		2	0	
JKAL	28,889	1.84		3	0	
CPI(M)	15,649	1.00		1	0	
Others	68,593	4.37	Steady	32	0	Steady
IND	1,51,229	9.63		28	0	Steady
Total	15,70,564	100%	-	83	6	-

=== List of Elected MPs ===
Constituency		Winner				Runner-up				Margin	
Constituency		Candidate	Party	Votes	%	Candidate	Party	Votes	%	Votes	%
1	Baramulla	Abdul Rashid Shaheen	JKNC	84,243	43.94	Muzaffar Hussain Baig	IND	48,130	25.10	36,113	18.84
2	Srinagar	Omar Abdullah	JKNC	55,542	57.27	Mehbooba Mufti	IND	18,683	19.26	36,859	38.01
3	Anantnag	Ali Muhammad Naik	JKNC	38,745	37.66	Mufti Mohammad Sayeed	IND	25,253	24.55	13,492	13.11
4	Ladakh	Hassan Khan	JKNC	52,187	45.04	Thupstan Chhewang	INC	50,097	43.24	2,090	1.80
5	Udhampur	Chaman Lal Gupta	BJP	194,678	49.01	Jagjiwan Lal	JKNC	76,371	19.23	118,307	29.78
6	Jammu	Vishno Datt Sharma	BJP	289,412	43.46	Rajinder Singh Chib	JKNC	147,393	22.13	142,019	21.33

== Post-election Union Council of Ministers from Jammu & Kashmir ==
#	Name	Constituency	Designation	Department	From	To	Party
1	Prof. Chaman Lal Gupta	Udhampur	Cabinet Minister	Food Processing Industries	1 Sept 2001	1 July 2002	BJP
1	Prof. Chaman Lal Gupta	Udhampur	MoS	Defence	1 July 2002	22 May 2004	BJP
2	Omer Abdullah	Srinagar	MoS	Commerce and Industry	13 Oct 1999	22 July 2001	JKNC
2	Omer Abdullah	Srinagar	MoS	External Affairs	22 July 2001	23 Dec 2002	JKNC

== See also ==
- Results of the 2004 Indian general election by state
- Elections in Jammu and Kashmir
