= 1989 Indian general election in Jammu and Kashmir =

Elections for Jammu and Kashmir seats in lower house of the Parliament, India

Indian general election in Jammu and Kashmir, 1989
- 22-24 November
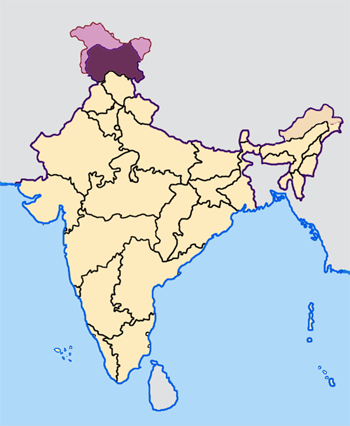
- Jammu and Kashmir

The 1989 Indian general election in Jammu and Kashmir to the 9th Lok Sabha were held for 6 seats. Jammu and Kashmir National Conference won 3 seats, Indian National Congress won 2 seats, and an Independent candidate won 1 seat.

== Constituency details ==
Constituency	Electors	Voters	Polling %
Baramulla	698284	38235	5.48
Srinagar	782715	uncontested	uncontested
Anantnag	736495	37377	5.07
Ladakh	101738	87863	86.36
Udhampur	809465	319326	39.45
Jammu	1026600	584078	56.89

== List of Candidates ==
Constituency		JKNC		INC		JD		BJP	
No.	Name	Party	Candidate	Party	Candidate	Party	Candidate	Party	Candidate
1	Baramulla	JKNC	Saifuddin Soz	Did not contest		Did not contest		Did not contest	
2	Srinagar	JKNC	Mohammad Shafi Bhat	Did not contest		Did not contest		Did not contest	
3	Anantnag	JKNC	Piyare Lal Handoo	Did not contest		Did not contest		Did not contest	
4	Ladakh	Did not contest		INC	P. Namgyal	Did not contest		Did not contest	
5	Udhampur	Did not contest		INC	Dharam Paul	JD	Abdul Rehman	BJP	Baldev Singh
6	Jammu	Did not contest		INC	Janak Raj Gupta	JD	Rajinder Singh Chib	BJP	Chaman Lal Gupta

== Results ==
=== Party-wise results ===
Party Name	Popular vote			Seats		
Party Name	Votes	%	±pp	Contested	Won	+/−
INC	4,07,474	38.95	▲8.72	3	2	▼1
JD	3,14,357	30.05	Steady	2	0	Steady
BJP	74,832	7.15	▲5.44	2	0	Steady
JKNC	71,194	6.81	▼39.36	3	3	Steady
BSP	42,453	4.06	Steady	1	0	Steady
JKNPP	22,625	2.16	▼2.19	1	0	Steady
JP	11,049	1.06	Steady	1	0	Steady
Others	1,718	0.16	Steady	1	0	Steady
IND	1,00,419	9.60	▼7.81	49	1	▲1
Total	10,46,121	100%	-	63	6	-

=== List of elected MPs ===
Constituency		Winner				Runner-up				Margin	
Constituency		Candidate	Party	Votes	%	Candidate	Party	Votes	%	Votes	%
1	Baramulla	Saifuddin Soz	JKNC	35,139	93.79	Sheikh Abdul Rehman	IND	719	1.92	34,420	91.87
2	Srinagar	Mohammad Shafi Bhat	JKNC	SEAT WON UNCONTESTED							
3	Anantnag	Piyare Lal Handoo	JKNC	36,055	97.69	Abdul Rashid Khan	IND	186	0.50	35,869	97.19
4	Ladakh	Mohd. Hassan	IND	45,151	52.65	P. Namgyal	INC	40,612	47.35	4,539	5.30
5	Udhampur	Dharam Paul	INC	127,161	40.66	Abdul Rehman	JD	96,351	30.81	30,810	9.85
6	Jammu	Janak Raj Gupta	INC	239,701	41.82	Rajinder Singh Chib	JD	218,006	38.03	21,695	3.79

== See also ==
- Elections in Jammu and Kashmir
- Results of the 2004 Indian general election by state
