= 1996 Indian general election in Jammu and Kashmir =

Indian general election in Jammu and Kashmir, 1996
- 7 May, 23 May, 30 May
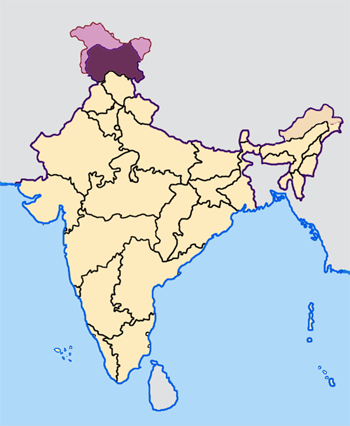
- Jammu and Kashmir

The 1996 Indian general election in Jammu and Kashmir to the 11th Lok Sabha were held for 6 seats. Bharatiya Janata Party won 1 seat, Indian National Congress won 4 seats and Janta Dal won 1 seat.

== Constituency Details ==
Constituency	Candidates Nominated	Electors	Voters	Polling %
Baramulla	15	704601	328688	46.65
Srinagar	17	786301	321928	40.94
Anantnag	23	764670	383861	50.20
Ladakh	13	131402	106347	80.93
Udhampur	47	862236	459456	53.29
Jammu	49	1206499	581314	48.18

== List of Candidates ==
Constituency							
Constituency		INC		BJP		JD	
1	Baramulla	INC	Gh. Rasool Kar	Did not contest		JD	Sheikh Mohd Sadiq
2	Srinagar	INC	Ghulam Mohammad Mir	BJP	Amar Nath Vaishanvi	JD	Farooq Ahmad Anderabi
3	Anantnag	INC	Taj Mohi-Ud-Din	BJP	Sarla Taploo	JD	Mohamad Maqbool
4	Ladakh	INC	Phuntsog Namgyal	BJP	Spalzes Angmo	Did not contest	
5	Udhampur	INC	Janak Raj Gupta	BJP	Chaman Lal Gupta	JD	Devi Dass Thakur
6	Jammu	INC	Mangat Ram Sharma	BJP	Vaid Vishno Dutt	JD	Balwan Singh

== Results ==
=== Results by Party/Alliance ===
Party Name	Popular vote			Seats
Party Name	Votes	%	Contested	Won
INC	5,69,942	27.46	6	4
BJP	3,95,300	19.04	5	1
JD	3,66,074	17.63	5	1
BSP	1,23,591	5.95	2	0
JKPP	99,599	4.80	5	0
AIIC(T)	17,276	0.83	3	0
IND	5,04,098	24.28	84	0
Total	20,75,880	100%	110	6

=== List of Elected MPs ===
Constituency		Winner				Runner-up				Margin	
Constituency		Candidate	Party	Votes	%	Candidate	Party	Votes	%	Votes	%
1	Baramulla	Ghulam Rasool Kar	INC	110,331	36.09	Gh. Nabi Mir	IND	45,350	14.83	64,981	21.26
2	Srinagar	Ghulam Mohammad Mir	INC	55,503	18.63	Farooq Ahmad Anderabi	JD	53,904	18.10	1,599	0.53
3	Anantnag	Mohamad Maqbool	JD	117,221	32.76	Taj Mohi-Ud-Din	INC	59,137	16.53	58,084	16.23
4	Ladakh	Phuntsog Namgyal	INC	54,592	52.10	Qamar Ali Akhoon	IND	44,457	42.43	10,135	9.67
5	Udhampur	Chaman Lal Gupta	BJP	166,206	37.58	Janak Raj Gupta	INC	96,151	21.74	70,055	15.84
6	Jammu	Mangat Ram Sharma	INC	194,228	34.24	Vishno Datt Sharma	BJP	147,495	26.00	46,733	8.24

== Post-election Union Council of Ministers from Jammu & Kashmir ==
#	Name	Constituency	Designation	Department	From	To	Party
1	Maqbool Dar	Anantnag	MoS	Home Affairs	10 July 1996	21 April 1997	JD
1	Maqbool Dar	Anantnag	MoS	Home Affairs	1 May 1997	19 March 1998	JD
2	Saifuddin Soz	Rajya Sabha (Jammu & Kashmir)	Cabinet Minister	Environment and Forests	21 Feb 1997	21 April 1997	JKNC
2	Saifuddin Soz	Rajya Sabha (Jammu & Kashmir)	Cabinet Minister	Environment and Forests	21 April 1997	19 March 1998	JKNC

== See also ==
- Results of the 2004 Indian general election by state
- Elections in Jammu and Kashmir
