= 1967 Indian general election in Jammu and Kashmir =

Indian general election in Jammu and Kashmir, 1967
- 15 February
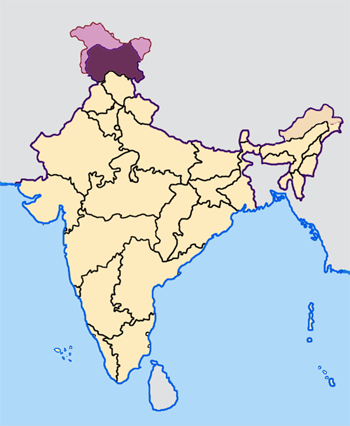
- Jammu and Kashmir

The 1967 Indian general election in Jammu and Kashmir to the 4th Lok Sabha were held for 6 seats. Indian National Congress won 5 seats and Jammu & Kashmir National Conference won Srinagar constituency. It was the first direct election when the MPs from J&K were sent to Lok Sabha. The polling percentage was 53.42%.

== Constituency Details ==
Constituency	Electors	Voters	Polling %
Baramulla	367400	188657	51.35
Srinagar	354364	131997	37.25
Udhampur	418795	253797	60.60
Jammu	440581	297653	67.56

== Results ==
=== Party-wise Results ===
Party Name	Popular vote			Seats		
Party Name	Votes	%	±pp	Contested	Won	+/−
INC	4,25,668	50.52	New entry	6	5	New entry
JKNC	2,10,020	24.92	New entry	4	1	New entry
BJS	1,71,367	20.34	New entry	3	0	Steady
DNC	30,788	3.65	New entry	1	0	Steady
IND	4,781	0.57	Steady	1	0	Steady
Total	8,42,624	100%	-	15	6	-

=== List of Elected MPs ===
Constituency		Winner				Runner-up				Margin	
Constituency		Candidate	Party	Votes	%	Candidate	Party	Votes	%	Votes	%
1	Baramulla	Shaikh Mohammed Akbar	INC	101,769	55.60	Abdul Ghani Malik	JKNC	81,254	44.40	20,515	11.20
2	Srinagar	Bakshi Ghulam Mohammad	JKNC	59,415	46.76	A. M. Tariq	INC	50,179	39.49	9,236	7.27
3	Anantnag	Mohammad Shafi Qureshi	INC	Seat Won Uncontested							
4	Ladakh	Kushok Bakula	INC	Seat Won Uncontested							
5	Udhampur	G. S. Brigadier	INC	134,684	54.88	B. Singh	BJS	77,806	31.70	56,878	23.18
6	Jammu	Inder Jit Malhotra	INC	139,036	48.42	A. Rehman	BJS	80,868	28.17	58,168	20.25

== See also ==
- Elections in Jammu and Kashmir
