= 1971 Indian general election in Jammu and Kashmir =

Indian general election in Jammu and Kashmir, 1971
- 3 April
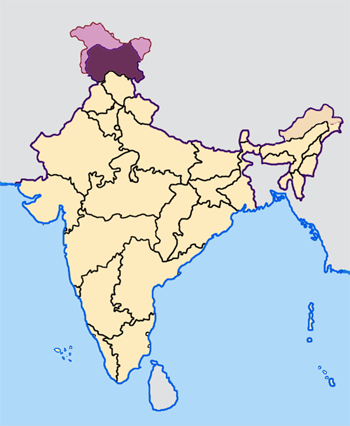
- Jammu and Kashmir

The 1971 Indian general election in Jammu and Kashmir to the 5th Lok Sabha were held for 6 seats. Indian National Congress won 5 seats and an independent candidate from Srinagar constituency won 1 seat.

== Constituency Details ==
Constituency	Electors	Voters	Polling %
Baramulla	370345	187484	50.62
Srinagar	371494	218752	58.88
Anantnag	393878	264867	67.25
Ladakh	52654	37521	71.26
Udhampur	425780	218069	51.22
Jammu	483472	292392	60.48

== Results ==
=== Party-wise Results ===
Party Name	Popular vote			Seats		
Party Name	Votes	%	±pp	Contested	Won	+/−
INC	6,30,690	54.06	▲3.54	6	5	Steady
BJS	1,42,750	12.23	▼8.11	3	0	Steady
SAD	12,658	1.08	Steady	2	0	Steady
PSP	5,332	0.46	Steady	1	0	Steady
IND	3,75,316	32.17	▲31.60	20	1	▲1
Total	11,66,746	100%	-	32	6	-

=== List of Elected MPs ===
Constituency		Winner				Runner-up				Margin	
Constituency		Candidate	Party	Votes	%	Candidate	Party	Votes	%	Votes	%
1	Baramulla	Syed Ahmad Aga	INC	93,041	51.02	Syed Ali Shah Gilani	IND	78,543	43.07	14,498	7.95
2	Srinagar	Shamim Ahmad Shamim	IND	128,948	61.78	Bakhshi Gulam Mohd	INC	71,140	34.08	57,808	27.70
3	Anantnag	Mohammad Shafi Qureshi	INC	150,827	60.30	Peep Gulam Nabi Shah	IND	90,434	36.15	60,393	24.15
4	Ladakh	Kushok Bakula	INC	20,783	55.41	Sonam Wahgdus	IND	16,726	44.59	4,057	10.82
5	Udhampur	Karan Singh	INC	125,890	60.97	Baldev Singh	BJS	53,303	25.82	72,587	35.15
6	Jammu	Inderjit Malhotra	INC	169,009	60.04	Abdul Rehman	BJS	84,213	29.91	84,796	30.13

== See also ==
- Elections in Jammu and Kashmir
