= 1998 Indian general election in Jammu and Kashmir =

Indian general election in Jammu and Kashmir, 1998
- 16 Feb, 28 Feb, 7 March, 3 June
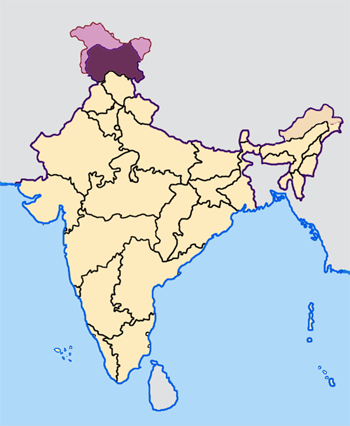
- Jammu and Kashmir

The 1998 Indian general election in Jammu and Kashmir to the 12th Lok Sabha were held for 6 seats. Jammu and Kashmir National Conference won 3 seats, Bharatiya Janata Party won 2 seats and Indian National Congress won 1 seat.

== Election Schedule ==
Constituency-wise Polling and Result Dates
#	Constituency Name	Polling Date	Counting Date	Declaration of Result
1	Baramulla	7 March 1998	9 March 1998	10 March 1998
2	Srinagar	28 February 1998	8 March 1998	9 March 1998
3	Anantnag	7 March 1998	9 March 1998	10 March 1998
4	Ladakh	3 June 1998	6 June 1998	7 June 1998
5	Udhampur	7 March 1998	16 April 1998	17 April 1998
6	Jammu	16 February 1998	8 March 1998	9 March 1998

== Constituency Details ==
Constituency-wise Election Statistics
#	Constituency Name	Candidates	Electors	Voters	Polling %
1	Baramulla	29	762,028	319,591	41.94%
2	Srinagar	7	853,183	256,490	30.06%
3	Anantnag	13	804,983	226,597	28.15%
4	Ladakh	4	143,492	105,265	73.36%
5	Udhampur	15	1,016,243	522,89	51.45%
6	Jammu	18	1,442,853	789,529	54.72%

== List of Candidates ==
Constituency		JKNC		BJP		INC	
No.	Name	Party	Candidate	Party	Candidate	Party	Candidate
1	Baramulla	JKNC	Saifuddin Soz	BJP	Din Mohmad Chichi (Cheeta)	INC	Abdul Gani Vakil
2	Srinagar	JKNC	Omar Abdullah	BJP	Abdul Rashid Kabuli	INC	Aga Syed Ruhullah Mehdi
3	Anantnag	JKNC	Mohd. Yusuf Teng	BJP	Showkat Hussain Ganie	INC	Mufti Mohammad Sayeed
4	Ladakh	JKNC	Syed Hussain	BJP	Spalzes Angmo	INC	Phuntsog Namgyal
5	Udhampur	JKNC	Rajinder Singh Chib	BJP	Chaman Lal Gupta	INC	Thakur Randhir Singh
6	Jammu	JKNC	Janak Raj Gupta	BJP	Vishno Datt Sharma	INC	Mangat Ram Sharma

== Results ==
=== Party-wise Results ===
Party Name	Popular vote			Seats		
Party Name	Votes	%	±pp	Contested	Won	+/−
JKNC	7,84,669	36.35	Steady	6	3	▲3
BJP	6,18,155	28.64	▲9.60	6	2	▲1
INC	4,15,354	19.24	▼8.22	6	1	▼3
BSP	1,07,386	4.97	▼0.98	4	0	Steady
JKAL	20,843	0.97	Steady	1	0	Steady
Others	56,742	2.62	Steady	18	0	Steady
IND	1,55,448	7.20	▼17.08	45	0	Steady
Total	21,58,597	100%	-	86	4	-

=== List of Elected MPs ===
Constituency		Winner				Runner-up				Margin	
Constituency		Candidate	Party	Votes	%	Candidate	Party	Votes	%	Votes	%
1	Baramulla	Professor Saifuddin Soz	JKNC	131,164	43.21	Muzaffar Hussain Baig	IND	93,179	30.69	37,985	12.52
2	Srinagar	Omar Abdullah	JKNC	144,609	59.68	Aga Syed Mohdi	INC	73,770	30.45	70,839	29.23
3	Anantnag	Mufti Mohammad Sayeed	INC	120,444	55.91	Mohd. Yusuf Teng	JKNC	68,444	31.77	52,000	24.14
4	Ladakh	Syed Hussain	JKNC	62,432	59.94	Phuntsog Namgyal	INC	31,875	30.61	30,557	29.33
5	Udhampur	Prof. Chaman Lal Gupta	BJP	250,813	48.67	Rajinder Singh Chib	JKNC	169,449	32.88	81,364	15.79
6	Jammu	Vaid Vishnu Dutt	BJP	336,472	43.26	Janak Raj Gupta	JKNC	208,571	26.81	127,901	16.45

== See also ==
- Results of the 2004 Indian general election by state
