= 2009 Indian general election in Jammu and Kashmir =

Election

- 16 April, 23 April, 30 April

6 seats
- Turnout: 39.70%
	First party	Second party
	UPA	Ind
Party	UPA	Independent
Seats won	5	1
Seat change	▲2	Steady
Percentage	43.78%
Prime Minister before election
Manmohan Singh
INC
Prime Minister after election
Manmohan Singh
INC

The 2009 Indian general election in Jammu and Kashmir to the 15th Lok Sabha were held for 6 seats. Jammu and Kashmir National Conference won 3 seats. Indian National Congress won 2 and one was won by an Independent politician Hassan Khan.

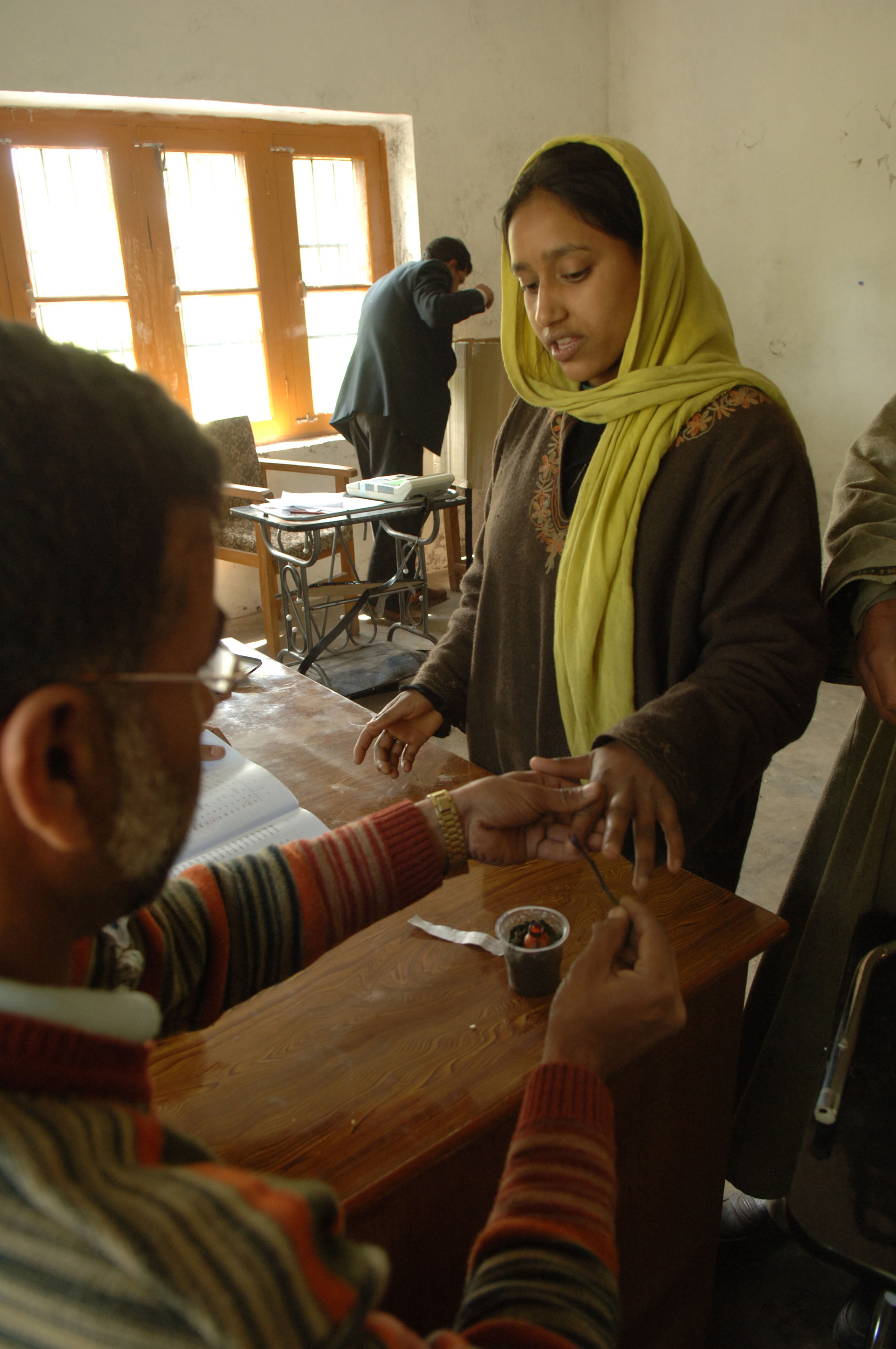
A polling officer administering indelible ink at the finger of a female voter at a polling booth in Budgam, Srinagar during the 4th Phase the elections

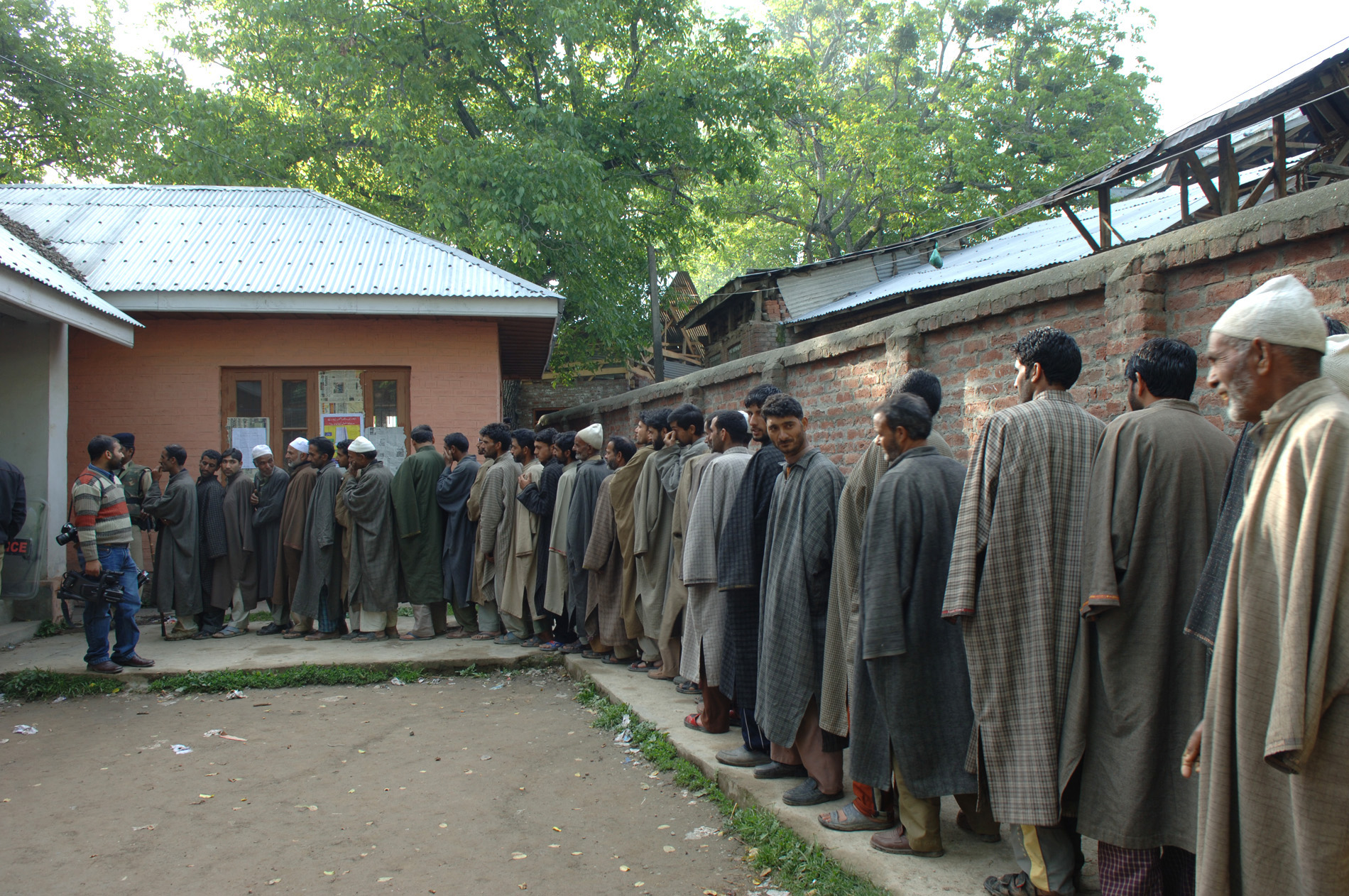
Voters standing in a queue for their turn to cast votes at a polling booth of Budgam, Srinagar in Jammu & Kashmir

== Parties and alliances ==
Party/Alliance		Flag	Electoral symbol	Leader	Seats contested
UPA	Jammu & Kashmir National Conference			Farooq Abdullah	3
UPA	Indian National Congress			Ghulam Nabi Azad	3
Jammu & Kashmir Peoples Democratic Party				Mufti Mohammed Sayeed	6
Bharatiya Janata Party				Ashok Kumar Khajuria	4

== List of Candidates ==
Constituency		UPA		JKPDP		BJP	
#	Name	Party	Candidate	Party	Candidate	Party	Candidate
1	Baramulla	JKNC	Sharifuddin Shariq	JKPDP	Md. Dilawar Mir		
2	Srinagar	JKNC	Farooq Abdullah	JKPDP	Iftikhar Ansari	BJP	Avtar Krishen Pandita
3	Anantnag	JKNC	Mirza Mehboob Beg	JKPDP	Peer Md. Hussain	BJP	Mohd Sidiq Khan
4	Ladakh	INC	P. Namgyal	JKPDP	Ghulam Murtaza		
5	Udhampur	INC	Ch. Lal Singh	JKPDP	Balbir Singh	BJP	Nirmal Kumar Singh
6	Jammu	INC	Madan Lal Sharma	JKPDP	S. Tarlok Singh	BJP	Lila Karan Sharma

== Results ==
=== Party-wise Results ===
Alliance/ Party		Popular vote			Seats		
Alliance/ Party		Votes	%	±pp	Contested	Won	+/−
UPA	JKNC	4,98,374	19.11	▼2.91	3	3	▲1
UPA	INC	6,43,175	24.67	▼3.16	3	2	Steady
UPA	Total	11,41,549	43.78	Steady	6	5	Steady
JKPDP		5,22,760	20.05	▲8.11	6	0	▼1
BJP		4,85,303	18.61	▼4.43	4	0	Steady
Others		2,93,933	11.27	Steady	37	0	Steady
IND		1,63,790	6.28	▼1.10	28	1	Steady
Total		26,07,335	100%	-	81	6	-

=== List of Elected MPs ===
Constituency		Winner				Runner-up				Margin	
Constituency		Candidate	Party	Votes	%	Candidate	Party	Votes	%	Votes	%
1	Baramulla	Sharief Ud Din Shariq	JKNC	203,022	46.01	Mohammad Dilawar Mir	JKPDP	138,208	31.32	64,814	14.69
2	Srinagar	Farooq Abdullah	JKNC	147,035	52.00	Iftikhar Hussain Ansari	JKPDP	116,793	41.3	30,242	10.7
3	Anantnag	Mirza Mehboob Beg	JKNC	148,317	46.53	Peer Mohd Hussain	JKPDP	143,093	44.9	5,224	1.63
4	Ladakh	Hassan Khan	IND	32,701	29.84	Phuntsog Namgyal	INC	29,017	26.48	3,684	3.36
5	Udhampur	Ch. Lal Singh	INC	231,853	37.9	Dr. Nirmal Singh	BJP	218,459	35.71	13,394	2.19
6	Jammu	Madan Lal Sharma	INC	382,305	45.33	Lila Karan Sharma	BJP	260,932	30.94	121,373	14.39

== Assembly Seat wise leads ==
Constituency		Winner			Runner-up			Margin
#	Name	Candidate	Party	Votes	Candidate	Party	Votes	Margin
Baramulla Lok Sabha constituency
1	Karnah	Sharief Ud Din Shariq	JKNC	7,669	Sajad Gani Lone	JKPC	3,849	3,820
2	Kupwara	Sharief Ud Din Shariq	JKNC	19,187	Sajad Gani Lone	JKPC	18,430	757
3	Lolab	Mohammad Dilawar Mir	JKPDP	15,594	Sharief Ud Din Shariq	JKNC	13,754	1,840
4	Handwara	Sharief Ud Din Shariq	JKNC	23,775	Sajad Gani Lone	JKPC	20,438	3,337
5	Langate	Sharief Ud Din Shariq	JKNC	11,161	Mohammad Dilawar Mir	JKPDP	7,541	3,620
6	Uri	Sharief Ud Din Shariq	JKNC	22,149	Mohammad Dilawar Mir	JKPDP	6,509	15,640
7	Rafiabad	Mohammad Dilawar Mir	JKPDP	20,382	Sharief Ud Din Shariq	JKNC	19,353	1,029
8	Sopore	Sharief Ud Din Shariq	JKNC	5,911	Mohammad Dilawar Mir	JKPDP	4,780	1,131
9	Gurez	Sharief Ud Din Shariq	JKNC	5,547	Mohammad Dilawar Mir	JKPDP	1,344	4,203
10	Bandipora	Sharief Ud Din Shariq	JKNC	13,421	Mohammad Dilawar Mir	JKPDP	13,120	301
11	Sonawari	Sharief Ud Din Shariq	JKNC	27,585	Mohammad Dilawar Mir	JKPDP	16,122	11,463
12	Sangrama	Sharief Ud Din Shariq	JKNC	7,505	Mohammad Dilawar Mir	JKPDP	7,469	36
13	Baramulla	Mohammad Dilawar Mir	JKPDP	8,490	Sharief Ud Din Shariq	JKNC	6,860	1,630
14	Gulmarg	Sharief Ud Din Shariq	JKNC	11,094	Mohammad Dilawar Mir	JKPDP	8,560	2,534
15	Pattan	Mohammad Dilawar Mir	JKPDP	12,295	Sharief Ud Din Shariq	JKNC	7,021	5,274
Srinagar Lok Sabha constituency
16	Kangan	Farooq Abdullah	JKNC	16,386	Iftikhar Hussain Ansari	JKPDP	6,304	10,082
17	Ganderbal	Farooq Abdullah	JKNC	14,925	Iftikhar Hussain Ansari	JKPDP	8,917	6,008
18	Hazratbal	Iftikhar Hussain Ansari	JKPDP	7,010	Farooq Abdullah	JKNC	5,004	2,006
19	Zadibal	Iftikhar Hussain Ansari	JKPDP	6,504	Farooq Abdullah	JKNC	2,691	3,813
20	Eidgah	Farooq Abdullah	JKNC	2,661	Iftikhar Hussain Ansari	JKPDP	1,239	1,422
21	Khanyar	Farooq Abdullah	JKNC	3,204	Iftikhar Hussain Ansari	JKPDP	226	2,978
22	Habba Kadal	Farooq Abdullah	JKNC	804	Iftikhar Hussain Ansari	JKPDP	67	737
23	Amira Kadal	Farooq Abdullah	JKNC	2,961	Iftikhar Hussain Ansari	JKPDP	654	2,307
24	Sonawar	Farooq Abdullah	JKNC	9,186	Iftikhar Hussain Ansari	JKPDP	8,971	215
25	Batmaloo	Farooq Abdullah	JKNC	7,000	Iftikhar Hussain Ansari	JKPDP	6,521	479
26	Chadoora	Iftikhar Hussain Ansari	JKPDP	14,139	Farooq Abdullah	JKNC	11,538	2,601
27	Budgam	Iftikhar Hussain Ansari	JKPDP	15,760	Farooq Abdullah	JKNC	14,228	1,532
28	Beerwah	Iftikhar Hussain Ansari	JKPDP	16,867	Farooq Abdullah	JKNC	14,838	2,029
29	Khan Sahib	Farooq Abdullah	JKNC	14,373	Iftikhar Hussain Ansari	JKPDP	12,985	1,388
30	Chrar-i-Sharief	Farooq Abdullah	JKNC	26,573	Iftikhar Hussain Ansari	JKPDP	10,593	15,980
Anantnag Lok Sabha constituency
31	Tral	Peer Mohammad Hussain	JKPDP	955	Mirza Mehboob Beg	JKNC	790	165
32	Pampore	Peer Mohammad Hussain	JKPDP	1,900	Mirza Mehboob Beg	JKNC	1,177	723
33	Pulwama	Peer Mohammad Hussain	JKPDP	6,564	Mirza Mehboob Beg	JKNC	5,392	1,172
34	Rajpora	Peer Mohammad Hussain	JKPDP	6,982	Mirza Mehboob Beg	JKNC	5,820	1,162
35	Wachi	Mirza Mehboob Beg	JKNC	6,677	Peer Mohammad Hussain	JKPDP	5,624	1,053
36	Shopian	Mirza Mehboob Beg	JKNC	7,503	Peer Mohammad Hussain	JKPDP	4,348	3,155
37	Noorabad	Mirza Mehboob Beg	JKNC	16,079	Peer Mohammad Hussain	JKPDP	13,494	2,585
38	Kulgam	Mirza Mehboob Beg	JKNC	8,337	Peer Mohammad Hussain	JKPDP	6,779	1,558
39	Hom Shali Bugh	Mirza Mehboob Beg	JKNC	8,166	Peer Mohammad Hussain	JKPDP	8,144	22
40	Anantnag	Mirza Mehboob Beg	JKNC	8,620	Peer Mohammad Hussain	JKPDP	8,554	66
41	Devsar	Peer Mohammad Hussain	JKPDP	14,983	Mirza Mehboob Beg	JKNC	13,792	1,191
42	Dooru	Mirza Mehboob Beg	JKNC	9,878	Peer Mohammad Hussain	JKPDP	6,413	3,465
43	Kokernag	Mirza Mehboob Beg	JKNC	14,299	Peer Mohammad Hussain	JKPDP	7,910	6,389
44	Shangus	Peer Mohammad Hussain	JKPDP	16,889	Mirza Mehboob Beg	JKNC	10,745	6,144
45	Bijbehara	Peer Mohammad Hussain	JKPDP	13,186	Mirza Mehboob Beg	JKNC	12,901	285
46	Pahalgam	Peer Mohammad Hussain	JKPDP	20,232	Mirza Mehboob Beg	JKNC	16,529	3,703
Ladakh Lok Sabha constituency
47	Nubra	Phuntsog Namgyal	INC	4,312	Thinless Angmo	IND	3,788	524
48	Leh	Phuntsog Namgyal	INC	19,479	Thinless Angmo	IND	14,777	4,702
49	Kargil	Hassan Khan	IND	23,253	Asgar Ali Karbalaie	IND	19,951	3,302
50	Zanskar	Hassan Khan	IND	6,354	Asgar Ali Karbalaie	IND	3,887	2,467
Udhampur Lok Sabha constituency
51	Kishtwar	Ch. Lal Singh	INC	11,920	Dr. Nirmal Singh	BJP	11,579	341
52	Inderwal	Ch. Lal Singh	INC	19,163	Dr. Nirmal Singh	BJP	6,830	12,333
53	Doda	Ch. Lal Singh	INC	9,948	Dr. Nirmal Singh	BJP	9,558	390
54	Bhaderwah	Ch. Lal Singh	INC	21,712	Dr. Nirmal Singh	BJP	19,655	2,057
55	Ramban (SC)	Dr. Nirmal Singh	BJP	10,694	Ch. Lal Singh	INC	10,453	241
56	Banihal	Ch. Lal Singh	INC	12,924	Balbir Singh	JKPDP	3,547	9,377
57	Gulab Garh	Ch. Lal Singh	INC	15,348	Dr. Nirmal Singh	BJP	3,899	11,449
58	Reasi	Dr. Nirmal Singh	BJP	18,330	Ch. Lal Singh	INC	12,246	6,084
59	Gool Arnas	Ch. Lal Singh	INC	14,911	Dr. Nirmal Singh	BJP	3,345	11,566
60	Udhampur	Dr. Nirmal Singh	BJP	16,061	Prof. Bhim Singh	JKNPP	14,728	1,333
61	Chenani (SC)	Prof. Bhim Singh	JKNPP	12,986	Ch. Lal Singh	INC	8,683	4,303
62	Ram Nagar	Prof. Bhim Singh	JKNPP	22,429	Ch. Lal Singh	INC	6,058	16,371
63	Bani	Dr. Nirmal Singh	BJP	8,635	Ch. Lal Singh	INC	4,428	4,207
64	Basohli	Dr. Nirmal Singh	BJP	17,448	Ch. Lal Singh	INC	16,339	1,109
65	Kathua	Dr. Nirmal Singh	BJP	27,803	Ch. Lal Singh	INC	23,634	4,169
66	Billawar	Dr. Nirmal Singh	BJP	21,884	Ch. Lal Singh	INC	15,033	6,851
67	Hira Nagar (SC)	Dr. Nirmal Singh	BJP	27,699	Ch. Lal Singh	INC	17,217	10,482
Jammu Lok Sabha constituency
68	Samba (SC)	Lila Karan Sharma	BJP	12,695	Madan Lal Sharma	INC	10,807	1,888
69	Vijay Pur	Madan Lal Sharma	INC	22,723	Lila Karan Sharma	BJP	17,617	5,106
70	Nagrota	Madan Lal Sharma	INC	11,201	Lila Karan Sharma	BJP	8,950	2,251
71	Gandhi Nagar	Madan Lal Sharma	INC	27,089	Lila Karan Sharma	BJP	25,939	1,150
72	Jammu East	Lila Karan Sharma	BJP	14,593	Madan Lal Sharma	INC	8,863	5,730
73	Jammu West	Lila Karan Sharma	BJP	35,536	Madan Lal Sharma	INC	25,580	9,956
74	Bishnah	Lila Karan Sharma	BJP	15,915	Madan Lal Sharma	INC	10,794	5,121
75	Ranbir Singh Pura (SC)	Madan Lal Sharma	INC	16,608	Lila Karan Sharma	BJP	11,895	4,713
76	Suchet Garh	S. Tarlok Singh	JKPDP	10,600	Lila Karan Sharma	BJP	9,655	945
77	Marh	Madan Lal Sharma	INC	14,410	Lila Karan Sharma	BJP	13,400	1,010
78	Raipur Domana (SC)	Lila Karan Sharma	BJP	18,333	Madan Lal Sharma	INC	16,167	2,166
79	Akhnoor	Madan Lal Sharma	INC	35,228	Lila Karan Sharma	BJP	9,838	25,390
80	Chhamb (SC)	Madan Lal Sharma	INC	17,349	Lila Karan Sharma	BJP	14,572	2,777
81	Nowshera	Madan Lal Sharma	INC	18,780	Lila Karan Sharma	BJP	18,191	589
82	Darhal	Madan Lal Sharma	INC	22,111	S. Tarlok Singh	JKPDP	14,943	7,168
83	Rajouri	Madan Lal Sharma	INC	31,154	Lila Karan Sharma	BJP	6,515	24,639
84	Kala Kote	Madan Lal Sharma	INC	12,510	Lila Karan Sharma	BJP	12,100	410
85	Suran Kote	Madan Lal Sharma	INC	24,664	S. Tarlok Singh	JKPDP	9,129	15,535
86	Mendhar	Madan Lal Sharma	INC	26,434	S. Tarlok Singh	JKPDP	16,793	9,641
87	Poonch Haveli	Madan Lal Sharma	INC	20,966	S. Tarlok Singh	JKPDP	12,270	8,696

== Post-election Union Council of Ministers from Jammu and Kashmir ==
#	Name	Constituency	Designation	Department	From	To	Party
1	Farooq Abdullah	Srinagar	Cabinet Minister	New and Renewable Energy	28 May 2009	26 May 2014	JKNC
2	Ghulam Nabi Azad	Jammu and Kashmir (Rajya Sabha)	Cabinet Minister	Health and Family Welfare	28 May 2009	26 May 2014	INC
2	Ghulam Nabi Azad	Jammu and Kashmir (Rajya Sabha)	Cabinet Minister	Water Resources (Additional Charge)	1 February 2014	26 May 2014	INC

== Assembly segments wise lead of Parties ==
Party	Assembly segments	Position in Assembly (as of 2008 election)
Jammu & Kashmir National Conference	29	28
Indian National Congress	23	17
Jammu and Kashmir Peoples Democratic Party	18	21
Bharatiya Janata Party	13	11
Jammu and Kashmir National Panthers Party	2	3
Others	2	7
Total	87	

== See also ==
- Results of the 2009 Indian general election by state
- Elections in Jammu and Kashmir
