= 1977 Indian general election in Jammu and Kashmir =

Indian general election in Jammu and Kashmir, 1977
- 16 March
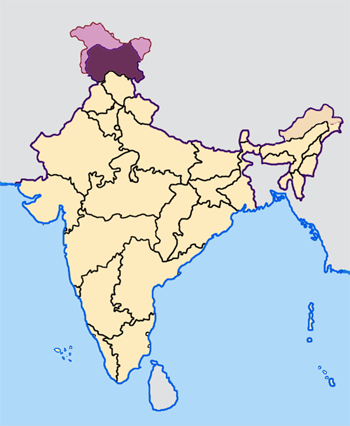
- Jammu and Kashmir

The 1977 Indian general election in Jammu and Kashmir to the 6th Lok Sabha were held for 6 seats. Jammu and Kashmir National Conference won 2 seats, Indian National Congress won 2 seats and an independent candidate Parvati Devi of Ladakh constituency won 1 seat.

== Constituency Details ==
Constituency	Electors	Voters	Polling %
Baramulla	453765	258507	56.97
Srinagar	461965	319298	69.12
Anantnag	471302	263112	55.83
Ladakh	64706	45581	70.44
Udhampur	504677	237356	47.03
Jammu	601007	355660	59.18

== List of Candidates ==
Constituency					
Constituency		JKNC + INC		BLD	
1	Baramulla	JKNC	Abdul Ahad	Did not contest	
2	Srinagar	JKNC	Begum Akbar Jehan Abdullah	Did not contest	
3	Anantnag	INC	Mohammad Shafi Qureshi	Did not contest	
4	Ladakh	INC	Parvati Devi	Did not contest	
5	Udhampur	INC	Karan Singh	BLD	Om Parkash Saraf
6	Jammu	JKNC	Balraj Puri	BLD	Abdul Rehman

== Results ==
=== Party-wise Results ===
Party Name	Popular vote			Seats		
Party Name	Votes	%	±pp	Contested	Won	+/−
JKNC	4,83,192	33.92	New	3	2	▲2
INC	2,33,144	16.37	▼37.69	3	3	▼2
BLD	1,17,198	8.23	New	2	0	Steady
IND	5,90,790	41.48	▲9.31	21	1	Steady
Total	14,24,324	100%	-	29	6	-

=== List of Elected MPs ===
Constituency		Winner				Runner Up				Margin	%
#	Name	Candidate	Party	Votes	%	Candidate	Party	Votes	%	Margin	%
1	Baramulla	Abdul Ahad	JKNC	147,222	59.50	Syed Alishah Geelani	IND	100,202	40.50	47,020	19.00
2	Srinagar	Akbar Jahan Begam	JKNC	210,072	67.73	Molvi Iftikhar Hussain Ansari	IND	87,431	28.19	122,641	39.54
3	Anantnag	Mohammad Shafi Qureshi	INC	79,742	32.07	Ab. Razak Mir	IND	71,411	28.72	8,331	3.35
4	Ladakh	Parvati Devi	INC	23,130	53.32	Mohammad Ali Alias Ali Kargil	IND	20,253	46.68	2,877	6.64
5	Udhampur	Karan Singh	INC	130,272	56.69	Om Parkash Saraf	BLD	71,316	31.03	58,956	25.66
6	Jammu	Thakur Baldev Singh	IND	153,837	44.60	Balraj Puri	JKNC	125,898	36.50	27,939	8.10

== See also ==
- Elections in Jammu and Kashmir
