= Rafiq Ahmad Naik =

Indian politician

Member of Jammu and Kashmir Legislative Assembly
- Incumbent
- Assumed office 8 October 2024
- Preceded by: Mushtaq Ahmad Shah
- Constituency: Tral Assembly constituency

Personal details
- Party: Jammu and Kashmir People's Democratic Party
- Profession: Politician

Rafiq Ahmad Naik is an Indian politician from Jammu & Kashmir. He is a Member of the Jammu & Kashmir Legislative Assembly from 2024, representing Tral Assembly constituency as a Member of the Jammu and Kashmir People's Democratic Party. He is the son of former speaker Ali Mohammad Naik.

== Electoral performance ==
Election	Constituency	Party	Result	Votes %	Opposition Candidate	Opposition Party	Opposition vote %	Ref
2024	Tral	JKPDP	Won	24.69%	Surinder Singh	INC	23.63%	

== See also ==
- 2024 Jammu & Kashmir Legislative Assembly election
- Jammu and Kashmir Legislative Assembly
