= 1980 Indian general election in Jammu and Kashmir =

Indian general election in Jammu and Kashmir, 1980
- 3,6 Jan
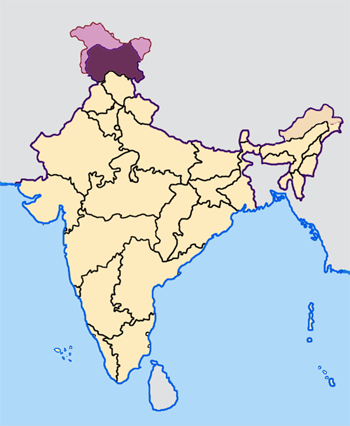
- Jammu and Kashmir

The 1980 Indian general election in Jammu and Kashmir to the 7th Lok Sabha were held for 6 seats. Jammu and Kashmir National Conference won 3 seats, Indian National Congress (I) won 1, Indian National Congress (U) won 1 seat and an independent candidate Phuntsog Namgyal of Ladakh constituency won 1 seat.

== Constituency Details ==
Constituency	Electors	Voters	Polling %
Baramulla	489040	273949	56.02
Srinagar	519706	-	-
Anantnag	511132	306998	60.06
Ladakh	77631	48000	61.83
Udhampur	578770	338969	58.57
Jammu	691358	410072	59.31

== Results ==
=== Party-wise Results ===
Party	Popular vote			Seats		
Party	Votes	%	±pp	Contested	Won	+/−
JKNC	4,93,143	36.88	▲2.96	5	3	▲1
INC(I)	2,49,760	18.68	New	1	1	New
INC(U)	1,94,138	14.52	New	2	1	New
JP	1,15,503	8.64	▲0.41	1	0	Steady
IND	2,84,459	21.28	▼20.20	20	1	Steady
Total	13,37,003	100%	-	29	6	-

=== List of Elected MPs ===
Constituency		Winner				Runner-up				Margin	
Constituency		Candidate	Party	Votes	%	Candidate	Party	Votes	%	Votes	%
1	Baramulla	Khawaja Mubarak Shah	JKNC	178,533	67.57	Muzaffar Hussain Baig	IND	75,256	28.48	103,277	39.09
2	Srinagar	Farooq Abdullah	JKNC	Won Uncontested							
3	Anantnag	Gh. Rasool Kochak	JKNC	179,020	60.47	Ali Mohd. Naik	IND	95,050	32.11	83,970	28.36
4	Ladakh	Phuntsog Namgyal	IND	20,314	44.47	Kacho Habib Ullah Khan	JKNC	14,262	31.22	6,052	13.25
5	Udhampur	Karan Singh	INC(U)	176,757	53.38	Devi Das Thakur	JKNC	121,328	36.64	55,429	16.74
6	Jammu	Girdhari Lal Dogra	INC(I)	249,760	62.46	Thakur Baldev Singh	JP	115,503	28.88	134,257	33.58

== See also ==
- Elections in Jammu and Kashmir
