= 1984 Indian general election in Jammu and Kashmir =

Indian general election in Jammu and Kashmir, 1984
- 24 Dec
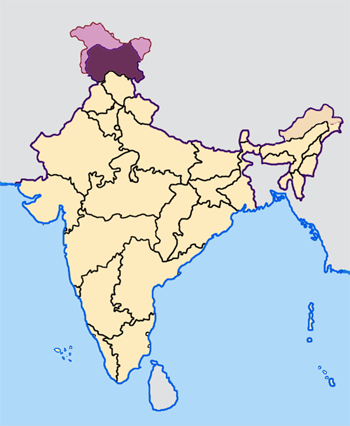
- Jammu and Kashmir

The 1984 Indian general election in Jammu and Kashmir to the 8th Lok Sabha were held for 6 seats. Jammu and Kashmir National Conference won 3 seats and Indian National Congress won 3 seats.

== Constituency Details ==
Constituency	Electors	Voters	Polling %
Baramulla	571205	348963	61.09
Srinagar	640514	470871	73.51
Anantnag	611518	428548	70.08
Ladakh	89717	61264	68.29
Udhampur	675228	372077	55.10
Jammu	811828	576390	71.00

== Results ==
=== Party-wise Results ===
Party Name	Popular vote			Seats		
Party Name	Votes	%	±pp	Contested	Won	+/−
JKNC	10,10,243	46.17	▲9.29	5	3	Steady
INC	6,61,435	30.23	▲11.55	4	3	▲2
JKPP	95,149	4.35	Steady	1	0	Steady
BJP	37,309	1.71	Steady	1	0	Steady
LKD	2,423	0.11	Steady	1	0	Steady
JKPC	646	0.03	Steady	1	0	Steady
IND	38,095	17.41	▼3.87	35	0	Steady
Total	18,45,300	100%	-	48	6	-

=== List of Elected MPs ===
Constituency		Winner				Runner-up				Margin	
Constituency		Candidate	Party	Votes	%	Candidate	Party	Votes	%	Votes	%
1	Baramulla	Saif-Ud-Din Soz	JKNC	234,357	69.69	Mohi-Ud-Din-Wani	IND	93,938	27.93	140,419	41.76
2	Srinagar	Abdul Rashid Kabuli	JKNC	367,249	81.08	Muzaffer Ahmed Shah	IND	80,972	17.88	286,277	63.20
3	Anantnag	Akbar Jahan Begum	JKNC	240,973	58.51	Peer Hussan-Ud-Din	INC	158,963	38.60	82,010	19.91
4	Ladakh	Phuntsog Namgyal	INC	33,037	55.59	Qamar Ali	JKNC	25,060	42.17	7,977	13.42
5	Udhampur	Girdhari Lal Dogra	INC	206,639	56.98	Bhim Singh	JKPP	95,149	26.24	111,490	30.74
6	Jammu	Janak Raj Gupta	INC	262,796	46.51	Shabir Ahmed Salaria	JKNC	142,604	25.24	120,192	21.27

== Post-election Union Council of Ministers from Jammu & Kashmir ==
SI No.	Name	Constituency	Designation	Department	From	To	Party
1	P. Namgyal	Ladakh	Deputy Minister	Surface Transport	15 February 1988	4 July 1989	INC
1	P. Namgyal	Ladakh	Deputy Minister	Parliamentary Affairs	25 June 1988	4 July 1989	INC
1	P. Namgyal	Ladakh	Minister of State	Industry (Chemicals and Petrochemicals)	4 July 1989	2 September 1989	INC
1	P. Namgyal	Ladakh	Minister of State	Parliamentary Affairs	4 July 1989	2 September 1989	INC

== See also ==
- Elections in Jammu and Kashmir
- Results of the 2004 Indian general election by state
