= 1991 Indian general election in Jammu and Kashmir =

Indian general election in Jammu and Kashmir, 1991
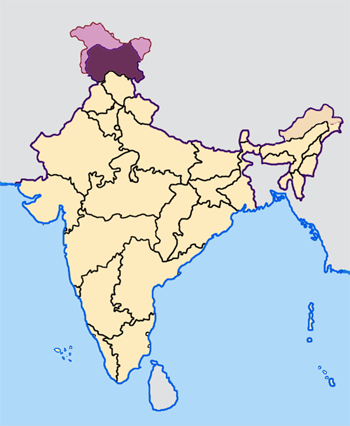
- Jammu and Kashmir

The 1991 Indian general election in Jammu and Kashmir to the 10th Lok Sabha was not held. Insurgency in Jammu and Kashmir which had started in late 1989 had reached a peak in 1990 and 1991 in the region resulting in a collapse of law and order in the state. A state of emergency was followed in Jammu and Kashmir during the time and the Armed Forces (Jammu and Kashmir) Special Powers Act, 1990 was enacted in July, 1990. No general elections to the Lok Sabha (Lower House of Parliament) of India were held in Jammu and Kashmir until May 1996. From 19 January 1990 to 9 October 1996, Governor's rule was enacted in the state which means the suspension of state government and imposition of direct Central Government rule in the state.

== See also ==
- Elections in Jammu and Kashmir
- Results of the 2004 Indian general election by state
- List of chief ministers of Jammu and Kashmir
