= 1934 Jammu and Kashmir Praja Sabha election =

3 September 1934	1938 →

33 seats of 75 seats in Praja Sabha
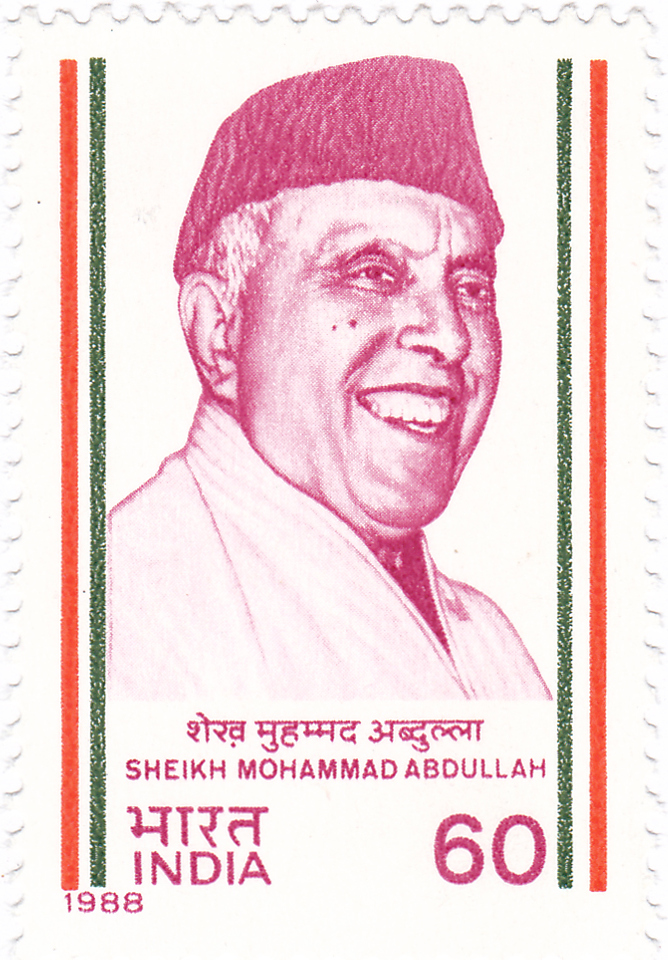
	Majority party	Minority party
Leader	Sheikh Abdullah	Ram Chander Dubey
Party	Muslim Conference	Liberal Group
Seats won	16	13

The first election for a legislative assembly called Praja Sabha was held in 1934 in the princely state of Jammu and Kashmir in the British Indian Empire. The Praja Sabha was to have 75 members, of which 12 would be officials, 33 elected members and 30 nominated members. (Note: The President of the Assembly, Sir Barjor Dalal, makes a distinction between 14 members nominated to constituencies on account of infeasibility of holding elections to them, and 16 members nominated as state councillors.) The election was held on 3 September 1934. The All Jammu and Kashmir Muslim Conference under the leadership of Sheikh Abdullah was the largest elected party with 16 seats won. A 'Liberal Group' championed by the Dogra Sadar Sabha had the overall majority in the Assembly with 24 members.

== Constitution of the Praja Sabha ==
Maharaja Hari Singh of Jammu and Kashmir established a Franchise Committee under the chairmanship of Sir Barjor Dalal (Note: Sir Barjor Dalal was a former member of the Indian Civil Service, and served as a judge of the Allahabad High Court. He was appointed by the Maharaja to chair the inquiry commission on the government's handling of the 1931 Kashmir agitation. Its report has been described as an "outspoken document".) on 31 May 1932 to make recommendations for establishing a Praja Sabha (literally, "People's Assembly") in State. The recommendations came a year later with the proposal for a 75-member assembly in which 33 would be elected members, 30 would be nominated members and 12 would be officials.

The 33 elected members would be further split across religious communities, with 21 seats allocated to Muslims, 10 to Hindus and 2 to Sikhs.

With regard to provinces, the Kashmir province was allocated 16 seats (11 Muslim, 3 Hindu and 1 Sikh). The Jammu province was allocated 17 seats (9 Muslim, 7 Hindu and 1 Sikh). The Ladakh and Gilgit wazarats (districts) only had nominated members (2 and 1 respectively). The internal jagir of Chenani was allocated a nominated member.

== Political background ==
Prior to the election, Sheikh Abdullah's position was said to be shaky. The most active members of the Muslim Conference party were in prison for having participated in the agitation. The younger members were in rebellion, and many joined a rival 'Azad' Muslim Conference started by Mirwaiz Yusuf Shah. Abdullah was suspected of having links to Ahmadiyyas and his marriage to the daughter of Englishman was also unpopular. Nevertheless he presented a moderate face of the party and the British government as well as the Maharaja's government was inclined to provide him encouragement.

However, the government was not entirely cooperative. It is said to have promised that the political prisoners would be released prior to the election, but backtracked on it three hours before the deadline for nominations. Consequently, the Muslim Conference had to fall back on second-rate candidates. Abdullah was bitter: "The Kashmir Government wants to squeeze me [out] by pouncing upon me", was his caustic remark.

The proposed Legislative Assembly did not meet the expectations of the Muslim Conference. Nevertheless, Abdullah persuaded his followers that they should participate in the elections "if only to show the extent of [the] popular support enjoyed" by the party. However, Chaudhry Ghulam Abbas, imprisoned in Udhampur jail, was steadfast in his disapproval. Finally, the general council of the party approved the move on 27 August 1934.

Sheikh Abdullah campaigned vigorously and turned the tide in his favour. The main contest was in the city of Srinagar, where five Muslim seats were contested by Abdullah's Muslim Conference and Yusuf Shah's Azad Muslim Conference.

== Election and results ==
Elections for the Praja Sabha seats were held on 3 September 1934.

Abdullah's Muslim Conference won all five seats in Srinagar, defeating Yusuf Shah's Azad Muslim Conference. Abdullah's biographer Syed Tafazull Hussain finds this remarkable since Yusuf Shah was a respected religious figure of longstanding while Abdullah was only a recent arrival.

All the other seats were uncontested according to Justice Yusuf Saraf.

In the final tally, the Muslim Conference had 16 elected seats in the Assembly, and the Liberal Group championed by Dogra Sadar Sabha had 13. According to the President of the Assembly, 2 Muslim Conference members switched their allegiance to the Liberal Group after two-and-half weeks of the Assembly session. Several nominated members also joined the Liberal Group, taking its final tally in the Assembly to 26. (Note: Several scholarly sources state that the Muslim Conference had won 14 seats. This would appear to be a misreading of the Sir Burjor Dalal's information.) Dalal states that a Pandit Party (Kashmir Pandit Yuvak Sabha) had 3 seats and a Sikh Party had another 3 seats.

The Muslim Conference in the Assembly was led by Mian Ahmad Yar, with Mirza Afzal Beg as the deputy leader. The Liberal Group was led by Ram Chander Dubey.

== Aftermath ==
Sheikh Abdullah, who had already expressed secular views prior to the election, forged a working relationship with the Liberal Group. By the end of the first session, he expressed satisfaction with the "sympathetic attitude of the President and the Ministers."

Soon frictions developed. The elected members got frustrated with their inability to achieve policy changes, and, by March 1935, 29 elected members (14 belonging to the Muslim Conference and 15 to the Liberal Group) submitted a memorandum to the Maharaja asking for the constitution to be revised so as to make the executive responsible to the Legislature. The Kashmiri Pandit party did not participate in the demand. From here onward, demand for responsible government became the rallying cry for the elected legislators. By 2 November 1936, Sardar Budh Singh (Sikh member elected from Mirpur and Poonch) and the Muslim Conference members charged the government with "breach of trust" and resigned en masse. The Maharaja accepted the resignations and called by-elections for those seats.

By-elections were held in July 1937. The Muslim Conference returned the same candidates that had resigned previously.

Subsequently, the Maharaja appointed the liberal politician-administrator, Sir N. Gopalaswami Ayyangar as the prime minister for the state.

== Bibliography ==
- Bose, Sumantra (2003), Kashmir: Roots of Conflict, Paths to Peace, Harvard University Press, ISBN 0-674-01173-2
- Copland, Ian (1981), "Islam and Political Mobilization in Kashmir, 1931-34", Pacific Affairs, 54 (2): 228–259, doi:10.2307/2757363, JSTOR 2757363
- Dalal, Sir Barjor (1935), "The Jammu and Kashmir State Assembly: First Session", Asiatic Review, 31: 137–147 – via archive.org
- Das Gupta, Jyoti Bhusan (2012) [first published 1968], Jammu and Kashmir, Springer, ISBN 978-94-011-9231-6
- Hussain, Syed Taffazull (2016), Sheikh Abdullah-A Biography: The Crucial Period 1905-1939. 2016 Edition, Syed Taffazull Hussain, ISBN 978-1-60481-603-7
- Khan, Ghulam Hassan (1980), Freedom movement in Kashmir, 1931-1940, Light & Life Publishers
- Korbel, Josef (1966) [first published 1954], Danger in Kashmir (second ed.), Princeton University Press, ISBN 9781400875238
- Saraf, Muhammad Yusuf (1977), Kashmiris Fight for Freedom, Volume 1, Ferozsons
  - Saraf, Muhammad Yusuf (2015) [first published 1977 by Ferozsons], Kashmiris Fight for Freedom, Volume 1, Mirpur: National Institute Kashmir Studies
