= Tral Assembly constituency =

Constituency of the Jammu and Kashmir Legislative Assembly

Coordinates: 33.93°N 75.11°E

Tral
- Constituency No. 33 for the Jammu and Kashmir Legislative Assembly

Constituency details
- Country: India
- State: Jammu and Kashmir
- District: Pulwama
- Lok Sabha constituency: Srinagar
- Established: 1962

Member of Legislative Assembly
- Incumbent Rafiq Ahmad Naik
- Party: JKPDP
- Elected year: 2024

Tral Assembly constituency is one of the 90 constituencies in the Jammu and Kashmir Legislative Assembly of Jammu and Kashmir a north state of India. Tral is part of Srinagar Lok Sabha constituency.

== Members of the Legislative Assembly ==
Election	Member	Party
1962	A. G. Trali	Jammu and Kashmir National Conference
1967	Ali Muhammad Naik	Independent
1972	Ali Muhammad Naik	Independent
1977	Muhammad Subhan Bhat	Jammu and Kashmir National Conference
1983	Ali Muhammad Naik	Independent
1987	Ghulam Nabi Naik	Indian National Congress
1996	Ali Muhammad Naik	Jammu & Kashmir National Conference
2002	Ghulam Nabi Bhat	Jammu & Kashmir National Conference
2008	Mushtaq Ahmad Shah	Jammu and Kashmir Peoples Democratic Party
2014	Mushtaq Ahmad Shah	Jammu and Kashmir Peoples Democratic Party
2024	Rafiq Ahmad Naik	Jammu and Kashmir Peoples Democratic Party

== Election results ==
=== Assembly Election 2024 ===
2024 Jammu and Kashmir Legislative Assembly election : Tral
Party	Candidate	Votes	%	±%
JKPDP	Rafiq Ahmad Naik	10,710	24.69%	▼13.87
INC	Surinder Singh	10,250	23.63%	▲12.29
Independent	Ghulam Nabi Bhat	9,778	22.54%	New
Independent	Harbaksh Singh Sassan	8,557	19.73%	New
NOTA	None of the Above	1,445	3.33%	▲1.10
Independent	Pushvinder Singh	766	1.77%	New
All Jammu and Kashmir Liberal Democratic Party	Abdul Rashid Gojar	709	1.63%	New
Independent	Abdul Rashid Gojjer	461	1.06%	New
Independent	Zahid Iqbal	444	1.02%	New
Margin of victory		460	1.06%	▼11.71
Turnout		43,378	44.19%	▲5.97
Registered electors		98,156		▲16.53
JKPDP hold		Swing	▼13.87	

=== Assembly Election 2014 ===
2014 Jammu and Kashmir Legislative Assembly election : Tral
Party	Candidate	Votes	%	±%
JKPDP	Mushtaq Ahmad Shah	12,415	38.56%	▲10.10
JKNC	Mohammed Ashraf Bhat	8,305	25.80%	▲7.76
INC	Gh Mohammed Mir	3,649	11.33%	▲2.69
BJP	Avtar Singh	2,945	9.15%	New
Independent	Abdul Rashid Dar	2,222	6.90%	New
Independent	Sheikh Ab Rashid	1,649	5.12%	New
NOTA	None of the Above	717	2.23%	New
JKNPP	Krishan Singh	291	0.90%	New
Margin of victory		4,110	12.77%	▲2.34
Turnout		32,193	38.22%	▼10.47
Registered electors		84,231		▲12.32
JKPDP hold		Swing	▲10.10	

=== Assembly Election 2008 ===
2008 Jammu and Kashmir Legislative Assembly election : Tral
Party	Candidate	Votes	%	±%
JKPDP	Mushtaq Ahmad Shah	10,393	28.47%	New
JKNC	Mohammed Ashraf Bhat	6,586	18.04%	▼29.26
Independent	Ghulam Mohammed Mir	3,733	10.22%	New
INC	Surinder Singh	3,158	8.65%	▼34.15
Jammu & Kashmir Democratic Party Nationalist	Abdul Rashid Sheikh	2,997	8.21%	New
Independent	Nazir Ahmad Badana	1,369	3.75%	New
Independent	Ghulam Nabi Bhat	1,229	3.37%	New
Independent	Gh Mohi Udin Shah	1,070	2.93%	New
Independent	Ghulam Hassan Reshi	809	2.22%	New
JKPDF	Javaid Ahmad Lone	764	2.09%	New
Margin of victory		3,807	10.43%	▲5.93
Turnout		36,510	48.69%	▲37.14
Registered electors		74,992		▲25.92
JKPDP gain from JKNC		Swing	▼18.83	

=== Assembly Election 2002 ===
2002 Jammu and Kashmir Legislative Assembly election : Tral
Party	Candidate	Votes	%	±%
JKNC	Ghulam Nabi Bhat	3,253	47.30%	▼30.63
INC	Surinder Singh	2,944	42.80%	▲39.04
BSP	Surjeet Singh	681	9.90%	New
Margin of victory		309	4.49%	▼66.14
Turnout		6,878	11.55%	▼42.64
Registered electors		59,555		▲10.64
JKNC hold		Swing		

=== Assembly Election 1996 ===
1996 Jammu and Kashmir Legislative Assembly election : Tral
Party	Candidate	Votes	%	±%
JKNC	Ali Muhammad Naik	22,732	77.92%	New
JKNPP	Krishan Singh	2,127	7.29%	New
AIIC(T)	Ali Mohammed	1,863	6.39%	New
JD	Abdul Ahad Wani	1,351	4.63%	New
INC	Silender Singh	1,099	3.77%	▼31.40
Margin of victory		20,605	70.63%	▲67.14
Turnout		29,172	58.30%	▼31.45
Registered electors		53,830		▲18.95
JKNC gain from INC		Swing	▲42.76	

=== Assembly Election 1987 ===
1987 Jammu and Kashmir Legislative Assembly election : Tral
Party	Candidate	Votes	%	±%
INC	Ghulam Nabi Naik	13,629	35.17%	New
Independent	Mohmad Sultan	12,274	31.67%	New
Independent	Ali Muhammad Naik	11,171	28.82%	New
Independent	Kanwal Nain Singh	1,683	4.34%	New
Margin of victory		1,355	3.50%	▼18.61
Turnout		38,757	87.45%	▼0.83
Registered electors		45,254		▲12.26
INC gain from Independent		Swing	▼25.89	

=== Assembly Election 1983 ===
1983 Jammu and Kashmir Legislative Assembly election : Tral
Party	Candidate	Votes	%	±%
Independent	Ali Muhammad Naik	21,283	61.05%	New
JKNC	Mohammed Subhan Bhat	13,578	38.95%	▼7.10
Margin of victory		7,705	22.10%	▲17.07
Turnout		34,861	88.32%	▲4.04
Registered electors		40,313		▲14.94
Independent gain from JKNC		Swing		

=== Assembly Election 1977 ===
1977 Jammu and Kashmir Legislative Assembly election : Tral
Party	Candidate	Votes	%	±%
JKNC	Mohammed Subhan Bhat	13,315	46.05%	New
Independent	Ali Muhammad Naik	11,859	41.02%	New
JI	Ghulam Rasool	2,685	9.29%	▼3.42
JP	Mohan Singh	1,054	3.65%	New
Margin of victory		1,456	5.04%	▼35.87
Turnout		28,913	84.72%	▲10.31
Registered electors		35,073		▲39.86
JKNC gain from Independent		Swing	▼18.05	

=== Assembly Election 1972 ===
1972 Jammu and Kashmir Legislative Assembly election : Tral
Party	Candidate	Votes	%	±%
Independent	Ali Muhammad Naik	11,594	64.10%	New
INC	Ghulam Hassan Beg	4,195	23.19%	▼4.66
JI	Hakim Ghulam Nabi	2,299	12.71%	New
Margin of victory		7,399	40.91%	▼3.38
Turnout		18,088	75.09%	▼4.90
Registered electors		25,078		▲9.03
Independent hold		Swing		

=== Assembly Election 1967 ===
1967 Jammu and Kashmir Legislative Assembly election : Tral
Party	Candidate	Votes	%	±%
Independent	A. M. Naik	12,781	72.14%	New
INC	A. G. Trali	4,935	27.86%	New
Margin of victory		7,846	44.29%	
Turnout		17,716	78.99%	▲77.03
Registered electors		23,000		▼9.59
Independent gain from JKNC		Swing		

=== Assembly Election 1962 ===
1962 Jammu and Kashmir Legislative Assembly election : Tral
Party	Candidate	Votes	%	±%
JKNC	A. G. Trali	Unopposed		
Registered electors		25,441		
JKNC win (new seat)				

== See also ==
- Tral
- List of constituencies of Jammu and Kashmir Legislative Assembly
