= Fareed Parbati =

Fareed Parbati فرید پربتی
- Born: Ghulam Nabi Bhat; 4 August 1961; Jammu and Kashmir, India
- Died: 14 December 2011 (aged 50); Jammu and Kashmir, India
- Occupations: Poet, writer
- Known for: Work in Urdu Ruba'i

Fareed Parbati (Urdu: فرید پربتی), born Ghulam Nabi Bhat (Urdu: غلام نبی بھٹ) on 4 August 1961 died 14 December 2011, was an Indian Urdu language poet and writer from Jammu and Kashmir, India. He has written many books including poetry. He wrote in the form of poetry ghazal and Ruba'i. He was honoured with several awards including award by Academy of Art, Culture and Languages to recognise his literary work.

== Personal life ==
Parbati was born on 4 August 1961 in Kashmir. He received his graduation in commerce from Islamia College of Science and Commerce. He obtained his M.A, and M.Phil degrees from University of Kashmir. He also received PhD in Urdu from Kashmir University in 1995. After his study he served in Kashmir Accounts Services. Later he joined as the Assistant Professor at the Department of Urdu, University of Kashmir from 2001 to 2006. He also served as Associate Professor at Iqbal Institute of Culture and Philosophy (IICP) from 2006 till his death.

== Literary career ==
Parbati has written 14 books including eight poetry collections and others on criticism. His best work is on "Urdu Ruba't" that is widely appreciated. His interested form of poetry was classical Ruba'i and ghazal, he has also good knowledge of the poetry metre. He has received awards by several Institutions including Academy of Art, Culture and Languages. Parbati was acclaimed poet and writer. He was also ranked among the best writers in Urdu language.. He attended several prominent universities of the country to deliver lectures on Urdu literature.

== Awards ==
- Academy of Art, Culture and Languages.

== Bibliography ==
- Aabi-Neesaan 1992
- Isbaat 1997
- Farid Nama 2003
- Guftgoo Chaand Se 2005
- Hazaar Imkaan (poetic collection) 2006
- Khbari Tahayur 2007
- Hajoom-I-Aaina 2010 * Hazaar Imkaan Kulyaat (collection) 2011

== See also ==
- List of Urdu language poets
