= Mushtaq Ahmad Shah =

Indian politician (born 1955)

Mushtaq Ahmad Shah (born 1955) is an Indian politician from Jammu and Kashmir. He was an MLA from Tral Assembly constituency in Pulwama district. He won the 2014 Jammu and Kashmir Legislative Assembly election representing the Jammu and Kashmir People's Democratic Party.

== Early life and education ==
Shah is from Tral, Pulwama district, Jammu and Kashmir. He is the son of Abdul Majeed Shah. His wife is a teacher. He completed his M.A. in Urdu at Kashmir University.

== Electoral performance ==
Election	Constituency	Party	Result	Votes %	Opposition Candidate	Opposition Party	Opposition vote %	Ref
2014	Tral	JKPDP	Won	38.56%	Mohammed Ashraf Bhat	JKNC	25.80%	
2008	Tral	JKPDP	Won	28.47%	Mohammed Ashraf Bhat	JKNC	18.04%	

== Career ==
Shah won from Tral Assembly constituency representing Jammu and Kashmir People's Democratic Party in the 2014 Jammu and Kashmir Legislative Assembly election. He polled 12,415 votes and defeated his nearest rival, Mohd Ashraf Bhat of the Jammu and Kashmir National Conference, by a margin of 4,110 votes.
