= Ali Muhammad Naik =

Indian politician

Ali Muhammad Naik was a member of the Indian parliament. Naik was among several National Conference (NC) lawmakers who abandoned Farooq Abdullah and helped topple his government by allying with Ghulam Mohammad Shah. Shah later appointed him as Revenue Minister. Post-1990, Naik, along with many others, returned to National Conference, contested and were elected to the assembly. He served as speaker of the state assembly and was also elected as a Member of Parliament after defeating Mufti Mohammad Syed in the Anantnag constituency. Naik was a member of the Jammu & Kashmir National Conference party. He survived a militant attack in 2006 near Tral bus stand. He died in 2017.

== Electoral performance ==
Election	Constituency	Party	Result	Votes %	Opposition Candidate	Opposition Party	Opposition vote %	Ref
1996	Tral	JKNC	Won	77.92%	Krishan Singh	JKNPP	7.29%	
1987	Tral	Independent	Lost	28.82%	Ghulam Nabi Naik	INC	35.17%	
1983	Tral	Independent	Won	61.05%	Mohammed Subhan Bhat	JKNC	38.95%	
1977	Tral	Independent	Lost	41.02%	Mohammed Subhan Bhat	JKNC	46.05%	
1972	Tral	Independent	Won	64.10%	Ghulam Hassan Beg	INC	23.19%	
