= List of political parties in Jammu and Kashmir (princely state) =

== Activist groups prior to 1930 ==
- Dogra Sadar Sabha. Founded in 1905 by Lala Hansraj. It mainly represented the Hindus of the Jammu Province, even though it was not sectarian in character.
- Sanatana Dharma Yuvak Sabha, often called the Yuvak Sabha. Founded by Pandit Damodar Bhat Hanjura in the Kashmir Valley, the party represented the interests of Kashmiri Hindus.
- Kisan Mazdoor Party. Founded in 1925 under the leadership of Sardar Budh Singh.

== Major political parties ==
- All Jammu and Kashmir National Conference. Originally founded under the name All Jammu and Kashmir Muslim Conference in 1932 by Sheikh Abdullah and Chaudhry Ghulam Abbas, the organisation renamed itself as "National Conference" in 1939 and joined the All India States Peoples Conference (allied to the Indian National Congress). The organisation continued its prominent role in the state after its accession to India.
- All Jammu and Kashmir Muslim Conference. Breakaway group of the National Conference, revived under the old name of the party in 1941. The principal leader was Chaudhry Ghulam Abbas. The party allied itself with the All-India Muslim League and advocated accession to Pakistan in 1947. It spearheaded the Azad Kashmir rebellion in 1947, leading to the region's secession from the state. The party continued to be the predominant party in Azad Kashmir after it came under Pakistani control.
- All Jammu and Kashmir Rajya Hindu Sabha. Founding year unknown. It is believed to have been affiliated to the Akhil Bharatiya Hindu Mahasabha, founded in 1909. Led by Prem Nath Dogra in 1947, it supported the independence of the princely state. After the state's accession to India, it largely merged into the Jammu Praja Parishad.
- Kashmir Socialist Party and Kisan Mazdoor Conference. Founded by Prem Nath Bazaz, who advocated the accession of the state to Pakistan until 1964.

== Bibliography ==
- Chowdhary, Rekha (2015), Jammu and Kashmir: Politics of Identity and Separatism, Routledge, ISBN 978-1-317-41405-6
- Copland, Ian (1981), "Islam and Political Mobilization in Kashmir, 1931-34", Pacific Affairs, 54 (2): 228–259, doi:10.2307/2757363, JSTOR 2757363
- Kaur, Ravinderjit (1996), Political Awakening in Kashmir, APH Publishing, ISBN 978-81-7024-709-8
- Khan, Ghulam Hassan (1980), Freedom movement in Kashmir, 1931-1940, Light & Life Publishers
- Parashar, Parmanand (2004), Kashmir and the Freedom Movement, Sarup & Sons, ISBN 978-81-7625-514-1
- Puri, Balraj (November 2010), "The Question of Accession", Epilogue, 4 (11): 4–6
- Puri, Luv (2013), Across the Line of Control: Inside Azad Kashmir, Columbia University Press, ISBN 978-0-231-80084-6
- Zutshi, Chitralekha (2004), Languages of Belonging: Islam, Regional Identity, and the Making of Kashmir, C. Hurst & Co. Publishers, ISBN 978-1-85065-700-2
