= Janak Raj Gupta =

Indian politician, lawyer and social worker

- Born: 27 May 1936; India
- Died: 13 September 2015 (aged 79)
- Occupations: Politician, lawyer and social worker
- Known for: Congress leader, 2 time MP from Jammu Poonch Lok Sabha Constituency

Janak Raj Gupta (1936–2015) was an Indian politician, lawyer and social worker. He was a congress leader and a Member of parliament (MP) from Jammu Poonch Lok Sabha Constituency for a record of two times.

== Career ==
=== Politics ===
Gupta served as Deputy Speaker, Jammu and Kashmir Legislative Assembly, from 1977 till 1983.

In his previous association with political parties, he served as General Secretary for PCC (I), Jammu and Kashmir. He served as president for DCC(I), Jammu for ten years. He served as Treasurer for PCC(l), J&K. He was also a Member, Executive Committee for CPP(I) in 1990.

Gupta was a member of Legislative Council, Jammu and Kashmir from 1969 till 1975. He was a Member of 8th and 9th Lok Sabha, from 1985 till 1986. He was a member of Legislative Assembly, Jammu and Kashmir from 1977 till 1983. He also served in the same capacity from 1983 till 1985.

For a greater part of his political career, he served as a political advisor to former chief minister Ghulam Nabi Azad.

=== Committee service ===
Gupta served in the following capacities:

- Member, Library Committee, Jammu and Kashmir Legislative Assembly
- Chairman, Committee on Estimates
- Business Advisory Committee and Joint Committee on Railways Bill, 8th Lok Sabha
- Member, Committee on Absence of Members from the Sittings of House, 19 January 1990
- Consultative Committee, Ministry of Steel and Mines, 1990

== Social service ==
Gupta sought for the social welfare of the Harijans, especially, the less privileged and the homeless people in Jammu and Kashmir villages. He worked with the Red Cross and Cooperative Movements towards bringing succor to the people. He also worked with various social organizations such as Servants of the People Society (SOPS) towards rendering help to the people. Gupta served as the chairman, F.S.U. J&K State. He also served as the chairman, Bharat Sevak Samaj, J&K State.

== Death ==
Gupta died on 13 September 2015, after suffering a cardiac arrest at Government Medical College, Jammu.

== Personal life ==
Gupta was married to his wife; Uma Gupta. The couple had five children, two sons namely; Vicky Mahajan and Sahil Mahajan and three daughters namely; Saloni Mahajan, Seetu Kohli and Vasundhara.

== See also ==
- 1984 Indian general election in Jammu and Kashmir
- Jammu and Kashmir Legislative Assembly
- List of members of the 8th Lok Sabha
- List of members of the 9th Lok Sabha
