= Rajinder Singh Chib =

Indian politician

R.S. Chib

General Secretary of Democratic Azad Party
- Incumbent
- Assumed office 26 September 2022
- Preceded by: Post-established

Personal details
- Born: 1942 (age 83–84)
- Party: Democratic Azad Party
- Other political affiliations: Bhartiya Janata Party (until 2002), Indian National Congress (2002-2022)
- Children: Vivek Chib, Kunal Chib
- Education: Birla Institute of Technology and Science, Pilani and Indian Institute of Science

Rajinder Singh Chib (born 1942, also known as R.S. Chib) is an Indian politician and former Indian Air Force officer. He is a member of the Democratic Progressive Azad Party. Chib served as Cabinet Minister of Health, Tourism, Medical Education and Environment in the Jammu and Kashmir cabinet from 1986 to 1990 and was reappointed as cabinet Minister of Technical Education, Medical Education and Youth Affairs and Sports from 2009 to 2014. On 3 October 2022, Chib was appointed as General Secretary for Democratic Azad Party.

== Political career ==
R.S. Chib started his political career with the Jammu and Kashmir National Conference and served as cabinet minister in the Jammu and Kashmir government from 1986 to 1990. He quit from his posts and the party after accusing it of neglecting ex-servicemen and displaced persons.

He then joined the Janata Dal when V. P. Singh was the Prime Minister of India and unsuccessfully contested Lok Sabha elections from Jammu, Udhampur and Gurdaspur. After the Janata Dal's dissolution in 1999, Chib joined the Bhartiya Janata Party.

In 2002, Chib fought the Jammu and Kashmir Legislative Assembly elections from the Suchetgarh Assembly constituency but lost. He later joined the Indian National Congress. He has also served as Vice President and General Secretary for the Jammu and Kashmir Pradesh Congress Committee.

After Ghulam Nabi Azad resigned from the Indian National Congress in August 2022, Chib was among the former ministers who resigned in support of Azad. He became a member of the Democratic Azad Party.

On 3 October 2022, R.S. Chib was appointed as General Secretary for Democratic Azad Party.

== Personal life ==
Chib was born in Watala Bhimber (now in Pakistan Administered Kashmir). He pursued his B.E. degree from Birla Institute of Technology and Science, Pilani and post graduation from Indian Institute of Science. He also got fellowship in Institution of Electronics and Telecommunication Engineers. He served as an honorary professor in Rajouri's Baba Ghulam Shah Badshah University.

He is married to Usha Chib and has two sons, Vivek and Kunal. Vivek Chib is senior advocate designated by the Delhi High Court and Kunal Chib is a businessman and the president of the J&K Power Lifting Association.
