= Mohammad Shafi Qureshi =

Indian politician and statesman

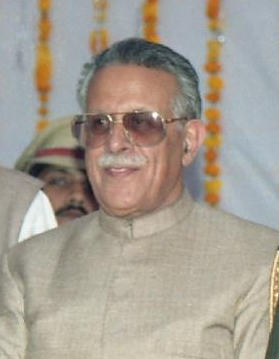

11th Governor of Madhya Pradesh
- In office 24 June 1993 – 21 April 1998
- Chief Minister: Digvijaya Singh
- Preceded by: M. A. Khan
- Succeeded by: Bhai Mahavir

Governor of Uttar Pradesh (Acting)
- In office 3 May 1996–19 July 1996 & 17 March 1998 - 19 April 1998
- Chief Minister: Vacant and & Kalyan Singh
- Preceded by: Motilal Vora
- Succeeded by: Romesh Bhandari

16th Governor of Bihar
- In office 19 March 1991 – 13 August 1993
- Chief Minister: Lalu Prasad Yadav
- Preceded by: B. Satya Narayan Reddy (Acting)
- Succeeded by: Akhlaqur Rahman Kidwai

5th Minister of Tourism
- In office 30 July 1979 – 14 January 1980
- Prime Minister: Charan Singh
- Preceded by: Purushottam Kaushik
- Succeeded by: Janaki Ballabh Patnaik

Deputy Minister of Railways
- In office 10 October 1974 – March 1977
- Prime Minister: Indira Gandhi

Deputy Minister of Steel & Heavy Industries
- In office 15 May 1969 – 2 May 1971
- Prime Minister: Indira Gandhi

Deputy Minister of Commerce
- In office 28 January 1966 – 14 February 1969
- Prime Minister: Indira Gandhi

Personal details
- Born: 24 November 1928 Jammu and Kashmir, British India
- Died: 28 August 2016 (aged 87) New Delhi, India
- Party: Indian National Congress

Mohammad Shafi Qureshi (24 November 1928 – 28 August 2016) was an Indian politician and statesman from Kashmir and the founder of the Congress Party in the Indian state of Jammu and Kashmir.

== Life ==
He was born on 24 November 1928 in Srinagar, Kashmir to Mohammad Amin Abbasi who was the first transporter of Union Council Birote, near Kohala Bridge District Abbottabad, Pakistan before 1947. He studied in Tyndale Biscoe School. He has served in various capacities in his long and very active political career. He was elected to Rajya Sabha from Jammu and Kashmir in 1965 and later elected to Lok Sabha from Anantnag in 1971 and 1977 elections. He was the Union Deputy Minister of Commerce from 28 January 1966 to 14 February 1969, Union Deputy Minister for Steel & Heavy Engineering from 15 February 1969 to 2 May 1971, Union Deputy Minister for Railways from 10 October 1974 to March 1977, Minister of Tourism & Civil Aviation (31 July 1979). He held the post of Governor of Bihar on 19 March 1991 to 13 August 1993 and was sworn in as Governor of Madhya Pradesh on 24 June '93, sworn in as Governor of Uttar Pradesh on 3 May 1996 to 19 July 1996.

He was the secretary of the Faculty of Law, Aligarh Muslim University in the year 1953.

He was the Chairperson of the National Commission for Minorities from 3 September 2007 with the rank of Cabinet Minister until Wajahat Habibullah took over.

He died on 28 August 2016 in Delhi's Batra hospital. Jammu and Kashmir's chief minister Mehbooba Mufti, Governor N. N. Vohra condoled his death.
