= Anantnag Lok Sabha constituency =

Former Lok Sabha Constituency in Jammu and Kashmir

Coordinates: 33.73°N 75.15°E

Anantnag
- Former Lok Sabha constituency

Constituency details
- Country: India
- Region: North India
- Union Territory: Jammu and Kashmir
- Established: 1967
- Abolished: 2024

Anantnag was a Lok Sabha constituency in Jammu and Kashmir in northern India. This constituency came into existence in 1967 and it was officially replaced and renamed as the Anantnag-Rajouri Constituency in May 2022.

== Assembly segments ==
Anantnag Lok Sabha constituency was composed of the following 16 assembly segments:

1. Tral
2. Pampore
3. Pulwama
4. Rajpora
5. Wachi
6. Shopian
7. Noorabad
8. Kulgam
9. Hom Shali Bugh
10. Anantnag
11. Devsar
12. Dooru
13. Kokernag
14. Shangus
15. Bijbehara
16. Pahalgam

== Members of Parliament ==
Year	Winner	Party
1967	Mohammad Shafi Qureshi	Indian National Congress
1971	Mohammad Shafi Qureshi	Indian National Congress
1977	Mohammad Shafi Qureshi	Indian National Congress
1980	Ghulam Rasool Kochak	Jammu & Kashmir National Conference
1984	Begum Akbar Jahan Abdullah	Jammu & Kashmir National Conference
1989	Piyare Lal Handoo	Jammu & Kashmir National Conference
1996	Mohammad Maqbool Dar	Janata Dal
1998	Mufti Mohammad Sayeed	Indian National Congress
1999	Ali Muhammad Naik	Jammu & Kashmir National Conference
2004	Mehbooba Mufti	Jammu & Kashmir People's Democratic Party
2009	Mirza Mehboob Beg	Jammu & Kashmir National Conference
2014	Mehbooba Mufti	Jammu & Kashmir People's Democratic Party
2019	Hasnain Masoodi	Jammu & Kashmir National Conference

== Election results ==
Vote share of Winning candidates
2019	32.17%
2014	53.41%
2009	46.53%
2004	49.55%
1999	37.66%
1998	55.91%
1996	32.76%
1989	97.69%
1984	58.51%
1980	60.47%
1977	32.07%
1971	60.30%
1967	0.00%

=== 2019 ===
2019 Indian general elections: Anantnag
Party	Candidate	Votes	%	±%
JKNC	Hasnain Masoodi	40,180	32.17	−3.81
INC	Ghulam Ahmad Mir	33,504	26.83	New
JKPDP	Mehbooba Mufti	30,524	24.44	−28.97
BJP	Sofi Yousuf	10,225	8.19	+6.93
JKPC	Ch. Zaffar Ali	1,646	1.32	New
NOTA	None of the Above	937	0.75	
Majority		6,676	5.34	−12.09
Turnout		1,24,896	8.96	−19.88
JKNC gain from JKPDP		Swing		

=== 2014 ===
2014 Indian general elections: Anantnag
Party	Candidate	Votes	%	±%
JKPDP	Mehbooba Mufti	2,00,429	53.41	+8.51
JKNC	Mirza Mehboob Beg	1,35,012	35.98	−10.55
Independent	Tanveer Hussain Khan	7,340	1.96	New
BJP	Mushtaq Ahmad Malik	4,720	1.26	+0.03
JKNPP	Syed Abid Ahmad Shah	4,345	1.16	New
NOTA	None of the Above	5,936	1.58	New
Majority		65,417	17.43	+15.80
Turnout		3,75,279	28.84	+1.74
JKPDP gain from JKNC		Swing	+6.88	

=== 2009 ===
2009 Indian general elections: Anantnag
Party	Candidate	Votes	%	±%
JKNC	Mirza Mehboob Beg	148,317	46.53	+22.90
JKPDP	Peer Mohammed Hussain	143,093	44.90	−4.65
BJP	Mohammad Sidiq Khan	3,918	1.23	−1.99
Majority		5,224	1.63	−24.29
Turnout		318,726	27.10	+12.06
JKNC gain from JKPDP		Swing		

=== 2004 ===
2004 Indian general election: Anantnag
Party	Candidate	Votes	%	±%
JKPDP	Mehbooba Mufti	74,436	49.55	
JKNC	Dr. Mehboob Beg	35,498	23.63	
CPI(M)	Mohamad Yusuf Tarigami	18,466	12.29	
BJP	Sofi Mohd. Yousuf	4,836	3.22	
IND	Imtiyaz Ahmad Rather	2,827	1.88	
IND	Ab. Majeed Naikoo	2,760	1.84	
IND	Mohd. Maqbool Dar	2,691	1.79	
LJP	Sanjay Saraf	1,595	1.06	
IND	Gh. Rasool	1,586	1.06	
AIFB	Hamidullah Wani	1,504	1.00	
IND	Gh. Mohi-ud-Din Dar	1,278	0.85	
RLD	Mohd. Yousuf Qurashi	1,115	0.74	
SAP	Gh. Mohd. Tantary	864	0.58	
IND	Ramesh Kumar Bhat	763	0.51	
Majority		38,938	25.92	
Turnout		150,219	15.04	
Swing to JKPDP from JKNC		Swing		

=== 1999 ===
1999 Indian general election: Anantnag
Party	Candidate	Votes	%	±%
JKNC	Ali Mohd Naik	38,745	37.66	
IND	Mufti Mohmad Syeed	25,253	24.55	
CPI(M)	Mohmad Yousuf	15,649	15.21	
INC	Peerzada Mohammad Syeed	9,321	9.06	
JKAL	Altaf Mohammad Padder	2,882	2.80	
JD(U)	Mohd Maqbool Dar	2,193	2.13	
JP	Ajay Sharma	1,772	1.72	
AJKPPF (Note: All J & K Peoples Patriotic Front)	Ghulam Nabi Mir (Azad)	1,500	1.46	
BJP	Showkat Hussain Yani	1,053	1.02	
JKNPP	Yussaf	866	0.84	
SJP(R)	Bashir Ahmad	725	0.70	
SPSP (Note: Sirpanch Samaj Party)	Mushtaq Ahmad Khanday	697	0.68	
JD(S)	Peerzada Abdul Hamid	674	0.66	
IND	Hafeeza Begum	450	0.44	
IND	Bashir Ahmad	413	0.40	
IND	Abdul Aziz	288	0.28	
RLD	Aisha	263	0.26	
LS	Rashid Bhat	133	0.13	
Majority		13,492	13.11	
Turnout		115,243	14.32	
Swing to JKNC from INC		Swing		

=== 1998 ===
1998 Indian general election: Anantnag
Party	Candidate	Votes	%	±%
INC	Mufti Mohmad Sayeed	120,444	55.91	
JKNC	Mohd. Yusuf Teng	68,444	31.77	
JD	Mohd. Maqbool Dar	10,818	5.02	
BJP	Showkat Hussain Wani	6,861	3.18	
RJD	Ghulam Nabi Khan	1,787	0.83	
IND	Dilawar	1,711	0.79	
AIIC(S)	Mohd. Akbar	1,365	0.63	
JKNPP	Mohd. Yussaf Ganie	1,194	0.55	
IND	Gh. Mohd. Lone	761	0.35	
IND	Bashir Ahmed Ahanger	635	0.29	
IND	Rakesh Pardesi	607	0.28	
IND	Altaf Ahmed	413	0.19	
IND	Abdul Rashid Lone	377	0.18	
Majority		52,000	24.14	
Turnout		226,597	28.15	
Swing to INC from JD		Swing		

=== 1996 ===
1996 Indian general election: Anantnag
Party	Candidate	Votes	%	±%
JD	Mohamad Maqbool	117,221	32.76	
INC	Taj Mohi-ud-Din	59,137	16.53	
BJP	Sarla Taploo	39,960	11.17	
IND	A. R. Misgar	29,070	8.12	
IND	Mohmad Rafiq	19,590	5.47	
JKNPP	Mohamad Yousf Ganai	15,445	4.32	
IND	Ghulam Nabi Wani	15,352	4.29	
IND	Ghulam Nabi Shah	13,726	3.84	
IND	S. K. Tickoo	12,590	3.52	
IND	Ramzan Bangi	8,133	2.27	
IND	Ali Mohamad Dar	5,959	1.67	
AIIC(T)	Mohamad Akbar	5,865	1.64	
IND	Bashir Ahamad	5,740	1.60	
IND	D. N. Raina	5,676	1.59	
IND	Abdul Ahad Wani	3,151	0.88	
IND	Abdul Qayum Khan	1,243	0.35	
Majority		58,084	16.23	
Turnout		383,861	50.20	
Swing to JD from JKNC		Swing		

=== 1991 ===
The 1991 Indian general election was not held in Jammu and Kashmir due to severe insurgency and the breakdown of law and order that peaked between 1990 and 1991. During this period, the state was under Governor's Rule and direct Central Government administration from January 1990 to October 1996, with Lok Sabha elections resuming only in May 1996.

=== 1989 ===
1989 Indian general election: Anantnag
Party	Candidate	Votes	%	±%
JKNC	P. L. Handoo	36,055	97.69	
IND	Abdul Rashid Khan	186	0.50	
IND	Abdul Gaini Bhat	164	0.44	
IND	Abdul Rashid Thoker	147	0.40	
IND	Mahinder Singh	118	0.32	
IND	Ghulam Haider	80	0.22	
IND	Mohamad Ahasan	62	0.17	
IND	Mohamad Amin Itoo	61	0.17	
IND	Mohamad Iqbal	34	0.09	
Majority		35,869	97.19	
Turnout		37,377	5.07	
JKNC hold		Swing		

=== 1984 ===
1984 Indian general election: Anantnag
Party	Candidate	Votes	%	±%
JKNC	Akbar Jahan Begum	240,973	58.51	
INC	Peer Hussan-ud-Din	158,963	38.60	
IND	Bashir Ahmad Mir	4,679	1.14	
IND	Mhd. Yousuf Wani	4,287	1.04	
IND	Vijay Kumar	2,924	0.71	
Majority		82,010	19.91	
Turnout		428,548	70.08	
JKNC hold		Swing		

=== 1980 ===
1980 Indian general election: Anantnag
Party	Candidate	Votes	%	±%
JKNC	Gh. Rasool Kochak	179,020	60.47	
IND	Ali Mohd. Naik	95,050	32.11	
INC(U)	Mohd. Shafi Qureshi	17,381	5.87	
IND	Mohd. Yosuf Mir	4,596	1.55	
Majority		83,970	28.36	
Turnout		306,998	60.06	
Swing to JKNC from INC		Swing		

=== 1977 ===
1977 Indian general election: Anantnag
Party	Candidate	Votes	%	±%
INC	Mohammad Shafi Qureshi	79,742	32.07	
IND	Ab. Razak Mir	71,411	28.72	
IND	Piyaray Lal Handoo	41,191	16.57	
IND	Ghulam Qadir Mir	33,891	13.63	
IND	Ghulam Hassan Inqalabi	22,415	9.01	
Majority		8,331	3.35	
Turnout		263,112	55.83	
INC hold		Swing		

=== 1971 ===
1971 Indian general election: Anantnag
Party	Candidate	Votes	%	±%
INC	Mohammad Shafi Qureshi	150,827	60.30	
IND	Peep Gulam Nabi Shah	90,434	36.15	
IND	Shamim Ahamed Shamim	8,887	3.55	
Majority		60,393	24.15	
Turnout		264,867	67.25	
INC hold		Swing		

=== 1967 ===
1967 Indian general election: Anantnag
Party	Candidate	Votes	%	±%
INC	Mohammad Shafi Qureshi	Unopposed	0.00	
Majority		Uncontested	0.00	
Turnout		0	0.00	
INC win (new seat)				

== See also ==
- Anantnag–Rajouri Lok Sabha constituency
- List of former constituencies of the Lok Sabha
