= Sheikh Abdul Rehman =

Indian politician and Partition survivor

President of the Jammu and Kashmir Bharatiya Jana Sangh
- In office 1972–1973
- Preceded by: Pandit Prem Nath Dogra
- Succeeded by: Dissolved

Member of the Jammu and Kashmir Legislative Assembly
- In office 1972–1977
- Constituency: Jammu North
- In office 1996–2002
- Constituency: Bhaderwah

Member of Parliament, Rajya Sabha
- Constituency: Uttar Pradesh

Personal details
- Born: 1933 (age 92–93) Bhaderwah, British India
- Party: Jammu and Kashmir National Conference
- Other political affiliations: Bharatiya Jana Sangh (formerly); Bharatiya Lok Dal; Bahujan Samaj Party
- Profession: Politician

Sheikh Abdul Rehman (born 1933) is an Indian politician, survivor of the Indian partition, and former member of parliament and the legislative assembly from Jammu and Kashmir. He is notably recognized as the only Muslim to have served as the president of the Jammu and Kashmir unit of the Bharatiya Jana Sangh (BJS), the predecessor to the Bharatiya Janata Party (BJP). Rehman has had a long and diverse political career, having been associated with several parties, including the Bharatiya Lok Dal, Bahujan Samaj Party (BSP), and National Conference (NC).

== Early life and partition ==
Sheikh Abdul Rehman was born in 1931 in Khalu village, Bhaderwah, Jammu and Kashmir. He experienced significant trauma during the Partition of India in 1947, losing 16 family members, including his parents and siblings, to violence.

Rehman attended school until Class 10 but could not continue due to the upheaval caused by Partition. In his teenage years, he became involved with the National Conference (NC) and led its Bhaderwah student wing. He was entrusted with delivering messages to Sheikh Mohammad Abdullah, the NC founder and then Chief Minister of Jammu and Kashmir, who was imprisoned in Bhaderwah at the time.

== Entry into politics ==
During the Partition, Rehman grew disillusioned with the National Conference, particularly after the party's local leadership failed to act against communal violence and crimes in Bhaderwah. He left the NC and was subsequently approached by Swami Raj, a leader of the Jammu Praja Parishad, an organization advocating for the integration of Jammu and Kashmir with India. Rehman joined the Praja Parishad and became its Bhaderwah in-charge.

As a member of the Praja Parishad, Rehman worked underground during agitations for the state's full integration into India. When the Praja Parishad merged with the Bharatiya Jana Sangh, Rehman became an active member of the latter.

== Political career ==
Rehman achieved several milestones during his political career:

- In 1972, he was elected as the MLA from Jammu North (now Jammu East and Jammu West) on a Bharatiya Jana Sangh ticket. He was the first and only Muslim to win from this predominantly Hindu constituency. This seat was previously represented by Pandit Prem Nath Dogra, a key Jana Sangh leader, who personally endorsed Rehman's candidacy and symbolically anointed him as his political successor.
- The same year, he became the president of the Jammu and Kashmir unit of the Bharatiya Jana Sangh, a role he retained until 1973.

=== Resignation from the Jana Sangh ===
In 1973, internal disputes arose within the Jana Sangh's Jammu and Kashmir unit. The party’s national leadership dissolved the state working committee following disagreements over general secretary elections. Rehman opposed the dissolution as unconstitutional and subsequently resigned from his position. This marked his departure from the Jana Sangh.

=== Shift to other parties ===
Rehman joined Chaudhary Charan Singh's Bharatiya Lok Dal and was fielded as the joint Janata Party candidate for the Jammu-Poonch Lok Sabha constituency in the 1977 general elections, though he did not win. Later, Charan Singh sent him to the Rajya Sabha from Uttar Pradesh.

In 1990, Rehman joined the Bahujan Samaj Party (BSP) and successfully contested the Bhaderwah Assembly seat in 1996. Around 2011–2012, he returned to the National Conference, completing a full circle in his political journey.

== Electoral performance ==
Election	Constituency	Party	Result	Votes %	Opposition Candidate	Opposition Party	Opposition vote %	Ref
2002	Bhaderwah	BSP	Lost	7.50%	Mohammed Sharief	INC	34.18%	
1996	Bhaderwah	BSP	Won	51.23%	Daya Krishan Kotwal	BJP	40.91%	
1972	Jammu North	ABJS	Won	60.23%	Nilam Ber Dev Sharma	INC	36.75%	

== Controversies and detention ==
In October 2023, Rehman, then aged 92, was detained overnight by the police in Jammu. The detention occurred ahead of a solidarity meeting for residents of Gaza amid the ongoing Israel-Hamas conflict. Although no formal charges were filed, Rehman expressed frustration over his detention, stating, “At least tell me what I did wrong.”
