= Akhnoor Assembly constituency =

Constituency of the Jammu and Kashmir legislative assembly in India

Coordinates: 32.90°N 74.74°E

Akhnoor
- Constituency No. 81 for the Jammu and Kashmir Legislative Assembly

Constituency details
- Country: India
- State: Jammu and Kashmir
- District: Jammu
- Lok Sabha constituency: Jammu
- Established: 1962
- Reservation: SC

Member of Legislative Assembly
- Incumbent Mohan Lal
- Party: BJP
- Alliance: NDA
- Elected year: 2024

Akhnoor Assembly constituency is one of the 90 constituencies in the Jammu and Kashmir Legislative Assembly of Jammu and Kashmir a north state of India. Akhnoor is also part of Jammu Lok Sabha constituency.

== Members of the Legislative Assembly ==
| Election | Member | Party |
|---|---|---|
| 1962 | Shiv Ram | Jammu & Kashmir National Conference |
| 1967 | Dharam Pal | Indian National Congress |
| 1972 | Dharam Pal | Indian National Congress |
| 1977 | Dharam Pal | Indian National Congress |
| 1983 | Dharam Pal | Indian National Congress |
| 1987 | Govind Ram Sharma | Independent politician |
| 1996 | Govind Ram Sharma | Jammu & Kashmir National Conference |
| 2002 | Madan Lal Sharma | Indian National Congress |
| 2004 By-election | Sham Lal Sharma | Indian National Congress |
| 2008 | Sham Lal Sharma | Indian National Congress |
| 2014 | Rajeev Sharma | Bharatiya Janata Party |
| 2024 | Mohan Lal | Bharatiya Janata Party |

== Election results ==
=== Assembly Election 2024 ===
2024 Jammu and Kashmir Legislative Assembly election : Akhnoor
| Party | Candidate | Votes | % | ±% |
|---|---|---|---|---|
| BJP | Mohan Lal | 49,927 | 64.87% | ▲11.68 |
| INC | Ashok Kumar | 25,248 | 32.81% | ▼8.48 |
| BSP | Chittar Manu | 1,009 | 1.31% | ▲0.04 |
| NOTA | None of the Above | 778 | 1.01% | ▲0.46 |
| Margin of victory | | 24,679 | 32.07% | ▲20.16 |
| Turnout | | 76,962 | 80.79% | ▼0.32 |
| Registered electors | | 95,265 | | ▼1.92 |
| BJP hold | | Swing | ▲11.68 | |

=== Assembly Election 2014 ===
2014 Jammu and Kashmir Legislative Assembly election : Akhnoor
| Party | Candidate | Votes | % | ±% |
|---|---|---|---|---|
| BJP | Rajeev Sharma | 41,901 | 53.19% | ▲26.30 |
| INC | Sham Lal Sharma | 32,521 | 41.29% | ▼6.69 |
| JKPDP | Dev Raj | 1,291 | 1.64% | New |
| BSP | Raj Kumar | 1,003 | 1.27% | ▼8.85 |
| JKNC | Dr. Gafoor Ahmed | 859 | 1.09% | ▼6.20 |
| NOTA | None of the Above | 436 | 0.55% | New |
| Margin of victory | | 9,380 | 11.91% | ▼9.17 |
| Turnout | | 78,771 | 81.10% | ▲1.42 |
| Registered electors | | 97,125 | | ▲17.48 |
| BJP gain from INC | | Swing | ▲5.22 | |

=== Assembly Election 2008 ===
2008 Jammu and Kashmir Legislative Assembly election : Akhnoor
| Party | Candidate | Votes | % | ±% |
|---|---|---|---|---|
| INC | Sham Lal Sharma | 31,600 | 47.97% | ▲16.78 |
| BJP | Govind Ram Sharma | 17,716 | 26.89% | ▲8.67 |
| BSP | Vijay Kumar | 6,668 | 10.12% | ▼7.37 |
| JKNC | Ram Saroop | 4,802 | 7.29% | ▲5.11 |
| NCP | Kuldeep Sharma | 1,088 | 1.65% | New |
| Independent | Harbans Kumar Sharma | 633 | 0.96% | New |
| Independent | Santosh Kumar Sharma | 490 | 0.74% | New |
| Margin of victory | | 13,884 | 21.08% | ▲14.61 |
| Turnout | | 65,872 | 79.68% | ▲15.28 |
| Registered electors | | 82,673 | | ▼3.73 |
| INC hold | | Swing | ▲16.78 | |

=== Assembly By-election 2004 ===
2004 Jammu and Kashmir Legislative Assembly by-election : Akhnoor
| Party | Candidate | Votes | % | ±% |
|---|---|---|---|---|
| INC | Sham Lal Sharma | 17,251 | 31.19% | ▲1.83 |
| Independent | Govind Ram Sharma | 13,675 | 24.73% | New |
| BJP | Ram Saroop | 10,078 | 18.22% | ▲3.29 |
| BSP | Dr. Gafoor Ahmed | 9,674 | 17.49% | ▲0.77 |
| JKNC | Baldev Singh | 1,207 | 2.18% | ▼25.35 |
| Independent | Kuldeep Sharma | 902 | 1.63% | New |
| Independent | M S Jamwal | 509 | 0.92% | New |
| JKNPP | Ashok Kumar | 474 | 0.86% | New |
| Independent | Raghbir Singh | 391 | 0.71% | New |
| Independent | Suram Singh | 391 | 0.71% | New |
| Margin of victory | | 3,576 | 6.47% | ▲4.64 |
| Turnout | | 55,302 | 64.40% | ▼6.81 |
| Registered electors | | 85,878 | | ▲5.00 |
| INC hold | | Swing | ▲1.83 | |

=== Assembly Election 2002 ===
2002 Jammu and Kashmir Legislative Assembly election : Akhnoor
| Party | Candidate | Votes | % | ±% |
|---|---|---|---|---|
| INC | Madan Lal Sharma | 17,102 | 29.36% | ▲11.69 |
| JKNC | Govind Ram Sharma | 16,037 | 27.54% | ▲6.51 |
| BSP | Dr. Gafoor Ahmed | 9,737 | 16.72% | ▼1.53 |
| BJP | Ram Saroop | 8,700 | 14.94% | ▼5.44 |
| Independent | Kuldeep Sharma | 4,891 | 8.40% | New |
| JKPDP | Devinder Kumar | 539 | 0.93% | New |
| SAP | Roshan Lal | 481 | 0.83% | New |
| Margin of victory | | 1,065 | 1.83% | ▲1.18 |
| Turnout | | 58,242 | 71.27% | ▼0.61 |
| Registered electors | | 81,788 | | ▲39.46 |
| INC gain from JKNC | | Swing | ▲8.34 | |

=== Assembly Election 1996 ===
1996 Jammu and Kashmir Legislative Assembly election : Akhnoor
| Party | Candidate | Votes | % | ±% |
|---|---|---|---|---|
| JKNC | Govind Ram Sharma | 8,855 | 21.02% | New |
| BJP | Ram Saroop | 8,583 | 20.38% | ▲18.74 |
| BSP | Lakhbir Singh | 7,684 | 18.24% | New |
| INC | Dharam Pal | 7,443 | 17.67% | ▼10.21 |
| Independent | Kuldeep Sharma | 6,401 | 15.20% | New |
| Independent | Ashok Kumar | 2,058 | 4.89% | New |
| JD | Sat Pal | 738 | 1.75% | New |
| Margin of victory | | 272 | 0.65% | ▼30.99 |
| Turnout | | 42,119 | 72.71% | ▼6.12 |
| Registered electors | | 58,647 | | ▲38.52 |
| JKNC gain from Independent | | Swing | ▼38.50 | |

=== Assembly Election 1987 ===
1987 Jammu and Kashmir Legislative Assembly election : Akhnoor
| Party | Candidate | Votes | % | ±% |
|---|---|---|---|---|
| Independent | Govind Ram Sharma | 19,642 | 59.52% | New |
| INC | Dharam Pal | 9,202 | 27.88% | ▼17.78 |
| Independent | Shiv Ram | 1,712 | 5.19% | New |
| JKNPP | Mohan Lal | 1,073 | 3.25% | New |
| BJP | Madan Lal | 540 | 1.64% | ▼7.52 |
| JP | Jagdish Raj | 332 | 1.01% | New |
| Margin of victory | | 10,440 | 31.64% | ▲19.26 |
| Turnout | | 33,000 | 79.78% | ▲2.79 |
| Registered electors | | 42,339 | | ▲11.20 |
| Independent gain from INC | | Swing | ▲13.85 | |

=== Assembly Election 1983 ===
1983 Jammu and Kashmir Legislative Assembly election : Akhnoor
| Party | Candidate | Votes | % | ±% |
|---|---|---|---|---|
| INC | Dharam Pal | 13,067 | 45.67% | ▲8.00 |
| JKNC | Govind Ram Sharma | 9,527 | 33.29% | ▲28.26 |
| BJP | Dewan Chand | 2,621 | 9.16% | New |
| Independent | Mohan Lal | 2,126 | 7.43% | New |
| Independent | Madan Lal Verma | 805 | 2.81% | New |
| Independent | Rajinder Singh | 192 | 0.67% | New |
| Margin of victory | | 3,540 | 12.37% | ▼5.59 |
| Turnout | | 28,614 | 76.64% | ▲5.90 |
| Registered electors | | 38,073 | | ▲15.02 |
| INC hold | | Swing | ▲8.00 | |

=== Assembly Election 1977 ===
1977 Jammu and Kashmir Legislative Assembly election : Akhnoor
| Party | Candidate | Votes | % | ±% |
|---|---|---|---|---|
| INC | Dharam Pal | 8,635 | 37.67% | ▼37.34 |
| Independent | Govind Ram Sharma | 4,517 | 19.70% | New |
| JP | Dewan Chand | 4,342 | 18.94% | New |
| Independent | Kuldip Kumar | 4,276 | 18.65% | New |
| JKNC | Pritam Lal | 1,154 | 5.03% | New |
| Margin of victory | | 4,118 | 17.96% | ▼40.65 |
| Turnout | | 22,924 | 70.63% | ▼6.93 |
| Registered electors | | 33,101 | | ▲15.60 |
| INC hold | | Swing | ▼37.34 | |

=== Assembly Election 1972 ===
1972 Jammu and Kashmir Legislative Assembly election : Akhnoor
| Party | Candidate | Votes | % | ±% |
|---|---|---|---|---|
| INC | Dharam Pal | 16,364 | 75.01% | ▲14.57 |
| ABJS | Bakshi Thakur Das | 3,577 | 16.40% | ▼1.42 |
| Independent | Hari Chand | 1,020 | 4.68% | New |
| INC(O) | Dina Nath | 854 | 3.91% | New |
| Margin of victory | | 12,787 | 58.62% | ▲15.99 |
| Turnout | | 21,815 | 78.45% | ▼0.16 |
| Registered electors | | 28,635 | | ▲17.27 |
| INC hold | | Swing | ▲14.57 | |

=== Assembly Election 1967 ===
1967 Jammu and Kashmir Legislative Assembly election : Akhnoor
| Party | Candidate | Votes | % | ±% |
|---|---|---|---|---|
| INC | Dharam Pal | 11,267 | 60.45% | New |
| ABJS | K. Lal | 3,322 | 17.82% | New |
| Independent | S. Ram | 2,327 | 12.48% | New |
| Democratic National Conference | R. Chand | 1,000 | 5.36% | ▲2.76 |
| JKNC | S. Singh | 377 | 2.02% | ▼58.81 |
| Independent | D. Nath | 347 | 1.86% | New |
| Margin of victory | | 7,945 | 42.62% | ▲12.96 |
| Turnout | | 18,640 | 80.08% | ▲12.56 |
| Registered electors | | 24,417 | | ▼6.72 |
| INC gain from JKNC | | Swing | ▼0.38 | |

=== Assembly Election 1962 ===
1962 Jammu and Kashmir Legislative Assembly election : Akhnoor
| Party | Candidate | Votes | % | ±% |
|---|---|---|---|---|
| JKNC | Shiv Ram | 10,156 | 60.83% | New |
| JPP | Sat Dev | 5,204 | 31.17% | New |
| Harijan Mandal | Punnu Ram | 901 | 5.40% | New |
| Democratic National Conference | Ram Chand | 435 | 2.61% | New |
| Margin of victory | | 4,952 | 29.66% | |
| Turnout | | 16,696 | 65.32% | |
| Registered electors | | 26,176 | | |
| JKNC win (new seat) | | | | |

== See also ==
- Akhnoor
- List of constituencies of Jammu and Kashmir Legislative Assembly
