= Bhalessi =

Bhalessi (with variants Bhaleshi and Bhalesi) may refer to:

- a resident of the Bhalessa region of Jammu and Kashmir, India
- Bhalessi dialect, spoken there

== See also ==
- Balesi language, spoken in Ethiopia and South Sudan
