= Mohan Lal =

Mohan Lal may refer to:

- Mohanlal (born 1960), Indian actor, producer and playback singer
- Mohan Lal (politician), Indian politician from Jammu & Kashmir
- Mohan Lal Kashmiri (1812–1877), traveller, diplomat, and author
- Mohan Lal Sukhadia (1916–1982), Indian politician from Udaipur, 5th Chief Minister of Rajasthan
- Mohanlal (film), a 2018 Indian film by Sajid Yahiya
