= People's Council =

People's Council may refer to:

- People's Council of America for Democracy and the Terms of Peace, an American pacifist organization from 1917 to 1919
- People's Council of the Donetsk People's Republic, legislature of the unrecognised Donetsk People's Republic
- People's Council of Latvia, a temporary parliament in the newly independent Latvia from 1918 to 1920
- People's Council of the Luhansk People's Republic, legislature of the unrecognised Luhansk People's Republic
- People's Council of Syria, or People's Assembly
- People's Council of Turkmenistan
- People's Council (Vietnam), the legislative bodies of the provinces of Vietnam
- People's Council of West Kurdistan, Syria

== See also ==
- Volksraad (disambiguation), Afrikaans and Dutch for People's Council
- Praja Parishad (disambiguation), in India
