= Praja Parishad =

Praja Parishad (lit. 'People's Council') may refer to:

- Nepal Praja Parishad (1939–1940), a former political party in Nepal
- Jammu Praja Parishad (1947–1963), a former political party in the Indian-administered Jammu and Kashmir
- Kisan Mazdoor Praja Parishad or Kisan Mazdoor Praja Party (1951–1952), a short lived farmer-labor party in India
- Chhotanagpur Plateau Praja Parishad (1967–1972), a former tribal political party in India
- Praja Parishad Jammu and Kashmir (2005), a defunct Indian political party in Jammu and Kashmir

== See also ==
- People's Council (disambiguation)
