= Rajeev Sharma =

Rajeev Sharma may refer to:

- Rajeev Sharma (judge)
- Rajeev Sharma (politician)
