= Islamic funeral =

Islamic burial custom

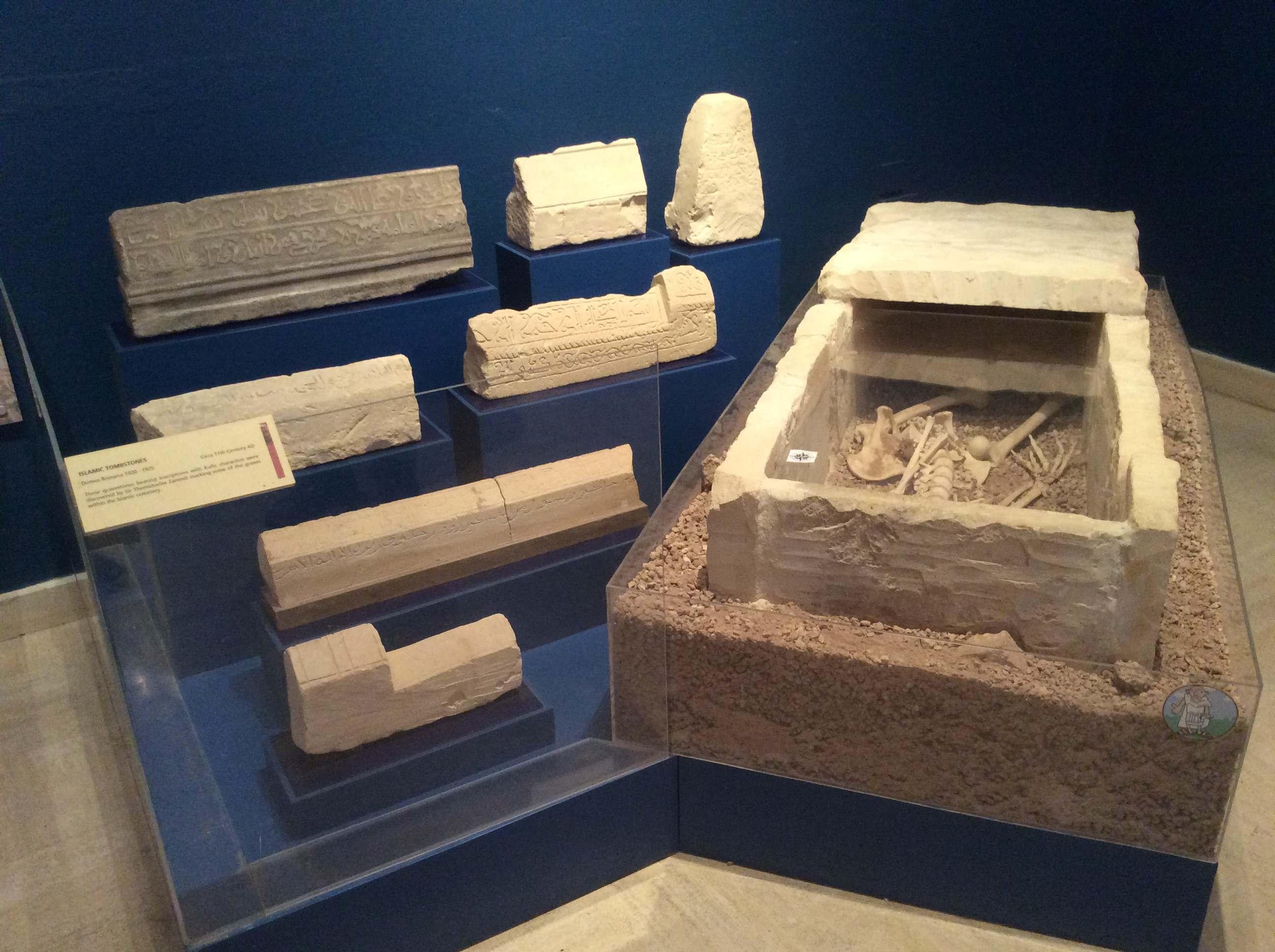
Islamic funerary found at the Domvs Romana in Rabat, Malta – c. 11th century

Islamic funerals (Arabic: جنازة, romanized: Janāzah) follow fairly specific rites, though they are subject to regional interpretation and variation in custom. In all cases, however, sharia (Islamic religious law) calls for burial of the body as soon as possible. The deceased is first bathed and shrouded with simple white cloth. Then a funeral prayer, Salat al-jinazah, is performed. Cremation of the body is strictly forbidden in Islam; the body is buried without a casket and aligned perpendicular to the qibla. The head may be turned to face the qibla as well. Mourning for the deceased is observed for three days except for the widow who mourns for 4 months and 10 days.

== Preparing the body ==
=== Initial prayer ===
Upon news of the deceased, it is common that a prayer is recited from the Quran, Chapter 2, verse 156 - "Indeed, we belong to Allah, and indeed, to Him we return."

=== Bathing ===
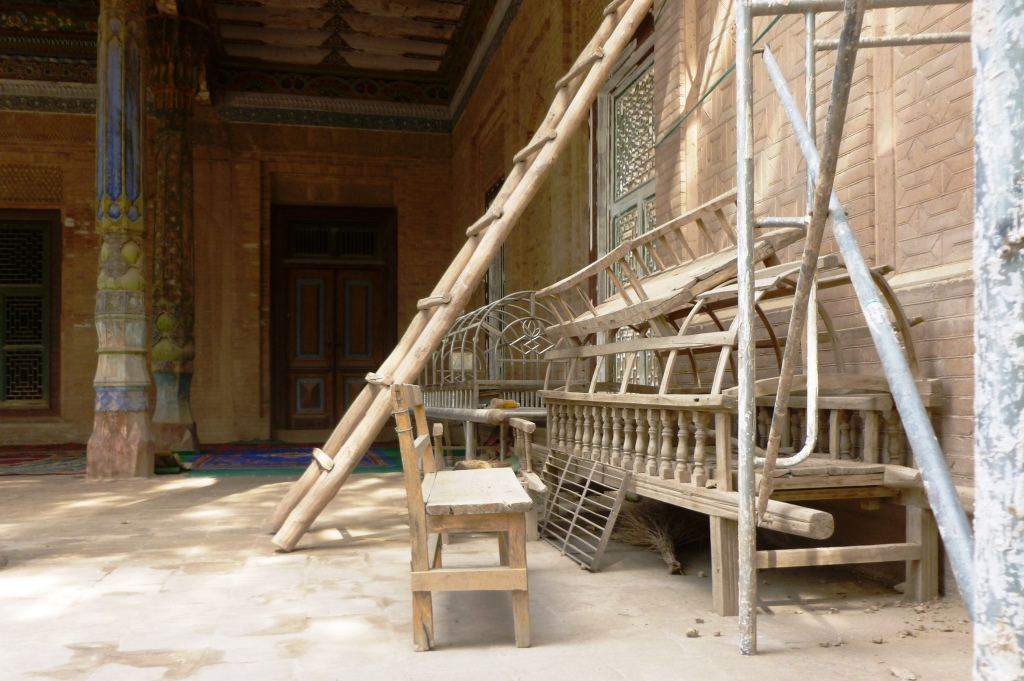
Equipment for washing and preparing bodies at Afaq khoja Mosque, Kashgar. 2010

The corpse is washed (ghusl, bathed) by family members or individuals of the same gender of the deceased. The exact manner, method, style and accessories used for bathing the corpse may vary by locale and temporal position, except that it is to be done with heated water. Bathing the dead body is an essential ritual of the Sunnah of the Islamic prophet Muhammad symbolizing physical and spiritual purification.

Orthodox practice is to wash the body an odd number of times (at least once) with a cloth covering its awrah (parts of the body that should be hidden according to sharia).

=== Shrouding ===
After bathing, the body is wrapped in simple white cloth (known as kafan). This is done to respect the dignity and privacy of the deceased with the family sometimes present. The specifics of this ritual, including the material, style, and colour of the cloth, may vary between regions. It is for this reason that Muslims have generally preferred to use white cotton cloth to serve as the shroud. Men may use only three pieces of cloth and women five pieces of cloth. Overall, this process is part of the Islamic principle of that all individuals are buried in the same manner and God views all as equal.

If a Muslim dies without any family or friends to carry out the bathing and shrouding rituals, elders in the Muslim community arrange for the rites to be completed.

== Funeral prayer ==
After the announcement of death of the deceased persons, the Muslims of the community gather to offer their collective prayers for the forgiveness of the dead. This prayer has been generally termed as the Salat al-Janazah (funeral prayer).

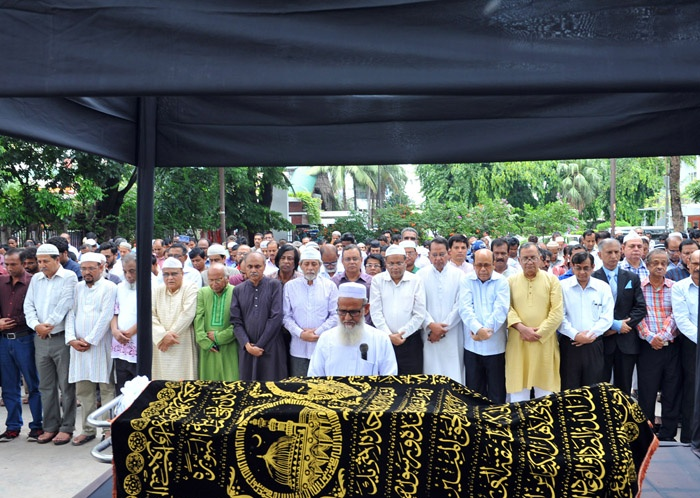
Funeral prayer Funeral prayer Habibur Rahman Milon

The Janazah prayer is as follows:

- The Janazah prayer incorporates four takbirs, the Arabic name for the phrase 'Allahu Akbar', but there is no ruku' (bowing) and sujud (prostrating).
- Supplication for the deceased and mankind is recited.
- In extraordinary circumstances, the prayer can be postponed and prayed at a later time as was done in the Battle of Uhud.
- The Janazah is considered fard kifaayah (communal obligation), meaning that only a few people have to do it, but everyone is considered sinful if no one prays it. It is prayed upon the death of an adult Muslim in the community.

== Funeral services ==
Grave of a Muslim

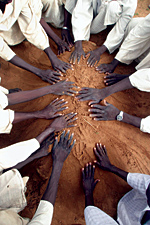
Muslim men finishing a grave after a burial

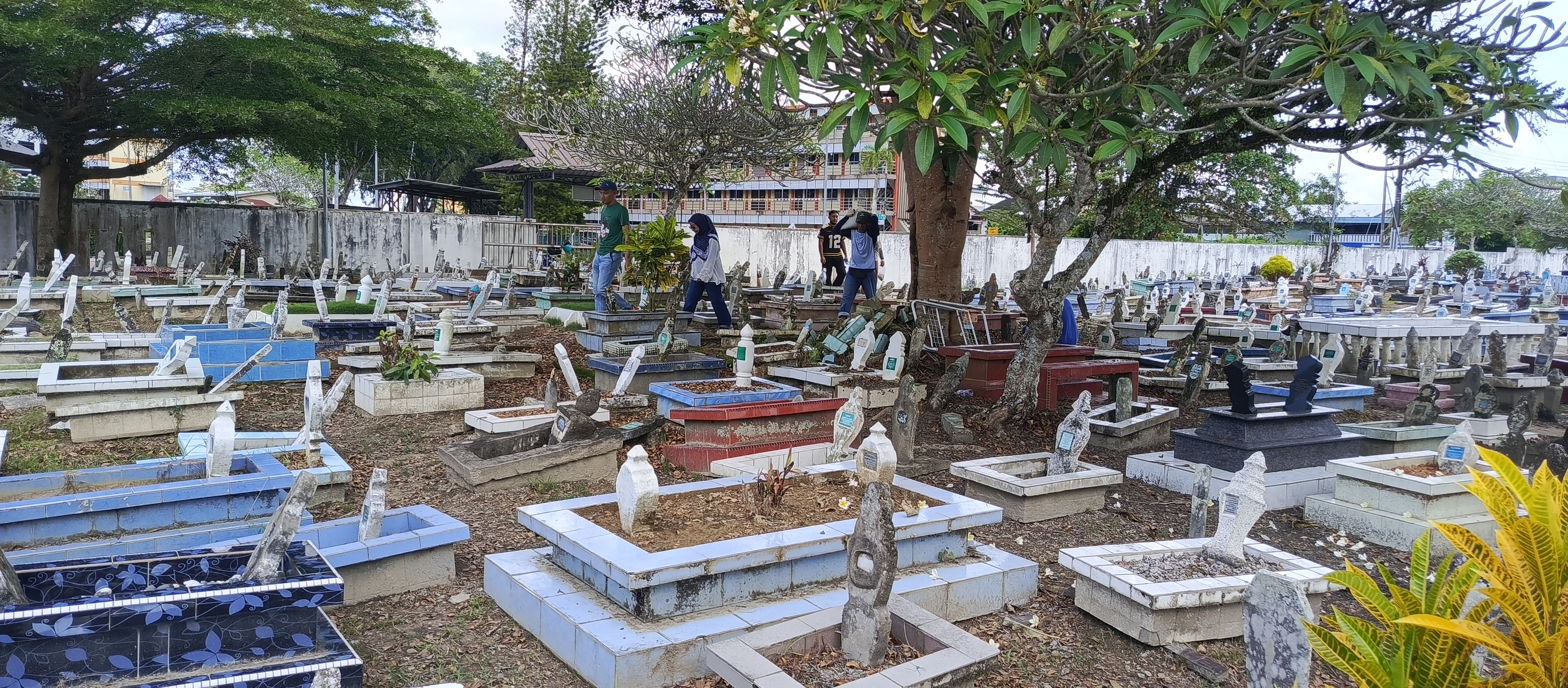
Muslim cemetery, Sibu.

Following washing, shrouding and prayer, the body is then taken for burial (al-Dafin). Burial typically occurs as soon as possible, ideally within 24 hours of death, to honor the deceased and prevent undue delay. However, customs of the burial may vary depending on one's sect of Islam. Muslims typically try their best to follow hadith regarding proper grave burial procedures. Some traditions of Islam permit only men to attend funeral services.

The grave should be perpendicular to the direction of the qibla (i.e. Mecca). Islam does not use coffins in burial, more specifically in Muslim majority countries; instead, stones or wood are placed at the bottom where the body will rest. The body is placed in the grave on its right side facing the qibla. Once the body is placed, each attendee places three handfuls of soil on top to fill the grave accompanied by a prayer. The grave is kept simple and Islamic tradition does not call for a tombstone; a small marker can be placed to identify the grave site.

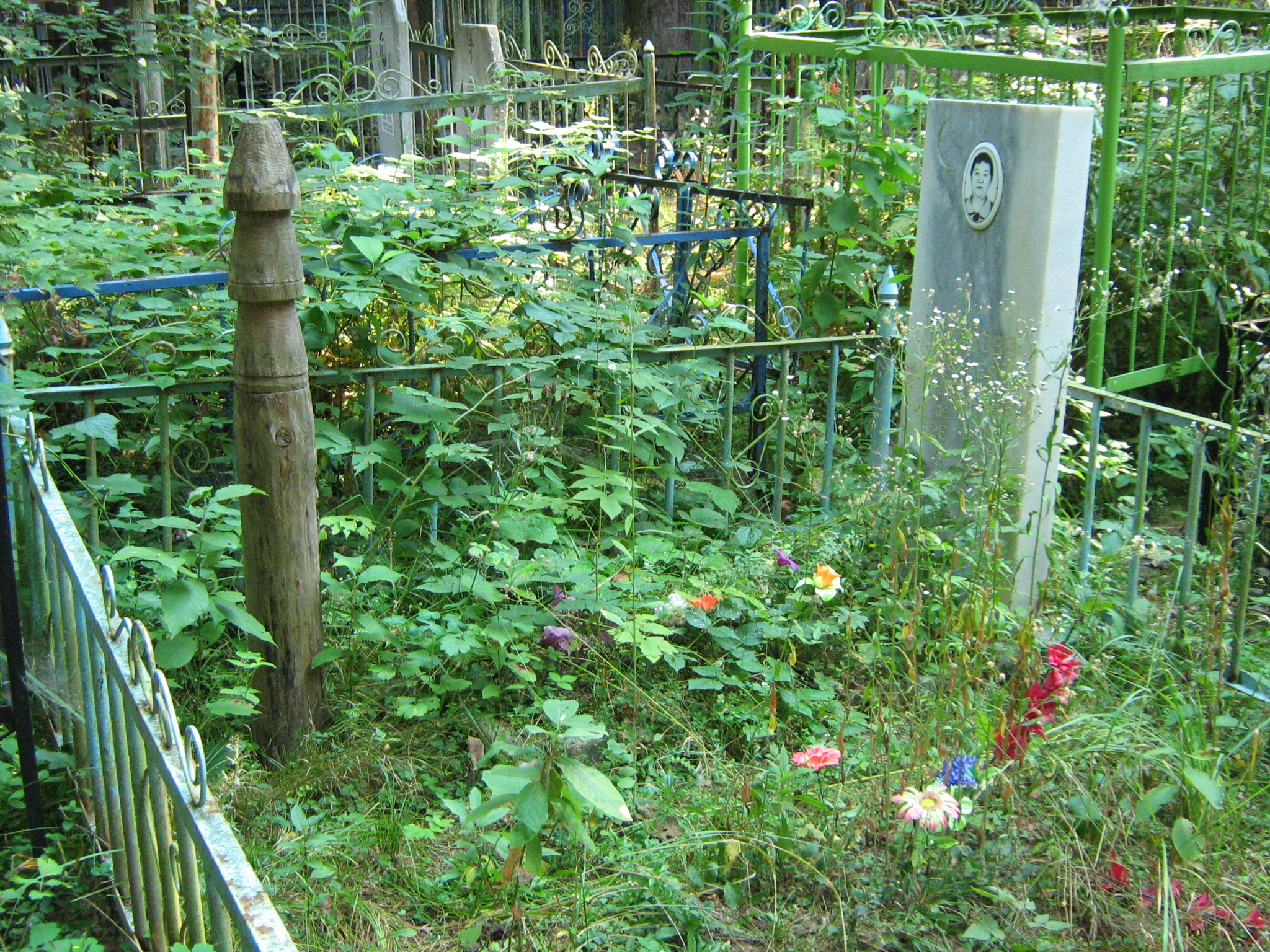
A Tatar Muslim cemetery

== Mourning ==
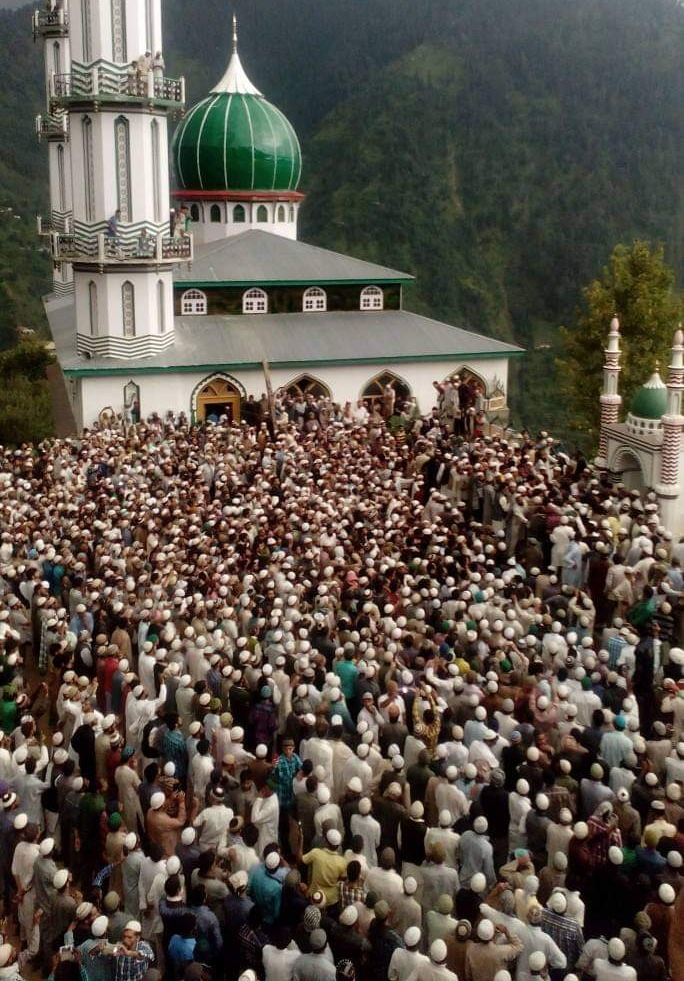
A large crowd gathered in 2015 for funeral of Alhaj Ghulam Qadir Ganipuri at Bhalessa

Grief at the death of a loved one and weeping for the dead is normal and acceptable. According to Sunni Islam, the mourning period is to be three days except for widows who have an extended period. Islamic mourning is observed by increased devotion, receiving visitors and condolences, and avoiding decorative clothing and jewelry in accordance with the Qur'an. Widows must observe iddah, "period of waiting" which is four months and 10 days long.

Sunni Islam expects expressions of grief to remain dignified, prohibiting loud wailing or mourning in a loud voice, shrieking, beating the chest and cheeks, tearing hair or clothes, breaking objects, scratching faces or speaking phrases such as challenging the power of God (e.g. "If God exists and is just, he would not allow such injustice"). Grieving is allowed as part of the funerary rites to allow one to come to terms with the loss of a person passing away as long as it respects Allah.

=== Widows ===
As stated in the Qur'an, widows are to observe a longer mourning period (iddah) of four lunar months and ten days. Islamic scholars consider this directive a balance between the mourning of a husband's death and the protection of a widow from cultural or societal censure if she became interested in remarrying after her husband's death, often an economic necessity. This provision also operates to protect the property rights of the unborn, as the duration is enough to ascertain whether a widow is pregnant or not.

And those of you who die and leave widows behind, they should keep themselves in waiting for four months and ten days. Then when they have fulfilled their term, there is no blame on you about what they do with themselves in accordance with the norms [of society]. And Allah is well acquainted with what you do. And there is also no blame on you if you tacitly send a marriage proposal to these women or hold it in your hearts. Allah knows that you would definitely talk to them. [Do so] but do not make a secret contract. Of course you can say something in accordance with the norms [of the society]. And do not decide to marry until the law reaches its term. And know that Allah has knowledge of what is in your hearts; so be fearful of Him and know that Allah is Most forgiving and Most Forbearing.

— Quran 2:234–235

== Charity and supplication ==
Charity (sadaqah) and supplications (du'a) are integral to the funeral practices. Acts of charity on behalf of the deceased are believed to benefit the deceased's soul.

== See also ==
- Islamic view of death
- Burial at sea in Islam
- The Majmuna Stone, a 12th-century Islamic marble tombstone
- Wadi-us-Salaam, an Islamic cemetery and the largest cemetery in the world
- Pocong, a ghost shrouded in kafan from Javanese folklore
