= Al Azhar Memorial Garden =

Cemetery in East Kawarang, West Java, Indonesia

Coordinates: 6.3560°S 107.3056°E

Al-Azhar Memorial Garden is an Islamic cemetery and a business unit of the Al-Azhar Islamic Foundation (YPI Al-Azhar) that has provided Islamic funeral services since 2011. The cemetery, which is located in Karawang Timur, West Java, Indonesia, covers 25 hectares (62 acres) and can accommodate around 29,000 bodies.

In accordance with Islamic Shari’a, Muslim graves and non-Muslim graves should not be mixed. Therefore, Al-Azhar Memorial Garden Muslim Cemetery only serves Muslim graves. In accordance with Shari’a, a tomb must not be stepped over so the graveyard's layout includes a walkway in front of each tomb.

== Purpose and objectives ==
The Al-Azhar Memorial Garden was built primarily as an Islamic cemetery and includes a mosque. The layout of the cemetery is organized so that they are facing toward Mecca. There is also a garden in the cemetery.

== Islamic Funerals ==
The Al-Azhar Memorial Garden carries out the funeral procession relying on traditional Islamic funeral practices:

== Gallery ==
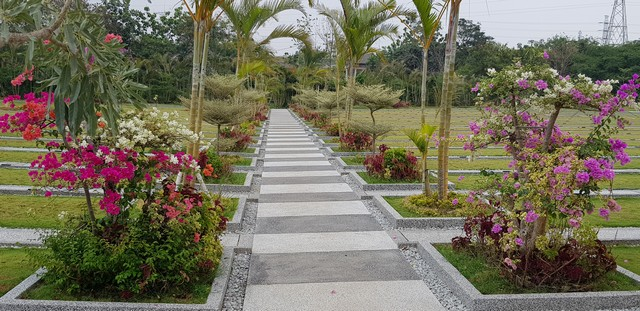
Al-Azhar Memorial Garden Walkway

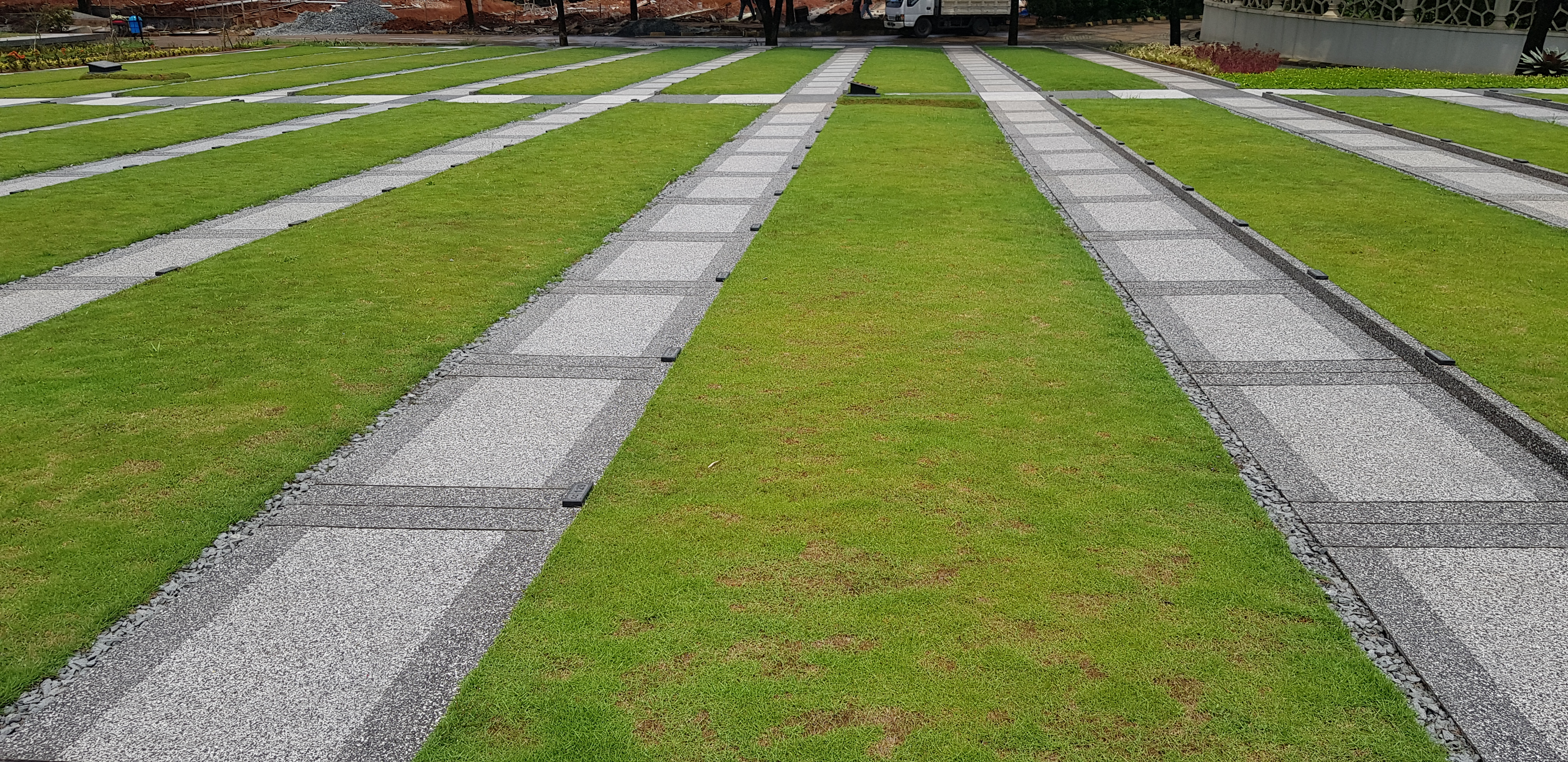
Al-Azhar Memorial Garden
