= House of Assembly (South Africa) =

1910–1994 house in the Parliament of South Africa

House of Assembly of South Africa Volksraad van Suid-Afrika
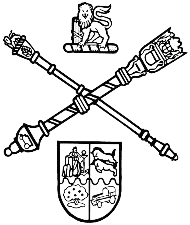
- Coat of arms

Type
- Type: Lower house (1910–1981); Unicameral (1981–1984); White representative house (1984–1994)

History
- Established: 1910
- Disbanded: 1994
- Succeeded by: National Assembly

Elections
- Voting system: First-past-the-post
- First election: 15 September 1910
- Last election: 6 September 1989

Meeting place
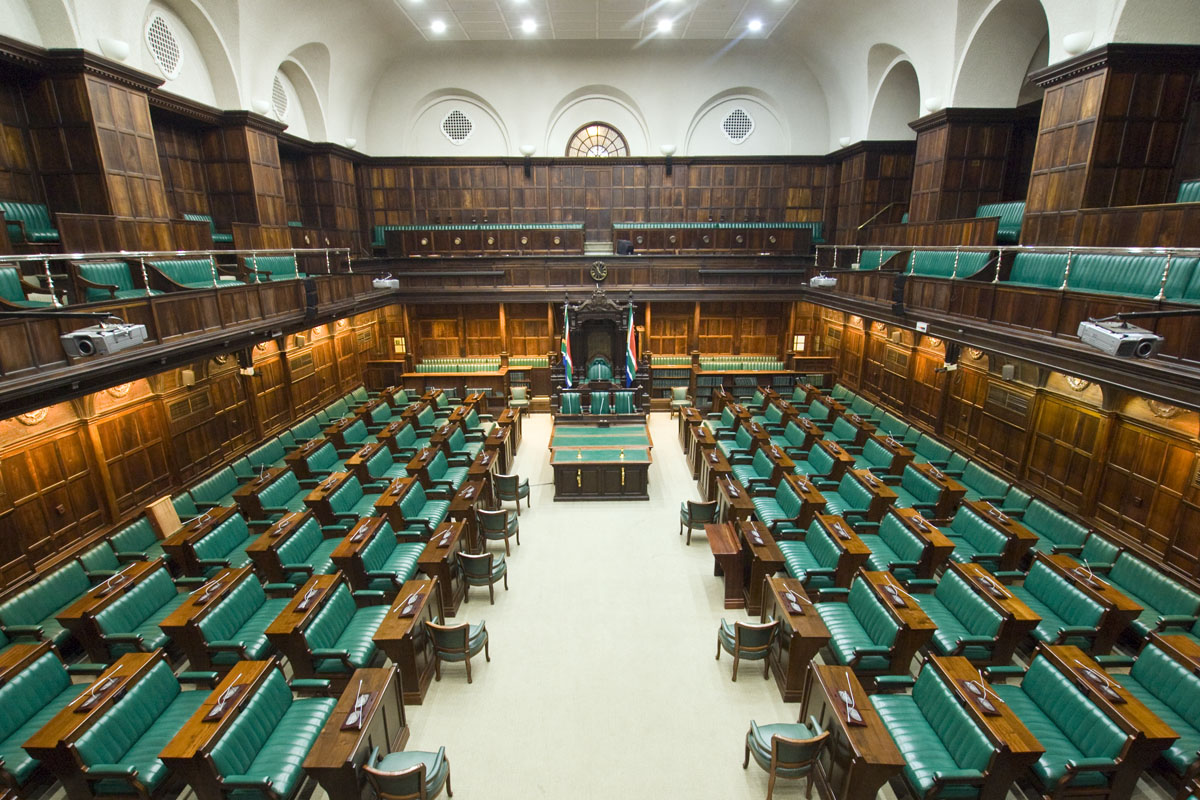
- House of Assembly Chamber; Houses of Parliament; Cape Town; Cape Province, South Africa

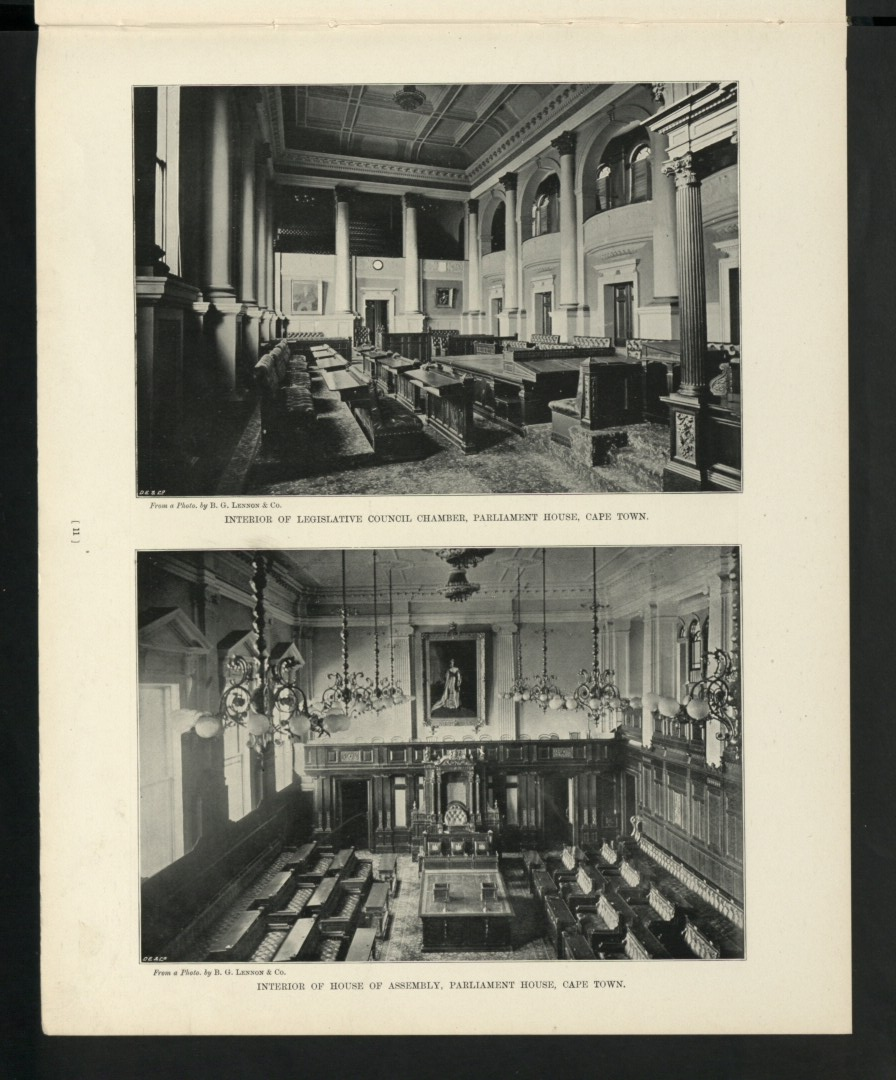
The House of Assembly

The House of Assembly (known in Afrikaans as the Volksraad, or "People's Council") was the lower house of the Parliament of South Africa from 1910 to 1981, the sole parliamentary chamber between 1981 and 1984, and latterly the white representative house of the Tricameral Parliament from 1984 to 1994, when it was replaced by the current National Assembly. Throughout its history, it was composed exclusively of white members who were elected to office predominantly by white citizens, though until 1960 and 1970, respectively, some Black Africans and Coloureds in the Cape Province voted under a restricted form of suffrage.

The old House of Assembly chamber was severely damaged in a fire in January 2022.

== Method of election ==
The members were elected by first-past-the-post voting in single-member electoral divisions. Following the abolition of the Senate in 1981, the membership of the House of Assembly was increased included 12 additional members, of whom four were appointed by the State President and eight were elected by the directly elected members. The elected additional members were chosen by proportional representation, by means of the single transferable vote.

== Franchise ==
The South Africa Act 1909 provided that the franchise in each province should be the same as that in the corresponding colony before the Union, until altered by the Union Parliament. The Act included entrenching clauses, providing that black and coloured voters could only be removed from the common voters roll in the Cape of Good Hope, by legislation passed by a two-thirds majority by both houses of Parliament in joint session.

The franchise, in all parts of the Union, was initially limited to men over the age of 21. White women were enfranchised in 1929 and the remaining property and income qualifications affecting white men were abolished in 1930. Following the passing of the Electoral Law Amendment Act in 1958, the voting age for whites was reduced to 18. There were some additional qualifications and disqualifications which varied between provinces.

The voters in the Orange Free State, Transvaal and South West Africa had to be qualified white people, throughout the whole period when those areas were represented in the House of Assembly.

=== Cape Franchise ===
The Cape of Good Hope had a franchise based on property and wage qualifications, open to people of all races. At the time of the National Convention in 1908, which drafted the terms of what became the South Africa Act, "22,784 Native and Coloured persons out of a total of 152,221 electors" were entitled to vote in Cape elections.

From 1930, the traditional Cape franchise only affected non-white electors. The 1929 and 1930 extensions of white voting rights were not granted to the non-white majority of the population.

Until 1937, a small number of blacks in the Cape Province were included on the common voters' roll. Under the Representation of Natives Act (1936), three white members were elected to represent black voters in the province, with the voters' roll being limited to only 11 000. In 1960, these seats were abolished.

Similarly the coloured voters in Cape Province were removed from the common (or general roll), under the Separate Representation of Voters Act 1951, although as the Act was challenged during the Coloured vote constitutional crisis and not completely enforced until the later 1950s, the last year to see non-whites participate in a general election was in 1953. Coloured electors complying with qualifications were subsequently given four white MPs between 1958 and 1970. These seats were abolished in 1968 through the Separate Representation of Voters Amendment Act, 1968, enacted on behalf of Prime Minister B. J. Vorster. This removed all political representation for non-whites in South Africa; Indians had never had any parliamentary representation.

=== Natal Franchise ===
Natal had a theoretically non-racial franchise, which was similar to (but different in detail) from the property and income based franchise of the Cape. In practice, few non-white electors ever qualified to vote under it. It was estimated, in 1908, that "200 non-Europeans out of a total of 22,786 electors had secured franchise rights".

In 1935, there was one black elector in Natal. He retained the general roll franchise when the Cape black voters lost it.

== South West Africa ==
In 1949, the South West Africa Affairs Amendment Act extended parliamentary representation to South West Africa's white minority, who elected six MPs to the House of Assembly. They were first elected in 1950, with the territory being represented in the South African Parliament until 1977. South West Africa's representation in the South African Parliament was abolished in 1977 to pave the way for independence for the territory. However, this would not occur until 1990.

By contrast, Walvis Bay was transferred back to the Cape Province, thereby making it an exclave. From 1980, it formed part of the Green Point constituency in Cape Town, before becoming a separate constituency in 1982.

== Tricameral Parliament ==
In the Tricameral Parliament, the House of Assembly (by this time numbering 178 members) was retained as the Whites-only chamber while the House of Representatives and House of Delegates were designated to Coloureds and Asians respectively.

== Composition by election, province, and type ==
Election	No.	Cape	Nat	OFS	SWA	Tvl	Total gen.	CCRM	CNRM	Total MPs
1910, 15 September	1	51	17	17	–	36	121	–	–	121
1915, 20 October	2	51	17	17	–	45	130	–	–	130
1920, 20 March	3	51	17	17	–	49	134	–	–	134
1921, 8 February	4	51	17	17	–	49	134	–	–	134
1924, 19 June	5	51	17	17	–	50	135	–	–	135
1929, 14 June	6	58	17	18	–	55	148	–	–	148
1933, 17 May	7	61	16	16	–	57	150	–	–	150
1938, 18 May	8	59	16	15	–	60	150	–	3	153
1943, 17 July	9	56	16	14	–	64	150	–	3	153
1948, 26 May	10	55	16	13	–	66	150	–	3	153
1953, 15 April	11	54	15	13	6	68	156	–	3	159
1958, 16 April	12	52	16	14	6	68	156	4	3	163
1961, 8 October	13	52	16	14	6	68	156	4	–	160
1966, 30 March	14	54	18	15	6	73	166	4	–	170
1970, 22 April	15	54	18	15	6	73	166	–	–	166
1974, 24 April	16	55	20	14	6	76	171	–	–	171
1977, 30 November	17	55	20	14	–	76	165	IE	Nom	165
1981, 29 April	18	55	20	14	–	76	165	8	4	177
1987, 6 May	19	56	20	14	–	76	166	8	4	178
1989, 6 September	20	56	20	14	–	76	166	8	4	178

Abbreviations and notes:

- General roll electoral divisions (contested at general elections)
- Cape: Cape of Good Hope
- Nat: Natal
- OFS: Orange Free State
- SWA: South West Africa (represented in the House 1950–1977)
- Tvl: Transvaal
- Non-general roll seats (not filled at general elections)
- CCRM: Cape Coloured representative members (represented in the House 1958–1970)
- CNRM: Cape Native representative members (represented in the House 1937–1960)
- IE: Indirectly elected, by the directly elected MPs (represented in the House January 1981 – 1994)
- Nom: Nominated by the State President, one per province (represented in the House January 1981 – 1994)

== Election results ==
The following table reflects only those members elected from general roll electoral divisions.

Term	Election	Total seats	Parties						
			South African			Unionist	Labour	Others	Independent
1st	15 September 1910	121	67			39	4	—	11
			National		South African	Unionist	Labour	Others	Independent
2nd	20 October 1915	130	27		54	39	4	—	6
3rd	20 March 1920	134	44		41	25	21	—	3
			National		South African		Labour	Others	Independent
4th	8 February 1921	134	45		79		9	—	1
5th	19 June 1924	135	63		53		18	—	1
6th	14 June 1929	148	78		61		8	—	1
7th	17 May 1933	150	75		61		2	2 Roos	10
			Purified National	United		Dominion	Labour	Others	Independent
8th	18 May 1938	150	27	111		8	3	1 Socialist	—
			Reunited National		United	Dominion	Labour	Others	Independent
9th	17 July 1943	150	43		89	7	9	—	2
			Afrikaner	Reunited National	United		Labour	Others	Independent
10th	26 May 1948	150	9	70	65		6	—	—
			National		United		Labour	Others	Independent
11th	15 April 1953	156	94		57		5	—	—
12th	16 April 1958	156	103		53		—	—	—
			National		United	Progressive	Others		Independent
13th	8 October 1961	156	105		59	1	1 National Union		—
14th	30 March 1966	166	126		39	1	—		—
15th	22 April 1970	166	118		47	1	—		—
16th	24 April 1974	171	123		41	7	—		—
			National		New Republic	Progressive Federal	Others		Independent
17th	30 November 1977	165	134		10	17	3 South African		1
18th/19th	29 April 1981	165	131		8	26	—		—
			Conservative	National	New Republic	Progressive Federal	Others		Independent
20th	6 May 1987	166	22	123	1	19	—		1
			Conservative	National	Democratic		Others		Independent
21st	6 September 1989	166	39	94	33		—		—

== See also ==
- Senate of South Africa
- Volksraad
