= Bhaderwah Assembly constituency =

Constituency of the Jammu and Kashmir Legislative Assembly

Coordinates: 32.981°N 75.711°E

Bhaderwah
- Constituency No. 51 for the Jammu and Kashmir Legislative Assembly

Constituency details
- Country: India
- State: Jammu and Kashmir
- District: Doda
- Lok Sabha constituency: Udhampur
- Established: 1962

Member of Legislative Assembly
- Incumbent Daleep Singh Parihar
- Party: BJP
- Alliance: NDA
- Elected year: 2024

Bhaderwah Assembly constituency is one of the 90 constituencies in the Jammu and Kashmir Legislative Assembly of Jammu and Kashmir, the northernmost state of India. Bhaderwah is also part of the Udhampur Lok Sabha constituency.

== Members of the Legislative Assembly ==
Election	Member	Party
1962	Chuni Lal	Jammu & Kashmir National Conference
1967	J. Ram	Indian National Congress
1972	Bodh Raj	Indian National Congress
1977	Narain Dass	Janata Party
1983	Hari Lal Hitaishit	Indian National Congress
1987	Hari Lal Hitaishit	Indian National Congress
1996	Sheikh Abdul Rehman	Bahujan Samaj Party
2002	Mohammad Sharief Niaz	Indian National Congress
2006 By-election	Ghulam Nabi Azad	Indian National Congress
2008	Ghulam Nabi Azad	Indian National Congress
2009 By-election	Mohammed Sharief Niaz	Indian National Congress
2014	Daleep Singh Parihar	Bharatiya Janata Party
2024	Daleep Singh Parihar	Bharatiya Janata Party

== Election results ==
=== Assembly Election 2024 ===
2024 Jammu and Kashmir Legislative Assembly election : Bhaderwah
Party	Candidate	Votes	%	±%
BJP	Daleep Singh Parihar	42,128	48.98%	▲13.65
JKNC	Sheikh Mehboob Iqbal	31,998	37.20%	New
INC	Nadeem Sharief	7,151	8.31%	▼24.98
BSP	Meenkashi Bhagat	1,066	1.24%	New
Independent	Manoj Kumar	777	0.90%	New
JKAP	Vikram Rathore	580	0.67%	New
NOTA	None of the Above	865	1.01%	▲0.54
Margin of victory		10,130	11.78%	▲9.74
Turnout		86,016	69.05%	▼0.06
Registered electors		1,24,568		▲17.18
BJP hold		Swing	▲13.65	

=== Assembly Election 2014 ===
2014 Jammu and Kashmir Legislative Assembly election : Bhaderwah
Party	Candidate	Votes	%	±%
BJP	Daleep Singh Parihar	25,953	35.33%	▼0.80
INC	Mohammed Sharief Niaz	24,457	33.29%	▼8.00
JKPDP	Sheikh Mehboob Iqbal	16,673	22.70%	New
Independent	Reyaz Ahmed Zarger	1,310	1.78%	New
CPI	Narinder Kant	891	1.21%	New
JKNC	Riaz Anayat Ullah	880	1.20%	New
SP	Shiekh Mohammad Shafi	828	1.13%	New
NOTA	None of the Above	339	0.46%	New
Margin of victory		1,496	2.04%	▼3.13
Turnout		73,463	69.11%	▲12.64
Registered electors		1,06,302		▲12.84
BJP gain from INC		Swing	▼5.96	

=== Assembly By-election 2009 ===
2009 Jammu and Kashmir Legislative Assembly by-election : Bhaderwah
Party	Candidate	Votes	%	±%
INC	Mohammed Sharief Niaz	21,966	41.29%	▼21.57
BJP	Daleep Singh Parihar	19,219	36.13%	▲21.66
J&K NPP	Sheikh Mujib Ali	7,146	13.43%	New
Independent	Mohammed Shafi Sheikh	2,396	4.50%	New
BSP	Sanjay Kumar	1,226	2.30%	▲1.37
J&KNPP	Mohammed Iqbal	603	1.13%	New
Independent	Kuldeep K Rao	405	0.76%	New
Margin of victory		2,747	5.16%	▼43.22
Turnout		53,200	56.49%	▼8.81
Registered electors		94,208		▲1.10
INC hold		Swing	▼21.57	

=== Assembly Election 2008 ===
2008 Jammu and Kashmir Legislative Assembly election : Bhaderwah
Party	Candidate	Votes	%	±%
INC	Ghulam Nabi Azad	38,238	62.86%	▼31.01
BJP	Daya Kirshan Kotwal	8,802	14.47%	New
JKNC	Mohammad Aslam Goni	6,687	10.99%	New
JKPDP	Sheikh Mujib Ali	2,807	4.61%	New
CPI	Sohan Lal	921	1.51%	New
SP	Mohammed Shafi Sheikh	898	1.48%	New
BSP	Abdul Hafiz Wani	570	0.94%	New
Margin of victory		29,436	48.39%	▼39.34
Turnout		60,835	65.29%	▼7.26
Registered electors		93,183		▲2.22
INC hold		Swing	▼31.01	

=== Assembly By-election 2006 ===
2006 Jammu and Kashmir Legislative Assembly by-election : Bhaderwah
Party	Candidate	Votes	%	±%
INC	Ghulam Nabi Azad	62,072	93.87%	▲59.69
Independent	Dhantar Singh	4,057	6.13%	New
Margin of victory		58,015	87.73%	▲73.97
Turnout		66,129	72.54%	▲18.29
Registered electors		91,159		▼0.35
INC hold		Swing		

=== Assembly Election 2002 ===
2002 Jammu and Kashmir Legislative Assembly election : Bhaderwah
Party	Candidate	Votes	%	±%
INC	Mohammed Sharief Niaz	16,962	34.18%	▲29.29
JKNC	Mohammed Aslam	10,135	20.42%	New
BJP	Daya Kirshan Kotwal	9,711	19.57%	▼21.34
BSP	Sheikh Abdul Rehman	3,724	7.50%	▼43.73
Independent	Daleep Singh Parihar	3,415	6.88%	New
Independent	Vinod Kumar Bhagat	2,376	4.79%	New
JKPDP	Sheikh Mujib Ali Murtaza	1,498	3.02%	New
Margin of victory		6,827	13.76%	▲3.43
Turnout		49,628	54.25%	▼11.21
Registered electors		91,478		▲41.94
INC gain from BSP		Swing	▼17.05	

=== Assembly Election 1996 ===
1996 Jammu and Kashmir Legislative Assembly election : Bhaderwah
Party	Candidate	Votes	%	±%
BSP	Sheikh Abdul Rehman	21,615	51.23%	New
BJP	Daya Kirshan Kotwal	17,260	40.91%	▲39.34
INC	Swami Raj Sharma	2,064	4.89%	▼49.28
JD	Mohammed Iqbal	445	1.05%	New
CPI	Des Raj	341	0.81%	▼2.77
Margin of victory		4,355	10.32%	▼5.50
Turnout		42,191	66.73%	▲14.93
Registered electors		64,450		▲49.85
BSP gain from INC		Swing	▼2.94	

=== Assembly Election 1987 ===
1987 Jammu and Kashmir Legislative Assembly election : Bhaderwah
Party	Candidate	Votes	%	±%
INC	Hari Lal Hitaishit	11,772	54.17%	▲5.30
LKD	Gian Chand	8,333	38.34%	▲35.20
CPI	Isher Lal	778	3.58%	New
BJP	Om Parkash	342	1.57%	New
Independent	Narain Dass	172	0.79%	New
Independent	Bal Krishan	167	0.77%	New
Margin of victory		3,439	15.82%	▲13.75
Turnout		21,732	51.40%	▼13.31
Registered electors		43,009		▲14.63
INC hold		Swing	▲5.30	

=== Assembly Election 1983 ===
1983 Jammu and Kashmir Legislative Assembly election : Bhaderwah
Party	Candidate	Votes	%	±%
INC	Hari Lal Hitaishit	11,706	48.87%	▲36.60
JKNC	Bodh Raj	11,209	46.80%	▲12.97
LKD	Manohar Lal	752	3.14%	New
Independent	Narain Dass	286	1.19%	New
Margin of victory		497	2.07%	▼5.06
Turnout		23,953	65.54%	▲28.37
Registered electors		37,521		▲20.21
INC gain from JP		Swing	▲7.91	

=== Assembly Election 1977 ===
1977 Jammu and Kashmir Legislative Assembly election : Bhaderwah
Party	Candidate	Votes	%	±%
JP	Narain Dass	4,535	40.96%	New
JKNC	Thakur Dass	3,745	33.82%	New
INC	Hari Lal Hitaishit	1,359	12.27%	▼53.00
Independent	Bodh Raj	639	5.77%	New
Independent	Bansi Lal	466	4.21%	New
Independent	Bal Krislhan	286	2.58%	New
Margin of victory		790	7.14%	▼27.34
Turnout		11,072	36.34%	▲1.71
Registered electors		31,213		▲12.53
JP gain from INC		Swing	▼24.32	

=== Assembly Election 1972 ===
1972 Jammu and Kashmir Legislative Assembly election : Bhaderwah
Party	Candidate	Votes	%	±%
INC	Bodh Raj	6,114	65.28%	▲6.72
ABJS	Narain Dass	2,885	30.80%	New
INC(O)	Lal Chand	190	2.03%	New
Independent	Jagat Ram	177	1.89%	New
Margin of victory		3,229	34.48%	▲17.36
Turnout		9,366	34.82%	▼3.89
Registered electors		27,738		▲9.96
INC hold		Swing	▲6.72	

=== Assembly Election 1967 ===
1967 Jammu and Kashmir Legislative Assembly election : Bhaderwah
Party	Candidate	Votes	%	±%
INC	J. Ram	5,562	58.56%	New
Independent	Faqiroo	3,936	41.44%	New
Margin of victory		1,626	17.12%	▼26.55
Turnout		9,498	39.18%	▼20.67
Registered electors		25,225		▼5.21
INC gain from JKNC		Swing	▼13.27	

=== Assembly Election 1962 ===
1962 Jammu and Kashmir Legislative Assembly election : Bhaderwah
Party	Candidate	Votes	%	±%
JKNC	Chuni Lal	11,150	71.83%	New
JPP	Abdul Rehman	4,372	28.17%	New
Margin of victory		6,778	43.67%	
Turnout		15,522	58.56%	
Registered electors		26,612		
JKNC win (new seat)				

== See also ==
- Bhaderwah
- List of constituencies of Jammu and Kashmir Legislative Assembly
