= Jammu North Assembly constituency =

Constituency of the Jammu and Kashmir legislative assembly in India

Jammu North
- Constituency No. 79 for the Jammu and Kashmir Legislative Assembly

Constituency details
- Country: India
- State: Jammu and Kashmir
- District: Jammu
- Lok Sabha constituency: Jammu
- Established: 2022

Member of Legislative Assembly
- Incumbent Sham Lal Sharma
- Party: BJP
- Alliance: NDA
- Elected year: 2024

Jammu North Assembly constituency is one of the 90 constituencies in the Jammu and Kashmir Legislative Assembly of Jammu and Kashmir a north state of India. Jammu North is also part of Jammu Lok Sabha constituency.

== Members of the Legislative Assembly ==
Election	Member	Party
1962	Prem Nath	Jammu Praja Parishad
1967	Prem Nath	Bharatiya Jana Sangh
1972	Sheikh Abdul Rehman	Bharatiya Jana Sangh
2024	Sham Lal Sharma	Bharatiya Janata Party

== Election results ==
=== Assembly Election 2024 ===
2024 Jammu and Kashmir Legislative Assembly election : Jammu North
Party	Candidate	Votes	%	±%
BJP	Sham Lal Sharma	47,219	63.66%	New
JKNC	Ajay Sadhotra	19,856	26.77%	New
Independent	Shiv Dev Singh	2,442	3.29%	New
Independent	Akash Singh Slathia	1,161	1.57%	New
BSP	Badri Nath	598	0.81%	New
Independent	Amit Kapoor	560	0.75%	New
NOTA	None of the Above	319	0.43%	New
Margin of victory		27,363	36.89%	▲13.41
Turnout		74,178	66.69%	▲2.34
Registered electors		1,11,228		▲246.55
BJP gain from ABJS		Swing	▲3.43	

=== Assembly Election 1972 ===
1972 Jammu and Kashmir Legislative Assembly election : Jammu North
Party	Candidate	Votes	%	±%
ABJS	Sheikh Abdul Rehman	12,439	60.23%	▲0.52
INC	Nilam Ber Dev Sharma	7,590	36.75%	▲2.20
Independent	Shiv Kumar	238	1.15%	New
Independent	Kamal Sharma	140	0.68%	New
Margin of victory		4,849	23.48%	▼1.68
Turnout		20,654	65.59%	▼1.54
Registered electors		32,096		▲23.04
ABJS hold		Swing	▲0.52	

=== Assembly Election 1967 ===
1967 Jammu and Kashmir Legislative Assembly election : Jammu North
Party	Candidate	Votes	%	±%
ABJS	Prem Nath	10,262	59.70%	New
INC	B. Ram	5,938	34.55%	New
Independent	J. Nath	434	2.53%	New
Independent	R. Saroop	327	1.90%	New
Independent	R. Lal	227	1.32%	New
Margin of victory		4,324	25.16%	▼9.97
Turnout		17,188	67.54%	▼3.66
Registered electors		26,085		▼17.91
ABJS gain from JPP		Swing	▼6.94	

=== Assembly Election 1962 ===
1962 Jammu and Kashmir Legislative Assembly election : Jammu North
Party	Candidate	Votes	%	±%
JPP	Prem Nath	14,728	66.64%	New
JKNC	Hardatt Bakshi	6,966	31.52%	New
Independent	Jagdish Chander	406	1.84%	New
Margin of victory		7,762	35.12%	
Turnout		22,100	70.19%	
Registered electors		31,776		
JPP win (new seat)				

== See also ==
- List of constituencies of the Jammu and Kashmir Legislative Assembly
