= Bhalessa =

- Region
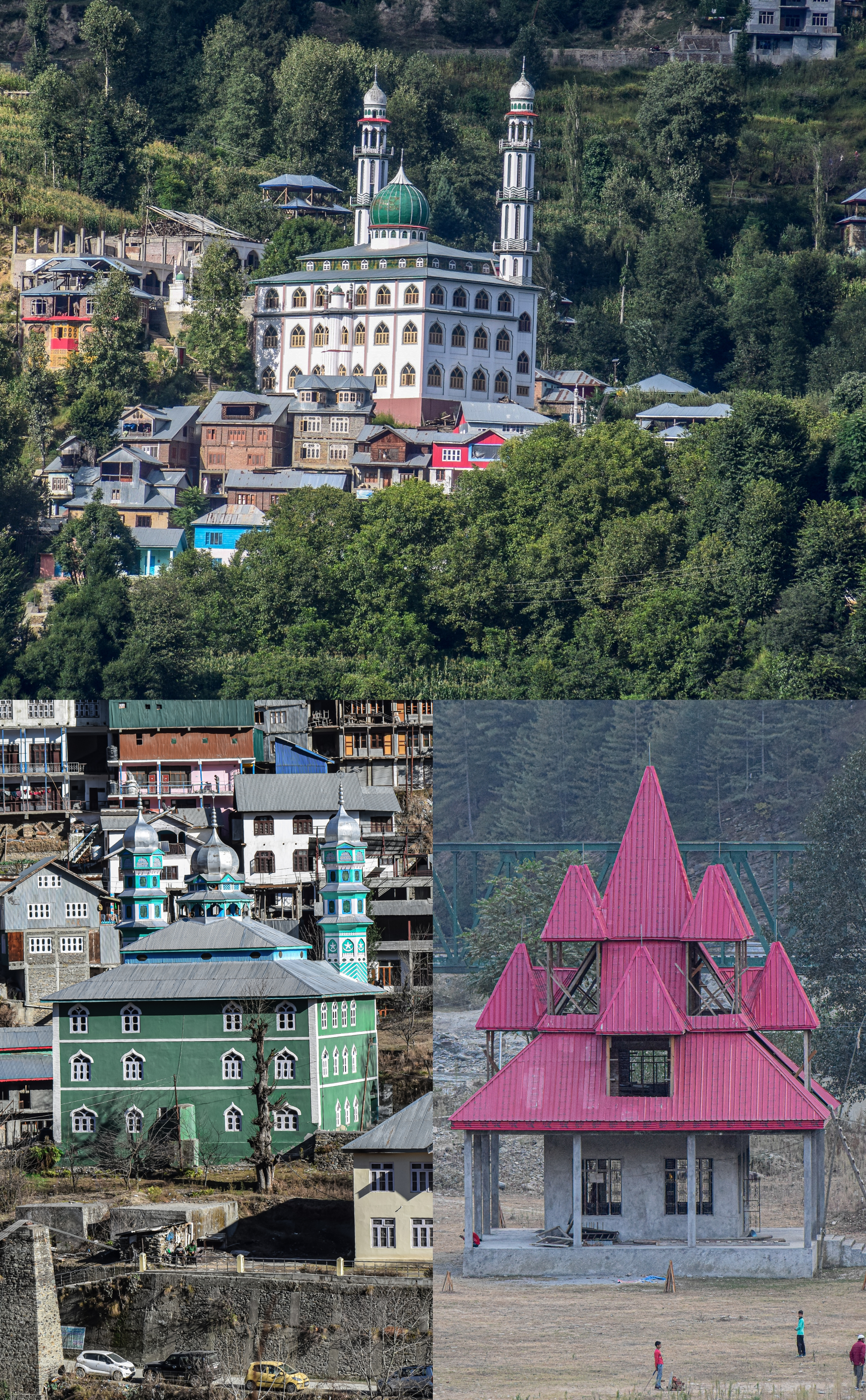
- Clockwise: Jama Masjid Akhyarpur, Shiv Mandir Gandoh and Jama Masjid Gandoh

- Location in Jammu and Kashmir Bhalessa (India)
- Coordinates: 33.03°N 75.90°E
- Country: India
- Union territory: Jammu and Kashmir
- Division: Jammu
- Region: Chenab Valley
- District: Doda

Population (2011)
  - Total: 71,889

Language
  - Local: Bhalessi, Bhaderwahi, Kashmiri, Gojri,
- Time zone: UTC+5:30 (IST)
- PIN: 182207
- Website: www.bhalessa.com

Bhalessa is a geographical area within Doda district in the Jammu division of the union territory of Jammu and Kashmir. It consists of the Bunjwah and Bhalessa Valleys, and comprises the three Tehsils of Kahara, Chilly Pingal and Gandoh.

== Name ==
The name is written بھلیسہ in Urdu, भलेसा in Hindi, and 𑚡𑚥𑚲𑚨𑚭 in the Takri script.

The area is known as Bhales (/bʱəˈles/) to outsiders, but inhabitants of the region use a variety of names, including Bhalessa (/bʱəˈlesɑ/), Bhalesh (/bʱəˈleʃ/, with variant /bʱəˈleiʃ/), and Bhal (/ˈbʱɑl/).

The etymology of the name remains unknown. It has been suggested that it derives from the Sanskrit word for 'good' (bhalla-) or from the name of the 16th-century queen, Queen Bhalla of Bhadarwah.

== Geography ==
The Bhalessa region consists of two valleys: Bonjwah and Bhalessa. Bonjwah contains multiple streams, while Bhalessa contains the Kalgoni stream. The two valleys unite near Donadi and the streams merge into the Chenab river.

The area is easily accessible from Churaha Wazarat of Chamba through passes such as Padri Gali and Mehlwar. To the north, it is flanked by the mountains of Kishtwar.

Bhalessa contains various geographical hamlets, such as Neeli, Jitota, Pingal, Chilli, Nanota, and Basnota. Some other areas include Bal Padri, Kanthi Dhar, Soin Bhagar, Naglotan, Goha Dhar, Jawali meadows, Ghasheer Top, Makan and Chashool, Ghati Dhar, Mehal Dhar, Damote Dhar, Lakhan, Kehan Dhar, Mashood Dhar, Mihaad Dhar, Bach Dhar, Nagni Dhar, Talaie, Dhosa Meadows, Rohari Meadows, Lamhote Meadows, Kota Top, Pangas Top Gwalo, Dhanaso Dhar, and Dulchi Dhar.

== Culture ==
The main spoken language of the sub-district is Bhalessi. Other spoken languages include Kashmiri and Gujari.

During the winter, the nomadic people of the Gujjar and Bakarwals come down to the plain and barren areas of Punjab. During the summer, they go deep into the mountainous valley of Bhalessa with their cattle where they produce milk, cheese, and ghee. During marriage celebrations, the Gujjars perform their folk dances.

Traditional industries such as beekeeping, sheep cattle rearing, handloom weaving, blanket making, and ghee production contribute to the cultural economy of Bhalessa.

== Transport ==
The route to Bhalessa from its nearest airport in Jammu goes through Batote via National Highway 144, the Chenani-Nashri Tunnel, and National Highway 244 (known as Batote – Kishtwar National Highway), which later leads to Thathri, which is just 30 kilometres (19 mi) away from Kishtwar. To reach Bhalessa, it is necessary to leave the National Highway by a link road known as Thathri-Gandoh-Khilotran road.

Concerns are often raised about the state of the roads in the region, particularly the Thathri–Kilhotran Road, which as of July 2020 was still incomplete even after decades of construction.

== Tourism ==
Bhalessa has been a source of attraction for trackers and tourists.

The area consists of green uplands, like Bhal Padri, which can be a source of attraction for tourism. As of 2020, the inhabitants of the Bhalessa region are demanding a Hill District status and a Tourism Development Authority in order to exhibit tourism potential and for administrative convenience. As of July 2020, two potential spots have been identified for the creation of tourism assets in Block Changa. The people of Bhalessa are represented at various levels, in sports, education, politics, civil services, and other diverse fields. Bhalessa is known for interfaith harmony, and religious communities continue to live in peace during turmoil. -there is a tallest mountain, (2415sq. ft) that is "Gasher top" it shows a beautiful view of two states (J&K and Himachal Pradesh)

== Politics and administration ==
Bhalessa has a Sub-Divisional Headquarter located at Gandoh that is controlled by a Sub-Divisional Magistrate.

Bhalessa consists of three tehsils: Gandoh, Chilly Pingal and Kahara. There have been demands for a Hill District Status for these tehsils, as well as for the creation of a separate Tourism Development Authority and the post of Additional Deputy Commissioner (ADC).

According to political listings, Bhalessa is listed in the Bhaderwah constituency and Inderwal constituency. Notable politicians include:

- Ghulam Nabi Azad, a congress leader from the Soti village of Bhalessa. He was the winning candidate in 2006 from the Bhaderwah constituency. He was also the Minister of Health and Family Welfare. As of 2020, he serves as the leader of the opposition in the Rajya Sabha.

He also served as the Chief Minister of erstwhile state of Jammu and Kashmir from 2005 to 2008. On 26 September 2022, Azad announced his own political party as Democratic Progressive Azad Party.

- Mohd Sharief Niaz, a congress leader from Changa village in Bhalessa. He contested the 2009 assembly elections from the Bhaderwah constituency.
- Daleep Singh Parihar, a BJP leader from Batara village in Bhalessa. He is the former MLA candidate from the Bhaderwah constituency.

== Education ==
There is a college in Kilhotran under the name of Government Degree College Kilhotran. Schools in Bhalessa work to impart education in rural villages.

Bhalessa also has a Government Industrial Training Institute (ITI) to give technical training to young people.

There is an unprecedented growth of madrasa education in the area. The madrasas in Bhalessa include Jamia Gani tul uloom and Asrar ul Uloom. Jamia Gani tul uloom is the largest seminary madrasa in the Jammu province. The Jamia was founded by Alhaj Ghulam Qadir Ganipuri.

== Notable people ==
- Ghulam Nabi Azad, politician
- Mithun Manhas, cricketer
- Chain Singh, Olympian, shooter, Asian games medalist.
