= Rajeev Sharma (politician) =

Indian politician

Member of Jammu and Kashmir Legislative Assembly
- In office 2014–2018
- Preceded by: Sham Lal Sharma
- Succeeded by: Mohan Lal
- Constituency: Akhnoor

Personal details
- Political party: Bharatiya Janata Party

Rajeev Sharma (born 1972) is an Indian politician from Jammu and Kashmir. He was a former MLA from Akhnoor Assembly constituency in Jammu district. He won the 2014 Jammu and Kashmir Legislative Assembly election representing the Bharatiya Janata Party.

== Early life and education ==
Sharma is from Akhnoor, Jammu district, Jammu and Kashmir. He is the son of Som Dutt Sharma. He passed Class 8 in 1986 at J.K. Bose school and later discontinued his studies. He runs his own business.

== Career ==
Sharma won from Akhnoor Assembly constituency representing Bharatiya Janata Party in the 2014 Jammu and Kashmir Legislative Assembly election. He polled 41,901 votes and defeated his nearest rival, Sham Lal Sharma of Indian National Congress, by a margin of 9,380 votes.

For the 2024 Assembly election, the BJP nominated him to contest from Chhamb Assembly seat and allotted the Akhnoor seat to retired police officer, Mohan Lal Bhagat, who joined the party in August 2024, and Bhagat won from Aknoor. He lost the 2024 Assembly election to independent candidate Satish Sharma from Chhamb Assembly constituency by 6,929 votes.
