= Daleep Singh Parihar =

Politician in Jammu and Kashmir, India

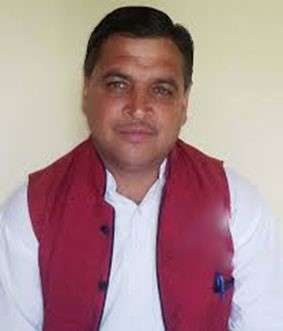

Member of Legislative Assembly
- Incumbent
- Assumed office 2024
- Constituency: Bhaderwah
- In office 2014–2018

Personal details
- Born: Batara, Bhalessa, Bhaderwah, Doda, Jammu and Kashmir
- Party: Bharatiya Janata Party
- Parent: Devi Chand

Daleep Singh Parihar is an Indian politician from Jammu and Kashmir. He is a member of the Jammu and Kashmir Legislative Assembly representing the Bharatiya Janata Party from the Bhaderwah Assembly constituency in Doda district of Jammu and Kashmir, India.

== Career ==
Parihar won from Bhaderwah Assembly constituency representing Bharatiya Janata Party in the 2024 Jammu and Kashmir Legislative Assembly election. He polled 42,128 votes and defeated his nearest rival, former IAS officer Sheikh Mehboob Iqbal of Jammu and Kashmir National Conference, by a margin of 10,130 votes. He first became an MLA winning the 2014 Jammu and Kashmir Legislative Assembly election defeating Mohd Sharief Niaz of Indian National Congress.
