= Ghulam Qadir Ganipuri =

Islamic scholar

Alhaj Ghulam Qadir Ganipuri
- حاجی صاحب بھٹیاس
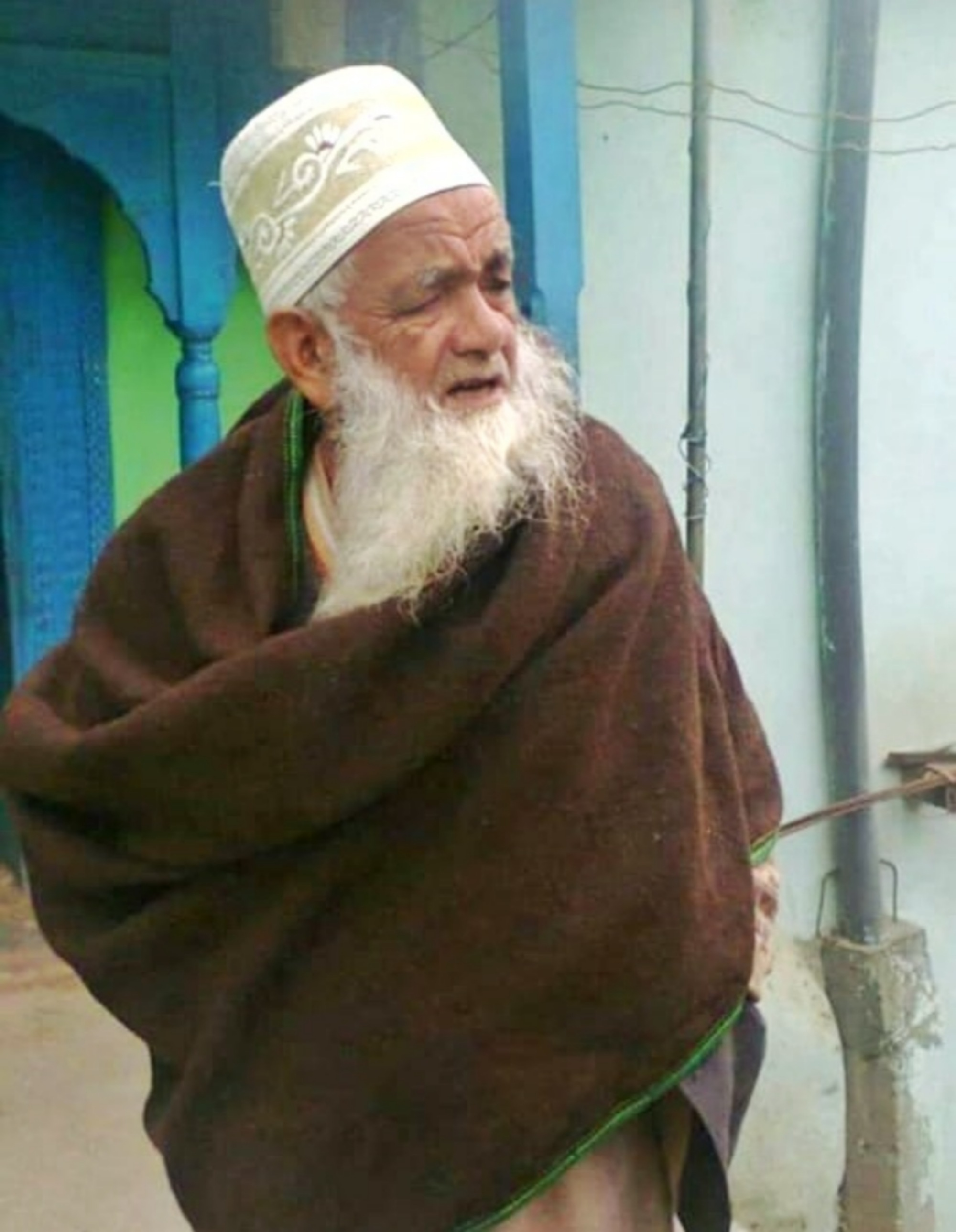
- Title: Sheikh-i-Tareeqat and Ganipuri

Personal life
- Born: Ghulam Qadir Bhat; 22 July 1937 Akhyarpur, Bhalessa, Jammu and Kashmir (princely state)
- Died: 24 July 2015 (aged 78) Akhyarpur, Bhalessa, Jammu and Kashmir (state)
- Education: Aligarh Muslim University
- Known for: Spirituality
- Occupation: Scholar, Teacher

Religious life
- Religion: Islam
- Denomination: Sunni
- Founder of: Jamia Guni tul Uloom Akhyarpur Bhatyas

Muslim leader
- Disciple of: Abdul Gani Sadiqui

Alhaj Ghulam Qadir Ganipuri (22 July 1937 – 24 July 2015) was a Muslim scholar and spiritual leader. He was the founder of Madrasa Jamia Guni tul Uloom Akhyarpur (Bhatyas) in the Bhalessa, Doda district, of India, which was established in 1983 and named after Abdul Gani Sadiqui. Every year, seminars and literary programs are organized in his memory. During the 2014 Kashmir floods, Ganipuri and some NGOs of the Chenab valley helped flood-ravaged houses and families.

== Early life and education ==
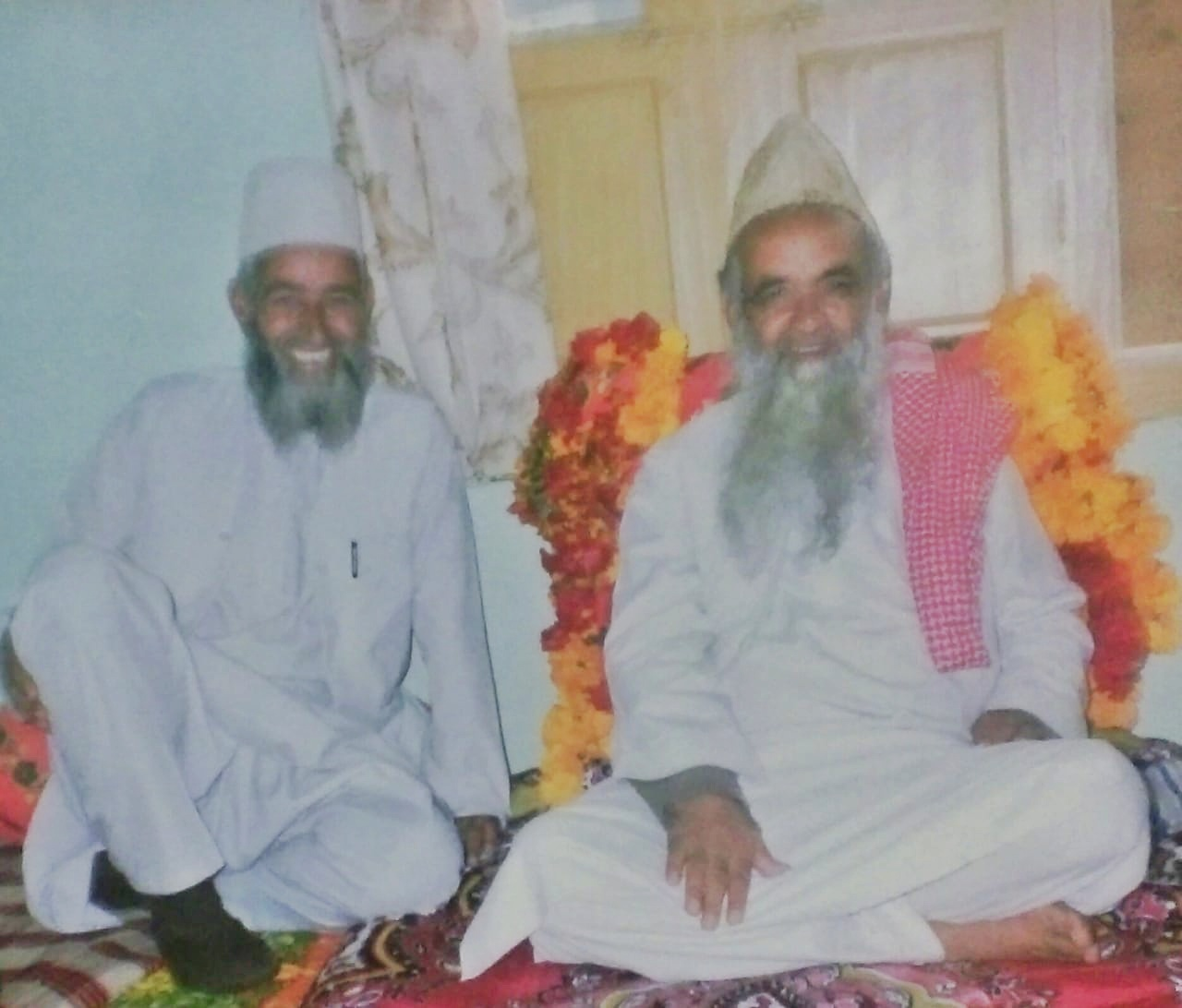
Ghulam Qadir Ganipuri (right) with his close aide Alhaj Dost Mohd Wani (left) in 2002

Ganipuri was born on 22 July 1937, in the Akhyarpur village of Bhatyas (Bhalessa). He graduated from Khilotran High School in 1954. Ganipuri completed his Teacher Training Course from Bhaderwah and his degree and Alim Fazil (post-graduate degree) from Aligarh Muslim University.

== Career ==
Ganipuri was a disciple of Abdul Gani Sadiqui and worked in government schools as a teacher and administrator. In 1956, Ganipuri taught at Thanamandi Rajouri and offered his resignation in under a year, citing personal reasons. In 1957, he began teaching in Ramnagar Udhampur. In 1983, Ganipuri established a madrasa: Madrasa Jamia Guni tul Uloom Akhyarpur Bhatyas, which taught and employed both Hindus and Muslims. He was inspired to do so by Darul Uloom Deoband. As an honored mentor, Ganipuri sat on a mattress in his room where supplicants visited him one by one. Followers considered him a Hakeem and a Murshid (religious teacher). He was so widely respected that Muslims and Hindus would often travel to ask him for spiritual assistance.

Ganipuri wrote 35 books, mostly in Urdu. He also acted as editor and publisher of the annual magazine Jamia Guni tul Uloom Akhyarpur.

== Death ==
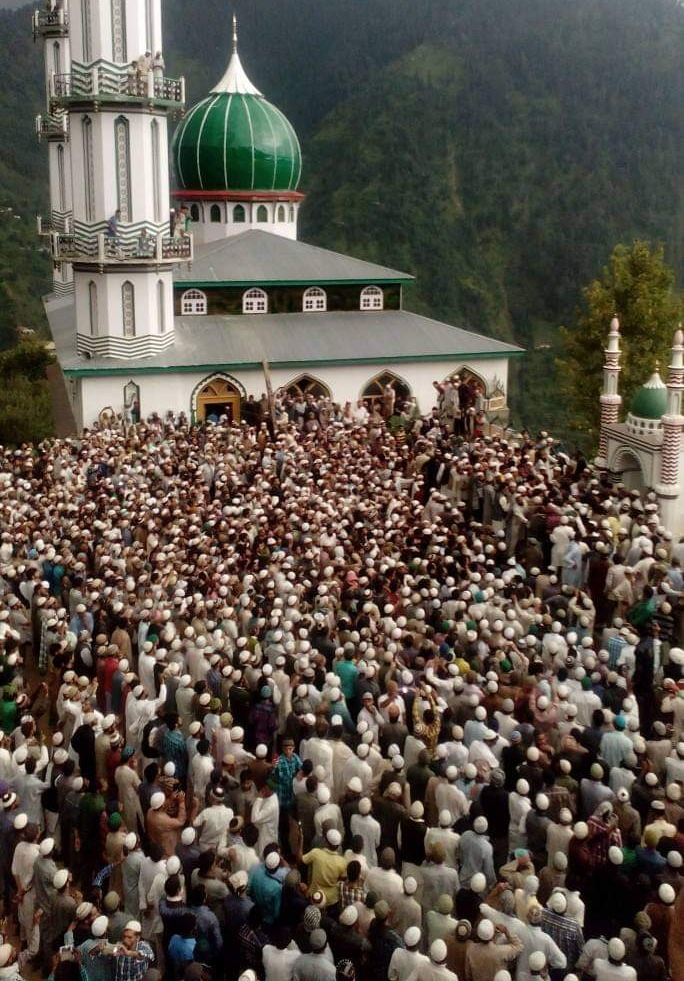
Around 60,000 people attended the funeral of Alhaj Ghulam Qadir Ganipuri in Akhyarpur Bhatyas on 24 July 2015.

Ganipuri died on 24 July 2015, after a prolonged illness. Seminars and other literary programs are held in his memory on the anniversary of his death.
