= Beekeeping in India =

Project

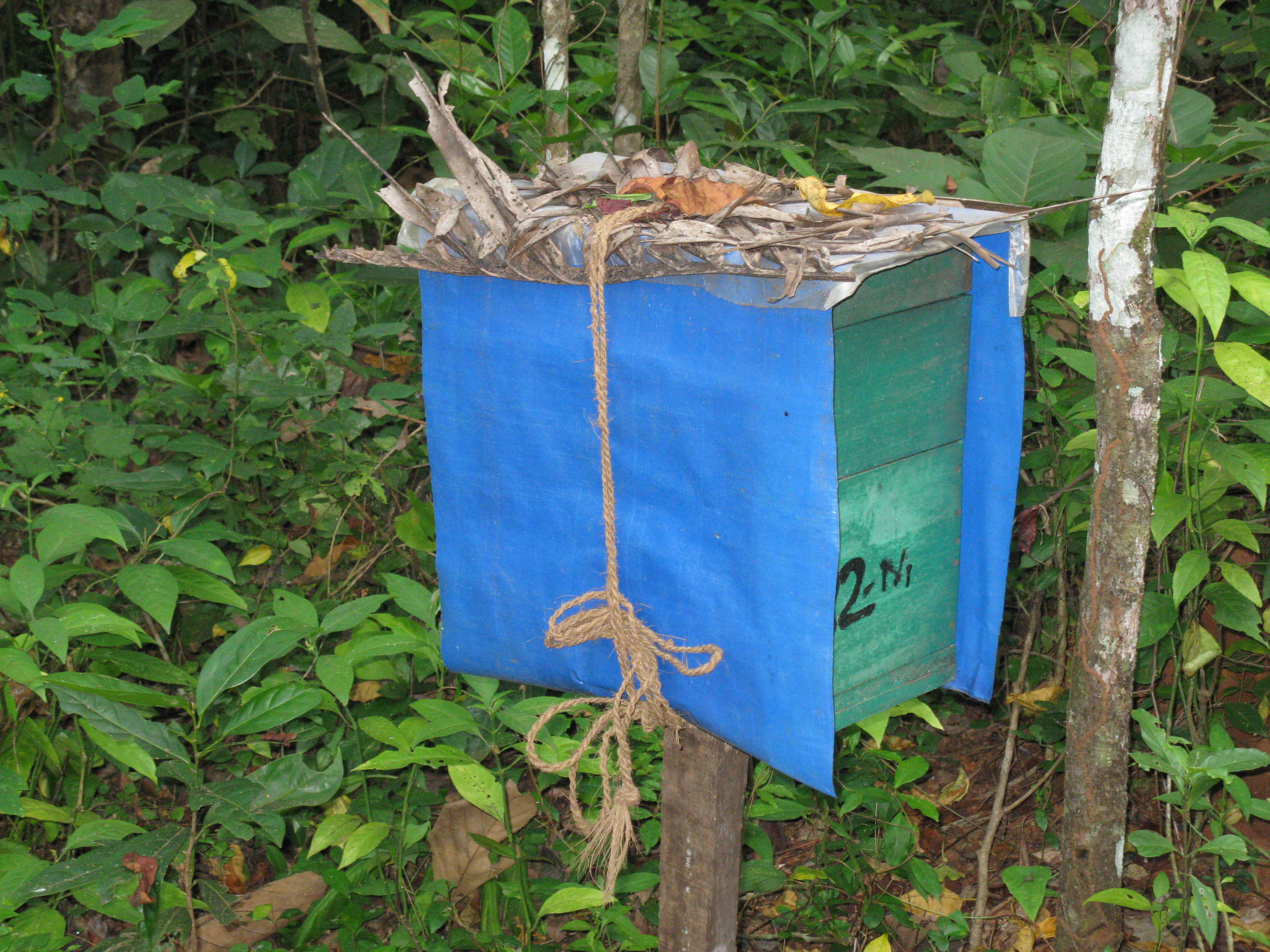
Honey box used by farmers in the Indian state of Kerala

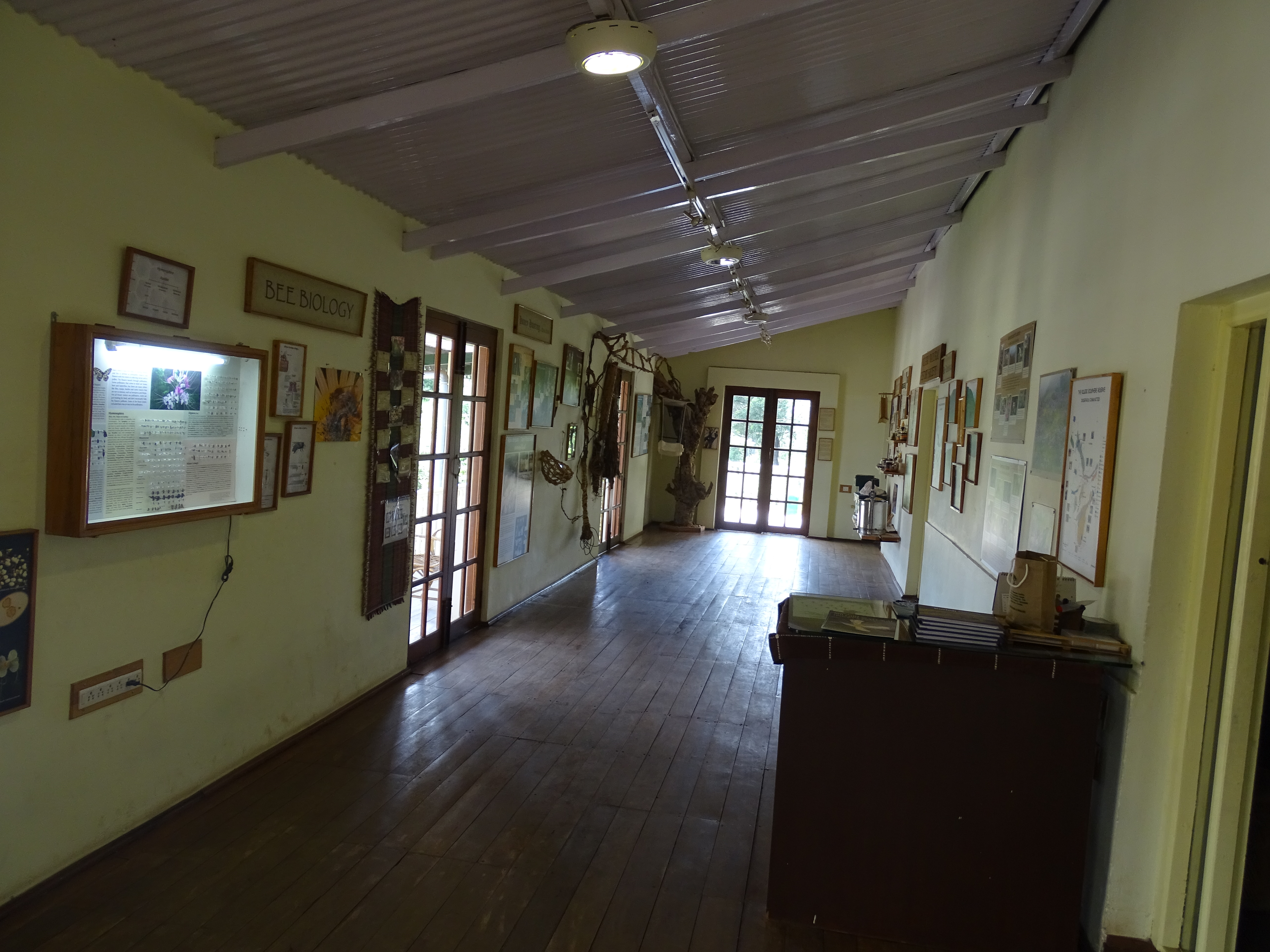
Honey and Bee Museum in Ooty

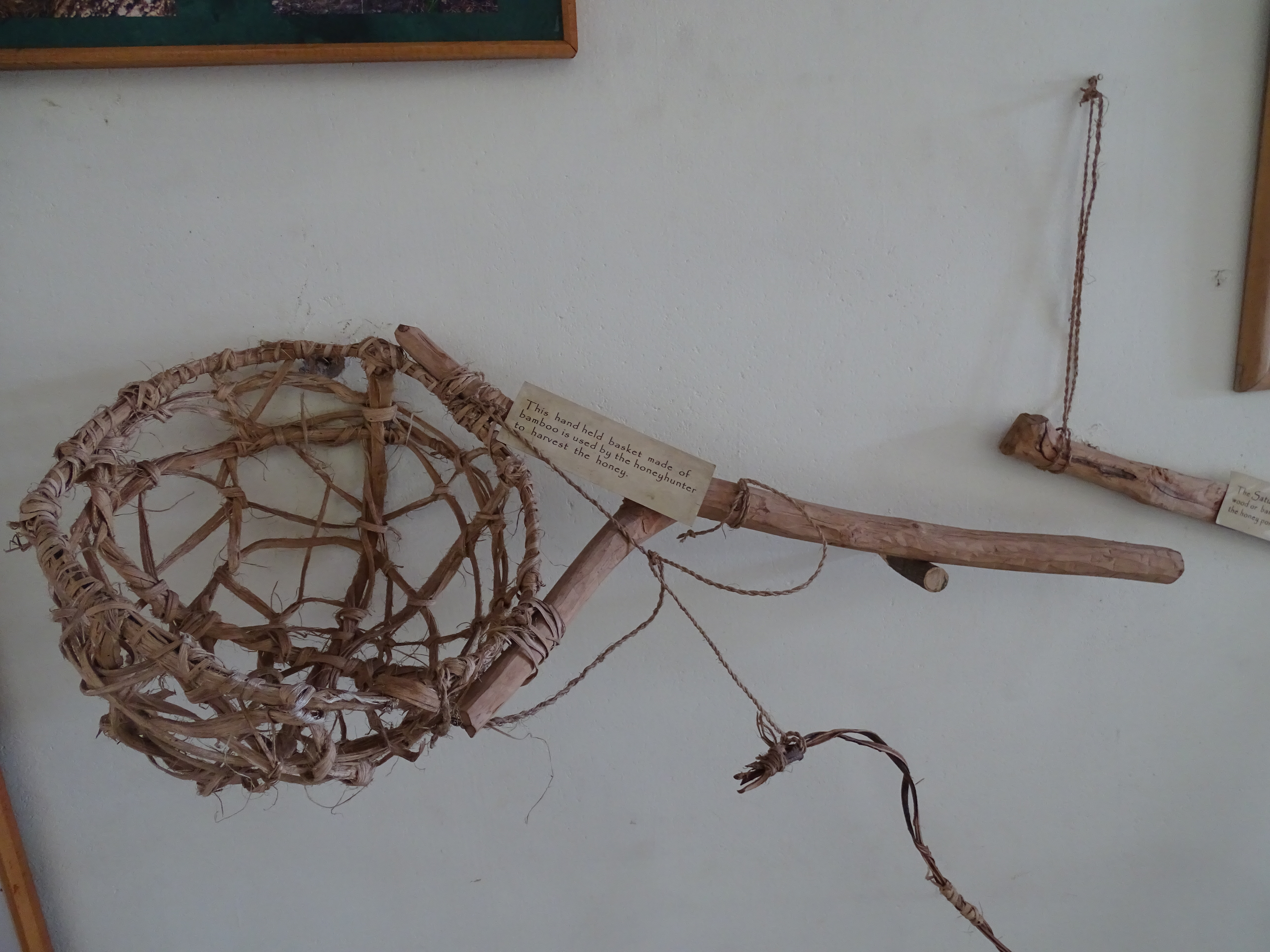
A hand held bamboo basket at display in the Honey and Bee Museum, Ooty. The basket was used to harvest honey by honeyhunters.

Beekeeping in India has been mentioned in ancient Vedas and Buddhist scriptures. Rock paintings of Mesolithic era found in Madhya Pradesh depict honey collection activities. Scientific methods of beekeeping, however, started only in the late 19th century, although records of taming honeybees and using in warfare are seen in the early 19th century. After Indian independence, beekeeping was promoted through various rural developmental programs. Five species of bees that are commercially important for natural honey and beeswax production are found in India.

== History ==
=== Antiquity ===
Bees, honey and beekeeping have been mentioned in various Hindu Vedic scriptures of India like Rig Veda, Atharva Veda, Upanishads, Bhagavad Gita, Markandeya Purana, Raj Nighantu, Bharat Samhita, Arthashastra, and Amar Kosha. Various Buddhist scriptures like Vinaya Pitaka, Abhidhamma Pitaka and Jataka tales also mention bees and honey. Vatsayana's Kamasutra mentions honey to play significant factor in sexual pleasures. The popular epic Ramayana describes a "Madhuban" (literally honey forest) that was cultivated by Sugriva. A different Madhuban is also mentioned in the epic Mahabharata near the present day Mathura where Krishna and Radha used to meet. The forest was used to tame bees to make India "land of honey and milk".

=== Modern history ===
Various rock paintings dating to Mesolithic and post-Mesolithic era are found in the Madhya Pradesh and Pachmarhi regions. The paintings mainly depict honey collection activities in the wild from honey combs of Apis dorsata and Apis cerana bees.

When British attacked the eastern coast of present-day Odisha state in 1842–49, the Kondha tribe is noted to have used tamed bees against them. But little is known about the techniques used by them for taming. Various tribes in the hilly areas of Manipur and Nagaland used wooden logs or earthen wares for beekeeping. But crude methods of squeezing out honey from honeycombs were used that had possibility of adulterating honey with the beeswax and also killing many bees in the process. A hollow bamboo with a nail attached to pierce the comb has been used by Manipuri tribes. The hollow bamboo would allow flowing of honey to another barrel.

Unsuccessful attempts of scientific beekeeping were made in the West Bengal region in 1880 and in Punjab and Kullu regions during 1883–84 to keep Apis cerana. Hand Book of Beekeeping by Douglas, a British officer of Post and Telegraph Department, was the first book published in India in 1884. The first successful attempt was made by Reverend Newton in Kerala when he developed a specifically designed hive and started training rural people during 1911–17 to harvest honey from beekeeping. The design became popularly known as "Newton hive". Considerable beekeeping activities were taken up in Travancore areas in 1917 and in Mysore areas in 1925. The activities gained impetus in Madras regions in 1931, Punjab in 1933 and in Uttar Pradesh in 1938. All India Beekeepers Association was formed during 1938–39 and the first Beekeeping Research Station was established in Punjab in 1945 by the Indian Council of Agricultural Research. Beekeeping was included in a curriculum by the Agriculture College, Coimbatore (now Tamil Nadu Agricultural University) in 1931.

=== Post independence ===
Annual production of Beeswax and Natural Honey
Source: UN Food & Agriculture Organization, FAOSTAT
- Beeswax (in tonnes)
- Natural Honey (in tonnes)

After the Independence of India in 1947, the importance of beekeeping was stressed by Mahatma Gandhi by including it in his rural development programmes. Initially, the beekeeping industry was under the All India Khadi and Village Industries Board which was converted to Khadi and Village Industries Commission (KVIC) in 1956, which in turn was under the Ministry of Industry. In 1962, Central Bee Research and Training Institute was established by KVIC at Pune. Beekeeping was promoted along with rubber plantations in Kerala and Tamil Nadu regions by YMCA and other Christian missionaries. Coorg region of Karnataka and Mahabaleshwar also saw developments in beekeeping. The Ramakrishna Mission promoted it in Northeastern states and West Bengal. The Punjab Agricultural University started research on the topic and promoted it by introducing Apis Mellifera bees.

The production of honey in India increased significantly towards the late 1990s. 70% of honey production comes from informal segments. As major exporter of honey, India falls behind China, Argentina, Germany, Hungary, Mexico and Spain. In 2005, India's honey exports reached a value of US$ 26.4 million. 66% percent of this was consumed by NAFTA countries. US$ 6 million worth of honey was consumed by European Union in which Germany took the most approximating to 75%. In 2005, Saudi Arabia was the only developing country to consume Indian honey of a considerable US$ 2.2 million. India's export in 1996 was far less to approximately US$ 1 million.

As the Nilgiris region of Tamil Nadu in southern India has various tribes of honey collectors, Kotagiri-based Keystone Foundation started a Honey and Bee Museum in 2007 in the town of Ooty in Tamil Nadu to promote beekeeping and techniques involved. The group also opened a restaurant "A Place to Bee" in 2015 at Ooty that specializes in honey recipes.

== Types of bees ==
Six species of bees of commercial importance are found in India; Apis dorsata (Rock bee), the Himalayan species, Apis laboriosa), Apis cerana indica (Indian hive bee), Apis florea (dwarf bee), Apis mellifera (European or Italian bee), and Tetragonula iridipennis (Dammer or stingless bee). Rock bees are aggressive and cannot be maintained but are harvested from the wild. Honey from dwarf bees is also harvested from the wild as these are nomadic and produce very small yields. Native Apis cerana and Apis mellifera introduced from the temperate zone are more amenable to culturing in artificial bee boxes. Dammer bees can be domesticated and are important factors in pollination of various crops but produce little honey.

Average honey yield per year per hive
Bee	Yield
Apis dorsata	36 kilograms (79 lb)
Apis cerana indica	6 kilograms (13 lb) to 8 kilograms (18 lb)
Apis florea	500 grams (18 oz)
Apis mellifera	25 kilograms (55 lb) to 40 kilograms (88 lb)
Tetragonula iridipennis	100 grams (3.5 oz)
