= Bhalesi dialect =

Dialect of Bhadarwahi language

Bhalesi
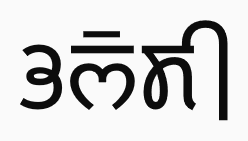
- Bhalesi written in Takri
- Native to: India
- Region: Bhalessa region of Jammu
- Language family: Indo-European: Indo-Iranian; Indo-Aryan; Western Pahari; Bhadarwahi; Bhalesi

Language codes
- ISO 639-3: –
- Glottolog: bhal1244
- ELP: Bhalesi
- Coordinates: 33.03°N 75.90°E

Bhalesi is a Bhadarwahi dialect spoken in the Bhalessa region of Jammu and Kashmir, India. It is a member of the Bhadarwahi group of dialects under the Western Pahari subgroup.

The region is locally known as Bhalessa (with variants like Bhalesh), or as Bhal, and from these terms derive the local names for the dialect: /ˈbʱɑli/ and /bʱəˈleiʃi/ (with variants /bʱəˈleʃi/, /bʱəˈlesi/). The region mostly takes up two adjacent mountain valleys, with the main settlements being Kahra, Gandoh, Kilhotran, Jakyas, Bhatyas, and Juggasar. The neighbouring languages and dialects are Chinali, Pangwali and Chambeali to the south-east, Padri to the north-east, Kishtwari to the north-west, Sarazi to the west, and Bhadarwahi proper to the south.

Features that distinguish Bhalesi from the other Bhadarwahi dialects include the preponderence of diphthongs, and the dropping of /l/ between vowels (e.g. Bhalesi /kɑo/ vs. Bhadarwahi /kɑlo/ 'black').

An unusual feature is found in one of the patterns for the formation of the plural of feminine nouns, adjectives and participles. While some forms add a suffix (/bʱi/ 'a small bee' -> /bʱiɑ̃/ 'small bees'), others will undergo apophony: the final and initial vowels are raised, for example:

- /ˈloʈkɪ/ 'a small jug' -> /ˈluʈki/ 'small jugs'
- /ˈsʊɳɪ/ 'a white ant' -> /syɳi/ 'white ants'
- /ˈɡɛɪ/ 'she went' -> /ˈɡei/ 'they(f) went'

== Bibliography ==
- Kaul, Pritam Krishen (2006). Pahāṛi and Other Tribal Dialects of Jammu. Vol. 1. Delhi: Eastern Book Linkers. ISBN 8178541017.
- Varma, Siddheshwar (1948). The Bhalesī dialect. Monograph series (Royal Asiatic Society of Bengal). Vol. 4. Calcutta.
