= Govind Ram Sharma =

Political figure and leader

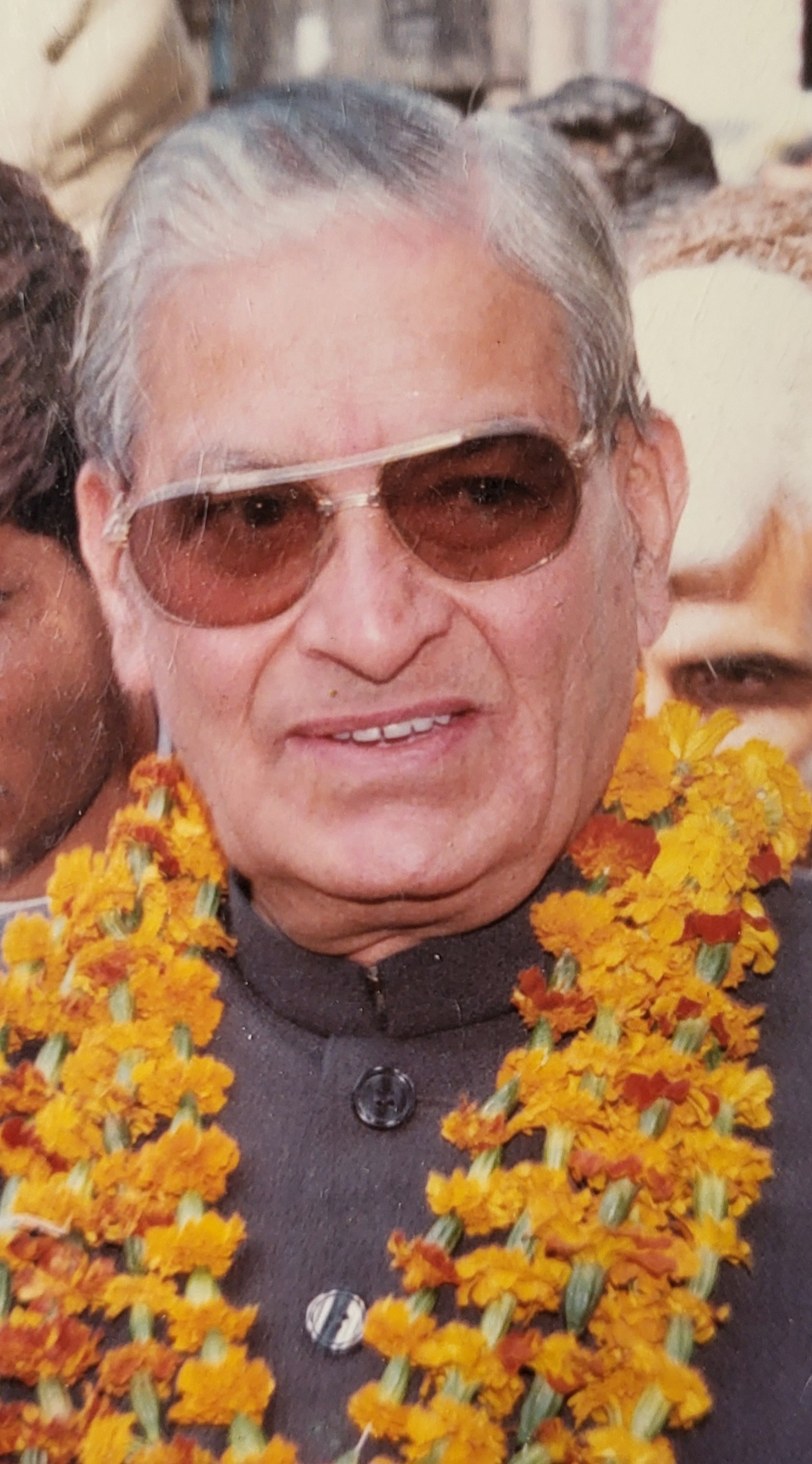
Sharma in July 2024

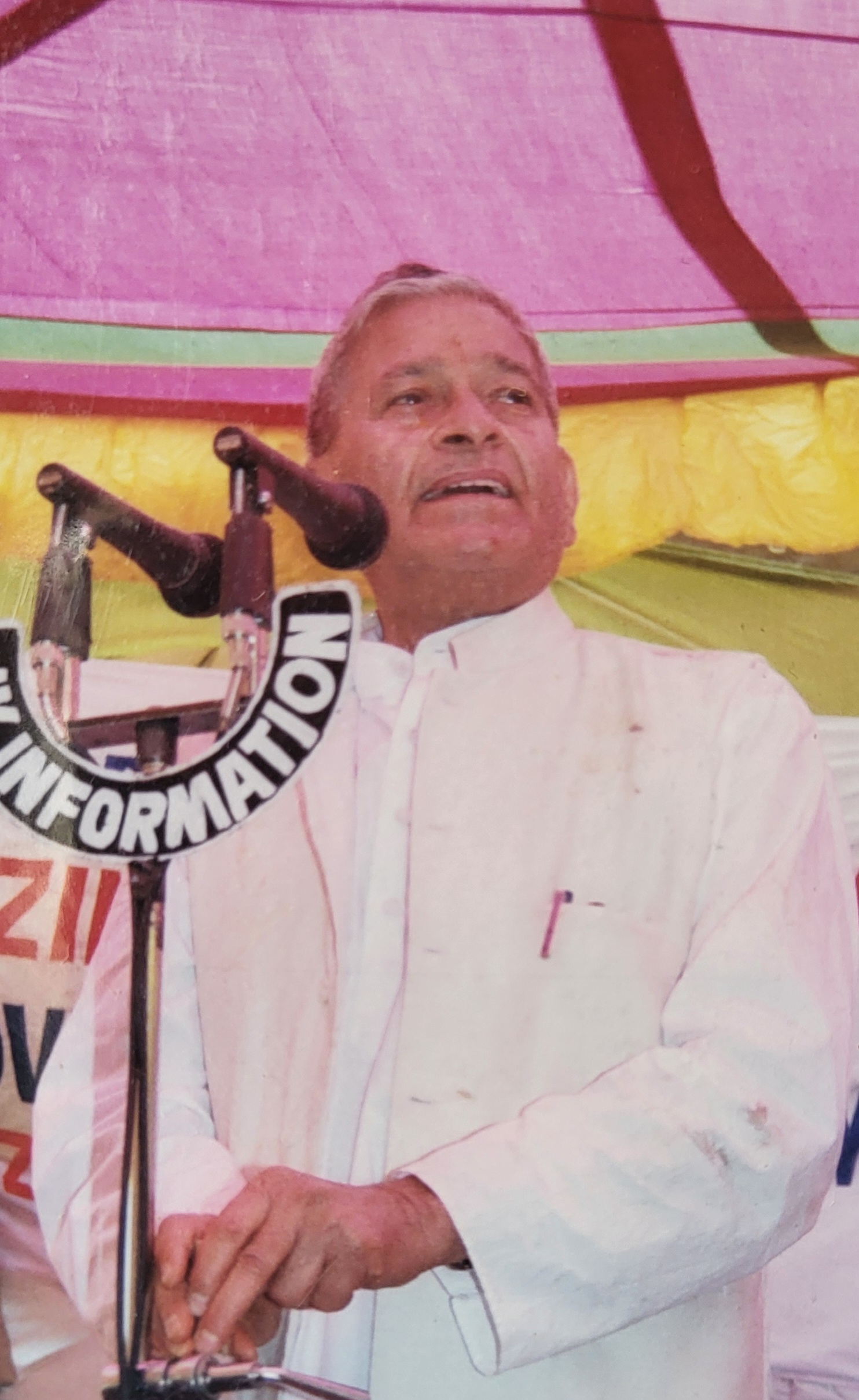

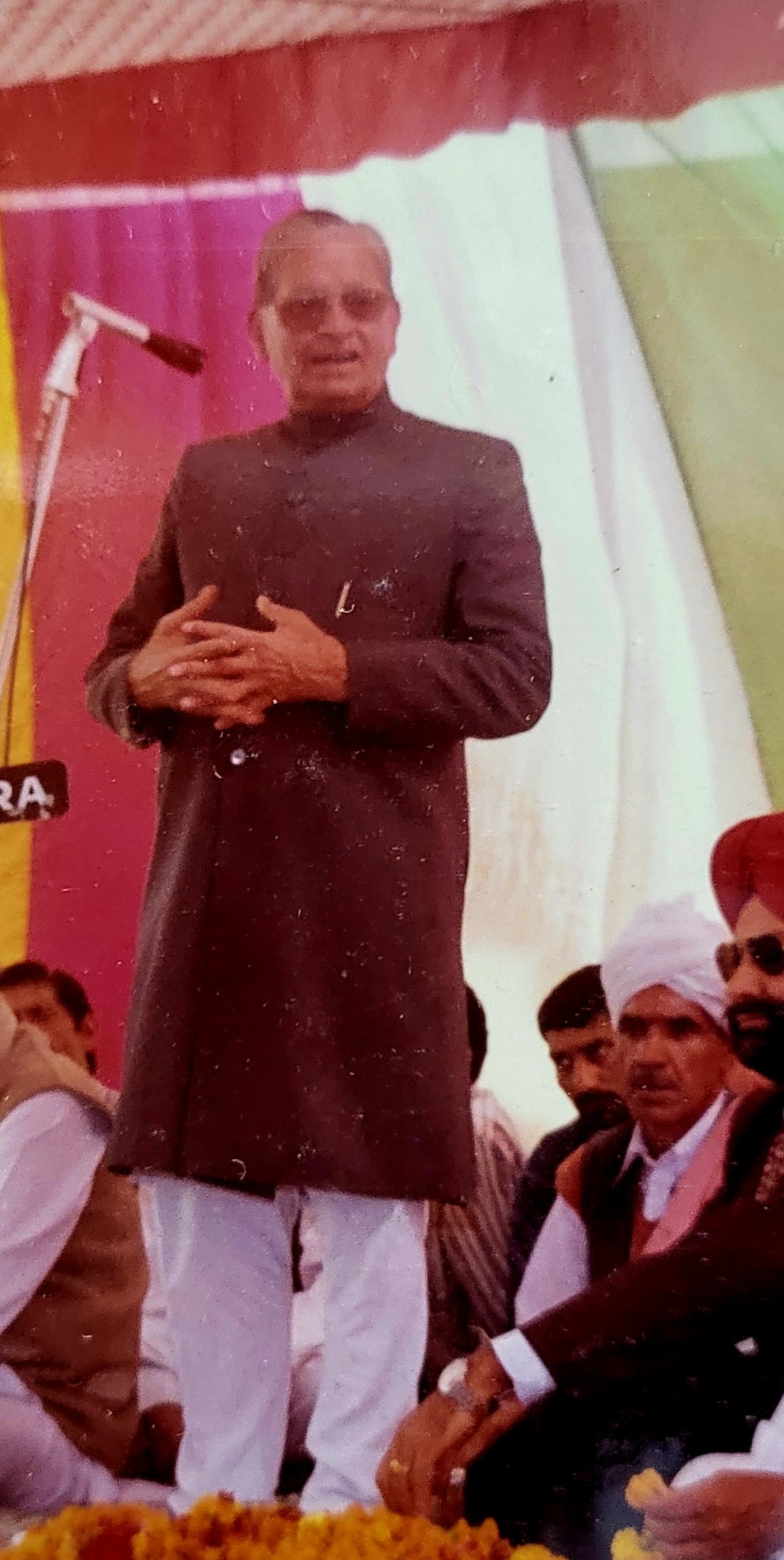

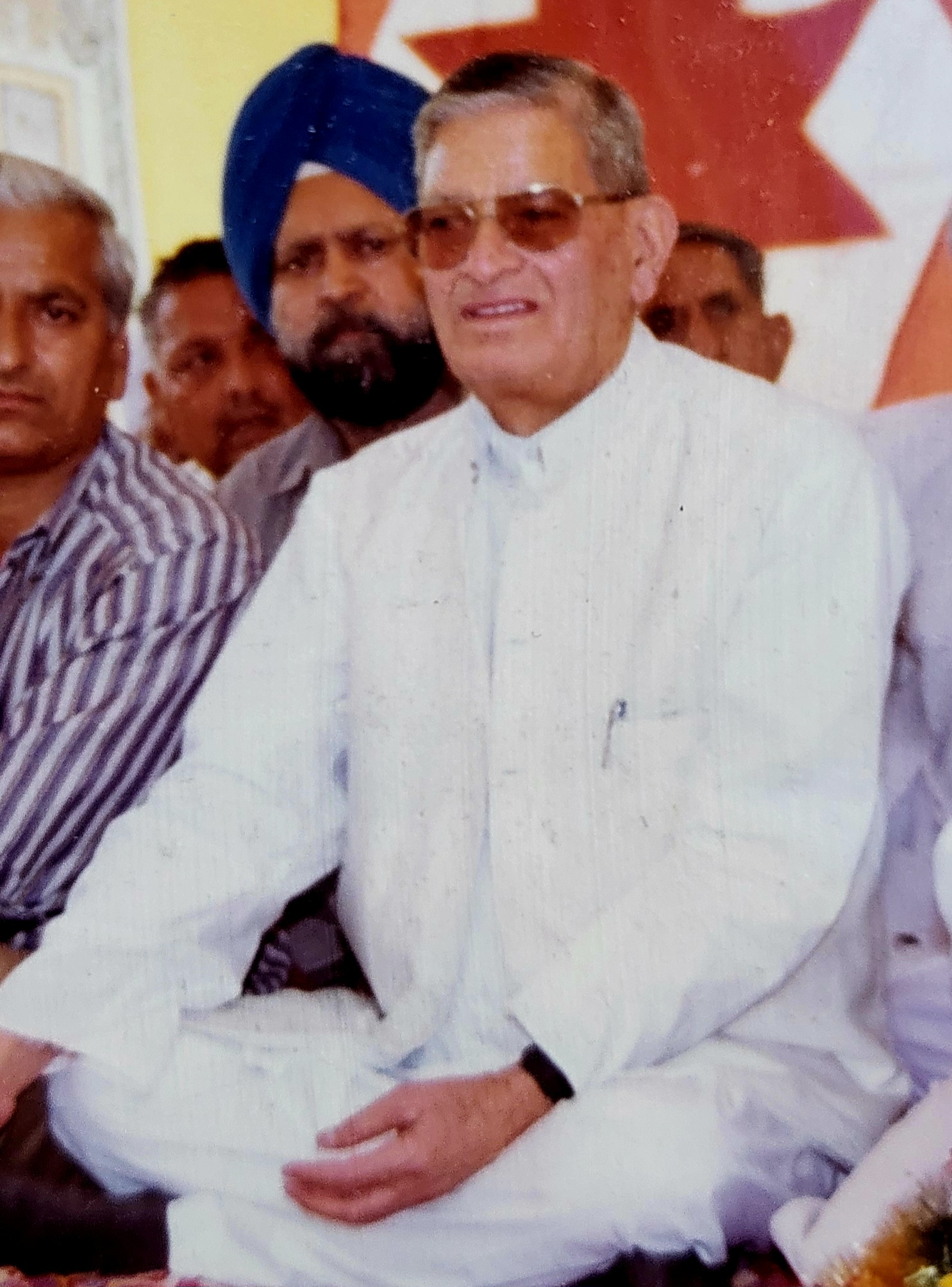

Pandit Govind Ram Sharma (17 August 1930 – 22 April 2024) was an Indian politician and a social reformer. He was a minister in Jammu and Kashmir. He was born on 17 August 1930 in Maira Mandrian. He had a political career spanning over seven decades.

== Political career ==
Sharma's career began in 1951 as a Panchayat member. Over the decades, he played an active role in state politics and was elected as an MLA from the Akhnoor Assembly constituency twice, in 1987 and 1996.

Sharma contested his last election in year 2008 as a BJP candidate. He played a role in 2014 election, where he was instrumental in ensuring the BJP's victory in Akhnoor constituency. He is the only MLA from the Akhnoor constituency to have secured a victory as an independent candidate. He died on 22 April 2024.
