= Bhadarwar, Himachal Pradesh =

Coordinates: 31°41′N 76°47′E

Bhaderwar
- Town
- Interactive map of Bhaderwar
- Country: India
- State: Himachal Pradesh
- District: Mandi

Languages
  - Official: Hindi
- Time zone: UTC+5:30 (IST)
- PIN: 175049
- Vehicle registration: HP-

Bhadarwar is a village in the Sub Tehsil Bhadrota, Sarkaghat subdivision, of the Mandi district of the state of Himachal Pradesh in India. It has (at least) two schools, GSSS Bhaderwar and Disha Public School Bhaderwar. Its postal code is 175049. Bhaderwar is situated at 15 km distant from sarkaghat, 40 km away from district headquarter i.e. Mandi and around 19 km away from holy place Rewalsar. This village is centre of bhadrota valley situated alongside Bhadrota Khad formerly known as Soan Khad.

In later 2019, new subdivisions of HPPWD & HPJSV were created headquartered at Bhaderwar village.

The nearby areas are Baggi, Durgapur, Bhimli, Rohan, Rakhota, Dangaar, Pingla, Baira, Halog, Sadoh, Chaater, Kaledi, Rissa, Surangrdi, Garordu, Gounta, Chimbabalh etc .

Pingla area is famous for mangoes as there was kings heritage orchard situated at Pingla during the reins of princely states.

This area is famous for mangoes & goose berries etc.
