= Volksraad =

The Volksraad was a people's assembly or legislature in Dutch or Afrikaans speaking government.

== Assembly ==
=== South Africa ===
- Volksraad (South African Republic) (1840–1902)
- Volksraad (Natalia Republic), a similar assembly that existed in the Natalia Republic
- Volksraad (Orange Free State), a similar assembly that existed in the Orange Free State until 1902
- Volksraad, the Afrikaans name for the House of Assembly (South Africa) (1910–1994)

=== Indonesia ===
- Volksraad (Dutch East Indies), a consultative council for the Dutch East Indies established in 1918
- Volksraad, a consultative council for Dutch New Guinea (1949–1969)

== Other uses ==
- Volksraad (horse), a New Zealand sire of racehorses
