= Khalu =

- Village
- Location in Punjab, India Khalu (India)
- Coordinates: 31.346323°N 75.297485°E
- Country: India
- State: Punjab
- District: Kapurthala

Government
  - Type: Panchayati raj (India)
  - Body: Gram panchayat

Population (2011)
  - Total: 1,184
- Sex ratio 621/563♂/♀

Languages
  - Official: Punjabi
  - Other spoken: Hindi
- Time zone: UTC+5:30 (IST)
- PIN: 144628
- Telephone code: 01822
- ISO 3166 code: IN-PB
- Vehicle registration: PB-09
- Website: kapurthala.gov.in

Khalu is a village in Kapurthala district of Punjab State, India. It is located 11 kilometres (6.8 mi) from Kapurthala, which is both district and sub-district headquarters of Khalu. The village is administrated by a Sarpanch who is an elected representative of village as per the constitution of India and Panchayati raj (India).

== Demography ==
According to the report published by Census India in 2011, Khalu has 229 houses with the total population of 1,184 persons of which 621 are male and 563 females. Literacy rate of Khalu is 63.39%, lower than the state average of 75.84%. The population of children in the age group 0–6 years is 176 which is 14.86% of the total population. Child sex ratio is approximately 934, higher than the state average of 846.

== Population data ==
Particulars	Total	Male	Female
Total No. of Houses	229	-	-
Population	1,184	621	563
Child (0–6)	176	91	85
Schedule Caste	117	62	55
Schedule Tribe	0	0	0
Literacy	63.39 %	67.55 %	58.79 %
Total Workers	418	343 75	
Main Worker	255	0	0
Marginal Worker	163	109	54
