= Praja Parishad Jammu and Kashmir =

Praja Parishad Jammu and Kashmir (Jammu and Kashmir Popular Association) was a political party in the Indian state of Jammu and Kashmir. PP was floated by dissidents of the Bharatiya Janata Party in January 2005. The name is taken from the Jammu Praja Parishad, which fought against the special status of J&K (Article 370 of the Indian Constitution). The Praja Parishad had merged with the Bharatiya Jana Sangh on 30 December 1963.

The new party was led by Chandermohan Sharma. The party worked for autonomy for the Jammu region. The Jammu Praja Parishad party launched its first satyagraha in Jammu and Kashmir on 14 November 1952 for the scrapping of the Article 370.
