= Sham Lal Sharma =

Indian politician

Member of Jammu and Kashmir Legislative Assembly
- Incumbent
- Assumed office 8 October 2024
- Constituency: Jammu North

Personal details
- Party: Bharatiya Janata Party
- Profession: Politician

Sham Lal Sharma is an Indian politician from Jammu & Kashmir. He is a Member of the Jammu & Kashmir Legislative Assembly from 2024, representing Jammu North Assembly constituency as a Member of the Bharatiya Janta Party. He represented Akhnoor Constituency in 2004 By Elections and 2008 State Elections, also served as Cabinet Minister in NC-Congress Led Coalition Government 2009–2014.
