= 2019 Indian general election in Jammu and Kashmir =

Indian lower house election in Jammu & Kashmir

- 11,18,23,29 April 2019; 6 May 2019

6 seats
- Turnout: 44.97% (▼4.75%)
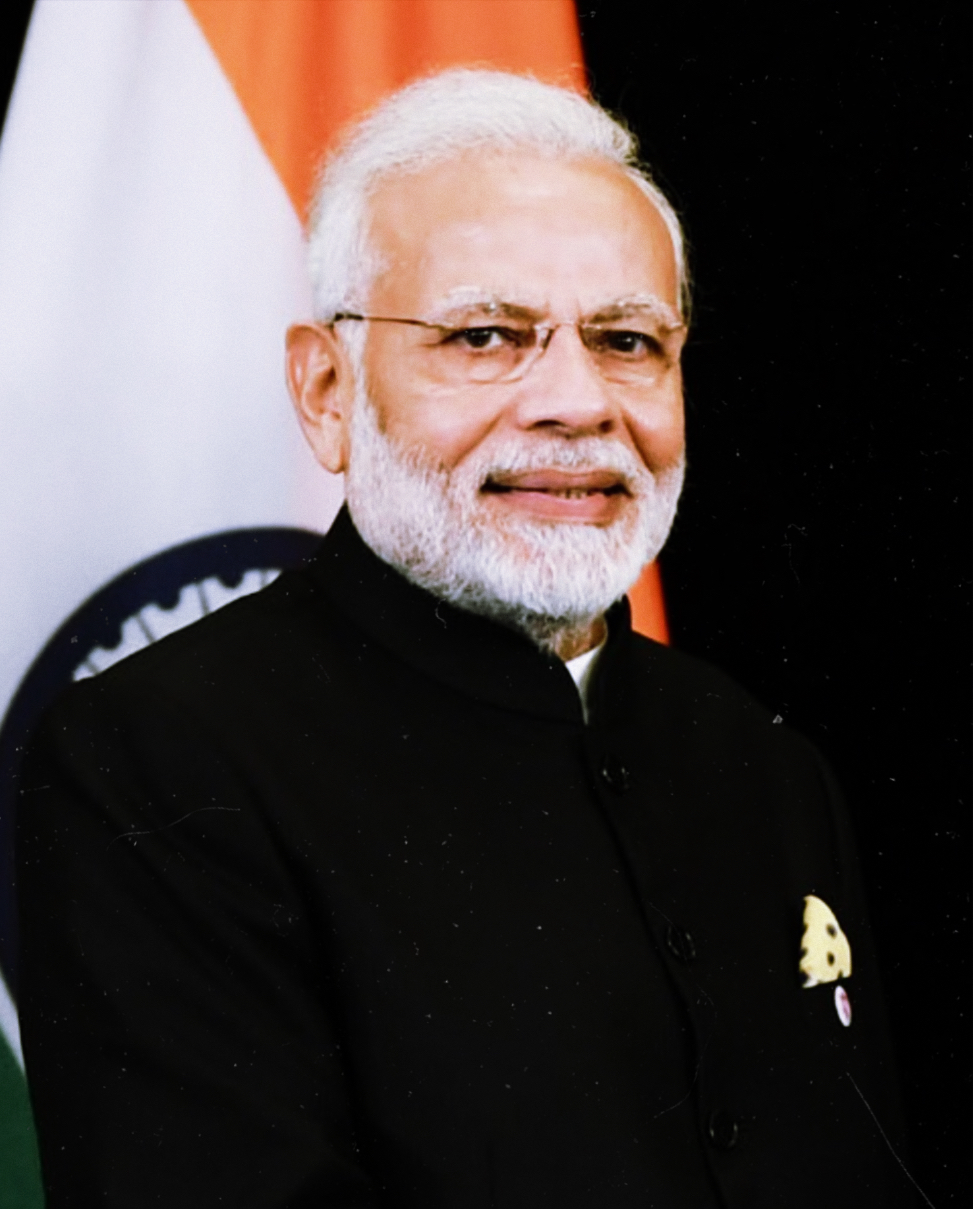

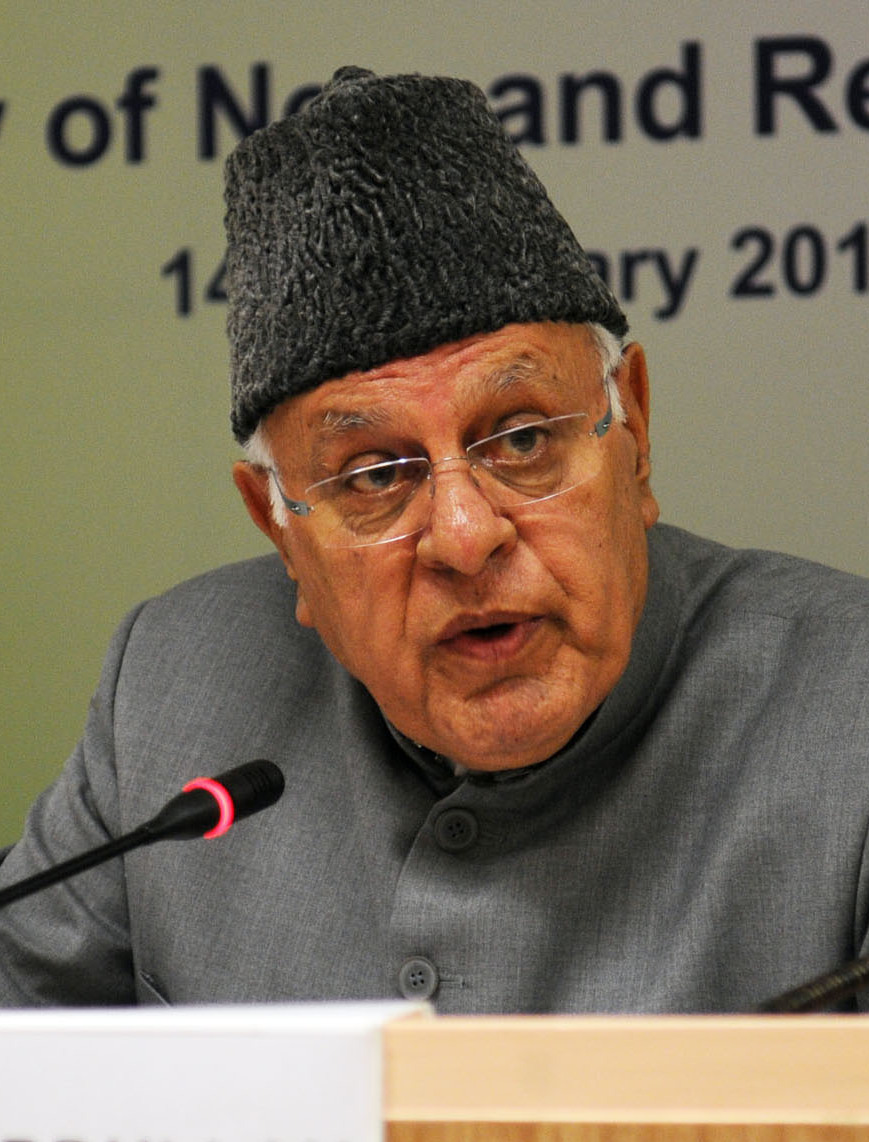

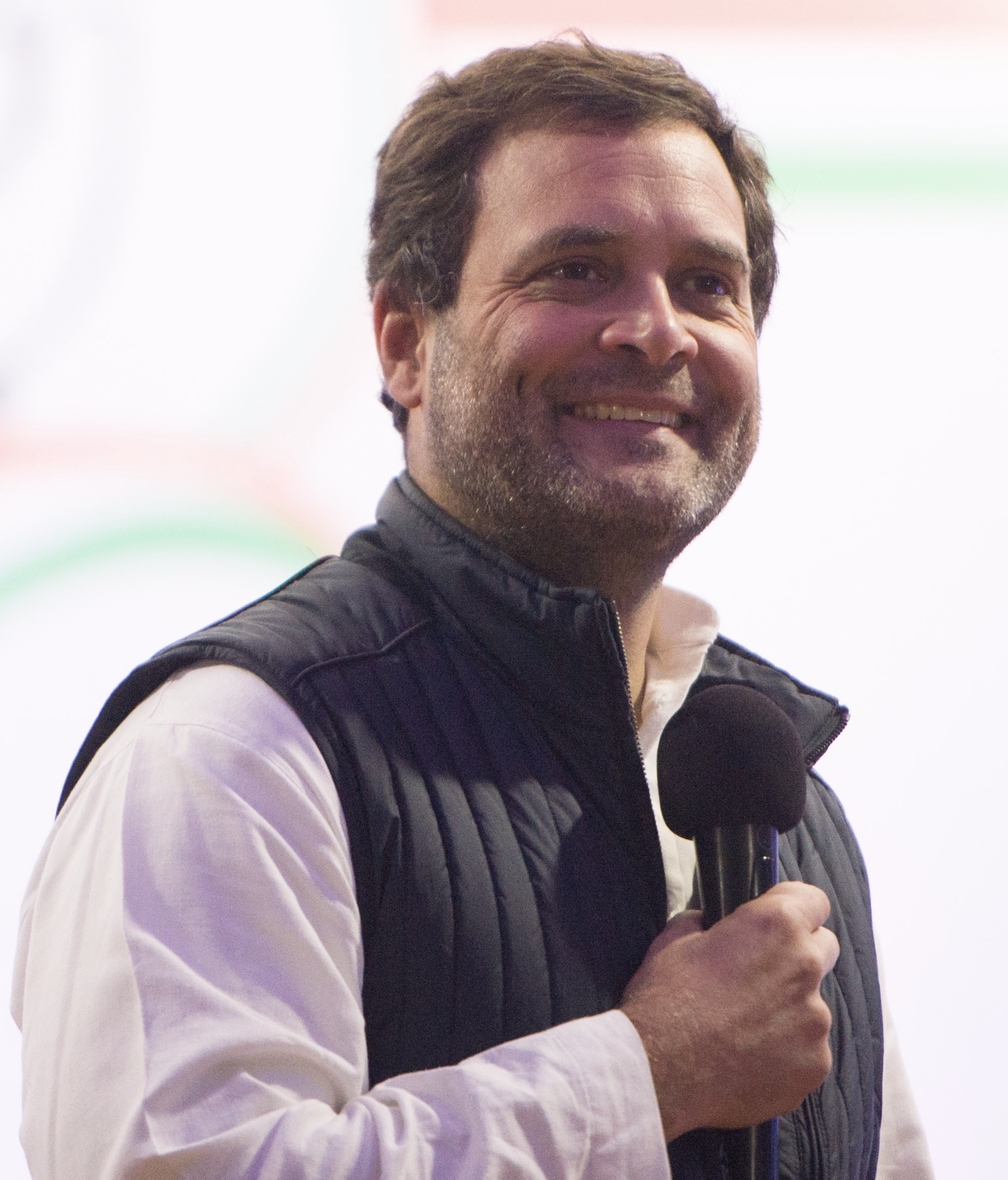
	First party	Second party	Third party
Leader	Narendra Modi	Farooq Abdullah	Rahul Gandhi
Party	BJP	JKNC	INC
Alliance	NDA	-	UPA
Last election	3	0	0
Seats won	3	3	0
Seat change	Steady	▲3	Steady
Percentage	46.4%	7.9%	28.5%
Swing	▲11.99%	▼3.21%	▲5.6%
- Result of the 2019 Lok Sabha election in Jammu and Kashmir
Prime Minister before election
Narendra Modi
BJP
Prime Minister after election
Narendra Modi
BJP

The 2019 Indian general election in Jammu and Kashmir was held for 6 seats in the state. The voting process was held in five phases on 11, 18, 23, 29 April and 6 May 2019.The Bharatiya Janata Party and the Jammu and Kashmir National Conference won 3 seats each with the BJP getting an impressive 46.4% votes hare. JKNC's vote share was 7.9%.

This was the last general election before the state's special status was revoked and later that same year the state was reconstituted into two union territories.

== Parties and alliances ==
Party	Flag	Symbol	Leader	Seats contested
Bharatiya Janata Party			Narendra Modi	6
Indian National Congress			Rahul Gandhi	5
Jammu & Kashmir National Conference			Farooq Abdullah	3
Jammu & Kashmir Peoples Democratic Party			Mehbooba Mufti	3

== Candidates ==
Constituency		BJP		INC		JKNC		JKPDP	
#	Name	Party	Candidate	Party	Candidate	Party	Candidate	Party	Candidate
1	Baramulla	BJP	M. M. War	INC	Haji Farooq Ahmad Mir	JKNC	Md. Akbar Lone	JKPDP	Abdul Qayoom Wani
2	Srinagar	BJP	Khalid Jahangir			JKNC	Farooq Abdullah	JKPDP	Aga Syed Mohsin
3	Anantnag	BJP	Sofi Yousuf	INC	Ghulam Ahmad Mir	JKNC	Hasnain Masoodi	JKPDP	Mehbooba Mufti
4	Ladakh	BJP	J. T. Namgyal	INC	Rigzin Spalbar				
5	Udhampur	BJP	Jitendra Singh	INC	Vikramaditya Singh				
6	Jammu	BJP	Jugal Kishore Sharma	INC	Raman Bhalla				

== Result ==
=== Party Wise ===
Party	BJP	JKNC	INC	JKPDP
Votes	46.99 1,648,041	7.87%, 280,356	28.38%, 1,011,527	3.38%, 1,20,754
Seats	3 (50%)	3 (50%)	0 (0%)	0 (0%)
Seats	3 / 6	3 / 6	0 / 6	0 / 6

=== Detailed Results ===
Party Name	Popular vote			Seats		
Party Name	Votes	%	±pp	Contested	Won	+/−
BJP	1,648,041	46.39	▲14.03	6	3	Steady
INC	1,011,527	28.47	▲5.62	5	0	Steady
JKNC	280,356	7.89	▼3.23	3	3	▲3
JKPC	133,612	3.76	Steady	3	0	Steady
JKPDP	120,754	3.40	▼17.14	3	0	▼3
Others	110,354	3.11	Steady	23	0	Steady
IND	226,239	6.37	▲0.10	36	0	Steady
NOTA	21,739	0.61	▼0.27			
Total	3,552,622	100	-	79	6	-

=== Detailed Results ===
Constituency		Winner				Runner Up				Margin	%
#	Name	Candidate	Party	Votes	%	Candidate	Party	Votes	%	Margin	%
1	Baramulla	Mohammad Akbar Lone	JKNC	133,426	29.26	Raja Aijaz Ali	JKPC	103,193	22.63	30,233	6.63
2	Srinagar	Farooq Abdullah	JKNC	106,750	57.13	Aga Syed Mohsin	JKPDP	36,700	19.64	70,050	37.49
3	Anantnag	Hasnain Masoodi	JKNC	40,180	32.02	Ghulam Ahmad Mir	INC	33,504	26.70	6,676	5.32
4	Ladakh	Jamyang Tsering Namgyal	BJP	42,914	33.70	Sajjad Hussain	IND	31,984	25.12	10,930	8.58
5	Udhampur	Dr. Jitendra Singh	BJP	724,311	61.24	Vikramaditya Singh	INC	367,059	31.04	357,252	30.20
6	Jammu	Jugal Kishore	BJP	858,066	57.81	Raman Bhalla	INC	555,191	37.40	302,875	20.41

== Post-election Union Council of Ministers from Jammu and Kashmir ==
#	Name	Constituency	Designation	Department	From	To	Party
1	Dr. Jitendra Singh	Udhampur	MoS (I/C)	Ministry of Development of North Eastern Region	31 May 2019	7 July 2021	BJP
1	Dr. Jitendra Singh	Udhampur	MoS	Prime Minister's Office	31 May 2019	9 June 2024	BJP
1	Dr. Jitendra Singh	Udhampur	MoS	Ministry of Personnel, Public Grievances and Pensions	31 May 2019	9 June 2024	BJP
1	Dr. Jitendra Singh	Udhampur	MoS	Department of Atomic Energy	31 May 2019	9 June 2024	BJP
1	Dr. Jitendra Singh	Udhampur	MoS	Department of Space	31 May 2019	9 June 2024	BJP
1	Dr. Jitendra Singh	Udhampur	MoS (I/C)	Ministry of Science and Technology	7 July 2021	9 June 2024	BJP
1	Dr. Jitendra Singh	Udhampur	MoS (I/C)	Ministry of Earth Sciences	7 July 2021	18 May 2023	BJP

== Assembly segments wise lead of Parties ==
2019 Jammu and Kashmir Lok Sabha Elections Assembly Wise Leads Map

Party	Assembly segments	Position in Assembly (as of 2014 election)
Bharatiya Janata Party	29	25
Jammu & Kashmir National Conference	30	15
Indian National Congress	16	12
Jammu and Kashmir Peoples Democratic Party	4	28
Jammu and Kashmir People's Conference	2	2
Others	6	3
Total	87	
