= Satish Sharma (politician) =

Indian politician

Cabinet Minister, Government of Jammu and Kashmir
- In office 16 October 2024 – 27 October 2026
- Lieutenant Governor: Manoj Sinha
- Chief Minister: Omar Abdullah
- Ministry and Departments: Food, Civil Supplies & Consumer Affairs; Transport, Science & Technology; Information Technology; Youth Services & Sports; ARI & Training
- Succeeded by: N/A

Member of the Jammu and Kashmir Legislative Assembly
- Incumbent
- Assumed office 8 October 2024
- Preceded by: Kirshan Lal
- Constituency: Chhamb

Personal details
- Born: Jammu and Kashmir, India
- Party: Independent
- Other political affiliations: Indian National Congress (Before 2024)
- Relations: Madan Lal Sharma (father); Sham Lal Sharma (uncle)
- Education: Dogra Law College (LL.B); University of Wales (MBA)

Satish Sharma is an Indian politician from Jammu and Kashmir,who served as the cabinet minister in the government of Jammu and Kashmir(2024-2026). He is a member of Jammu and Kashmir Legislative Assembly. Sharma won 2024 assembly election from Chhamb as an independent candidate and later gave his support to Omar Abdullaah and his party National conference Government.

== Life and education ==
Sharma was born in a Dogra Brahmin family in Jammu. Sharma comes from political background being the son of late senior Congress leader Madan Lal Sharma. He did his LL.B from Dogra Law College and received his MBA degree from University of Wales in 2008.

== Career ==
Sharma political career began when he unsuccessfully contested from Bhalwal Brahmana constituency in 2020 District Development Councils elections and independent candidate.

In 2024 Jammu and Kashmir Legislative Assembly election, Sharma contested from Chhamb Assembly constituency and won with a margin of 6929 votes, defeating former MLA Rajeev Sharma of BJP and former deputy chief minister, Tara Chand of Congress. On 16 October 2024, he was sworn in as the cabinet minister in the newly formed government of Jammu and Kashmir. On 18 October 2024, following an order issued by Lieutenant Governor Sinha to allocate portfolios to council of ministers on the advice of chief minister, Sharma was given the charge of Food, Civil Supplies and Consumer Affairs, Transport, Science and Technology, Information Technology, Youth Services and Sports and ARI and Trainings.

== See also ==
- 2024 Jammu & Kashmir Legislative Assembly election
- Jammu and Kashmir Legislative Assembly
