= Jammu Lok Sabha constituency =

Lok Sabha constituency in Jammu and Kashmir

Coordinates: 32.7°N 74.9°E

Jammu JK-5
- Lok Sabha constituency
- Interactive Map Outlining Jammu Lok Sabha constituency

Constituency details
- Country: India
- Region: North India
- State: Jammu and Kashmir
- Assembly constituencies: Gulabgarh; Reasi; Shri Mata Vaishno Devi; Ramgarh; Vijaypur; Nagrota; Jammu East; Jammu North; Jammu West; Bishnah; Ranbir Singh Pura; Bahu; Suchetgarh; Marh; Akhnoor; Kalakote-Sunderbani; Chhamb; Samba
- Established: 1962
- Total electors: 17,80,835
- Reservation: None

Member of Parliament
- 18th Lok Sabha
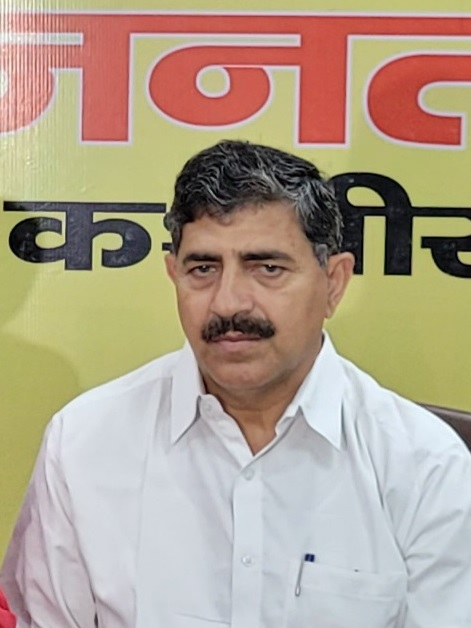
- Incumbent Jugal Kishore Sharma
- Party: BJP
- Alliance: NDA
- Elected year: 2024

Jammu Lok Sabha constituency is one of the five Lok Sabha (parliamentary) constituencies in Jammu and Kashmir union territory of in northern India. This constituency was created in 1962.

== Assembly segments ==
AC No.	AC Name	District	Member	Party
56	Gulabgarh (ST)	Reasi	Khurshied Ahmed	JKNC
57	Reasi	Reasi	Kuldeep Raj Dubey	BJP
58	Shri Mata Vaishno Devi	Reasi	Baldev Raj Sharma	BJP
69	Ramgarh (SC)	Samba	Devinder Kumar Manyal	BJP
70	Samba	Samba	Surjeet Singh Slathia	BJP
71	Vijaypur	Samba	Chander Prakash Ganga	BJP
72	Bishnah (SC)	Jammu	Rajeev Kumar	BJP
73	Suchetgarh (SC)	Jammu	Gharu Ram Bhagat	BJP
74	RS Pora-Jammu South	Jammu	Narinder Singh Raina	BJP
75	Bahu	Jammu	Vikram Randhawa	BJP
76	Jammu East	Jammu	Yudhvir Sethi	BJP
77	Nagrota	Jammu	Devyani Singh Rana	BJP
78	Jammu West	Jammu	Arvind Gupta	BJP
79	Jammu North	Jammu	Sham Lal Sharma	BJP
80	Marh (SC)	Jammu	Surinder Kumar	BJP
81	Akhnoor (SC)	Jammu	Mohan Lal	BJP
82	Chhamb	Jammu	Satish Sharma	IND
83	Kalakote-Sunderbani	Rajouri	Randhir Singh	BJP

== Members of Parliament ==
Year	Winner	Party
1962	Inder Jit Malhotra	Indian National Congress
1967	Inder Jit Malhotra	Indian National Congress
1971	Inder Jit Malhotra	Indian National Congress
1977	Thakur Baldev Singh	Independent
1980	Girdhari Lal Dogra	Indian National Congress
1984	Janak Raj Gupta	Indian National Congress
1989	Janak Raj Gupta	Indian National Congress
1996	Mangat Ram Sharma	Indian National Congress
1998	Vishno Datt Sharma	Bharatiya Janata Party
1999	Vishno Datt Sharma	Bharatiya Janata Party
^2002	Chowdhary Talib Hussain	Jammu & Kashmir National Conference
2004	Madan Lal Sharma	Indian National Congress
2009	Madan Lal Sharma	Indian National Congress
2014	Jugal Kishore Sharma	Bharatiya Janata Party
2019	Jugal Kishore Sharma	Bharatiya Janata Party
2024	Jugal Kishore Sharma	Bharatiya Janata Party

^ by poll

== Election results ==
Vote share of Winning candidates
2024	53.46%
2019	58.02%
2014	49.34%
2009	45.25%
2004	38.94%
2002 (By-Poll)	34.87%
1999	43.46%
1998	43.26%
1996	34.24%
1989	41.82%
1984	46.51%
1980	62.46%
1977	44.60%
1971	60.04%
1967	48.42%

=== 2024 ===
2024 Indian general election: Jammu
Party	Candidate	Votes	%	±%
BJP	Jugal Kishore Sharma	687,588	53.46	▼4.56
INC	Raman Bhalla	552,090	42.93	▲5.39
BSP	Jagdish Raj	10,300	0.81	▼0.16
NOTA	None of the Above	4,645	0.36	▲0.18
Majority		135,498	10.53	▼9.95
Turnout		1,302,176	72.22	▼0.28
BJP hold		Swing	▼4.56	

=== 2019 ===
2019 Indian general elections: Jammu
Party	Candidate	Votes	%	±%
BJP	Jugal Kishore Sharma	858,066	58.02	▲8.68
INC	Raman Bhalla	555,191	37.54	▲8.67
BSP	Badri Nath	14,276	0.97	▼1.51
JKNPP	Prof. Bhim Singh	4,016	0.27	▼0.45
Independent	Subhash Chander	3,739	0.25	New
SS	Manish Sahni	1,192	0.08	New
NOTA	None of the Above	2,618	0.18	▼0.17
Majority		302,875	20.48	▲0.01
Turnout		1,484,387	72.50	▲4.67
BJP hold		Swing		

=== 2014 ===
2014 Indian general elections: Jammu
Party	Candidate	Votes	%	±%
BJP	Jugal Kishore Sharma	619,995	49.34	▲18.46
INC	Madan Lal Sharma	362,715	28.87	▼16.38
JKPDP	Yashpal Sharma	168,554	13.41	▲2.32
BSP	Ashok Kumar	31,199	2.48	▼3.44
JKNPP	Hari Chand Jalmeria	9,071	0.72	New
NOTA	None of the Above	4,382	0.35	New
Majority		257,280	20.47	▲6.07
Turnout		1,253,593	67.83	▲18.71
BJP gain from INC		Swing	▲4.31	

=== 2009 ===
2009 Indian general elections: Jammu
Party	Candidate	Votes	%	±%
INC	Madan Lal Sharma	382,305	45.25	
BJP	Lila Karan Sharma	260,932	30.88	
JKPDP	S. Tarlok Singh	93,730	11.09	
BSP	Hussain Ali	49,988	5.92	
Majority		121,373	14.40	
Turnout		842,899	49.12	
INC hold		Swing		

=== 2004 ===
2004 Indian general election: Jammu
Party	Candidate	Votes	%	±%
INC	Madan Lal Sharma	319,994	38.94	
BJP	Dr. Nirmal Singh	302,426	36.81	
JKNC	Surjit Singh Slathia	120,397	14.65	
BSP	Tirath Kumar	29,498	3.59	
IND	15 Independent Candidates	27,382	3.33	
OTH	7 Other Party Candidates	21,973	2.67	
Majority		17,568	2.13	
Turnout				
Swing to INC from JKNC		Swing		

=== 2002 by-election ===
2002 Jammu by-election
Party	Candidate	Votes	%	±%
JKNC	Chowdhary Talib Hussain	253,891	34.87	
BJP	Dr. Nirmal Kumar Singh	198,402	27.24	
INC	Madan Lal Sharma	186,124	25.56	
BSP	Sheikh Abdul Rehman	46,608	6.40	
JKPDP	Master Tasadiq Hussain	20,354	2.79	
JKNPP	Prof. Bhim Singh	11,113	1.53	
IND	Er. Tahir Naseem Manhas	3,697	0.51	
JD(S)	Dhanraj Bargotra	1,275	0.18	
IND	Om Prakash Sharma	1,236	0.17	
IND	Koshal Sharma	1,129	0.16	
IND	Zahir Abbas	1,092	0.15	
IND	Subash Sharma	914	0.13	
IND	Vinay Kumar	756	0.10	
IND	Surjit Singh 'G' Sitara	679	0.09	
IND	Chouwdhary Ram Saroop	661	0.08	
IND	Jagdish Raj	304	0.04	
Majority		55,489	7.63	
Turnout				
Swing to JKNC from BJP		Swing		

=== 1999 ===
1999 Indian general election: Jammu
Party	Candidate	Votes	%	±%
BJP	Vishno Datt Sharma	289,412	43.46	
JKNC	Rajinder Singh Chib	147,393	22.13	
INC	Madan Lal Sharma	126,356	18.97	
BSP	Makhan Singh	53,665	8.06	
IND	Sardar Tarlok Singh	15,598	2.34	
IND	Qammar Rabbani	7,890	1.18	
SJP(R)	Shamsher Singh Bhau	7,041	1.06	
IND	7 Independent Candidates	8,345	1.27	
OTH	8 Other Party Candidates	10,221	1.53	
Majority		142,019	21.33	
Turnout		676,708	46.77	
BJP hold		Swing		

=== 1998 ===
1998 Indian general election: Jammu
Party	Candidate	Votes	%	±%
BJP	Vaid Vishno Dutt	336,472	43.26	
JKNC	Janak Raj Gupta	208,571	26.81	
INC	Mangat Ram Sharma	140,832	18.11	
BSP	Girdhari Lal	74,030	9.52	
IND	10 Independent Candidates	10,257	1.33	
OTH	4 Other Party Candidates	7,695	1.00	
Majority		127,901	16.45	
Turnout		789,529	54.72	
Swing to BJP from INC		Swing		

=== 1996 ===
1996 Indian general election: Jammu
Party	Candidate	Votes	%	±%
INC	Mangat Ram Sharma	194,228	34.24	
BJP	Vaid Vishno Dutt	147,495	26.00	
BSP	Abdul Rehman Sheikh	91,580	16.14	
JD	Balwan Singh	88,272	15.56	
IND	24 Independent Candidates	40,415	7.12	
OTH	2 Other Party Candidates	5,317	0.94	
Majority		46,733	8.24	
Turnout		581,314	48.18	
INC hold		Swing		

=== 1991 ===
The 1991 Indian general election was not held in Jammu and Kashmir due to severe insurgency and the breakdown of law and order that peaked between 1990 and 1991. During this period, the state was under Governor's Rule and direct Central Government administration from January 1990 to October 1996, with Lok Sabha elections resuming only in May 1996.

=== 1989 ===
1989 Indian general election: Jammu
Party	Candidate	Votes	%	±%
INC	Janak Rai Gupta	239,701	41.82	
JD	Rajinder Singh Chib	218,006	38.03	
BSP	Girdhari Lal	42,453	7.41	
BJP	Chaman Lal	35,323	6.16	
JP	Ghulam Rasool Asghar	11,049	1.93	
IND	16 Independent Candidates	26,691	4.65	
Majority		21,695	3.79	
Turnout		584,078	56.89	
INC hold		Swing		

=== 1984 ===
1984 Indian general election: Jammu
Party	Candidate	Votes	%	±%
INC	Janak Raj Gupta	262,796	46.51	
JKNC	Shabir Ahmed Salaria	142,604	25.24	
IND	Karan Singh	139,913	24.76	
IND	13 Independent Candidates	19,730	3.49	
Majority		120,192	21.27	
Turnout		576,390	71.00	
INC hold		Swing		

=== 1980 ===
1980 Indian general election: Jammu
Party	Candidate	Votes	%	±%
INC(I)	Girdhari Lal Dogra	249,760	62.46	
JP	Thakur Baldev Singh	115,503	28.88	
IND	7 Independent Candidates	34,636	8.66	
Majority		134,257	33.58	
Turnout		410,072	59.31	
Swing to INC(I) from Independent		Swing		

=== 1977 ===
1977 Indian general election: Jammu
Party	Candidate	Votes	%	±%
IND	Thakur Baldev Singh	153,837	44.60	
JKNC	Balraj Puri	125,898	36.50	
JP	Abdul Rehman	45,882	13.30	
IND	6 Independent Candidates	19,295	5.60	
Majority		27,939	8.10	
Turnout		355,660	59.18	
Swing to Independent from INC		Swing		

=== 1971 ===
1971 Indian general election: Jammu
Party	Candidate	Votes	%	±%
INC	Inderjit Malhotra	169,009	60.04	
ABJS	Abdul Rehman	84,213	29.91	
SAD	Avtar Singh	9,896	3.52	
PSP	Dhan Raj	5,332	1.89	
IND	Sagar Chand	3,125	1.11	
IND	Omprakash	2,930	1.04	
IND	Nasib Singh	2,453	0.87	
IND	Pishori Lal	2,344	0.83	
IND	Madan Singh	2,209	0.78	
Majority		84,796	30.12	
Turnout		292,392	60.48	
INC hold		Swing		

=== 1967 ===
1967 Indian general election: Jammu
Party	Candidate	Votes	%	±%
INC	I. J. Malhotra	139,036	48.42	
ABJS	A. Rehman	80,868	28.17	
JKNC	R. Singh	36,425	12.69	
DNC	K. D. Sethi	30,788	10.72	
Majority		58,168	20.25	
Turnout		297,653	67.56	
INC win (new seat)				

== See also ==
- Jammu district
- Reasi district
- Rajouri district
- Samba district
- Ladakh Lok Sabha constituency
- List of constituencies of the Lok Sabha
