= 2024 Indian general election in Jammu and Kashmir =

Election in Jammu and Kashmir, India

- 19 April - 25 May 2024

All 5 Jammu and Kashmir seats in the Lok Sabha
- Opinion polls
- Turnout: 58.46% (▲18.10%)
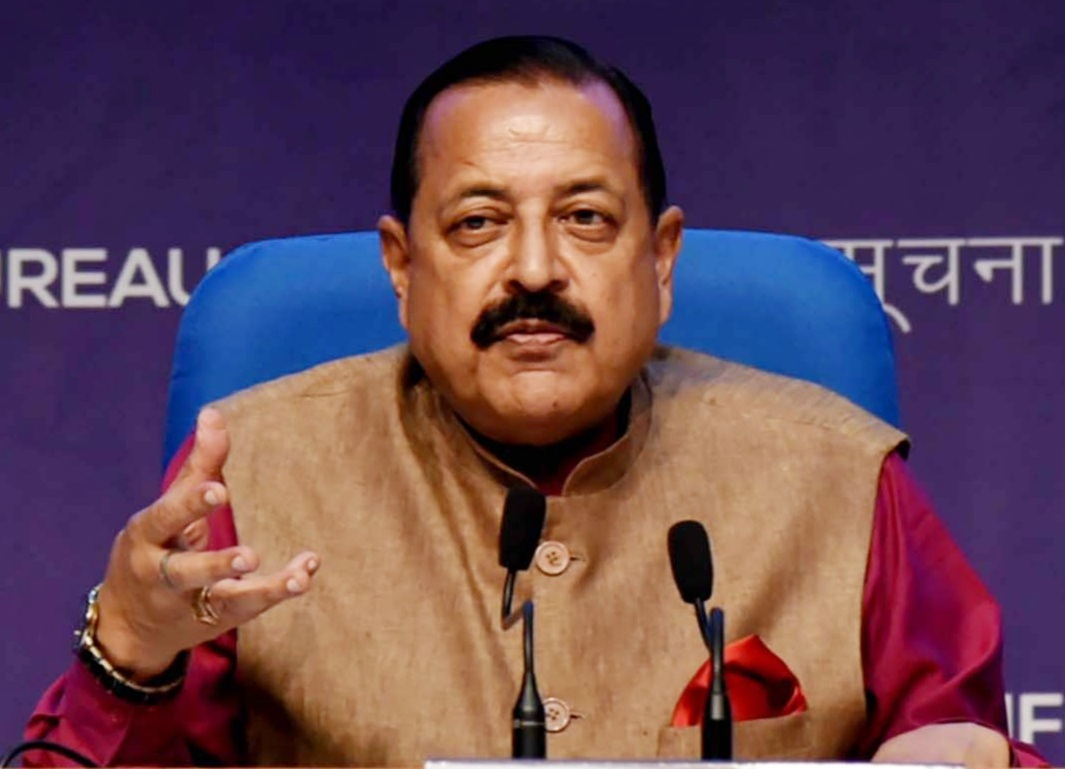

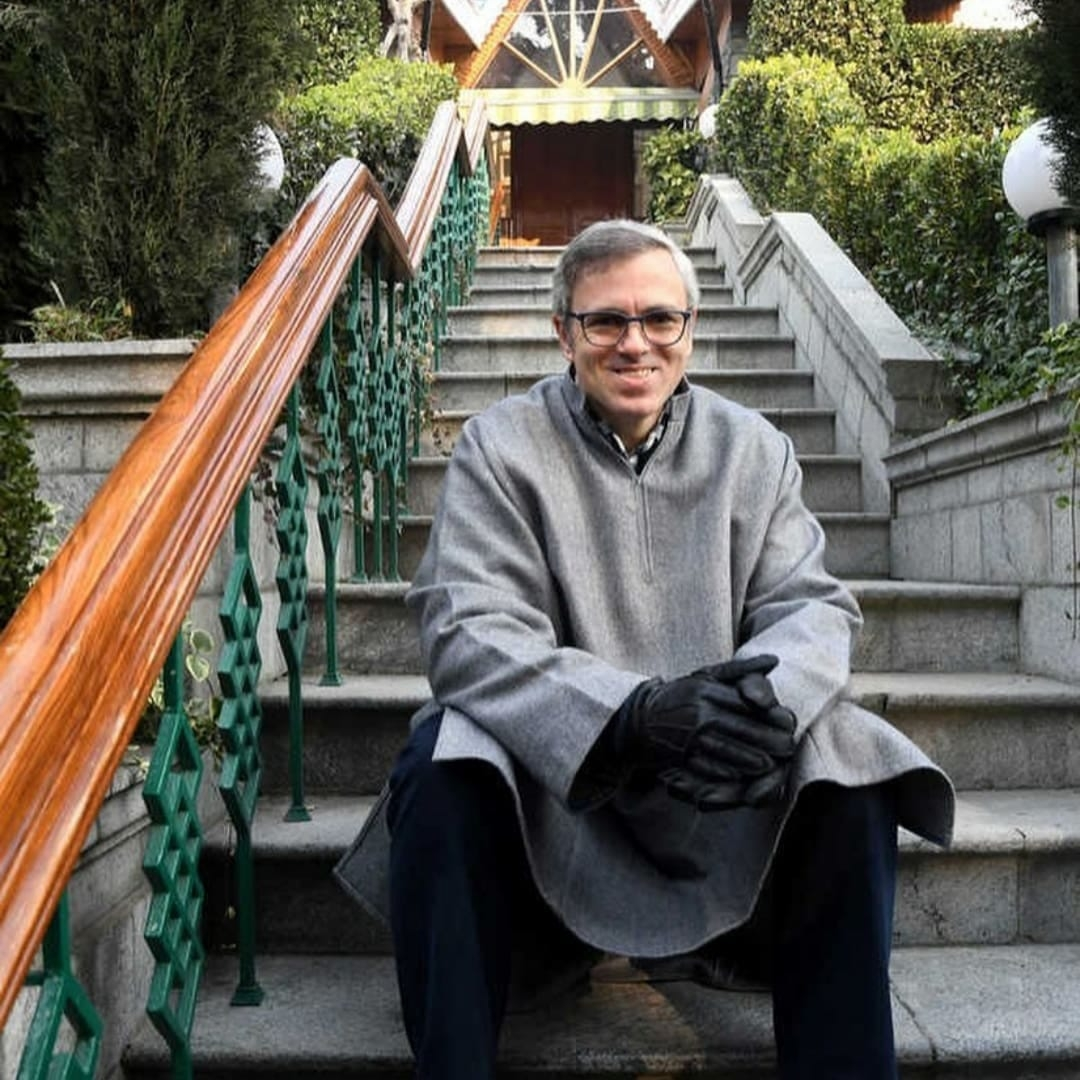

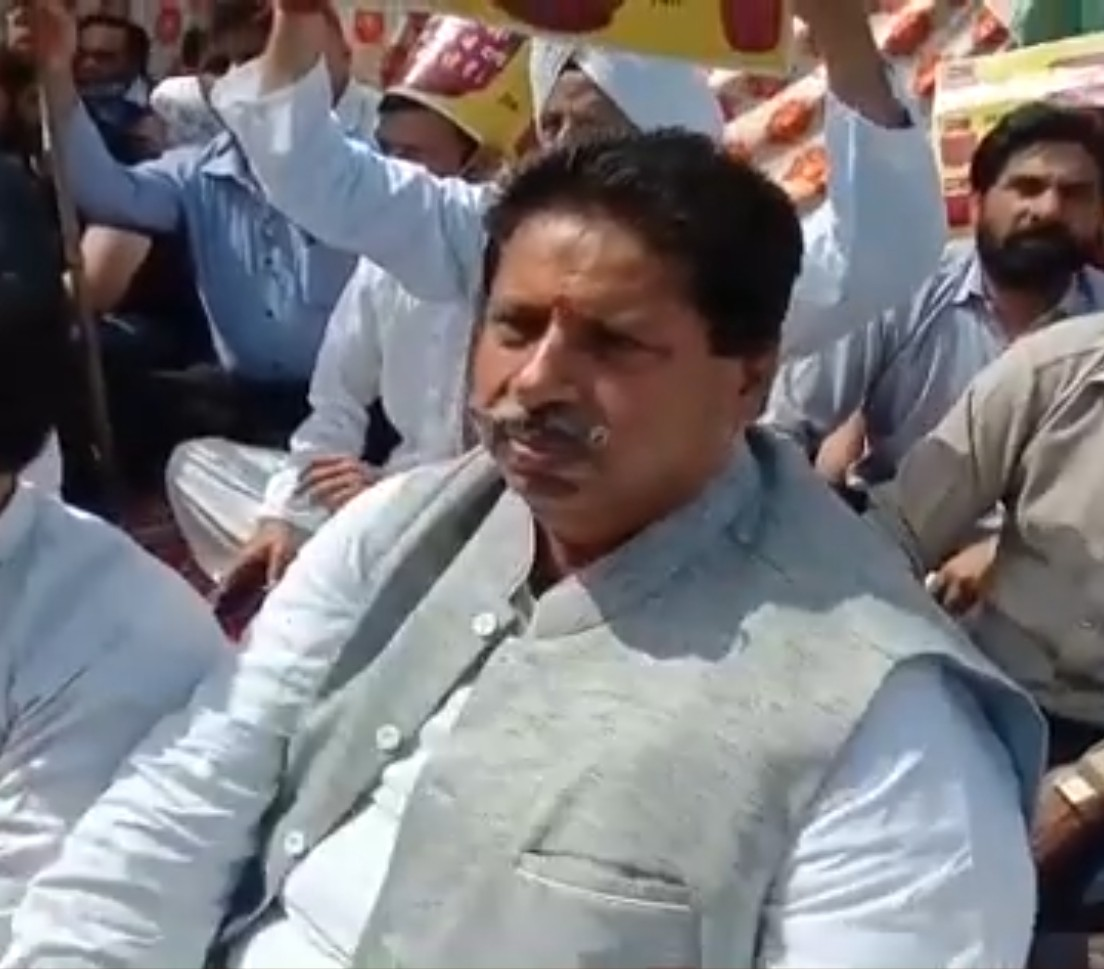

	First party	Second party
Leader	Jitendra Singh	Omar Abdullah
Party	BJP	JKNC
Alliance	NDA	INDIA
Leader since	2014	2009
Leader's seat	Udhampur (Won)	Baramulla (Lost)
Last election	2	3
Seats won	2	2
Seat change	Steady	▼1
Percentage	24.36%	22.30%
Swing	▼2.01%	▲14.43%
	Third party	Fourth party
Leader	Raman Bhalla	Mehbooba Mufti
Party	INC	JKPDP
Alliance	INDIA	INDIA (Note: Was part of INDIA bloc but did not contest under it.)
Leader since	2022	2009
Leader's seat	Jammu (Lost)	Anantnag–Rajouri (Lost)
Last election	0	0
Seats won	0	0
Seat change	Steady	Steady
Percentage	19.38%	8.48%
Swing	▼9.92%	▲4.91%
Prime Minister before election
Narendra Modi
BJP
Prime Minister after election
Narendra Modi
BJP

The 2024 Indian general election was held in Jammu and Kashmir in 5 phases from 19 April to 20 May 2024 to elect 5 members of the 18th Lok Sabha. The Bharatiya Janata Party (BJP) and Jammu and Kashmir National Conference (JKNC) won 2 seats each, with BJP winning the single largest share of the popular vote at 24.36% and JKNC coming second at 22.30%. One seat was won by an independent candidate.

== Election schedule ==
Poll event	Phase				
Poll event	I	II	III	IV	V
Notification date	20 March	28 March	12 April	18 April	26 April
Last date for filing nomination	27 March	4 April	19 April	25 April	3 May
Scrutiny of nomination	28 March	5 April	20 April	26 April	4 May
Last Date for withdrawal of nomination	30 March	8 April	22 April	29 April	6 May
Date of poll	19 April	26 April	25 May (Note: Polling in Anantnag-Rajouri constituency in J&K was rescheduled from 7 May 2024 (Phase 3) to 25 May 2024 (Phase 6) due to weather conditions.)	13 May	20 May
Date of counting of votes/Result	4 June 2024				
No. of constituencies	1	1	1	1	1

== Parties and alliances ==
=== Indian National Developmental Inclusive Alliance ===
Indian National Developmental Inclusive Alliance

2024 Lok Sabha Election Jammu and Kashmir INDIA Seat Sharing Map

Party	Flag	Symbol	Leader	Seats contested
Jammu & Kashmir National Conference			Farooq Abdullah	3
Indian National Congress			Raman Bhalla	2
Total				5

=== National Democratic Alliance ===
National Democratic Alliance

2024 Lok Sabha Election Jammu and Kashmir NDA seat distribution

Party	Flag	Symbol	Leader	Seats contested
Bharatiya Janata Party			Jitendra Singh	2
Total				2

=== Others ===
Recognised parties
Party	Flag	Symbol	Leader	Seats contested
Jammu and Kashmir People's Democratic Party			Mehbooba Mufti	3
Jammu and Kashmir National Panthers Party			Harsh Dev Singh	5
Bahujan Samaj Party				2
All India Forward Bloc				2
Total				12

Unrecognised parties
Party	Symbol	Seats contested
Jammu and Kashmir Nationalist People's Front		3
National Loktantrik Party		3
Democratic Progressive Azad Party		2
Ekam Sanatan Bharat Dal		2
Jammu and Kashmir Apni Party		2
Jammu and Kashmir People's Conference		2
National Awami United Party		2
Bharat Jodo Party		1
Gana Suraksha Party		1
Garib Democratic Party		1
Hindustan Shakti Sena		1
National Youth Party		1
Rashtriya Jankranti Party		1
Total		22

== Candidates ==
Constituency							
Constituency		INDIA				NDA	
1	Baramulla	JKNC	Omar Abdullah	JKPDP	Fayaz Ahmad Mir	DNC	
2	Srinagar	JKNC	Aga Syed Ruhullah Mehdi	JKPDP	Waheed Parra	DNC	
3	Anantnag–Rajouri	JKNC	Mian Altaf Ahmed Larvi	JKPDP	Mehbooba Mufti	DNC	
4	Udhampur	INC	Chaudhary Lal Singh	DNC		BJP	Jitendra Singh
5	Jammu	INC	Raman Bhalla	DNC		BJP	Jugal Kishore Sharma

== Surveys and polls ==
=== Opinion polls ===
Polling agency	Date published	Margin of error				Lead
Polling agency	Date published	Margin of error	INDIA	NDA	Others	Lead
ABP News-CVoter	April 2024	±3-5%	3	2	0	INDIA
Times Now-ETG	December 2023	±3%	2-3	1-3	0-1	INDIA
ABP News-CVoter	March 2024	±5%	3	2	0	INDIA
India Today-CVoter	February 2024	±3-5%	3	2	0	INDIA
Times Now-ETG	December 2023	±3%	2-3	1-3	0-1	INDIA
India TV-CNX	October 2023	±3%	2	2	1	Tie between INDIA and NDA
Times Now-ETG	September 2023	±3%	3-4	1-2	0-1	INDIA
Times Now-ETG	August 2023	±3%	2-3	1-3	0-1	INDIA

Polling agency	Date published	Margin of error				Lead
Polling agency	Date published	Margin of error	NDA	INDIA	Others	Lead
ABP News-CVoter	April 2024	±3-5%	47%	44.9%	8.1%	3.1
ABP News-CVoter	March 2024	±5%	41.4%	51.5%	7.1%	10.1
India Today-CVoter	February 2024	±3-5%	49%	36%	15%	13

=== Exit polls ===
Polling agency				Lead
Polling agency	NDA	INDIA	Others	Lead
TV9 Bharatvarsh- People's Insight - Polstrat	2	2	1	Tie
Actual results	2	2	1	Tie

== Voter turnout ==
=== Constituencies in phases ===
Constituency		Poll date	Turnout	Swing
1	Baramulla	20 May 2024	59.10%	▲24.60
2	Srinagar	13 May 2024	38.49%	▲24.06
3	Anantnag–Rajouri	25 May 2024	55.40%	New
4	Udhampur	19 April 2024	68.27%	▼2.74
5	Jammu	26 April 2024	72.22%	▼0.28
Total			58.58%	▲18.1

== Results ==
=== Results by alliance or party ===
Alliance/ Party		Popular vote			Seats		
Alliance/ Party		Votes	%	±pp	Contested	Won	+/−
INDIA	JKNC	1,139,084	22.30	▲14.09	3	2	▼1
INDIA	INC	990,182	19.38	▼9.92	2	0	Steady
INDIA	Total	2,129,266	41.68	▲4.17	5	2	▼1
INDIA	JKPDP	433,049	8.48	▲4.91	3 (Note: Was part of INDIA bloc but did not contest under it.)	0	Steady
NDA	BJP	1,244,404	24.36	▼2.01	2	2	Steady
Others					31	0	Steady
IND					59	1	▲1
NOTA		34,249	0.67	Steady			
Total			100	-	100	5	-

=== Results by constituency ===
Constituency			Winner				Runner Up				Margin	%
#	Name	Poll %	Candidate	Party	Votes	%	Candidate	Party	Votes	%	Margin	%
1	Baramulla	59.10%▲	Abdul Rashid Sheikh	IND	4,72,481	45.70%	Omar Abdullah	JKNC	2,68,339	25.95%	2,04,142	19.75%
2	Srinagar	38.49%▲	Aga Syed Ruhullah Mehdi	JKNC	3,56,866	52.85%	Waheed Para	JKPDP	1,68,450	24.95%	1,88,416	27.90%
3	Anantnag–Rajouri	55.40% ▲	Mian Altaf Ahmed Larvi	JKNC	5,21,836	50.85%	Mehbooba Mufti	JKPDP	2,40,042	23.39%	2,81,794	27.46%
4	Udhampur	68.27%▼	Jitendra Singh	BJP	5,71,076	51.28%	Chaudhary Lal Singh	INC	4,46,703	40.11%	1,24,373	11.17%
5	Jammu	72.22%▼	Jugal Kishore Sharma	BJP	6,87,588	52.80%	Raman Bhalla	INC	5,52,090	42.40%	1,35,498	10.40%

=== Strike-rate ===
Strike rate is determined by calculating the number of seats won by a party of the number of seats it contested. BJP had a 100% strike rate (It won both the seats it contested). JKNC had a 66.67% strike rate (it won 2 out of 3 seats it contested). Congress and JKPDP had a strike rate of 0% (they lost all the seats they contested).

== Assembly segments wise lead of Parties ==
Map needed

Party	Assembly segments	Position in Assembly (as of 2024 election)
Jammu & Kashmir National Conference	36	42
Bharatiya Janata Party	29	29
Indian National Congress	7	6
Jammu and Kashmir Peoples Democratic Party	5	3
Jammu and Kashmir People's Conference	1	1
Others	12	9
Total	90	
