= 2014 Indian general election in Jammu and Kashmir =

- 10, 17, 24, 30 April and 7 May 2014.

All 6 constituencies from Jammu and Kashmir to the Lok Sabha
- Turnout: 49.72% (▲10.02%)
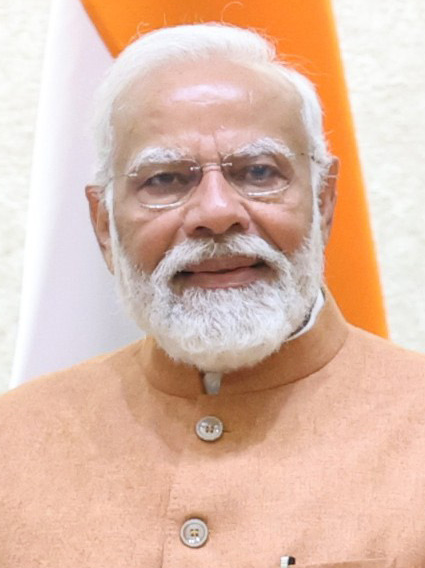

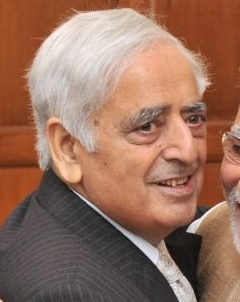

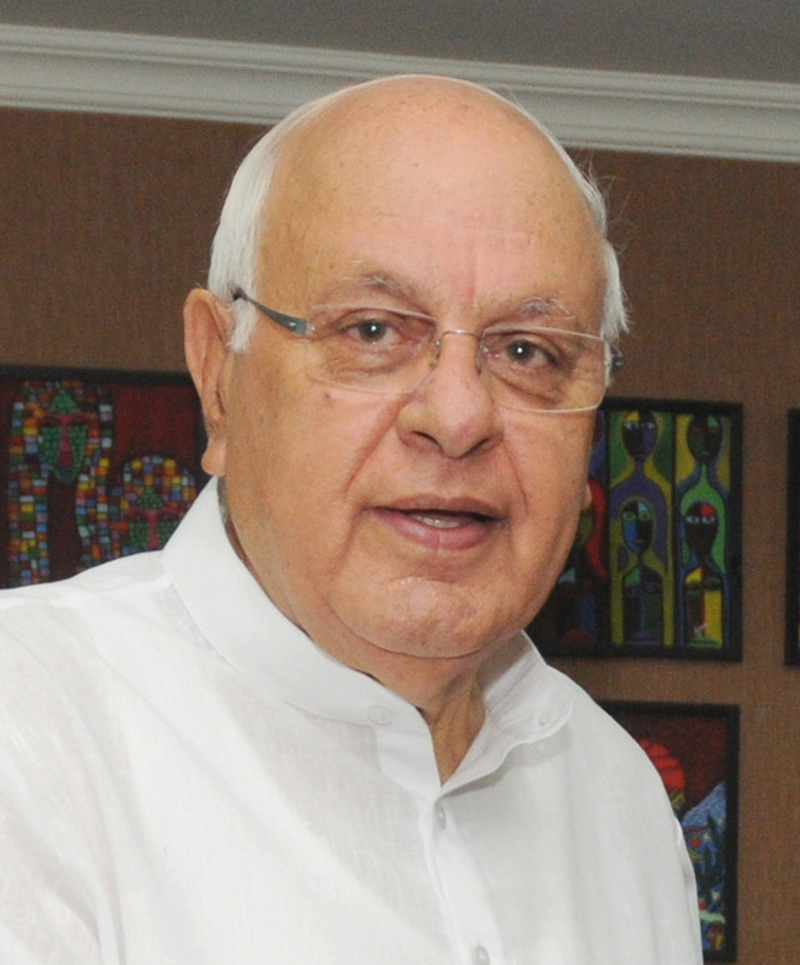
	Majority party	Minority party	Third party
Leader	Narendra Modi	Mufti Mohammad Sayeed	Farooq Abdullah
Party	BJP	JKPDP	JKNC
Alliance	NDA	None	UPA
Last election	0 seats	0 seats	3 seats
Seats won	3	3	0
Seat change	▲3	▲3	▼3
- Result of the 2014 Lok Sabha election in Jammu and Kashmir
Prime Minister before election
Manmohan Singh
INC
Prime Minister after election
Narendra Modi
BJP

The 2014 Indian general election in Jammu and Kashmir were held for 6 seats in the state. The voting process was held in five phases on 10, 17, 24, 30 April and 7 May 2014. Bharatiya Janata Party and Jammu and Kashmir People's Democratic Party won 3 seats each.

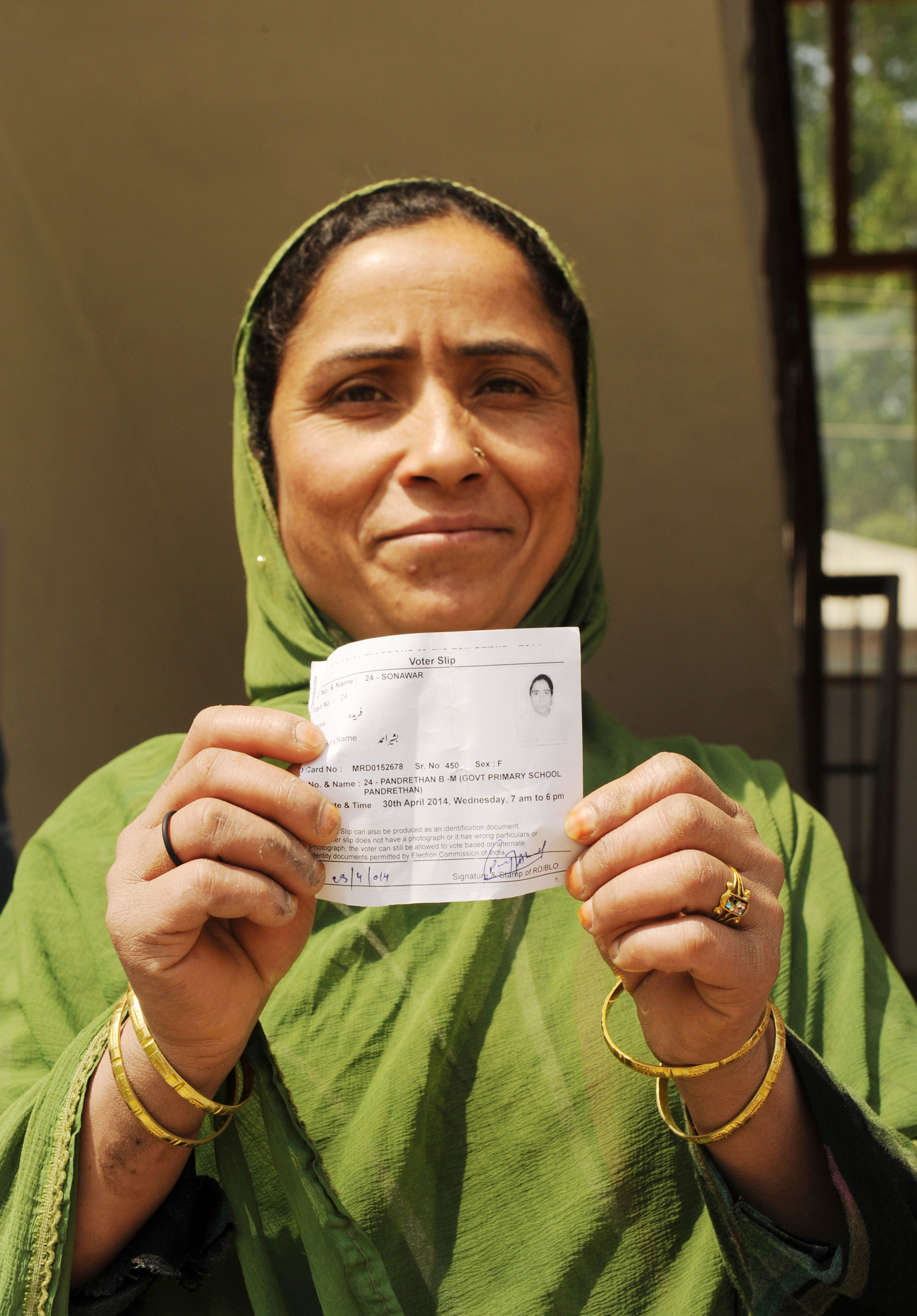
A woman voter displaying her voter slip at a polling booth during the 7th Phase of General Elections-2014 in Srinagar on April 30, 2014

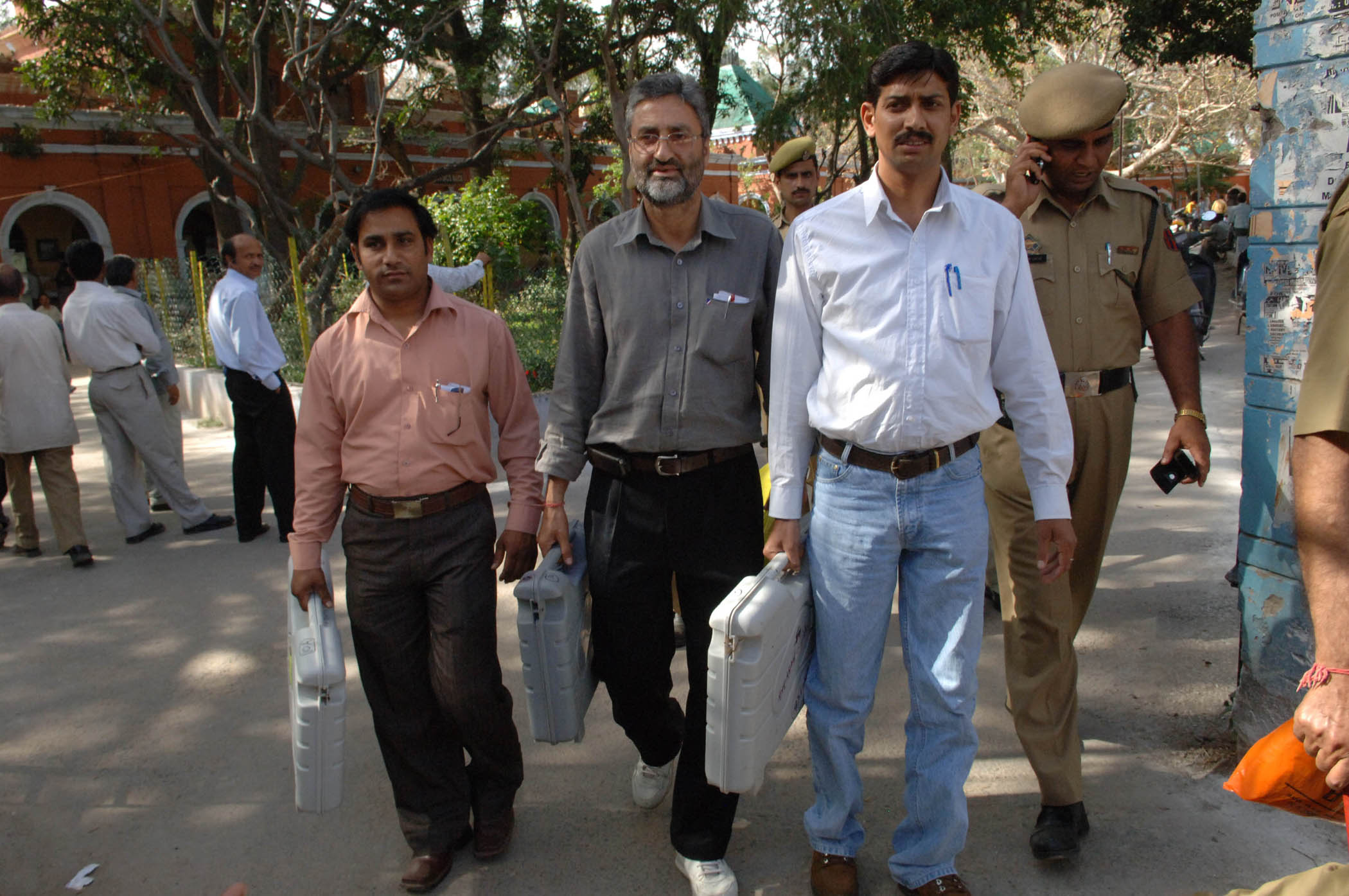
Polling officials carrying polling materials for use in the first phase of General Elections-2009 at Jammu on April 15, 2009

== Parties and alliances ==
Party/Alliance		Flag	Electoral symbol	Leader	Seats contested
Bharatiya Janata Party				Narendra Modi	6
Jammu & Kashmir Peoples Democratic Party				Mufti Mohammed Sayeed	5
UPA	Indian National Congress			Ghulam Nabi Azad	3
UPA	Jammu & Kashmir National Conference			Farooq Abdullah	3

== Result ==
Alliance/ Party		Popular vote			Seats		
Alliance/ Party		Votes	%	±pp	Contested	Won	+/−
BJP		11,54,220	32.36	▲13.75	6	3	▲3
JKPDP		7,32,644	20.54	▲0.49	5	3	▲3
UPA	INC	8,15,510	22.85	▼1.82	3	0	▼2
UPA	JKNC	3,96,713	11.12	▼7.99	3	0	▼3
UPA	Total	12,12,223	33.99	▼9.79	6	0	▼5
Others		2,12,728	5.96	Steady	28	0	Steady
IND		2,23,498	6.27	▼0.01	33	0	▼1
NOTA		31,550	0.88	Steady			
Total		35,66,863	100%	-	78	6	-

== List of Candidates ==
Constituency		BJP		UPA		JKPDP	
No.	Name	Party	Candidate	Party	Candidate	Party	Candidate
1	Baramulla	BJP	Gulam Mohammad Mir	JKNC	Sharifuddin Shariq	JKPDP	Muzaffar Hussain Baig
2	Srinagar	BJP	Fayaz Ahmad Bhat	JKNC	Farooq Abdullah	JKPDP	Tariq Hameed Karra
3	Anantnag	BJP	Mushtaq Ahmad Malik	JKNC	Mirza Mehboob Beg	JKPDP	Mehbooba Mufti
4	Ladakh	BJP	Thupstan Chhewang	INC	Tsering Samphel	Did not contest	
5	Udhampur	BJP	Jitendra Singh Rana	INC	Ghulam Nabi Azad	JKPDP	Mohd. Arshad Malik
6	Jammu	BJP	Jugal Kishore Sharma	INC	Madan Lal Sharma	JKPDP	Yashpal Sharma

== List of elected MPs ==
Keys: BJP (3) JKPDP (3)

Constituency		Winner				Runner-up				Margin	
Constituency		Candidate	Party	Votes	%	Candidate	Party	Votes	%	Votes	%
1	Baramulla	Muzaffar Hussain Baig	JKPDP	175,277	37.61	Sharifuddin Shariq	JKNC	146,058	31.34	29,219	6.27
2	Srinagar	Tariq Hameed Karra	JKPDP	157,923	50.58	Farooq Abdullah	JKNC	115,643	37.04	42,280	13.54
3	Anantnag	Mehbooba Mufti	JKPDP	200,429	53.41	Mirza Mehboob Beg	JKNC	135,012	35.98	65,417	17.43
4	Ladakh	Thupstan Chhewang	BJP	31,111	26.13	Ghulam Raza	IND	31,075	26.10	36	0.03
5	Udhampur	Jitendra Singh Rana	BJP	487,369	46.76	Ghulam Nabi Azad	INC	426,393	40.91	60,976	5.85
6	Jammu	Jugal Kishore Sharma	BJP	619,995	49.34	Madan Lal Sharma	INC	362,715	28.87	257,280	20.47

== Post-election Union Council of Ministers from Jammu and Kashmir ==
#	Name	Constituency	Designation	Department	From	To	Party
1	Jitendra Singh	Udhampur (Lok Sabha)	MoS (I/C); MoS	MoS (I/C): Science and Technology; Earth Sciences (until 9 Nov 2014); Development of North Eastern Region (from 9 Nov 2014); Youth Affairs and Sports (22 May 2016–5 July 2016); MoS: Prime Minister's Office; Personnel, Public Grievances and Pensions; Atomic Energy; Space	27 May 2014	30 May 2019	BJP

== Assembly segments wise lead of Parties ==
Party	Assembly segments	Position in Assembly (as of 2014 election)
Jammu and Kashmir Peoples Democratic Party	41	28
Bharatiya Janata Party	25	25
Indian National Congress	12	12
Jammu & Kashmir National Conference	5	15
Jammu and Kashmir People's Conference	1	2
Others	3	4
Total	87	

== Bye-elections ==
Constituency			Winner				Runner Up				Margin
No.	Name	Date	Candidate	Party	Votes	%	Candidate	Party	Votes	%	Margin
2	Srinagar	15 April 2017	Farooq Abdullah	JKNC	48,555	54.02	Nazir Ahmad Khan	JKPDP	37,779	42.03	10,776
2	Srinagar	15 April 2017	The 2017 Srinagar Lok Sabha by-poll was held because the sitting Member of Parliament, Tariq Hameed Karra, resigned from his seat.								

== See also ==
- Elections in Jammu and Kashmir
