= Gandhinagar, Jammu and Kashmir Assembly constituency =

Constituency of the Jammu and Kashmir legislative assembly

Coordinates: 32.704°N 74.861°E

Gandhinagar
- Former constituency for the Jammu and Kashmir Legislative Assembly

Constituency details
- Country: India
- State: Jammu and Kashmir
- District: Jammu
- Established: 1996
- Abolished: 2018

Gandhinagar was a legislative constituency in the Jammu and Kashmir Legislative Assembly of Jammu and Kashmir. It is one of the most posh areas of the Union Territory of Jammu and Kashmir. The area is well known for its facilities in the Union Territory. Gandhinagar was also part of Jammu Lok Sabha constituency.

== Member of Legislative Assembly ==
Year	Member	Party
1996	Choudhary Piara Singh	Bharatiya Janata Party
2002	Raman Bhalla	Indian National Congress
2008	Raman Bhalla	Indian National Congress
2014	Kavinder Gupta	Bharatiya Janata Party

== Election results ==
=== Assembly Election 2014 ===
2014 Jammu and Kashmir Legislative Assembly election : Gandhinagar
Party	Candidate	Votes	%	±%
BJP	Kavinder Gupta	56,679	51.17%	▲17.28
INC	Raman Bhalla	39,902	36.02%	▼0.32
JKPDP	Amrik Singh	9,815	8.86%	▲8.23
JKNC	Surinder Singh Bunty	1,099	0.99%	▼19.56
BSP	Ravinder Singh Pappu	1,080	0.98%	▼3.71
NOTA	None of the Above	523	0.47%	New
Margin of victory		16,777	15.15%	▲12.69
Turnout		1,10,762	65.28%	▲1.13
Registered electors		1,69,672		▲18.13
BJP gain from INC		Swing	▲14.83	

=== Assembly Election 2008 ===
2008 Jammu and Kashmir Legislative Assembly election : Gandhinagar
Party	Candidate	Votes	%	±%
INC	Raman Bhalla	33,486	36.34%	▼13.47
BJP	Nirmal Singh	31,223	33.89%	▲28.91
JKNC	Trilochan Singh Wazir	18,935	20.55%	▼15.14
BSP	Shamsher Singh	4,319	4.69%	▲1.90
Independent	Ashok Kumar Basotra	646	0.70%	New
JKPDP	Surjeet Kour	585	0.63%	New
Margin of victory		2,263	2.46%	▼11.67
Turnout		92,138	64.15%	▲15.69
Registered electors		1,43,629		▼6.33
INC hold		Swing	▼13.47	

=== Assembly Election 2002 ===
2002 Jammu and Kashmir Legislative Assembly election : Gandhinagar
Party	Candidate	Votes	%	±%
INC	Raman Bhalla	37,010	49.81%	▲35.44
JKNC	Harbans Singh	26,517	35.69%	▲3.10
BJP	Charanjit Singh	3,700	4.98%	▼32.62
Independent	Onkar Seth	2,436	3.28%	New
BSP	Pritam Chand	2,070	2.79%	▼5.78
NCP	Hussain Ali	595	0.80%	New
Margin of victory		10,493	14.12%	▲9.11
Turnout		74,299	48.46%	▼1.35
Registered electors		1,53,334		▲45.21
INC gain from BJP		Swing	▲12.21	

=== Assembly Election 1996 ===
1996 Jammu and Kashmir Legislative Assembly election : Gandhinagar
Party	Candidate	Votes	%	±%
BJP	Choudhary Piara Singh	19,779	37.60%	New
JKNC	Harbans Singh	17,142	32.59%	New
INC	Rangil Singh	7,560	14.37%	New
BSP	Ram Parkash Sharma	4,506	8.57%	New
JD	Narinder Singh Raina	2,200	4.18%	New
AIIC(T)	Narinder Singh Raina	632	1.20%	New
Margin of victory		2,637	5.01%	
Turnout		52,599	50.55%	
Registered electors		1,05,598		
BJP win (new seat)				
