= Reasi Assembly constituency =

Constituency of the Jammu and Kashmir legislative assembly in India

Coordinates: 33.08°N 74.84°E

Reasi
- Constituency No. 57 for the Jammu and Kashmir Legislative Assembly

Constituency details
- Country: India
- State: Jammu and Kashmir
- District: Reasi
- Lok Sabha constituency: Jammu
- Established: 1962
- Reservation: None

Member of Legislative Assembly
- Incumbent Kuldeep Raj Dubey
- Party: BJP
- Alliance: NDA
- Elected year: 2024

Reasi Assembly constituency is one of the 90 constituencies in the Jammu and Kashmir Legislative Assembly of Jammu and Kashmir a north state of India. It is also part of Jammu Lok Sabha constituency.

== Members of the Legislative Assembly ==
Election	Member	Party
1962	Rishi Kumar Kaushal	Jammu Praja Parishad
1967	Bansi Lal Kohistani	Indian National Congress
1972	Rishi Kumar Kaushal	Bharatiya Jana Sangh
1977	Rishi Kumar Kaushal	Janata Party
1983	Jagjivan Lal	Jammu & Kashmir National Conference
1987	Mohammed Ayub Khan	Indian National Congress
1996	Jagjiven Lal	Janata Dal
2002	Jugal Kishore	Indian National Congress
2008	Baldev Raj	Bharatiya Janata Party
2014	Ajay Nanda	Bharatiya Janata Party
2024	Kuldeep Raj Dubey	Bharatiya Janata Party

== Election results ==
=== Assembly Election 2024 ===
2024 Jammu and Kashmir Legislative Assembly election : Reasi
Party	Candidate	Votes	%	±%
BJP	Kuldeep Raj Dubey	39,647	63.51%	▲38.25
INC	Mumtaz Ahmed	20,832	33.37%	▲11.65
Independent	Arjun Singh	501	0.80%	New
NOTA	None of the Above	414	0.66%	▼0.02
Margin of victory		18,815	30.14%	▲27.97
Turnout		62,430	73.55%	▼6.76
Registered electors		84,877		▼21.80
BJP hold		Swing	▲38.25	

=== Assembly Election 2014 ===
2014 Jammu and Kashmir Legislative Assembly election : Reasi
Party	Candidate	Votes	%	±%
BJP	Ajay Nanda	22,017	25.26%	▼11.75
Independent	Saraf Singh	20,130	23.09%	New
INC	Jugal Kishore	18,929	21.71%	▼5.82
Independent	Karnail Singh	10,256	11.77%	New
JKNC	Jagjiwan Lal	9,457	10.85%	▼11.41
Independent	Baldev Raj Sharma	2,061	2.36%	New
BSP	Karan Singh	1,048	1.20%	New
NOTA	None of the Above	597	0.68%	New
Margin of victory		1,887	2.16%	▼7.31
Turnout		87,171	80.32%	▲6.71
Registered electors		1,08,535		▲13.59
BJP hold		Swing	▼11.75	

=== Assembly Election 2008 ===
2008 Jammu and Kashmir Legislative Assembly election : Reasi
Party	Candidate	Votes	%	±%
BJP	Baldev Raj	26,031	37.01%	▲3.34
INC	Jugal Kishore	19,369	27.54%	▼9.43
JKNC	Jagjeevan Lal	15,653	22.25%	▼1.46
Independent	Bhupinder Singh	2,788	3.96%	New
JKNPP	Sardhari Lal Dubey	1,503	2.14%	▲0.26
Independent	Meenakshi Sharma	710	1.01%	New
Independent	Vijay Kumar Sharma	693	0.99%	New
Margin of victory		6,662	9.47%	▲6.17
Turnout		70,336	73.61%	▲11.41
Registered electors		95,553		▼4.66
BJP gain from INC		Swing	▲0.04	

=== Assembly Election 2002 ===
2002 Jammu and Kashmir Legislative Assembly election : Reasi
Party	Candidate	Votes	%	±%
INC	Jugal Kishore	23,045	36.97%	▲26.56
BJP	Baldev Raj	20,989	33.67%	▲17.15
JKNC	Jagjiwan Lal	14,781	23.71%	▲14.73
JKNPP	Dr. Vakil Singh	1,172	1.88%	New
Independent	Davinder Singh	511	0.82%	New
Independent	Kushal Kumar	458	0.73%	New
JKPDP	Bansi Lal Thakur	380	0.61%	New
Margin of victory		2,056	3.30%	▼8.15
Turnout		62,333	62.20%	▲1.89
Registered electors		1,00,222		▲41.18
INC gain from JD		Swing	▲9.00	

=== Assembly Election 1996 ===
1996 Jammu and Kashmir Legislative Assembly election : Reasi
Party	Candidate	Votes	%	±%
JD	Jagjiven Lal	11,974	27.97%	New
BJP	Baldev Raj	7,072	16.52%	▲3.29
Independent	Gandharb Singh	6,140	14.34%	New
Independent	Jugal Kishore	5,873	13.72%	New
INC	Sardari Lal	4,459	10.42%	▼36.58
JKNC	Des Raj	3,846	8.98%	New
Independent	Kuldeep Kumar	858	2.00%	New
Margin of victory		4,902	11.45%	▼18.13
Turnout		42,812	61.24%	▼5.13
Registered electors		70,987		▲40.44
JD gain from INC		Swing	▼19.03	

=== Assembly Election 1987 ===
1987 Jammu and Kashmir Legislative Assembly election : Reasi
Party	Candidate	Votes	%	±%
INC	Mohammed Ayub Khan	15,545	46.99%	▲19.14
Independent	Jagjiwan Lal	5,762	17.42%	New
JKNPP	Bhim Singh	5,534	16.73%	New
BJP	Madhav Lal	4,377	13.23%	▼6.21
CPI(M)	Om Parkash	716	2.16%	New
Independent	Ashwani Kumar	520	1.57%	New
Independent	Jagpaul Sharma	382	1.15%	New
Margin of victory		9,783	29.58%	▲24.57
Turnout		33,078	66.58%	▲7.15
Registered electors		50,545		▲22.64
INC gain from JKNC		Swing	▲14.14	

=== Assembly Election 1983 ===
1983 Jammu and Kashmir Legislative Assembly election : Reasi
Party	Candidate	Votes	%	±%
JKNC	Jagjivan Lal	7,895	32.86%	▲18.50
INC	Rajit Singh	6,693	27.86%	▲15.36
BJP	Rishi Kumar Kaushal	4,671	19.44%	New
Independent	Bhim Singh	4,457	18.55%	New
Independent	Partap Singh	196	0.82%	New
Margin of victory		1,202	5.00%	▼33.48
Turnout		24,027	59.43%	▲4.33
Registered electors		41,215		▲18.34
JKNC gain from JP		Swing	▼19.98	

=== Assembly Election 1977 ===
1977 Jammu and Kashmir Legislative Assembly election : Reasi
Party	Candidate	Votes	%	±%
JP	Rishi Kumar Kaushal	9,931	52.84%	New
JKNC	Raghunath Das	2,699	14.36%	New
Independent	Ranjit Singh	2,583	13.74%	New
INC	Bansi Lal Kohistani	2,349	12.50%	▼29.55
Independent	Hai Singh	641	3.41%	New
Independent	Rishpal Singh	256	1.36%	New
Independent	Kidar Nath Sapolia	199	1.06%	New
Margin of victory		7,232	38.48%	▲25.79
Turnout		18,794	54.70%	▼14.32
Registered electors		34,828		▲24.21
JP gain from ABJS		Swing	▼1.90	

=== Assembly Election 1972 ===
1972 Jammu and Kashmir Legislative Assembly election : Reasi
Party	Candidate	Votes	%	±%
ABJS	Rishi Kumar Kaushal	10,480	54.74%	▲8.75
INC	L. D. Thakar	8,050	42.05%	▼6.35
Independent	Raghunath Dass	615	3.21%	New
Margin of victory		2,430	12.69%	▲10.29
Turnout		19,145	70.83%	▲1.39
Registered electors		28,040		▲7.83
ABJS gain from INC		Swing		

=== Assembly Election 1967 ===
1967 Jammu and Kashmir Legislative Assembly election : Reasi
Party	Candidate	Votes	%	±%
INC	Bansi Lal Kohistani	8,417	48.40%	New
ABJS	R. K. Kaushal	7,999	45.99%	New
JKNC	B. L. Suri	976	5.61%	▼38.57
Margin of victory		418	2.40%	▲1.13
Turnout		17,392	69.27%	▼2.36
Registered electors		26,003		▼7.43
INC gain from JPP		Swing	▲2.94	

=== Assembly Election 1962 ===
1962 Jammu and Kashmir Legislative Assembly election : Reasi
Party	Candidate	Votes	%	±%
JPP	Rishi Kumar Kaushal	8,842	45.46%	New
JKNC	Rikhi Kesh	8,595	44.19%	New
Harijan Mandal	Makhan Lal	635	3.26%	New
Independent	Munshi Ram	511	2.63%	New
Independent	Krishan Singh	510	2.62%	New
Independent	Behari Lal	359	1.85%	New
Margin of victory		247	1.27%	
Turnout		19,452	72.01%	
Registered electors		28,090		
JPP win (new seat)				

== See also ==
- Reasi
- Reasi district
- List of constituencies of Jammu and Kashmir Legislative Assembly
