= Jugal Kishore Sharma =

Indian politician

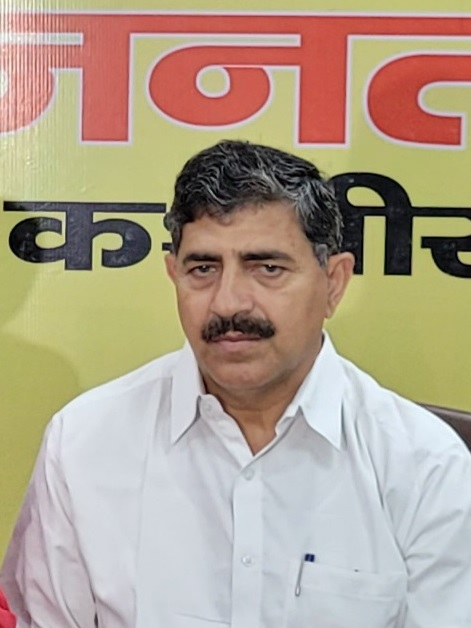
- Jugal Kishore Sharma at a press conference at BJP Office, Jammu.

Member of parliament, Lok Sabha
- Incumbent
- Assumed office 26 May 2014
- Preceded by: Madan Lal Sharma
- Constituency: Jammu

Personal details
- Born: 5 December 1962 (age 63) Jammu, Jammu and Kashmir, India
- Party: BJP
- Spouse: Usha Devi
- Children: 2
- Profession: Agriculturist, Politician
- As of 15 December, 2016

Jugal Kishore Sharma (born 5 December 1962) is an Indian politician. He is a member of Lower House of Parliament (Lok Sabha) following the 2014 Indian general election in Jammu and Kashmir, being elected from Jammu constituency for three consecutive times as a candidate of Bharatiya Janata Party. He has been re-elected as a member of Lower House of Parliament in the 2019 Indian general election in Jammu and Kashmir and 2024 Indian general election in Jammu and Kashmir from Jammu constituency as a member of the Bharatiya Janata Party. He is a Rashtriya Swayamsevak Sangh worker. MLA first time in 2002 from Nagrota constituency again 2nd time in 2008 from Nagrota constituency, MP from jammu lok Sabha 3 times -2014,2019,2024(2 Time MLA & 3 Time MP), Former State president of BJP jammu £ Kashmir Unit.

== Electoral performance ==
Election	Constituency	Party	Result	Votes %	Opposition Candidate	Opposition Party	Opposition vote %	Ref
2024	Jammu	BJP	Won	53.46%	Raman Bhalla	INC	42.93%	
2019	Jammu	BJP	Won	58.02%	Raman Bhalla	INC	37.54%	
2014	Jammu	BJP	Won	49.34%	Madan Lal Sharma	INC	28.87%	
2008	Nagrota, Jammu and Kashmir	BJP	Won	22.76%	M. K. Ajat Shatru	JKNC	19.45%	
2002	Nagrota, Jammu and Kashmir	BJP	Won	26.82%	Ajatshatru Singh	JKNC	26.65%	
