= Marh Assembly constituency =

Constituency of the Jammu and Kashmir legislative assembly in India

Coordinates: 32.90°N 74.84°E

Marh
- Constituency No. 80 for the Jammu and Kashmir Legislative Assembly

Constituency details
- Country: India
- State: Jammu and Kashmir
- District: Jammu
- Lok Sabha constituency: Jammu
- Established: 1962
- Total electors: 93,300
- Reservation: SC

Member of Legislative Assembly
- Incumbent Surinder Kumar
- Party: BJP
- Alliance: NDA
- Elected year: 2024

Marh Assembly constituency is one of the 90 constituencies in the Jammu and Kashmir Legislative Assembly of Jammu and Kashmir a north state of India. Marh is also part of Jammu Lok Sabha constituency.

== Members of the Legislative Assembly ==
Election	Member	Party
1962	Guranditta Mal	Jammu & Kashmir National Conference
1967	Guranditta Mal	Indian National Congress
1972	Sushil Kumar	Indian National Congress
1977	Tulsi Ram	Janata Party
1983	Mula Ram	Indian National Congress
1987	Mula Ram	Indian National Congress
1996	Ajay Sadhotra	Jammu & Kashmir National Conference
2002	Ajay Sadhotra	Jammu & Kashmir National Conference
2008	Sukh Nandan Kumar	Bharatiya Janata Party
2014	Sukh Nandan Kumar	Bharatiya Janata Party
2024	Surinder Kumar	Bharatiya Janata Party

== Election results ==
=== Assembly Election 2024 ===
2024 Jammu and Kashmir Legislative Assembly election : Marh
Party	Candidate	Votes	%	±%
BJP	Surinder Kumar	42,563	55.25%	▲12.90
INC	Mula Ram	19,477	25.28%	▲6.51
Independent	Mohan Lal Kaith	12,868	16.70%	New
ASP(KR)	Som Nath	802	1.04%	New
BSP	Jagdish Chander	496	0.64%	▼4.31
NOTA	None of the Above	411	0.53%	▼0.32
Margin of victory		23,086	29.97%	▲10.60
Turnout		77,039	82.57%	▲0.99
Registered electors		93,300		▲26.93
BJP hold		Swing	▲12.90	

=== Assembly Election 2014 ===
2014 Jammu and Kashmir Legislative Assembly election : Marh
Party	Candidate	Votes	%	±%
BJP	Sukh Nandan Kumar	25,396	42.35%	▲7.31
JKNC	Ajay Sadhotra	13,784	22.99%	▲0.50
INC	Balwan Singh	11,255	18.77%	▲16.87
JKPDP	Suram Singh	4,886	8.15%	▲2.69
BSP	Ashok Kumar	2,972	4.96%	▼5.71
NCP	Sandeep Singh	448	0.75%	New
NOTA	None of the Above	514	0.86%	New
Margin of victory		11,612	19.36%	▲6.81
Turnout		59,965	81.58%	▼0.39
Registered electors		73,503		▲14.95
BJP hold		Swing	▲7.31	

=== Assembly Election 2008 ===
2008 Jammu and Kashmir Legislative Assembly election : Marh
Party	Candidate	Votes	%	±%
BJP	Sukh Nandan Kumar	18,368	35.04%	▲5.66
JKNC	Ajay Sadhotra	11,787	22.49%	▼9.38
Independent	Balwan Singh	9,207	17.56%	New
BSP	Jagjit Singh	5,592	10.67%	▲5.86
JKPDP	Suram Singh	2,863	5.46%	New
INC	Dharam Pal Sharma	993	1.89%	▼27.01
Independent	Anan Sharma	950	1.81%	New
Margin of victory		6,581	12.56%	▲10.07
Turnout		52,417	81.97%	▲13.15
Registered electors		63,943		▼6.23
BJP gain from JKNC		Swing	▲3.17	

=== Assembly Election 2002 ===
2002 Jammu and Kashmir Legislative Assembly election : Marh
Party	Candidate	Votes	%	±%
JKNC	Ajay Sadhotra	14,959	31.87%	▲2.12
BJP	Sukh Nandan Kumar	13,792	29.39%	▲2.03
INC	Balwan Singh	13,564	28.90%	▲15.81
BSP	Ashok Kumar	2,255	4.80%	▼10.44
JKNPP	Parshotam Singh	617	1.31%	New
Independent	Yash Raj Singh	579	1.23%	New
Margin of victory		1,167	2.49%	▲0.08
Turnout		46,935	68.83%	▼0.69
Registered electors		68,194		▲40.04
JKNC hold		Swing	▲2.12	

=== Assembly Election 1996 ===
1996 Jammu and Kashmir Legislative Assembly election : Marh
Party	Candidate	Votes	%	±%
JKNC	Ajay Sadhotra	10,072	29.75%	New
BJP	Sukh Nandan Kumar	9,259	27.35%	▲24.66
BSP	Girdhari Lal	5,160	15.24%	New
INC	Balwan Singh	4,432	13.09%	▼39.14
Independent	Devi Dass	2,090	6.17%	New
JD	Madan Mohan Khajooria	1,050	3.10%	New
CPI(M)	Parminder Singh	950	2.81%	New
Margin of victory		813	2.40%	▼13.86
Turnout		33,850	70.68%	▼7.02
Registered electors		48,697		▲13.44
JKNC gain from INC		Swing	▼22.48	

=== Assembly Election 1987 ===
1987 Jammu and Kashmir Legislative Assembly election : Marh
Party	Candidate	Votes	%	±%
INC	Mula Ram	17,162	52.24%	▼5.78
JKNPP	Sat Pal	11,818	35.97%	New
Independent	Banarsi Lal	1,645	5.01%	New
CPI	Dewan Chand	1,230	3.74%	▼1.46
BJP	Krishan Lal	884	2.69%	▼1.35
Margin of victory		5,344	16.27%	▼28.61
Turnout		32,854	78.50%	▲9.11
Registered electors		42,929		▲15.47
INC hold		Swing	▼5.78	

=== Assembly Election 1983 ===
1983 Jammu and Kashmir Legislative Assembly election : Marh
Party	Candidate	Votes	%	±%
INC	Mula Ram	14,543	58.02%	▲30.87
Independent	Krit Paul	3,295	13.15%	New
JKNC	Tilak Raj Atri	3,128	12.48%	▼12.30
CPI	Sham Lal	1,304	5.20%	▲1.79
BJP	Vishwa Bandhu	1,013	4.04%	New
Independent	Pritam Chand Motan	561	2.24%	New
Independent	Milkhi Ram	373	1.49%	New
Margin of victory		11,248	44.88%	▲39.07
Turnout		25,065	69.07%	▲13.99
Registered electors		37,179		▲18.43
INC gain from JP		Swing	▲25.07	

=== Assembly Election 1977 ===
1977 Jammu and Kashmir Legislative Assembly election : Marh
Party	Candidate	Votes	%	±%
JP	Tulsi Ram	5,527	32.96%	New
INC	Sushil Kumar	4,553	27.15%	▼24.29
JKNC	Milkhi Ram	4,155	24.77%	New
Independent	Vishwa Bandu	944	5.63%	New
CPI	Dhoonda	573	3.42%	New
Independent	Mela Singh	557	3.32%	New
Independent	Som Nath Dogra	462	2.75%	New
Margin of victory		974	5.81%	▼16.45
Turnout		16,771	54.60%	▼12.43
Registered electors		31,393		▲43.59
JP gain from INC		Swing	▼18.49	

=== Assembly Election 1972 ===
1972 Jammu and Kashmir Legislative Assembly election : Marh
Party	Candidate	Votes	%	±%
INC	Sushil Kumar	7,406	51.44%	▲10.57
ABJS	Tulsi Ram	4,201	29.18%	▼3.84
Independent	Milkhi Ram	2,790	19.38%	New
Margin of victory		3,205	22.26%	▲14.41
Turnout		14,397	68.01%	▼5.69
Registered electors		21,863		▲18.53
INC hold		Swing		

=== Assembly Election 1967 ===
1967 Jammu and Kashmir Legislative Assembly election : Marh
Party	Candidate	Votes	%	±%
INC	Guranditta Mal	5,393	40.87%	New
ABJS	N. Mal	4,357	33.02%	New
JKNC	M. Ram	2,953	22.38%	▼19.11
Democratic National Conference	D. Nath	493	3.74%	▲0.20
Margin of victory		1,036	7.85%	▼3.85
Turnout		13,196	74.87%	▼2.87
Registered electors		18,445		▲9.52
INC gain from JKNC		Swing	▼0.62	

=== Assembly Election 1962 ===
1962 Jammu and Kashmir Legislative Assembly election : Marh
Party	Candidate	Votes	%	±%
JKNC	Guranditta Mal	5,200	41.49%	New
JPP	Ram Rakha Mal	3,734	29.79%	New
Harijan Mandal	Milkhi Ram	2,877	22.96%	New
Democratic National Conference	Behari Lal	443	3.53%	New
Independent	Ram Saran	279	2.23%	New
Margin of victory		1,466	11.70%	
Turnout		12,533	75.58%	
Registered electors		16,842		
JKNC win (new seat)				

== See also ==
- Jammu
- List of constituencies of Jammu and Kashmir Legislative Assembly
