= Bahu Assembly constituency =

Constituency of the Jammu and Kashmir legislative assembly in India

Bahu
- Constituency No. 75 for the Jammu and Kashmir Legislative Assembly

Constituency details
- Country: India
- State: Jammu and Kashmir
- District: Jammu
- Lok Sabha constituency: Jammu
- Established: 2022

Member of Legislative Assembly
- Incumbent Vikram Randhawa
- Party: BJP
- Alliance: NDA
- Elected year: 2024

Bahu Assembly constituency is one of the 90 constituencies in the Jammu and Kashmir Legislative Assembly of Jammu and Kashmir a north state of India. Bahu is also part of Jammu Lok Sabha constituency.

== Members of Legislative Assembly ==
Year	Member	Party
2024	Vikram Randhawa	Bharatiya Janata Party

== Election results ==
=== Assembly Election 2024 ===
2024 Jammu and Kashmir Legislative Assembly election: Bahu
Party	Candidate	Votes	%	±%
BJP	Vikram Randhawa	40,385	55.34	
INC	Taranjit Singh Tony	29,134	39.92	
JKPDP	Varinder Singh	918	1.26	
BSP	Pushp Shabalya	869	1.19	
NOTA	None of the Above	460	0.63	
DPAP	Sobat Ali	362	0.5	
Independent	Jayesh Kumar	160	0.22	
Independent	Kulwant Singh	140	1.19	
NCP	Bishan Dass Baboria	136	0.19	
AIFB	Qari Zaheer Abbas Bhatti	84	0.12	
Majority		11,251	15.42	
Turnout		72,975	60.46	
Registered electors		1,20,693		
BJP win (new seat)				

== See also ==
- List of constituencies of the Jammu and Kashmir Legislative Assembly
