= Sukh Nandan Kumar =

Indian politician

Sukh Nandan Kumar is an Indian politician and member of the Bharatiya Janata Party. Kumar was a member of the Jammu and Kashmir Legislative Assembly from the Marh constituency in Jammu district. He is very popular among the youth of Jammu district. He has been elected two times from the Marh Constituency.

== Electoral performance ==
Election	Constituency	Party	Result	Votes %	Opposition Candidate	Opposition Party	Opposition vote %	Ref
2014	Marh	BJP	Won	42.35%	Ajay Sadhotra	JKNC	22.99%	
2008	Marh	BJP	Won	35.04%	Ajay Sadhotra	JKNC	22.49%	
2002	Marh	BJP	Lost	29.39%	Ajay Sadhotra	JKNC	31.87%	
1996	Marh	BJP	Lost	27.35%	Ajay Sadhotra	JKNC	29.75%	
