= Kirshan Lal =

Indian politician

Kirshan Lal (born 1955) is an Indian politician from Jammu and Kashmir. He was an MLA from Chhamb Assembly constituency which is reserved for Scheduled Caste community in Jammu district. He won the 2014 Jammu and Kashmir Legislative Assembly election representing the Bharatiya Janata Party.

== Early life and education ==
Lal is from Chhamb, Jammu district, Jammu and Kashmir. He is the son of late Bansi Ram Lal. He is a doctor. He completed his M.B.B.S. in 1982 at a college affiliated with University of Jammu.

== Career ==
Lal won from Chhamb Assembly constituency representing Bharatiya Janata Party in the 2014 Jammu and Kashmir Legislative Assembly election. He polled 36,033 votes and defeated his nearest rival and three time MLA, Tara Chand of Indian National Congress, by a margin of 14,790 votes.
