= Chhamb Assembly constituency =

Constituency of the Jammu and Kashmir Legislative Assembly

Coordinates: 32.84°N 74.40°E

Chhamb
- Constituency No. 82 for the Jammu and Kashmir Legislative Assembly

Constituency details
- Country: India
- State: Jammu and Kashmir
- District: Jammu
- Lok Sabha constituency: Jammu
- Established: 1962

Member of Legislative Assembly
- Incumbent Satish Sharma
- Party: Independent
- Elected year: 2024

Chhamb Assembly constituency is one of the 90 constituencies in the Jammu and Kashmir Legislative Assembly of Jammu and Kashmir a northern union territory of India. Chhamb is also part of Jammu constituency.

== Members of the Legislative Assembly ==
Election	Member	Party
1962	Chhaju Ram Lamba	Jammu & Kashmir National Conference
1967	Chhaju Ram Lamba	Indian National Congress
1972	Diwakar Singh	Indian National Congress
1977	Ram Nath	Independent politician
1983	Madan Lal	Indian National Congress
1987	Madan Lal	Indian National Congress
1996	Tara Chand	Indian National Congress
2002	Tara Chand	Indian National Congress
2008	Tara Chand	Indian National Congress
2014	Kirshan Lal	Bharatiya Janata Party
2024	Satish Sharma	Independent politician

== Election results ==
=== Assembly Election 2024 ===
2024 Jammu and Kashmir Legislative Assembly election : Chhamb
Party	Candidate	Votes	%	±%
Independent	Satish Sharma	33,985	39.09%	New
BJP	Rajeev Sharma	27,056	31.12%	▼29.41
INC	Tara Chand	16,449	18.92%	▼16.77
Independent	Narinder Singh	8,005	9.21%	New
NOTA	None of the Above	384	0.44%	▲0.07
Margin of victory		6,929	7.97%	▼16.88
Turnout		86,946	84.19%	▲6.64
Registered electors		1,03,277		▲34.54
Independent gain from BJP		Swing	▼21.44	

=== Assembly Election 2014 ===
2014 Jammu and Kashmir Legislative Assembly election : Chhamb
Party	Candidate	Votes	%	±%
BJP	Kirshan Lal	36,033	60.53%	▲16.53
INC	Tara Chand	21,243	35.69%	▼12.90
JKPDP	Madan Lal	653	1.10%	New
NOTA	None of the Above	223	0.37%	New
Margin of victory		14,790	24.85%	▲20.25
Turnout		59,528	77.55%	▼0.81
Registered electors		76,763		▲15.36
BJP gain from INC		Swing	▲11.94	

=== Assembly Election 2008 ===
2008 Jammu and Kashmir Legislative Assembly election : Chhamb
Party	Candidate	Votes	%	±%
INC	Tara Chand	25,335	48.59%	▲2.30
BJP	Chaman Lal	22,940	44.00%	New
JKNC	Mohan Lal	2,321	4.45%	▼18.65
JKNPP	Janak Raj	645	1.24%	▼3.06
BSP	Ganga Dutt	488	0.94%	▼1.26
Margin of victory		2,395	4.59%	▼18.60
Turnout		52,140	78.35%	▲7.95
Registered electors		66,545		▲5.14
INC hold		Swing	▲2.30	

=== Assembly Election 2002 ===
2002 Jammu and Kashmir Legislative Assembly election : Chhamb
Party	Candidate	Votes	%	±%
INC	Tara Chand	20,630	46.30%	▲11.15
JKNC	Chhaju Ram Lamba	10,296	23.10%	▼3.22
Independent	Chaman Lal	9,288	20.84%	New
JKNPP	Subash Chander	1,916	4.30%	New
Independent	Tej Ram	995	2.23%	New
BSP	Sham Lal	978	2.19%	New
Independent	Hans Raj	459	1.03%	New
Margin of victory		10,334	23.19%	▲21.35
Turnout		44,562	70.47%	▼1.02
Registered electors		63,294		▲25.46
INC hold		Swing	▲11.15	

=== Assembly Election 1996 ===
1996 Jammu and Kashmir Legislative Assembly election : Chhamb
Party	Candidate	Votes	%	±%
INC	Tara Chand	12,663	35.15%	▼17.35
BJP	Tej Ram	12,001	33.31%	▼3.19
JKNC	Ganga Dutt	9,485	26.33%	New
Independent	Harnam Dass	1,036	2.88%	New
JD	Sham Lal	845	2.35%	New
Margin of victory		662	1.84%	▼14.16
Turnout		36,030	72.07%	▼8.52
Registered electors		50,448		▲36.35
INC hold		Swing	▼17.35	

=== Assembly Election 1987 ===
1987 Jammu and Kashmir Legislative Assembly election : Chhamb
Party	Candidate	Votes	%	±%
INC	Madan Lal	15,527	52.50%	▼4.74
BJP	Ram Nath	10,795	36.50%	▲19.40
Independent	Dayal Singh	2,285	7.73%	New
Independent	Bansi Lal	226	0.76%	New
JP	Raghubir Singh	210	0.71%	▼0.31
Independent	Chhaju Ram Lamba	190	0.64%	New
Margin of victory		4,732	16.00%	▼24.14
Turnout		29,577	81.06%	▲6.88
Registered electors		37,000		▲9.81
INC hold		Swing	▼4.74	

=== Assembly Election 1983 ===
1983 Jammu and Kashmir Legislative Assembly election : Chhamb
Party	Candidate	Votes	%	±%
INC	Madan Lal	14,090	57.23%	▲40.32
BJP	Ram Nath	4,208	17.09%	New
JKNC	Bodh Raj	4,145	16.84%	▲0.76
Independent	Baldev Singh	1,652	6.71%	New
JP	Raghubir Singh	252	1.02%	▼12.51
Independent	Satgur Parkash	178	0.72%	New
Margin of victory		9,882	40.14%	▲18.53
Turnout		24,618	74.27%	▼0.14
Registered electors		33,696		▲1.59
INC gain from Independent		Swing	▲18.72	

=== Assembly Election 1977 ===
1977 Jammu and Kashmir Legislative Assembly election : Chhamb
Party	Candidate	Votes	%	±%
Independent	Ram Nath	9,352	38.52%	New
INC	Dewan Singh	4,106	16.91%	▼38.84
JKNC	Bodh Raj	3,904	16.08%	New
JP	Kanwar Divakar Singh	3,286	13.53%	New
Independent	Pritam Dass	1,351	5.56%	New
Independent	Chain Singh	1,309	5.39%	New
Independent	Bharat Vinod Dutt	971	4.00%	New
Margin of victory		5,246	21.61%	▼9.35
Turnout		24,279	74.39%	▼2.41
Registered electors		33,170		▲11.91
Independent gain from INC		Swing	▼17.23	

=== Assembly Election 1972 ===
1972 Jammu and Kashmir Legislative Assembly election : Chhamb
Party	Candidate	Votes	%	±%
INC	Diwakar Singh	12,495	55.75%	▲12.36
ABJS	Ram Nath	5,558	24.80%	▼13.29
Independent	Bodh Raj	2,999	13.38%	New
Independent	Shankar Singh	510	2.28%	New
Independent	Chain Singh	281	1.25%	New
INC(O)	Suresh Kumar	255	1.14%	New
Independent	Devi Dayal Nidar	184	0.82%	New
Margin of victory		6,937	30.95%	▲25.65
Turnout		22,411	77.87%	▼3.17
Registered electors		29,641		▲9.34
INC hold		Swing	▲12.36	

=== Assembly Election 1967 ===
1967 Jammu and Kashmir Legislative Assembly election : Chhamb
Party	Candidate	Votes	%	±%
INC	Chhaju Ram Lamba	9,267	43.39%	New
ABJS	S. Singh	8,135	38.09%	New
Democratic National Conference	D. Raj	1,535	7.19%	New
Independent	A. Nath	1,399	6.55%	New
JKNC	D. Dyal	857	4.01%	▼48.84
Independent	L. Devi	165	0.77%	New
Margin of victory		1,132	5.30%	▼14.19
Turnout		21,358	82.29%	▲6.90
Registered electors		27,110		▲1.54
INC gain from JKNC		Swing	▼9.46	

=== Assembly Election 1962 ===
1962 Jammu and Kashmir Legislative Assembly election : Chhamb
Party	Candidate	Votes	%	±%
JKNC	Chhaju Ram Lamba	10,142	52.85%	New
JPP	Sahdev Singh	6,401	33.36%	New
Independent	Devi Dayal	1,683	8.77%	New
Harijan Mandal	Pishori Lal	964	5.02%	New
Margin of victory		3,741	19.49%	
Turnout		19,190	74.41%	
Registered electors		26,698		
JKNC win (new seat)				

== See also ==
- Chhamb
- List of constituencies of Jammu and Kashmir Legislative Assembly
