= Mula Ram =

Indian politician

Cabinet Minister of Government of Jammu and Kashmir
- In office 2005 - 2008

Personal details
- Political party: Indian National Congress

Mula Ram is a former minister of social justice in Jammu and Kashmir, India. He is a leader of Indian National Congress. He elected was Raipur-Domana and Marh constituency in Jammu and Kashmir Legislative Assembly.
