= Surinder Kumar (politician) =

Indian politician

Member of Jammu and Kashmir Legislative Assembly
- Incumbent
- Assumed office 8 October 2024
- Preceded by: Sukh Nandan Kumar
- Constituency: Marh

Personal details
- Party: Bharatiya Janata Party
- Profession: Politician

Surinder Kumar (born 1982) is an Indian politician from Jammu & Kashmir. He is a Member of the Jammu & Kashmir Legislative Assembly representing the Bharatiya Janta Party from Marh Assembly constituency which is reserved for Scheduled Caste community in Jammu district.

== Early life and education ==
Kumar is from Marh, Jammu district, Jammu and Kashmir. He is the son of Dayal Chand. He passed Class 8 at Government High School, Gajansoo in 1999 and later discontinued his studies.

== Career ==
Kumar won from Marh Assembly constituency representing Bharatiya Janata Party in the 2024 Jammu and Kashmir Legislative Assembly election. He polled 42,563 votes and defeated his nearest rival, Mula Ram of Indian National Congress, by a margin of 23,086 votes.

== See also ==
- 2024 Jammu & Kashmir Legislative Assembly election
- Jammu and Kashmir Legislative Assembly
