= Marh =

- Village
- Location in Jammu and Kashmir, India Marh (India)
- Coordinates: 32.90°N 74.82°E
- Country: India
- Union Territory: Jammu and Kashmir
- District: Jammu

Population (2011)
  - Total: 1,185

Languages
  - Spoken: Dogri, Hindi
- Time zone: UTC+5:30 (IST)

Marh is a village and municipality in Jammu district of the Indian union territory of Jammu and Kashmir. The village is located 26 kilometres from district headquarters Jammu.

== Demographics ==
According to the 2011 census of India, Wavoora has 228 households. The literacy rate of Marh village was 82.06% compared to 67.16% of Jammu and Kashmir. In Marh, Male literacy stands at 88.63% while the female literacy rate was 74.60%.

Demographics (2011 Census)
	Total	Male	Female
Population	1185	629	556
Children aged below 6 years	126	66	60
Scheduled caste	388	212	176
Scheduled tribe	22	9	13
Literacy	82.06%	88.63%	74.60%
Workers (all)	392	347	45
Main workers (total)	374	–	–
Marginal workers (total)	18	14	4

== Transport ==
=== Road ===
Marh is connected by road with other places in Jammu and Kashmir and India by the NH 144A.

=== Rail ===
The nearest railway station to Marh is Jammu Tawi railway station located at a distance of 30 kilometres.

=== Air ===
The nearest airport is Jammu Airport located at a distance of 32 kilometres.

== See also ==
- Marh (Vidhan Sabha constituency)
