= Kuldeep Raj Dubey =

Indian politician

Member of Jammu and Kashmir Legislative Assembly
- Incumbent
- Assumed office 8 October 2024
- Preceded by: Ajay Nanda
- Constituency: Reasi Assembly constituency

Personal details
- Party: Bharatiya Janata Party
- Profession: Politician

Kuldeep Raj Dubey is an Indian politician from Jammu & Kashmir. He is a Member of the Jammu & Kashmir Legislative Assembly from 2024, representing Reasi Assembly constituency as a Member of the Bharatiya Janta Party.
