= Shri Mata Vaishno Devi Assembly constituency =

Constituency of the Jammu and Kashmir legislative assembly in India

Shri Mata Vaishno Devi
- Constituency No. 58 for the Jammu and Kashmir Legislative Assembly

Constituency details
- Country: India
- State: Jammu and Kashmir
- District: Reasi
- Lok Sabha constituency: Jammu
- Established: 2022

Member of Legislative Assembly
- Incumbent Baldev Raj Sharma
- Party: BJP
- Alliance: NDA
- Elected year: 2024

Shri Mata Vaishno Devi Assembly constituency is one of the 90 constituencies in the Jammu and Kashmir Legislative Assembly of Jammu and Kashmir a north state of India. Vaishno Devi is also part of Jammu Lok Sabha constituency.

== Members of Legislative Assembly ==
Year	Member	Party
2024	Baldev Raj Sharma	Bharatiya Janata Party

== Election results ==
=== Assembly Election 2024 ===
2024 Jammu and Kashmir Legislative Assembly election : Shri Mata Vaishno Devi
Party	Candidate	Votes	%	±%
BJP	Baldev Raj Sharma	18,199	39.96%	New
Independent	Jugal Kishore	16,204	35.58%	New
INC	Bhupinder Singh	5,655	12.42%	New
Independent	Sham Singh	4,191	9.20%	New
Independent	Raj Kumar	434	0.95%	New
NOTA	None of the Above	355	0.78%	New
Independent	Bansi Lal	296	0.65%	New
Margin of victory		1,995	4.38%	
Turnout		45,544	80.75%	
Registered electors		56,401		
BJP win (new seat)				

== See also ==
- List of constituencies of the Jammu and Kashmir Legislative Assembly
