= Vikram Randhawa =

Indian politician

Member of Jammu and Kashmir Legislative Assembly
- Incumbent
- Assumed office 8 October 2024
- Constituency: Bahu

Personal details
- Party: Bharatiya Janata Party
- Profession: Politician

Vikram Randhawa is an Indian politician from Jammu & Kashmir. He is a Member of the Jammu & Kashmir Legislative Assembly from 2024, representing Bahu Assembly constituency as a Member of the Bharatiya Janata Party Randhawa has previously served as a member of the Legislative Council (MLC) from BJP.

== Electoral performance ==
Election	Constituency	Party	Result	Votes %	Opposition Candidate	Opposition Party	Opposition vote %	Ref
2024	Bahu	BJP	Won	55.34%	Taranjit Singh Tony	INC	39.92%	

== See also ==
- 2024 Jammu & Kashmir Legislative Assembly election
- Jammu and Kashmir Legislative Assembly
