= Dogra Law College =

Law college in Jammu and Kashmir

Coordinates: 32.6366°N 74.9143°E

Dogra Law College is a private law school situated at Bari Brahmana, Duggar land in Jammu in the Indian union territory of Jammu and Kashmir. It offers undergraduate 3 years law courses, 5 Year Integrated LL.B. courses, approved by Bar Council of India (BCI), New Delhi and affiliated to University of Jammu.

== History ==
In 1999, Government of Jammu and Kashmir permitted to establish the college and University of Jammu granted affiliation. Finally in 2000, Dogra Law College was established after the accreditation of the Bar Council of India.
