= Choudhary Piara Singh =

Indian politician (died 2024)

Choudhary Piara Singh (died 2 December 2024) was an Indian politician and member of Bharatiya Janta Party from Jammu and Kashmir. Singh was a member of the Jammu and Kashmir Legislative Assembly from the Gandhinagar constituency in Jammu district. He died on 2 December 2024.
