= Aga Syed Mohsin Al Mosvi =

Kashmiri Shia Cleric

Aga Syed Mohsin Mustafa Al Mosvi
- آغا سید محسن مصطفیٰ
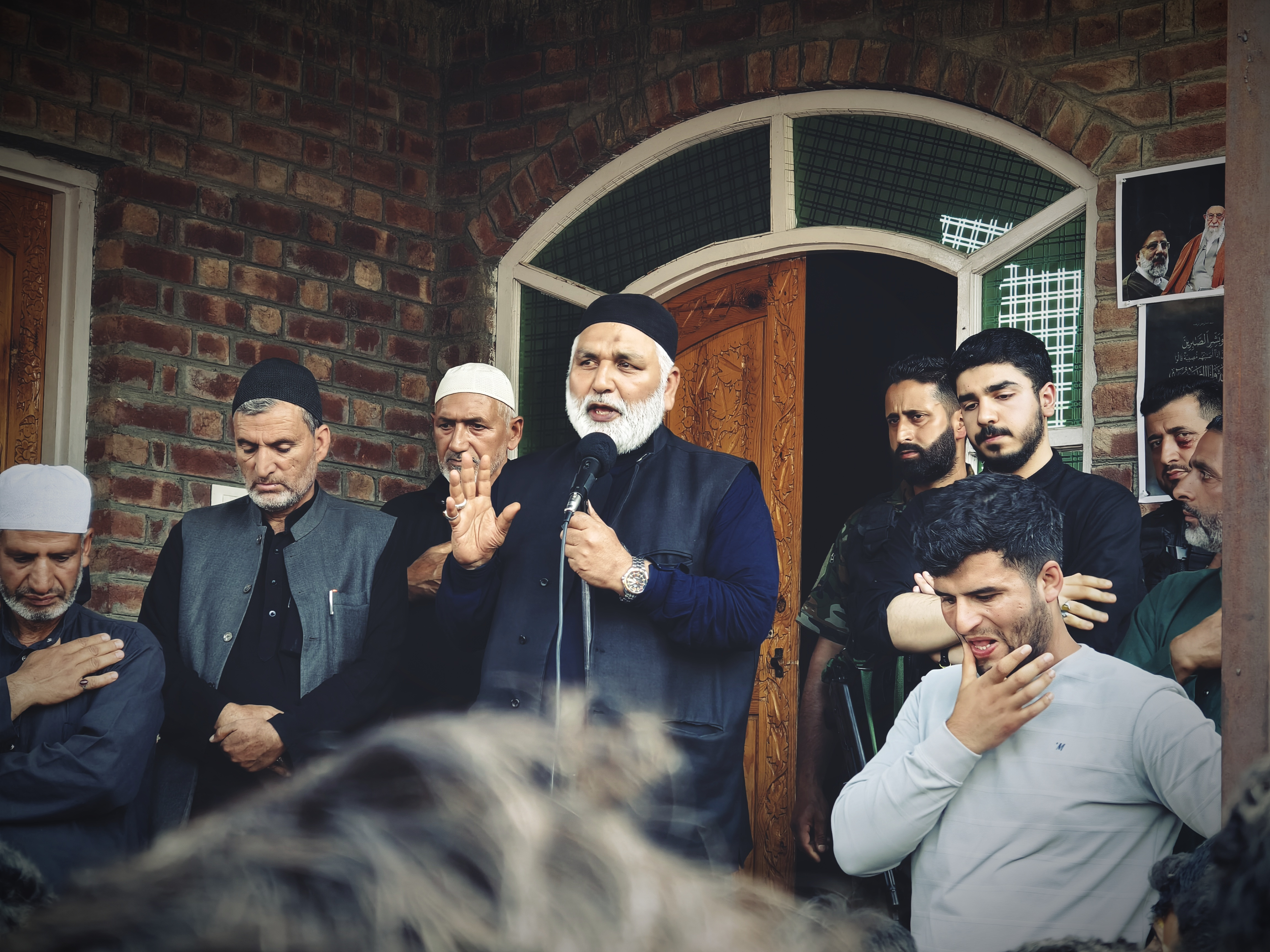

Personal details
- Born: 13 May 1964 (age 61) Budgam, Jammu and Kashmir, India
- Party: Jammu & Kashmir National Conference
- Other political affiliations: Jammu and Kashmir Anjuman e Shari- Shian
- Children: Three, Elder Son = Aga Syed Owais Abass Al Moosvi

Aga Syed Mohsin Mustafa Al Mosvi is a cleric, political leader and a member of the esteemed Aga family of Budgam. He is the son of the late Shia religious scholar Aga Syed Mustafa Moosavi, and the brother of the late Aga Syed Hussain and Aga Syed Mehdi.
