= Săseni =

- Commune
- Location within Moldova
- Coordinates: 47.3688888889°N 28.5005555556°E
- Country: Moldova
- District: Călărași District

Population (2014)
  - Total: 2,249
- Time zone: UTC+2 (EET)
  - Summer (DST): UTC+3 (EEST)

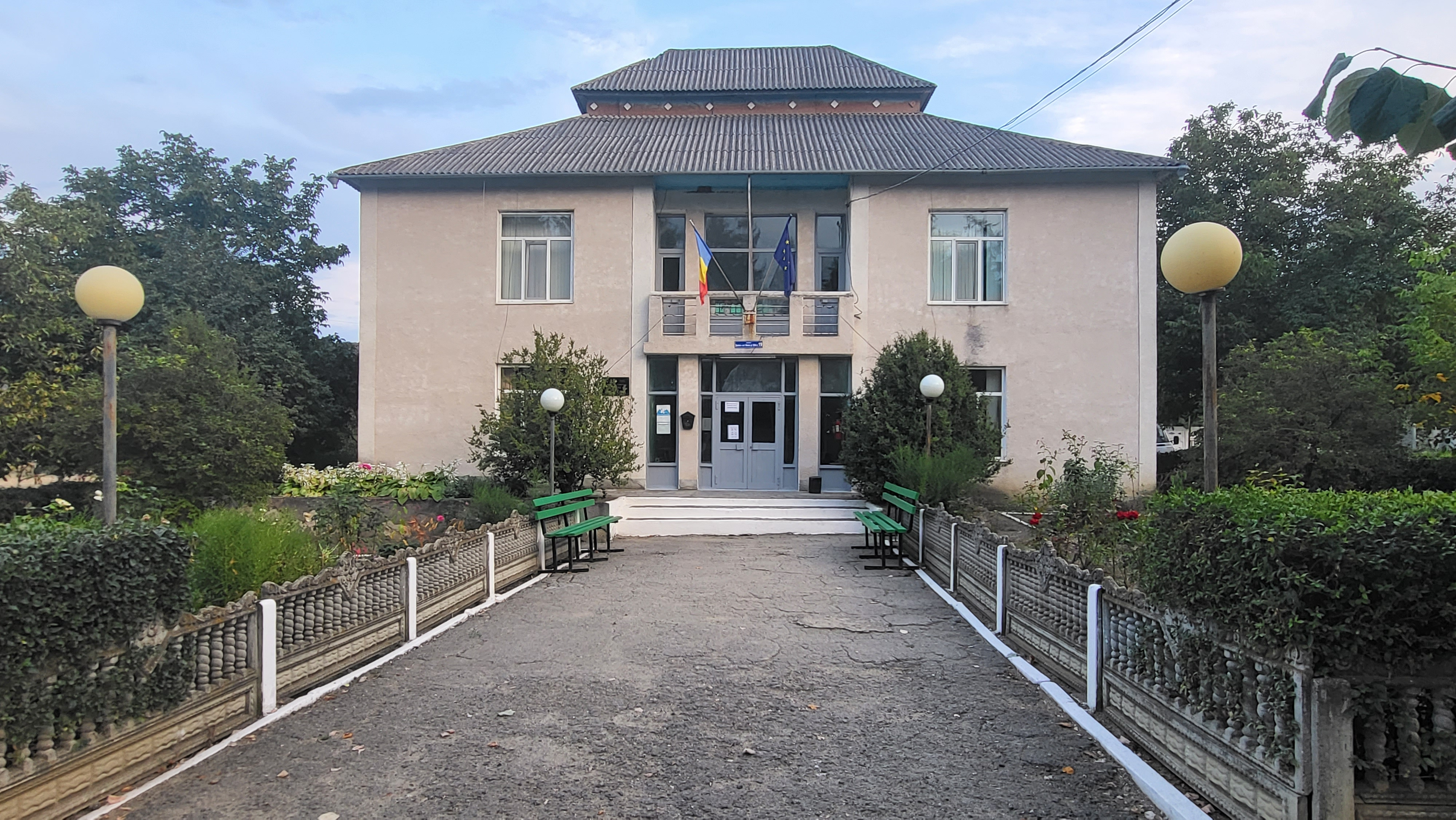
Säseni village town hall

Săseni is a commune in Călărași District, Moldova. It is composed of two villages, Bahu and Săseni.
