= Ajay Nanda =

Indian politician

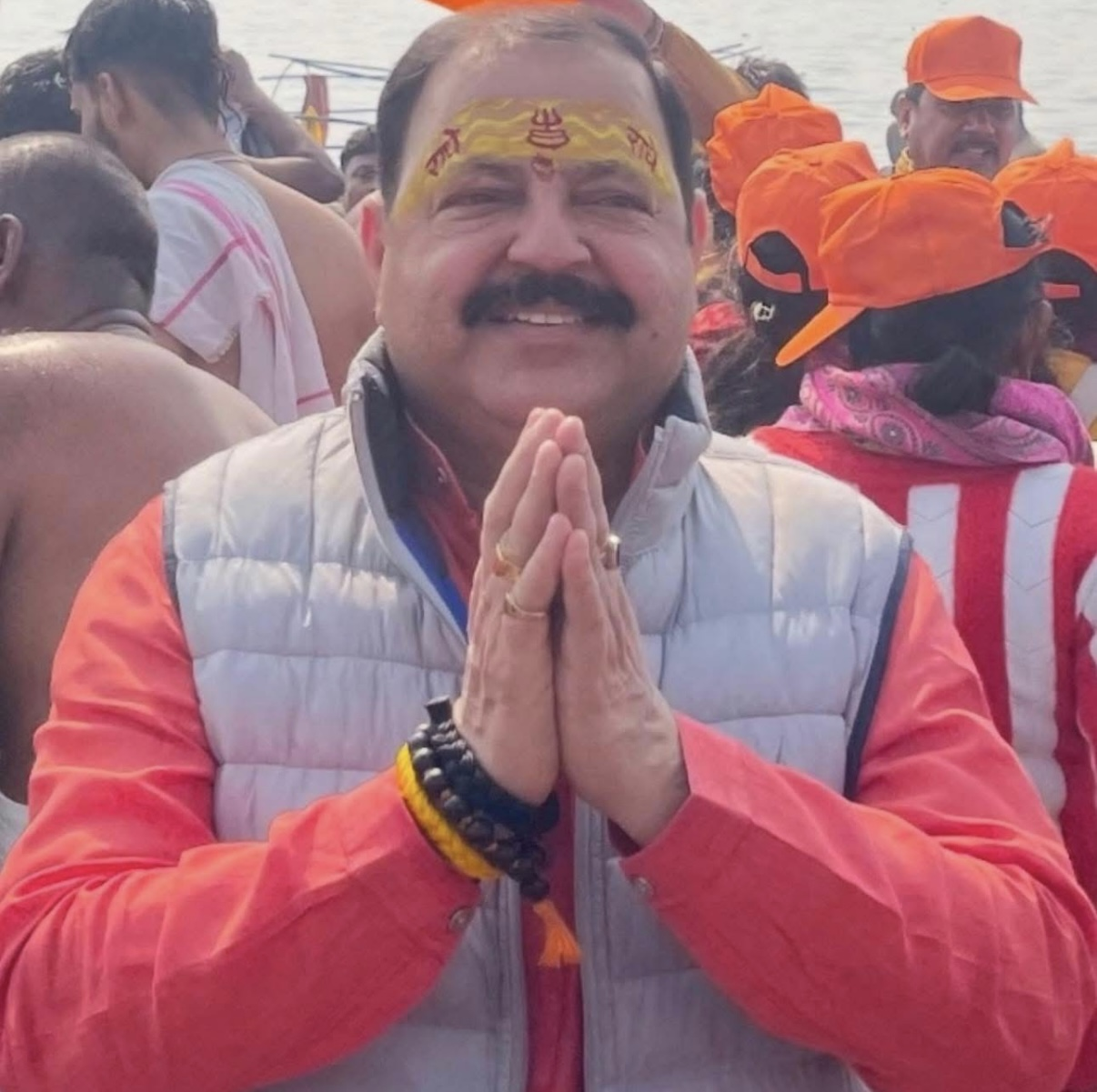

Member of the Jammu and Kashmir Legislative Assembly
- In office 2014–2018
- Constituency: Reasi

Personal details
- Born: 1967 (age 58–59)
- Party: Bharatiya Janata Party
- Parent: Madhav Lal Nanda (father)
- Education: Chaudhary Charan Singh University

Ajay Nanda (born 1967) is an Indian politician from Jammu and Kashmir. He was an MLA from Reasi Assembly constituency in Reasi district. He won the 2014 Jammu and Kashmir Legislative Assembly election representing the Bharatiya Janata Party.

Ajay Nanda has served as the Minister of State for Finance and Planning, Information Technology, Law, Justice and Parliamentary Affairs, Consumer Affairs and Public Distribution, Tribal Affairs, Relief & Rehabilitation, and Labour and Employment during the Mehbooba Mufti ministry.

He was dropped by the BJP for the 2024 Assembly election.

== Early life and education ==
Nanda is from Reasi, Reasi district, Jammu and Kashmir. He completed his BSc and later did LLB in 1994 at Chaudhary Charan Singh University, Meerut.

== Family background ==
Nanda is the son of Madhav Lal Nanda (1928–1999), an advocate and the elder son of Roop Chand Nanda, a Reasi lawyer who led the Jammu Praja Parishad in 1949 during the agitation for the release of its detained leader Prem Nath Dogra; during that agitation Madhav Lal Nanda courted arrest by leading a procession in defiance of prohibitory orders and remained imprisoned until Dogra and other leaders were released. Roop Chand Nanda had also been associated with the Hindu Mahasabha. Madhav Lal Nanda served as president of the Hindu Dharam Sabha and Sanatan Dharam Sabha, and in 1987 he contested the Jammu and Kashmir Legislative Assembly election as a Bharatiya Janata Party candidate.

== Career ==
Nanda won from Reasi Assembly constituency representing Bharatiya Janata Party in the 2014 Jammu and Kashmir Legislative Assembly election. He polled 22,017 votes and defeated his nearest rival, Saraf Singh, an independent candidate, by a margin of 1,887 votes.

Following the formation of the PDP–BJP coalition government under Mehbooba Mufti in April 2016, Nanda was appointed a Minister of State. As Minister of State for Finance, he presented the state's 2017–18 Annual Financial Statement (budget) and delivered the budget speech in the Jammu and Kashmir Legislative Council, the upper house, on 11 January 2017.

In February 2018 he informed the legislature that the government had notified a policy (SRO 520 of 21 December 2017) for the regularisation of daily-rated workers and casual labourers, under which about 100,501 workers had registered, and he tabled the state's Finance Accounts and Appropriation Accounts for 2016–17 in the Council. His term as minister ended in June 2018, when the BJP withdrew support from the coalition and the government fell, leading to Governor's rule.

== Social work ==
The Madhav Lal Nanda (MLN) Memorial Trust in Reasi, founded in 2003, holds an annual function honouring the district's academic toppers with cash prizes, run under Nanda's management; its 22nd annual function was held in December 2024.
