= Baldev Raj =

Indian scientist (1947–2018)

- Born: 9 April 1947; Jammu and Kashmir, India
- Died: 6 January 2018 (aged 70); Pune
- Education: Indian Institute of Science; National Institute of Technology, Raipur; Bhabha Atomic Research Centre (BARC)
- Scientific career
- Workplaces: National Institute of Advanced Studies; Indira Gandhi Centre for Atomic Research (IGCAR); Indian Institute of Technology, Gandhinagar; National Institute of Technology Puducherry

Baldev Raj (9 April 1947 – 6 January 2018) was an Indian scientist and director of the Indira Gandhi Centre for Atomic Research (IGCAR) in Kalpakkam, India.

== Education ==
He had a Bachelors in Engineering (B.E.) from Government Engineering College, Raipur Pt. Ravishankar Shukla University, Raipur (Now National Institute of Technology, Raipur), and a PhD from IISc, Bangalore, D.Sc. (h.c.) from Sathyabama Deemed University, Chennai.

== Career ==
He was director of the Indira Gandhi Centre for Atomic Research (IGCAR) in Kalpakkam, India. He was also the director of the National Institute of Advanced Studies.

He died on 6 January 2018 in Pune from an apparent cardiac arrest.

== Awards ==
He was awarded one of the H K Firodia awards, padma shri award also for 2015.
