= Tara Chand (Jammu-Kashmir politician) =

Indian politician

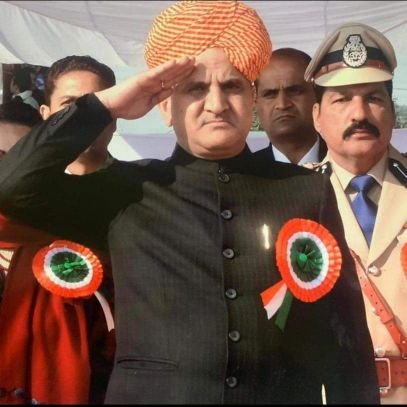

Deputy Chief Minister of Jammu and Kashmirstate
- In office 5 January 2009 – 24 December 2014
- Governor: Narinder Nath Vohra
- Chief Minister: Omar Abdullah
- Preceded by: Muzaffar Hussain Baig
- Succeeded by: Nirmal Kumar Singh
- Constituency: 80-Chhamb

Speaker of the Jammu and Kashmir Legislative Assembly
- In office 21 November 2002 – 5 January 2009
- Preceded by: Abdul Ahad Vakil
- Succeeded by: Mohammad Akbar Lone

Personal details
- Born: 1963 (age 62–63) Chak Malal village, Akhnoor (J&K)
- Other political affiliations: Indian National Congress (until 2022 and again from Jan 2023); Democratic Azad Party (September 2022—December 2022)
- Spouse: Kanta Devi
- Children: 2
- Occupation: Politician

Tara Chand is a politician and a leader from Jammu and Kashmir. He was Deputy Chief Minister of erstwhile state of Jammu and Kashmir from 2009 to 2014. He had earlier served as the Speaker of the Jammu and Kashmir Legislative Assembly. On 30 August 2022, he resigned from Indian National Congress in support of Ghulam Nabi Azad. He was appointed as Vice chairperson for Democratic Azad Party. On 22 December 2022, he was removed from Democratic Azad Party after the allegations of 'anti-party' activities.

In the 2014 elections, Chand lost to BJP candidate Dr Krishan Lal in Chhamb Assembly constituency of Jammu district. He finished 3rd in 2024 election. On 30 August 2022, he quit Congress in support of Ghulam Nabi Azad.
