= Ajay Sadhotra =

Indian politician

Ajay Sadhotra (born 29 December 1955) is a senior Indian politician from Jammu and Kashmir. He belongs to the National Conference, a party formed by veteran leader Sheikh Abdullah.

He was a General Secretary at Youth National Conference, vice-president, Jammu & Kashmir National Conference, Jammu Province.

In 1996 and 2002, he was elected as a Member of Legislative Assembly, Marh. From 1996 to 2002, he served as a Minister of Agriculture, CAPD, Transport, Rural Development & Panchayati Raj.

He was a Deputy Leader Jammu & Kashmir National Conference, Legislative Party in J&K Legislative Assembly.

From 2003 to 2009, he served as a Provincial President, Jammu & Kashmir National Conference, Jammu. Since 2009 - Member of Legislative Council.

He has attended the Food Ministers conference, chaired by Honorable Prime Minister Shri Atal Bihari Vajpayee, and the Panchayati Raj conference, chaired by Honorable Prime minister.
