= Madan Lal Sharma =

Indian politician (1952–2020)

Member of the India Parliament for Jammu
- In office 2004–2014
- Preceded by: Choudhary Talib Hussain
- Succeeded by: Jugal Kishore Sharma
- Constituency: Jammu

Personal details
- Born: 22 April 1952 Jammu, Jammu and Kashmir, India
- Died: 23 December 2020 (aged 68) Jammu, Jammu and Kashmir, India
- Party: INC
- Spouse: Chano Devi
- Children: 1 son and 2 daughters
- As of 16 September, 2006

Madan Lal Sharma (22 April 1952 – 23 December 2020) was an Indian politician.

Sharma was born in a Dogra Brahmin family in Jammu. He represented the Jammu-Poonch Loksabha constituency of Jammu and Kashmir from 2004 to 2014 and was a member of the Indian National Congress (INC) political party.

He also contested the 2014 Lok Sabha Elections on Congress ticket but was defeated by the BJP candidate Jugal Kishore Sharma.

He died in 2020 after testing positive for COVID-19 during the COVID-19 pandemic in India.
