= Raman Bhalla =

Indian politician

Raman Bhalla Chouhan
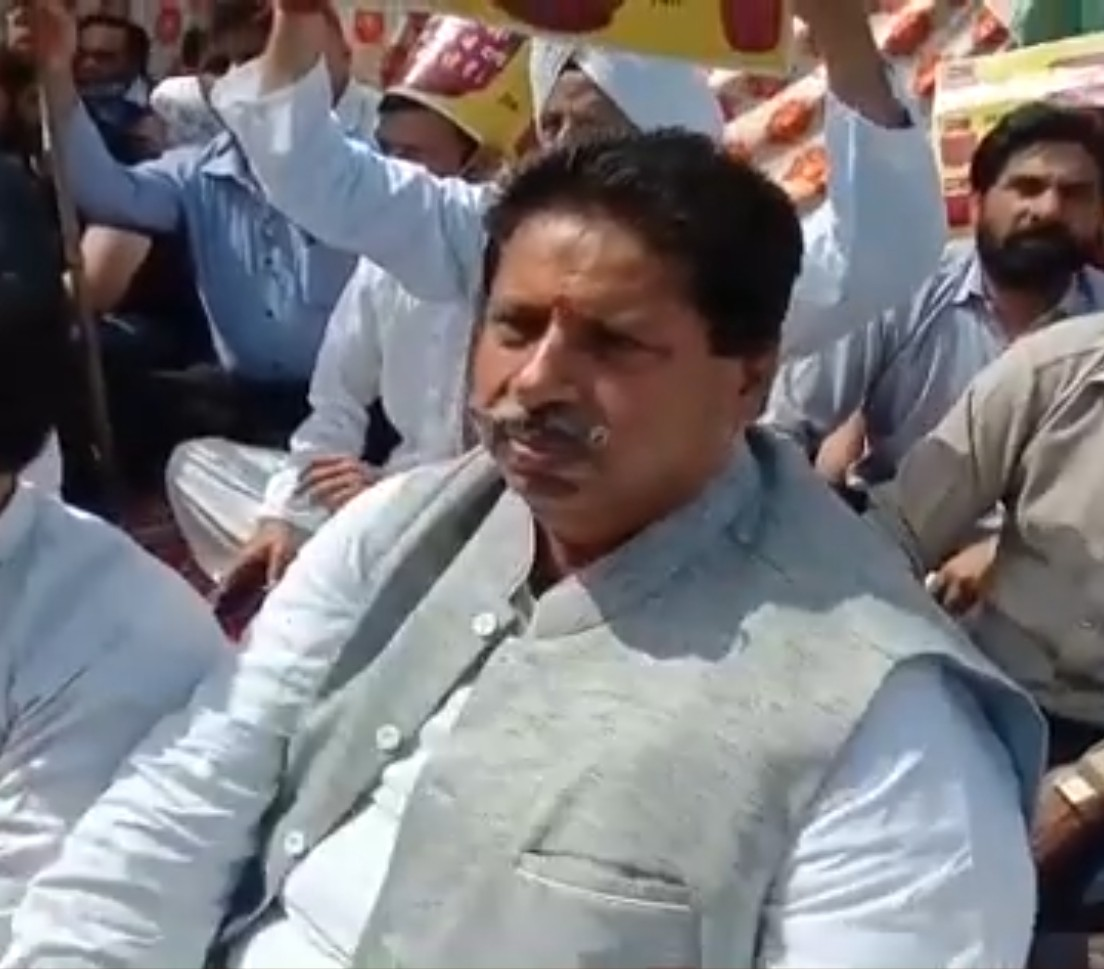

Member of Jammu and Kashmir Legislative Assembly
- In office 2002 – 2014
- Preceded by: Choudhary Piara Singh
- Succeeded by: Kavinder Gupta
- Constituency: Gandhinagar

Raman Bhalla is an Indian politician from Jammu and Kashmir and member of Indian National Congress. He is working president of the Jammu and Kashmir Pradesh Congress. He was a member of the Jammu and Kashmir Legislative Assembly from 2002 to 2014, twice elected from Gandhinagar.
