= 12th Jammu and Kashmir Assembly =

Indian election in 2014

←	11th Assembly	1st Assembly (UT)	→

Overview
- Legislative body: Jammu and Kashmir Legislative Assembly
- Term: 31 December 2014 – 12 November 2018
- Election: 2014 Jammu and Kashmir Legislative Assembly election
- Government: Mehbooba Mufti ministry
- Opposition: Jammu and Kashmir National Conference
- Members: 89 (87 elected + 2 nominated)
- Speaker: Nirmal Kumar Singh
- Leader of the House: Mehbooba Mufti
- Deputy Leader of the House: Kavinder Gupta
- Party control: Jammu and Kashmir Peoples Democratic Party

The Twelfth Legislative Assembly of Jammu and Kashmir constituted after the 2014 Jammu and Kashmir Legislative Assembly elections which were concluded on 20 December 2014, with the results being declared on 23 December 2014.

== Membership by party ==

- JKPDP (28)
- BJP (25)
- JKNC (15)
- INC (12)
- JKPC (2)
- CPI(M) (1)
- JKPDF (1)
- IND (3)
- NOM (2)

== Members of Legislative Assembly ==
No.	Constituency	Name	Party	Remarks
1	Karnah	Raja Manzoor Ahmad	Jammu and Kashmir Peoples Democratic Party	
2	Kupwara	Bashir Ahmad Dar	Jammu and Kashmir People's Conference	
3	Lolab	Abdul Haq Khan	Jammu and Kashmir Peoples Democratic Party	
4	Handwara	Sajjad Lone	Jammu and Kashmir People's Conference	
5	Langate	Engineer Rashid	Independent	
6	Uri	Mohammad Shafi	Jammu & Kashmir National Conference	
7	Rafiabad	Yawar Ahmad Mir	Jammu and Kashmir Peoples Democratic Party	
8	Sopore	Abdul Rashid Dar	Indian National Congress	
9	Gurez	Nazir Ahmad Khan	Jammu & Kashmir National Conference	
10	Bandipora	Usman Abdul Majid	Indian National Congress	
11	Sonawari	Mohammad Akbar Lone	Jammu & Kashmir National Conference	
12	Sangrama	Basharat Ahmed	Jammu and Kashmir Peoples Democratic Party	
13	Baramulla	Javid Hassan Baig	Jammu and Kashmir Peoples Democratic Party	
14	Gulmarg	Mohammad Abass Wani	Jammu and Kashmir Peoples Democratic Party	
15	Pattan	Imran Raza Ansari	Jammu and Kashmir Peoples Democratic Party	
16	Kangan	Altaf Ahmad	Jammu & Kashmir National Conference	
17	Ganderbal	Ishfaq Ahmad Sheikh	Jammu & Kashmir National Conference	
18	Hazratbal	Asia Naqash	Jammu and Kashmir Peoples Democratic Party	
19	Zadibal	Abid Hussain Ansari	Jammu and Kashmir Peoples Democratic Party	
20	Eidgah	Mubarik Ahmad Gul	Jammu & Kashmir National Conference	
21	Khanyar	Ali Mohd Sagar	Jammu & Kashmir National Conference	
22	Habba Kadal	Shamim Firdous	Jammu & Kashmir National Conference	
23	Amira Kadal	Syed Mohammad Altaf Bukhari	Jammu and Kashmir Peoples Democratic Party	
24	Sonawar	Mohammad Ashraf Mir	Jammu and Kashmir Peoples Democratic Party	
25	Batmaloo	Noor Mohammad Sheikh	Jammu and Kashmir Peoples Democratic Party	
26	Chadoora	Javaid Mustafa Mir	Jammu and Kashmir Peoples Democratic Party	
27	Budgam	Aga Syed Ruhullah Mehdi	Jammu & Kashmir National Conference	
28	Beerwah	Omar Abdullah	Jammu & Kashmir National Conference	
29	Khan Sahib	Hakeem Mohammad Yaseen Shah	Jammu and Kashmir People's Democratic Front	
30	Charari Sharief	Ghulam Nabi Lone	Jammu and Kashmir Peoples Democratic Party	
31	Tral	Mushtaq Ahmad Shah	Jammu and Kashmir Peoples Democratic Party	
32	Pampore	Zahoor Ahmad Mir	Jammu and Kashmir Peoples Democratic Party	
33	Pulwama	Mohammad Khalil Band	Jammu and Kashmir Peoples Democratic Party	
34	Rajpora	Haseeb Drabu	Jammu and Kashmir Peoples Democratic Party	
35	Wachi	Aijaz Ahmad Mir	Jammu and Kashmir Peoples Democratic Party	
36	Shopian	Mohammad Yousuf Bhat	Jammu and Kashmir Peoples Democratic Party	
37	Noorabad	Abdul Majid Padder	Jammu and Kashmir Peoples Democratic Party	
38	Kulgam	Mohammed Yousuf Tarigami	Communist Party of India (Marxist)	
39	Hom Shali Bugh	Majeed Bhat Laram	Jammu & Kashmir National Conference	
40	Anantnag	Mehbooba Mufti	Jammu and Kashmir Peoples Democratic Party	
41	Devsar	Mohammad Amin Bhat	Indian National Congress	
42	Dooru	Syed Farooq Ahmad Andrabi	Jammu and Kashmir Peoples Democratic Party	
43	Kokernag	Abdul Rahim Rather	Jammu and Kashmir Peoples Democratic Party	
44	Shangus	Gulzar Ahmad Wani	Indian National Congress	
45	Bijbehara	Abdul Rehman Bhat	Jammu and Kashmir Peoples Democratic Party	
46	Pahalgam	Altaf Ahmad Wani	Jammu & Kashmir National Conference	
47	Nubra	Deldan Namgail	Indian National Congress	
48	Leh	Nawang Rigzin Jora	Indian National Congress	
49	Kargil	Asgar Ali Karbalai	Indian National Congress	
50	Zanskar	Syed Mohammad Baqir Rizvi	Independent	
51	Kishtwar	Sunil Kumar Sharma	Bharatiya Janata Party	
52	Inderwal	Ghulam Mohammad Saroori	Indian National Congress	
53	Doda	Shakti Raj	Bharatiya Janata Party	
54	Bhaderwah	Daleep Singh	Bharatiya Janata Party	
55	Ramban	Neelam Kumar Langeh	Bharatiya Janata Party	
56	Banihal	Vikar Rasool Wani	Indian National Congress	
57	Gulabgarh	Mumtaz Ahmed	Indian National Congress	
58	Reasi	Ajay Nanda	Bharatiya Janata Party	
59	Gool Arnas	Ajaz Ahmed Khan	Indian National Congress	
60	Udhampur	Pawan Kumar Gupta	Independent	
61	Chenani	Dina Nath	Bharatiya Janata Party	
62	Ramnagar	Ranbir Singh Pathania	Bharatiya Janata Party	
63	Bani	Ranbir Singh Pathania	Bharatiya Janata Party	
64	Basohli	Lal Singh	Bharatiya Janata Party	
65	Kathua	Rajiv Jasrotia	Bharatiya Janata Party	
66	Billawar	Dr. Nirmal Kumar Singh	Bharatiya Janata Party	
67	Hiranagar	Kuldeep Raj	Bharatiya Janata Party	
68	Samba	Dr. Devinder Kumar Manyal	Bharatiya Janata Party	
69	Vijaypur	Chander Prakash Ganga	Bharatiya Janata Party	
70	Nagrota	Devender Singh Rana	Jammu & Kashmir National Conference	
71	Gandhinagar	Kavinder Gupta	Bharatiya Janata Party	
72	Jammu East	Rajesh Gupta	Bharatiya Janata Party	
73	Jammu West	Sat Paul Sharma	Bharatiya Janata Party	
74	Bishnah	Kamal Verma	Jammu & Kashmir National Conference	
75	RS Pura	Gagan Bhagat	Bharatiya Janata Party	
76	Suchetgarh	Sham Lal Choudhary	Bharatiya Janata Party	
77	Marh	Sukhnandan Kumar	Bharatiya Janata Party	
78	Raipur Domana	Bali Bhagat	Bharatiya Janata Party	
79	Akhnoor	Rajeev Sharma	Bharatiya Janata Party	
80	Chhamb	Kirshan Lal	Bharatiya Janata Party	
81	Nowshera	Ravinder Raina	Bharatiya Janata Party	
82	Darhal	Chowdhary Zulfkar Ali	Jammu and Kashmir Peoples Democratic Party	
83	Rajouri	Qamar Hussain	Jammu and Kashmir Peoples Democratic Party	
84	Kalakote	Abdul Ghani Kohli	Bharatiya Janata Party	
85	Surankote	Chaudhary Mohammad Akram	Indian National Congress	
86	Mendhar	Javed Ahmed Rana	Jammu & Kashmir National Conference	
87	Poonch Haveli	Shah Mohammad Tantray	Jammu and Kashmir Peoples Democratic Party	
	Nominated	Priya Sethi	Bharatiya Janata Party	
	Nominated	Anjum Fazili	Jammu and Kashmir Peoples Democratic Party	
