= 1987 Jammu and Kashmir Legislative Assembly election =

Election held in Indian-administered Kashmir

- 23 March 1987

all 76 seats in Legislative Assembly 39 seats needed for a majority
- Turnout: 74.9%(▲1.70%)
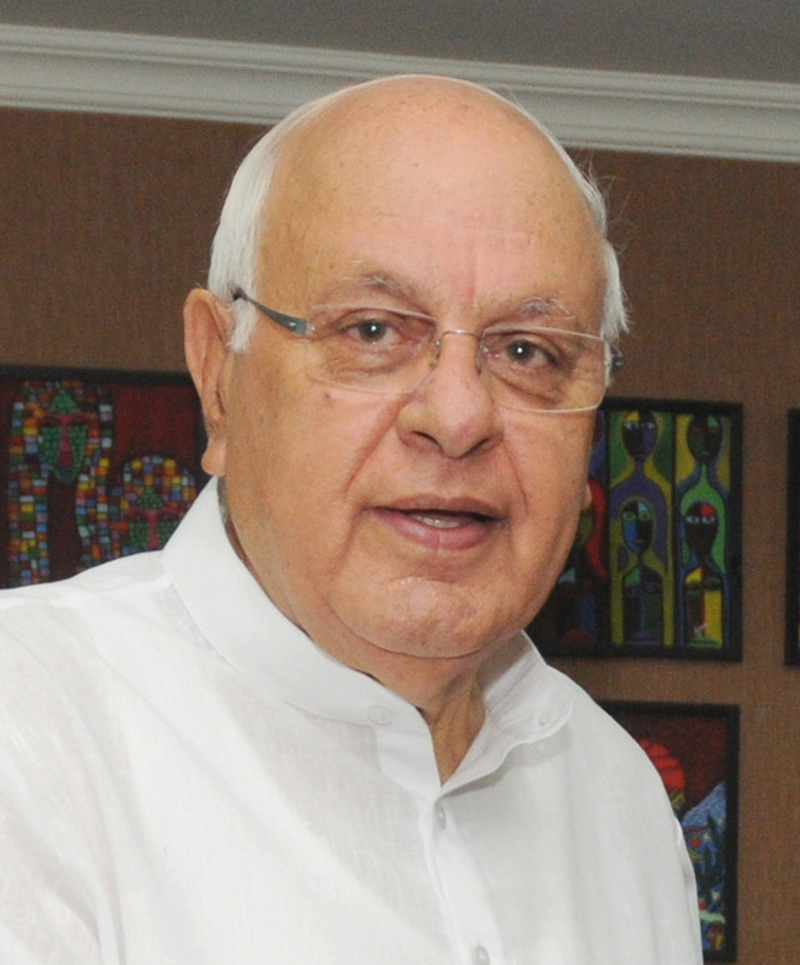

	First party	Second party	Third party
Leader	Farooq Abdullah		Collective leadership
Party	JKNC	INC	MUF
Last election	46	26	0
Seats won	40	26	4
Seat change	▼6	Steady	▲4
Percentage	32.98%	20.20%	18.9%
Swing	▼14.31%	▼10.12%	▲18.9%
	Fourth party	Fifth party
Party	BJP	Independents
Last election	0	4
Seats won	2	4
Seat change	▲2	Steady
Percentage	5.10%	15.86%
Swing	▲1.91%	Steady
Chief Minister before election
Farooq Abdullah
JKNC
Elected Chief Minister
Farooq Abdullah
JKNC

Election for the Indian state of Jammu and Kashmir were held on 23 March 1987. Farooq Abdullah was reappointed as the Chief Minister.

The election is widely perceived to have been rigged. After the following elections to the Parliament in 1989, which saw low turn-out, Governor's Rule was declared in Jammu and Kashmir in 1990, which lasted till 1996.

The 1987 election was a watershed in the politics of the Jammu and Kashmir state.

== Background ==
The background of the 1987 election is fraught with multiple complexities.

During the long years of imprisonment of Sheikh Abdullah, his loyalists split off from the National Conference party and formed a Plebiscite Front. The remaining members of the National Conference merged their party with the Indian National Congress.

After Abdullah's release and his accord with Indira Gandhi, the Congress party accepted him as its own Head and elected him as the State's Chief Minister. However, during the 1977 election, Abdullah shunned the Congress party and revived a new National Conference party from the erstwhile Plebiscite Front. He won the election handsomely.

After Sheikh Abdullah's death, the Congress party again sought an alliance with the National Conference for the 1983 election. It was again shunned and the new leader Farooq Abdullah won the election independently. Congress however emerged as the de facto party of the Jammu region. Congress exploited the internal squabbles in the National Conference and teamed up with Farooq's brother-in-law G. M. Shah to topple Farooq's government. This led to a period of instability during which the Governor's Rule was imposed.

After Rajiv Gandhi became the leader of the Indian National Congress, another accord was reached with Farooq Abdullah. The Governor's Rule was lifted and Farooq returned to power in 1986, but with the understanding that Congress and the National Conference would ally for the 1987 election. In the view of scholar Sten Widmalm, the State's two largest parties had formed an 'election cartel', which had the result that popular discontent could not be channelled.

Before the election, various anti-establishment groups including Jamaat-e-Islami joined hands to form a Muslim United Front (MUF) mainly pointing out that the NC had capitulated before the Centre for the sake of power and bartered away the special status of the State. Efforts were made to arouse Muslim sentiments along communal lines. MUF's election manifesto stressed the need for a solution to all outstanding issues according to Simla Agreement, work for Islamic unity and against political interference from the centre. Their slogan was wanting the law of the Quran in the Assembly.

The NC-Congress(I) combine contested all the 76 seats and the MUF, 43 seats.

== Voting ==
The election was held on 23 March 1987. Nearly 75 percent of the voters participated, the highest recorded participation in the state. Nearly eighty percent of the people in the Valley voted.

Elections for Bhadrawah, Leh and Kargil were held in June 1987.

== Results ==
Party	Votes	%	Seats	+/–
Jammu & Kashmir National Conference	857,830	32.98	40	▼6
Indian National Congress	525,261	20.20	26	0
Bharatiya Janata Party	132,528	5.10	2	▲2
Others	181,175	6.97	0	0
Independents	903,971	34.76	8	▲6
Total	2,600,765	100.00	76	▲1
Valid votes	2,600,765	97.69		
Invalid/blank votes	61,590	2.31		
Total votes	2,662,355	100.00		
Registered voters/turnout	3,555,549	74.88		
Source: ECI

The NC-Congress alliance won 66 seats in the Assembly: NC winning 40 seats of the 45 it contested, and Congress winning 26 out of 31 (5 out of 6 contested seats in the Valley). The alliance received only 53% of the popular vote but garnered 87% of the seats.

The BJP won 2 seats, in Jammu. The MUF expected to win 10 seats out of the 44 seats it contested. But it won only 4 seats, even though it had polled 31% votes. Syed Ali Shah Geelani of Jamaat-e-Islami (a constituent of MUF) won from Sopore.

The disparity between the popular vote and the seat wins was very high. (In comparison, in 1983, the NC and Congress polled 78% of the vote to achieve 95% of the seats.) Scholar Sten Widmalm explains the increased disparity as an effect of forming an "election cartel" (between the NC and Congress), which had a dominant effect in the first-past-the-post election system used in India. The cartel's victory seemed unfair to many Jammu and Kashmir voters, which was magnified when allegations of fraud came to the surface.

The MUF's garnering of 31% of the vote in its first electoral contest has been described as a 'huge' success. Journalist Balraj Puri states that the MUF emerged as the main alternative to the NC-Congress alliance in all parts of the Valley, except the four constituencies of the Kupwara district where People's Conference came in the second place.

The People's Conference did not win a seat despite having been expected to do well in the constituencies of Bandipora, Sangrama, Handwara, and Kupwara. They still managed to capture 93,949 votes.

== Results by constituency ==
Winner, runner-up, voter turnout, and victory margin in every constituency
Assembly Constituency		Turnout	Winner				Runner Up				Margin
#k	Names	%	Candidate	Party	Votes	%	Candidate	Party	Votes	%	Margin
1	Karnah	77.02%	Sharifuddin Shariq	JKNC	20,269	50.88%	Abdul Rashid Mirchl	JKNC	14,844	37.26%	5,425
2	Handwara	82.19%	Chowdary Mohammed Ramzan	JKNC	20,423	46.93%	Abdul Ghani Lone	JKNC	19,093	43.88%	1,330
3	Langate	80.15%	Abdul Ahad Wani	JKNC	10,676	39.57%	Ghulam Quadir Lone	Independent	9,371	34.73%	1,305
4	Kupwara	69.44%	Mushtaq Ahmad Lone	JKNC	12,585	37.06%	Abdul Haq Khan	JKNC	10,806	31.83%	1,779
5	Bandipora	76.66%	Ghulam Rasool Mir	JKNC	17,894	46.25%	Nizam-Ud-Din	JKNC	14,668	37.91%	3,226
6	Sonawari	76.98%	Mohammed Ud-Din Kochey	JKNC	26,819	67.53%	Abdul Khaliq Haneef	Independent	11,146	28.06%	15,673
7	Pattan	82.03%	Aga Syed Mahmood Almosvi	JKNC	16,871	44.02%	Moulvi Mustafa Hussain	Independent	9,291	24.24%	7,580
8	Gulmarg	78.95%	Sheikh Mustafa Kamal	JKNC	19,260	62.36%	Ghulam Hassan Mir	Independent	10,526	34.08%	8,734
9	Sangrama	74.5%	Ghulam Mohiuddin Bhat	JKNC	10,509	41.25%	Vakil Abdul Majid	Independent	6,810	26.73%	3,699
10	Sopore	84.75%	Syed Ali Shah Geelani	Independent	24,392	54.24%	Abdul Ahmad Vakil	JKNC	19,942	44.35%	4,450
11	Rafiabad	77.31%	Ghulam Mohammed Khan	JKNC	12,378	39.99%	Abdul Majid Bhat	Independent	7,066	22.83%	5,312
12	Baramulla	77.35%	Shiekh Mohammed Maqbol	JKNC	16,247	48.06%	Ghulam Mohmad	Independent	14,811	43.81%	1,436
13	Uri	83.42%	Mohammad Shafi	JKNC	27,793	89.61%	Abdul Rehman	Independent	2,565	8.27%	25,228
14	Kangan	80.48%	Mian Altaf Ahmed Larvi	INC	14,644	46.04%	Ghulam Mohammed War	Independent	9,952	31.29%	4,692
15	Ganderbal	83.37%	Farooq Abdullah	JKNC	30,255	78.75%	Abdul Khaliq Sofi	Independent	7,446	19.38%	22,809
16	Hazratbal	76.98%	Mohmad Yasin Shah	JKNC	19,167	61.41%	Syed Fayaz Naqashbandi	Independent	7,936	25.43%	11,231
17	Amira Kadal	71.39%	Ghulam Mohi-Ud-Din Shoh	JKNC	19,567	55.35%	Mohammed Yussouf Shoh	Independent	15,278	43.22%	4,289
18	Habba Kadal	60.06%	Piyare Lal Handoo	JKNC	17,240	48.51%	Mushtaq Ahmad	Independent	15,951	44.89%	1,289
19	Zaina Kadal	75.56%	Ali Mohammad Charloo	JKNC	22,820	64.42%	Firdous Atta	Independent	12,243	34.56%	10,577
20	Eidgah	76.63%	Mohammed Shafi Khan	JKNC	26,904	70.41%	Bashir Ahmed	Independent	11,122	29.11%	15,782
21	Zadibal	71.24%	Peer Mohammed Shafi	JKNC	27,316	54.42%	Peer Abdul Rouf	Independent	22,121	44.07%	5,195
22	Nagin	99.89%	Abdul Samad Teli	JKNC	14,093	48.24%	Hakim Mohammed Jawad	Independent	12,510	42.82%	1,583
23	Beerwah	74.12%	Syed Ahmad Syed	JKNC	15,341	47.28%	Ghulam Mohammed Mir	Independent	10,016	30.87%	5,325
24	Khan Sahib	82.21%	Ghulam Mohmad Mir	INC	24,180	70.03%	Ghulam Qadir War	JKNC	4,166	12.07%	20,014
25	Budgam	82.74%	Syed Ghulam Hussain Geelani	JKNC	18,911	44.96%	Mohammed Sultan Bhat	Independent	12,556	29.85%	6,355
26	Chadoora	72.97%	Mir Mustafa	Independent	12,920	40.59%	Abdul Samad Mir	JKNC	11,514	36.17%	1,406
27	Charari Sharief	85.54%	Abdul Rahim Rather	JKNC	25,447	82.94%	Abdul Rashid	Independent	3,062	9.98%	22,385
28	Pulwama	80.99%	Bashir Ahmed Nengroo	JKNC	23,297	59.57%	Mushtaq Ahmed	Independent	14,910	38.12%	8,387
29	Pampore	81.8%	Ghulam Mohi Ud Din	JKNC	22,186	57.33%	Ali Mohammed Lone	Independent	15,383	39.75%	6,803
30	Tral	87.45%	Ghulam Nabi Naik	INC	13,629	35.17%	Mohmad Sultan	Independent	12,274	31.67%	1,355
31	Wachi	83.42%	Nazir Ahmad Wani	JKNC	17,900	49.66%	Mohmad Abdullah	Independent	17,778	49.33%	122
32	Shopian	81.68%	Sheikh Mohammad Mansoor	JKNC	18,083	48.%	Abdul Ahad Thoker	Independent	17,747	47.11%	336
33	Noorabad	82.33%	Abdul Aziz Zargar	INC	27,132	76.51%	Bashir Ahmad Malik	Independent	7,430	20.95%	19,702
34	Devsar	77.85%	Peerzada Ghulam Ahmad	JKNC	17,169	50.49%	Hamid Ulla Rangrez	Independent	14,550	42.79%	2,619
35	Kulgam	79.97%	Haji Abdul Pazak Mir	Independent	15,607	49.95%	Ghulam Nabi Dar	JKNC	12,031	38.5%	3,576
36	Hom Shali Bugh	84.91%	Ghulam Nabi	Independent	20,886	58.22%	Abdul Salam Deva	JKNC	14,180	39.52%	6,706
37	Pahalgam	77.7%	Rafi Ahmad Mir	JKNC	16,257	52.89%	Ghulam Nabi Hagroo	Independent	13,476	43.84%	2,781
38	Srigufwara–Bijbehara	83.06%	Abdul Gani Shah	JKNC	16,818	47.72%	Mohammed Sultan	Independent	16,718	47.44%	100
39	Anantnag	83.8%	Mohammed Syeed Shah	Independent	24,800	73.92%	Mirza Masood Beg	INC	8,095	24.13%	16,705
40	Shangus–Anantnag East	81.38%	Abdul Rashid Dar	JKNC	14,283	43.97%	Jamseed Ghulam Mohammed	Independent	8,237	25.36%	6,046
41	Kokernag	87.95%	Peerzada Mohammad Syed	INC	28,463	80.92%	Mohammed Abdulla Sheikh	Independent	4,778	13.58%	23,685
42	Dooru	74.94%	Mohammed Akbar Ganie	JKNC	13,826	49.6%	Noor Ud Din Shah	Independent	12,594	45.18%	1,232
43	Leh	68.25%	Tsering Samphel	INC	16,142	56.39%	Tokdan Rinpochey	Independent	7,138	24.94%	9,004
44	Kargil	78.64%	Qamar Ali Akhoon	JKNC	35,559	88.93%	Kachoo Mohammed Ali Khan	Independent	4,427	11.07%	31,132
45	Kishtwar	69.85%	Bashir Ahmed Kichloo	JKNC	18,044	67.95%	Man Mohan	BJP	3,309	12.46%	14,735
46	Inderwal	65.5%	Shareef Naiz	INC	27,069	90.78%	Sheikh Ghulam Mohammed	Independent	1,045	3.5%	26,024
47	Bhaderwah (SC)	51.4%	Hari Lal	INC	11,772	54.17%	Gian Chand	LKD	8,333	38.34%	3,439
48	Doda	78.05%	Attaullah Sohrawardi	JKNC	29,232	92.46%	Chuni Lal	LKD	1,395	4.41%	27,837
49	Ramban	66.9%	Bharat Gandhi	INC	14,339	58.32%	Tirth Singh	Independent	8,597	34.97%	5,742
50	Banihal	64.32%	Molvi Abdul Rashid	JKNC	13,949	57.92%	Mohammed Akhter Nizam	Independent	6,056	25.15%	7,893
51	Gulabgarh	72.36%	Haji Buland Khan	JKNC	15,545	48.37%	Abdul Gani	Independent	11,143	34.67%	4,402
52	Reasi	66.58%	Mohammed Ayub Khan	INC	15,545	46.99%	Jagjiwan Lal	Independent	5,762	17.42%	9,783
53	Udhampur	64.93%	Balak Ram	INC	18,847	53.72%	Shiv Charan Gupta	BJP	13,552	38.63%	5,295
54	Chenani	62.86%	Yash Paul Khajuria	INC	15,842	56.01%	Thakur Dass Chanotra	JKNPP	10,462	36.99%	5,380
55	Ramnagar (SC)	51.01%	Chandhu Lal	INC	14,311	58.77%	Girdhari Lal	JKNPP	6,807	27.95%	7,504
56	Samba	70.2%	Parkash Sharma	INC	10,318	27.34%	Hoshiar Singh	Independent	7,407	19.63%	2,911
57	Bari Brahmana (SC)	76.69%	Swaran Lata	INC	14,539	45.51%	Gurnbachan Kumari	Independent	8,466	26.5%	6,073
58	Bishnah (SC)	66.2%	Parma Nand	JKNC	16,319	53.65%	Gian Chand	Independent	6,495	21.35%	9,824
59	Ranbir Singh Pora–Jammu South	77.47%	Ranjit Singh	INC	14,043	37.51%	Thakur Dass	Independent	9,523	25.44%	4,520
60	Jammu Cantonment	68.24%	H. S. Bali	Independent	10,970	26.62%	Trilochan Dutta	INC	10,110	24.54%	860
61	Jammu West (SC)	61.52%	Mangat Ram Sharma	INC	16,204	48.99%	Chander Mohan Sharma	BJP	10,130	30.63%	6,074
62	Jammu East	63.74%	Chaman Lal Gupta	BJP	13,930	49.52%	Ved Parkash	INC	10,697	38.02%	3,233
63	Jandrah Gharota	72.59%	Shiv Dev Singh	INC	13,121	34.56%	Rattan Chand Gandhi	Independent	8,887	23.41%	4,234
64	Marh (SC)	78.5%	Mula Ram	INC	17,162	52.24%	Sat Pal	JKNPP	11,818	35.97%	5,344
65	Akhnoor	79.78%	Govind Ram Sharma	Independent	19,642	59.52%	Dharam Pal	INC	9,202	27.88%	10,440
66	Chhamb	81.06%	Madan Lal	INC	15,527	52.5%	Ram Nath	BJP	10,795	36.5%	4,732
67	Basohli (SC)	61.64%	Jagdish Raj Sapolia	INC	11,322	40.69%	Lal Chand	Independent	10,054	36.14%	1,268
68	Billawar (SC)	60.71%	Swram Singh	INC	17,731	58.99%	Loknath Sangra	BJP	7,143	23.76%	10,588
69	Kathua (SC)	70.08%	Om Parkash	INC	16,805	49.61%	Kulbhushan Kumar	BJP	10,175	30.04%	6,630
70	Hiranagar	71.97%	Baldev Singh	BJP	17,088	45.17%	Ram Das Dogra	INC	14,580	38.54%	2,508
71	Nowshera	68.54%	Beli Ram	INC	24,053	60.51%	Balwant Singh	Independent	5,808	14.61%	18,245
72	Darhal	75.78%	Chowdhary Mohmmad Hussain	JKNC	28,707	64.34%	Mohammed Sadiq Malik	Independent	13,496	30.25%	15,211
73	Rajouri	82.74%	Mirsa Abdul Rashid	INC	33,443	72.02%	Chowdhary Talib Hussain	Independent	10,648	22.93%	22,795
74	Surankote	80.35%	Aslam Chowdhary Mohammad	INC	26,394	68.81%	Mohammed Ayub Shabnam	Independent	11,677	30.44%	14,717
75	Mendhar (SC)	80.64%	Nisar Ahamed Khan	JKNC	19,820	52.46%	Lal Mohammed Sabir	Independent	16,049	42.48%	3,771
76	Haveli	67.84%	Chaudhry Bashir Ahmed	Independent	19,103	56.22%	Ghulam Ahmed Ganai	JKNC	14,384	42.33%	4,719

== Electoral malpractice ==
India Today reported that "starting about two weeks before the election, 600 opposition workers were arrested in areas where the MUF, independents, and PC [People's Conference] candidates were showing strength".

In the Amira Kadal constituency of Srinagar, MUF's Syed Mohammed Yusuf Shah was a candidate. As the vote-counting began, it was becoming clear that Yusuf Shah was winning by a landslide. His opponent, Ghulam Mohiuddin Shah, went home dejected. But he was summoned back by the electoral officials and declared the winner. When the crowds protested, the police arrived and arrested Yusuf Shah and his supporters. They were held in custody till the end of 1987.

Leader of the People's Conference party, Abdul Ghani Lone, complained that vote counting in the constituency of Handwara was tampered with by the deputy inspector-general of police, A.M. Watali. There were several cases like this with other candidates but the petitions to the courts did not lead to any action. There was no response from the central government, courts, or the election commission to the demands that the allegations of rigging be investigated. Kashmir's High Court chose not to probe the allegations and the Election Commission was inactive at the time.

Balraj Puri has noted three constituencies where the MUF lost narrowly: Bijbehara, Wachi, and Shopian. The number of rejected votes in these constituencies was far higher than the margin of victory for the alliance, indicating that the vote-counting could have been easily manipulated.

Whereas it took only three hours to count the votes in Farooq Abdullah's seat, the vote-counting in seats where the MUF had influence took considerably longer. In Anantnag, it was reported that the results were delayed for two and a half days while the polling station was surrounded by hundreds of policemen. In Bijbehara the polling officers refused to count when they found that a MUF candidate had taken an early lead. In Doru, an NC candidate with a lead of 300 votes was declared the winner even though more than a thousand votes remained to be counted. Counting in the Pulwama constituency took no account of the strategic Tahab belt. Counting in Shopian and Sopore went on for three days.

BBC quoted a Kashmiri politician Khem Lata Wakhloo (Note: Khem Lata Wakhloo was one of the 12 legislators of the National Conference that defected to the G. M. Shah's faction in 1984. Her political affiliation in 1987 is uncertain but Sumantra Bose believes she was still part of the National Conference at that time.) in 2002, remembering that there was widespread rigging in Kashmir and that losing candidates were declared winners. She said that it damaged the people's faith in the elections.

Governor Jagmohan is reported to have been appalled at what was being done, but he said that he was ordered by the central government in Delhi not to interfere.

Many see this rigged election as a cause of militancy in Kashmir. Abdul Ghani Lone became a separatist leader after the 1987 election and stated that many young people, out of frustration with the democratic process, decided to go for an armed struggle.

=== Extent of electoral malpractice ===
The extent of election malpractice has been debated by scholars and analysts.

Scholar Victoria Schofield has stated that the MUF might have won four more seats if there was no electoral fraud. On the other hand, an anonymous source in the Intelligence Bureau has advanced the estimate that the MUF may have lost approximately 13 seats due to electoral malpractice. Other journalists and commentators have estimated a loss of fifteen to twenty seats. Farooq Abdullah conceded that the opposition parties might have been able to win 20 seats instead of 10 in the absence of rigging. He denied his own involvement in the rigging.

Former Kashmir civil servant Wajahat Habibullah states that clear indications of malpractice were found in ten constituencies. These constituencies were mainly in Srinagar and all of them were counted as wins of the National Conference. He believes that Farooq Abdullah allowed them to be rigged to gain a majority for the National Conference in the Assembly so that it would not be dependent on support from the Indian National Congress. He also notes that the methods of rigging appeared "blatant" and lacked the finesse of the pre-1977 elections.

== Aftermath ==
Farooq Abdullah was elected Chief Minister and formed a coalition government. However, the Government lacked legitimacy in the eyes of the people in the Valley. Rebels branded the election as a "thoroughly made one". The Valley sank into a "morass of frustration and radicalisation", states scholar Sumantra Bose. In June 1988, there were protests against a hike in the electricity tariffs, resulting in police firings. In July, the Jammu and Kashmir Liberation Front launched its first bomb attack in Srinagar. A cycle of violence and protests took hold, steadily rising in tempo. In January 1990, the Union Government appointed Jagmohan as the governor of the state. Farooq Abdullah resigned in protest, and Governor's Rule was declared.

== See also ==
- Insurgency in Jammu and Kashmir
- Kashmir conflict

== Bibliography ==
- Bose, Sumantra (2003), Kashmir: Roots of Conflict, Paths to Peace, Harvard University Press, ISBN 0-674-01173-2
- Bose, Sumantra (2013), Transforming India, Harvard University Press, ISBN 9780674728196
- Das Gupta, J. B. (2002), Islamic Fundamentalism and India, Gurgaon: Hope India Publications (for Maulana Abul Kalam Azad Institute of Asian Studies), ISBN 978-1-61820-159-1
- Grover, Verinder; Arora, Ranjana, eds. (1996). Encyclopaedia of India and Her States: Himachal Pradesh, Jammu & Kashmir and Punjab. Deep & Deep. ISBN 978-81-7100-723-3.
- Guha, Ramachandra (2008), India after Gandhi: The History of the World's Largest Democracy, Pan Macmillan, ISBN 978-0330396110
- Habibullah, Wajahat (2008), My Kashmir: Conflict and the Prospects for Enduring Peace, Washington DC: United States Institute for Peace Press, ISBN 978-1-60127-031-3
- Puri, Balraj (30 May 1987), "Fundamentalism in Kashmir, Fragmentation in Jammu", Economic and Political Weekly, 22 (22): 835–837, JSTOR 4377036
- Schofield, Victoria (2003) [First published in 2000], Kashmir in Conflict, London and New York: I. B. Taurus & Co, ISBN 1860648983
- Wani, Aijaz Ashraf (2019), What Happened to Governance in Kashmir?, OUP India, ISBN 978-0-19-909715-9
- Widmalm, Sten (November 1997), "The Rise and Fall of Democracy in Jammu and Kashmir", Asian Survey, 37 (11): 1005–1030, doi:10.2307/2645738, JSTOR 2645738
- Widmalm, Sten (2002), Kashmir in Comparative Perspective: Democracy and Violent Separatism in India, Psychology Press, ISBN 978-0-7007-1578-7
