= Ghulam Qadir Wani (politician, born 1926) =

Kashmiri politician

Ghulam Qadir Wani Niloora
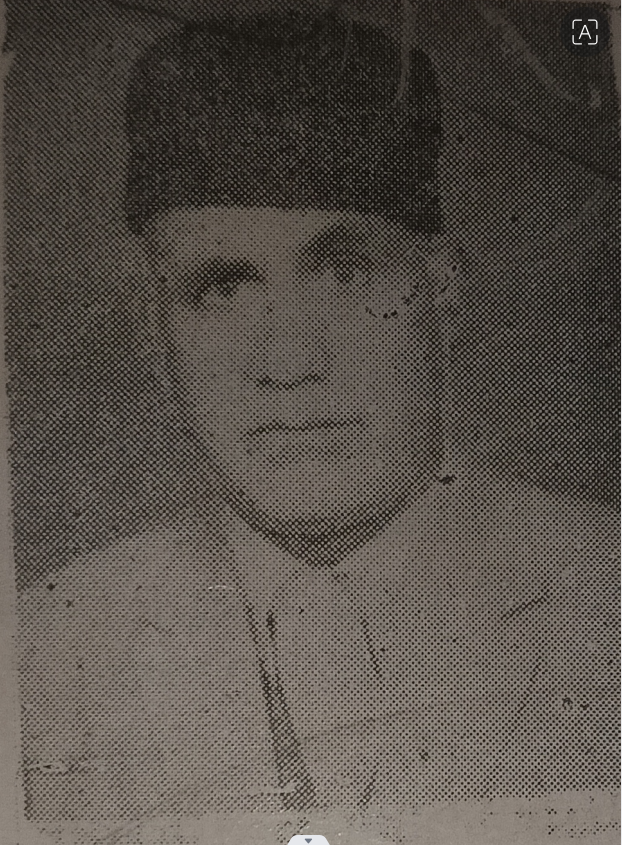
- Ghulam Qadir Wani Niloora

Member of the Jammu and Kashmir Legislative Assembly
- In office 1977–1987
- Constituency: Wachi Assembly constituency

Personal details
- Born: 1926 Niloora, Pulwama, Jammu and Kashmir, British India
- Died: 1991 (aged 64–65) Jammu and Kashmir, India
- Party: Jammu & Kashmir National Conference
- Occupation: Politician

Ghulam Qadir Wani Niloora (1926–1991) was an Indian politician from the Pulwama district of Jammu and Kashmir. He was a two-time elected member of the Jammu and Kashmir Legislative Assembly, representing the Wachi Assembly constituency as a member of the Jammu & Kashmir National Conference.

== Early life ==
Wani was born in 1926 in Niloora, a village in the Pulwama district of Jammu and Kashmir. He completed his education up to the matriculation level before becoming involved in political and social activities in his native region.

== Political career ==
Wani began participating in regional politics at an early age and became associated with the Jammu & Kashmir National Conference. He gained recognition for his grassroots involvement in the political affairs of South Kashmir during a politically turbulent period in the region’s history.

In the 1977 state elections, Wani contested from the Wachi Assembly constituency and defeated Bashir Ahmed Magrey of the Indian National Congress by a margin of 13,518 votes (54.30%).

He was re-elected in the 1983 elections, defeating Ghulam Qadir of the Indian National Congress by a margin of 9,884 votes (34.03%).

== Death ==
Ghulam Qadir Wani was assassinated in 1991 by unidentified gunmen amid the political unrest and insurgency in Jammu and Kashmir. His death was reported as a significant loss to local political activism in South Kashmir.
