= 1977 Jammu and Kashmir Legislative Assembly election =

Elections

- 9 July 1977

all 76 seats in Legislative Assembly 39 seats needed for a majority
- Turnout: 67.2%
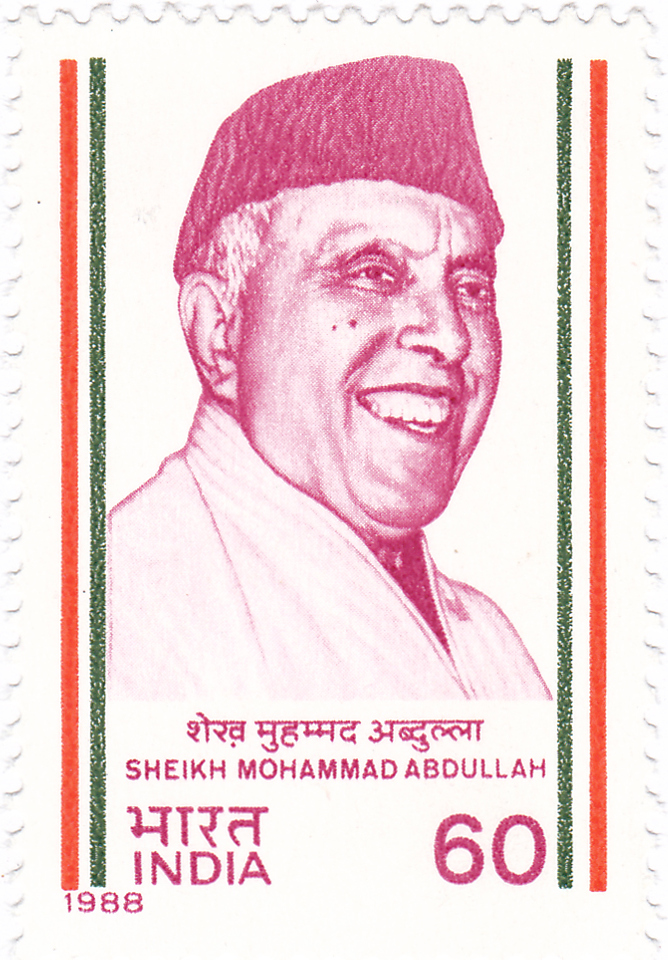

	First party	Second party
		JP
Leader	Sheikh Abdullah
Party	JKNC	JP
Last election	-	-
Seats won	47	13
Seat change	▲47	▲13
	Third party	Fourth party
Party	INC (R)	Jamaat-e-Islami
Last election	58
Seats won	11	1
Seat change	▼46	▼4
Chief Minister before election
Sheikh Abdullah
JKNC
Elected Chief Minister
Sheikh Abdullah
JKNC

Elections for the Indian state of Jammu and Kashmir were held over June 1977, which are generally regarded as the first 'free and fair' elections in the state. Jammu & Kashmir National Conference, newly revived from the former Plebiscite Front, won an overwhelming majority and re-elected Sheikh Abdullah as the Chief Minister. The Janata Party won 13 seats and emerged as the second largest party.

== Background ==
After reaching the 1974 Indira-Sheikh accord, Sheikh Abdullah was elected as the Chief Minister of Jammu and Kashmir by the ruling Indian National Congress party in the state legislature (which had in fact been the original National Conference founded by Abdullah in 1930s but merged into Congress before the 1967 elections). Abdullah remained in power during the National Emergency imposed by Indira Gandhi in 1975. After the Emergency was lifted, the Janata Party came to power in the Centre in the 1977 general election.

Elections were called for the state Legislative Assembly in June 1977. Sheikh Abdullah now revived the National Conference from the erstwhile Plebiscite Front. The National Conference and Congress met head-on as equals, the first time such an electoral contest occurred since the State's Accession in 1947. The Prime Minister Morarji Desai (of the Janata Party) took steps to strengthen security in the state and declared that any rigging would be severely punished. This had a 'salutary effect' in the political atmosphere in the state witnessing its first 'free and fair' election.

The revival of the National Conference was greeted with great enthusiasm in the Kashmir Valley. In the words of Kashmiri, "the entire valley was red with N. C. flags. Every house and every market stood decorated with bunting."

== Results ==
The National Conference won the majority in the Assembly with 47 of the 76 seats. Whereas it won 40 of the 42 seats in the Kashmir Valley, it was able to win only 7 seats out of 32 in the Jammu province.

The Indian National Congress (former National Conference, which had been in power since the State's accession) was reduced to third place, winning 11 seats in Jammu and none in the Valley.

The Janata Party (which had incorporated the former Jammu Praja Parishad) won 13 seats, its best performance so far. In addition to 11 seats in Jammu, it won 2 seats in the Valley for the first time.

Also significant is the fact that Jamaat-e-Islami won only one seat, down from 5 seats in the previous Assembly.

Party	Votes	%	Seats	+/–
Jammu & Kashmir National Conference	807,166	46.22	47	0
Janata Party	414,259	23.72	13	New
Indian National Congress (R)	294,911	16.89	11	▼47
Jamaat-e-Islami Kashmir	62,654	3.59	1	▼4
Others	1,903	0.11	0	0
Independents	165,477	9.48	4	▲1
Total	1,746,370	100.00	76	▲1
Valid votes	1,746,370	96.80		
Invalid/blank votes	57,734	3.20		
Total votes	1,804,104	100.00		
Registered voters/turnout	2,684,992	67.19		
Source: ECI

== Results by constituency ==
Winner, runner-up, voter turnout, and victory margin in every constituency
Assembly Constituency		Turnout	Winner				Runner Up				Margin
#k	Names	%	Candidate	Party	Votes	%	Candidate	Party	Votes	%	Margin
1	Karnah	67.94%	Ghulam Qadir Mir	JKNC	12,357	46.31%	Mohammed Yunis Khan	INC	7,641	28.64%	4,716
2	Handwara	83.41%	Abdul Ghani Lone	JP	17,021	51.78%	Sharif Ud Din	JKNC	14,702	44.73%	2,319
3	Langate	74.63%	Mohammad Sultan Ganai	JKNC	11,976	50.04%	Abdul Gani Mir	Independent	3,657	15.28%	8,319
4	Kupwara	62.7%	Assad Ullah Shah	JKNC	13,780	56.41%	Ghulam Nabi	JP	4,834	19.79%	8,946
5	Bandipora	68.45%	Mohammad Khalil Naik	JKNC	18,032	70.94%	Mohammed Anwar Khan	INC	2,299	9.04%	15,733
6	Sonawari	84.98%	Abdul Aziz Parray	JKNC	21,074	67.99%	Mohammad Akbar Lone	JP	9,923	32.01%	11,151
7	Pattan	87.37%	Abdul Rashid Shaheen	JKNC	15,738	53.99%	Iftikhar Hussain Ansari	JP	12,734	43.69%	3,004
8	Gulmarg	40.85%	Mohmad Akbar Lone	JKNC	15,700	78.59%	Mirza Ghulam Ahmad Beg	JP	2,334	11.68%	13,366
9	Sangrama	73.88%	Ghulam Rasool	JKNC	13,609	70.69%	Sharif Ud Din	JP	2,106	10.94%	11,503
10	Sopore	85.9%	Syed Ali Shah Geelani	JI	16,717	49.14%	Hakeem Habibullah	JKNC	16,684	49.04%	33
11	Rafiabad	72.21%	Mohammad Dilawar Mir	JKNC	14,696	68.52%	Ghulam Rasool Kar	INC	3,517	16.4%	11,179
12	Baramulla	66.78%	Ghulam Ud-Din Shah	JKNC	11,509	55.64%	Ghulam Meha Safi	JI	4,472	21.62%	7,037
13	Uri	68.17%	Mohammad Shafi	JKNC	11,921	65.56%	Mohammed Mazaffar Khan	INC	3,309	18.2%	8,612
14	Kangan	76.12%	Mian Bashir Ahmed	JKNC	20,808	87.07%	Mohammed Afzi	JP	3,090	12.93%	17,718
15	Ganderbal	87.27%	Sheikh Abdullah	JKNC	26,162	88.17%	Ali Mohamd Taria	Independent	3,509	11.83%	22,653
16	Hazratbal	82.59%	Hissa Ud Din	JKNC	23,032	80.74%	Mohammed Iliyas	JP	5,081	17.81%	17,951
17	Amira Kadal	74.54%	Ghulam Mohi-Ud-Din Shoh	JKNC	14,515	57.74%	Ghulam Mohi-Ud-Din Wani	JP	10,340	41.13%	4,175
18	Habba Kadal	70.62%	Ghulam Mohammed Butt	JKNC	16,356	47.53%	Jag Mohini	JP	14,084	40.92%	2,272
19	Zaina Kadal	85.39%	Molvi Mohammed Yasin Hamdani	JKNC	23,414	61.79%	Sheikh Ali Mohammad	JP	14,476	38.21%	8,938
20	Eidgah	80.77%	Abdul Rashid Kabuli	JP	18,255	52.83%	Ghulam Rasool Rashi	JKNC	16,298	47.17%	1,957
21	Zadibal	81.71%	Ghulam Ahmad Shunthoo	JKNC	23,401	51.55%	Salin Anwar Dhar	JP	21,522	47.41%	1,879
22	Nagin	78.58%	Abdul Samad Teli	JKNC	13,856	61.51%	Ghulam Mohmad Bawan	JP	8,397	37.28%	5,459
23	Beerwah	72.91%	Ahmad Saeed	JKNC	14,918	60.73%	Syed Ali Shah	JP	7,737	31.5%	7,181
24	Khan Sahib	66.42%	Hakeem Mohammad Yaseen Shah	JKNC	15,647	73.94%	Ghulam Qadir War	JP	3,814	18.02%	11,833
25	Budgam	84.54%	Syed Ghulam Hussain Geelani	JKNC	14,324	49.83%	Aga Sayeed Hassan	JP	11,799	41.05%	2,525
26	Chadoora	77.67%	Abdul Samad Mir	JKNC	13,103	64.86%	Mir Mustafa	INC	4,699	23.26%	8,404
27	Charari Sharief	71.84%	Abdul Rahim Rather	JKNC	14,766	71.96%	Abdul Qayoom	INC	4,764	23.22%	10,002
28	Pulwama	73.27%	Mohammad Ibrahim Dar	JKNC	18,712	72.58%	Abdul Kashid Wani	JI	2,537	9.84%	16,175
29	Pampore	83.36%	Mohiuddin Malik	JKNC	22,877	82.11%	Peer Ghulam Hassan Masoodi	JP	2,409	8.65%	20,468
30	Tral	84.72%	Mohammed Subhan Bhat	JKNC	13,315	46.05%	Ali Muhammad Naik	Independent	11,859	41.02%	1,456
31	Wachi	78.31%	Ghulam Qadir Wani	JKNC	16,690	67.04%	Bashir Ahmed Magrey	INC	3,172	12.74%	13,518
32	Shopian	73.06%	Sheikh Mohammad Mansoor	JKNC	15,133	59.34%	Hakim Ghulam Nabi	JI	4,763	18.68%	10,370
33	Noorabad	71.74%	Wali Mohammad Itoo	JKNC	12,407	58.76%	Abdul Aziz Zargar	INC	5,589	26.47%	6,818
34	Devsar	79.38%	Ghulam Nabi Kochak	JKNC	14,921	59.95%	Manohar Nath Kaul	INC	4,623	18.58%	10,298
35	Kulgam	74.92%	Ghulam Nabi Dar	JKNC	8,833	42.63%	Abdul Razak Mir	JI	6,403	30.91%	2,430
36	Hom Shali Bugh	81.79%	Abdul Salam Deva	JKNC	12,959	56.77%	Ali Mohammed Dar	JI	5,897	25.83%	7,062
37	Pahalgam	77.13%	Piyare Lal Handoo	JKNC	14,764	68.78%	Ghulam Rasool Kochah	JP	4,283	19.95%	10,481
38	Srigufwara–Bijbehara	84.62%	Abdul Gani Shah	JKNC	16,059	63.92%	Mufti Mohammed Sayeed	INC	8,081	32.16%	7,978
39	Anantnag	88.35%	Mirza Mohammed Afzal Beg	JKNC	15,893	63.13%	Sheikh Abdul Majid	JP	9,283	36.87%	6,610
40	Shangus–Anantnag East	77.62%	Mohammed Ashraf Khan	JKNC	15,568	70.21%	Mohammed Maqbool	INC	4,162	18.77%	11,406
41	Kokernag	74.91%	Malik Ghulam Ud Din	JKNC	14,854	65.52%	Peer Hissam Ud Din	INC	5,339	23.55%	9,515
42	Dooru	74.25%	Haji Abdul Gani Khan	JKNC	10,817	51.44%	Sneer Aki Boda	INC	5,472	26.02%	5,345
43	Leh	64.79%	Sonam Narboo	INC	11,736	61.17%	Soham Gyaltsan	JP	7,450	38.83%	4,286
44	Kargil	72.87%	Munshi Habibullah	JKNC	13,549	54.42%	Kachoo Mohammed Ali Khan	INC	11,021	44.27%	2,528
45	Kishtwar	51.1%	Bashir Ahmed Kichloo	JKNC	3,910	27.15%	Ghulam Hussain Arman	JP	3,385	23.51%	525
46	Inderwal	37.1%	Sheikh Ghulam Mohammed	JKNC	5,296	44.38%	Abdul Ghani Goni	JP	2,530	21.2%	2,766
47	Bhaderwah	36.34%	Narain Dass	JP	4,535	40.96%	Thakur Dass	JKNC	3,745	33.82%	790
48	Doda	48.42%	Ghulam Qadir Wani	JP	5,342	39.02%	Attaullah Sohrawardi	JKNC	4,384	32.02%	958
49	Ramban	45.72%	Prem Nath	JKNC	3,472	28.64%	Labhu Ram	Independent	3,035	25.03%	437
50	Banihal	52.67%	Molvi Abdul Rashid	JKNC	7,460	51.83%	Modh. Akthar Nizami	INC	3,290	22.86%	4,170
51	Gulabgarh	47.6%	Haji Buland Khan	JKNC	8,723	58.15%	Mohammed Ayub Khan	INC	3,203	21.35%	5,520
52	Reasi	54.7%	Rishi Kumar Kaushal	JP	9,931	52.84%	Raghunath Das	JKNC	2,699	14.36%	7,232
53	Udhampur	53.2%	Shiv Charan Gupta	Independent	9,363	44.14%	Faqir Chand	INC	8,763	41.31%	600
54	Chenani	44.98%	Bhim Singh	INC	7,674	52.43%	Ishar Dass	JP	4,005	27.36%	3,669
55	Ramnagar	38.08%	Prithvi Chand	JP	7,300	53.19%	Ram Dass	INC	4,071	29.66%	3,229
56	Samba	62.22%	Dhayan Singh	Independent	6,349	25.61%	Harbans Singh	INC	4,728	19.07%	1,621
57	Bari Brahmana	59.58%	Gurnbachan Kumari	JP	8,124	39.21%	Gouri Shankar	INC	7,521	36.3%	603
58	Bishnah	62.31%	Parma Nand	INC	9,441	43.17%	Ram Chand	JP	7,357	33.64%	2,084
59	Ranbir Singh Pora–Jammu South	74.38%	Janak Raj Gupta	INC	12,603	48.46%	Rangil Singh	JP	7,166	27.55%	5,437
60	Jammu Cantonment	55.35%	Parduman Singh	INC	5,600	28.6%	Ved Bhasin	JP	5,426	27.71%	174
61	Jammu West	53.73%	Harbans Lal Bhagotra	JP	10,956	54.76%	Romesh Chander	INC	7,599	37.98%	3,357
62	Jammu East	52.99%	Ram Nath Bhalgotra	JP	13,179	61.78%	Amrit Kumar Malhotra	INC	5,141	24.1%	8,038
63	Jandrah Gharota	61.07%	Dhan Raj Bargotra	JP	8,550	38.08%	Ranjit Singh	INC	6,112	27.22%	2,438
64	Marh	54.6%	Tulsi Ram	JP	5,527	32.96%	Sushil Kumar	INC	4,553	27.15%	974
65	Akhnoor	70.63%	Dharam Pal	INC	8,635	37.67%	Govind Ram Sharma	Independent	4,517	19.7%	4,118
66	Chhamb	74.39%	Ram Nath	Independent	9,352	38.52%	Dewan Singh	INC	4,106	16.91%	5,246
67	Basohli	45.32%	Mangat Ram Sharma	INC	4,829	29.96%	Uttam Chand	Independent	3,885	24.1%	944
68	Billawar	54.25%	Dhian Singh	JP	12,328	57.57%	Thakur Randhir Singh	INC	6,258	29.23%	6,070
69	Kathua	60.96%	Dhain Chand	JP	10,022	44.9%	Punjabu Ram Alias Punjab Singh	INC	9,023	40.43%	999
70	Hiranagar	69.54%	Girdhari Lal Dogra	INC	13,623	50.39%	Rattan Lal	JP	9,912	36.66%	3,711
71	Nowshera	60.01%	Beli Ram	INC	7,832	30.89%	Rattan Singh	Independent	7,416	29.25%	416
72	Darhal	46.9%	Chowdhary Mohmmad Hussain	JKNC	11,433	57.94%	Abdul Rashid Mirza	INC	4,717	23.91%	6,716
73	Rajouri	59.62%	Talib Hussain	INC	9,390	39.98%	Mohammed Sharif	JKNC	7,365	31.36%	2,025
74	Surankote	68.84%	Aslam Chowdhary Mohammad	INC	11,608	52.37%	Mohammed Syed Beg	JKNC	9,346	42.16%	2,262
75	Mendhar	65.23%	Rafiq Hissain Khan	Independent	6,556	30.96%	Mohammed Sadiq	JKNC	6,479	30.59%	77
76	Haveli	48.26%	Ghulam Ahmed	JKNC	8,915	51.31%	Lal Hussain Mustaq	JP	4,616	26.57%	4,299

== Government formation ==
Sheikh Abdullah was sworn in as the Chief Minister of the State following the election. Mirza Afzal Beg was sworn in as the Deputy Chief Minister of Jammu and Kashmir .

By the end of the 1970s, the seventy-year-old Sheikh Abdullah anointed his son Farooq Abdullah as his successor. Following Sheikh's death in 1982, Farooq Abdullah was appointed as the Chief Minister. The National Conference government completed a full five-year term.

Before his death, Sheikh Abdullah initiated a controversial 'Grant of Permit for Resettlement' bill in the State's Legislative Assembly. As per the bill, any state subject of Jammu and Kashmir before 14 May 1954 or any of his descendants could apply for resettlement in the State provided they swore allegiance to both the Indian Constitution and the Constitution of the State. The bill was passed by the Legislative Assembly after Sheikh's death, but it aroused fears among the Hindus of Jammu that Pakistani sympathizers and agents could cross into the State and create tensions. The Central government forced Farooq Abdullah to refer the bill to the Supreme Court of India where it has been put into cold storage.

== Commentary ==
All the elections held in Jammu and Kashmir before 1977 were plagued with corrupt electoral practices. The elections of 1977 represented a 'democratic breakthrough', according to scholar Steve Widmalm. Politician Bhim Singh stated, 'Morarji Desai openly declared that anyone who would attempt to pursue some form of rigging would be severely punished, and this was quite effective'. The Congress party in the Central Government has therefore been regarded as an obstacle to the State's democratic functioning. The party regarded Jammu and Kashmir to be a sensitive border state, which was not 'ready for democracy'. Building Indian nationalism was considered far more important. Activist Balraj Puri has disagreed with the sentiment. In his view, democratic functioning was indeed a prerequisite to integration and national unity. As a result of the democratization process, he has asserted that there were ten years of peace with 'no fundamentalism, no secessionism, and no communalism'. JKLF's Amanullah Khan has also endorsed the assessment. The observers he sent to the Kashmir Valley during the early 1980s reported that the situation was not conducive to inciting a rebellion. Journalist Tavleen Singh who covered the subsequent Assembly election in 1983 asked people wherever she went whether they regarded the plebiscite as an issue. 'Almost everywhere the answer was an emphatic no. People said that the past was dead and they were participating in this election as Indians,' she recounted.

== Bibliography ==
- Bose, Sumantra (2003), Kashmir: Roots of Conflict, Paths to Peace, Harvard University Press, ISBN 0-674-01173-2
- Guha, Ramachandra (2008), India after Gandhi: The History of the World's Largest Democracy, Pan Macmillan, ISBN 978-0330396110
- Schofield, Victoria (2003) [First published in 2000], Kashmir in Conflict, London and New York: I. B. Taurus & Co, ISBN 1860648983
- Widmalm, Sten (November 1997), "The Rise and Fall of Democracy in Jammu and Kashmir", Asian Survey, 37 (11): 1005–1030, doi:10.2307/2645738, JSTOR 2645738
- Widmalm, Sten (2002), Kashmir in Comparative Perspective: Democracy and Violent Separatism in India, Psychology Press, ISBN 978-0-7007-1578-7
