= Muzaffar Hussain Baig =

Indian politician and former deputy chief minister of Jammu and Kashmir

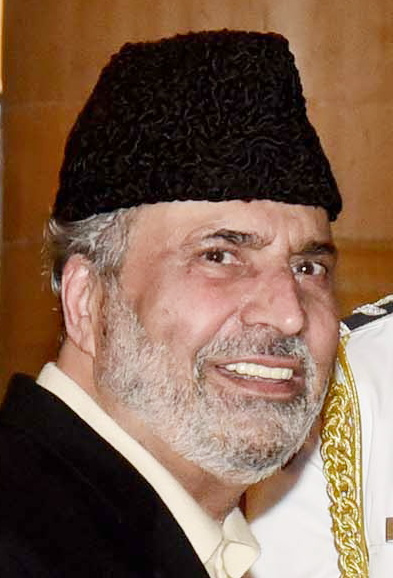
- Baig in 2020

Member of Parliament, Lok Sabha
- In office 1 September 2014 – 23 May 2019
- Preceded by: Sharifuddin Shariq
- Succeeded by: Mohammad Akbar Lone
- Constituency: Baramulla

Deputy Chief Minister of Jammu and Kashmir state
- In office 2 November 2005 – 11 July 2008
- Preceded by: Mangat Ram Sharma
- Succeeded by: Tara Chand
- Constituency: Baramulla

Chief-Patron of JKPDP
- In office December 11, 2018 – November 14, 2020
- President: Mehbooba Mufti
- Succeeded by: position abolished

Personal details
- Born: 8 May 1946 (age 80) Wahdina, Jammu and Kashmir, British India
- Other political affiliations: Jammu and Kashmir People's Democratic Party (Founding Member)
- Spouse: Safina Baig
- Children: Daima; Dalyah
- Education: Harvard Law School
- Occupation: Advocate General, Politician
- Awards: Padma Bhushan (2020)
- As of 20 June, 2021

Muzaffar Hussain Baig is an Indian politician from Kashmir. He was the former Deputy Chief Minister of the Indian state of Jammu and Kashmir. On Republic Day of 2020 he received India's third highest civilian honour Padma Bhushan.

Baig was the founding member of Jammu and Kashmir People's Democratic Party led by Mufti Mohammad Sayeed and was named as Patron of the party post-Mufti's death in 2016.

== Early life ==
He was born in Wahidna, a small hilly village in Baramulla district of the Kashmir Valley. He received his master's degree from Harvard Law School.

== Career ==
He started his political career in 1996 with the Jammu and Kashmir People's Conference where he held the position of Vice-Chairman. In 2002, he fought the Legislative Assembly election with the Jammu and Kashmir People's Democratic Party and won from Baramulla constituency. He was reelected in 2008. He held the position of Law Minister and Parliamentary Affairs Minister in the state cabinet for the period 2002–2006. Until 2006 he was Deputy Chief Minister of Jammu and Kashmir.

He served as Chief Spokesperson for the Jammu and Kashmir People's Democratic Party. He also worked in law firms in the United States and New Delhi in India. Baig served as Advocate General of the state of Jammu and Kashmir from 1987 to 1989.

Baig was elected to the Lok Sabha in 2014 from Baramulla.

Due to differences between him and Mehbooba Mufti, that grew after the abrogation of Article 370, It was being allegedly said that Baig joined Sajjad Lone's Jammu and Kashmir People's Conference, Peoples Conference disowns senior leader Muzaffar Hussain Baig. Party general secretary Imran Ansari said Baig never joined JKPC.

== Electoral performance ==
Election	Constituency	Party	Result	Votes %	Opposition Candidate	Opposition Party	Opposition vote %	Ref
2024	Baramulla	Independent	Lost	8.54%	Javid Hassan Baig	JKNC	32.75%	
2008	Baramulla	JKPDP	Won	53.46%	Nazir Hussain Khan	JKNC	31.29%	
2002	Baramulla	JKPDP	Won	38.62%	Ghulam Nabi Kachru	JKNC	22.52%	
1983	Baramulla	JKNC	Lost	18.97%	Sheik Mohammed Maqbool	JKNC	36.05%	

== Awards ==
In 2020, Baig was conferred the Padma Bhushan award, the third-highest civilian honor of India.
