= 1983 Jammu and Kashmir Legislative Assembly election =

Indian state election

- 17 November 1983 to 24 November 1983

all 75 seats in Legislative Assembly 38 seats needed for a majority
- Turnout: 73.2%
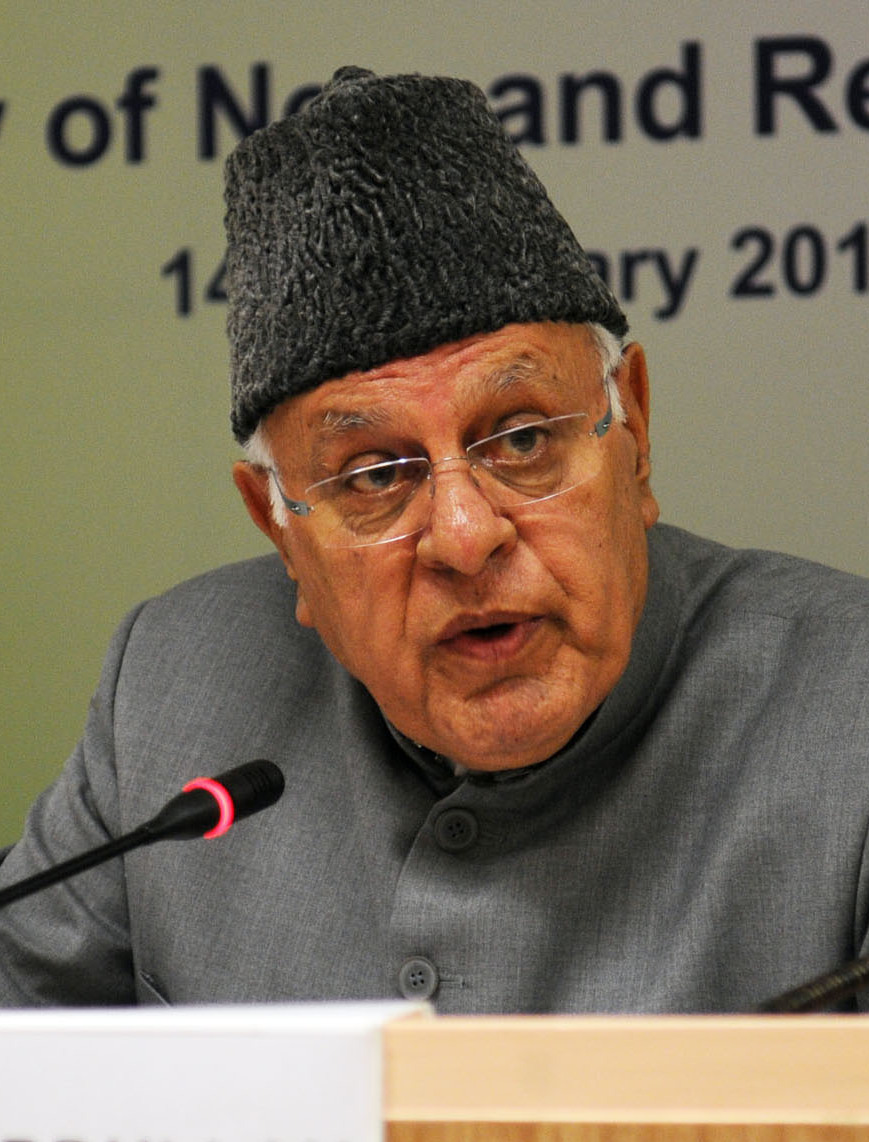

	First party	Second party
Leader	Farooq Abdullah
Party	JKNC	INC
Last election	47	11
Seats won	46	26
Seat change	▼1	▲15
	Third party	Fourth party
Party	BJP	JKPC
Last election	new party	new
Seats won	0	1
Seat change	Steady	-
Chief Minister before election
Farooq Abdullah
JKNC
Elected Chief Minister
Farooq Abdullah
JKNC

Elections for the Indian state of Jammu and Kashmir were held over October 1983. The Jammu & Kashmir National Conference leader Farooq Abdullah was appointed Chief Minister.

== Background ==
The 1983 Jammu and Kashmir elections cemented the political polarisation on religious lines after Indira Gandhi campaigned aggressively in the state, raising the bogey of a 'Muslim invasion' of the Jammu region, alluding to the Resettlement Bill passed by the-then National Conference government, which gave the state's residents who left for Pakistan before 1954 the right to return to the state, reclaim their properties, and resettle.

== Result ==
Indira Gandhi's strategy yielded dividends in the 1983 state elections and the Congress won 26 seats, while the NC secured 46. Barring an odd constituency, all the victories of the Congress were in the Jammu and Ladakh regions, while National Conference swept the Kashmir Valley. The 1983 election established the model for any future Congress-NC alliance - the Congress allotting itself seats mainly in the Jammu and Ladakh regions, while the National Conference limiting itself to the Kashmir Valley.

Farooq Abdullah was sworn in as the Chief Minister Again.

Party	Votes	%	Seats	+/–
Jammu & Kashmir National Conference	1,039,064	45.85	46	▼1
Indian National Congress	666,112	29.39	26	▲15
Jammu and Kashmir People's Conference	100,622	4.44	1	New
Bharatiya Janata Party	69,102	3.05	0	New
Others	170,415	7.52	0	0
Independents	220,904	9.75	2	▼2
Total	2,266,219	100.00	75	▼1
Valid votes	2,266,219	96.81		
Invalid/blank votes	74,692	3.19		
Total votes	2,340,911	100.00		
Registered voters/turnout	3,101,665	75.47		
Source: ECI

== Results by constituency ==
Winner, runner-up, voter turnout, and victory margin in every constituency
Assembly Constituency		Turnout	Winner				Runner Up				Margin
#k	Names	%	Candidate	Party	Votes	%	Candidate	Party	Votes	%	Margin
1	Karnah	74.68%	Abdul Gani Lone	Jammu & Kashmir People’s Conference	15,407	45.%	Ghulam Qadir Mir	JKNC	12,194	35.61%	3,213
2	Handwara	76.85%	Chowdary Mohammed Ramzan	JKNC	17,575	45.48%	Abdul Ghani Lone	Jammu & Kashmir People’s Conference	17,565	45.46%	10
3	Langate	76.77%	Abdul Ahad Wani	JKNC	10,954	44.29%	Ghulam Nabi	Jammu & Kashmir People’s Conference	4,637	18.75%	6,317
4	Kupwara	64.57%	Peer Abdul Gani	JKNC	13,119	48.27%	Abdul Haq Khan	Jammu & Kashmir People’s Conference	6,046	22.25%	7,073
5	Bandipora	78.95%	Mohammad Khalil Naik	JKNC	18,253	53.31%	Nizam Uddin Bhat	Jammu & Kashmir People’s Conference	7,380	21.55%	10,873
6	Sonawari	78.47%	Ghulam Rasool Bahar	JKNC	19,245	58.3%	Abdul Aziz Parray	INC	6,813	20.64%	12,432
7	Pattan	78.52%	Iftikhar Hussain Ansari	INC	11,761	39.22%	Abdul Aziz Parrey	JKNC	10,904	36.36%	857
8	Gulmarg	72.53%	Ghulam Hassan Mir	JKNC	14,747	62.53%	Mirza Ghulam Ahmad Beg	INC	4,657	19.75%	10,090
9	Sangrama	78.15%	Ghulam Rasool Bhat	JKNC	13,133	57.26%	Mohammed Maqbool Malik	INC	4,020	17.53%	9,113
10	Sopore	83.57%	Hakeem Habibullah	JKNC	17,048	45.98%	Syed Ali Shah Geelani	JI	12,974	34.99%	4,074
11	Rafiabad	76.88%	Mohammad Dilawar Mir	JKNC	12,976	49.87%	Sheikh Bashir Ali Vakil	JKNC	4,000	15.37%	8,976
12	Baramulla	74.13%	Shiekh Mohammed Maqbol	JKNC	9,812	36.05%	Ghulam Mohammed Safi	JI	6,185	22.72%	3,627
13	Uri	78.08%	Mohammad Shafi	JKNC	15,940	66.73%	Qazi Mohammad	Independent	7,946	33.27%	7,994
14	Kangan	75.51%	Sheikh Abdul Jabar	JKNC	17,696	68.48%	Mohammed Afzal Qazi	INC	5,780	22.37%	11,916
15	Ganderbal	86.32%	Farooq Abdullah	JKNC	32,331	95.81%	Ghulam Mohi Ud Din Saiati	INC	1,235	3.66%	31,096
16	Hazratbal	81.53%	Hissam Ud Din Bandey	JKNC	18,744	69.8%	Sofi Ghulam Ahmed	Independent	4,674	17.41%	14,070
17	Amira Kadal	73.64%	Ghulam Mohi-Ud-Din Shoh	JKNC	25,533	77.42%	Abdul Aziz	INC	6,086	18.45%	19,447
18	Habba Kadal	75.24%	Ghulam Mohammed Butt	JKNC	27,745	69.53%	Piaray Lal Kharihalu	INC	11,462	28.72%	16,283
19	Zaina Kadal	93.47%	Ali Mohammad Charloo	JKNC	38,366	96.94%	Noor Mohammed	Independent	587	1.48%	37,779
20	Eidgah	86.63%	Mubarak Ahmed Gul	JKNC	36,769	93.87%	Ghulam Mohammed Misgar	INC	1,285	3.28%	35,484
21	Zadibal	88.93%	Sheikh Abdul Rashid	JKNC	49,937	88.54%	Jehangir Ali Khan	Independent	4,001	7.09%	45,936
22	Nagin	77.71%	Abdul Samad Teli	JKNC	21,893	67.45%	Ghulam Mohmad Bawan	INC	9,670	29.79%	12,223
23	Beerwah	63.%	Syed Ahmad Syed	JKNC	13,879	61.01%	Abdul Ahad Magray	JKNC	2,903	12.76%	10,976
24	Khan Sahib	70.86%	Hakeem Mohammad Yaseen Shah	JKNC	13,737	58.09%	Ghulam Ahmad Barray	INC	4,557	19.27%	9,180
25	Budgam	75.93%	Syed Ghulam Hussain Geelani	JKNC	17,037	55.67%	Assadullah Mir	INC	8,392	27.42%	8,645
26	Chadoora	72.48%	Abdul Samad Mir	JKNC	13,614	53.81%	Mir Mustafa	Independent	5,736	22.67%	7,878
27	Charari Sharief	79.47%	Abdul Rahim Rather	JKNC	17,678	69.79%	Abdul Qayoom	INC	6,567	25.93%	11,111
28	Pulwama	80.46%	Sana Ullah Dar	JKNC	15,707	51.16%	Mohammed Ayub	INC	5,189	16.9%	10,518
29	Pampore	83.87%	Mohammed Sultan	JKNC	21,672	71.91%	Peerzada Ghulam Jeelani	INC	5,136	17.04%	16,536
30	Tral	88.32%	Ali Muhammad Naik	Independent	21,283	61.05%	Mohammed Subhan Bhat	JKNC	13,578	38.95%	7,705
31	Wachi	81.36%	Ghulam Qadirwani	JKNC	16,314	56.17%	Ghulam Qadir	INC	6,430	22.14%	9,884
32	Shopian	80.69%	Sheikh Mohammad Mansoor	JKNC	14,662	48.01%	Moulana Mohammed Amin	JI	8,805	28.83%	5,857
33	Noorabad	79.97%	Wali Mohammad Itoo	JKNC	15,846	54.36%	Abdul Aziz Zargar	INC	9,548	32.75%	6,298
34	Devsar	81.06%	Ghulam Ahmad Shah	JKNC	15,534	53.68%	Manohar Nath Kaul	INC	9,757	33.72%	5,777
35	Kulgam	79.98%	Ghulam Nabi Dar	JKNC	9,723	38.03%	Sheikh Ghulam Hassan	JI	6,843	26.77%	2,880
36	Hom Shali Bugh	85.01%	Abdul Salam Deva	JKNC	13,752	46.37%	Mufti Mohammed Syed	INC	7,722	26.04%	6,030
37	Pahalgam	80.11%	Piyare Lal Handoo	JKNC	15,654	56.77%	Mohammed Tahir	INC	9,995	36.25%	5,659
38	Srigufwara–Bijbehara	86.09%	Abdul Gani Shah	JKNC	17,303	53.9%	Mufti Mahd. Syed	INC	14,214	44.28%	3,089
39	Anantnag	82.75%	Mirza Mehboob Beg	JKNC	15,575	54.4%	Ghulam Hassan Naik	INC	9,963	34.8%	5,612
40	Shangus–Anantnag East	81.96%	Mohammed Maqbool	INC	14,403	50.84%	Mohammed Ashraf Khan	JKNC	13,042	46.03%	1,361
41	Kokernag	80.2%	Malik Ghulam Ud Din	JKNC	17,112	60.61%	Peer Hissam Ud Din	INC	11,123	39.39%	5,989
42	Dooru	76.27%	Mohammed Akbar Ganie	JKNC	12,854	50.52%	Sher Ali Boda	INC	8,367	32.88%	4,487
43	Leh	67.1%	Sonam Gyalsan	INC	15,404	64.26%	Sonam Wangchuk Narboo	JKNC	8,287	34.57%	7,117
44	Kargil	76.8%	Munshi Habibullah	JKNC	18,729	50.35%	Kachoo Mohammed Ali Khan	INC	18,469	49.65%	260
45	Kishtwar	72.2%	Ghulam Hussain Arman	INC	12,213	51.63%	Bashir Ahmed Kichloo	JKNC	9,004	38.06%	3,209
46	Inderwal	63.28%	Sheikh Ghulam Mohammed	JKNC	10,367	42.92%	Mohammed Sharief	INC	8,104	33.55%	2,263
47	Bhaderwah (SC)	65.54%	Hari Lal Hitaishit	INC	11,706	48.87%	Bodh Raj	JKNC	11,209	46.8%	497
48	Doda	Result withheld by Jammu and Kashmir High Court									
49	Ramban	61.18%	Jagdev Singh	INC	8,519	43.17%	Prem Singh	JKNC	7,467	37.84%	1,052
50	Banihal	67.42%	Abdul Rashid	JKNC	15,046	63.67%	Sona Ullah	INC	6,821	28.87%	8,225
51	Gulabgarh	62.96%	Haji Buland Khan	JKNC	14,348	60.47%	Mohammed Ayub Khan	INC	7,994	33.69%	6,354
52	Reasi	59.43%	Jagjivan Lal	JKNC	7,895	32.86%	Rajit Singh	INC	6,693	27.86%	1,202
53	Udhampur	59.06%	Balak Ram	INC	12,417	45.32%	Shiv Charan Gupta	BJP	5,998	21.89%	6,419
54	Chenani	57.96%	Bhim Singh	Independent	7,690	34.37%	Yash Paul Khajuria	INC	7,428	33.2%	262
55	Ramnagar (SC)	55.29%	Ram Dass	INC	12,729	56.%	Charan Dass	JKNC	4,983	21.92%	7,746
56	Samba	64.54%	Parkash Sharma	INC	13,515	44.66%	Surjeet Singh	JKNC	6,400	21.15%	7,115
57	Bari Brahmana (SC)	72.5%	Gouri Shankar	INC	15,721	52.91%	Gurnbachan Kumari	JKNC	10,131	34.1%	5,590
58	Bishnah (SC)	77.02%	Bhagat Chhaju Ram	INC	21,123	67.18%	Parma Nand	JKNC	8,159	25.95%	12,964
59	Ranbir Singh Pora–Jammu South	73.94%	Janak Raj Gupta	INC	15,744	49.73%	Rajinder Singh Chib	JKNC	11,221	35.44%	4,523
60	Jammu Cantonment	61.89%	Trilochan Datta	Independent	16,094	50.61%	Harbans Singh	INC	10,986	34.55%	5,108
61	Jammu West	51.65%	Rangil Singh	INC	16,672	66.38%	Tilak Raj Sharma	BJP	4,331	17.24%	12,341
62	Jammu East	59.01%	Om Parkash	INC	14,262	55.98%	Chaman Lal Gupta	BJP	7,619	29.91%	6,643
63	Jandrah Gharota	65.09%	Balwan Singh	INC	12,628	43.21%	Rattan Chand	Independent	4,190	14.34%	8,438
64	Marh (SC)	69.07%	Mula Ram	INC	14,543	58.02%	Krit Paul	Independent	3,295	13.15%	11,248
65	Akhnoor	76.64%	Dharam Pal	INC	13,067	45.67%	Govind Ram Sharma	JKNC	9,527	33.29%	3,540
66	Chhamb	74.27%	Madan Lal	INC	14,090	57.23%	Ram Nath	BJP	4,208	17.09%	9,882
67	Basohli	63.38%	Mangat Ram Sharma	INC	14,019	53.42%	Darshan Kumar Sharma	JKNC	8,939	34.06%	5,080
68	Billawar	60.65%	Puran Singh	INC	12,054	43.38%	Kashmir Singh	JKNC	4,539	16.33%	7,515
69	Kathua (SC)	58.62%	Sanji Ram	INC	14,667	52.48%	Baldev Raj	BJP	5,905	21.13%	8,762
70	Hiranagar	68.69%	Ram Dass	INC	13,218	39.91%	Baldev Singh	BJP	9,788	29.55%	3,430
71	Nowshera	65.39%	Beli Ram	INC	10,395	30.05%	Rachpal Singh	JKNC	7,202	20.82%	3,193
72	Darhal	68.84%	Bashir Ahmed	INC	13,435	40.33%	Chowdhary Mohmmad Hussain	JKNC	11,100	33.32%	2,335
73	Rajouri	70.64%	Talib Hussain	JKNC	17,683	49.95%	Mirza Abdul Rashid	INC	15,488	43.75%	2,195
74	Surankote	71.24%	Aslam Chowdhary Mohammad	INC	14,150	48.27%	Mohammed Sayeed Beig	JKNC	12,268	41.85%	1,882
75	Mendhar	77.51%	Ragfiq Hussain Khan	JKNC	17,445	54.76%	Mohammed Sadiq	INC	13,926	43.71%	3,519
76	Haveli	66.22%	Ghulam Ahmad	JKNC	8,555	29.64%	Yash Lal	Independent	7,241	25.09%	1,314

== Bibliography ==
- Bose, Sumantra (2003), Kashmir: Roots of Conflict, Paths to Peace, Harvard University Press, ISBN 0-674-01173-2
- Guha, Ramachandra (2008), India after Gandhi: The History of the World's Largest Democracy, Pan Macmillan, ISBN 978-0330396110
- Schofield, Victoria (2003) [First published in 2000], Kashmir in Conflict, London and New York: I. B. Taurus & Co, ISBN 1860648983
- Widmalm, Sten (November 1997), "The Rise and Fall of Democracy in Jammu and Kashmir", Asian Survey, 37 (11): 1005–1030, doi:10.2307/2645738, JSTOR 2645738
- Widmalm, Sten (2002), Kashmir in Comparative Perspective: Democracy and Violent Separatism in India, Psychology Press, ISBN 978-0-7007-1578-7
