= Nagin Assembly constituency =

Constituency of the Jammu and Kashmir legislative assembly in India

Nagin
- Former constituency for the Jammu and Kashmir Legislative Assembly

Constituency details
- Country: India
- Region: North India
- State: Jammu and Kashmir
- Established: 1977
- Abolished: 1987
- Total electors: 30,321

Nagin Assembly constituency was an assembly constituency in the India state of Jammu and Kashmir.

== Members of the Legislative Assembly ==
Election	Member	Party
1977	Abdul Samad Teli	Jammu & Kashmir National Conference
1983	Abdul Samad Teli	Jammu & Kashmir National Conference
1987	Abdul Samad Teli	Jammu & Kashmir National Conference

== Election results ==
=== Assembly Election 1987 ===
1987 Jammu and Kashmir Legislative Assembly election : Nagin
Party	Candidate	Votes	%	±%
JKNC	Abdul Samad Teli	14,093	48.24%	▼19.21
Independent	Hakim Mohammed Jawad	12,510	42.82%	New
JKNC	Nazir Ahmad	1,175	4.02%	▼63.42
Independent	Syed Liyaqat	875	2.99%	New
Independent	Abdul Qayoom	410	1.40%	New
Margin of victory		1,583	5.42%	▼32.24
Turnout		29,217	99.89%	▲21.29
Registered electors		30,321		▼29.88
JKNC hold		Swing	▼19.21	

=== Assembly Election 1983 ===
1983 Jammu and Kashmir Legislative Assembly election : Nagin
Party	Candidate	Votes	%	±%
JKNC	Abdul Samad Teli	21,893	67.45%	▲5.94
INC	Ghulam Mohmad Bawan	9,670	29.79%	▲28.81
BJP	Sheikh Ghulam Rasool	307	0.95%	New
Independent	Mushtaq Ahmad	242	0.75%	New
Independent	Mohmad Shafi Mir	195	0.60%	New
Margin of victory		12,223	37.66%	▲13.42
Turnout		32,460	77.71%	▼1.32
Registered electors		43,240		▲46.63
JKNC hold		Swing	▲5.94	

=== Assembly Election 1977 ===
1977 Jammu and Kashmir Legislative Assembly election : Nagin
Party	Candidate	Votes	%	±%
JKNC	Abdul Samad Teli	13,856	61.51%	New
JP	Ghulam Mohmad Bawan	8,397	37.28%	New
INC	Malik Ghulam Mohammd	220	0.98%	New
Margin of victory		5,459	24.23%	
Turnout		22,527	78.58%	
Registered electors		29,490		
JKNC win (new seat)				
