= Jammu Cantonment Assembly constituency =

Constituency of the Jammu and Kashmir legislative assembly in India

Jammu Cantonment
- Former constituency for the Jammu and Kashmir Legislative Assembly

Constituency details
- Country: India
- Region: North India
- State: Jammu and Kashmir
- Established: 1967
- Abolished: 1987
- Total electors: 61,710

Jammu Cantonment Assembly constituency was an assembly constituency in the India state of Jammu and Kashmir.

== Members of the Legislative Assembly ==
Election	Member	Party
1967	P. T. Dutta	Indian National Congress
1972	Trilochan Dutta	Indian National Congress
1977	Parduman Singh	Indian National Congress
1983	Trilochan Datta	Independent politician
1987	H. S. Bali	Independent politician

== Election results ==
=== Assembly Election 1987 ===
1987 Jammu and Kashmir Legislative Assembly election : Jammu Cantonment
Party	Candidate	Votes	%	±%
Independent	H. S. Bali	10,970	26.62%	New
INC	Trilochan Dutta	10,110	24.54%	▼10.01
Independent	Amar Nath	5,140	12.48%	New
BJP	Satish Chander	4,630	11.24%	▲7.19
Independent	Chaudhary Piara Singh	3,384	8.21%	New
JKNC	Bhim Singh	3,262	7.92%	▲0.44
Independent	Darshan Lal	698	1.69%	New
Independent	Chaudhary Noor Din Kataria	514	1.25%	New
JP	Mohinder Kumar	454	1.10%	New
Independent	Avtar Singh	422	1.02%	New
Independent	Tilak Raj	402	0.98%	New
Margin of victory		860	2.09%	▼13.98
Turnout		41,202	68.24%	▲6.34
Registered electors		61,710		▲17.26
Independent hold		Swing	▼23.99	

=== Assembly Election 1983 ===
1983 Jammu and Kashmir Legislative Assembly election : Jammu Cantonment
Party	Candidate	Votes	%	±%
Independent	Trilochan Datta	16,094	50.61%	New
INC	Harbans Singh	10,986	34.55%	▲5.95
JKNC	Hans Raj Dogra	2,379	7.48%	▼3.30
BJP	Sewa Raman	1,288	4.05%	New
Independent	Jaya Mala	606	1.91%	New
Margin of victory		5,108	16.06%	▲15.18
Turnout		31,798	61.89%	▲6.17
Registered electors		52,625		▲45.84
Independent gain from INC		Swing	▲22.01	

=== Assembly Election 1977 ===
1977 Jammu and Kashmir Legislative Assembly election : Jammu Cantonment
Party	Candidate	Votes	%	±%
INC	Parduman Singh	5,600	28.60%	▼26.49
JP	Ved Bhasin	5,426	27.71%	New
Independent	Onkar Seth	3,722	19.01%	New
JKNC	Bodh Raj Bali	2,110	10.78%	New
Independent	Hari Singh	996	5.09%	New
Independent	Nathi Ram	650	3.32%	New
Independent	Om Prakash	287	1.47%	New
Independent	Sukhvinder Singh	259	1.32%	New
Independent	Jagdish Raj	228	1.16%	New
Independent	Gurcharan Singh	121	0.62%	New
Margin of victory		174	0.89%	▼40.76
Turnout		19,578	55.35%	▼12.74
Registered electors		36,083		▲11.89
INC hold		Swing	▼26.49	

=== Assembly Election 1972 ===
1972 Jammu and Kashmir Legislative Assembly election : Jammu Cantonment
Party	Candidate	Votes	%	±%
INC	Trilochan Dutta	11,905	55.10%	▲0.49
Independent	Ram Lal	2,905	13.44%	New
Independent	Bachan Singh Panchhi	2,757	12.76%	New
ABJS	Onkar Seth	2,581	11.95%	▼2.13
Independent	Thakra Singh	890	4.12%	New
INC(O)	Harbhajan Singh	242	1.12%	New
Independent	Prem Singh	167	0.77%	New
SSP	Rachpal Singh	160	0.74%	New
Margin of victory		9,000	41.65%	▲12.30
Turnout		21,607	69.17%	▼6.16
Registered electors		32,249		▲20.48
INC hold		Swing	▲0.49	

=== Assembly Election 1967 ===
1967 Jammu and Kashmir Legislative Assembly election : Jammu Cantonment
Party	Candidate	Votes	%	±%
INC	P. T. Dutta	10,692	54.60%	New
JKNC	R. Singh	4,945	25.25%	New
ABJS	A. Nath	2,757	14.08%	New
Democratic National Conference	J. Singh	1,041	5.32%	New
Independent	S. Dutt	146	0.75%	New
Margin of victory		5,747	29.35%	
Turnout		19,581	76.30%	
Registered electors		26,766		
INC win (new seat)				
