= Haveli Assembly constituency =

Constituency of the Jammu and Kashmir legislative assembly in India

Haveli
- Former constituency for the Jammu and Kashmir Legislative Assembly

Constituency details
- Country: India
- Region: North India
- State: Jammu and Kashmir
- Established: 1977
- Abolished: 1987
- Total electors: 50,911

Haveli Assembly constituency was an assembly constituency in the India state of Jammu and Kashmir.

== Members of the Legislative Assembly ==
Election	Member	Party
1977	Ghulam Ahmed	Jammu & Kashmir National Conference
1983	Ghulam Ahmad	Jammu & Kashmir National Conference
1987	Chaudhry Bashir Ahmed	Independent politician

== Election results ==
=== Assembly Election 1987 ===
1987 Jammu and Kashmir Legislative Assembly election : Haveli
Party	Candidate	Votes	%	±%
Independent	Chaudhry Bashir Ahmed	19,103	56.22%	New
JKNC	Ghulam Ahmed Ganai	14,384	42.33%	▲12.69
BJP	Dwarka Nath	346	1.02%	▲0.09
Margin of victory		4,719	13.89%	▲9.33
Turnout		33,981	67.84%	▲1.88
Registered electors		50,911		▲14.40
Independent gain from JKNC		Swing	▲26.58	

=== Assembly Election 1983 ===
1983 Jammu and Kashmir Legislative Assembly election : Haveli
Party	Candidate	Votes	%	±%
JKNC	Ghulam Ahmad	8,555	29.64%	▼21.67
Independent	Yash Lal	7,241	25.09%	New
INC	Mir Ghulam Mohammed	4,715	16.33%	▼4.21
JKNC	Lal Hussain Mustaq	4,539	15.72%	▼35.59
Independent	Ghulam Mohammed Jan	3,339	11.57%	New
BJP	Dawarka Nath	269	0.93%	New
Independent	Abdul Salam	184	0.64%	New
Margin of victory		1,314	4.55%	▼20.19
Turnout		28,865	66.22%	▲17.53
Registered electors		44,502		▲21.23
JKNC hold		Swing	▼21.67	

=== Assembly Election 1977 ===
1977 Jammu and Kashmir Legislative Assembly election : Haveli
Party	Candidate	Votes	%	±%
JKNC	Ghulam Ahmed	8,915	51.31%	New
JP	Lal Hussain Mustaq	4,616	26.57%	New
INC	Mir Ghulam Mohammed	3,569	20.54%	New
Independent	Nand Gopal	158	0.91%	New
Independent	Salam Joo Alias Abduul Salam	116	0.67%	New
Margin of victory		4,299	24.74%	
Turnout		17,374	48.26%	
Registered electors		36,709		
JKNC win (new seat)				
