= Piyare Lal Handoo =

Indian politician

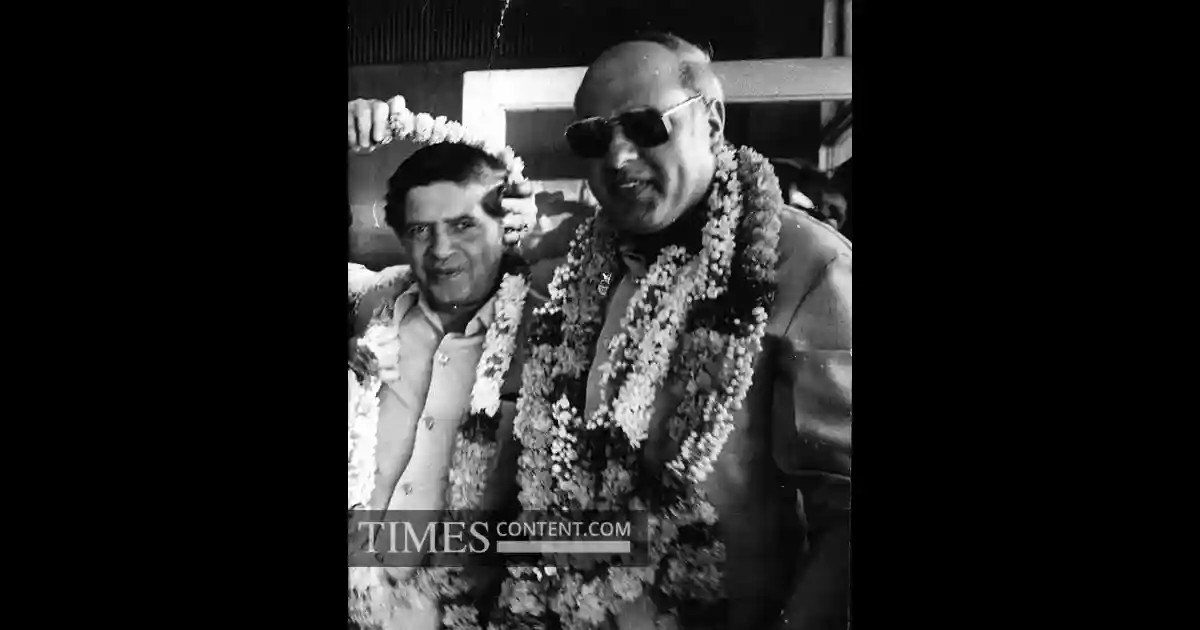

Member of Parliament, Lok Sabha
- In office 1989–1991
- Preceded by: Begum Akbar Jahan Abdullah
- Succeeded by: Mohammad Maqbool Dar
- Constituency: Anantnag

Personal details
- Born: 27 October 1927 Anantnag, Kashmir and Jammu, British India
- Died: 27 January 2001 (aged 73) New Delhi, Delhi, India
- Party: Jammu & Kashmir National Conference
- Spouse: Bhagwati Handoo
- Education: M. A. LLB hons. (Lucknow University)

Piyare Lal Handoo (27 October 1927 – 27 January 2001) was an Indian politician who was a member of 6th Lok Sabha. He was also a lawyer, social worker, and teacher; he was known for his participation in the Indian independence movement.

== Electoral performance ==
Election	Constituency	Party	Result	Votes %	Opposition Candidate	Opposition Party	Opposition vote %	Ref
1996	Habba Kadal	JKNC	Won	59.83%	Sarla Taploo	BJP	19.69%	
1987	Habba Kadal	JKNC	Won	48.51%	Mushtaq Ahmad	Independent	44.89%	
1983	Pahalgam	JKNC	Won	56.77%	Mohammed Tahir	INC	36.25%	
1977	Pahalgam	JKNC	Won	68.78%	Ghulam Rasool Kochah	JP	19.95%	
