= Zaina Kadal Assembly constituency =

Constituency of the Jammu and Kashmir legislative assembly in India

Zaina Kadal
- Former constituency for the Jammu and Kashmir Legislative Assembly

Constituency details
- Country: India
- Region: North India
- State: Jammu and Kashmir
- Established: 1977
- Abolished: 1987
- Total electors: 48,211

Zaina Kadal Assembly constituency was an assembly constituency in the India state of Jammu and Kashmir.

== Members of the Legislative Assembly ==
Election	Member	Party
1977	Molvi Mohammed Yasin Hamdani	Jammu & Kashmir National Conference
1983	Ali Mohammad Charloo	Jammu & Kashmir National Conference
1987	Ali Mohammad Charloo	Jammu & Kashmir National Conference

== Election results ==
=== Assembly Election 1987 ===
1987 Jammu and Kashmir Legislative Assembly election : Zaina Kadal
Party	Candidate	Votes	%	±%
JKNC	Ali Mohammad Charloo	22,820	64.42%	▼32.53
Independent	Firdous Atta	12,243	34.56%	New
Margin of victory		10,577	29.86%	▼65.60
Turnout		35,426	75.56%	▼19.20
Registered electors		48,211		▲12.91
JKNC hold		Swing	▼32.53	

=== Assembly Election 1983 ===
1983 Jammu and Kashmir Legislative Assembly election : Zaina Kadal
Party	Candidate	Votes	%	±%
JKNC	Ali Mohammad Charloo	38,366	96.94%	▲35.15
Independent	Noor Mohammed	587	1.48%	New
JI	Altaf	461	1.16%	New
Margin of victory		37,779	95.46%	▲71.87
Turnout		39,576	93.47%	▲8.72
Registered electors		42,700		▼5.38
JKNC hold		Swing	▲35.15	

=== Assembly Election 1977 ===
1977 Jammu and Kashmir Legislative Assembly election : Zaina Kadal
Party	Candidate	Votes	%	±%
JKNC	Molvi Mohammed Yasin Hamdani	23,414	61.79%	New
JP	Sheikh Ali Mohammad	14,476	38.21%	New
Margin of victory		8,938	23.59%	
Turnout		37,890	85.39%	
Registered electors		45,128		
JKNC win (new seat)				
