= Bari Brahmana Assembly constituency =

Constituency of the Jammu and Kashmir legislative assembly in India

Bari Brahmana
- Former constituency for the Jammu and Kashmir Legislative Assembly

Constituency details
- Country: India
- Region: North India
- State: Jammu and Kashmir
- Established: 1977
- Abolished: 1990
- Total electors: 42,415

Bari Brahmana was an assembly constituency in the India state of Jammu and Kashmir.

== Members of the Legislative Assembly ==
Election	Member	Party
1977	Gurnbachan Kumari	Janata Party
1983	Gouri Shankar	Indian National Congress
1987	Swaran Lata	Indian National Congress

== Election results ==
=== Assembly Election 1987 ===
1987 Jammu and Kashmir Legislative Assembly election : Bari Brahmana
Party	Candidate	Votes	%	±%
INC	Swaran Lata	14,539	45.51%	▼7.41
Independent	Gurnbachan Kumari	8,466	26.50%	New
Independent	Sewa Raman	5,637	17.64%	New
BJP	Bansi Lal	1,265	3.96%	▲0.17
Independent	Ram Lal	906	2.84%	New
Independent	Bhagat Ram Bhagat	612	1.92%	New
LKD	Dharam Paul	524	1.64%	▲0.51
Margin of victory		6,073	19.01%	▲0.19
Turnout		31,949	76.69%	▲4.31
Registered electors		42,415		▲1.38
INC hold		Swing	▼7.41	

=== Assembly Election 1983 ===
1983 Jammu and Kashmir Legislative Assembly election : Bari Brahmana
Party	Candidate	Votes	%	±%
INC	Gouri Shankar	15,721	52.91%	▲16.61
JKNC	Gurnbachan Kumari	10,131	34.10%	▲24.35
Independent	Babu Ram	1,559	5.25%	New
BJP	Gian Chand	1,127	3.79%	New
Independent	Rattan Chand	838	2.82%	New
LKD	Dharam Paul	335	1.13%	New
Margin of victory		5,590	18.81%	▲15.90
Turnout		29,711	72.50%	▲12.41
Registered electors		41,837		▲18.34
INC gain from JP		Swing	▲13.70	

=== Assembly Election 1977 ===
1977 Jammu and Kashmir Legislative Assembly election : Bari Brahmana
Party	Candidate	Votes	%	±%
JP	Gurnbachan Kumari	8,124	39.21%	New
INC	Gouri Shankar	7,521	36.30%	New
JKNC	Inder Lal	2,019	9.74%	New
Independent	Hans Raj	1,126	5.43%	New
Independent	Sewa Raman	665	3.21%	New
Independent	Bashi Ram	642	3.10%	New
CPI	Gian Chand	377	1.82%	New
Independent	Babu Ram	246	1.19%	New
Margin of victory		603	2.91%	
Turnout		20,720	59.58%	
Registered electors		35,352		
JP win (new seat)				
