= Baramulla Assembly constituency =

Constituency of the Jammu and Kashmir Legislative Assembly

Coordinates: 34.20°N 74.35°E

Baramulla
- Constituency No. 10 for the Jammu and Kashmir Legislative Assembly

Constituency details
- Country: India
- State: Jammu and Kashmir
- District: Baramulla
- Lok Sabha constituency: Baramulla
- Established: 1962

Member of Legislative Assembly
- Incumbent Javid Hassan Baig
- Party: Jammu and Kashmir National Conference
- Elected year: 2024

Baramulla Assembly constituency is one of the 90 constituencies in the Jammu and Kashmir Legislative Assembly of Jammu and Kashmir a north state of India. Baramulla is also part of Baramulla Lok Sabha constituency.

== Members of the Legislative Assembly ==
Election	Member	Party
1962	Harbans Singh Azad	Jammu & Kashmir National Conference
1967	Shamas-Ud-Din	Jammu & Kashmir National Conference
1972	Mohammed Maqbool Mahjoo	Indian National Congress
1977	Ghulam Ud-Din Shah	Jammu & Kashmir National Conference
1983	Shiekh Mohammed Maqbol	Jammu & Kashmir National Conference
1987	Shiekh Mohammed Maqbol	Jammu & Kashmir National Conference
1996	Mujahid Mohammed Abdullah	Jammu & Kashmir National Conference
2002	Muzaffar Hussain Baig	Jammu and Kashmir People's Democratic Party
2008	Muzaffar Hussain Baig	Jammu and Kashmir People's Democratic Party
2014	Javid Hassan Baig	Jammu and Kashmir People's Democratic Party
2024	Javid Hassan Baig	Jammu and Kashmir National Conference

== Election results ==
=== Assembly Election 2024 ===
2024 Jammu and Kashmir Legislative Assembly election : Baramulla
Party	Candidate	Votes	%	±%
JKNC	Javid Hassan Baig	22,523	32.75%	New
Independent	Shoaib Nabi Lone	10,750	15.63%	New
Independent	Muzaffar Hussain Baig	5,872	8.54%	New
Independent	Touseef Mehraj Raina	5,324	7.74%	New
INC	Mir Iqbal Ahmad	4,669	6.79%	▼13.86
JKAP	Shabir Ahmad Lone	3,183	4.63%	New
JKPDP	Mohammed Rafiq Rather	3,177	4.62%	▼39.13
Independent	Ravinder Singh	2,599	3.78%	New
Independent	Abdul Rehman Shalla	1,968	2.86%	New
NOTA	None of the Above	561	0.82%	▼1.48
Margin of victory		11,773	17.12%	▼4.18
Turnout		68,779	54.49%	▲14.76
Registered electors		1,26,225		▲52.19
JKNC gain from JKPDP		Swing	▼11.00	

=== Assembly Election 2014 ===
2014 Jammu and Kashmir Legislative Assembly election : Baramulla
Party	Candidate	Votes	%	±%
JKPDP	Javid Hassan Baig	14,418	43.75%	▼9.70
JKNC	Ghulam Hassan Rahi	7,401	22.46%	▼8.83
INC	Salman Anees Soz	6,805	20.65%	▲15.04
JKPC	Mohammed Yousf Dar	1,164	3.53%	New
Independent	Ghulam Ud-Din Gulshan	850	2.58%	New
NOTA	None of the Above	758	2.30%	New
Independent	Mohammed Maqbool Mir	570	1.73%	New
Independent	Mohammed Aslam Deedar	381	1.16%	New
Independent	Altaf Jameel Lone	209	0.63%	New
Margin of victory		7,017	21.29%	▼0.87
Turnout		32,954	39.73%	▲6.42
Registered electors		82,937		▲13.44
JKPDP hold		Swing	▼9.70	

=== Assembly Election 2008 ===
2008 Jammu and Kashmir Legislative Assembly election : Baramulla
Party	Candidate	Votes	%	±%
JKPDP	Muzaffar Hussain Baig	13,019	53.46%	▲14.84
JKNC	Nazir Hussain Khan	7,621	31.29%	▲8.77
INC	Mushtaq Ahmad Mir	1,367	5.61%	▲0.82
Independent	Harmeet Singh	927	3.81%	New
RSP	Mushtaq Ahmad Parray	404	1.66%	New
Independent	Ghulam Mohiuddin Akhoon	226	0.93%	New
JKNPP	Raja Begum	168	0.69%	New
Jammu & Kashmir Democratic Party Nationalist	Ghulam Mohammad Mattoo	167	0.69%	New
JKANC	Ghulam Din Shah	166	0.68%	New
Margin of victory		5,398	22.16%	▲6.06
Turnout		24,355	33.31%	▲9.17
Registered electors		73,112		▼0.22
JKPDP hold		Swing	▲14.84	

=== Assembly Election 2002 ===
2002 Jammu and Kashmir Legislative Assembly election : Baramulla
Party	Candidate	Votes	%	±%
JKPDP	Muzaffar Hussain Baig	6,833	38.62%	New
JKNC	Ghulam Nabi Kachru	3,984	22.52%	▼18.76
Independent	Khursheed Ahmed	1,673	9.46%	New
Independent	Ghulam Hassan Rahi	1,147	6.48%	New
INC	Ghulam Nabi Monga	848	4.79%	▼8.56
BJP	Damoder Singh	828	4.68%	New
Independent	Harbans Singh	658	3.72%	New
Independent	Mohammed Sakhi Gojer	540	3.05%	New
JD(U)	Gulshan Snhotra	478	2.70%	New
BSP	Harbajan Singh	298	1.68%	New
Independent	Ghulam Rasool	231	1.31%	New
Margin of victory		2,849	16.10%	▼11.82
Turnout		17,693	24.15%	▼11.11
Registered electors		73,274		▲39.39
JKPDP gain from JKNC		Swing	▼2.66	

=== Assembly Election 1996 ===
1996 Jammu and Kashmir Legislative Assembly election : Baramulla
Party	Candidate	Votes	%	±%
JKNC	Mujahid Mohammed Abdullah	7,649	41.28%	▼6.78
INC	Mohammed Sareer Khan	2,474	13.35%	New
JD	Ghulam Mohi-Ud-Din	2,113	11.40%	New
Independent	Damoodar Singh	1,862	10.05%	New
Independent	Ali Mohammed Bhat	1,770	9.55%	New
JKNPP	Daljeet Singh	1,332	7.19%	New
Independent	Gulzaman Khan	1,331	7.18%	New
Margin of victory		5,175	27.93%	▲23.68
Turnout		18,531	37.47%	▼40.84
Registered electors		52,566		▲18.31
JKNC hold		Swing	▼6.78	

=== Assembly Election 1987 ===
1987 Jammu and Kashmir Legislative Assembly election : Baramulla
Party	Candidate	Votes	%	±%
JKNC	Shiekh Mohammed Maqbol	16,247	48.06%	▲12.01
Independent	Ghulam Mohmad	14,811	43.81%	New
Independent	Manjeet Singh	1,399	4.14%	New
JKNC	Mohammed Akbar Dar	1,123	3.32%	▼32.72
Margin of victory		1,436	4.25%	▼9.08
Turnout		33,806	77.35%	▲6.23
Registered electors		44,429		▲14.02
JKNC hold		Swing	▲12.01	

=== Assembly Election 1983 ===
1983 Jammu and Kashmir Legislative Assembly election : Baramulla
Party	Candidate	Votes	%	±%
JKNC	Shiekh Mohammed Maqbol	9,812	36.05%	▼19.60
JI	Ghulam Mohammed Safi	6,185	22.72%	▲1.10
JKNC	Muzaffar Hussain Baig	5,163	18.97%	▼36.68
INC	Mohammed Ismail Rather	5,059	18.58%	New
Independent	Mohammed Akbar Dar	607	2.23%	New
Margin of victory		3,627	13.32%	▼20.70
Turnout		27,221	74.13%	▲5.52
Registered electors		38,967		▲21.21
JKNC hold		Swing	▼19.60	

=== Assembly Election 1977 ===
1977 Jammu and Kashmir Legislative Assembly election : Baramulla
Party	Candidate	Votes	%	±%
JKNC	Ghulam Ud-Din Shah	11,509	55.64%	New
JI	Ghulam Meha Safi	4,472	21.62%	New
JP	Abdul Hamid Kakroo	3,632	17.56%	New
Independent	Abdul Salam Rather	654	3.16%	New
Independent	Piaray Lal	170	0.82%	New
Independent	Joginder Singh	129	0.62%	New
Margin of victory		7,037	34.02%	▲20.70
Turnout		20,684	66.78%	▲15.77
Registered electors		32,149		▼9.28
JKNC gain from INC		Swing	▲10.27	

=== Assembly Election 1972 ===
1972 Jammu and Kashmir Legislative Assembly election : Baramulla
Party	Candidate	Votes	%	±%
INC	Mohammed Maqbool Mahjoo	7,809	45.37%	▲3.65
Independent	Abdul Hamid Khan	5,517	32.06%	New
Independent	Abdul Hamid Kakroo	1,876	10.90%	New
ABJS	Soom Nath	835	4.85%	New
Independent	Sant Singh	732	4.25%	New
Independent	Prem Nath Raina	442	2.57%	New
Margin of victory		2,292	13.32%	▼3.24
Turnout		17,211	50.60%	▼2.11
Registered electors		35,437		▲14.00
INC gain from JKNC		Swing	▼12.91	

=== Assembly Election 1967 ===
1967 Jammu and Kashmir Legislative Assembly election : Baramulla
Party	Candidate	Votes	%	±%
JKNC	Shamas-Ud-Din	9,180	58.28%	▼30.17
INC	H. Singh	6,572	41.72%	New
Margin of victory		2,608	16.56%	▼60.34
Turnout		15,752	55.01%	▼25.94
Registered electors		31,085		▲23.75
JKNC hold		Swing	▼30.17	

=== Assembly Election 1962 ===
1962 Jammu and Kashmir Legislative Assembly election : Baramulla
Party	Candidate	Votes	%	±%
JKNC	Harbans Singh Azad	17,021	88.45%	New
Independent	Sant Singh	2,223	11.55%	New
Margin of victory		14,798	76.90%	
Turnout		19,244	80.03%	
Registered electors		25,119		
JKNC win (new seat)				

== See also ==
- Baramulla
- List of constituencies of Jammu and Kashmir Legislative Assembly
