= Habba Kadal Assembly constituency =

Constituency of the Jammu and Kashmir Legislative Assembly

Coordinates: 34.080°N 74.810°E

Habba Kadal
- Constituency No. 21 for the Jammu and Kashmir Legislative Assembly

Constituency details
- Country: India
- State: Jammu and Kashmir
- District: Srinagar
- Lok Sabha constituency: Srinagar
- Established: 1962

Member of Legislative Assembly
- Incumbent Shamim Firdous
- Party: JKNC
- Elected year: 2024

Habba Kadal Assembly constituency is one of the 90 constituencies in the Jammu and Kashmir Legislative Assembly of Jammu and Kashmir, a northern Union Territory of India. Habba Kadal is part of the Srinagar Lok Sabha constituency.

== Members of the Legislative Assembly ==
Election	Member	Party
1951	Shyam Lal Saraf	Jammu & Kashmir National Conference
1962	Durga Prasad Dhar	Jammu & Kashmir National Conference
1967	S. K. Kaul	Indian National Congress
1972	Ghulam Mohammed Butt	Independent politician
1977	Ghulam Mohammed Butt	Jammu & Kashmir National Conference
1983	Ghulam Mohammed Butt	Jammu & Kashmir National Conference
1987	Piyare Lal Handoo	Jammu & Kashmir National Conference
1996	Piyare Lal Handoo	Jammu & Kashmir National Conference
2002	Raman Mattoo	Independent politician
2008	Shamim Firdous	Jammu & Kashmir National Conference
2014	Shamim Firdous	Jammu & Kashmir National Conference
2024	Shamim Firdous	Jammu & Kashmir National Conference

== Election results ==
=== Assembly Election 2024 ===
2024 Jammu and Kashmir Legislative Assembly election: Habba Kadal
Party	Candidate	Votes	%	±%
JKNC	Shamim Firdous	12,437	64.68	▲22.28
BJP	Ashok Kumar Bhat	2,899	15.08	▼7.14
Independent	Nazir Ahmad Gilkar	1,475	7.67	▲5.44
JKPDP	Arif Irshad Laigroo	602	3.13	▼5.36
Independent	Nazir Ahmad Sofi	330	1.72	New
JKANC	Muzzafar Shah	276	1.44	New
RLJP	Sanjay Saraf	265	1.38	New
Independent	Asif Ahmad Beigh	160	0.83	New
NOTA	None of the Above	148	0.77	▼0.24
Independent	Ajaz Ahmad Sofi	134	0.70	New
Margin of victory		9,538	49.60	▲29.42
Turnout		19,229	20.13	▼1.18
Registered electors		95,546		▲74.17
JKNC hold		Swing	▲15.14 (Note: Two-party swing)	

=== Assembly Election 2014 ===
2014 Jammu and Kashmir Legislative Assembly election: Habba Kadal
Party	Candidate	Votes	%	±%
JKNC	Shamim Firdous	4,955	42.40	▲1.26
BJP	Moti Koul	2,596	22.21	▲10.57
JKPDP	Zafar Meraj	992	8.49	▲2.53
INC	Raman Mattoo	973	8.33	▲4.67
LJP	Sanjay Saraf	830	7.10	▼1.44
Independent	Waseem Ahmed Shalla	508	4.35	New
Independent	Nazir Ahmad Gilkar	261	2.23	New
Independent	Bilal Ahmad Parra	211	1.81	New
Independent	Mohammed Muneeb Bhat	158	1.35	New
NOTA	None of the Above	118	1.01	New
Margin of victory		2,359	20.19	▼9.31
Turnout		11,686	21.30	▲9.68
Registered electors		54,858		▲10.45
JKNC hold		Swing	▲5.91 (Note: Two-party swing)	

=== Assembly Election 2008 ===
2008 Jammu and Kashmir Legislative Assembly election: Habba Kadal
Party	Candidate	Votes	%	±%
JKNC	Shamim Firdous	2,374	41.14	▲27.27
BJP	Hira Lal Chatta	672	11.65	▼8.53
LJP	Sanjay Saraf	493	8.54	▼9.45
JKPDP	Abdul Hameed Bhat	344	5.96	▲3.88
JKPDF	Bilal Ahmed Parra	292	5.06	New
Independent	Raman Mattoo	280	4.85	New
Independent	Ramesh Lal Trisal	250	4.33	New
INC	Moti Lal Koul	211	3.66	▼1.48
Independent	Bharat Raina	179	3.10	New
Independent	Reyaz Ahmed Channa	152	2.63	New
Margin of victory		1,702	29.50	▲21.20
Turnout		5,770	11.62	▲8.53
Registered electors		49,667		▼25.63
JKNC gain from Independent		Swing	▲12.68	

=== Assembly Election 2002 ===
2002 Jammu and Kashmir Legislative Assembly election: Habba Kadal
Party	Candidate	Votes	%	±%
Independent	Raman Mattoo	587	28.47	New
BJP	Hira Lal Chatta	416	20.17	▲0.49
LJP	Sanjay Saraf	371	17.99	New
JKNC	Shameema	286	13.87	▼45.96
Independent	Bharat Bushan Koul	112	5.43	New
INC	Mohammed Sultan	106	5.14	▼5.13
JKAL	Capt. Shiban Krishen Tickoo	85	4.12	New
JKPDP	Brij Krishan Vashnavi	43	2.09	New
Independent	Ashok Kak	28	1.36	New
JKNPP	Rattan Lal Bhan	22	1.07	New
Margin of victory		171	8.29	▼31.85
Turnout		2,062	3.21	▼13.77
Registered electors		66,782		▲12.56
Independent gain from JKNC		Swing	▼31.36	

=== Assembly Election 1996 ===
1996 Jammu and Kashmir Legislative Assembly election: Habba Kadal
Party	Candidate	Votes	%	±%
JKNC	Piyare Lal Handoo	5,984	59.83	▲11.32
BJP	Sarla Taploo	1,969	19.69	▲14.80
INC	Moti Lal Koul	1,027	10.27	New
JD	Ishfaq	533	5.33	New
Independent	Shiban Kishen Tikoo	489	4.89	New
Margin of victory		4,015	40.14	▲36.51
Turnout		10,002	5.37	▼42.47
Registered electors		59,329		▼0.95
JKNC hold		Swing	▲13.06 (Note: Two-party swing)	

=== Assembly Election 1987 ===
1987 Jammu and Kashmir Legislative Assembly election: Habba Kadal
Party	Candidate	Votes	%	±%
JKNC	Piyare Lal Handoo	17,240	48.51	▼21.01
Independent	Mushtaq Ahmad	15,951	44.89	New
BJP	Tikka Lal Taploo	1,736	4.89	▲4.04
Independent	Mohammed Ismail Khan	418	1.18	New
Margin of victory		1,289	3.63	▼37.18
Turnout		35,537	60.06	▼14.00
Registered electors		59,900		▲10.07
JKNC hold		Swing	▼21.01	

=== Assembly Election 1983 ===
1983 Jammu and Kashmir Legislative Assembly election: Habba Kadal
Party	Candidate	Votes	%	±%
JKNC	Ghulam Mohammed Butt	27,745	69.53	▲22.00
INC	Piaray Lal Kharihalu	11,462	28.72	▲26.84
BJP	Soom Nath	337	0.84	New
Margin of victory		16,283	40.80	▲34.20
Turnout		39,906	75.24	▲4.11
Registered electors		54,421		▲9.45
JKNC hold		Swing		

=== Assembly Election 1977 ===
1977 Jammu and Kashmir Legislative Assembly election: Habba Kadal
Party	Candidate	Votes	%	±%
JKNC	Ghulam Mohammed Butt	16,356	47.53	New
JP	Jag Mohini	14,084	40.92	New
Independent	Tika Lal Taploo	2,990	8.69	New
INC	Sri Kanth Kaul	649	1.89	▼16.47
Margin of victory		2,272	6.60	▼4.72
Turnout		34,415	70.62	▲16.78
Registered electors		49,722		▲81.51
JKNC gain from Independent		Swing	▲12.23	

=== Assembly Election 1972 ===
1972 Jammu and Kashmir Legislative Assembly election: Habba Kadal
Party	Candidate	Votes	%	±%
Independent	Ghulam Mohammed Butt	5,069	35.29	New
ABJS	Tikalal	3,443	23.97	▲3.57
INC	Jager Nath Zutshi	2,637	18.36	▼28.55
Independent	Syed Mushtaq H. Gillani	1,044	7.27	New
Independent	Khem Pata Wakhloo	894	6.22	New
Independent	Ghulam Qadir Kiani	654	4.55	New
Independent	Janki Nath Daftari	195	1.36	New
Independent	Motilal	160	1.11	New
Independent	Harji Lal	102	0.71	New
Margin of victory		1,626	11.32	▼14.66
Turnout		14,363	54.93	▲19.04
Registered electors		27,393		▲23.09
Independent gain from INC		Swing	▼11.62	

=== Assembly Election 1967 ===
1967 Jammu and Kashmir Legislative Assembly election: Habba Kadal
Party	Candidate	Votes	%	±%
INC	S. K. Kaul	3,486	46.91	New
JKNC	R. N. Kaul	1,555	20.93	▼74.23
ABJS	T. Nath	1,516	20.40	New
Independent	Ghulam Mohammad Bhat	651	8.76	New
Democratic National Conference	P. A. Aziz	165	2.22	▼1.17
PSP	Piaray Lal Kaul	58	0.78	▼0.68
Margin of victory		1,931	25.99	▼65.78
Turnout		7,431	34.93	▼43.07
Registered electors		22,254		▲11.70
INC gain from JKNC		Swing	▼48.24	

=== Assembly Election 1962 ===
1962 Jammu and Kashmir Legislative Assembly election: Habba Kadal
Party	Candidate	Votes	%	±%
JKNC	Durga Prasad Dhar	14,495	95.16	New
Democratic National Conference	Ghulam Mohammed Malik	516	3.39	New
PSP	Piaray Lal Kaul	222	1.46	New
Margin of victory		13,979	91.77	
Turnout		15,233	76.46	
Registered electors		19,923		
JKNC win (new seat)				

== See also ==
- Habba Kadal
- List of constituencies of Jammu and Kashmir Legislative Assembly
