= Pahalgam Assembly constituency =

Constituency of the Jammu and Kashmir legislative assembly in India

Coordinates: 34.01°N 75.32°E

Pahalgam
- Constituency No. 47 for the Jammu and Kashmir Legislative Assembly

Constituency details
- Country: India
- State: Jammu and Kashmir
- District: Anantnag
- Lok Sabha constituency: Anantnag-Rajouri
- Established: 1967

Pahalgam Assembly constituency is one of the 90 constituencies in the Legislative Assembly of Jammu and Kashmir, a northern Union Territory of India. Pahalgam is also part of Anantnag-Rajouri Lok Sabha constituency.

== Members of the Legislative Assembly ==
Election	Member	Party
1967	Makhan Lal Fotedar	Indian National Congress
1972	Makhan Lal Fotedar	Indian National Congress
1977	Piyare Lal Handoo	Jammu & Kashmir National Conference
1983	Piyare Lal Handoo	Jammu & Kashmir National Conference
1987	Rafi Ahmed Mir	Jammu & Kashmir National Conference
1996	Abdul Kabir Bhat	Jammu & Kashmir National Conference
2002	Mehbooba Mufti	Jammu and Kashmir People's Democratic Party
2004 By-election	Mufti Mohammad Sayeed	Jammu and Kashmir People's Democratic Party
2008	Rafi Ahmad Mir	Jammu and Kashmir People's Democratic Party
2014	Altaf Ahmad Wani	Jammu & Kashmir National Conference
2024	Altaf Ahmad Wani	Jammu & Kashmir National Conference

== Election results ==
=== Assembly Election 2024 ===
2024 Jammu and Kashmir Legislative Assembly election : Pahalgam
Party	Candidate	Votes	%	±%
JKNC	Altaf Ahmad Wani	26,210	52.25%	New
JKAP	Rafi Ahmed Mir	12,454	24.83%	New
JKPDP	Shabir Ahmad Sediqui	8,051	16.05%	▼27.02
NOTA	None of the Above	1,502	2.99%	▲1.12
Independent	Showket Ahmad Bhat	950	1.89%	New
Independent	Mohammed Maqbool Khan	602	1.20%	New
JKANC	Shabir Ahmad Padder	394	0.79%	New
Margin of victory		13,756	27.42%	▲25.82
Turnout		50,163	71.98%	▲2.22
Registered electors		69,693		▼13.94

=== Assembly Election 2014 ===
2014 Jammu and Kashmir Legislative Assembly election : Pahalgam
Party	Candidate	Votes	%	±%
JKNC	Altaf Ahmad Wani	25,232	44.67%	▲17.52
JKPDP	Rafi Ahmad Mir	24,328	43.07%	▼6.22
INC	Irfan Abid	2,148	3.80%	▲2.23
BJP	Sofi Yousuf	1,943	3.44%	▼2.04
NOTA	None of the Above	1,056	1.87%	New
Independent	Farooq Ahmad Rather	788	1.39%	New
BSP	Shabir Ahmad Shah	503	0.89%	▲0.00
JKPC	Anwar Jaan	492	0.87%	New
Margin of victory		904	1.60%	▼20.54
Turnout		56,490	69.75%	▼0.49
Registered electors		80,985		▲15.32
JKNC gain from JKPDP		Swing	▼4.62	

=== Assembly Election 2008 ===
2008 Jammu and Kashmir Legislative Assembly election : Pahalgam
Party	Candidate	Votes	%	±%
JKPDP	Rafi Ahmad Mir	24,316	49.29%	▼15.98
JKNC	Altaf Ahmad Wani	13,394	27.15%	▼0.83
Independent	Irfan Ahmad Bhat	3,861	7.83%	New
BJP	Mohammad Yousuf Sofi	2,702	5.48%	New
LJP	Majid Ashraf Mir	1,093	2.22%	New
INC	Abdul Gani Bhat	778	1.58%	New
JKANC	Shabir Ahmad Padder	759	1.54%	New
Independent	Khadim Hussain Mirza	699	1.42%	New
JD(U)	Ghulam Doyee	517	1.05%	New
Independent	Mohammad Khalil Bhat	468	0.95%	New
BSP	Fayaz Ahmad Wani	438	0.89%	New
Margin of victory		10,922	22.14%	▼15.15
Turnout		49,334	70.25%	▲48.61
Registered electors		70,229		▲9.53
JKPDP hold		Swing	▼15.98	

=== Assembly By-election 2004 ===
2004 Jammu and Kashmir Legislative Assembly by-election : Pahalgam
Party	Candidate	Votes	%	±%
JKPDP	Mufti Mohammad Sayeed	9,056	65.27%	▲20.16
JKNC	Rafi Ahmad Mir	3,882	27.98%	▼5.84
Independent	Bashir Ahmad	521	3.75%	New
SAP	Mohammad Yousaf	416	3.00%	New
Margin of victory		5,174	37.29%	▲26.00
Turnout		13,875	21.64%	▼11.38
Registered electors		64,121		▲11.78
JKPDP hold		Swing	▲20.16	

=== Assembly Election 2002 ===
2002 Jammu and Kashmir Legislative Assembly election : Pahalgam
Party	Candidate	Votes	%	±%
JKPDP	Mehbooba Mufti	8,544	45.11%	New
JKNC	Rafi Ahmed Mir	6,405	33.82%	▼28.00
CPI(M)	Ghulam Nabi	1,788	9.44%	New
INC	Mohammed Yousuf	920	4.86%	▼13.48
JKNPP	Vinod Kumar	501	2.65%	New
BJP	Mohammed Yousuf Malik	401	2.12%	▲0.45
Independent	Nazir Ahmed Khan	381	2.01%	New
Margin of victory		2,139	11.29%	▼32.19
Turnout		18,940	33.02%	▼14.64
Registered electors		57,363		▲22.92
JKPDP gain from JKNC		Swing	▼16.70	

=== Assembly Election 1996 ===
1996 Jammu and Kashmir Legislative Assembly election : Pahalgam
Party	Candidate	Votes	%	±%
JKNC	Abdul Kabir Bhat	13,749	61.81%	▲8.92
INC	Gulshan Akhter	4,078	18.33%	New
JD	Muzaffar Khalid	2,468	11.10%	New
JKAL	Abdul Rashid Misger	1,578	7.09%	New
BJP	Rakesh Koul	370	1.66%	New
Margin of victory		9,671	43.48%	▲34.43
Turnout		22,243	49.51%	▼27.73
Registered electors		46,668		▲14.46
JKNC hold		Swing	▲8.92	

=== Assembly Election 1987 ===
1987 Jammu and Kashmir Legislative Assembly election : Pahalgam
Party	Candidate	Votes	%	±%
JKNC	Rafi Ahmad Mir	16,257	52.89%	▼3.88
Independent	Ghulam Nabi Hagroo	13,476	43.84%	New
Independent	Ghulam Nabi Vaid	580	1.89%	New
Independent	Mukhtar Abbas Khan	345	1.12%	New
Margin of victory		2,781	9.05%	▼11.48
Turnout		30,737	77.70%	▼1.44
Registered electors		40,771		▲13.61
JKNC hold		Swing	▼3.88	

=== Assembly Election 1983 ===
1983 Jammu and Kashmir Legislative Assembly election : Pahalgam
Party	Candidate	Votes	%	±%
JKNC	Piyare Lal Handoo	15,654	56.77%	▼12.00
INC	Mohammed Tahir	9,995	36.25%	▲24.98
JKNC	Manzoor Ahmad Gaina	1,402	5.08%	▼63.69
Independent	Ghulam Hassan Inqalibi	521	1.89%	New
Margin of victory		5,659	20.52%	▼28.30
Turnout		27,572	80.11%	▲4.89
Registered electors		35,886		▲20.27
JKNC hold		Swing	▼12.00	

=== Assembly Election 1977 ===
1977 Jammu and Kashmir Legislative Assembly election : Pahalgam
Party	Candidate	Votes	%	±%
JKNC	Piyare Lal Handoo	14,764	68.78%	New
JP	Ghulam Rasool Kochah	4,283	19.95%	New
INC	Mohammed Tahir	2,420	11.27%	▼67.35
Margin of victory		10,481	48.82%	▼8.43
Turnout		21,467	77.13%	▼6.51
Registered electors		29,839		▲10.69
JKNC gain from INC		Swing		

=== Assembly Election 1972 ===
1972 Jammu and Kashmir Legislative Assembly election : Pahalgam
Party	Candidate	Votes	%	±%
INC	Makhan Lal Fotedar	16,628	78.63%	New
Independent	Hami Ullah	4,520	21.37%	New
Margin of victory		12,108	57.25%	
Turnout		21,148	80.47%	▲78.45
Registered electors		26,957		▲6.79
INC hold		Swing		

=== Assembly Election 1967 ===
1967 Jammu and Kashmir Legislative Assembly election : Pahalgam
Party	Candidate	Votes	%	±%
INC	Makhan Lal Fotedar	Unopposed		
Registered electors		25,244		
INC win (new seat)				

== See also ==
- Pahalgam
- Anantnag district
- List of constituencies of Jammu and Kashmir Legislative Assembly
