= Attaullah Sohrawardi =

Indian politician

Maulana Attaullah Sohrawardi

Member of the Jammu and Kashmir Legislative Assembly
- In office 1987–1996
- Preceded by: Position vacant (results withheld in 1983 elections)
- Succeeded by: Abdul Majid Wani
- Constituency: Doda

Personal details
- Party: Jammu & Kashmir National Conference

Attaullah Sohrawardi was an Indian politician and a prominent member of the Jammu & Kashmir National Conference (NC). He served as the member of the Legislative Assembly (MLA) for the Doda constituency in the erstwhile state of Jammu and Kashmir from 1987 to 1996.

== Political career ==
In the 1987 elections, Sohrawardi contested as a candidate of the Jammu & Kashmir National Conference. He achieved a landslide victory, securing 92.46% of the total votes cast in the Doda constituency. He received 29,232 votes, while his nearest rival, Chuni Lal of the Lok Dal, managed only 1,395 votes. This significant margin reflected strong support for Sohrawardi and his party in the region.

== Election results ==
Year	Party	Votes	Percentage	Opponent	Opponent's Votes	Margin
1987	Jammu & Kashmir National Conference	29,232	92.46%	Chuni Lal (Lokdal)	1,395	27,837

== See also ==
- Jammu & Kashmir National Conference
