= Sopore Assembly constituency =

Constituency of the Jammu and Kashmir legislative assembly in India

Coordinates: 34.29°N 74.46°E

Sopore
- Constituency No. 7 for the Jammu and Kashmir Legislative Assembly

Constituency details
- Country: India
- State: Jammu and Kashmir
- District: Baramulla
- Lok Sabha constituency: Baramulla
- Established: 1962

Member of Legislative Assembly
- Incumbent Irshad Rasool Kar
- Party: Jammu and Kashmir National Conference
- Elected year: 2024

Sopore Assembly constituency is one of the 90 constituencies in the Jammu and Kashmir Legislative Assembly of Jammu and Kashmir a north state of India. Sopore is also part of Baramulla Lok Sabha constituency.

== Members of the Legislative Assembly ==
Election	Member	Party
1962	Abdul Ghani Malik	Jammu & Kashmir National Conference
1967	Ghulam Nabi Mircha	Indian National Congress
1972	Syed Ali Shah Geelani	Jamaat-e-Islami
1977	Syed Ali Shah Geelani	Jamaat-e-Islami
1983	Hakeem Habibullah	Jammu & Kashmir National Conference
1987	Syed Ali Shah Geelani	Independent politician
1996	Abdul Ahad Vakil	Jammu & Kashmir National Conference
2002	Abdul Rashid Dar	Indian National Congress
2008	Mohammed Ashraf Ganie	Jammu & Kashmir National Conference
2014	Abdul Rashid Dar	Indian National Congress
2024	Irshad Rasool Kar	Jammu and Kashmir National Conference

== Election results ==
=== Assembly Election 2024 ===
2024 Jammu and Kashmir Legislative Assembly election : Sopore
Party	Candidate	Votes	%	±%
JKNC	Irshad Rasool Kar	26,975	52.32%	New
Independent	Mursaleen Aajir	6,619	12.84%	New
INC	Abdul Rashid Dar	5,167	10.02%	▼16.36
Independent	Mohammad Latief Wani	2,099	4.07%	New
JKPDP	Irfan Ali Lone	1,687	3.27%	▼14.49
JKAP	Ghulam Mohammad War	1,519	2.95%	New
JKANC	Irshad Ahmad Tantray	1,154	2.24%	New
Independent	Dr. Farooz Ahmad Ganai	1,066	2.07%	New
JKPC	Dr. Manzoor Ahmad Bhat	987	1.91%	▼2.99
NOTA	None of the Above	341	0.66%	New
Margin of victory		20,356	39.49%	▲30.86
Turnout		51,553	45.69%	▲14.90
Registered electors		1,12,829		▲8.72
JKNC gain from INC		Swing	▲25.94	

=== Assembly Election 2014 ===
2014 Jammu and Kashmir Legislative Assembly election : Sopore
Party	Candidate	Votes	%	±%
INC	Abdul Rashid Dar	8,429	26.38%	▲8.04
JKPDP	Nazir Ahmad Naikoo	5,674	17.76%	▲4.68
Independent	Irshad Rasool Kar	5,324	16.66%	New
JKNC	Mohammed Ashraf Ganie	4,079	12.77%	▼11.48
JKPC	Mohmmad Ramzan Baba	1,567	4.90%	New
Independent	Shahzad Aasim	1,394	4.36%	New
Independent	Mohammed Abdullah Dar	1,208	3.78%	New
Independent	Ghulam Mohmad War	1,182	3.70%	New
Independent	Zahid Gani Mircha	1,022	3.20%	New
Independent	Sajad Mohi Ud Din Sheikh	545	1.71%	New
Independent	Ghulam Rasool Dar	511	1.60%	New
Margin of victory		2,755	8.62%	▲2.72
Turnout		31,952	30.79%	▲10.83
Registered electors		1,03,782		▲14.98
INC gain from JKNC		Swing	▲2.14	

=== Assembly Election 2008 ===
2008 Jammu and Kashmir Legislative Assembly election : Sopore
Party	Candidate	Votes	%	±%
JKNC	Mohammed Ashraf Ganie	4,368	24.24%	▼0.14
INC	Abdul Rashid Dar	3,304	18.34%	▼14.86
JKPDP	Abdul Khaliq Bhat	2,357	13.08%	▼11.06
Independent	Ghulam Rasool Kar	1,555	8.63%	New
Independent	Kifayat Hussain Mir	922	5.12%	New
Independent	Nazir Ahmad Naikoo	840	4.66%	New
Independent	Ghulam Mohamad Mir	563	3.12%	New
JKANC	Ghulam Rasool Shah	551	3.06%	New
Jammu & Kashmir Democratic Party Nationalist	Mohammed Abdullah Dar	527	2.93%	New
Independent	Ghulam Nabi Lone	422	2.34%	New
Independent	Khazir Mohammed Ganie	421	2.34%	New
Margin of victory		1,064	5.91%	▼2.90
Turnout		18,017	19.96%	▲11.87
Registered electors		90,259		▲17.56
JKNC gain from INC		Swing	▼8.95	

=== Assembly Election 2002 ===
2002 Jammu and Kashmir Legislative Assembly election : Sopore
Party	Candidate	Votes	%	±%
INC	Abdul Rashid Dar	2,062	33.19%	▲20.51
JKNC	Abdul Ahad Vakil	1,515	24.39%	▼40.08
JKPDP	Ghulam Mohamad Mir	1,500	24.15%	New
Independent	Abdul Rehman Lone	588	9.47%	New
JD(U)	Ghulam Nabi Sofi	294	4.73%	New
Independent	Wali Mohmmad Trukroo	253	4.07%	New
Margin of victory		547	8.81%	▼42.98
Turnout		6,212	8.09%	▼26.64
Registered electors		76,779		▲19.05
INC gain from JKNC		Swing	▼31.27	

=== Assembly Election 1996 ===
1996 Jammu and Kashmir Legislative Assembly election : Sopore
Party	Candidate	Votes	%	±%
JKNC	Abdul Ahad Vakil	14,441	64.47%	▲20.12
INC	Ghulam Nabi Mircha	2,842	12.69%	New
JD	Ghulam Nabi Sofi	1,734	7.74%	New
Independent	Ghulam Nabi Lone	1,257	5.61%	New
Independent	Ghulam Mohammed Malik	1,091	4.87%	New
Independent	Abdul Rashid Wani	1,035	4.62%	New
Margin of victory		11,599	51.78%	▲41.89
Turnout		22,400	38.02%	▼47.93
Registered electors		64,495		▲18.55
JKNC gain from Independent		Swing	▲10.23	

=== Assembly Election 1987 ===
1987 Jammu and Kashmir Legislative Assembly election : Sopore
Party	Candidate	Votes	%	±%
Independent	Syed Ali Shah Geelani	24,392	54.24%	New
JKNC	Abdul Ahmad Vakil	19,942	44.35%	▼1.63
JKNC	Ghulam Nabi Ganai	636	1.41%	▼44.57
Margin of victory		4,450	9.90%	▼1.09
Turnout		44,970	84.75%	▲1.95
Registered electors		54,401		▲18.43
Independent gain from JKNC		Swing		

=== Assembly Election 1983 ===
1983 Jammu and Kashmir Legislative Assembly election : Sopore
Party	Candidate	Votes	%	±%
JKNC	Hakeem Habibullah	17,048	45.98%	▼3.06
JI	Syed Ali Shah Geelani	12,974	34.99%	▼14.15
INC	Ghulam Rasool Kar	6,582	17.75%	New
JKNC	Mohammed Alyas	473	1.28%	▼47.77
Margin of victory		4,074	10.99%	▲10.89
Turnout		37,077	83.57%	▼3.06
Registered electors		45,937		▲13.12
JKNC gain from JI		Swing	▼3.16	

=== Assembly Election 1977 ===
1977 Jammu and Kashmir Legislative Assembly election : Sopore
Party	Candidate	Votes	%	±%
JI	Syed Ali Shah Geelani	16,717	49.14%	▼11.21
JKNC	Hakeem Habibullah	16,684	49.04%	New
Independent	Abdul Khaliq Tak	456	1.34%	New
Margin of victory		33	0.10%	▼20.61
Turnout		34,019	85.90%	▲22.01
Registered electors		40,609		▲32.84
JI hold		Swing		

=== Assembly Election 1972 ===
1972 Jammu and Kashmir Legislative Assembly election : Sopore
Party	Candidate	Votes	%	±%
JI	Syed Ali Shah Geelani	11,396	60.35%	New
INC	Ghulam Nabi Mircha	7,486	39.65%	▼17.00
Margin of victory		3,910	20.71%	▲3.26
Turnout		18,882	65.22%	▲31.83
Registered electors		30,570		▲16.89
JI gain from INC		Swing		

=== Assembly Election 1967 ===
1967 Jammu and Kashmir Legislative Assembly election : Sopore
Party	Candidate	Votes	%	±%
INC	Ghulam Nabi Mircha	4,434	56.64%	New
JKNC	A. G. Panzoo	3,068	39.19%	New
ABJS	F. M. Zaki	326	4.16%	New
Margin of victory		1,366	17.45%	
Turnout		7,828	30.90%	▲29.93
Registered electors		26,152		▲6.83
INC gain from JKNC		Swing		

=== Assembly Election 1962 ===
1962 Jammu and Kashmir Legislative Assembly election : Sopore
Party	Candidate	Votes	%	±%
JKNC	Abdul Ghani Malik	Unopposed		
Registered electors		24,481		
JKNC win (new seat)				

== See also ==
- Sopore
- Baramulla district
- List of constituencies of Jammu and Kashmir Legislative Assembly
