= Hom Shali Bugh Assembly constituency =

Constituency of the Jammu and Kashmir Legislative Assembly

Coordinates: 33.744°N 75.015°E

Hom Shali Bagh
- Former constituency for the Jammu and Kashmir Legislative Assembly

Constituency details
- Country: India
- State: Jammu and Kashmir
- District: Kulgam
- Established: 1977
- Abolished: 2018

Hom Shali Bagh was a legislative constituency in the Jammu and Kashmir Legislative Assembly of Jammu and Kashmir a north state of India. Hom Shali Bugh was also part of Anantnag Lok Sabha constituency until its dissolution.

== Members of the Legislative Assembly ==
Year	Member	Party
1977	Abdul Salam Deva	Jammu & Kashmir National Conference
1983	Abdul Salam Deva	Jammu & Kashmir National Conference
1987	Ghulam Nabi Sumji	Independent politician
1996	Gul Mohammed Rafiqui	Jammu & Kashmir National Conference
2002	Abdul Gafar Sofi	Jammu and Kashmir People's Democratic Party
2008	Abdul Gafar Sofi	Jammu and Kashmir People's Democratic Party
2014	Abdul Majeed	Jammu & Kashmir National Conference

== Election results ==
=== Assembly Election 2014 ===
2014 Jammu and Kashmir Legislative Assembly election : Hom Shali Bugh
Party	Candidate	Votes	%	±%
JKNC	Abdul Majeed Bhat (Larmi)	11,406	40.00%	▲19.51
JKPDP	Abdul Gafar Sofi	10,137	35.55%	▲1.81
INC	Anayatulla Rather	3,822	13.40%	▼0.98
BJP	Ghulam Nabi Dar	1,527	5.35%	New
Independent	Abdul Bary Naik	702	2.46%	New
SP	Mohammed Amin Bhat	305	1.07%	New
BSP	Bashir Ahmad Bhat	246	0.86%	New
NOTA	None of the Above	233	0.82%	New
Margin of victory		1,269	4.45%	▼8.80
Turnout		28,518	37.56%	▼16.80
Registered electors		75,936		▲13.68
JKNC gain from JKPDP		Swing	▲6.26	

=== Assembly Election 2008 ===
2008 Jammu and Kashmir Legislative Assembly election : Hom Shali Bugh
Party	Candidate	Votes	%	±%
JKPDP	Abdul Gafar Sofi	12,249	33.74%	▼24.85
JKNC	Abdul Majeed	7,439	20.49%	▲5.30
INC	Anayatullah Rather	5,223	14.38%	▲10.30
CPI(M)	Mohammad Amin Dar	3,782	10.42%	▼9.62
Independent	Abdul Rehman Malla	3,730	10.27%	New
Independent	Ghulam Nabi Dar	1,219	3.36%	New
JKNPP	Manzoor Ahmed Wani	644	1.77%	New
Independent	Nazir Ahmed Lone	521	1.43%	New
JKANC	Ghulam Mohammad Itoo	447	1.23%	New
Independent	Mohammad Ayub Shiekh	367	1.01%	New
Margin of victory		4,810	13.25%	▼25.30
Turnout		36,309	54.36%	▲31.43
Registered electors		66,796		▲31.92
JKPDP hold		Swing	▼24.85	

=== Assembly Election 2002 ===
2002 Jammu and Kashmir Legislative Assembly election : Hom Shali Bugh
Party	Candidate	Votes	%	±%
JKPDP	Abdul Gafar Sofi	6,803	58.59%	New
CPI(M)	Mohammed Amin Dar	2,327	20.04%	New
JKNC	Firdous Ahmad	1,764	15.19%	▼17.01
INC	Mohammed Ramzan Bhat	474	4.08%	▼16.90
BJP	Ghulam Mohammed Tantray	244	2.10%	▼1.95
Margin of victory		4,476	38.55%	▲28.03
Turnout		11,612	22.93%	▼19.72
Registered electors		50,635		▲18.62
JKPDP gain from JKNC		Swing	▲26.39	

=== Assembly Election 1996 ===
1996 Jammu and Kashmir Legislative Assembly election : Hom Shali Bugh
Party	Candidate	Votes	%	±%
JKNC	Gul Mohammed Rafiqui	5,863	32.20%	▼7.32
JKAL	Mohammed Sikander	3,948	21.68%	New
JD	Anaatullah Khan	3,838	21.08%	New
INC	Abdul Gafar Sofi	3,821	20.99%	New
BJP	Mohammed Sardar	738	4.05%	New
Margin of victory		1,915	10.52%	▼8.17
Turnout		18,208	46.58%	▼38.08
Registered electors		42,685		▼3.94
JKNC gain from Independent		Swing	▼26.02	

=== Assembly Election 1987 ===
1987 Jammu and Kashmir Legislative Assembly election : Hom Shali Bugh
Party	Candidate	Votes	%	±%
Independent	Ghulam Nabi Sumji	20,886	58.22%	New
JKNC	Abdul Salam Deva	14,180	39.52%	▼6.84
Independent	Gulzar	676	1.88%	New
Margin of victory		6,706	18.69%	▼1.64
Turnout		35,877	84.91%	▼1.16
Registered electors		44,437		▲22.70
Independent gain from JKNC		Swing		

=== Assembly Election 1983 ===
1983 Jammu and Kashmir Legislative Assembly election : Hom Shali Bugh
Party	Candidate	Votes	%	±%
JKNC	Abdul Salam Deva	13,752	46.37%	▼10.41
INC	Mufti Mohammed Syed	7,722	26.04%	▲16.82
JI	Abdul Razak Mir	7,118	24.00%	▼1.83
JKNC	Ghulam Hassan Mir	547	1.84%	▼54.93
Independent	Abdul Aziz Ganai	310	1.05%	New
Independent	Bashir Ahmed	211	0.71%	New
Margin of victory		6,030	20.33%	▼10.61
Turnout		29,660	85.01%	▲2.43
Registered electors		36,217		▲26.07
JKNC hold		Swing	▼10.41	

=== Assembly Election 1977 ===
1977 Jammu and Kashmir Legislative Assembly election : Hom Shali Bugh
Party	Candidate	Votes	%	±%
JKNC	Abdul Salam Deva	12,959	56.77%	New
JI	Ali Mohammed Dar	5,897	25.83%	New
INC	Abdul Rahman Dar	2,104	9.22%	New
JP	Ghulam Mohi-Ud-Din Sawal	1,867	8.18%	New
Margin of victory		7,062	30.94%	
Turnout		22,827	81.79%	
Registered electors		28,727		
JKNC win (new seat)				
