= Abdul Haq Khan =

Pakistani politician

Adviser on Inter Provincial Coordination to Chief Minister of Khyber Pakhtunkhwa
- In office 19 June 2013 – 28 May 2018
- Constituency: PK-61 Kohistan-I

Personal details
- Born: 25 June 1967 (age 59) Kohistan District
- Party: PTI (2013-present)
- Occupation: Politician

Haji Abdul Haq Khan (Urdu: حاجى عبدالحق خان; borne 25 June 1967) is a Pakistani politician hailing from Pattan, Kohistan District belonging to Pakistan Tehreek-e-Insaf. He served as Adviser to the chief minister on Inter Provincial Coordination and member of the assembly in the 10th Khyber Pakhtunkhwa Assembly. In the 2013 general election Abdul Haq Khan was elected as independent from PK-61 Kohistan-I and later joined Pakistan Tehreek-e-Insaf (PTI).

Haji Abdul Haq Khan got his degree in Bachelor of Arts.
