= Jammu and Kashmir Grant of Permit for Resettlement in or (Permanent Return) to the State Act, 1982 =

Jammu and Kashmir Legislative Assembly
- Long title: An Act to provide for regulation of procedure for grant of permit for resettlement in or (permanent return) to the State, of the permanent residents of the State.
- Territorial extent: Jammu and Kashmir
- Enacted by: Jammu and Kashmir Legislative Assembly
- Assented to: 6 October 1982
- Commenced: 7 October 1982
- Introduced by: a member of NC
- Introduced: 8 March 1980

Summary
- Stayed by Supreme court of India
- Status: Not yet in force

The Jammu and Kashmir Grant of Permit for Resettlement in or (Permanent Return) to the State Act of 1982 is a law passed by the Jammu and Kashmir Legislative Assembly that was enacted to facilitate the return and permanent resettlement of people who left Jammu and Kashmir and migrated after the first day of March 1947 to the territory now included in Pakistan and before the fourteenth day of May 1954.

== History ==
This bill was moved in the Assembly on 8 March 1980, by a member of the ruling National Conference (NC) party. When the bill was passed all opposition members were absent from the assembly except for Congress(I). But then governor of J&K, B.K. Nehru returned the bill for reconsideration. It was again passed by the assembly but by that time President Giani Zail Singh had already sent a presidential reference to the Supreme Court seeking its opinion on the law's constitutional validity. Later Atal Bihari Vajpayee, also filed a petition before the apex court seeking intervention. This matter was later listed before the constitutional bench of Supreme Court of India on a presidential reference and was later returned to president with a three-word pronouncement: ‘Returned, respectfully, unanswered’. Bhim Singh filed a writ petition before the Supreme Court to quash the 'Resettlement Bill'. The bill has been pending for hearing in Supreme Court since 2018.

== Provisions ==
This bill allows a State Subject of Class I or of Class II to return and permanently resettle, who left Kashmir and migrated after the first day of March, 1947 to the territory now included in Pakistan and before the fourteenth day of May, 1954. In order to avail benefits of this bill the person who is applying for resettlement has to go through a proper inquiry by a 'Competent Authority'. After which if the state government is satisfied with the application and the recommendation of Competent Authority prescribe, the person to be eligible for resettlement in the State.

== See also ==
- Jammu and Kashmir
- Article 370
- Constitution of Jammu and Kashmir
