= Victoria Schofield =

British author and historian

Rosemary Victoria Schofield (born 15 September 1950) is a British author, biographer, and historian. Her most recent books are a memoir of her thirty year friendship with Benazir Bhutto, a two volume history of the Black Watch and a biography of Sir John Wheeler-Bennett. She also wrote the first full-length biography of Field Marshal Archibald Wavell and edited a memoir of his life and naval career by her late father Vice Admiral Brian Schofield. She regularly contributes to British national and specialist media.

== Life and career ==
Born in Washington, D.C. in 1950, one of the daughters of Vice-Admiral Brian Betham Schofield and his third wife Grace Mildred Seale, Schofield was educated at the Royal Naval School for Girls, and at Lady Margaret Hall (LMH) of Oxford University, from which she holds a degree in Modern History. At LMH she was a close friend of Benazir Bhutto, whom she succeeded as President of the Oxford Union Society in the Trinity term of 1977. She was the Alistair Horne visiting fellow at St Antony's College, Oxford, in 2004–2005.

In 1982, Schofield married Stephen Willis, and she has three adult children.

== Published works ==
- Bhutto: Trial and Execution. London: Cassell, 1979. ISBN 9780304305391.
- The United Nations: People, Politics, and Power. Hove: Wayland, 1979. ISBN 9780853406563.
- Every Rock, Every Hill: The Plain Tale of the North-West Frontier and Afghanistan. London: Pimlico, 1984, 1987. ISBN 978-0712616256.
- Kashmir in the Crossfire. London, Tauris, 1996. ISBN 9781860640360.
- (ed.) Old Roads, New Highways: Fifty Years of Pakistan. Oxford: Oxford University Press, 1998. ISBN 9780195778458.
- The House That Fell Down: A Diary of a Domestic Disaster. London: John Murray, 2001. ISBN 9780719563294.
- Wavell: Soldier and Statesman. London: John Murray, 2006. ISBN 9780719563201.
- Afghan Frontier: Feuding and Fighting in Central Asia / At the Crossroads of Conflict. London: Tauris Parke, 2003, 2010. ISBN 9781417556922.
- Kashmir in Conflict: India, Pakistan, and the Unending War. London: Tauris, 2000, 2003, 2010, 2021. ISBN 9780755607181.
- Witness to History: The Life of John Wheeler-Bennett. New Haven: Yale University Press, 2012. ISBN 9780300179019.
- The Highland Furies: The Black Watch 1739-1899. London: Quercus, 2012. ISBN 9781849165501.
- The Black Watch: Fighting in the Front Line, 1899-2006. London: Head of Zeus, 2017. ISBN 9781784979973.
- With The Royal Navy in War and Peace: O'er the Dark Blue Sea (Editor). Yorkshire: Pen & Sword, 2018. ISBN 9781526736475
- The Fragrance of Tears: My Friendship with Benazir Bhutto. London: Apollo, 2020. ISBN 9781789544459.
- The Rescue Ships and the Convoys, Saving Lives during the Second World War. (Editor & Author) Yorkshire: Pen & Sword, 2024, ISBN 1036102661
