= Wachi Assembly constituency =

Constituency of the Jammu and Kashmir legislative assembly in India

Coordinates: 33.80°N 75.04°E

Wachi
- Former constituency for the Jammu and Kashmir Legislative Assembly

Constituency details
- Country: India
- Region: North India
- State: Jammu and Kashmir
- District: Shopian
- Established: 1987
- Abolished: 2018

Wachi was a legislative constituency of Jammu and Kashmir Legislative Assembly in the Jammu and Kashmir, a region formerly administered by India as a state from 1952 to 2019. Wachi assembly constituency was a part of Shopian, a hill district of the union territory. It was officially replaced and renamed as the Zainapora Assembly constituency in May 2022 after the parliament of India introduced Jammu and Kashmir Reorganisation Act, 2019.

== Members ==
| Year | Member | Party |
|---|---|---|
| 1987 | Nazir Ahmad Wani | Jammu & Kashmir National Conference |
| 1996 | Mohammad Jabar Mir | Jammu & Kashmir National Conference |
| 2002 | Mohammad Khalil Naik | Communist Party of India |
| 2008 | Mehbooba Mufti | Jammu and Kashmir People's Democratic Party |
| 2014 | Aijaz Ahmad Mir | Jammu and Kashmir People's Democratic Party |

== Election results ==
=== 2014 ===
2014 Jammu and Kashmir Legislative Assembly election: Wachi
| Party | Candidate | Votes | % | ±% |
|---|---|---|---|---|
| JKPDP | Aijaz Ahmad Mir | | | |
| NOTA | None of the above | | | |
| Majority | | | | |
| Turnout | | | | |
| Registered electors | | | | |
