= Mehbooba Mufti ministry =

Jammu and Kashmir, India government (2016–2018)

- Ministry of State of Jammu and Kashmir
- no
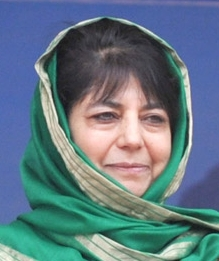
- Mehbooba Mufti; Hon'ble Chief Minister of Jammu and Kashmir
- Date formed: 4 April 2016
- Date dissolved: 19 June 2018

People and organisations
- Head of state: Governor; Satyapal Malik
- Head of government: Mehbooba Mufti
- No. of ministers: 24
- Member parties: BJP; Peoples Democratic Party
- Opposition party: JKNC
- Opposition leader: Omar Abdullah (assembly)

History
- Election: 2014
- Outgoing election: 2014
- Legislature term: 5 years
- Incoming formation: 2016
- Predecessor: Second Mufti Mohammad Sayeed ministry
- Successor: Second Omar Abdullah ministry (union territory)

The Mehbooba Mufti ministry was formed on 4 April 2016, following the elections of Jammu and Kashmir Legislative Assembly in 2016, with Mehbooba Mufti as Chief Minister. The list of ministers:

== Cabinet ministers ==
Portfolio	Minister	Took office	Left office	Party
Chief Minister; Other departments not allocated to any Minister	Mehbooba Mufti	4 April 2016	19 June 2018	JKPDP
Public Works; Parliamentary affairs	Abdul Rehman Veeri	4 April 2016	19 June 2018	JKPDP
Rural Development; Panchayati Raj; Law & Justice	Abdul Haq Khan	4 April 2016	19 June 2018	JKPDP
Food, Civil supplies and Consumer Affairs	Chowdhary Zulfkar Ali	4 April 2016	19 June 2018	JKPDP
Finance; Culture; Labour & Employment	Haseeb Drabu	4 April 2016	19 June 2018	JKPDP
Revenue; Disaster Management; Relief; Rehabilitation and Reconstruction	Syed Basharat Ahmed Bukhari	4 April 2016	19 June 2018	JKPDP
Education	Naeem Akhtar	4 April 2016	19 June 2018	JKPDP
Information Technology; Technolical Education and Youth Services & Sports; Narmada Valley Development; Aviation Department	Imran Raza Ansari	4 April 2016	19 June 2018	JKPDP
Education; Finance	Altaf Bukhari	4 April 2016	19 June 2018	JKPDP
Deputy Chief Minister; Power Development and housing and urban development	Nirmal Kumar Singh	4 April 2016	19 June 2018	BJP
Industries and Commerce	Chander Prakash	4 April 2016	19 June 2018	BJP
Health and Medical Education	Bali Bhagat	4 April 2016	19 June 2018	BJP
General Administration; Public Relations; Narmada Valley Development; Aviation Department	Lal Singh	4 April 2016	19 June 2018	BJP
Cooperation and Ladakh Affairs	Chering Dorje	4 April 2016	19 June 2018	BJP
Animal, Sheep Husbandary and Fisheries	Abdul Gani Kohli	4 April 2016	19 June 2018	BJP
PHE, Irrigation and Flood Control	Sham Lal Choudhary	4 April 2016	19 June 2018	BJP
Social Welfare, ARI & Tranings and Science & Technology	Sajjad Lone	4 April 2016	19 June 2018	JKPC

== Ministers of state ==
Portfolio	Minister	Took office	Left office	Party
Housing & Urban Development Social Welfare, Health & Medical Education	Asiya Naqash	4 April 2016	19 June 2018	JKPDP
Haj & Auqaf (Independent charge), PHE and Irrigation & Flood Control, Power Development, Industries & Commerce	Farooq Ahmad Andrabi	4 April 2016	19 June 2018	JKPDP
Forest, Ecology and Environment, Animal & Sheep Husbandry, Cooperative and Fisheries	Zahoor Ahmad Mir	4 April 2016	19 June 2018	JKPDP
Transport (Independent charge), Revenue, Public Works (Roads & Buildings), Rural Development & Panchayati Raj, Agriculture Production, YSS	Sunil Kumar Sharma	4 April 2016	19 June 2018	BJP
Education, Technical Education, Culture, Tourism, Department of Horticulture, Floriculture and Parks	Priya Sethi	4 April 2016	19 June 2018	BJP
Finance and Planning, Information Technology, Law, Justice and Parliamentary Affairs, CA and PD, Tribal Affairs, Relief & Rehabilitation and L&Emp	Ajay Nanda	4 April 2016	19 June 2018	BJP

== See also ==
- First Mufti Mohammad Sayeed ministry
- Second Mufti Mohammad Sayeed ministry
- First Omar Abdullah ministry
- Second Omar Abdullah ministry
- Ghulam Nabi Azad ministry
