= Omar Abdullah ministry =

Omar Abdullah ministry may refer to these cabinets headed by Indian politician Omar Abdullah as chief minister of Jammu and Kashmir:

- First Omar Abdullah ministry (as state 2009–2014)
- Second Omar Abdullah ministry (as union territory 2024–present)
