= Ghulam Mohammad Saroori =

Indian politician

G. M. Saroori
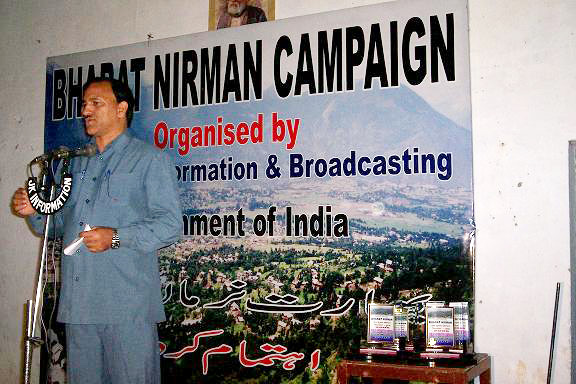
- G.M. Saroori speaking on "PM’s New 15 Point Programme Welfare of Minorities", at the Bharat Nirman Public Information Campaign, in Kishtwar, Doda, Jammu & Kashmir on 2 September 2006

Cabinet Minister, Government of Jammu and Kashmir
- In office 11 July 2009 – 26 August 2010
- Governor: N. N. Vohra
- Chief Minister: Omar Abdullah
- Ministry and Departments: Mechanical Engineering; Roads & Buildings
- Preceded by: Omar Abdullah
- Succeeded by: Omar Abdullah

Minister of State, Government of Jammu and Kashmir
- In office 1 January 2008 – 11 July 2008
- Governor: S. K. Sinha; N. N. Vohra
- Chief Minister: Ghulam Nabi Azad
- Ministry and Departments: Tourism; Forest; School Education; Social Welfare; Consumer Affairs & Public Distribution

MLA of Jammu and Kashmir Legislative Assembly
- In office 2002–2018
- Preceded by: Qazi Jalaluddin
- Succeeded by: Payare Lal Sharma
- Constituency: Inderwal

Personal details
- Born: 1 January 1955 (age 71) Sarthal, Kishtwar district, Jammu and Kashmir, India
- Party: Indian National Congress (until 2022; 2025–present)
- Other political affiliations: Democratic Progressive Azad Party (2022–2025); Independent
- Children: 5
- Awards: Best Legislators Award 2014—15

Ghulam Mohammad Saroori, also known as G. M. Saroori, is an Indian politician and a former legislator of the Jammu and Kashmir Legislative Assembly, who represented the Inderwal constituency of Kishtwar district from 2002 to 2018 until the coalition government was ended in the state of Jammu and Kashmir.

Saroori was affiliated with the Indian National Congress until August 2022, during which he also served as its vice-president. He later briefly joined the Democratic Azad Party following its formation in September 2022, but rejoined the Congress on 28 June 2025. In 2008, he was appointed a Minister of State for Tourism, Forest, School Education, Social Welfare and Consumer Affairs & Public Distribution, and later served as the Minister for Mechanical Engineering and Roads & Buildings from 2009 to 2010.

== Early life ==
Ghulam Mohammad Saroori was born to Saidullah Saroori, who served as the sarpanch of the Sarthal panchayat for 32 years. He worked for the Consumer Affairs and Public Distribution Department for two months before becoming a businessman alongside his father. He and his family migrated to Kishtwar between 1992 and 1993 due to the militancy in the region. He fathered three daughters and two sons.

== Political career ==
Saroori became associated with Nirmala Deshpande who was a social worker and Gandhian.

He first contested in the assembly elections as an independent candidate from the Inderwal Assembly constituency in 1996, losing by nearly 200 votes. He was elected as a Member of the Legislative Assembly consecutively in the 2002, 2008 and 2014 elections as a member of the Indian National Congress.

On 1 January 2008, he was appointed the Minister of State for Tourism, Forest, School Education, Social Welfare and Consumer Affairs & Public Distribution under the state government of Ghulam Nabi Azad. He played a key role in defusing the communal tension after the theft of an idol from the Mata Sarthal Devi Mandir by getting the culprits arrested.

Saroori was appointed the Minister for Roads & Buildings and Mechanical Engineering under the coalition government of Jammu & Kashmir National Conference and Congress led by Omar Abdullah on 11 July 2009. He was asked by the Congress to resign from his post after a scandal involving the alleged use of an impersonator appearing on his daughter's behalf in an examination, but he ignored it and left for Jeddah to perform umrah on 25 August 2010. The state government decided to dismiss him on the following day. He was however cleared of all charges by the Central Bureau of Investigation in August 2012.

A complaint was lodged with the State Accountability Commission against Saroori in October 2012 over alleged allotments of around 2,000 tenders during his tenure as the Minister of Roads & Buildings. He was however cleared of all charges in February 2014 as they stemmed from the period of April—June 2009 when Abdullah held the portfolio.

Saroori was appointed a vice-president for the state unit of the Congress in March 2015. He was conferred the Best Legislator Award for the year 2014–15 by Chief Minister Mehbooba Mufti in 2016. In February 2020, he was summoned by the National Investigation Agency over allegations of him being linked to a Hizbul Mujahideen commander named Jehangir Saroori. He was later exonerated by the agency.

Saroori quit the Congress along with seven other leaders on 26 August 2022 after the resignation of Azad from the party. He contested the 2024 Jammu and Kashmir Legislative Assembly election as an independent candidate to independent candidate Payare Lal Sharma by a margin of 643 votes He joined the Democratic Azad Party launched by Azad on 26 September 2022. He lost his seat in 2024. On 28 June 2025, he returned to the Indian National Congress at a ceremony in Srinagar attended by senior party leaders. His comeback was viewed as a boost for the Congress in Jammu and Kashmir and a setback for the Democratic Progressive Azad Party.
