= Altaf Bukhari =

Indian Politician and Businessman

President of Jammu and Kashmir Apni Party
- Incumbent
- Assumed office 2020
- Preceded by: Position established

Member of Jammu and Kashmir Legislative Assembly
- In office 2015–2018
- Succeeded by: Constituency abolished
- Constituency: Amira Kadal

Minister for Roads and Buildings of Jammu and Kashmir
- In office 2015–2016

Minister for Floriculture, Gardens and Parks
- In office 2015–2016

Minister for Education of Jammu and Kashmir
- In office 4 April 2016 – June 2018

Minister for Labour and Employment of Jammu and Kashmir
- In office March 2018 – June 2018

Minister for Finance of Jammu and Kashmir
- In office 4 April 2016 – 19 June 2018

Personal details
- Born: 19 February 1958 (age 68) Srinagar, Jammu and Kashmir
- Party: Jammu and Kashmir Apni Party(2020-Present); People's Democratic Party(until 2020)
- Occupation: Politician, Businessperson

Syed Mohammad Altaf Bukhari is an Indian politician hailing from Jammu and Kashmir. He is the president of the Jammu and Kashmir Apni Party, a political organization, which he launched in 2020. He served as the member of Jammu and Kashmir Legislative Assembly from 2015 to 2018, representing the defunct Amira Kadal Assembly constituency. He served as the education minister of Jammu and Kashmir and later assumed the additional responsibility of the Finance, Labour and Employment ministry.

== Early life and education ==
He holds a Bachelor's degree in Agricultural science from Government Agriculture College in Wadura-Sopore, obtained in 1980 through Kashmir University. His father, Syed Mohammad Iqbal Bukhari, was a noted businessman and the founder of FIL Industries.

== Career ==
In 2014, Altaf Bukhari won the assembly election from the Amira Kadal Assembly constituency, representing the Jammu and Kashmir Peoples Democratic Party. Subsequently, in 2015, he was appointed as Roads and Buildings minister in the Mufti Mohammad Sayeed-led PDP-BJP coalition. He also served as the minister for Floriculture, Gardens and Parks in the Mufti Mohammad Sayeed ministry. However, upon Sayeed's death in 2016, Bukhari was not included in the cabinet when Mehbooba Mufti assumed office.

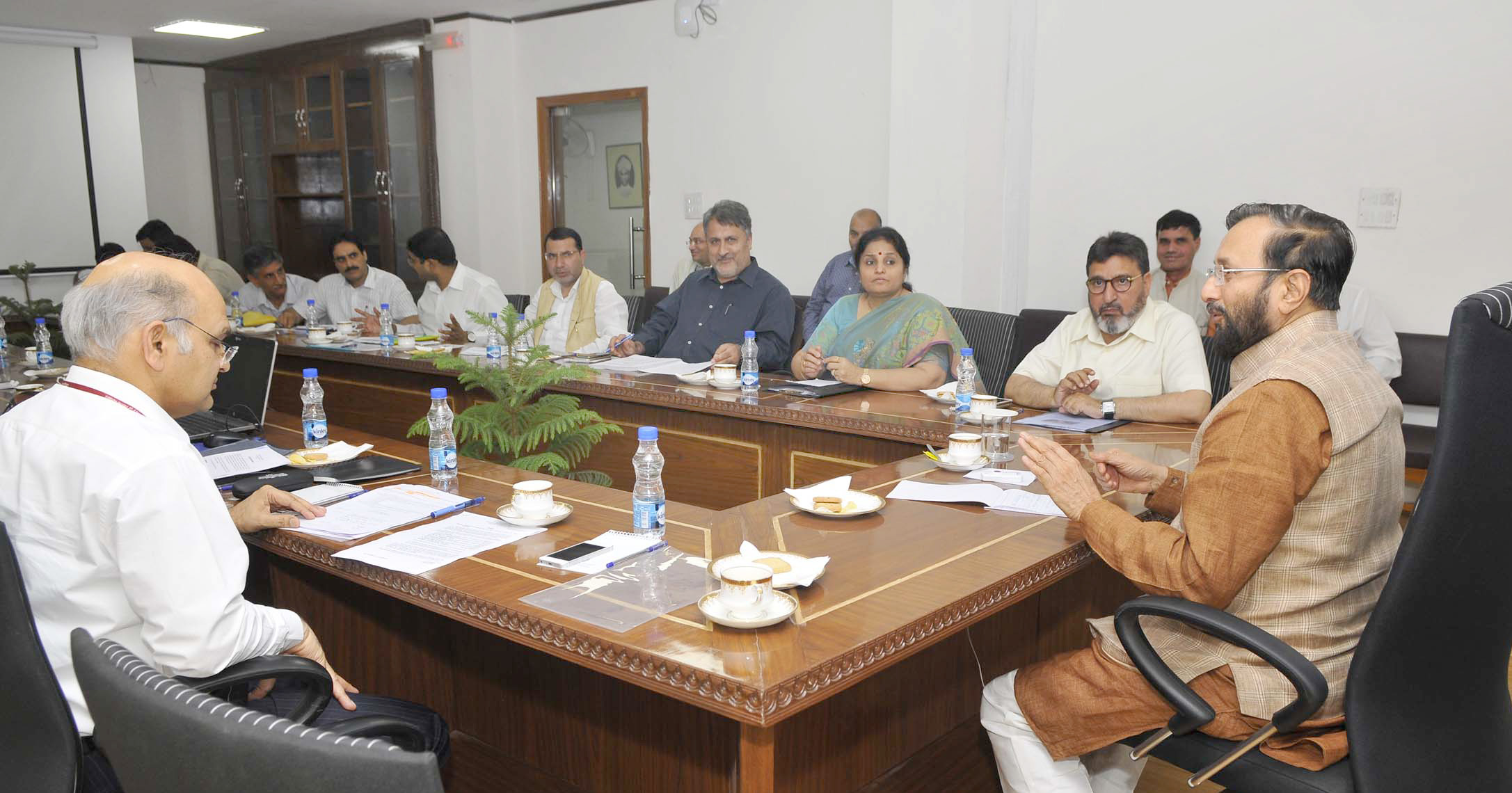
A delegation led by the minister for Education Altaf Bukhari meeting the union minister for HRD, Prakash Javadekar, in New Delhi on May 3, 2017.

In February 2017, Bukhari was appointed as the minister for Education in the government. Later, in March 2018, he was assigned the additional responsibility of the Finance Ministry, the Ministry of Labour and Employment in the state government.

When the BJP-PDP coalition government dissolved in June 2018, Bukhari emerged as a consensus candidate for chief minister, backed by the PDP, the Congress, and the Jammu & Kashmir National Conference in November 2018.

He formed his own party called Jammu and Kashmir Apni Party on 8 March 2020, nearly a year after being expelled from the PDP.

He has been granted Z+ level security, which is the highest level of security provided by the Indian government.

=== Business ===
His family runs FIL Industries Limited, a conglomerate with interests in agriculture, food and beverages, tourism, hospitality, and mountain infrastructure development. He also previously served as the CEO of FIL Industries. The company was established by his father. Initially, Altaf Bukhari took over the pesticide business and expanded its operations across different parts of the country. Notably, FIL Industries Limited is the only private entity collaborating with German partners in the processing of apples.

He is credited with introducing controlled atmosphere storage (CAS) in Kashmir and providing assistance to the Container Corporation of India in establishing a 12,000-tonne CAS facility in Haryana.

=== Alliance to Hurriyat Party ===
Jammu and Kashmir Apni Party President Altaf Bukhari in talks with Hurriyat leaders to join party. The J&K Apni Party (JKAP) has opened channels of communication with a senior separatist leader, associated with the Hurriyat, to join the party in Srinagar. Earlier, an officer bearer associated with Hurriyat leader Masroor Abbas Ansari, who heads the Jammu & Kashmir Ittihadul Muslimeen, joined the JKAP. Mr. Ansari, taking a strong note of the development, said:

Denial and deviation from the fundamental principles of our organization was not acceptable under any circumstances. We are committed to save the credibility of the party and the principles of our Late founder in particular. Any person holding any position will be thrown out from the party if he acts contrary to the organizational constitution and fundamental rules.”

Maulana Masroor Ansari Tweeted.

An emergency meeting of the core committee of the Jammu and Kashmir Ittehad Muslimeen was held under the chairmanship of Maulana Masroor Abbas Ansari, the president of the organization, in which using the powers given to the president in the constitution, the organization's Majlis-e-Administrator Working Committee) was dissolved and a new one was formed. An ad-hoc committee consisting of only 5 members was constituted till the election of the working committee and office-bearers. In this emergency meeting, the resignation of General Secretary Syed Muzaffar Rizvi was also approved.

=== Other engagements ===
- He has held positions on the Board of Directors of the National Horticulture Board and on the Board of Governors of the Indian Institute of Technology, Delhi.
- He has also served as a member of the Management Board of the Sher-e-Kashmir University of Agricultural Sciences & Technology of Jammu.
- Various news reports suggest that Altaf Bukhari, then aged 24, played a key role in the ousting of Farooq Abdullah's government in 1984. As a result, Farooq Abdullah was replaced by his brother-in-law, Ghulam Mohammad Shah as the new chief minister. It is believed that Bukhari acted as a mediator between the central government led by Indira Gandhi and the 13 rebel MLAs, who broke away from the National Conference and formed a new political party, Awami National Conference.
