= Payare Lal Sharma =

Indian politician

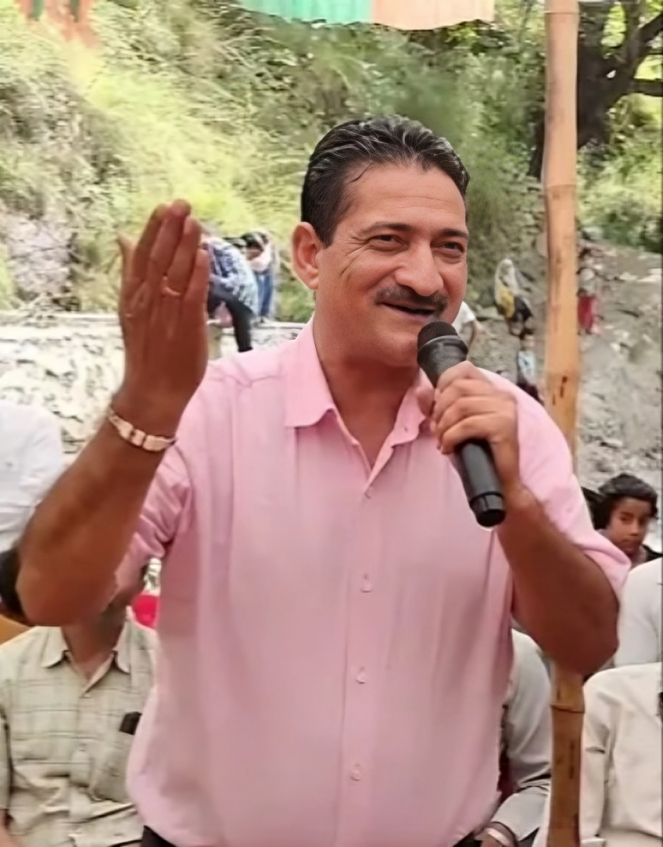
- Payare Lal Sharma

Member of the Jammu and Kashmir Legislative Assembly
- Incumbent
- Assumed office 8 October 2024
- Preceded by: Ghulam Mohammad Saroori
- Constituency: Inderwal Assembly constituency

Personal details
- Political party: Jammu & Kashmir National Conference
- Profession: Politician

Payare Lal Sharma is an Indian politician from Jammu & Kashmir. He is a Member of the Jammu & Kashmir Legislative Assembly from 2024, representing Inderwal Assembly constituency as an Independent candidate. He rejoined the Jammu and Kashmir National Conference after his victory and extended his support to the Second Omar Abdullah ministry to form the government.

== Political career ==
Sharma left the National Conference party after being denied a ticket for the 2024 Jammu and Kashmir Legislative Assembly election. He subsequently contested the election as an independent candidate from the Inderwal constituency, winning by a narrow margin of 643 votes. Sharma defeated Ghulam Mohammad Saroori, a two-time winner of the seat, securing 14,192 votes, while Saroori received 13,552 votes.

After winning the election as an independent candidate, Sharma, along with four other independent MLAs, joined the National Conference party.

== See also ==
- 2024 Jammu & Kashmir Legislative Assembly election
- Jammu and Kashmir Legislative Assembly
