= Hazratbal Assembly constituency =

Constituency of the Jammu and Kashmir Legislative Assembly

Coordinates: 34.131°N 74.842°E

Hazratbal
- Constituency No. 19 for the Jammu and Kashmir Legislative Assembly

Constituency details
- Country: India
- State: Jammu and Kashmir
- District: Srinagar
- Lok Sabha constituency: Srinagar
- Established: 1951

Member of Legislative Assembly
- Incumbent Salman Sagar
- Party: Jammu and Kashmir National Conference
- Elected year: 2024

Hazratbal Assembly constituency is one of the 90 constituencies in the Jammu and Kashmir Legislative Assembly of Jammu and Kashmir a north state of India. Hazratbal is part of the Srinagar Lok Sabha constituency.

== Members of the Legislative Assembly ==
| Election | Member | Party |
|---|---|---|
| 1951 | Sheikh Abdullah | Jammu & Kashmir National Conference |
| 1962 | Mohammed Yahya Sidiqi | Jammu & Kashmir National Conference |
| 1967 | Mohammed Yahya Siddiqi | Jammu & Kashmir National Conference |
| 1972 | Sofi Ghulam Ahmed | Independent politician |
| 1977 | Hissam-Ud-Din Bandey | Jammu & Kashmir National Conference |
| 1983 | Hissam-Ud-Din Bandey | Jammu & Kashmir National Conference |
| 1987 | Mohammed Yasin Shah | Jammu & Kashmir National Conference |
| 1996 | Mohammed Syed Akhoon | Jammu & Kashmir National Conference |
| 2002 | Mohammed Syed Akhoon | Jammu & Kashmir National Conference |
| 2008 | Farooq Abdullah | Jammu & Kashmir National Conference |
| 2009 By-election | Sheikh Mustafa Kamal | Jammu & Kashmir National Conference |
| 2014 | Asiya Naqash | Jammu and Kashmir People's Democratic Party |
| 2024 | Salman Sagar | Jammu and Kashmir National Conference |

== Election results ==
=== Assembly Election 2024 ===
2024 Jammu and Kashmir Legislative Assembly election: Hazratbal
| Party | Candidate | Votes | % | ±% |
|---|---|---|---|---|
| JKNC | Salman Sagar | 18,890 | 51.52% | ▲18.18 |
| JKPDP | Asiya Naqash | 8,595 | 23.44% | ▼21.43 |
| DPAP | Peer Bilal Ahmad | 5,471 | 14.92% | New |
| Independent | Mohammed Maqbool Beigh | 827 | 2.26% | New |
| Independent | Faiz Ahmad Bhat | 703 | 1.92% | New |
| SP | Shahid Hassan | 342 | 0.93% | New |
| Jammu and Kashmir Nationalist People's Front | Basit Bashir Gagroo | 225 | 0.61% | New |
| NOTA | None of the Above | 732 | 2.00% | ▲0.57 |
| Margin of victory | | 10,295 | 28.08% | ▲16.55 |
| Turnout | | 36,668 | 32.58% | ▲3.04 |
| Registered electors | | 1,12,541 | | ▲12.70 |
| JKNC gain from JKPDP | | Swing | ▲6.65 | |

=== Assembly Election 2014 ===
2014 Jammu and Kashmir Legislative Assembly election: Hazratbal
| Party | Candidate | Votes | % | ±% |
|---|---|---|---|---|
| JKPDP | Asiya Naqash | 13,234 | 44.87% | ▲4.55 |
| JKNC | Mohammed Syed Akhoon | 9,834 | 33.34% | New |
| BJP | Masood Ul Hassan | 2,635 | 8.93% | New |
| Independent | Altaf Hussain Dar | 1,089 | 3.69% | New |
| INC | Syed Ahmad | 921 | 3.12% | New |
| Independent | Ghulam Nabi Dar | 348 | 1.18% | New |
| Rashtriya Jankranti Party | Mirza Sajad Hussain | 272 | 0.92% | New |
| NOTA | None of the Above | 422 | 1.43% | New |
| Margin of victory | | 3,400 | 11.53% | ▲2.59 |
| Turnout | | 29,497 | 29.54% | ▲9.65 |
| Registered electors | | 99,857 | | ▲14.35 |
| JKPDP gain from JKNC | | Swing | ▼4.38 | |

=== Assembly By-election 2009 ===
2009 Jammu and Kashmir Legislative Assembly by-election: Hazratbal
| Party | Candidate | Votes | % | ±% |
|---|---|---|---|---|
| JKNC | Sheikh Mustafa Kamal | 8,555 | 49.25% | New |
| JKPDP | Asiya Naqash | 7,003 | 40.31% | ▲12.93 |
| Independent | Mufti Nazimudin | 1,467 | 8.44% | New |
| Independent | Abul Ahad Mir | 180 | 1.04% | New |
| JKNPP | Mohammed Yaqub Dhunoo | 167 | 0.96% | New |
| Margin of victory | | 1,552 | 8.93% | ▼8.35 |
| Turnout | | 17,372 | 19.89% | ▼9.02 |
| Registered electors | | 87,326 | | ▲2.12 |
| JKNC gain from JKNC | | Swing | ▲4.59 | |

=== Assembly Election 2008 ===
2008 Jammu and Kashmir Legislative Assembly election: Hazratbal
| Party | Candidate | Votes | % | ±% |
|---|---|---|---|---|
| JKNC | Farooq Abdullah | 11,041 | 44.66% | ▼5.13 |
| JKPDP | Asiya Naqash | 6,769 | 27.38% | ▲0.56 |
| INC | Aga Syed Mohasin | 2,913 | 11.78% | ▲7.58 |
| JKPDF | Sheikh Abdul Rashid | 977 | 3.95% | New |
| Independent | Mufti Nazimudin | 597 | 2.41% | New |
| Independent | Ali Mohammad Wani | 370 | 1.50% | New |
| Independent | Mehraj Ud Din Budoo | 361 | 1.46% | New |
| Margin of victory | | 4,272 | 17.28% | ▼5.68 |
| Turnout | | 24,722 | 28.91% | ▲21.79 |
| Registered electors | | 85,514 | | ▼0.36 |
| JKNC hold | | Swing | ▼5.13 | |

=== Assembly Election 2002 ===
2002 Jammu and Kashmir Legislative Assembly election: Hazratbal
| Party | Candidate | Votes | % | ±% |
|---|---|---|---|---|
| JKNC | Mohammed Syed Akhoon | 3,042 | 49.79% | ▼15.30 |
| JKPDP | Ghulam Mohi-Ud-Din Akhoon | 1,639 | 26.82% | New |
| Independent | Ghulam Mohammed Shakhsaz | 696 | 11.39% | New |
| LJP | Mohammed Jaffer Hajam | 287 | 4.70% | New |
| INC | Peer Nazir Ahmed | 257 | 4.21% | ▲0.23 |
| Independent | Mohammed Amin Wani | 111 | 1.82% | New |
| Independent | Ghulam Mohi-Ud-Din Denthoo | 78 | 1.28% | New |
| Margin of victory | | 1,403 | 22.96% | ▼17.30 |
| Turnout | | 6,110 | 7.12% | ▼15.32 |
| Registered electors | | 85,827 | | ▲23.99 |
| JKNC hold | | Swing | ▼15.30 | |

=== Assembly Election 1996 ===
1996 Jammu and Kashmir Legislative Assembly election: Hazratbal
| Party | Candidate | Votes | % | ±% |
|---|---|---|---|---|
| JKNC | Mohammed Syed Akhoon | 10,109 | 65.08% | ▲3.67 |
| BSP | Ghulam Mohi-Ud-Din | 3,855 | 24.82% | New |
| INC | Malik Ghulam Mohammed | 618 | 3.98% | New |
| JD | Ghulam Qadir | 482 | 3.10% | New |
| BJP | Gopi Kishen Mujoo | 468 | 3.01% | New |
| Margin of victory | | 6,254 | 40.27% | ▲4.28 |
| Turnout | | 15,532 | 23.60% | ▼52.70 |
| Registered electors | | 69,222 | | ▲66.65 |
| JKNC hold | | Swing | ▲3.67 | |

=== Assembly Election 1987 ===
1987 Jammu and Kashmir Legislative Assembly election: Hazratbal
| Party | Candidate | Votes | % | ±% |
|---|---|---|---|---|
| JKNC | Mohammed Yasin Shah | 19,167 | 61.41% | ▼8.39 |
| Independent | Syed Fayaz Naqashbandi | 7,936 | 25.43% | New |
| Independent | Sofi Ghulam Ahmed | 2,587 | 8.29% | New |
| JKNC | Mohammed Ismail | 1,520 | 4.87% | ▼64.93 |
| Margin of victory | | 11,231 | 35.99% | ▼16.41 |
| Turnout | | 31,210 | 76.98% | ▼3.41 |
| Registered electors | | 41,538 | | ▲21.50 |
| JKNC hold | | Swing | ▼8.39 | |

=== Assembly Election 1983 ===
1983 Jammu and Kashmir Legislative Assembly election: Hazratbal
| Party | Candidate | Votes | % | ±% |
|---|---|---|---|---|
| JKNC | Hissam-Ud-Din Bandey | 18,744 | 69.80% | ▼10.94 |
| Independent | Sofi Ghulam Ahmed | 4,674 | 17.41% | New |
| Independent | Gaffar Mir | 2,219 | 8.26% | New |
| JI | Ghulam Hassan Wani | 776 | 2.89% | New |
| Independent | Mohammed Afsar | 440 | 1.64% | New |
| Margin of victory | | 14,070 | 52.40% | ▼10.53 |
| Turnout | | 26,853 | 81.53% | ▼1.55 |
| Registered electors | | 34,189 | | ▼4.01 |
| JKNC hold | | Swing | ▼10.94 | |

=== Assembly Election 1977 ===
1977 Jammu and Kashmir Legislative Assembly election: Hazratbal
| Party | Candidate | Votes | % | ±% |
|---|---|---|---|---|
| JKNC | Hissam-Ud-Din Bandey | 23,032 | 80.74% | New |
| JP | Mohammed Iliyas | 5,081 | 17.81% | New |
| Independent | Mohammed Yahya Siddiqi | 346 | 1.21% | New |
| Margin of victory | | 17,951 | 62.93% | ▲61.53 |
| Turnout | | 28,527 | 82.59% | ▲20.52 |
| Registered electors | | 35,617 | | ▲1.68 |
| JKNC gain from Independent | | Swing | | |

=== Assembly Election 1972 ===
1972 Jammu and Kashmir Legislative Assembly election: Hazratbal
| Party | Candidate | Votes | % | ±% |
|---|---|---|---|---|
| Independent | Sofi Ghulam Ahmed | 8,069 | 38.67% | New |
| INC | Mohammed Yahya Siddiqi | 7,777 | 37.27% | ▼2.74 |
| Independent | Ghulam Rasool Shah | 2,541 | 12.18% | New |
| Independent | Syed Qasim | 1,291 | 6.19% | New |
| Independent | Hakim Ghulam Hassan | 833 | 3.99% | New |
| Independent | Mubarik Shah | 260 | 1.25% | New |
| Margin of victory | | 292 | 1.40% | ▼13.61 |
| Turnout | | 20,868 | 63.50% | ▲20.08 |
| Registered electors | | 35,029 | | ▲16.21 |
| Independent gain from JKNC | | Swing | ▼16.35 | |

=== Assembly Election 1967 ===
1967 Jammu and Kashmir Legislative Assembly election: Hazratbal
| Party | Candidate | Votes | % | ±% |
|---|---|---|---|---|
| JKNC | Mohammed Yahya Siddiqi | 6,550 | 55.01% | New |
| INC | G. A. Sofi | 4,763 | 40.01% | New |
| Independent | M. Q. Shah | 340 | 2.86% | New |
| Independent | A. R. Kabli | 253 | 2.12% | New |
| Margin of victory | | 1,787 | 15.01% | |
| Turnout | | 11,906 | 41.27% | ▲39.50 |
| Registered electors | | 30,144 | | ▲10.83 |
| JKNC hold | | Swing | | |

=== Assembly Election 1962 ===
1962 Jammu and Kashmir Legislative Assembly election: Hazratbal
| Party | Candidate | Votes | % | ±% |
|---|---|---|---|---|
| JKNC | Mohammed Yahya Sidiqi | Unopposed | | |
| Registered electors | | 27,198 | | |
| JKNC win (new seat) | | | | |

== See also ==
- Hazratbal
- List of constituencies of Jammu and Kashmir Legislative Assembly
