= Second Sayeed ministry =

Jammu and Kashmir, India government (2015–2016)

- Ministry of State of Jammu and Kashmir

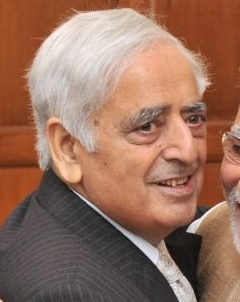
- Mufti Mohammad Sayeed; Hon'ble Chief Minister of Jammu and Kashmir
- Date formed: 1 March 2015
- Date dissolved: 7 January 2016

People and organisations
- Head of state: Governor; N. N. Vohra
- Head of government: Mufti Mohammad Sayeed
- No. of ministers: 24
- Member parties: BJP; Peoples Democratic Party
- Opposition party: JKNC
- Opposition leader: Omar Abdullah (assembly)

History
- Election: 2014
- Outgoing election: 2014
- Legislature term: 5 years
- Predecessor: First Omar Abdullah ministry
- Successor: Mehbooba Mufti ministry

The Mufti Mohammad Sayeed ministry was formed on 1 March 2015, following the elections of Jammu and Kashmir Legislative Assembly in 2014, with Mufti Mohammad Sayeed as Chief Minister. The list of ministers:

== Cabinet ministers ==
Cabinet members
Portfolio	Minister	Took office	Left office	Party
Chief Minister; Other departments not allocated to any Minister	Mufti Mohammad Sayeed	1 March 2015	7 January 2016	JKPDP
Deputy Chief Minister; Power Development and Housing & Urban Development	Nirmal Kumar Singh	1 March 2015	7 January 2016	BJP
Public Works	Abdul Rehman Veeri	1 March 2015	7 January 2016	JKPDP
Finance	Haseeb Drabu	1 March 2015	7 January 2016	JKPDP
Health and Medical Education	Bali Bhagat	1 March 2015	7 January 2016	BJP
Industries and Commerce	Chander Prakash Ganga	1 March 2015	7 January 2016	BJP

== Ministers of state ==
Cabinet members
Portfolio	Minister	Took office	Left office	Party
Housing & Urban Development, Social Welfare, Health & Medical Education	Asiya Naqash	1 March 2015	7 January 2016	JKPDP
Haj & Auqaf (Independent charge), PHE and Irrigation & Flood Control	Farooq Ahmad Andrabi	1 March 2015	7 January 2016	JKPDP

== See also ==
- First Mufti Mohammad Sayeed ministry
- Mehbooba Mufti ministry
