= Altaf Ahmad Wani =

Indian politician (born 1972)

Altaf Kaloo
- Altaf Ahmad Wani
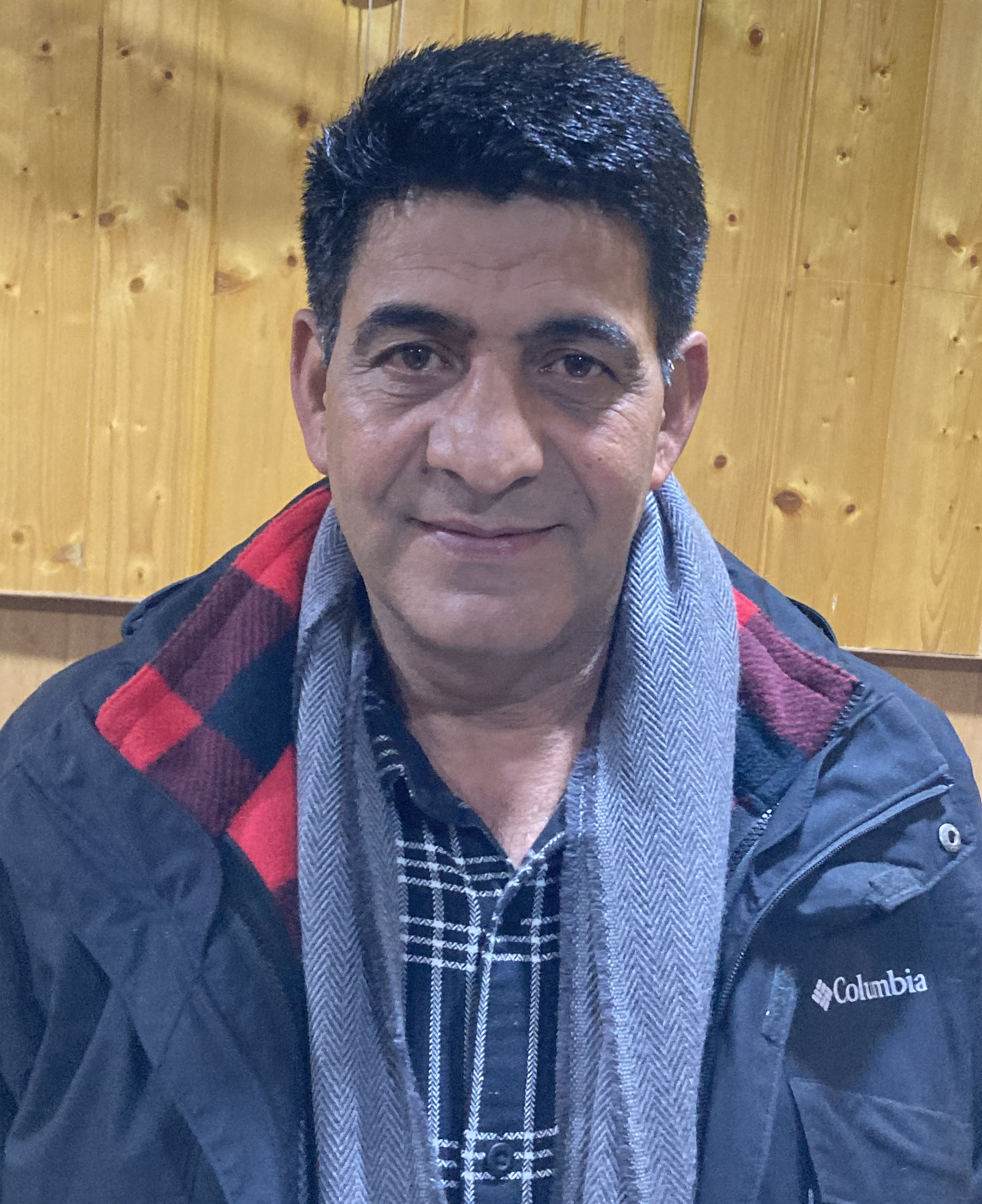

Cabinet Minister, Government of Jammu and Kashmir
- Incumbent
- Assumed office 27 October 2026
- Lieutenant Governor: Manoj Sinha
- Chief Minister: Omar Abdullah
- Ministry and Departments: Forest, Ecology and Environment development; Department of Rural Development and Panchayati Raj
- Preceded by: Javed Ahmad Rana

Member of the Jammu and Kashmir Legislative Assembly
- Incumbent
- Assumed office 8 October 2024
- In office 2014–2018

Member of the Jammu and Kashmir Legislative Council
- In office 2009–2014

Altaf Ahmad Wani, also known as Altaf Kuloo, (born 1972) is an Indian politician who is currently serving as a Cabinet Minister for Forest, Ecology and Environment Department, Department of Rural Development and Panchayati Raj in Govt. of Jammu and Kashmir. He is a member of the Jammu and Kashmir Legislative Assembly representing the constituency of Pahalgam.

He is the only son of Ghulam Rasool Wani, Engineer-turned-politician, was known to people more as a businessman who had an instinct for educational development and started his career by opening a private school in South Kashmir, Delhi Public School, Anantnag. He started political career in 2008 and unsuccessfully contested his first assembly elections on the Jammu & Kashmir National Conference ticket in the same year. He was later nominated as the Member of Legislative Council in 2009.

Born in an upper-middle class business family in Aishmuqam area of Islamabad, he saw a meteoric rise within the JKNC party in rather a short span of time. Top JKNC sources said Kuloo is in the good books of the party top brass and enjoys the kind of patronage, which other party members with a standing of decades in the party don't have. Kuloo was elected to the Jammu and Kashmir Legislative Assembly constituency of Pahalgam in 2014.

In Vidhansabha elections 2014, Altaf Ahmad Wani of Jammu & Kashmir National Conference party won with 25,232 votes.

The runner up was Rafi Ahmad Mir of JKPDP party. The margin of victory was 904 votes.

.In 2024 Assembly elections Altaf Ahmad Wani won the Pahalgam seat by a margin of 13756 votes. Wani has defeated key opponents Rafi Ahmed Mir of Jammu And Kashmir Apni Party; and Shabir Ahmad Sediqui of Jammu & Kashmir Peoples Democratic Party.

== Electoral performance ==
Election	Constituency	Party	Result	Votes %	Opposition Candidate	Opposition Party	Opposition vote %	Ref
2024	Pahalgam	JKNC	Won	52.25%	Rafi Ahmed Mir	JKAP	24.83%	
2014	Pahalgam	JKNC	Won	44.67%	Rafi Ahmad Mir	JKPDP	43.07%	
2008	Pahalgam	JKNC	Lost	27.15%	Rafi Ahmad Mir	JKPDP	49.29%	
