= Shamim Firdous =

Indian politician (born 1966)

Cabinet Minister, Government of Jammu and Kashmir
- Incumbent
- Assumed office 27 October 2026
- Lieutenant Governor: Manoj Sinha
- Chief Minister: Omar Abdullah
- Ministry and Departments: School Education Department, Higher Education Department; Jal Shakti Department

Shamima Firdous (born 1966) is an Indian politician from Jammu and Kashmir who is currently serving as Minister of School Education Department, Higher Education Department, Jal Shakti Department in Government of Jammu and Kashmir. She is a three-time MLA from Habba Kadal Assembly constituency in Srinagar district. She won the 2014 Jammu and Kashmir Legislative Assembly election representing the Jammu and Kashmir National Conference party. She won for the third time in the 2024 Assembly election.

== Early life and education ==
Firdous is from Habba kadal Assembly constituency, Srinagar district. She married Mohammad Anees. She completed her B.A. and L.L.B. honors at Kashmir University in 1983.

== Career ==
Firdous won the Habba Kadal Assembly constituency representing the Jammu and Kashmir National Conference in the 2014 Jammu and Kashmir Legislative Assembly election. She polled 4,955 votes and defeated her nearest rival, Moti Koul of the Bharatiya Janata Party, by a margin of 2,359 votes. She is one of the three-woman MLAs elected in the 2014 Assembly election. She became an MLA for the first time winning the 2008 Jammu and Kashmir Legislative Assembly election on the JKNC seat. She retained the Habba Kadal seat winning the 2014 Jammu and Kashmir Legislative Assembly election and won the 2024 Assembly election defeating Ashok Kumar Bhat of the Bharatiya Janata Party, by a margin of 9,538 votes.

== Electoral performance ==
Election	Constituency	Party	Result	Votes %	Opposition Candidate	Opposition Party	Opposition vote %	Ref
2024	Habba Kadal	JKNC	Won	64.68%	Ashok Kumar Bhat	BJP	15.08%	
2014	Habba Kadal	JKNC	Won	42.40%	Moti Koul	BJP	22.21%	
2008	Habba Kadal	JKNC	Won	41.14%	Hira Lal Chatta	BJP	11.65%	
