= Inderwal Assembly constituency =

Constituency of the Jammu and Kashmir Legislative Assembly

Coordinates: 33.44°N 75.59°E

Inderwal
- Constituency No. 48 for the Jammu and Kashmir Legislative Assembly

Constituency details
- Country: India
- State: Jammu and Kashmir
- District: Kishtwar
- Lok Sabha constituency: Udhampur
- Established: 1967

Member of Legislative Assembly
- Incumbent Payare Lal Sharma
- Party: Independent
- Elected year: 2024

Inderwal Assembly constituency is one of the 90 constituencies in the Jammu and Kashmir Legislative Assembly of Jammu and Kashmir a north state of India. Inderwal is also part of Udhampur Lok Sabha constituency.

== Members of the Legislative Assembly ==
Election	Member	Party
1967	Khan Abdul Gani Goni	Indian National Congress
1972	Khan Abdul Gani Goni	Jammu & Kashmir National Conference
1977	Sheikh Ghulam Mohamad	Indian National Congress
1983	Sheikh Ghulam Mohamad	Indian National Congress
1987	Shareef Naiz	Jammu & Kashmir National Conference
1996	Qazi Jalal-Ud-Din	Jammu & Kashmir National Conference
2002	Ghulam Mohammad Saroori	Indian National Congress
2008	Ghulam Mohammad Saroori	Indian National Congress
2014	Ghulam Mohammad Saroori	Indian National Congress
2024	Pyare Lal Sharma	Independent politician

== Election results ==
=== Assembly Election 2024 ===
2024 Jammu and Kashmir Legislative Assembly election : Inderwal
Party	Candidate	Votes	%	±%
Independent	Payare Lal Sharma	14,195	26.36	New
Independent	Ghulam Mohammad Saroori	13,552	25.16	New
INC	Mohammed Zafarullah	12,533	23.27	▼23.66
BJP	Taraq Hussain Keen	9,550	17.73	▼9.69
JKPDP	Nasir Hussain Sheikh	1,044	1.94	▼17.89
Independent	Salman Rabbani	723	1.34	New
BSP	Salman Nisar	549	1.02	New
NOTA	None of the Above	1,145	2.13	▲1.44
Margin of victory		643	1.19	▼18.32
Turnout		53,855	84.02	▲8.38
Registered electors		64,101		▼23.52
Independent gain from INC		Swing	▼20.58	

=== Assembly Election 2014 ===
2014 Jammu and Kashmir Legislative Assembly election : Inderwal
Party	Candidate	Votes	%	±%
INC	Ghulam Mohammad Saroori	29,754	46.93	▲4.26
BJP	Tariq Hussain Keen	17,384	27.42	▲4.34
JKPDP	Abdul Majeed Batt	12,570	19.83	▲18.53
RKSP	Tanveer Hussain	881	1.39	New
Independent	Shanawaz Ahmed	559	0.88	New
Independent	Abdul Majeed Ganai	547	0.86	New
NOTA	None of the Above	435	0.69	New
Margin of victory		12,370	19.51	▼0.08
Turnout		63,396	75.64	▲2.83
Registered electors		83,813		▲14.79
INC hold		Swing	▲4.26	

=== Assembly Election 2008 ===
2008 Jammu and Kashmir Legislative Assembly election : Inderwal
Party	Candidate	Votes	%	±%
INC	Ghulam Mohammad Saroori	22,684	42.67	▼22.08
BJP	Shakti Raj	12,269	23.08	▲9.17
JKNC	Abdul Karim	9,002	16.93	▲1.99
Independent	Javed Ahmad Zargar	4,100	7.71	New
Independent	Ghulam Mohammed Kohli	991	1.86	New
JKPDP	Abdul Rehman Wani	688	1.29	▲0.43
Independent	Mansoor Ahmed Mattoo	648	1.22	New
Margin of victory		10,415	19.59	▼30.21
Turnout		53,157	72.81	▲16.21
Registered electors		73,012		▲8.99
INC hold		Swing	▼22.08	

=== Assembly Election 2002 ===
2002 Jammu and Kashmir Legislative Assembly election : Inderwal
Party	Candidate	Votes	%	±%
INC	Ghulam Mohammad Saroori	24,551	64.75	New
JKNC	Jalal-Ud-Din	5,667	14.95	▼22.92
BJP	Salam Din	5,273	13.91	▼7.77
BSP	Kewel Singh	835	2.20	New
Independent	Mohan Lal Bhandari	553	1.46	New
Independent	Tariq Hussain	379	1.00	New
JKPDP	Bashir Ahmed Bhat	326	0.86	New
Margin of victory		18,884	49.80	▲46.07
Turnout		37,917	56.61	▼3.12
Registered electors		66,991		▲36.53
INC gain from JKNC		Swing	▲26.88	

=== Assembly Election 1996 ===
1996 Jammu and Kashmir Legislative Assembly election : Inderwal
Party	Candidate	Votes	%	±%
JKNC	Qazi Jalal-Ud-Din	11,097	37.87	New
Independent	Ghulam Mohammad Saroori	10,002	34.13	New
BJP	Balwant Singh	6,351	21.67	▲18.66
JD	Sadder Din	1,194	4.07	New
Independent	Mohan Lal Bhandri	348	1.19	New
Independent	Nazir Ahmad	312	1.06	New
Margin of victory		1,095	3.74	▼83.54
Turnout		29,304	61.27	▼5.21
Registered electors		49,066		▲6.85
JKNC gain from INC		Swing	▼52.91	

=== Assembly Election 1987 ===
1987 Jammu and Kashmir Legislative Assembly election : Inderwal
Party	Candidate	Votes	%	±%
INC	Shareef Naiz	27,069	90.78	▲57.23
Independent	Sheikh Ghulam Mohammed	1,045	3.50	New
BJP	Jai Lal Shah	899	3.01	New
LKD	Dadri Nath	472	1.58	New
Independent	Ram Lal Rao	189	0.63	New
Margin of victory		26,024	87.28	▲77.91
Turnout		29,818	65.50	▲3.45
Registered electors		45,921		▲16.88
INC gain from JKNC		Swing	▲47.86	

=== Assembly Election 1983 ===
1983 Jammu and Kashmir Legislative Assembly election : Inderwal
Party	Candidate	Votes	%	±%
JKNC	Sheikh Ghulam Mohammed	10,367	42.92	▼1.46
INC	Mohammad Sharief Niaz	8,104	33.55	▲25.51
Independent	Noor Mohammed .	2,454	10.16	New
Independent	Peer Nizam-Ud-Din	1,697	7.03	New
JI	Abdul Rashid	512	2.12	New
Independent	Lakhmi Chand	496	2.05	New
Independent	Jagdish Raj	226	0.94	New
Margin of victory		2,263	9.37	▼13.81
Turnout		24,155	63.28	▲25.45
Registered electors		39,290		▲18.61
JKNC hold		Swing	▼1.46	

=== Assembly Election 1977 ===
1977 Jammu and Kashmir Legislative Assembly election : Inderwal
Party	Candidate	Votes	%	±%
JKNC	Sheikh Ghulam Mohammed	5,296	44.38	New
JP	Abdul Ghani Goni	2,530	21.20	New
Independent	Ghulam Hussain	1,373	11.50	New
INC	Azad Gaulam Nabi	959	8.04	▼72.26
Independent	Ram Lal	461	3.86	New
Independent	Ghulam Nabi	283	2.37	New
Independent	Syed Hussain Shah	256	2.15	New
Margin of victory		2,766	23.18	▼45.45
Turnout		11,934	37.10	▼7.08
Registered electors		33,124		▲17.93
JKNC gain from INC		Swing	▼35.91	

=== Assembly Election 1972 ===
1972 Jammu and Kashmir Legislative Assembly election : Inderwal
Party	Candidate	Votes	%	±%
INC	Khan Abdul Gani Goni	9,721	80.29	▲24.25
JI	Abdul Rashid	1,412	11.66	New
ABJS	Badri Nath	974	8.04	▼5.66
Margin of victory		8,309	68.63	▲42.84
Turnout		12,107	43.73	▲2.09
Registered electors		28,088		▲7.74
INC hold		Swing		

=== Assembly Election 1967 ===
1967 Jammu and Kashmir Legislative Assembly election : Inderwal
Party	Candidate	Votes	%	±%
INC	Khan Abdul Gani Goni	5,993	56.05	New
JKNC	L. Mallik	3,235	30.25	New
ABJS	S. Raj	1,465	13.70	New
Margin of victory		2,758	25.79	
Turnout		10,693	43.99	
Registered electors		26,069		
INC win (new seat)				

== See also ==
- Kishtwar
- List of constituencies of Jammu and Kashmir Legislative Assembly
