= Naeem Akhtar (politician) =

Indian politician

Syed Naeem Akhtar Andrabi

Member of Jammu and Kashmir Legislative Council
- In office 7 March 2013 – August 2019 (council dissolved)

Personal details
- Born: 15 March 1952 (age 74) Bandipora, Kashmir
- Party: Jammu and Kashmir People's Democratic Party
- Education: University of Kashmir (BSc)
- Occupation: Politician
- Profession: Civil servant
- Portfolio: Ministry of Public works

Syed Naeem Akhtar Andrabi is an Indian politician from the state of Jammu and Kashmir. He was a member of Jammu and Kashmir Legislative Council as a candidate of the Jammu and Kashmir People's Democratic Party. He was also the minister of public works in the Mehbooba Mufti government.

== Political career ==
In 2010, during the 2010 Kashmir unrest, Akhtar, the then spokesman of the party used to criticise the National Conference party and chief minister Omar Abdullah.

Akhtar was elected to the Legislative Council on 7 March 2013 as a Jammu and Kashmir People's Democratic Party candidate. In 2015, Akhtar was made the Education Minister in the Mufti Mohammad Sayeed government.

In September 2015, Akhtar installed a helpline number to his personal office to hear complaints from the stakeholders, namely parents, teachers and students concerned. He has also advocated for the separation of politics and education.

In February 2017, in a cabinet reshuffle, chief minister Mehbooba Mufti gave Akhtar the portfolio of "Public Works Department", with Altaf Bukhari getting his portfolio.

== Views ==
=== Goods and services tax ===
About the Goods and Services Tax, Akhtar said that the government would introduce a bill in the assembly for its implementation. He has said that goods would be cheaper due to the GST as it would bring an end to the system of double taxation.

== Personal life ==
Akhtar was a critic of the 2016 Kashmir unrest. He was threatened by militant group Lashkar-e-Taiba as he reopened schools which were closed during the unrest.

In August 2016, Akhtar's Srinagar residence was attacked as a petrol bomb was thrown towards it.

Abid Ansari, a legislator from his party, has blamed Akhtar for "spoiling the party" and has accused him of working under external agency.
