= Priya Sethi =

Indian politician

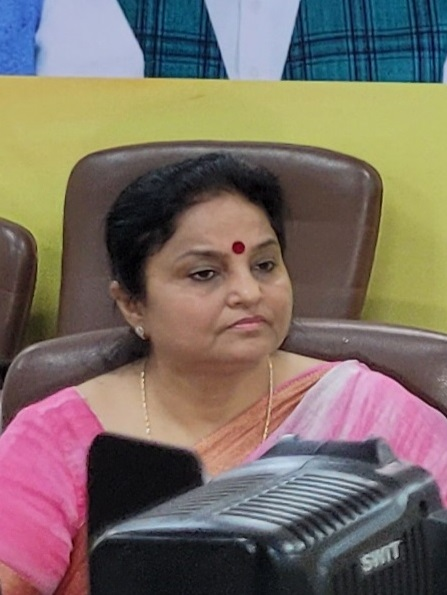
- Priya Sethi at a press conference at BJP Office, Jammu.

Minister of State, Government of Jammu and Kashmir
- In office 2014 – 30 April 2018

Member of the Jammu and Kashmir Legislative Assembly
- In office 2014–2018
- Constituency: Nominated

Personal details
- Political party: Bharatiya Janata Party

Priya Sethi is a leader of Bharatiya Janata Party and a minister of state in the Government of Jammu and Kashmir. She was president of Jammu and Kashmir BJP Mahila Morcha.
