= Salman Sagar =

Indian politician

Member of Jammu and Kashmir Legislative Assembly
- Incumbent
- Assumed office 8 October 2024
- Preceded by: Asiya Naqash
- Constituency: Hazratbal

Personal details
- Political party: Jammu & Kashmir National Conference
- Parent: Ali Mohammad Sagar
- Profession: Politician

Salman Ali Sagar is an Indian politician from Jammu & Kashmir and is the son of Ali Mohammad Sagar. He is a member of the Jammu and Kashmir Legislative Assembly since the 2024 election, representing Hazratbal Assembly constituency as a Member of the Jammu & Kashmir National Conference party and Provincial President (Kashmir) of Jammu and Kashmir Youth National Conference. He is a former mayor of Srinagar (Srinagar Municipal Corporation).

== See also ==
- 2024 Jammu & Kashmir Legislative Assembly election
- Jammu and Kashmir Legislative Assembly
