= Jammu and Kashmir Infrastructure Development Finance Corporation =

- Abbreviation: JKIDFC
- Formation: 2018; 8 years ago
- Type: Registered corporation under the Companies Act
- Headquarters: Jammu and Kashmir, India
- Chairperson: Arun Kumar Mehta(IAS)
- Website: https://www.jkidfc.in/

Jammu and Kashmir Infrastructure Development Finance Corporation (JKIDFC) Limited was formed in 2018 to speed-up pending, unfunded or languishing infrastructure development projects in Jammu and Kashmir. JKIDFC is a registered corporation under the Companies Act that is mandated to raise funds up to ₹8,000 crore (equivalent to ₹94 billion or US$1.1 billion in 2023), which are guaranteed by the state government, for funding infrastructure development in Jammu and Kashmir. Some of the projects which JKIDFC is undertaking have been pending for 25 years old.

On 9 August 2020, it was announced the that "over 600 projects of immense public importance", projects which had been left languishing for up to 25 years, had been completed. These projects include extension/construction/widening of roads, bridges, water supply schemes and flats. Other major projects included development of industrial estates, healthcare infrastructure, entrepreneurship development institutes, sports infrastructure, education infrastructure and hand pumps across the region. In financial year 2019–20, over 1200 projects worth ₹2,280 crore (equivalent to ₹27 billion or US$320 million in 2023) were financed under JKIDFC.
