= Nirmal Kumar Singh =

Indian politician (born 1956)

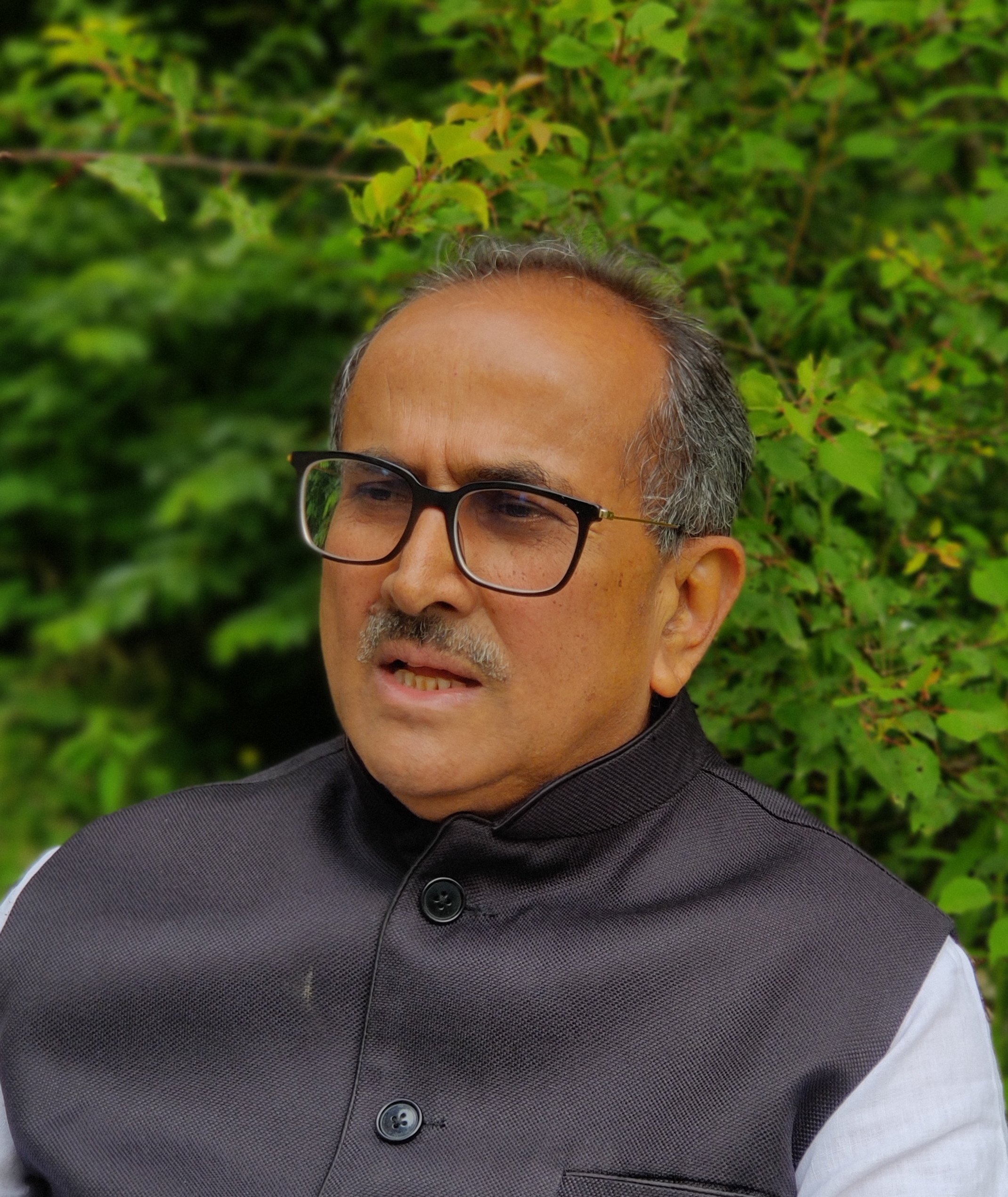
- Singh in June 2021

Speaker of the Jammu and Kashmir Legislative Assembly
- In office 10 May 2018 – 31 October 2019
- Chief Minister: Mehbooba Mufti
- Preceded by: Kavinder Gupta
- Succeeded by: Abdul Rahim Rather (UT)

Deputy Chief Minister of Jammu and Kashmirstate
- In office 4 April 2016 – 29 April 2018
- Governor: Narinder Nath Vohra
- Chief Minister: Mehbooba Mufti
- Succeeded by: Kavinder Gupta
- In office 1 March 2015 – 6 January 2016
- Governor: Narinder Nath Vohra
- Chief Minister: Mufti Muhammad Sayeed
- Preceded by: Tara Chand

Minister of Power Development, Jammu and Kashmir
- In office 1 March 2015 – 29 April 2018
- Governor: Narinder Nath Vohra
- Chief Minister: Mufti Muhammad Sayeed; Mehbooba Mufti
- Preceded by: Omar Abdullah
- Succeeded by: Sunil Sharma

Minister of Housing and Urban Development, Jammu and Kashmir
- In office 1 March 2015 – 29 April 2018
- Governor: Narinder Nath Vohra
- Chief Minister: Mufti Muhammad Sayeed; Mehbooba Mufti
- Preceded by: Nawang Rigzin Jora
- Succeeded by: Sat Paul Sharma

Minister of Industries & Commerce, Jammu and Kashmir
- In office 17 April 2018 – 29 April 2018
- Governor: Narinder Nath Vohra
- Chief Minister: Mehbooba Mufti
- Preceded by: Chander Prakash Ganga
- Succeeded by: Kavinder Gupta

Minister of Forest, Ecology & Environment, Jammu and Kashmir
- In office 17 April 2018 – 29 April 2018
- Governor: Narinder Nath Vohra
- Chief Minister: Mehbooba Mufti
- Preceded by: Lal Singh
- Succeeded by: Rajiv Jasrotia

Member of Jammu and Kashmir Legislative Assembly
- In office 23 December 2014 – 21 November 2018
- Preceded by: Manohar Lal Sharma
- Succeeded by: Satish Kumar Sharma
- Constituency: Billawar

Personal details
- Born: 22 January 1956 (age 70) Karanwara, Jammu and Kashmir, India
- Party: Bharatiya Janata Party
- Spouse: Mamta Singh
- Children: 2
- Education: University of Jammu
- Occupation: Politician, Academic

Nirmal Kumar Singh is an Indian politician who served as the last Speaker of the Jammu and Kashmir Legislative Assembly of the erstwhile Jammu and Kashmir State. He is also a former Deputy Chief Minister of Jammu and Kashmir. He is a leader of Bharatiya Janata Party.

He was elected to the Jammu and Kashmir Legislative Assembly in the 2014 assembly election from Billawar in Kathua district. On 1 March 2015, he assumed the charge of the Deputy Chief Minister of Jammu and Kashmir along with Minister incharge for Power Development and Housing and Urban Development.

== Early life, education and academic profession ==
Nirmal Singh was born on 22 January 1956 to a humble family in Karanwara Basohli, Jammu and Kashmir. He did his primary education in his native place. He is the youngest of his two brothers. His father was a security aide of the erstwhile Maharaja Hari Singh of Jammu and Kashmir (princely state). Singh has done PhD in history from University of Jammu in 1988 and retired as a professor in the Department of History, the University of Jammu in 2017. After being elected to J&K Legislative Assembly in 2014 and becoming Deputy Chief Minister of the erstwhile State, Singh acted as a guide for two of his students who were preparing for PhD thesis submission. Despite being busy with his new assignment as DyCM, Singh ensured he is present at the university to watch the submission. Singh authored a book titled 'Inter Communal Relations in Jammu and Kashmir from 1846-1931', a deep insight into the crucial phase of history of Jammu and Kashmir. He has guided at least four PhD and five M Phil scholars.

== Political career ==
Singh started taking an active interest in political activities at a young age. He was arrested during the Emergency period in 1975. After serving the ABVP as a pracharak in different parts of the country, Dr Singh returned to Jammu and joined the University of Jammu as a lecturer in the Post Graduate Department of History. Besides teaching at the department, he also took the mantle of the J&K State President, Akhil Bharatiya Vidyarthi Parishad and following a directive from the RSS joined the BJP. He was appointed the State General Secretary of the party in 1998.

Singh contested several Lok Sabha and state assembly elections. His first election was 2002 Lok Sabha By-Election from Jammu (Lok Sabha constituency), he came second with 1,98,277 votes and Chowdhary Talib Hussein of Jammu & Kashmir National Conference was declared victorious under allegations of heavy rigging.

Singh was among the first politicians from Jammu to demand the Reorganisation of the State of Jammu and Kashmir on a regional basis amid heavy discrimination with Jammu and Ladakh regions by Kashmir centric state governments. While he was the State President of Bharatiya Janata Party he released a booklet containing figures to show how Jammu was discriminated against by the state government. In that booklet, he pointed out that out of 2.5 lakh total State Government employees only one lakh were from the Jammu region in 2004. The State Secretariat had over 85 per cent of employees belonging to Kashmir, while their strength was about 15 per cent from Jammu. The booklet indicated that the investment in the irrigation projects in Kashmir was Rs 38.98 crore against Rs 14.15 crore in Jammu where the geographical area was 26,293 km^{2} (10,152 sq mi) against 15,953 km^{2} (6,159 sq mi) in the Kashmir valley. The Booklet also pointed out that Jammu was denied its due share of seats in the Assembly with only 37 seats to the region against 46 of Kashmir. More importantly, in 2004, the average number of voters per Assembly Constituency in the Kashmir region was 55,367 while in Jammu was 78,170 and an average number of voters per Lok Sabha Constituency in Kashmir region was 8,48,971 while in Jammu was 14,46,145. Jammu has 2 Lok Sabha Constituencies and Kashmir has 3.

Singh contested his second election again from Jammu (Lok Sabha constituency) during 2004 Indian general election. This time he lost with a margin of 17,558 votes against Congressman Madan Lal Sharma.

In 2008, Singh contested from Gandhinagar Assembly Constituency against Raman Bhalla of Indian National Congress. He lost the election by 2263 votes.

During 2009 Indian general election Singh contested from Udhampur (Lok Sabha constituency) against Chaudhary Lal Singh of Congress. Lal singh won the election with a margin of 13,394 votes.

Singh won his first election during 2014 Jammu and Kashmir Legislative Assembly election from Billawar constituency in Kathua district by defeating sitting Congress MLA by a margin of nearly 17,975 votes. He scored 43,447 votes while his closest rival Manohar Lal Sharma of Congress could get only 25,472 votes. BJP got 25 seats and formed the Government with Peoples Democratic Party with Mufti Mohammad Sayeed as the Chief Minister of Jammu and Kashmir. On 1 March 2015, the newly elected ministers took oath to their respective offices. Singh became the first BJP Deputy Chief Minister and took charge of Minister of Power Development as well as the Minister of Housing & Urban Development in the Cabinet on the same day. Singh was among the top names considered for the post of Chief Minister of Jammu and Kashmir, if BJP had got the upper hand in the negotiations to form the Government with PDP.

On 7 January 2016, Chief Minister Mufti Sayeed died in AIIMS New Delhi after multiple organ failures. On 4 April 2016, Mehbooba Mufti took the oath of the Chief Minister and Singh was sworn in for the second term as Deputy Chief Minister in a simple function held at Raj Bhavan in winter capital Jammu. The coalition was saved after 3 months of wrangling between Ms Mufti and BJP, over the future of their coalition government.

As Minister of Power, Singh worked for strengthening the power distribution and power generation in Jammu and Kashmir. He pushed various power projects in the State costing ₹4,153 crore, especially Pakal Dul Power Project with capacity of 1000 MW. An amount of ₹1,263.9 crore was earmarked to ensure the augmentation of State's transmission system. While answering a question in State Assembly on 28 January 2017, Singh said under PMDP an amount of ₹220 crore has been earmarked for improving power infrastructure at tourist destinations, ₹1,039 crore for augmentation of distribution infrastructure, ₹116 crore for improving distribution network for four industrial estates, ₹900 crore for capital cities and an amount of ₹105 crore for small grids and smart metering. Singh pushed the officers of J&K Power Development Department (PDD) to meet the targets set for completion of various center-funded schemes. In a meeting, convened on 17 March 2018, to review the progress of various schemes, Dr Singh suspended the Superintending Engineer and Executive Engineer of PDD, Kishtwar district with immediate effect for not meeting the set targets. MoS Power Asiya Naqash, Com Secretary Power Hridesh Kumar, MD J&K State Development Power Corporation Shah Faesal, Secretary Technical Power and Chief Engineers, representative of project monitoring and implementing agencies and senior officers of the department were present in the meeting. On 28 March 2018, Singh launched the initiative of providing electricity to 53 un-electrified villages of Kishtwar, Kupwara, Bandipora, Leh and Kargil in the Off Grid Mode from Kishtwar. The initiative was implemented by J&K State Power Development Corporation Limited (JKSPDC) in collaboration with IIT Madras. Indian Air Force air lifted the Solar panels from Chandigarh to the remote areas on the request of State Government. Singh also worked for the 100% electrification of Jammu and Kashmir under many schemes including center-funded 'Power for All' scheme. He stressed on the Prime Minister’s vision of providing 24×7 electricity to every household of J&K and implementation in transparent and efficient manner. On 11 December 2017, he launched Saubhagya (Sahaj Bijli Har Ghar Yojna) in J&K with motive of providing free electricity connections to the poor of the erstwhile State.

On 17 April 2018, Singh was given the additional charge of the Departments of Industries & Commerce and Forest, Ecology & Environment by the Chief Minister after former ministers Chander Prakash Ganga and Chaudhary Lal Singh resigned.

On 29 April 2018, Singh resigned as the Deputy Chief Minister as a part of a cabinet reshuffle. On 10 May 2018, Singh was elected as Speaker of Legislative Assembly, defeating Usman Majid, Congress MLA from Bandipora. The motion to elect Dr Singh was moved by Law, Justice and Parliamentary Affairs Minister Syed Basharat Ahmed Bukhari and seconded by then Deputy Chief Minister Kavinder Gupta.

On 21 November 2018, Governor Satya Pal Malik dissolved the J&K Legislative Assembly but Dr Singh continued to hold the chair of the Speaker. On 16 November 2019, Department of Law, Justice and Parliamentary Affairs, J&K Government issued a notification No. LD(PAB)2019/12, stating that Dr Nirmal Singh ceased to hold the office of Speaker of the erstwhile State of J&K with effect from 31 October 2019.

The All-Party meeting was called upon and chaired by the Prime Minister Narendra Modi on 24 June 2021 at New Delhi. Singh was invited to the meeting along with senior politicians from Jammu and Kashmir.

After the killing of Rahul Bhat, a clerk under the special employment package for Kashmiri migrants by terrorists in Budgam district on 12 May 2022, in an interview with The Indian Express, Dr Singh stressed that apart from the government’s protective measures for the migrant community, the permanent return of Kashmiri migrants to their homes in the Valley will be possible only when the local majority community also comes out in their support. In October 2022, a committee of Senior BJP Leaders from J&K was constituted to look into the issues related to PM package employees, reserved category employees and minorities living in Kashmir Valley. Singh headed the committee which also included former MLC Ajay Bharti, BJP senior leader, H L Bhat and Kashmir Displaced District president, Chand Ji Bhat. The committee visited Aalwpura Migrant Colony in Shopian district along with Relief and Rehabilitation Commissioner, K K Sidha. The committee also visited Vessu migrant colony in Kulgam district and Hawal migrant camp in Pulwama district. The committee held meetings with Divisional Commissioner, Kashmir, P K Pole, District Development Commissioner, Shopian and SSP Shopian to take the stock of the situation. A deputation of Kashmiri migrant employees met Singh on 3 April 2023, he was listening to the public grievances at BJP headquarters, Trikuta Nagar, Jammu. He stated that BJP is committed for accelerating construction of transit accommodations for the Kashmiri migrant employees. Dr Singh is available every Monday at the BJP Office, Trikuta Nagar, Jammu for grievance redressal of general public.

Singh was nominated as the Chairperson of Election Campaign Committee during 2024 Jammu and Kashmir Legislative Assembly election by BJP National President J P Nadda keeping in view his substantial influence.

In the aftermath of 2025 floods, Singh toured the flood affected areas of Jammu division along with the local MLA Mohal Lal and officials. He assured the people that the BJP stands firmly with the people of Jammu and Kashmir during such natural disasters. He also said that the party is assessing flood damage across the Union Territory and will present a comprehensive report to the central leadership seeking a special relief package. He urged the UT administration to immediately release restoration funds to bring public life back to normalcy.

== Gallery ==
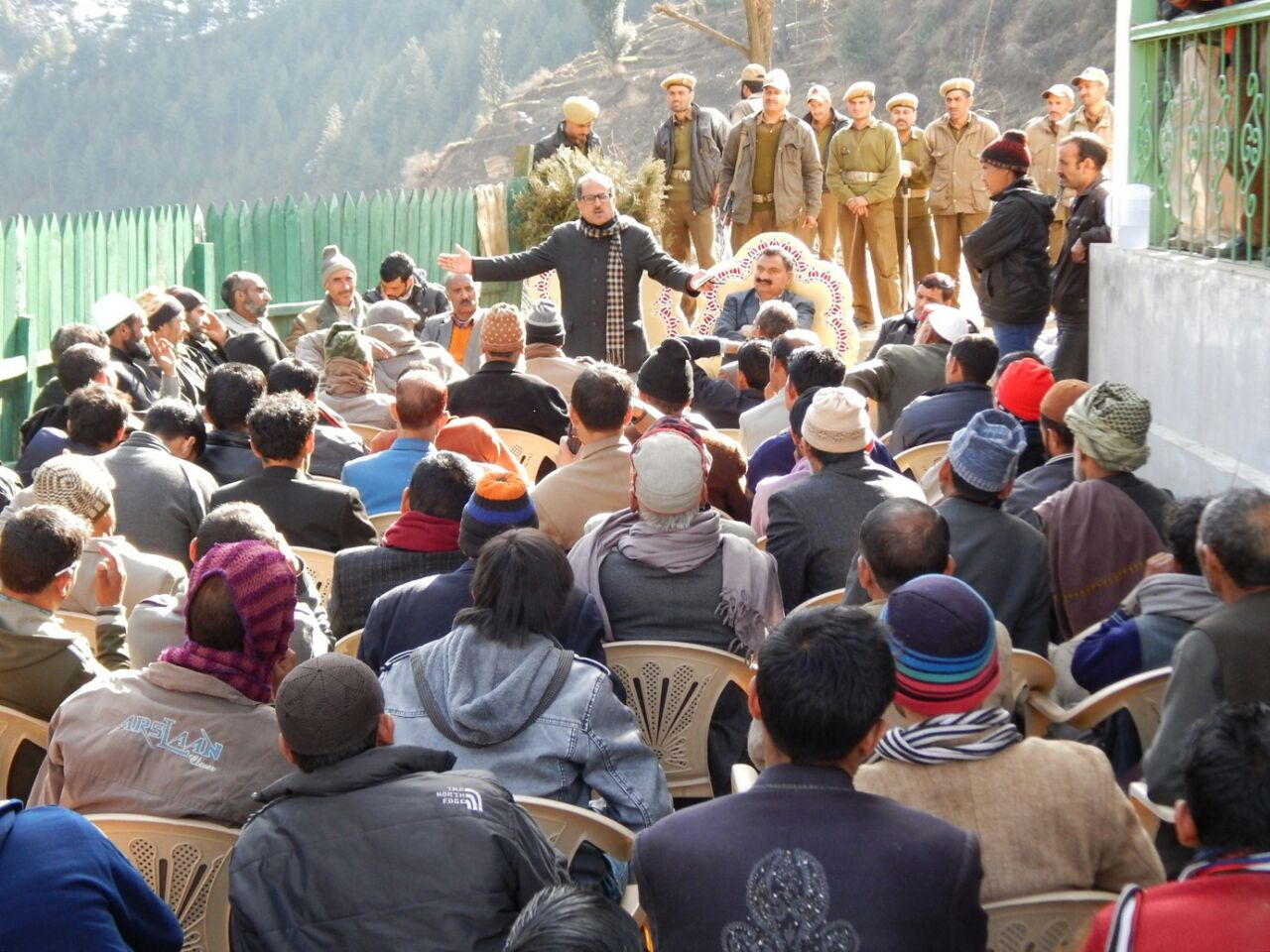
Dr Nirmal Singh addressing people of Bhalessa Gandoh, Bhadrawah

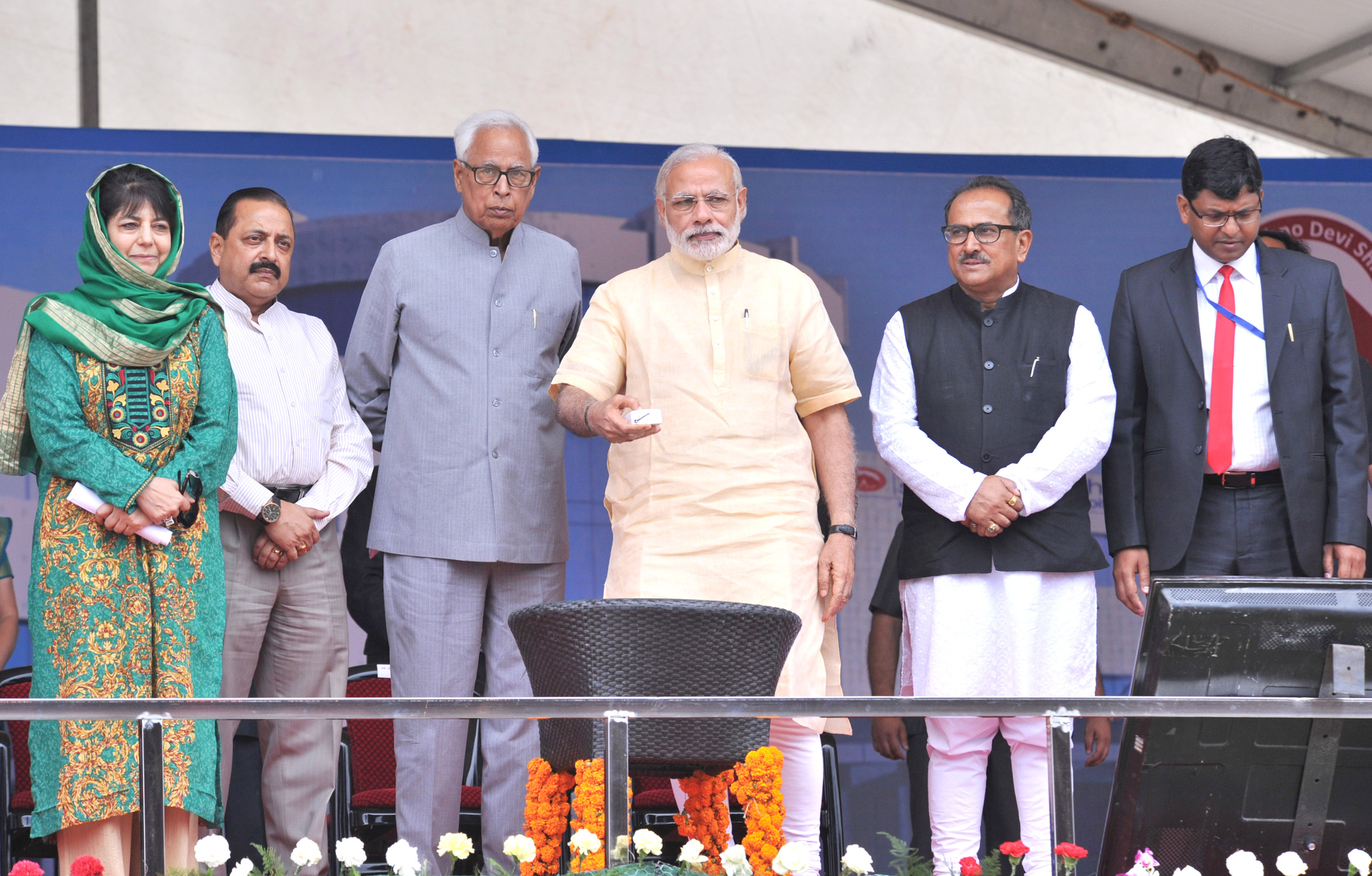
Prime Minister Shri Narendra Modi inaugurates Sports Complex in Katra, Jammu and Kashmir.

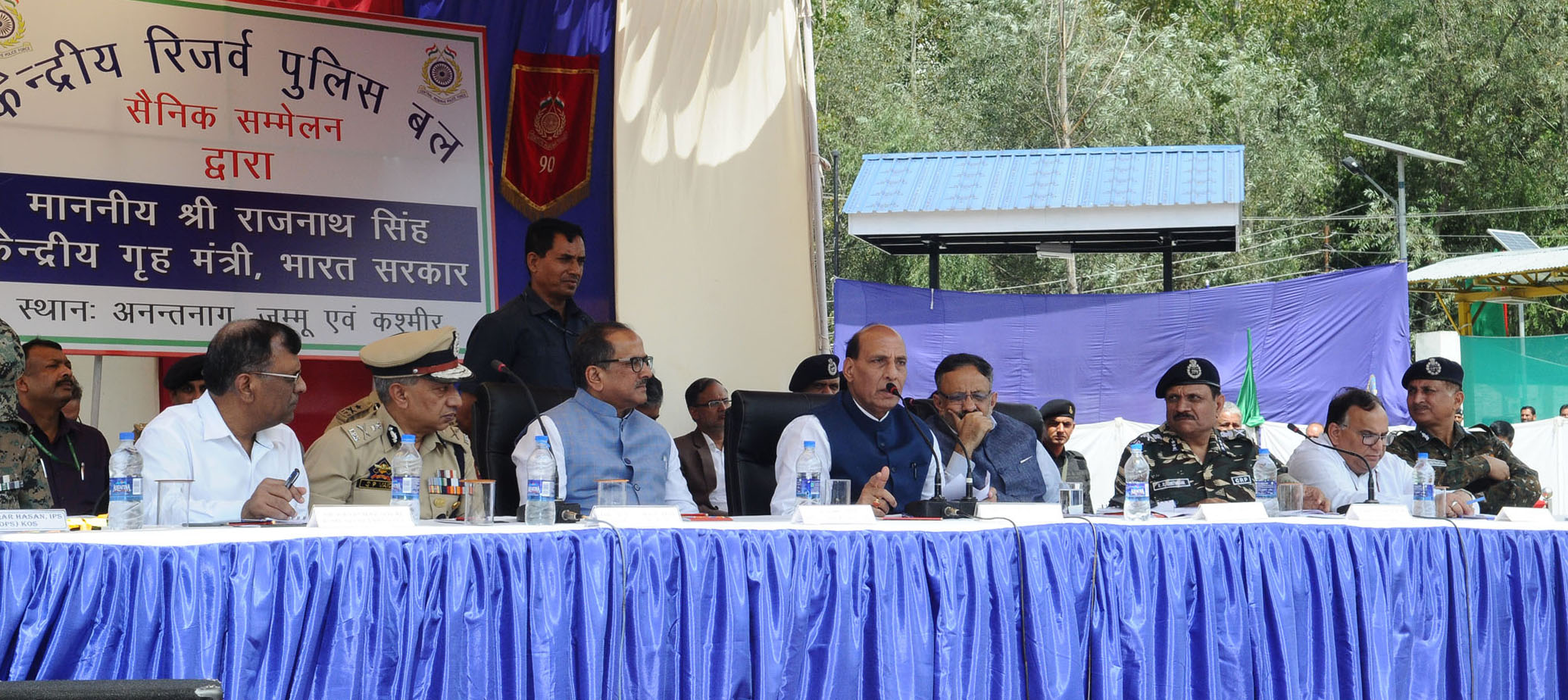
The Union Home Minister, Shri Rajnath Singh addressing the Sainik Sammelan, during his visit to the CRPF Camp, in Anantnag district. Dr Nirmal Singh and S P Vaid, DGP, J&K Police are also present.

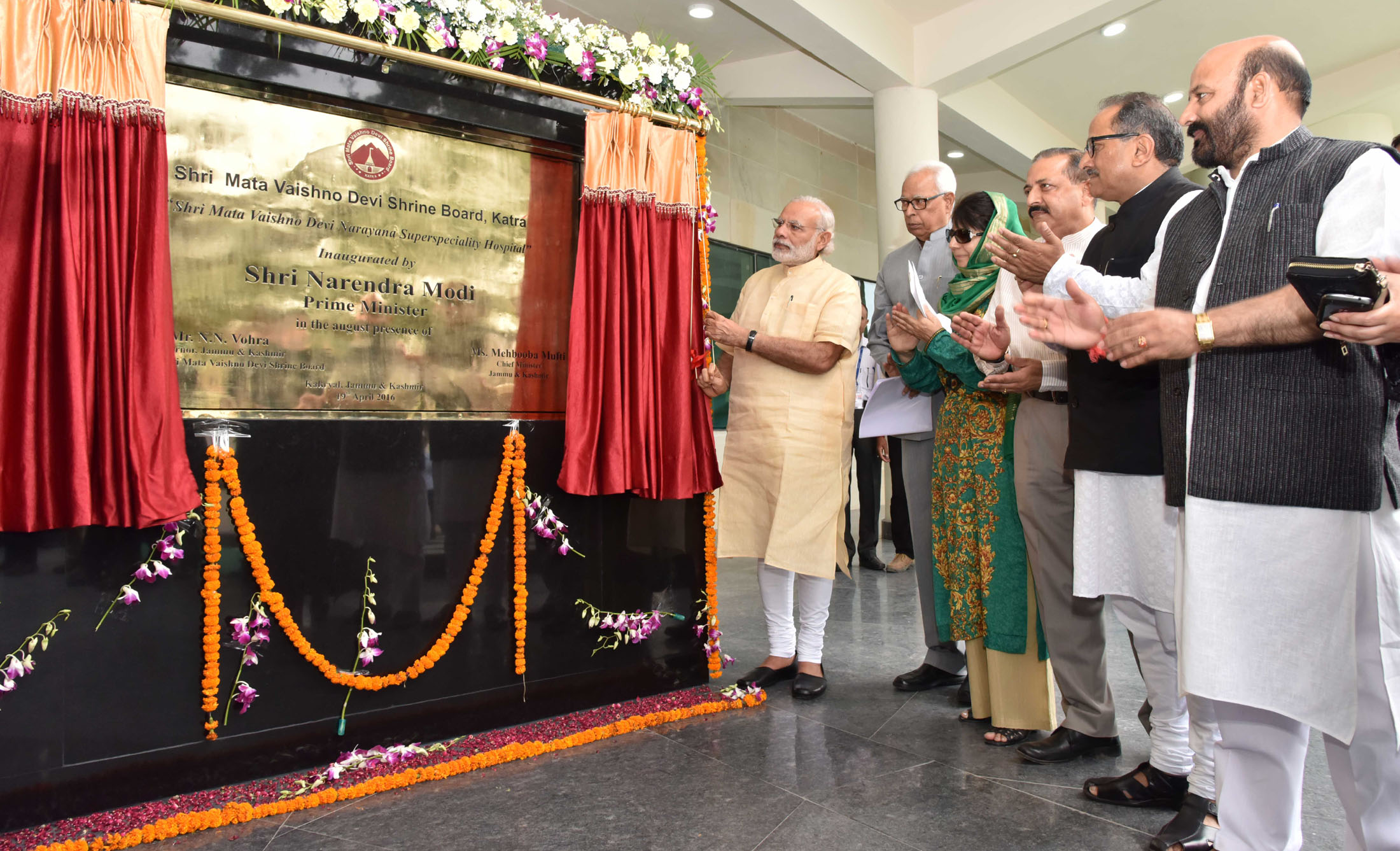
Prime Minister Shri Narendra Modi inaugurates Shri Mata Vaishno Devi Narayana Superspeciality Hospital, Katra. Dr Nirmal Singh is second from the right.

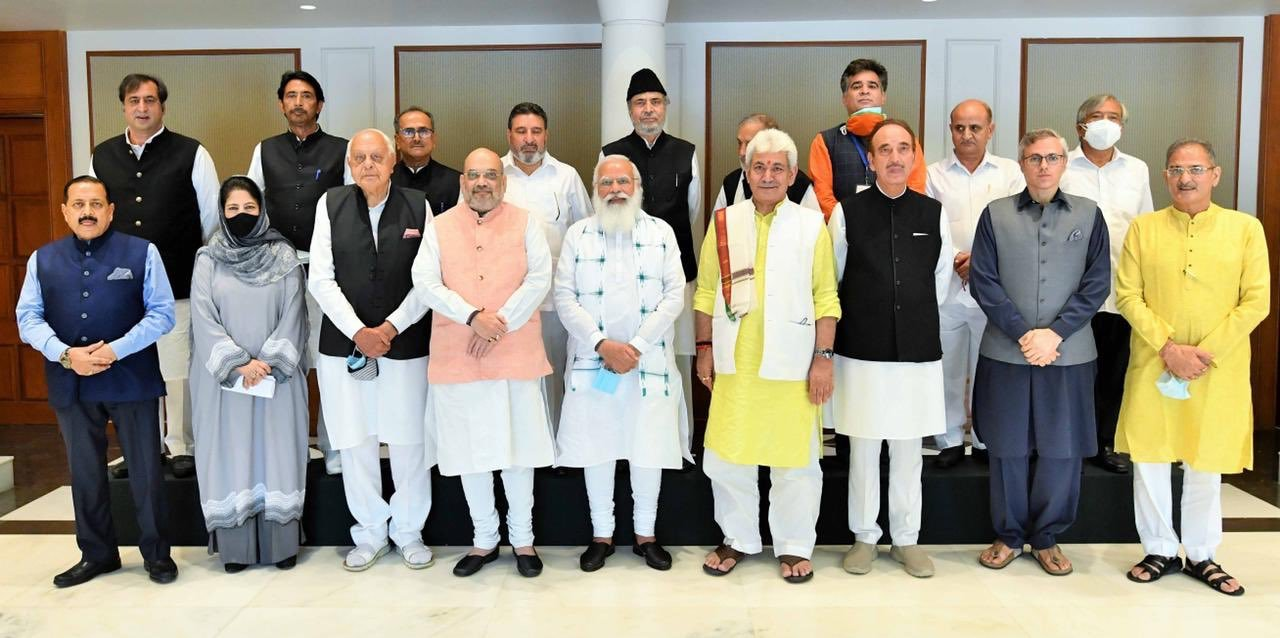
Delegates at the All-Party Meeting at Prime Minister's residence in New Delhi called upon on 24 June 2021. Dr. Nirmal Singh is third from the left in the back row.

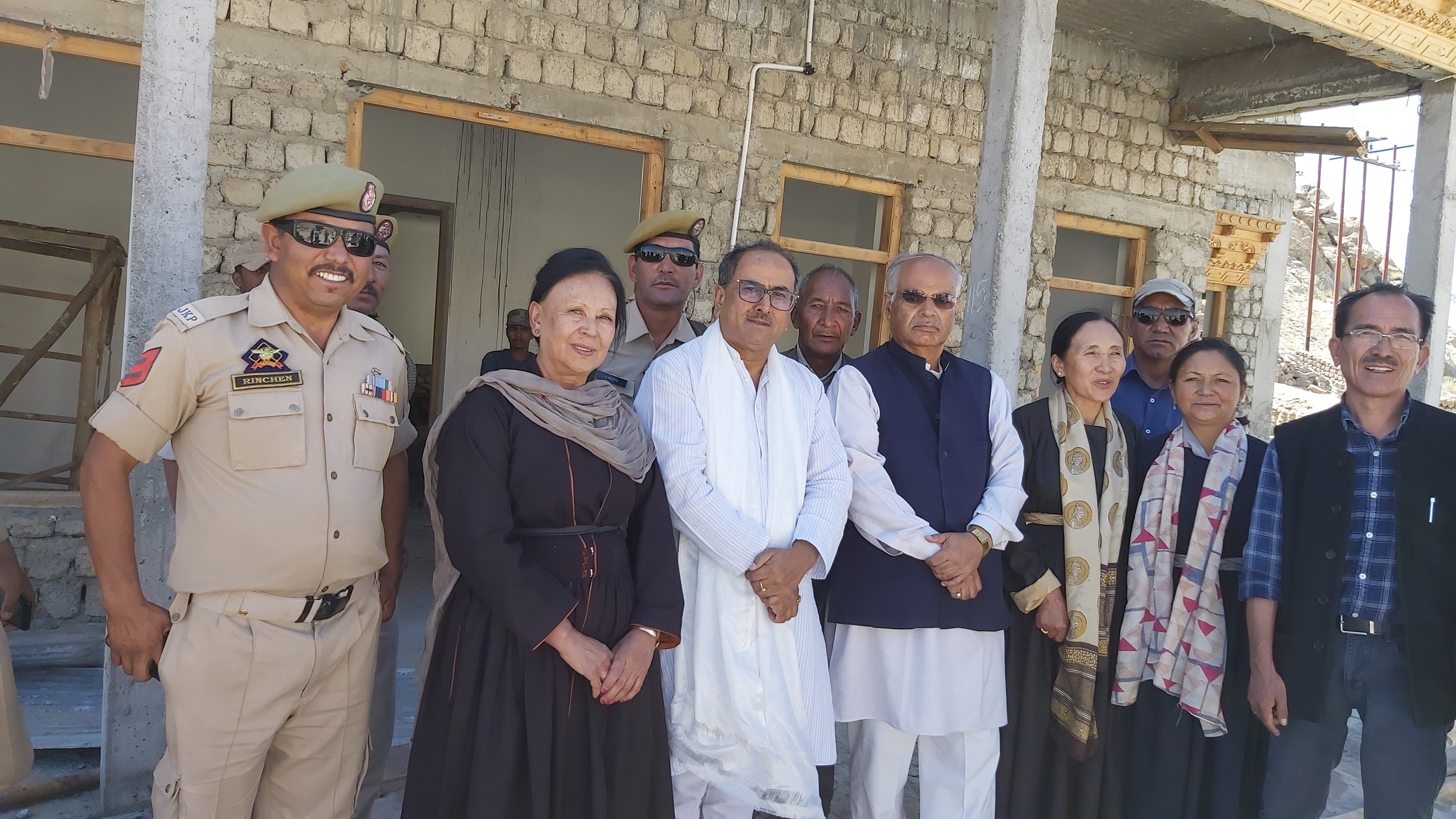
Dr Nirmal Singh, Ashok Kaul, General Secretary (Org.), J&K BJP and other BJP Workers in Leh, Ladakh.

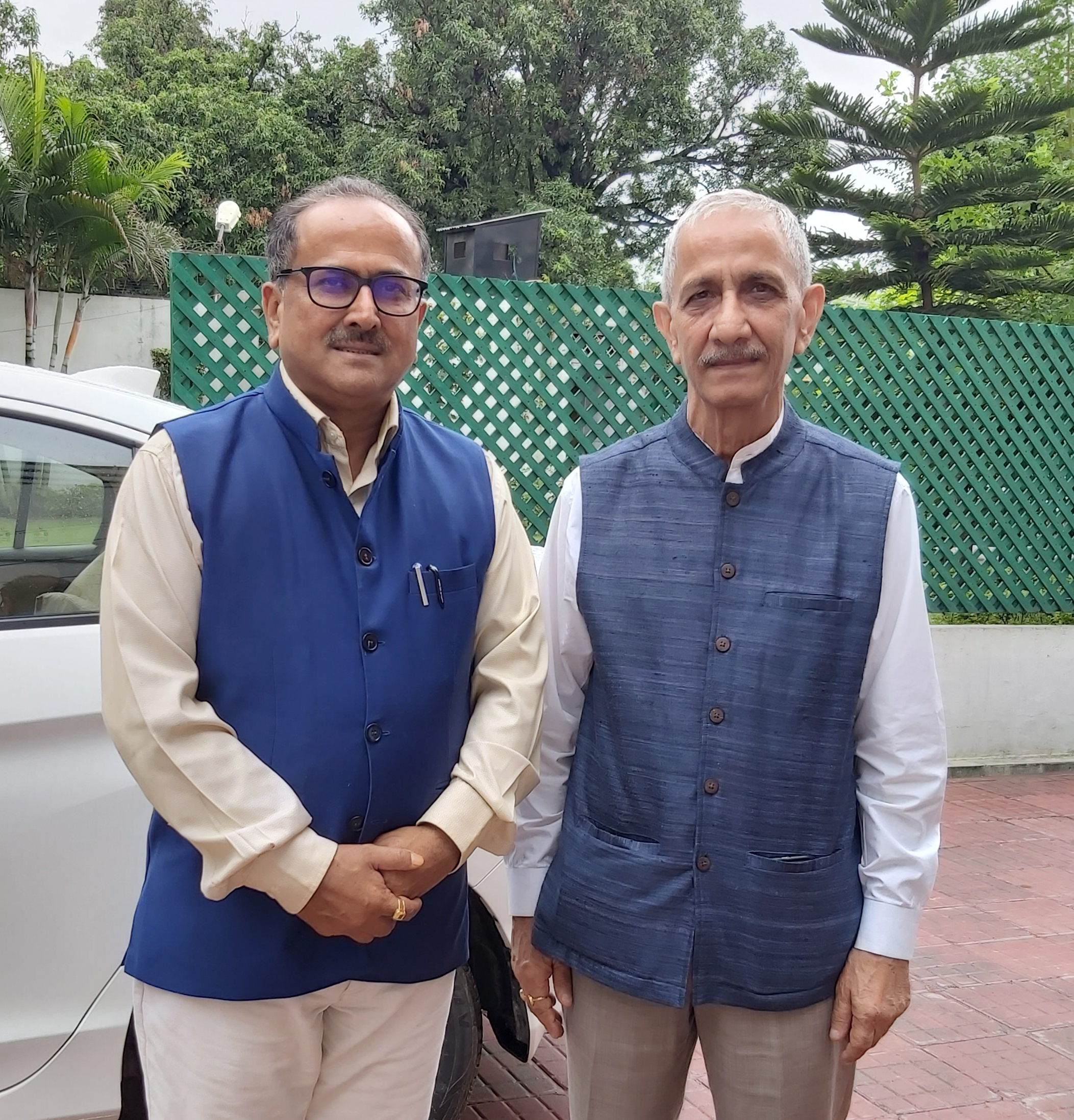
Shri Dineshwar Sharma visited Dr Nirmal Singh's residence at Jammu during his tenure as an Interlocutor to the Government of India for the state of Jammu & Kashmir.

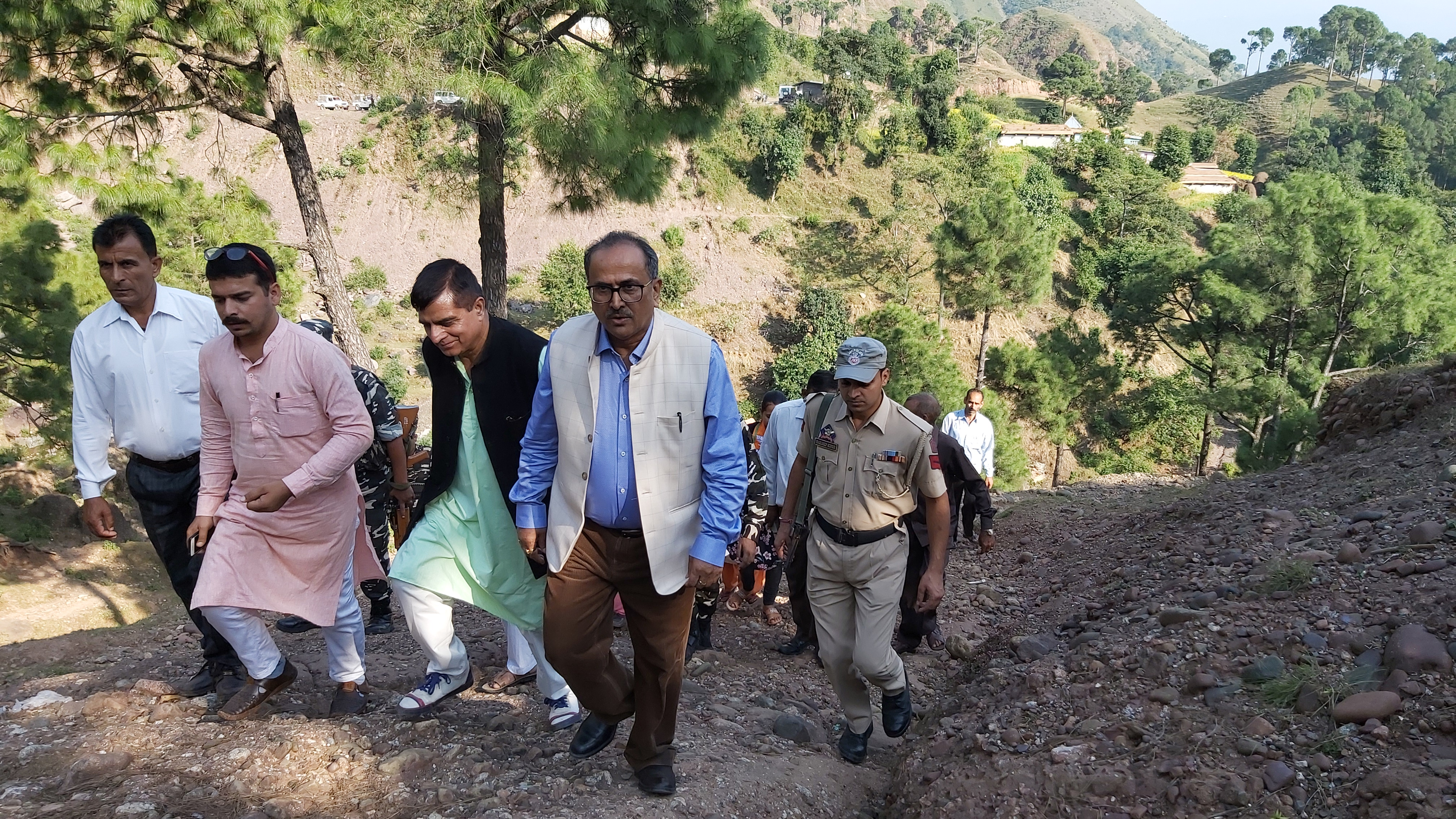
Dr Nirmal Singh tours Dhar Mahanpur, Basohli along with BJP Workers.

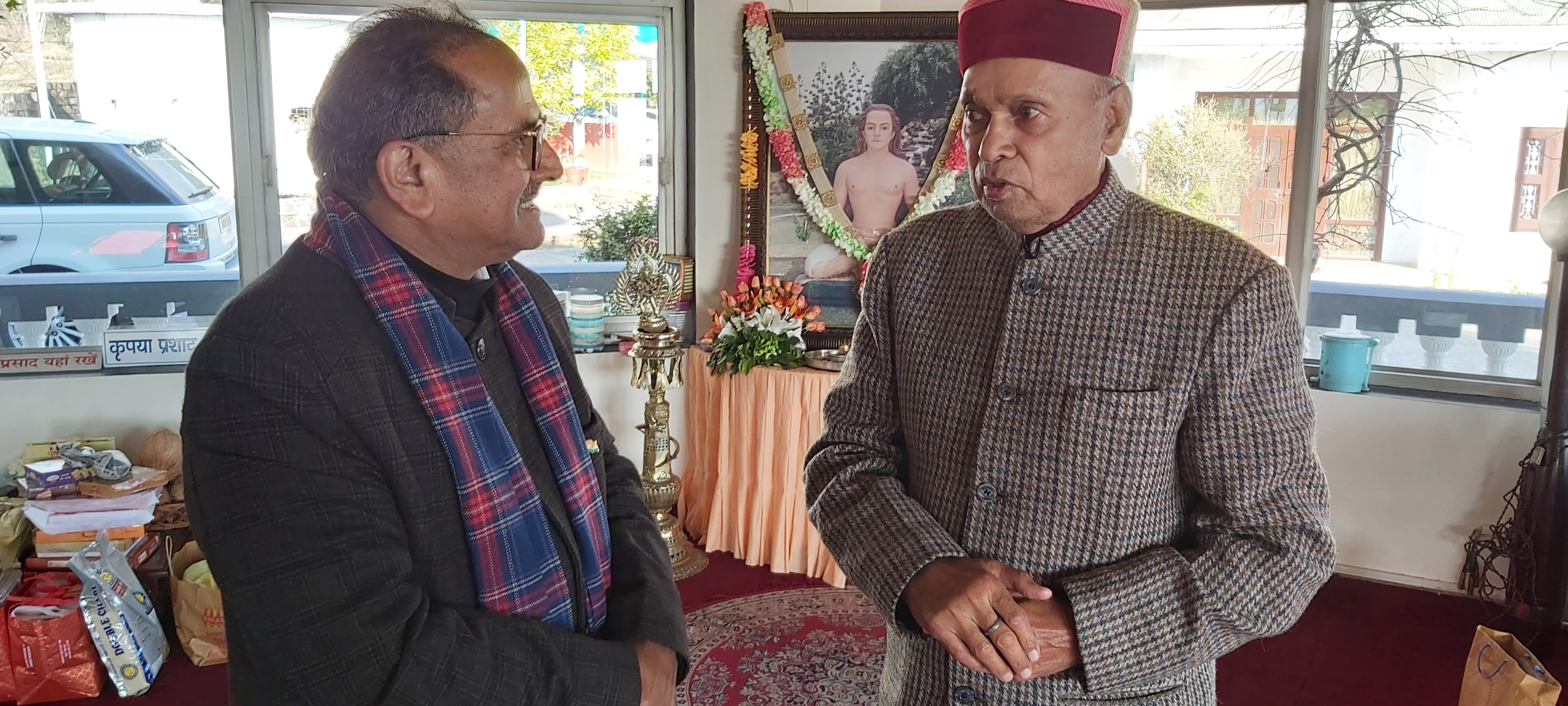
Dr Nirmal Singh and Shri Prem Kumar Dhumal, former Chief Minister of Himachal at Palampur.

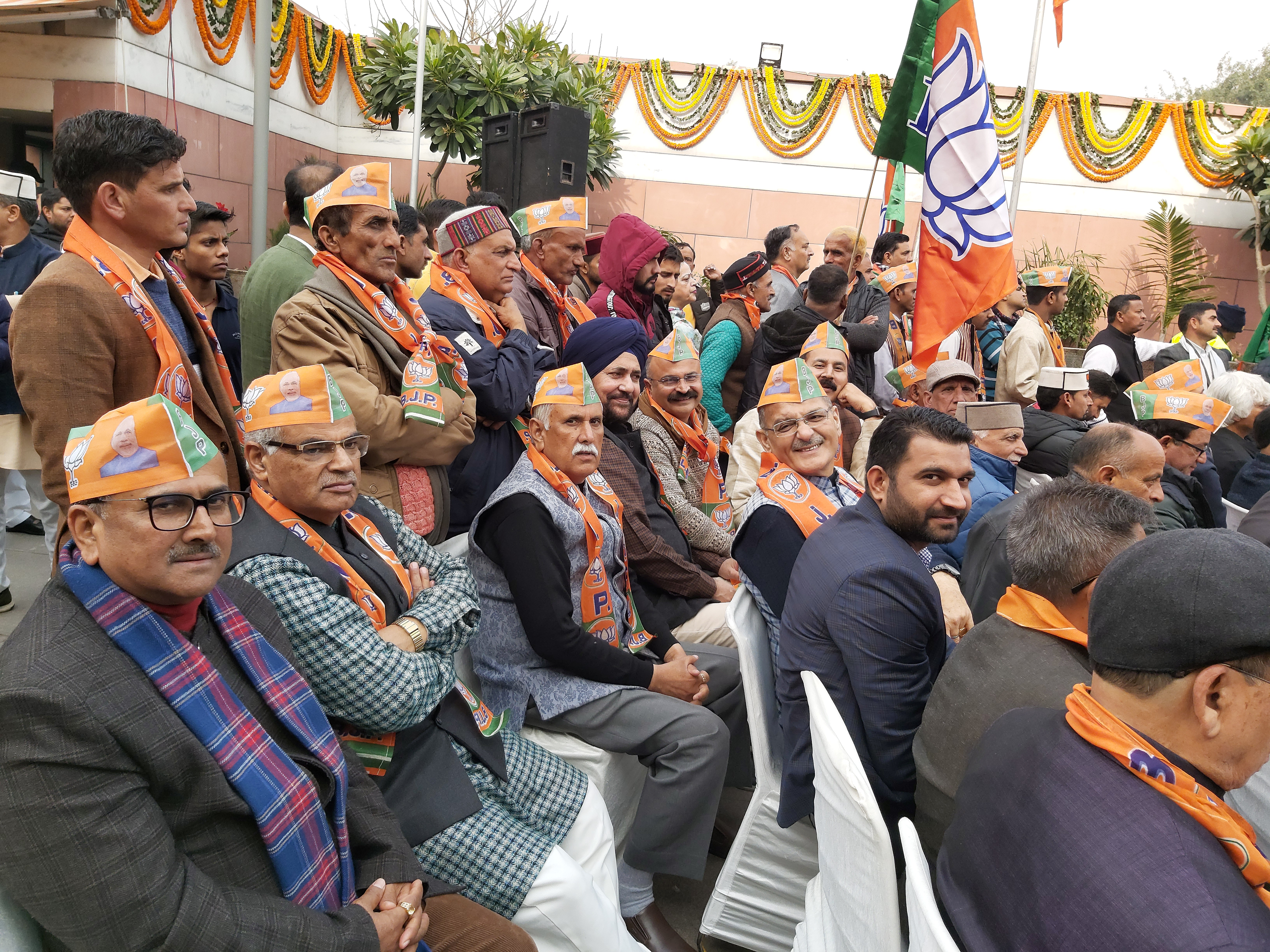
Dr Nirmal Singh, Shamsheer Singh Manhas, Kavinder Gupta and other senior leaders of J&K BJP at the New Delhi BJP HQ for celebrations of the Election of Shri J P Nadda as National President of BJP on 20 Jan 2020.

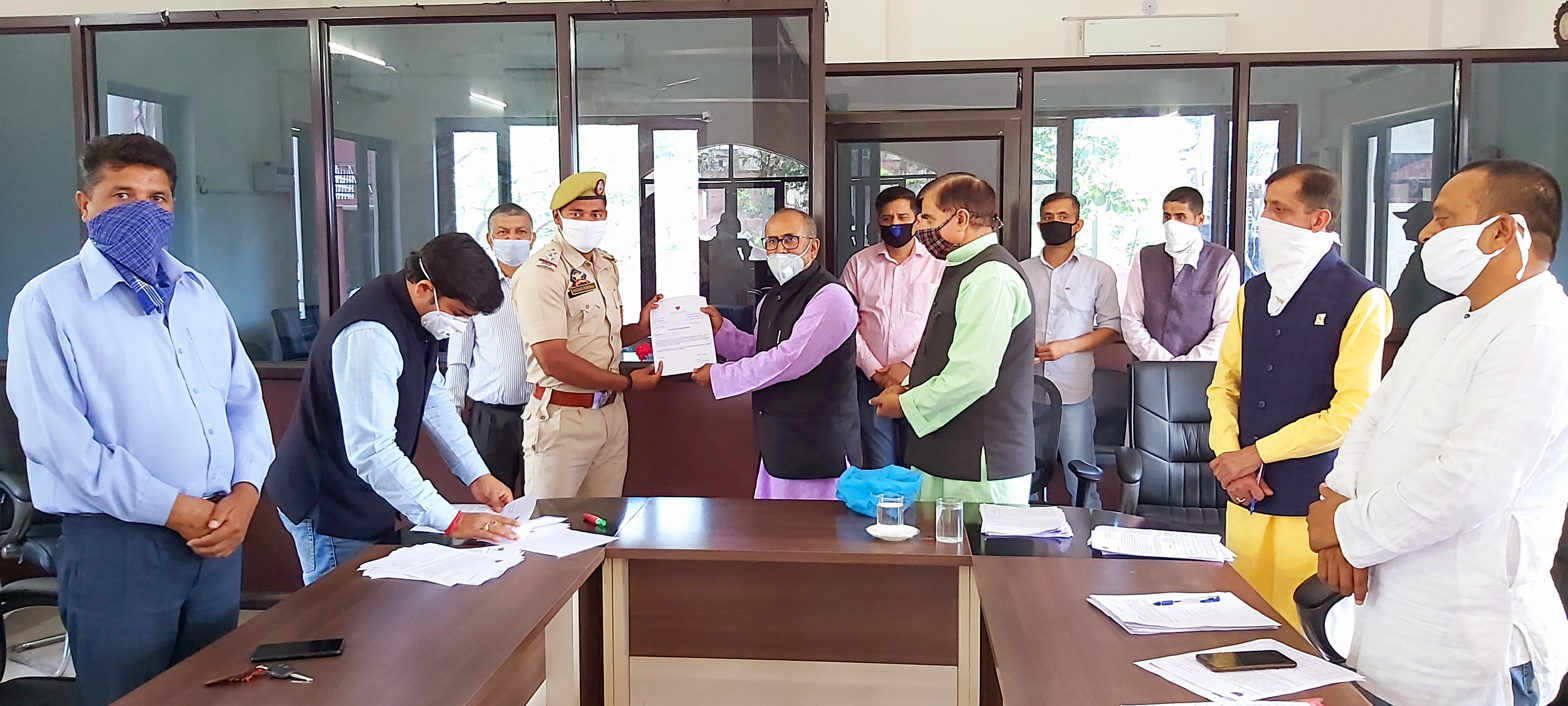
Dr Nirmal Singh felicitating Corona Warriors at his Vidhan Sabha Constituency Billawar.

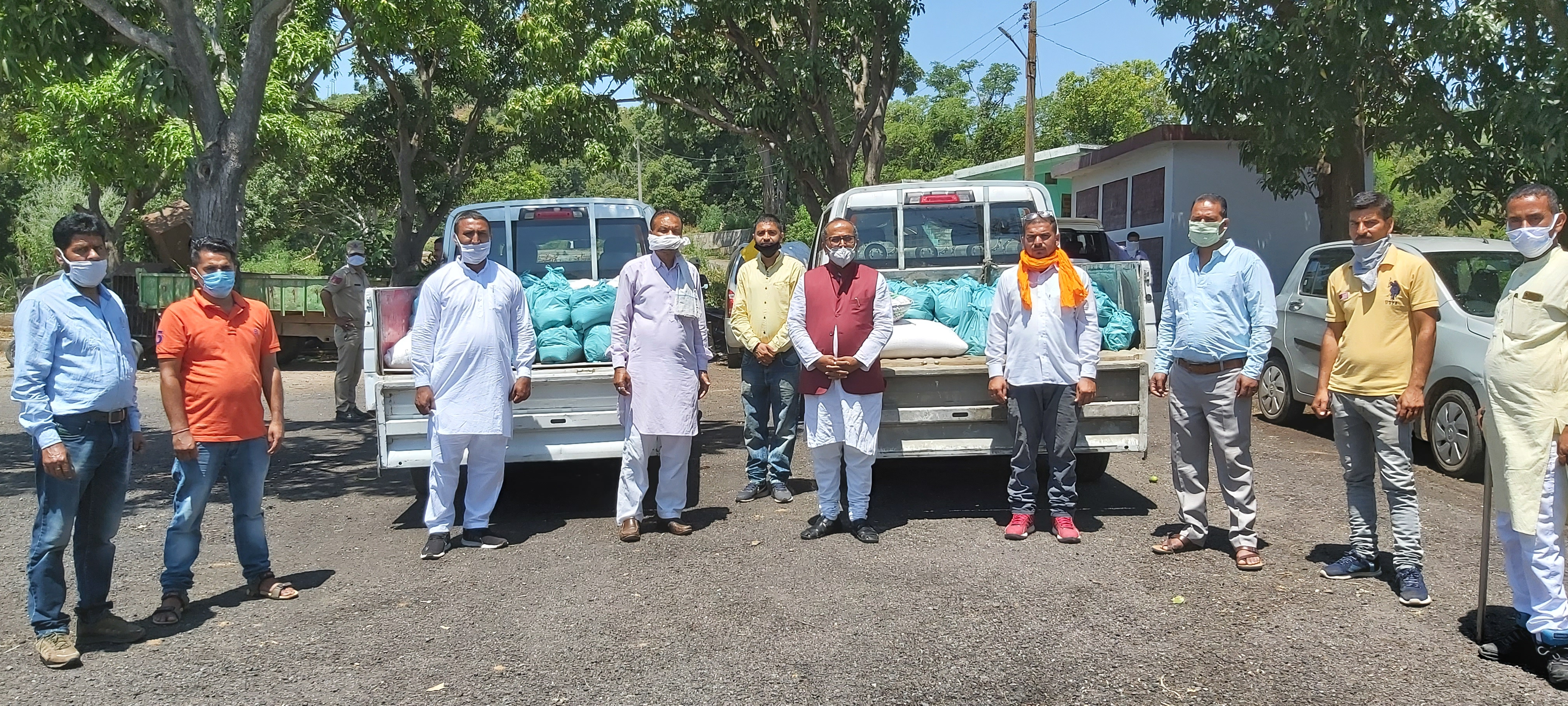
Dr Nirmal Singh flagging off the Relief Material during first wave of COVID-19 pandemic in Mahanpur, Basohli.

Preceded by President's Rule	Deputy Chief Minister of Jammu and Kashmir; 1 March 2015 – 6 January 2016	Succeeded by President's Rule
Preceded by President's Rule	Deputy Chief Minister of Jammu and Kashmir; 4 April 2016 – 29 April 2018	Succeeded by Kavinder Gupta
