= Government of Jammu and Kashmir =

Territorial government of Jammu and Kashmir

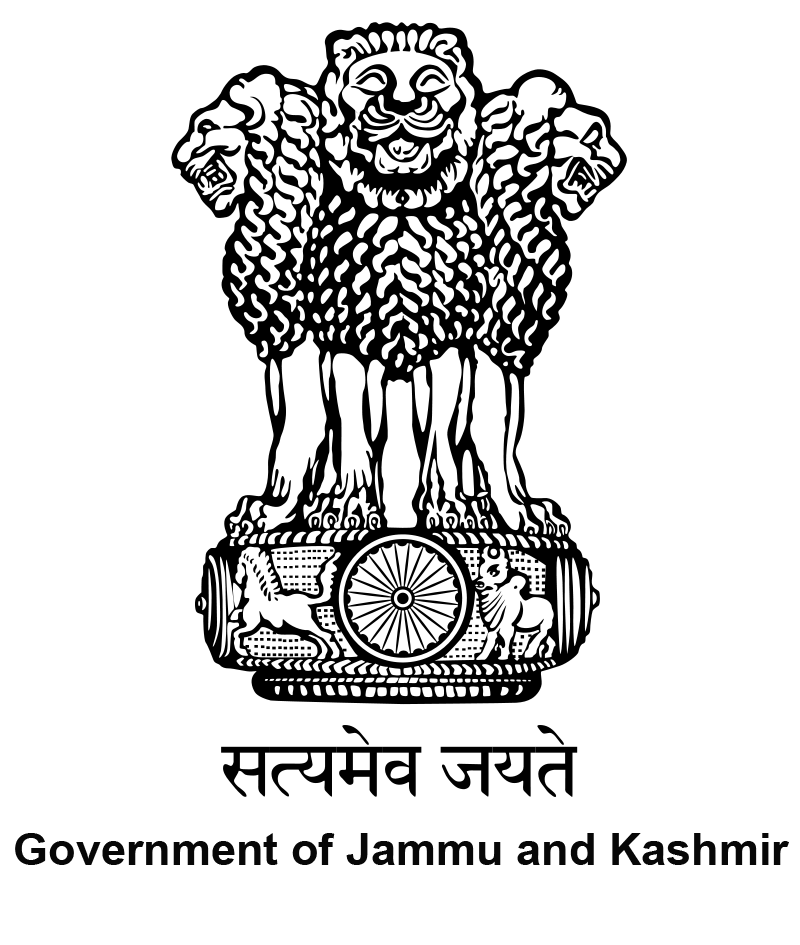
- Seat of Government: Srinagar, Jammu

Legislative branch
- Assembly: Jammu and Kashmir Legislative Assembly
- Speaker: Abdul Rahim Rather
- Members in Assembly: 114 seats (90 seats + 24 seats reserved for Pakistan administered Kashmir)

Executive branch
- Lieutenant Governor: Manoj Sinha
- Chief Minister: Omar Abdullah
- Deputy Chief Minister: Surinder Kumar Choudhary
- Chief Secretary: Dr. Sajjan Singh, IAS

Judiciary
- High Court: Jammu & Kashmir and Ladakh High Court
- Chief Justice: Arun Palli

The Government of Jammu and Kashmir is the principal administrative authority responsible for the governance of the Indian union territory of Jammu and Kashmir. Established on 30 October 1947 as the Government of State of Jammu and Kashmir, and the Government of Union Territory of Jammu and Kashmir after the reorganization of the former state of Jammu and Kashmir in October 2019, the government operates under the framework of the Indian constitution. The union territory comprises two divisions—Jammu and Kashmir—with different cultural and geographical characteristics.

Jammu and Kashmir is a union territory in India under the terms of Article 239A (which was initially applied to Puducherry and is now also applicable to the union territory as per the Jammu and Kashmir Reorganisation Act, 2019) of the Constitution of India. Jammu and Kashmir has executive, legislative and judicial branches of government. Srinagar and Jammu are the summer and winter capitals of Jammu and Kashmir respectively.

== Executive ==
The head of state of Jammu and Kashmir is a lieutenant governor, appointed by the president of India on the advice of the central government. His or her post is largely ceremonial. The chief minister, is the head of government and chairs a council of ministers.

=== Council of Ministers of Jammu and Kashmir ===
A Council of Ministers led by a Chief Minister is appointed by the Lieutenant Governor from the membership of the legislative assembly. Their role is to advise the Lieutenant Governor in the exercise of functions in matters under the jurisdiction of the legislative assembly. In other matters, the Lieutenant Governor is empowered to act in his own capacity.

The council of ministers formed after the 2024 Jammu and Kashmir Legislative Assembly election is as follows:

S.No	Name	Constituency	Department	Assumed office	Party
Chief Minister
1	Omar Abdullah (Chief Minister)	Ganderbal	All other remaining Departments not Allocated to any Ministers shall remain to CM	16 October 2024	JKNC
Deputy Chief Minister
2	Surinder Kumar Choudhary (Deputy Chief Minister)	Nowshera	Labour & Employment, Skill Development, Public Works (R&B), Mining, Industries and Commerce	16 October 2024	JKNC
Cabinet Ministers
3	Sakina Itoo	Damal Hanji Pora	Health and Medical Education, School Education, Higher Education, Social welfare	16 October 2024	JKNC
4	Javid Ahmad Dar	Rafiabad	Agriculture Production, Rural Development and Panchayati Raj, Cooperative & Election	16 October 2024	JKNC
5	Javed Ahmed Rana	Mendhar	Tribal Affairs, Forest Ecology & Environment, Jal Shakti	16 October 2024	JKNC
6	Satish Sharma	Chhamb	Food, Civil Supplies & Consumer Affairs, Transport, Science and Technology, Information Technology, Youth Services and Sports, Ari and Trainings	16 October 2024	Independent

==== Previous ministries ====
- First Mufti Mohammad Sayeed ministry
- First Omar Abdullah ministry
- Second Mufti Mohammad Sayeed ministry
- Mehbooba Mufti ministry

== Legislative ==
The legislative branch is of government is a unicameral legislative assembly, whose tenure is five years. The legislative assembly may make laws for any of the matters in the State List of the Constitution of India except "public order" and "police", which will remain the preserve of the central Government of India. The Lieutenant Governor also has the power to promulgate ordinances which have the same force as the acts of the legislative assembly.

The most recent election for the Jammu and Kashmir Legislative Assembly was held in September and October 2024. The membership of the assembly by party is as follows:

Membership by party in the 1st Jammu and Kashmir UT Assembly

Party	MLAs
JKNC	42
BJP	29
INC	6
JKPDP	3
AAP	1
CPI(M)	1
Independent	7
Nominated	5
Total	95

== Judicial ==
The union territory is under the jurisdiction of the High Court of Jammu & Kashmir and Ladakh, which also serves as high court for neighbouring Ladakh. Police services are provided by the Jammu and Kashmir Police.

== Local government ==
Local governance is carried out through the Panchayati Raj Institutions at rural level and Municipalities at urban level. The Jammu and Kashmir Panchayati Raj Act, 1989 defines its structure, powers, and elections. In rural areas, there are Halqa Panchayats for a village or group of villages, and at the block level there are Block Development Councils; blocks are constituted by a group of Halqa Panchayats, and at the district level there are District Development Councils. There are a total of 4,291 panchayat halqas, 285 blocks, and 20 district development councils for rural governance. Urban areas such as cities and towns are governed by Municipal Corporations and Municipalities, constituted under the Jammu and Kashmir Municipalities Act, 2000. There are two municipal corporations; Jammu Municipal Corporation and Srinagar Municipal Corporation.

The districts elect 14 member District Development Councils.

== Agencies ==
In 2018, Jammu and Kashmir Infrastructure Development Finance Corporation (JKIDFC) was set up to speed up languishing infrastructure development in the union territory.
