= Second Omar Abdullah ministry =

Council of ministers headed by Omar Abdullah (2024–present)

- 18th Ministry of Jammu and Kashmir
- Omar Abdullah
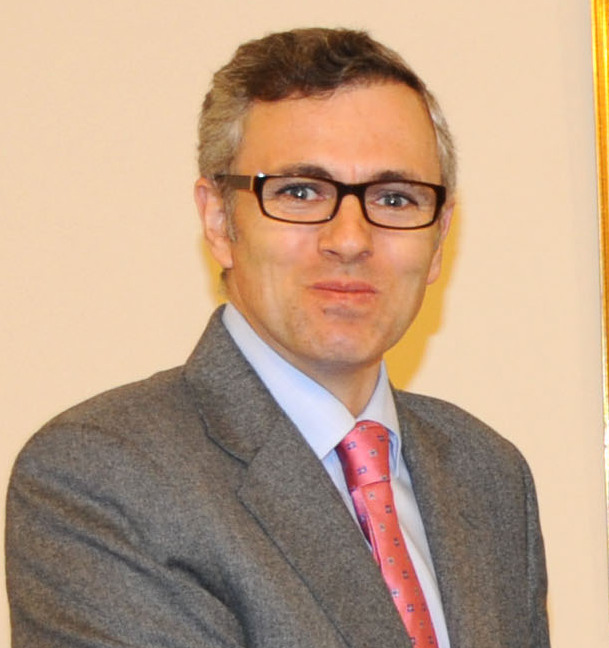
- Date formed: 16 October 2024

People and organisations
- Lieutenant Governor: Manoj Sinha
- Chief Minister: Omar Abdullah
- Deputy Chief Minister: Surinder Kumar Choudhary
- No. of ministers: 9 (incl. Chief Minister)
- Member party: JKNC (9)
- Status in legislature: Coalition government
- Opposition party: BJP
- Opposition leader: Sunil Kumar Sharma

History
- Election: 2024 election
- Legislature term: 1st (UT) (2024–present)
- Predecessor: Mehbooba Mufti ministry (state)

The second Omar Abdullah ministry was formed on 16 October 2024, following the elections of Jammu and Kashmir Legislative Assembly in 2024, with Omar Abdullah as first Chief Minister of the union territory of Jammu and Kashmir.

== Background ==
In 2018, following the dissolution of the Mehbooba Mufti ministry, the Government of India imposed President's rule in Jammu and Kashmir. After 2019 Lok Sabha election, the BJP government revoked Article 370 and Article 35A in Jammu and Kashmir, which gave its semi-autonomous status and degraded as a Union Territory along with Ladakh.

Under Jammu and Kashmir Reorganisation Act, 2019, the upper house (Legislative Council) is dissolved. The delimitation commission in 2022, recommended re-redistricting the seats to 90 members. In 2023, the Supreme Court advised the Election Commission to conduct the election before September 2024.

On 8 October 2024, INDIA bloc, comprising National Conference, Congress and Communist Party of India (Marxist) won 49 seats, staking to form a government after their victory in the 2024 election. On 10 October, the National Conference voted its Vice President Abdullah as its leader of the National Conference in the J&K Assembly. Later on four Independents as declared their support to Abdullah as Chief Minister. On 11 October Omar Abdullah met with the Lieutenant Governor of Jammu and Kashmir, Manoj Sinha, and was sworn in as Chief Minister on 16 October 2024. The swearing-in ceremony, held at Sher-e-Kashmir International Conference Centre (SKICC), was presided over by Lieutenant Governor Manoj Sinha. Omar was joined by Surinder Kumar Choudhary, Sakeena Masood, Javid Ahmad Dar, Javed Ahmed Rana and Satish Sharma on the dias to take the oath of office as his council of ministers.

On 18 October 2024, an order was issued by Lieutenant Governor Sinha to allocate portfolios to council of ministers on the advice of chief minister.

== Council of Ministers ==
S.No	Name	Constituency	Department	Assumed office	Left office	Party
Chief Minister
1	Omar Abdullah	Ganderbal	Any department that is not allotted to any other Minister	16 October 2024	Incumbent	JKNC
Deputy Chief Minister
2	Surinder Kumar Choudhary	Nowshera	Public Works (R&B); Industries & Commerce Mining; Labour & Employment and Skill Development	16 October 2024	Incumbent	JKNC
Cabinet Ministers
3	Sakina Itoo	Damal Hanji Pora	Health & Medical Education; School Education; Higher Education and Social Welfare	16 October 2024	Incumbent	JKNC
4	Javid Ahmad Dar	Rafiabad	Agriculture Production; Rural Development & Panchayati Raj; Cooperative, and Election.	16 October 2024	Incumbent	JKNC
5	Javed Ahmed Rana	Mendhar	Jal Shakti; Forest; Ecology & Environment and Tribal Affairs	16 October 2024	Incumbent	JKNC
6	Ali Mohammad Sagar	Khanyar	Revenue; Power Development; Law and Justice; Parliamentary Affairs; Disaster Management, Relief, Rehabilitation and Reconstruction (DMRRR); Election Department.	27 October 2026	Incumbent	JKNC
7	Shamim Firdous	Habba Kadal	TBD	27 October 2026	Incumbent	JKNC
8	Saifullah Mir	Trehgam	TBD	27 October 2026	Incumbent	JKNC
9	Altaf Ahmad Wani	Pahalgam	TBD	27 October 2026	Incumbent	JKNC

== Former Ministers ==
S.No	Name	Constituency	Department	Assumed office	Left office	Party
1.	Satish Sharma	Chhamb	Food, Civil Supplies & Consumer Affairs; Transport, Science & Technology; Information Technology; Youth Services & Sports; ARI & Training.	16 October 2024	27 October 2026	IND

== Demographics ==
=== By Region ===
Ministers by district (Note: Based on the location of the assembly constituency from which the corresponding member was elected from.)
#	District	Ministers	Name
1	Anantnag	1	Altaf Ahmad Wani
2	Bandipora	0	
3	Baramulla	1	Javid Ahmad Dar
4	Budgam	0	
5	Doda	0	
6	Ganderbal	1	Omar Abdullah (Chief Minister)
7	Jammu	1	Satish Sharma (Former)
8	Kathua	0	
9	Kishtwar	0	
10	Kulgam	1	Sakina Itoo
11	Kupwara	1	Saifullah Mir
12	Poonch	1	Javed Ahmed Rana
13	Pulwama	0	
14	Rajouri	1	Surinder Kumar Choudhary (Deputy Chief Minister)
15	Ramban	0	
16	Reasi	0	
17	Samba	0	
18	Shopian	0	
19	Srinagar	2	Ali Mohammad Sagar; Shamim Firdous
20	Udhampur	0	

=== By Parties ===
Party	Total number of ministers
Jammu and Kashmir National Conference	9
Independent politician	1 (Former)
Total	10

Representation of cabinet ministers by party
1. Jammu and Kashmir National Conference (90.0%)
2. Independent (10.0%)

== See also ==
- Government of Jammu and Kashmir
- First Omar Abdullah ministry
