= Vessu =

- Block/ Nayabat
- Location in Jammu and Kashmir, India Vessu (India)
- Coordinates: 33.666660°N 75.124305°E
- Country: India
- State: Jammu and Kashmir
- District: Anantnag
- Elevation: 1,670 m (5,480 ft)

Population (2001)
  - Total: 1,500

Languages
  - Official: Kashmiri, Urdu, Hindi, Dogri, English
- Time zone: UTC+5:30 (IST)
- Vehicle registration: JK03

Vessu is a Block and Nayabat in Anantnag district in Indian union territory of Jammu and Kashmir. It is located on Srinagar Jammu National Highway, 10 km from Khanabal. The river "Saandrun", which originates from the famous kapran, lies to its East. National Highway 1A marks the boundary of this place towards its Western and Northern end.

== Demographics ==
Vessu was given the status of block in February/March 2014.

== Education ==
Vessu has a literacy rate of more than 87% (Census of India, 2011). This is highest in Kashmir Valley and much higher than the national average of India. There is a computerized branch of Jammu & Kashmir Bank providing banking services since 2010. One of the famous government recognised private schools in district Anantnag — Iqbal Public High school Vessu, has been catering education since 1986, not only for local people but also for adjoining areas. Dreamland Educational Institute, Government Girls Middle School, and Government Primary School are also playing roles in spreading education, Government Higher secondary school is the only higher education Institute within the vicinity of vessu in between qazigund and anantnag town which was previously designated as govt high school vessu incorporated by jk govt since 1960.
