= List of deputy chief ministers of Jammu and Kashmir =

Deputy head of government in UT

Deputy Chief Minister of Jammu and Kashmir
- Emblem of Jammu and Kashmir

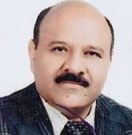
- Incumbent; Surinder Kumar Choudhary since 16 October 2024
- Government of Jammu and Kashmir
- Style: Mahoday/Mahodaya: (In India); The Honourable (Formal); Mr. Deputy CM (Informal); Shri (In India)
- Type: Deputy Head of Government
- Status: Deputy Leader of the Executive
- Abbreviation: DCM
- Member of: Cabinet; Jammu and Kashmir Legislative Assembly
- Reports to: Chief Minister of Jammu and Kashmir; Jammu and Kashmir Legislative Assembly
- Seat: Civil Secretariat Jammu, Old Heritage City, Jammu and Kashmir
- Nominator: Members of the Government of Jammu and Kashmir in Jammu and Kashmir Legislative Assembly
- Appointer: Lieutenant Governor of Jammu and Kashmir on the advice of the Chief Minister of Jammu and Kashmir
- Term length: At the confidence of the assembly Deputy Chief minister's term is for five years and is subject to no term limits.
- Inaugural holder: Bakshi Ghulam Mohammad
- Formation: 5 March 1948 (78 years ago)
- Website: Official website

The deputy chief minister of Jammu and Kashmir is the title given to the deputy head of government of Jammu and Kashmir. The state was reconstituted by the government of India as the union territory of Jammu and Kashmir on 31 October 2019. The position of deputy chief minister is not explicitly defined or mentioned in the Constitution of India. However, the Supreme Court of India has stated that the appointment of deputy chief ministers is not unconstitutional. The court has clarified that a deputy chief minister, for all practical purposes, remains a minister in the council of ministers headed by the chief minister and does not draw a higher salary or perks compared to other ministers.During the absence of the chief minister, the deputy-chief minister may chair cabinet meetings and lead the assembly majority. Various deputy chief ministers have also taken the oath of secrecy in line with the one that chief minister takes. This oath has also sparked controversies.

== Deputy prime and chief ministers of Jammu and Kashmir ==
Keys:
Bharatiya Janata Party Jammu and Kashmir National Conference Jammu & Kashmir Peoples Democratic Party Indian National Congress

Sr. no.	Photo	Name	Took office	Left office	Duration	Political party
Deputy Prime Minister of the State of Jammu and Kashmir
1		Bakshi Ghulam Mohammad	5 March 1948	9 August 1953	5 years, 157 days	Jammu and Kashmir National Conference
Deputy chief ministers of Jammu and Kashmir
2		Mirza Afzal Beg	25 February 1975	25 September 1978	4 years, 212 days	Jammu and Kashmir National Conference
3		Devi Das Thakur	2 July 1984	6 March 1986	1 year, 247 days	Jammu and Kashmir National Conference
4		Mangat Ram Sharma	2 November 2002	2 November 2005	3 years, 0 days	Indian National Congress
5		Muzaffar Hussain Baig	2 November 2005	11 July 2008	2 years, 252 days	Jammu & Kashmir Peoples Democratic Party
6		Tara Chand	5 January 2009	24 December 2014	5 years, 353 days	Indian National Congress
7		Nirmal Kumar Singh	1 March 2015	6 January 2016	311 days	Bharatiya Janata Party
7		Nirmal Kumar Singh	4 April 2016	29 April 2018	2 years, 25 days	Bharatiya Janata Party
8		Kavinder Gupta	30 April 2018	19 June 2018	50 days	Bharatiya Janata Party
9		Surinder Kumar Choudhary	16 October 2024	Incumbent	1 year, 326 days	Jammu and Kashmir National Conference

== Statistics ==
List of deputy prime ministers/chief ministers by length of term

No.	Name	Party	Length of term	
No.	Name	Party	Longest continuous term	Total years of deputy chief ministership
1	Tara Chand	INC	5 years, 353 days	5 years, 353 days
2	Bakshi Ghulam Mohammad	JKNC	5 years, 157 days	5 years, 157 days
3	Mirza Afzal Beg	JKNC	4 years, 212 days	4 years, 212 days
4	Mangat Ram Sharma	INC	3 years, 0 days	3 years, 0 days
5	Muzaffar Hussain Baig	JKPDP	2 years, 252 days	2 years, 252 days
6	Nirmal Kumar Singh	BJP	2 years, 336 days	2 years, 336 days
7	Devi Das Thakur	JKNC	1 year, 247 days	1 year, 247 days
8	Surinder Kumar Choudhary	JKNC	1 year, 326 days	1 year, 326 days
9	Kavinder Gupta	BJP	50 days	50 days

== See also ==
- List of chief ministers of Jammu and Kashmir
- Government of Jammu and Kashmir

== Oath as the state deputy chief minister ==
The deputy chief minister serves five years in the office. The following is the oath of the Deputy chief minister of state:

I, <Name of Deputy Chief Minister>, do swear in the name of God/solemnly affirm that I will bear true faith and allegiance to the Constitution of India as by law established, that I will uphold the sovereignty and integrity of India, that I will faithfully and conscientiously discharge my duties as a Minister for the State of () and that I will do right to all manner of people in accordance with the Constitution and the law without fear or favour, affection or ill-will.

Oath of Secrecy

"I, [Name], do swear in the name of God / solemnly affirm that I will not directly or indirectly communicate or reveal to any person or persons any matter which shall be brought under my consideration or shall become known to me as a Minister for the State of [Name of State] except as may be required for the due discharge of my duties as such Minister.1. Oath of Office (Ohde Ka Halaf) Text: "Main, [Aap ka Naam], khuda ke naam par halaf uthata hoon / iqrar karta hoon ke main qanoon ke mutabiq qayam-shuda Bharat ke Aaeen (Constitution) par sacha aqeeda aur wafadari rakhunga, Ke main Bharat ki khud-mukhtari (sovereignty) aur ikhtiyar-e-aala (integrity) ko barqarar rakhunga, Ke main [Riyasat ka Naam] ke Waziri-e-Aala (Chief Minister) ke taur par apne faraiz (duties) ko wafadari aur poori dyanatdari se anjam doonga, Aur main baghair kisi khauf ya tarafdari, dosti ya dushmani ke, sabhi tarah ke logon ke sath Aaeen aur qanoon ke mutabiq insaf karoonga." 2. Oath of Secrecy (Raazdari Ka Halaf) Text: "Main, [Aap ka Naam], khuda ke naam par halaf uthata hoon / iqrar karta hoon ke jo koi bhi mamla [Riyasat ka Naam] ke Waziri-e-Aala (Chief Minister) ke taur par mere samne laya jayega ya mujhe maloom hoga, Use main kisi bhi shakhs ya ashkhash (persons) ko, us waqt ke siwaye jab ke aise Waziri-e-Aala ke taur par apne faraiz ki dharstgi (discharge) ke liye aisa karna zaroori ho, bil-wasta (directly) ya bila-wasta (indirectly) zahir ya bayaan nahi karoonga."
