= First Sayeed ministry =

- Ministry of Jammu and Kashmir
- Date formed: 2 November 2002
- Date dissolved: 2 November 2005

People and organisations
- Governor: Girish Chandra Saxena; Srinivas Kumar Sinha
- Chief Minister: Mufti Mohammad Sayeed
- Deputy Chief Minister: Mangat Ram Sharma
- No. of ministers: 9
- Member parties: JKPDP; INC; JKNPP; Independent
- Status in legislature: Coalition government

History
- Election: 2002 Jammu and Kashmir Legislative Assembly election
- Predecessor: Governor's rule
- Successor: Ghulam Nabi Azad ministry

Mufti Mohammad Sayeed was sworn in as Chief Minister of Jammu and Kashmir on 2 November 2002. The list of ministers:

== Cabinet ministers ==
Sno.	Name	Office	Constituency	Portfolio	Party	Took Office	Left Office
1	Mufti Mohammad Sayeed	Chief Minister	Pahalgam	Home Affairs; Department not assigned to any cabinet minister	JKPDP	2 November 2002	2 November 2005
2	Mangat Ram Sharma	Deputy Chief Minister	Jammu West		INC	2 November 2002	2 November 2005
3	Muzaffar Hussain Baig	Cabinet Minister	Baramulla	Law; Parliamentary Affairs; Finance	JKPDP	2 November 2002	2 November 2005
4	Peerzada Mohammad Syed	Cabinet Minister	Kokernag		INC	2 November 2002	2 November 2005
5	Ghulam Hassan Mir	Cabinet Minister	Gulmarg	Tourism	JKPDP	2 November 2002	2 November 2005
6	Mula Ram	Cabinet Minister	Raipur Domana	Social Justice	INC	2 November 2002	2 November 2005
7	Harsh Dev Singh	Cabinet Minister	Ramnagar	Education	JKNPP	2 November 2002	2 November 2005
8	Nawang Rigzin Jora	Minister of State	Leh	Urban Development; Urban Local Bodies	Ind	2 November 2002	2 November 2005
9	Haji Nissar Ali	Minister of State	Kargil		Ind	2 November 2002	2 November 2005
