= Asiya Naqash =

Indian politician

Jammu and Kashmir Legislative Assembly
- In office 2014 – June 2018
- Constituency: Hazratbal

Former Minister of state

Personal details
- Party: Jammu and Kashmir Peoples Democratic Party
- Education: University of Kashmir

Asiya Naqash a.k.a. Asiea Naqash is an Indian politician and the former member of the Jammu and Kashmir Legislative Assembly, who represented Hazratbal constituency from 2014 to June 2018 until the coalition government was ended by the Bhartiya Janata Party and Jammu and Kashmir Peoples Democratic Party in the state. She lost her seat in 2024 by a whopping margin of over 10,000 votes to Salman Sagar of Jammu and Kashmir National Conference.

== Career ==
Asiya's career began in 2002 when she established political associations with Jammu and Kashmir Peoples Democratic Party, and later in 2014 Jammu and Kashmir Legislative Assembly election, she was elected from Hazratbal Srinagar. She has served as the minister of state for Health & Medical Education, Housing & Urban Development, Industries and commerce, Power Development, and Social Welfare. She lost her seat in 2024 by a whopping margin of over 10,000 votes to Salman Sagar of Jammu and Kashmir National Conference.
