= First Omar Abdullah ministry =

Government of Jammu and Kashmir, India (2009–2015)

- Ministry of State of Jammu and Kashmir

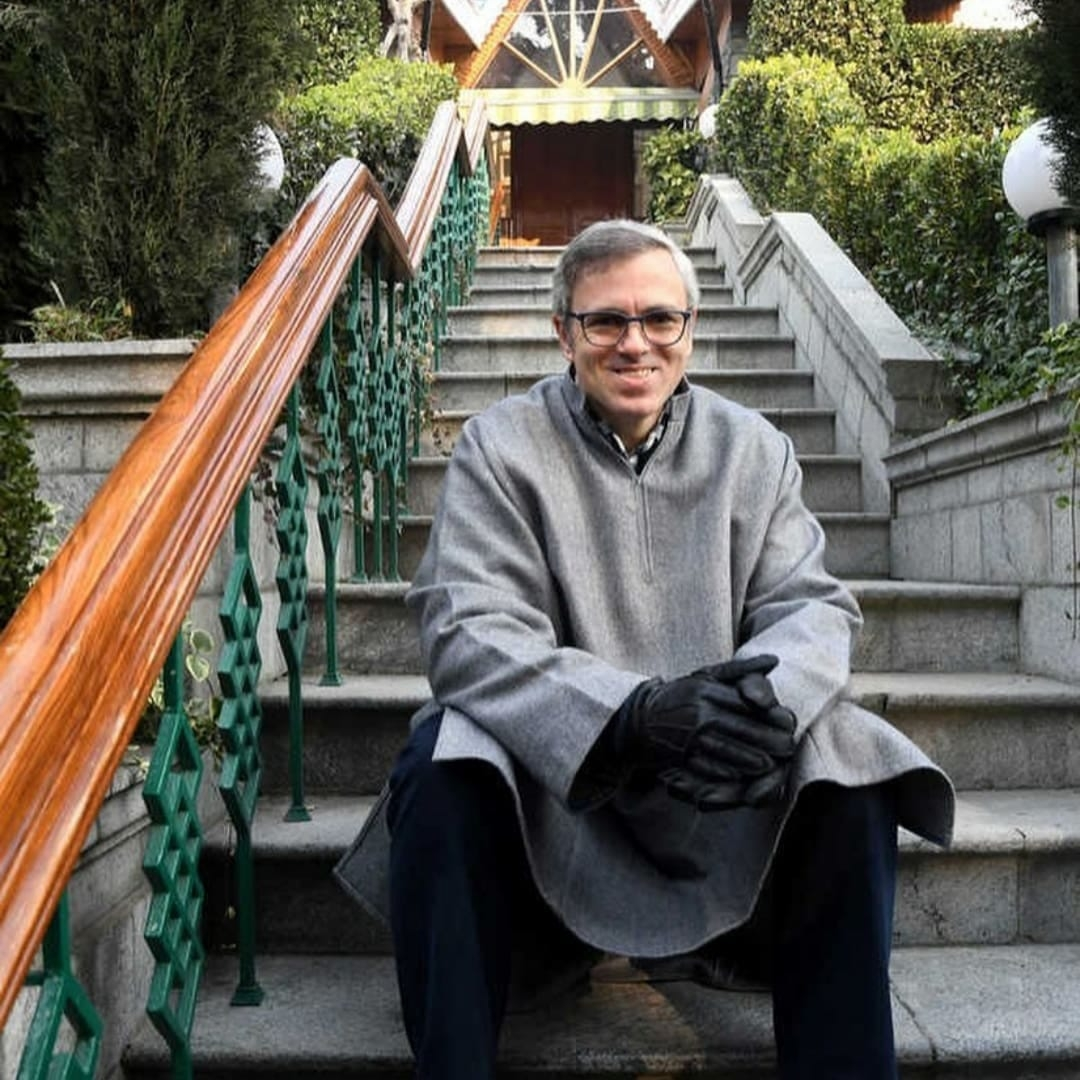
- Omar Abdullah; Hon'ble Chief Minister of Jammu and Kashmir
- Date formed: 5 January 2009
- Date dissolved: 8 January 2015

People and organisations
- Head of state: Governor; N. N. Vohra
- Head of government: Omar Abdullah
- Member parties: JKNC; INC
- Opposition party: JKPDP
- Opposition leader: Mehbooba Mufti (assembly)

History
- Incoming formation: 2008
- Election: 2008
- Legislature term: 6 years
- Predecessor: Ghulam Nabi Azad ministry
- Successor: Second Mufti Mohammad Sayeed ministry

Omar Abdullah was sworn in as Chief Minister of Jammu and Kashmir on 5 January 2009. The list of ministers:

== Cabinet ministers ==
Portfolio	Minister	Took office	Left office	Party
Chief Minister; Other departments not allocated to any Minister	Omar Abdullah	5 January 2009	8 January 2015	JKNC
Deputy Chief Minister	Tara Chand	5 January 2009	8 January 2015	INC
Minister of Social Welfare, Ari Trainings and Public Grievances	Sakina Itoo	5 January 2009	8 January 2015	JKNC
Minister of School Education and Public Enterprises	Peerzada Mohammad Sayeed	5 January 2009	8 January 2015	INC
Minister of Forest, Ecology and Environment	Mian Altaf Ahmed Larvi	5 January 2009	8 January 2015	JKNC
Minister of Public Health Engineering, Irrigation and Flood control	Taj Mohiuddin	5 January 2009	8 January 2015	INC
Minister of Urban Development and Urban Local Bodies, Tourism and culture	Nawang Rigzin Jora	5 January 2009	8 January 2015	INC
Minister of Industries and Commerce	Surjeet Singh Slathia	11 July 2009	8 January 2015	JKNC
Minister of Health, Horticulture and Floriculture	Sham Lal Sharma	5 January 2009	8 January 2015	INC
Minister of Consumer Affairs, Public Distribution and Transport	Qamar Ali Akhoon	11 July 2009	15 January 2013	JKNC
Minister of Technical Education, Youth Services & Sports and Medical Education	R.S. Chib	11 July 2009	15 January 2013	INC

1. Sakina Itoo - Minister for Social Welfare and Administrative Reforms, Inspections, Trainings & Public Grievances
2. Ali Mohammad Sagar (JKNC) - Minister for Rural Development and Panchayats, Law & Parliamentary Affairs
3. Mohammad Akbar Lone (JKNC) - Minister for Higher Education
4. Chowdhary Mohammad Ramzan
5. Nasir Aslam Wani Minister of State for Tourism & Culture, Housing & Urban Development, PHE, Revenue & Relief
6. Mir Saifullah
7. Nazir Ahmed Khan Gurezi
8. Feroz Ahmed Khan MOS Information and Technology
9. Sajjad Ahmed Kichloo
10. Ajay Sadhotra
11. Ghulam Ahmad Mir (INC)
12. Abdul Majid Wani (INC)
13. Vikar Rasool Wani (INC)
14. Aga Syed Ruhullah Mehdi - Science and Technology and Animal Husbandry

With One female Cabinet minister (Sakina itoo), the Omar Abdullah ministry was the first government of Jammu and Kashmir to appoint female Cabinet minister.

== See also ==
- Second Omar Abdullah ministry
