= Fakim Wildlife Sanctuary =

Wildlife sanctuary in India

- IUCN category IV (habitat/species management area)
- Location within Nagaland Location within India
- Interactive map of Fakim Wildlife Sanctuary
- Location: Nagaland, India
- Nearest city: Kiphire
- Coordinates: 25.825528°N 94.954389°E
- Established: 1983; 43 years ago
- Governing body: Department of Forests, Environment, and Climate Change, Government of Nagaland

Fakim Wildlife Sanctuary is a protected area in Nagaland, India. It is situated close to the India-Myanmar border in Pungro circle of Kiphire district, and covers an area of 642 ha (1,590 acres). Fakim village is the gateway to the sanctuary. It was established in 1983.

== History ==
The Fakim Wildlife Sanctuary was established in 1983.

The state's Department of Forest, Environment, and Climate Change, manages the sanctuary along with other wildlife sanctuaries such as Ntangki National Park, Singphan Wildlife Sanctuary, Pulie Badze Wildlife Sanctuary, and Nagaland Zoological Park.

== Geography ==
The sanctuary is part of the Indo-Burma biodiversity hotspot. Its altitude ranges from 1700-3000m above sea level.

== Biology ==
The sanctuary has a rich biodiversity. The terrain consists of hills, high ridges, green meadows, deep gorges and narrow valleys. It is composed of thick virgin primary forest of wet temperate to sub-alpine types.

=== Flora ===
In 2017 a research noted 60 tree species, from 40 genera and 27 families. Amongst these, species from lauraceae and rosaceae families were the most dominant. The sanctuary is thick with oak, Khasi pine, hollock, nahor, kachnar, cane and bamboo. Cinnamomum zeylanicum and Lithocarpus pachyphyllus, Betula alnoides are some of the most abundant plants in the sanctuary.

Efforts are also underway for the conservation planting of Cephalotaxus mannii, native to the region.

=== Fauna ===
The sanctuary is home to slender loris, panthers, Himalayan bears, jungle cats, barking deers and hoolock gibbons. Chinese goral and leaf muntjaci are also found here. Sumatran rhino and tigers were once found here.

Bird species in the sanctuary include great hornbills, tragopans, junglefowls and doves. The state bird, Blyth's tragopan, also live here. It is estimated that the sanctuary has more tragopans than elsewhere in the state. Though rare, Mrs. Hume's pheasant, the state bird of Manipur and Mizoram, have been sighted here. Few instances of the scaly laughingthrush, Tibetan serin, and Alpine accentor have also been noted in and around the sanctuary. Other avian species include the bay woodpecker, and wedge-tailed green pigeon.

Several snake species are also found in the sanctuary. In 2010 Bella rat snake (Maculophis bella) was seen for the first time, expanding the previously known habitat from northern Myanmar to western Yunnan province in China.

== Climate ==
The sanctuary receives rainfall between 200 and 300cm every year. The temperature drops to 5°C in winters and can be as warm as 29°C in summers.

== Conservation efforts ==
Nagaland government has encouraged conservation initiatives including hunting bans. Campaigns by NGOs and activists are also key to the fledgling conservation efforts. Fakim village has resolved to keep additional 384 ha of community land for the ‘Fakim Village Tragopan Conservation Reserve.’

In 2019, Alemba Yimchunger, a forest guard at the sanctuary was recognised with Earth Day Network Star. He has worked for over 30 years in protecting the flora and fauna of the sanctuary. He joined the state's forest department as a camp guide. Previously in 2018 he also received a grant from Sanctuary Nature Foundation. Balipara Foundation, another NGO working in Northeast India, bestowed on him the Forest Rangers and Guards of The Eastern Himalayas Award.

== Recreation ==
Vongtsuwong village is a popular entry point into the sanctuary. The village has around 20 households and is located at an elevation of approximately 2000m. Fakim village is on the hill below the sanctuary and houses 70 families. Thanamir village is also adjacent to the sanctuary.

The nearest airport to Pungro is Dimapur Airport, approximately 320km away by road. As of 2024, the state government's helicopter service from Dimapur to Pungro is available once a week on Wednesdays. The flying time is 45 minutes, and the subsidised adult ticket costs ₹2925.
