= C. Kipili Sangtam =

Indian politician

C. Kipili Sangtam (born 1951) is an Indian politician from Nagaland. He is a four-time MLA from the Seyochung Sitimi Assembly constituency, which is reserved for Scheduled Tribe community, in Kiphire district. He won the 2023 Nagaland Legislative Assembly election, representing the National People's Party.

== Early life and education ==
Sangtam is from Seyochung, Kiphire District, Nagaland. He is the son of Chorise Sangtam. He studied Class 8 at the Government High School, Kiphire and passed the examination conducted by the Nagaland Board of School Education in 1974.

== Career ==
Sangtam first became an MLA winning the 2003 Nagaland Legislative Assembly election representing Nationalist Democratic Movement for the Seyochung Sitimi Assembly constituency. In 2003, he defeated his closest rival, S. Sethricho Sangtam of the Indian National Congress (INC), by a margin of 5536 votes. He retained the seat in the 2008 Nagaland Legislative Assembly election as an independent candidate.

Sangtam won the same seat for the third time on the Naga People's Front ticket in the 2013 Nagaland Legislative Assembly election. He polled 12507 votes which was 3399 more votes than his nearest rival, Tsasepi Sangtam of the INC. However, he lost to Kashiho Sangtam of the BJP, in the 2018 Nagaland Legislative Assembly election by a margin of 1162 votes. In 2023, the former minister won for a fourth term.

Sangtam won the Seyochung Sitimi Assembly constituency in the 2023 Nagaland Legislative Assembly election, representing the National People's Party. He polled 11,936 votes and defeated his nearest rival and sitting MLA, V. Kashiho Sangtam of the Bharatiya Janata Party, by a margin of 930 votes.
