= Chomi, India =

Chomi
- Location in Nagaland
- Coordinates: 25.855°N 94.827°E
- Country: India
- State: Nagaland
- District: Kiphire district

Population (2011)
  - Total: 2,718
- Time zone: UTC+5:30 (IST)

Chomi is a settlement in Kiphire district of Nagaland state of India.
