= Phelungre =

Phelungre is a village in Kiphire district of Nagaland state of India.
