= Anatongre =

Village in India

Anatongre is a village in Kiphire district of Nagaland state of India.
