= Zaonger =

- Location in Nagaland
- Coordinates: 25.856°N 94.881°E
- Country: India
- State: Nagaland
- District: Kiphire district

Population (2011)
  - Total: 1,025
- Time zone: UTC+5:30 (IST)

Zaonger is a settlement in Kiphire district of Nagaland state of India.
