= Langate Assembly constituency =

Constituency of the Jammu and Kashmir legislative assembly in India

Coordinates: 34.38°N 74.30°E

Langate
- Constituency No. 6 for the Jammu and Kashmir Legislative Assembly

Constituency details
- Country: India
- State: Jammu and Kashmir
- District: Kupwara
- Lok Sabha constituency: Baramulla
- Established: 1977
- Total electors: 1,20,211

Member of Legislative Assembly
- Incumbent Khursheed Ahmad Shiekh
- Party: Jammu and Kashmir Awami Ittehad Party
- Elected year: 2024

Langate Assembly constituency is one of the 90 constituencies in the Jammu and Kashmir Legislative Assembly of Jammu and Kashmir a north state of India. Langate is also part of Baramulla Lok Sabha constituency.

== Members of the Legislative Assembly ==
Election	Member	Party
1977	Mohammad Sultan Ganai	Jammu & Kashmir National Conference
1983	Abdul Ahad Wani	Jammu & Kashmir National Conference
1987	Abdul Ahad Wani	Jammu & Kashmir National Conference
1996	Abdul Ahad Wani	Jammu & Kashmir National Conference
1999 By-election	Mohammed Sultan Panditpuri	Independent politician
2002	Sharifuddin Shariq	Jammu & Kashmir National Conference
2008	Sheikh Abdul Rashid	Independent politician
2014	Sheikh Abdul Rashid	Independent politician
2024	Khursheed Ahmad Sheikh	Jammu and Kashmir Awami Ittehad Party

== Election results ==
=== Assembly Election 2024 ===
2024 Jammu and Kashmir Legislative Assembly election : Langate
Party	Candidate	Votes	%	±%
JKAIP	Khursheed Ahmad Shiekh	25,984	33.29%	New
JKPC	Irfan Sultan Panditpuri	24,382	31.23%	▲11.67
Independent	Junaid Jawaid Mir	9,125	11.69%	New
INC	Irshad Hussain Ganaie	7,823	10.02%	▲8.10
Independent	Kalimullah Lone	3,535	4.53%	New
JKAP	Mohammad Munawar Khawaja	1,154	1.48%	New
Independent	Mohammad Sultan Magray	876	1.12%	New
NOTA	None of the Above	1,104	1.41%	▲0.38
Margin of victory		1,602	2.05%	▼2.84
Turnout		78,062	64.94%	▼7.57
Registered electors		1,20,211		▲70.25
Independent hold		Swing	▼2.21	

=== Assembly Election 2014 ===
2014 Jammu and Kashmir Legislative Assembly election : Langate
Party	Candidate	Votes	%	±%
JKAIP	Sheikh Abdul Rashid	18,172	35.49%	New
JKPDP	Ghulam Nabi Ganai	15,667	30.60%	▲9.32
JKPC	Mohammed Abdullah Mir	10,015	19.56%	New
Independent	Irshad Hussain Ganaie	1,819	3.55%	New
JKNC	Wali Mohammed Bhat	1,645	3.21%	▼11.24
INC	Bashir Ahmad Wani	983	1.92%	▼7.68
Independent	Mohammed Akbar Ganie	632	1.23%	New
NOTA	None of the Above	532	1.04%	New
Margin of victory		2,505	4.89%	▲4.32
Turnout		51,196	72.51%	▲11.18
Registered electors		70,608		▲18.86
Independent hold		Swing	▲13.63	

=== Assembly Election 2008 ===
2008 Jammu and Kashmir Legislative Assembly election : Langate
Party	Candidate	Votes	%	±%
Independent	Sheikh Abdul Rashid	7,964	21.86%	New
JKPDP	Mohammed Sultan Panditpuri	7,754	21.29%	▲0.11
JKNC	Sharifuddin Shariq	5,266	14.46%	▼15.71
Independent	Mohammed Abdullah	4,188	11.50%	New
INC	Mohammed Amin Khan	3,497	9.60%	▼10.29
Independent	Abdul Ahad Wani	1,513	4.15%	New
JKPDF	Bashir Ahmad Wani	1,408	3.87%	New
Margin of victory		210	0.58%	▼8.41
Turnout		36,429	61.33%	▲7.35
Registered electors		59,403		▲20.00
Independent gain from JKNC		Swing	▼8.30	

=== Assembly Election 2002 ===
2002 Jammu and Kashmir Legislative Assembly election : Langate
Party	Candidate	Votes	%	±%
JKNC	Sharifuddin Shariq	8,058	30.16%	▲4.25
JKPDP	Mohammad Sultan Panditpuri	5,658	21.18%	New
INC	Mohammed Amin Khan	5,313	19.89%	▼1.92
Independent	Nazir Ahmad Lone	2,590	9.69%	New
Independent	Mohammed Assadullah Dar	1,368	5.12%	New
Independent	Mohammed Farooq Chichi	1,188	4.45%	New
Independent	Abdul Ahad Sheikh	1,018	3.81%	New
Margin of victory		2,400	8.98%	▲8.57
Turnout		26,717	53.97%	▲13.36
Registered electors		49,501		▲16.68
JKNC gain from Independent		Swing	▲3.83	

=== Assembly By-election 1999 ===
1999 Jammu and Kashmir Legislative Assembly by-election : Langate
Party	Candidate	Votes	%	±%
Independent	Mohammed Sultan Panditpuri	4,537	26.33%	New
JKNC	Bashir Ahmad Wani	4,465	25.91%	▼35.70
INC	Mohammed Amin	3,757	21.80%	▲3.54
Independent	Nazir Ahmad Lone	3,449	20.02%	New
BJP	Mohammed Maqbool Mir	769	4.46%	New
Independent	Mohammed Yousif Quereshi	255	1.48%	New
Margin of victory		72	0.42%	▼42.92
Turnout		17,232	40.62%	▲2.50
Registered electors		42,426		▲2.35
Independent gain from JKNC		Swing	▼35.28	

=== Assembly Election 1996 ===
1996 Jammu and Kashmir Legislative Assembly election : Langate
Party	Candidate	Votes	%	±%
JKNC	Abdul Ahad Wani	9,734	61.61%	▲22.04
INC	Ghulam Mohi-Ud-Din War	2,886	18.27%	New
JD	K. M. Ganaie	1,197	7.58%	New
JKNPP	Syed Mohammed Rafiq Shah	870	5.51%	▲4.17
Independent	Abdul Subhan Lone	796	5.04%	New
Independent	Manzoor Ahmad Shah	317	2.01%	New
Margin of victory		6,848	43.34%	▲38.51
Turnout		15,800	42.67%	▼39.20
Registered electors		41,451		▲18.78
JKNC hold		Swing	▲22.04	

=== Assembly Election 1987 ===
1987 Jammu and Kashmir Legislative Assembly election : Langate
Party	Candidate	Votes	%	±%
JKNC	Abdul Ahad Wani	10,676	39.57%	▼4.73
Independent	Ghulam Qadir Lone	9,371	34.73%	New
JKNC	Abdul Hamid	4,241	15.72%	▼28.58
Independent	Mohammed Sultan Panditpuri	2,010	7.45%	New
JKNPP	Syed Mohammed Sharief	361	1.34%	New
Independent	Ghulam Rasool Mochi	324	1.20%	New
Margin of victory		1,305	4.84%	▼20.71
Turnout		26,983	80.15%	▲4.47
Registered electors		34,897		▲2.80
JKNC hold		Swing	▼4.73	

=== Assembly Election 1983 ===
1983 Jammu and Kashmir Legislative Assembly election : Langate
Party	Candidate	Votes	%	±%
JKNC	Abdul Ahad Wani	10,954	44.29%	▼5.75
JKNC	Ghulam Nabi	4,637	18.75%	▼31.29
JI	Ghulam Qadir Lone	3,971	16.06%	▲3.61
INC	Ghulam Rasool Wani	3,591	14.52%	▲5.34
Independent	Shamus-Ud-Din	806	3.26%	New
Independent	Ghulam Mohammed Dar	404	1.63%	New
Independent	Ghulam Mohammed Dar	233	0.94%	New
Margin of victory		6,317	25.54%	▼9.22
Turnout		24,731	76.77%	▲1.71
Registered electors		33,947		▲0.90
JKNC hold		Swing	▼5.75	

=== Assembly Election 1977 ===
1977 Jammu and Kashmir Legislative Assembly election : Langate
Party	Candidate	Votes	%	±%
JKNC	Mohammad Sultan Ganai (Panditpuri)	11,976	50.04%	New
Independent	Abdul Gani Mir	3,657	15.28%	New
JI	Ghulam Rasool	2,978	12.44%	New
JP	Ghulam Nabi	2,448	10.23%	New
INC	Ghulam Rasool Wani	2,198	9.18%	New
Independent	Shamus-Ud-Din	677	2.83%	New
Margin of victory		8,319	34.76%	
Turnout		23,934	74.63%	
Registered electors		33,645		
JKNC win (new seat)				

== See also ==
- Langate
- Kupwara district
- List of constituencies of Jammu and Kashmir Legislative Assembly
