= Next Indian general election =

Future election for 19th Lok Sabha

- By May-June 2029

All TBD seats in the Lok Sabha TBD seats needed for a majority
- Opinion polls
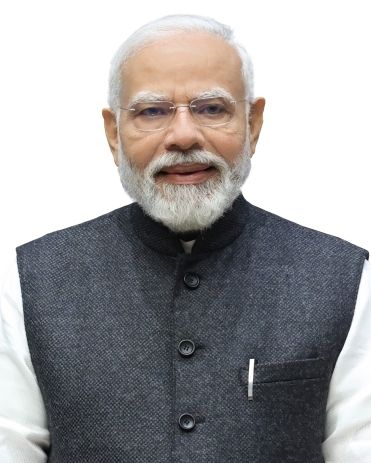

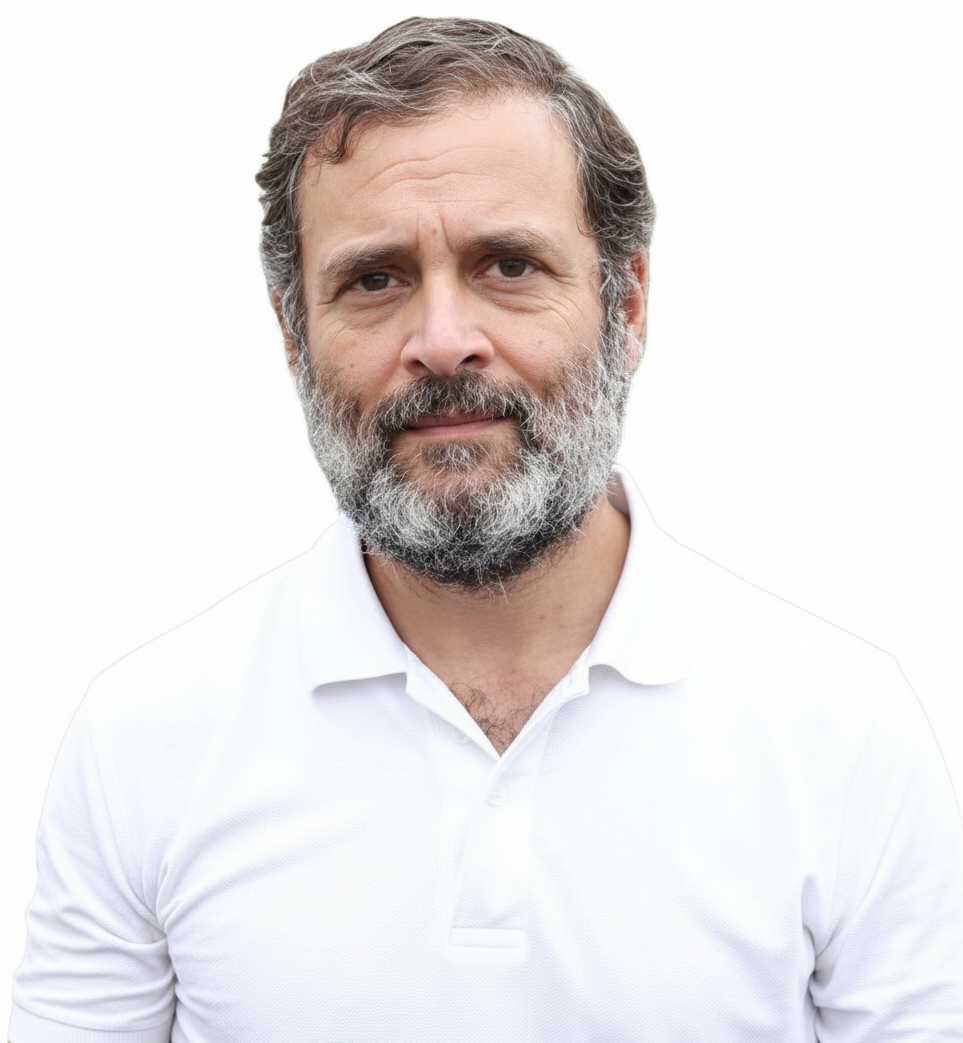
Leader	Narendra Modi	Rahul Gandhi
Party	BJP	INC
Alliance	NDA	INDIA
Leader's seat	Varanasi	Rae Bareli
Last election	36.56%, 240 seats	21.19%, 99 seats
Current seats	241	98
Seats needed	TBD	TBD
Current Alliance Seats	319	183
Alliance Seats Needed	TBD	TBD
Incumbent Prime Minister
Narendra Modi
BJP

General elections are expected to be held in India by May or June 2029 to elect members of the 19^{th} Lok Sabha, the lower house of Parliament.

== Background ==
The tenure of the 18th Lok Sabha is scheduled to end in June 2029. In the 2024 Indian general election, incumbent prime minister Narendra Modi ran for a third consecutive term with a coalition government. His Bharatiya Janata Party (BJP) had enjoyed an absolute majority—a minimum of 272 seats—in the 2014 and 2019 elections. The primary opposition was the Indian National Developmental Inclusive Alliance (INDIA), a coalition formed in 2023 by the Indian National Congress (INC) and many regional parties. The BJP won 240 seats, losing its majority in the Lok Sabha, with the NDA coalition securing 293 of the house's 543 seats. The INDIA coalition secured 234 seats, 99 of which were won by the Congress, garnering the party the official opposition status for the first time in 10 years. Seven independents and ten candidates from non-aligned parties also won seats in the Lok Sabha.

=== Current composition of the Lok Sabha ===
This table relates to the composition of the Lok Sabha after the 2024 Indian general election and summarises the changes in party affiliation that took place during the 2024–present Lok Sabha.

No. of Lok Sabha MP's party-wise:

As of 22 November 2026

Alliance	Party	No. of MPs	Leader of the Party
Government; NDA; Seats: 319	BJP	241	Narendra Modi (Leader of the House)
Government; NDA; Seats: 319	NCPI	20	Kakoli Ghosh Dastidar
Government; NDA; Seats: 319	TDP	16	Lavu Sri Krishna Devarayalu
Government; NDA; Seats: 319	SHS	13	Shrikant Shinde
Government; NDA; Seats: 319	JD(U)	12	Dileshwar Kamait
Government; NDA; Seats: 319	LJP(RV)	5	Chirag Paswan
Government; NDA; Seats: 319	JD(S)	2	M. Mallesh Babu
Government; NDA; Seats: 319	JSP	2	Vallabhaneni Balashowry
Government; NDA; Seats: 319	RLD	2	Rajkumar Sangwan
Government; NDA; Seats: 319	AD(S)	1	Anupriya Patel
Government; NDA; Seats: 319	AGP	1	Phani Bhusan Choudhury
Government; NDA; Seats: 319	AJSU	1	Chandra Prakash Choudhary
Government; NDA; Seats: 319	HAM(S)	1	Jitan Ram Manjhi
Government; NDA; Seats: 319	NCP	1	Sunil Tatkare
Government; NDA; Seats: 319	SKM	1	Indra Hang Subba
INDIA; Seats: 183	INC	98	Rahul Gandhi (Leader of the Opposition)
INDIA; Seats: 183	SP	37	Akhilesh Yadav
INDIA; Seats: 183	MAITC	8	Abhishek Banerjee
INDIA; Seats: 183	NCP-SP	8	Supriya Sule
INDIA; Seats: 183	CPI(M)	4	K. Radhakrishnan
INDIA; Seats: 183	RJD	4	Abhay Kumar Sinha
INDIA; Seats: 183	SS(UBT)	3	Arvind Sawant
INDIA; Seats: 183	IUML	3	E. T. Mohammed Basheer
INDIA; Seats: 183	JMM	3	Joba Majhi
INDIA; Seats: 183	CPI	2	K. Subbarayan
INDIA; Seats: 183	CPI(ML)L	2	Raja Ram Singh
INDIA; Seats: 183	JKNC	1	Mian Altaf Ahmed
INDIA; Seats: 183	VCK	2	Thol. Thirumavalavan
INDIA; Seats: 183	BAP	1	Rajkumar Roat
INDIA; Seats: 183	KEC	1	Francis George
INDIA; Seats: 183	MDMK	1	Durai Vaiko
INDIA; Seats: 183	RLP	1	Hanuman Beniwal
INDIA; Seats: 183	RSP	1	N. K. Premachandran
INDIA; Seats: 183	IND	3	Pappu Yadav; Mohmad Haneefa; Vishal Patil
Unaligned; Seats: 38	DMK	22	T. R. Baalu
Unaligned; Seats: 38	YSRCP	4	P. V. Midhun Reddy
Unaligned; Seats: 38	AAP	3	Gurmeet Singh Meet Hayer
Unaligned; Seats: 38	AD (WPD)	2	Sarabjeet Singh Khalsa
Unaligned; Seats: 38	AIMIM	1	Asaduddin Owaisi
Unaligned; Seats: 38	ASP(KR)	1	Chandrashekhar Azad
Unaligned; Seats: 38	SAD	1	Harsimrat Kaur Badal
Unaligned; Seats: 38	UPPL	1	Joyanta Basumatary
Unaligned; Seats: 38	ZPM	1	Richard Vanlalhmangaiha
Unaligned; Seats: 38	JKAIP	1	Sheikh Abdul Rashid
Unaligned; Seats: 38	IND	1	Umeshbhai Patel
Vacant		3	Basirhat; Shillong; Srinagar
Total		543	

=== Delimitation ===
The next Lok Sabha delimitation is due after the first census following the year 2026. According to the 84th amendment to the Constitution of India, the freeze on the delimitation of constituencies is set to continue until the results of the first census taken after the year 2026 are published. A special session of Parliament was convened from the 16th to the 18th of April 2026 to debate this matter. The 131st Constitutional Amendment Bill, 2026 was brought by the government to increase the total seats of the Lok Sabha to an upper limit of 850 seats and to make changes in Article 334A relating to the Lok Sabha's women's reservation; it was to be implemented in 2029 in time for the election. The delimitation bill was withdrawn by the government in the Lok Sabha after the 131st Constitutional Amendment Bill, 2026 failed in the Lok Sabha on 17 April 2026. Being a constitutional amendment, the bill needed two-thirds majority in both houses, but it garnered 298 votes in favour and 230 votes against.

=== Women's reservation ===
The introduction of the women's reservation in the Lok Sabha is set to occur after the delimitation based on the census following the year 2026. According to the 106th Amendment Act, 33% of the total seats will be directly allocated to women in the Lok Sabha and state legislative assemblies.

=== Schedule ===
Chief Election Commissioner Rajiv Kumar has indicated that the 2029 elections would be over by the end of April to prevent heat from affecting voter turnout. Until 2004, the general elections were conducted between the cooler months of December and March.

== Schedule ==
Poll event	Date
Notification	
Deadline for filing nomination	
Scrutiny of nominations	
Deadline for withdrawal of nomination	
Polling	
Counting of votes	

== Electoral system ==
MPs are elected from single-member constituencies using first-past-the-post voting. Eligible voters must be Indian citizens, 18 years or older, an ordinary resident of the polling area of the constituency and registered to vote (name included in the electoral rolls), possess a valid voter identification card issued by the Election Commission of India or equivalent. Some people convicted of electoral or other offences are barred from voting. Article 83 of the Constitution of India requires elections to the Lok Sabha be held once every five years.
