= Sheikh Abdul Rashid =

Indian politician (born 1967)

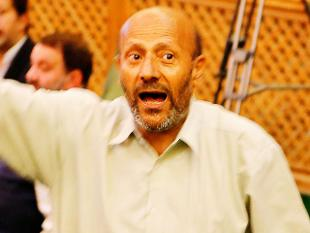
- Rashid speaking in the Jammu and Kashmir Legislative Assembly

Member of Parliament, Lok Sabha
- Incumbent
- Assumed office 4 June 2024
- Preceded by: Mohammad Akbar Lone
- Constituency: Baramulla

Member of the Jammu and Kashmir Legislative Assembly
- In office 25 December 2008 – 12 November 2018
- Preceded by: Sharifuddin Shariq
- Succeeded by: Khursheed Ahmad Shiekh
- Constituency: Langate

Personal details
- Born: Sheikh Abdul Rashid; 19 August 1967 (age 59) Mawar, Langate, Kupwara, Jammu and Kashmir, India
- Party: Jammu and Kashmir Awami Ittehad Party
- Education: Government Degree College, Sopore

Sheikh Abdul Rashid (born 19 August 1967), better known as Engineer Rashid, is an Indian politician, and currently member of Lok Sabha representing Baramulla constituency in Jammu and Kashmir, India. In September 2024, he was released on interim bail to campaign during the assembly elections.

Earlier he was a member of the Jammu and Kashmir Legislative Assembly, from the Langate constituency in Handwara. He is the founder and patron of the Jammu and Kashmir Awami Ittehad Party. He is famous for his speeches and is known as the Pain of Al-Baen (Plough) which is the symbol of National Conference.

== Early life ==
Rashid was born c. 1967 in his hometown Langate. He got involved with Kashmiri separatism as a teenager, and joined the Abdul Ghani Lone-led People's Conference in 1978. In 1987, the People's Conference was a leading member of the Muslim United Front which fought the 1987 election on an Islamist agenda. The election saw widespread rigging, and is mentioned as a prime factor in the rise of Kashmir insurgency two years later.

Rashid obtained a Bachelor of Science degree in 1988, and a diploma in civil engineering two years later. He worked for over a decade as an engineer in the state government-run Jammu and Kashmir Projects Construction Corporation.

== Political career ==
He won the Langate seat as an independent candidate in the 2008 Jammu and Kashmir Legislative Assembly election and retained it in the 2014 Jammu and Kashmir Legislative Assembly election. Rashid subsequently defeated former Chief Minister of Jammu & Kashmir Omar Abdullah in 2024 Lok Sabha election from Baramulla Lok Sabha constituency.

== Arrests ==
In the year 2005, Rashid was arrested by the SOG in Srinagar for supporting militants and subsequently jailed for three months and 17 days. He was charged with committing anti-national activities, and was kept in Cargo, Humhama and Raj bagh prisons. Later the Chief Judicial Magistrate of Srinagar dropped all charges against him on humanitarian grounds. According to Rashid he was arrested by a motley group of counter-insurgents that worked closely with the state police, who took him to an interrogation centre, where he was "interrogated." After five months of custody, he negotiated his release, paying ₹1.14 lakhs.

In August 2019, he was arrested under the Unlawful Activities (Prevention) Act (UAPA) on terror funding charges. He contested the 2024 parliamentary election from jail and won. However, he remained in jail, and had no opportunity to attend the parliament.

On 11 September 2024, he was granted interim bail until 2 October, allowing him to campaign for the 2024 Jammu and Kashmir Legislative Assembly election.

On 1 October 2024, his interim bail, which was earlier until 2 October was further extended by Patiala house court, Delhi until 12 October 2024, allowing him to witness the results of the 2024 Jammu and Kashmir Legislative Assembly election . His bail was again extended till 28 October 2024 and after the interim bail expired he was sent back to jail.

== Attacks ==
On 8 October 2015 Engineer Rashid was assaulted by BJP MLAs inside the Jammu and Kashmir Legislative Assembly for hosting a party where he served beef on the lawns of the government circuit with a view to oppose the controversial central Government order banning the consumption of beef in India.

He was also attacked with black ink in Press Club New Delhi by BJP cadets a day after his critical comments regarding the lynching of a Truck driver in Udhampur.
