= Opinion polling for the next Indian general election =

Next Indian general election

In the run-up to the next Indian general election, which is expected to be held by May or June 2029 to elect members of the 19th Lok Sabha, various media houses and polling agencies are carrying out opinion polls to gauge voting intentions. Results of such polls are displayed in this list.

Seats by constituency. As this is a FPTP election, seat totals are not determined proportional to each party's total vote share, but instead by the plurality in each constituency

== Seats and vote share projections ==
Vote share projections
Polling agency	Date published	Sample size	Margin of error				Lead
Polling agency	Date published	Sample size	Margin of error	NDA	INDIA	Others	Lead
India Today-CVoter	August 2026	116,979	±5%	45.1	39.1	15.8	6
India Today-CVoter	January 2026	125,979	±5%	47	39	14	8
India Today-CVoter	August 2025	206,826	±3–5%	47	41	12	6
India Today-CVoter	January 2025	125,123	±3–5%	47	41	12	6
India Today-CVoter	August 2024	136,463	±3–5%	44	40	16	4
2024 election results				42.5%	40.6%	16.91%	1.9%

== Preferred candidate for prime minister ==
Polling Agency	Date published			
Polling Agency	Date published	Narendra Modi	Rahul Gandhi	Others/None/Can't say
India Today-CVoter	August 2026	48.7%	27.1%	24.2%
India Today-CVoter	January 2026	55%	27%	18%
India Today-CVoter	August 2025	52%	25%	23%
India Today-CVoter	January 2025	51%	25%	24%
India Today-CVoter	August 2024	49%	22.4%	28.6%
The Hindu CSDS-Lokniti	June 2024	41%	27%	32%

== By state/union territory ==
=== Maharashtra ===
Seat projections
Polling agency	Date published	Margin of error				Lead
Polling agency	Date published	Margin of error	NDA	INDIA	Others	Lead
India Today-CVoter	August 2026	±5%	31	17	0	14
India Today-CVoter	January 2026	±5%	33	15	0	18
2024 election results			17	30	1	13

Vote share projections
Polling agency	Date published	Margin of error				Lead
Polling agency	Date published	Margin of error	NDA	INDIA	Others	Lead
India Today-CVoter	August 2026	±5%	49	43	8	6
India Today-CVoter	January 2026	±5%	49	40	11	9
2024 election results			44%	44%	12%	0%

=== Punjab ===
Seat projections
Polling agency	Date published	Margin of error				Lead
Polling agency	Date published	Margin of error	NDA	INDIA	Others	Lead
India Today-CVoter	August 2026	±5%	1	11	1	10
India Today-CVoter	January 2026	±5%	2	10	1	8
2024 election results			0	10	3	7

Vote share projections
Polling agency	Date published	Margin of error				Lead
Polling agency	Date published	Margin of error	NDA	INDIA	Others	Lead
India Today-CVoter	August 2026	±5%	16	25	59	34
India Today-CVoter	January 2026	±5%	23	29	48	19
2024 election results			19%	52%	29%	33%

=== Uttar Pradesh ===
Seat projections
Polling agency	Date published	Margin of error				Lead
Polling agency	Date published	Margin of error	NDA	INDIA	Others	Lead
India Today-CVoter	August 2026	±5%	38	41	1	3
India Today-CVoter	January 2026	±5%	48	31	1	17
2024 election results			36	43	1	7

Vote share projections
Polling agency	Date published	Margin of error				Lead
Polling agency	Date published	Margin of error	NDA	INDIA	Others	Lead
India Today-CVoter	August 2026	±5%	42	40	18	2
India Today-CVoter	January 2026	±5%	47	42	11	5
2024 election results			44%	44%	12%	0%

=== West Bengal ===
Seat projections
Polling agency	Date published	Margin of error				Lead
Polling agency	Date published	Margin of error	NDA	INDIA	Others	Lead
India Today-CVoter	August 2026	±5%	35	7	0	28
India Today-CVoter	January 2026	±5%	14	28	0	14
2024 election results			12	30	0	18

Vote share projections
Polling agency	Date published	Margin of error				Lead
Polling agency	Date published	Margin of error	NDA	INDIA	Others	Lead
India Today-CVoter	August 2026	±5%	46	11	43	3
India Today-CVoter	January 2026	±5%	42	9	49	7
2024 election results			39%	10%	42%	3%
