= Kiphire =

- Town
- Location in Nagaland
- Coordinates: 25.888°N 94.785°E
- Country: India
- State: Nagaland
- District: Kiphire District

Government
  - Type: Town Council

Area
  - Total: 9 km^{2} (3.5 sq mi)
- Elevation: 896 m (2,940 ft)

Population (2011)
  - Total: 11,799
  - Rank: 17th in Nagaland
  - Density: 100/km^{2} (260/sq mi)

Languages
  - Official: English
- Time zone: UTC+5:30 (IST)
- Vehicle registration: NL
- Website: https://kiphire.nic.in

Kiphire (Pron:/ˈkɪfɑɪə/) is a town and the administrative seat of the Kiphire District in the Indian state of Nagaland. It is situated at an elevation of 896 m (2,940 ft) above sea level.

== Villages ==
- Singrep
- Tetheyo
