= Sharifuddin Shariq =

Indian politician

- شریفالدین شارق

Member of Lok Sabha
- In office 2009 – 16 May 2014
- Constituency: Baramulla

Member of Rajya Sabha
- In office 1980 - 1985
- Constituency: Jammu and Kashmir
- In office 1996 - 2002
- In office 1987 - 1990

Member of Jammu and Kashmir Legislative Assembly
- In office 2002-2008

Personal details
- Born: 13 March 1935 (age 91) Handwara, Kupwara district, Jammu and Kashmir, British Raj
- Party: Jammu & Kashmir National Conference
- Spouse: Sarwar Begum
- Children: 1 son & 4 daughters

Sharifuddin Shariq (Urdu: شریفالدین شارق; born 13 March 1935) is an Indian politician and member of Jammu & Kashmir National Conference. He is a former member of 15th Lok Sabha from Baramulla.

== Personal life ==
Sharifuddin Shariq was born on 13 March 1935 in Handwara, Kupwara district, Jammu and Kashmir to M. Abdul Gani and Sahiba Begum. He is married to Sarwar Begum.

== Electoral performance ==
=== Legislative Assembly ===
Election	Constituency	Party	Result	Votes %	Opposition Candidate	Opposition Party	Opposition vote %	Ref
2008	Langate	JKNC	Lost	14.46%	Abdul Rashid Sheikh	Independent	21.86%	
2002	Langate	JKNC	Won	30.16%	M. Sultan Pandithpori	JKPDP	21.18%	
1987	Karnah	JKNC	Won	50.88%	Abdul Rashid Mirchl	JKNC	37.26%	

=== Rajya Sabha ===
Position	Party	Constituency	From	To	Tenure
Member of Parliament, Rajya Sabha (1st Term)	JKNC	Jammu and Kashmir	2 April 1980	10 November 1984	4 years, 222 days
Member of Parliament, Rajya Sabha (2nd Term)	JKNC	Jammu and Kashmir	30 November 1996	26 October 2002	5 years, 330 days
