= Jammu and Kashmir Awami Ittehad Party =

Political party in India

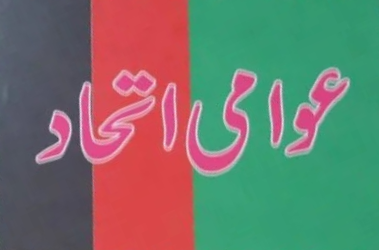
- Abbreviation: AIP
- President: Engineer Rashid
- Chairperson: Mohammad Yousuf Bhat
- Founder: Engineer Rashid
- Founded: 12 June 2013; 13 years ago
- Headquarters: Srinagar, Jammu and Kashmir
- Youth wing: AIP Youth Wing
- Ideology: Kashmiriyat
- ECI status: Unrecognised
- Seats in Rajya Sabha: 0 / 245
- Seats in Lok Sabha: 1 / 543
- Seats in Jammu and Kashmir Legislative Assembly: 1 / 90
- Seats in District Development Council: 3 / 280

Party flag

Website
- www.awamiithadpartyjk.com

Jammu and Kashmir Awami Ittehad Party (abbr. JKAIP) is an Indian political party in the Indian Union Territory of Jammu and Kashmir. Founded in 2013 by Engineer Rashid, the party has been active in local politics, including the 2024 Jammu and Kashmir Legislative Assembly election.

While the Jammu and Kashmir Awami Ittehad Party presents itself as an alternative to traditional political forces in the region, some political commentators have speculated that it may have ties to or be indirectly sponsored by the Bharatiya Janata Party (BJP), possibly acting as a proxy. However, the party leadership has consistently denied these claims, asserting its independence and focus on regional issues.

== History ==
=== Foundation ===
The Awami Ittehad Party (AIP) was founded in 2013 by Sheikh Abdul Rashid, commonly referred to as Engineer Rashid, who had previously been an independent member of the Legislative Assembly of Jammu and Kashmir representing the Langate constituency. Rashid had gained prominence for his views on the Kashmir conflict and his advocacy for peaceful resolutions to the region's political disputes. AIP was established as an alternative to both the mainstream political parties in Jammu and Kashmir, such as the National Conference (NC) and the People's Democratic Party (PDP), as well as separatist factions.

==== Ideology ====
AIP's core ideology revolves around the right to self-determination for the people of Jammu and Kashmir, as outlined in United Nations resolutions. The party calls for a plebiscite to allow the people of the region to decide their future, either with India or Pakistan or as an independent state. In addition, AIP advocates for demilitarization, the removal of laws like the Armed Forces Special Powers Act (AFSPA), and an end to human rights abuses by security forces in the region. AIP also focuses on improving socio-economic conditions for Kashmiris, addressing unemployment, and ensuring political rights for the people of the region.

== Political activities ==
=== 2014 Jammu and Kashmir Legislative Assembly Election ===
The party contested the 2014 Jammu and Kashmir Legislative Assembly elections on multiple seats, with its founder, Engineer Rashid, retaining his seat in Langate. Despite not winning additional seats, AIP emerged as a vocal force within the state legislature. During the 2024 assembly elections, they reportedly advocated for the unconditional release of political prisoners and a ban on liquor sales as part of their manifesto.

=== 2024 Baramulla Lok Sabha election ===
In the 2024 Indian general elections, AIP's leader, Engineer Rashid, contested the Baramulla parliamentary seat from prison. Rashid had been in detention under the Public Safety Act (PSA) and was later arrested by the National Investigation Agency (NIA) in 2019 on charges related to terror funding. Despite his ongoing legal troubles and his inability to actively campaign, Rashid achieved victory, securing the seat with high margin.

=== Role in the Gupkar Declaration ===
In October 2020, AIP became part of the People's Alliance for Gupkar Declaration (PAGD), a coalition aimed at restoring the special status of Jammu and Kashmir, which had been revoked following the abrogation of Article 370. This alliance opposes the bifurcation of Jammu and Kashmir into two Union Territories and seeks to restore its autonomy.

=== Coalition in 2024 assembly polls ===
In a political development, the Awami Ittehad Party (AIP) led by Engineer Rashid has formed an alliance with former members of the Jamaat-e-Islami for the 2024 Jammu and Kashmir Legislative Assembly election, with the party winning from Langate.

== See also ==
- Engineer Rashid
- Kashmir conflict
- Article 370 of the Constitution of India
- People's Alliance for Gupkar Declaration
- Jammu and Kashmir Legislative Assembly elections
- Jammu and Kashmir (union territory)
