= Unisoo, Langate =

Pohrupeth Handwara
- Village Langate
- Langate

Handwara transcription(s)
- Location in Jammu and Kashmir, India
- Coordinates: 34.3791°N 74.3723°E
- Country: India
- Union Territory: Jammu and Kashmir
- District: Kupwara
- Division: Handwara
- Elevation: 1,950 m (6,400 ft)

Population (2011)
  - Total: 1,360
- Time zone: UTC+5:30 (IST)
- Postal code: 193302

Unisoo is a notified area and a village in Langate Tehsil of the Kupwara District of Jammu and Kashmir, India. It is located 20 kilometres (12 mi) South from the district headquarters of Kupwara and 66 kilometres (41 mi) from the summer capital of the union territory, Srinagar. Unisoo, has a Primary Health Centre. The J & K bank has an ATM in the village.
