= Singrep =

Coordinates: 25.9188°N 94.7670°E

Singrep is a village in Kiphire district of Nagaland state of India.
