= Singphan Wildlife Sanctuary =

Wildlife sanctuary in Mon district, Nagaland, India

- IUCN category IV (habitat/species management area)
- Location within Nagaland Location within India
- Interactive map of Singphan Wildlife Sanctuary
- Location: Mon district, Nagaland, India
- Coordinates: 26.925°N 94.894306°E
- Area: 23.57 km^{2} (9.10 sq mi)
- Established: 2009
- Governing body: Nagaland Forest Department

Singphan Wildlife Sanctuary is a wildlife sanctuary in the Mon district in the Indian state of Nagaland. The sanctuary covers an area of approximately 23.57 km² (2,357 hectares) and was notified as a wildlife sanctuary in 2009. The area lies along the border with Assam and forms part of a contiguous forest tract important for elephant movement in the region. In 2018, it was declared as an elephant reserve.

== Biodiversity ==
The sanctuary has a tropical wet evergreen and moist deciduous forest types, with bamboo brakes and secondary forests reported in the protected area. It hosts over 180 plant species. Faunal reports and state documentation indicate presence of Asian elephant (Elephas maximus), and jackals; the sanctuary is part of a landscape that facilitates seasonal movement of elephants between Nagaland and adjacent Assam reserve forests.

== Conservation and management ==
The sanctuary is administered by the Nagaland Forest Department. As part of elephant conservation planning under Project Elephant, the State Government (with central approval) notified the area as the Singphan Elephant Reserve in 2018. Management activities focus on habitat protection, monitoring of elephant movement and community engagement in fringe villages. It is the smallest Elephant Reserve in the country.

== Threats ==
Documented threats to the sanctuary and surrounding landscape include habitat disturbance from local resource use, road networks that increase access and edge effects, tree felling, grazing pressure in fringe areas, and potential land-use change in adjoining reserve forests. Research in the sanctuary has highlighted disturbance impacts on forest community structure and regeneration. Conservation management emphasises reducing anthropogenic pressure, improving habitat connectivity, and mitigation of human–elephant conflict in adjacent communities.

== See also ==
- Fakim Wildlife Sanctuary
- Aoleang
- Rangapahar Wildlife Sanctuary
