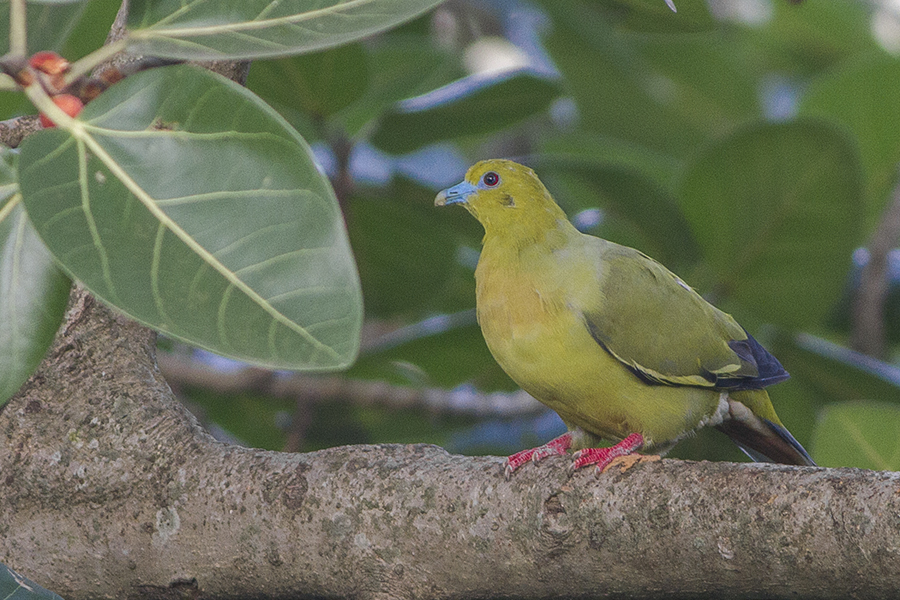
- Species Treron apicauda apicauda from Ghatgarh village of Nainital district of Uttarakhand, India

Conservation status
- Least Concern (IUCN 3.1)

Scientific classification
- Kingdom: Animalia
- Phylum: Chordata
- Class: Aves
- Order: Columbiformes
- Family: Columbidae
- Genus: Treron
- Species: T. apicauda

Binomial name
- Treron apicauda Blyth, 1846

= Pin-tailed green pigeon =

Species of bird

The pin-tailed green pigeon or pin-tailed pigeon (Treron apicauda) is a species of bird in the family Columbidae native to Southeast Asia. It has also been referred to by the former names Columba longicauda, Vinago apicauda, and Sphenocerus apicaudus in earlier ornithological literature.

== Description ==
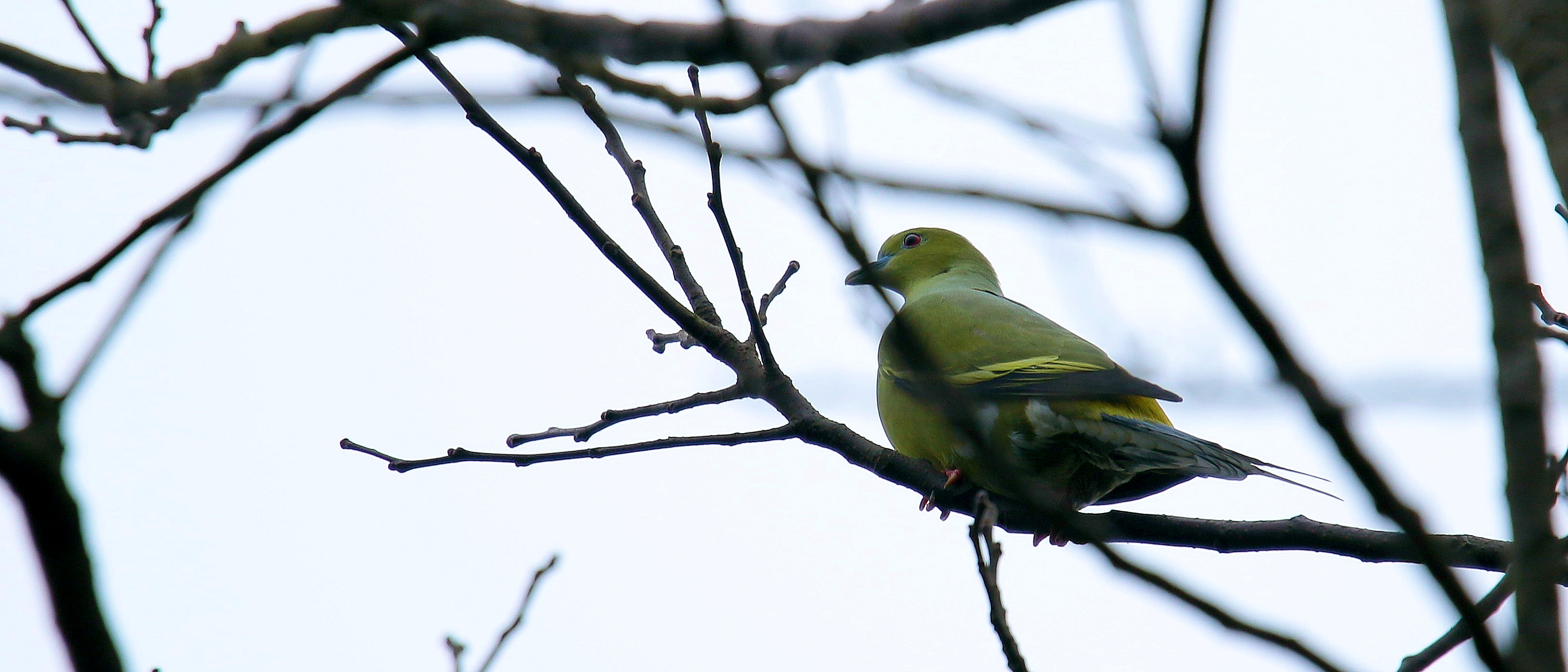
Pin-tailed green pigeon

The pin-tailed green pigeon is a medium-sized dove, with an average weight of 185-255 grams. Males are 32-36 cm and females are typically 28 cm. It is yellow-green overall, with darker green wing-coverts and scapulars and black outer secondaries and primaries. The males have a golden breast with pinkish hues. The central tail feathers are a bluish-grey and the undertail-coverts a chestnut colour. The orbital ring is blue, as is the bill, with a lighter green or yellow tip. The legs and feet are a bright reddish-pink. The females are a duller yellow, with much shorter central tail feathers and dull undertail-coverts.

The song is described as a soft whistling ku-koo, which is usually paired. The pin-tailed green pigeon also lets out a high pitched doo! call. While in flight, feathers produce a whirring sound.

== Distribution and habitat ==
The pin-tailed green pigeon is found in Bangladesh, Bhutan, Cambodia, China, India, Laos, Myanmar, Nepal, Thailand, and Vietnam. It inhabits secondary growth and forest, including foothill forests, subtropical and tropical dry forest, and evergreen rainforest. It typically inhabits areas 0 to 1800 metres altitude.

Pin-tailed green pigeons are resident birds in some parts of their range, and nomadic in other parts in response to food resources. In central Vietnam, they will descend to lower elevations during the dry season, which is when many trees are fruiting.

== Behaviour and ecology ==
=== Diet ===
The pin-tailed green pigeon is frugivorous, feeding mainly on fruit and berries in an acrobatic fashion. The species is gregarious, forming feeding flocks varying from 10-30 birds. Flocks have been observed descending to the ground to visit salt licks.

=== Breeding ===
Nesting has been observed in April, May, and June in the Himalayan foothills. In other parts of Southeast Asia, pin-tailed green pigeons have been observed breeding year round. The female lays two white eggs in a platformed twig nest, usually 5-6 metres off the ground. Nests have been observed in bamboo thickets, trees, and shrubs. Both parents incubate and feed the young. Individuals have a generational length of approximately 4.2 years.

== Taxonomy and systematics ==
The species' generic name comes from the Greek trērōn (timid, shy dove), while the specific epithet apicauda is derived from a combination of the Latin apicis (apex or point) and the Latin cauda (tail). The pin-tailed green pigeon was placed in the genus Sphenerus in the past.

=== Subspecies ===
Three subspecies are recognised:

- Treron apicauda apicauda Blyth, E, 1846. Found in Bangladesh, Bhutan, southwestern China, northern India (foothills of the Himalaya), Myanmar, and Nepal.
- Treron apicauda laotianus (Delacour, JT, 1926) Previously misspelt laotinus. Found in the mountains of Laos and northern Vietnam.
- Treron apicauda lowei (Delacour, JT; Jabouille, P, 1924) Found in the mountains of Thailand, central Laos, and central Vietnam.

== Description to western science ==
The first formal description of the pin-tailed green pigeon credits Edward Blyth with its identification in 1846. Blyth included the bird when he mentioned it in his paper "Drafts for a Fauna Indica. No. 1. The Columbidae, or Pigeons and Doves", published in the Journal of the Asiatic Society of Bengal, volume 14, part 2, on page 854.

However, the history of its first documentation is considerably earlier. The earliest surviving evidence that can be verified is from John McClelland's Assam collection of 1836. The British Library preserves two watercolours of the species, NHD6/931 and NHD6/932, both dated 1836. NHD6/931 was originally labeled Columba longicauda mihi and later received the annotation Treron apicauda Hodg., while NHD6/932 is annotated Treron apicauda Hodg., and bears the specific notation "Assam Collection. 16 Sept 1836 McClelland. Prestd. Aug. 1856". This establishes that the bird was being documented in McClelland's material in 1836, although the original name attached to the first drawing was Columba longicauda, not Treron apicauda.

A detailed study of the McClelland collection by ornithological historian Edward C. Dickinson confirms that McClelland brought back specimens and drawings from his 1835-1836 Assam survey and that his collection was substantially underreported in the published account of the expedition. Dickinson specifically identifies the NHD6/931 drawing as Treron apicauda and argues that, had Thomas Horsfield examined this portion of McClelland's collection before preparing his 1840 account, he would probably have recognised the bird as a new species.

The species was also associated with Brian Houghton Hodgson, a British naturalist who had collected it in Nepal recorded the species under the name apicauda in his manuscript. The historical British Museum catalogue records Vinago apicauda, Hodgs. MS in 1844 and then Treron apicauda, which was curated by G.R. Gray. Multiple independent sources had identified the bird as a new species prior to Blyth.

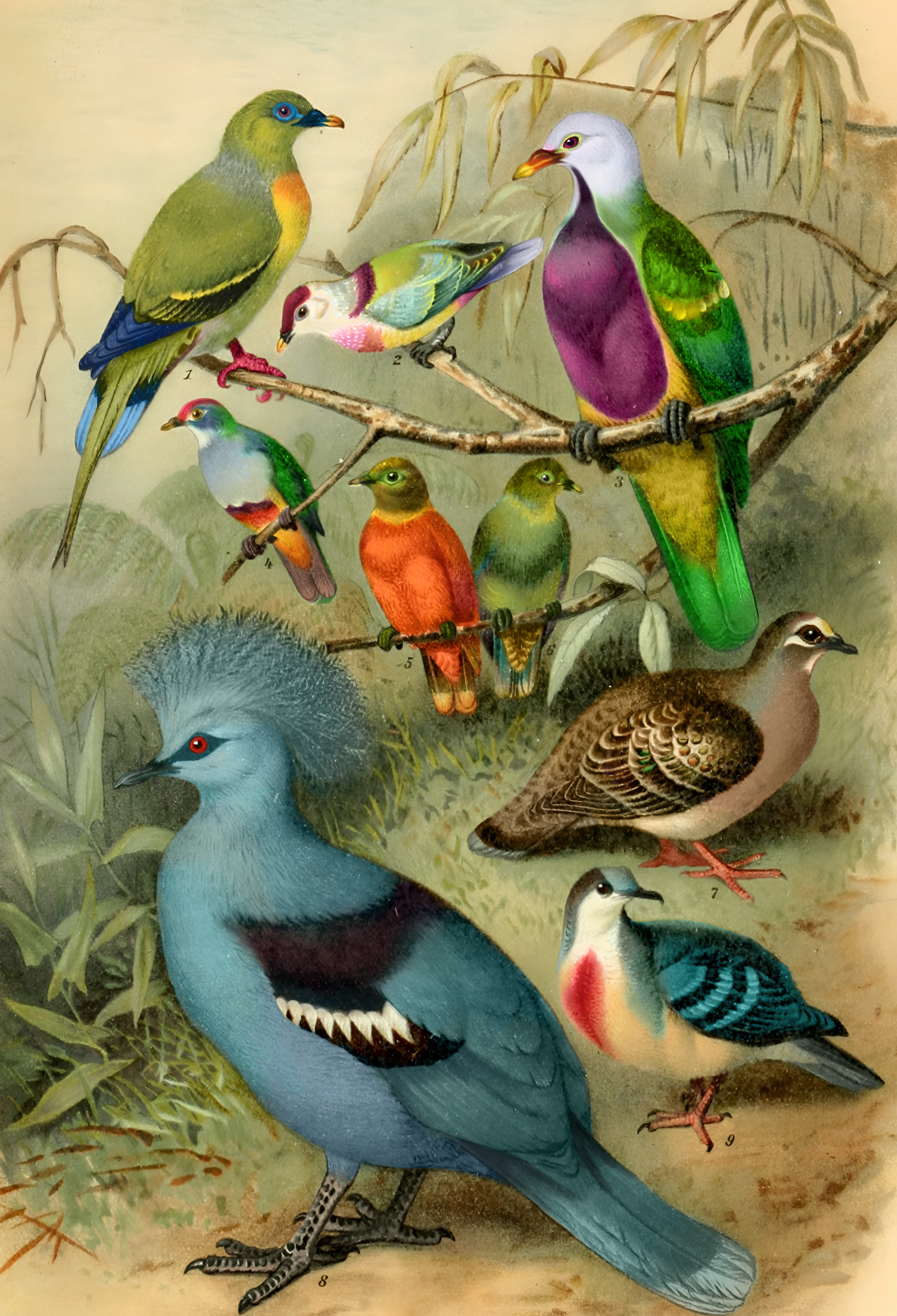
Treron apicauda (listed as Sphenocercus apicaudus) featured as No. 1 in a chromolithograph plate of "Tauben" from the 1898 edition of Brockhaus's Conversation Lexicon.

However, while McClelland and Hodgson had recorded the species before Blyth did, they did not formally establish the species in zoological nomenclature. Blyth's official description of the pin-tailed green pigeon ascribed it the name Treron apicauda in the paper he published on the pigeons and doves native to the Indian subcontinent. The later name Sphenocerus apicaudus was introduced by Charles Lucien Bonaparte in 1854, several years after Blyth's description.

== Indigenous names and traditional uses ==
Like many birds that Western scientists described during the colonial era, the pin-tailed green pigeon was known to the people living within its range long before European naturalists formally described it.

In Assam, historical ornithological literature records several local names for the species. E. C. Stuart Baker's 1913 publication on Indian Pigeons and Doves gives several local names for the bird: "Sang-pong" in the Lepcha language, "Daorep-galou" in the Kachari language, "Lumba-dum Kohhlu" in Hindi, "Bor Haitha" in Assamese, "Harial" in the language spoken by the people of the Terai region at the time, and "Ngu" in Burmese.

Baker also cautioned that the names used for the pin-tailed green pigeon often overlapped with those used for the yellow-footed green pigeon and wedge-tailed green pigeon, with an adjective sometimes added to distinguish the pin-tailed green pigeon because of its unusually long tail.

However, the Lepcha name "Sang-pong" is also recorded specifically for Treron apicauda in a modern compilation of Lepcha bird names, which distinguishes it from the wedge-tailed green pigeon, which is called "Kuhu". Additionally, more recent field research records the Assamese name for pigeon as "Dighol nejia haitha", while the same study gives "Bor haitha" for the closely related thick-billed green pigeon, showing that Assamese names indeed distinguished between different green-pigeon species. In Nepal, the bird is known as "Suiropuchhre Haleso", a Nepali name recorded for Treron apicauda in the National Red List of Nepal's Birds.

The pin-tailed green pigeon was also part of traditional hunting practices in parts of its range.

A 2025 study of the Nocte people of Arunachal Pradesh recorded Treron apicauda as the most frequently hunted bird in its survey. Researchers recorded 1,074 pin-tailed green pigeons taken during the study, and found that most of the birds were used for household consumption or shared with relatives, rather than sold.

Other ethnobiological research has also recorded Treron apicauda as a bird hunted for food, showing that the species has been part of traditional food practices in communities (especially the War Khasi peoples of Meghalaya) within its range.

== Cultural significance ==
Though there has been no known archaeological evidence of its use in ancient times or archaeological depictions of Treron apicauda specifically, there are several important archaeological references to birds and doves in ancient and early medieval Assam. An excavated sculpture discussed in a 2023 archaeological study by Y. S. Sanathana and Manjil Hazarika is interpreted by the archaeologists as a pigeon or dove. This sculpture, known as the Da-Parbatiya dove, is referenced in Sanathana and Hazarika's archaeological study, Fauna in the Sculptural Art of Early Medieval Assam, which examines the animal imagery associated with the Pragjyotisha-Kamarupa kingdom. This culture flourished in the Brahmaputra Valley from approximately the 3rd through 12th centuries CE.

At the Da-Parbatiya temple ruins at Tezpur, the researchers identified a statue of a small bird, described as "likely to be a depiction of a dove", carved beneath a depiction of the god Kartikeya. The archaeologists suggest that the carved bird may be connected to the story in the Shiva Purana in which the god Agni takes the form of a pigeon or dove and carries the god Shiva's reproductive material to the six Krittika goddesses, contributing to the birth of Kartikeya.

However, the bird carved at the temple of Da-Parbatiya cannot be identified as the pin-tailed green pigeon specifically.

== Conservation status ==
The pin-tailed green pigeon was assessed by the IUCN in 2018 and was listed as a species of least concern, though the population trend is decreasing. The species is thought to be common across much of its range, though sightings are limited. It is scarce in Thailand, and reported as very rare in Bangladesh.

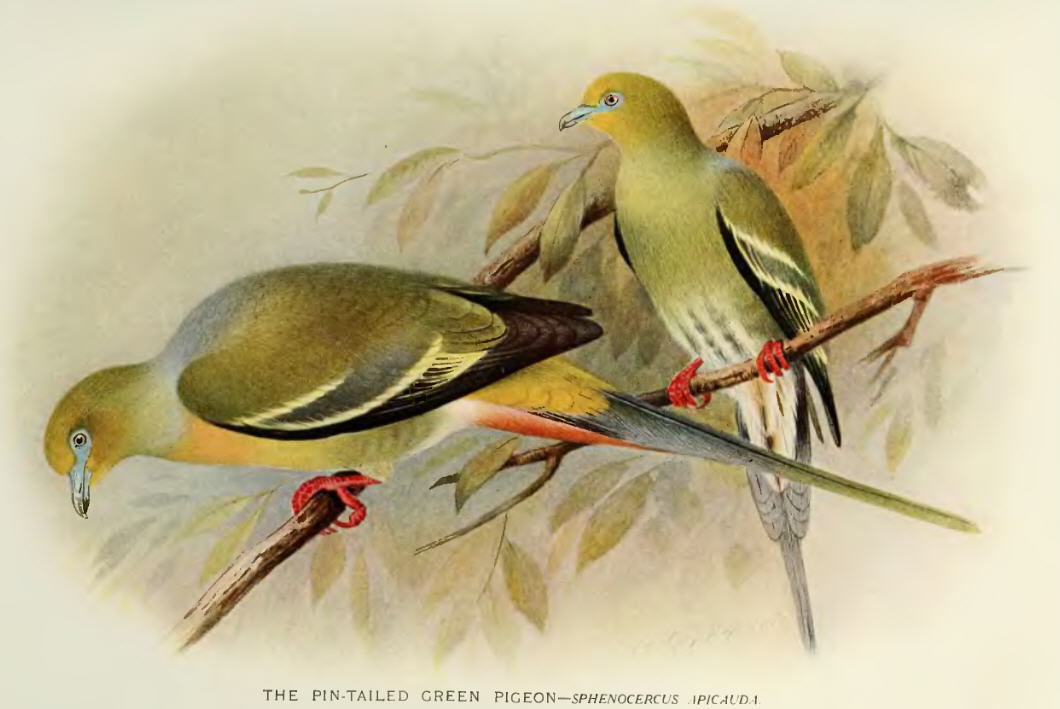
Artist's illustration
