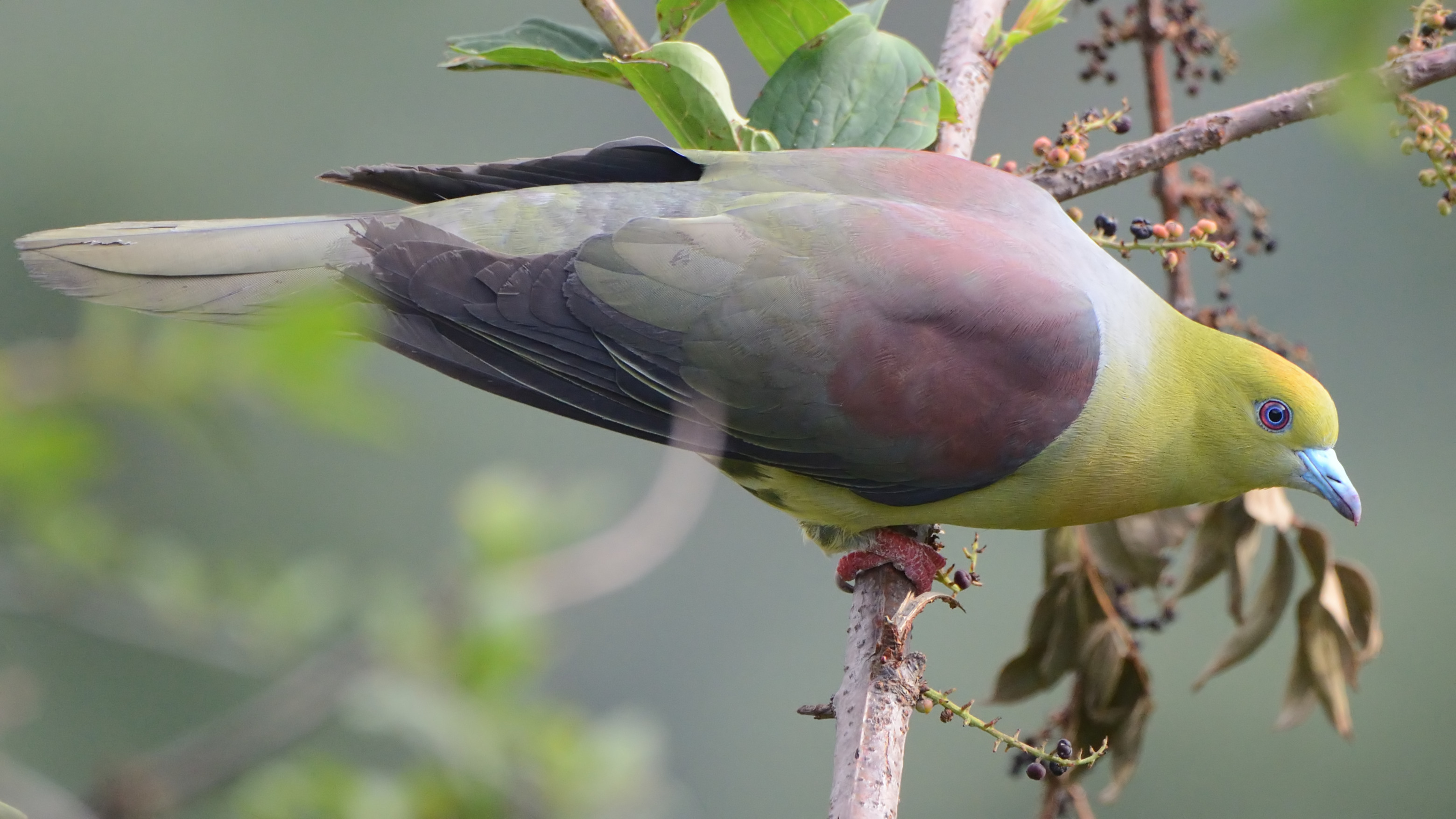
- Male at Dhanaulti, India
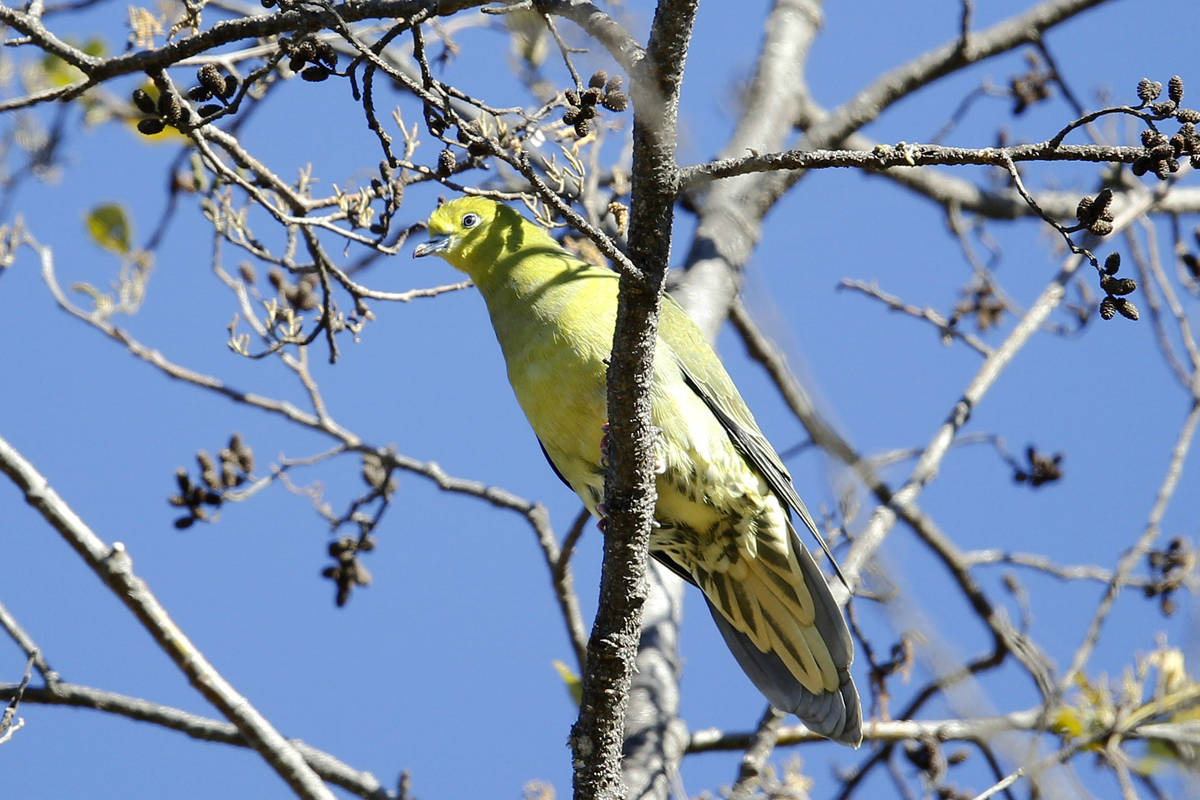
- Female in Myanmar

Conservation status
- Least Concern (IUCN 3.1)

Scientific classification
- Kingdom: Animalia
- Phylum: Chordata
- Class: Aves
- Order: Columbiformes
- Family: Columbidae
- Genus: Treron
- Species: T. sphenurus

Binomial name
- Treron sphenurus (Vigors, 1832)

Synonyms
- Treron sphenura (Vigors, 1832)

= Wedge-tailed green pigeon =

Species of bird

The wedge-tailed green pigeon or Kokla green pigeon (Treron sphenurus) is a species of bird in the family Columbidae.

== Description ==
It is greenish yellow with a wedge shaped tail. The crown is tinged with orange-rufous with a variable amount of maroon on the back and scapular feathers in males. This is absent in females due to the wedge-tailed green pigeon's sexually dimorphic plumage, typical of green pigeons.

It is found in the Indian subcontinent and Southeast Asia. It ranges across Bangladesh, Bhutan, Cambodia, India, Indonesia, Laos, Malaysia, Myanmar, Nepal, Thailand, Tibet and Vietnam.

Its natural habitats are subtropical or tropical moist lowland forest and subtropical or tropical moist montane forest.

== Taxonomy ==
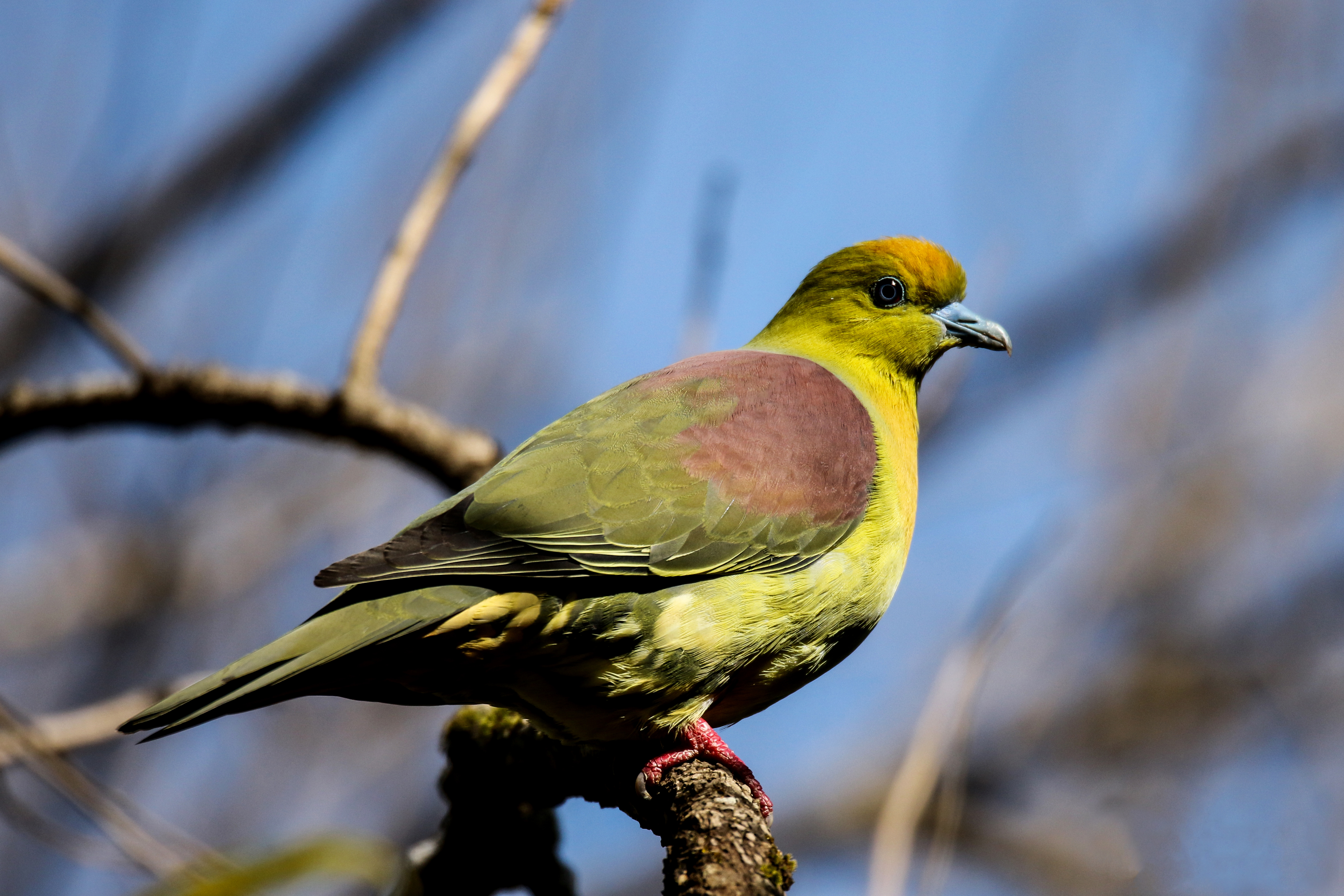
T. s. sphenurus in Nepal

Five subspecies are accepted:

- Treron sphenurus sphenurus (Vigors, NA, 1832) — mountains of Kashmir and along the Himalaya to southwestern China, Myanmar, northern Thailand, and Laos
- Treron sphenurus delacouri Biswas, B, 1950 — mountains of central Vietnam
- Treron sphenurus robinsoni (Ogilvie-Grant, WR, 1906) — mountains of the Malayan Peninsula
- Treron sphenurus etorques (Salvadori, AT, 1879) — mountains of Sumatra
- Treron sphenurus korthalsi (Bonaparte, CLJL, 1855) — Java, Bali, and Lombok

== Indigenous names and traditional uses ==
Like many birds that Western scientists described during the colonial era, the wedge-tailed green pigeon was known to the people living within its range long before European naturalists formally described it. In Assam, historical ornithological literature records several local names for the species. E. C. Stuart Baker's 1913 publication on Indian Pigeons and Doves cautioned that the indigenous names used for the wedge-tailed green pigeon often overlapped with those used for the yellow-footed green pigeon and pin-tailed green pigeon.

According to Baker in 1913, the wedge-tailed green pigeon may have been referred to by the following names: "Sang-pong" in the Lepcha language, "Daorep-galou" in the Kachari language, "Lumba-dum Kohhlu" in Hindi, "Bor Haitha" in Assamese, "Harial" in the language spoken by the people of the Terai region at the time, and "Ngu" in Burmese.

However, the Lepcha name for Treron sphenurus is recorded by contemporary sources as "Kuhu", while the pin-tailed green pigeon (Treron apicauda) is recorded as being called "Sang-pong" by the Lepcha people.

There are notable archaeological references to birds and doves in ancient and early medieval Assam, though they cannot be conclusively identified as wedge-tailed green pigeons.

A 2023 archaeological study by Y. S. Sanathana and Manjil Hazarika records a sculpture known as the Da-Parbatiya dove. This small sculpture, described by archaeologists as "likely to be a depiction of a dove", was featured beneath a carved depiction of the god Kartikeya at the ruins of the Da-Parbatiya temple ruins in Tezpur. This temple was associated with the Pragjyotisha-Kamarupa kingdom of the Brahmaputra Valley, which flourished from approximately the 3rd through 12th centuries CE. The archaeologists suggested that the small carved pigeon or dove statue may be associated with the Shiva Purana, a Hindu Religious text. In part of the story of the Shiva Purana, the god Agni takes the form of a pigeon or dove and carries the god Shiva's reproductive material to the six Krittika goddesses, contributing to the birth of Kartikeya. However, the bird carved at the temple of Da-Parbatiya cannot definitely be identified as a wedge-tailed green pigeon.
