= Pungro =

- Location in Nagaland
- Coordinates: 25.812°N 94.842°E
- Country: India
- State: Nagaland
- District: Kiphire district

Population (2011)
  - Total: 5,716
- Time zone: UTC+5:30 (IST)

Pungro is a settlement in Kiphire district of Nagaland state of India.

== Population ==
According to the 2011 Census of India, there were two parts of Pungro. Pungro Hq had a population of 4,744, while Pungro Village had a population of 972 people.
