= Seyochung =

- Location in Nagaland
- Coordinates: 25.924°N 94.644°E
- Country: India
- State: Nagaland
- District: Kiphire district

Population (2011)
  - Total: 2,297
- Time zone: UTC+5:30 (IST)

Seyochung is a settlement in Kiphire district of Nagaland state of India.

== Population ==
According to the 2011 Census of India, there were two parts of Seyochung. Seyochung Hq had a population of 840, while Seyochung Village had a population of 1,457 people.
