= Lok Sabha =

Lower house of the Parliament of India

- 18th Lok Sabha

Type
- Type: Lower house of the Parliament of India
- Term limits: 5 years unless dissolved early

Leadership
- Speaker: Om Birla, BJP since 17 June 2019
- Prime Minister (Leader of the House): Narendra Modi, BJP since 26 May 2014
- Leader of the Opposition: Rahul Gandhi, INC since 9 June 2024
- Secretary General: Utpal Kumar Singh since 30 November 2020

Structure
- Seats: 543
- Political groups: Government (319) NDA (319): BJP (241); NCPI (20); TDP (16); SHS (13); JD(U) (12); LJP(RV) (5); JD(S) (2); JSP (2); RLD (2); AD(S) (1); AGP (1); AJSU (1); HAM(S) (1); NCP (1); SKM (1); Official Opposition (183); INDIA (183): INC (98); SP (37); MAITC (8); NCP-SP (8); CPI(M) (4); RJD (4); IUML (3); JMM (3); SS(UBT) (3); CPI (2); CPI(ML)L (2); VCK (2); BAP (1); JKNC (1); KEC (1); MDMK (1); RSP (1); RLP (1); IND (3) (Note: Mohmad Haneefa from Ladakh, Vishal Patil from Sangli and Pappu Yadav from Purnia.); Other Opposition (38): DMK (22); YSRCP (4); AAP (3); AD(WPD) (2); AIMIM (1); ASP(KR) (1); JKAIP (1); SAD (1); UPPL (1); ZPM (1); IND (1) (Note: Umeshbhai Patel from Daman and Diu.); Vacant (3) Vacant (3) (Note: Basirhat (1), (Note: Death of Haji Nurul Islam.) Shillong (1) (Note: Death of Ricky A. J. Syngkon.) and Srinagar (1). (Note: Resignation of Aga Syed Ruhullah Mehdi.))
- Length of term: 5 years

Elections
- Voting system: First-past-the-post voting
- First election: 25 October 1951 – 21 February 1952
- Last election: 19 April – 1 June 2024
- Next election: By May or June 2029

Meeting place
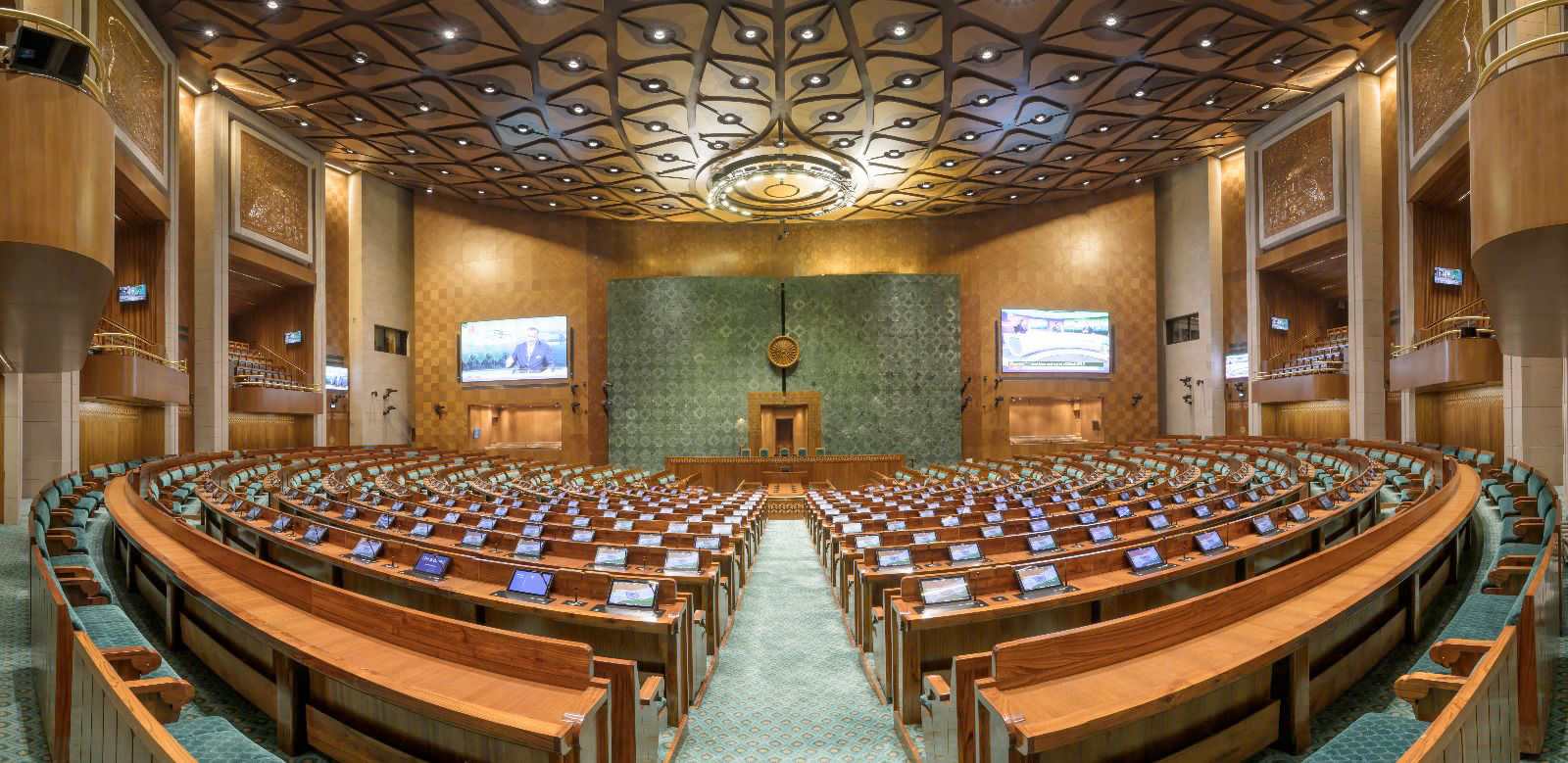
- Lok Sabha Chamber, Sansad Bhavan, 118, Rafi Marg, New Delhi, Delhi, India – 110001; 28°37′3″N 77°12′30″E

Website
- sansad.in/ls

Constitution
- Constitution of India

Rules
- The Rules of Procedure and Conduct of Business in Lok Sabha (English)

The Lok Sabha, also known as the House of the People, is the lower house of the bicameral Parliament of India, where the upper house is Rajya Sabha. Members of the Lok Sabha are elected by an adult universal suffrage and a first-past-the-post system to represent their respective constituencies, and they hold their seats for five years or until the body is dissolved by the president of India on the advice of the union council of ministers. The house meets in the Lok Sabha chamber of the Parliament House in New Delhi.

The maximum membership of the house as allotted by the Constitution of India is 552 before the abolition of Anglo-Indian seats, currently it is 550. As of 2025, the house has 543 elected members. Between 1952 and 2020, two additional members of the Anglo-Indian community were nominated by the president of India on the advice of the Indian government, and the practice was abolished in January 2020 by the 104th amendment to the Indian constitution. The new parliament has a maximum seating capacity for 888 members in Lok Sabha.

About 131 seats (24.03%) are reserved for representatives of scheduled castes (84) and scheduled tribes (47). The quorum for the House is 10% of the total membership the house. Unless dissolved sooner, the house continues to operate for five years from the date of its first meeting. However, when a state of emergency in India is declared, this period may be extended by the parliament of India by law or decree. The 18th Lok Sabha is the latest to be elected in May 2024. The Lok Sabha proceedings are televised live on Sansad TV, operating from within the parliament premises.

An exercise to redraw the boundaries of the Lok Sabha constituencies is carried out by the delimitation commission. It is carried out every decade based on the census of India, the last of which was conducted in 2011. This provision was temporarily suspended between 1976 and 2001 following a constitutional amendment to incentivize the family planning program which was being implemented. The elections for the seats are conducted by the election commission.

== History ==
A major portion of the Indian subcontinent was under British rule from 1858 to 1947. During this period, the office of the Secretary of State for India (along with the Council of India) was the authority through whom British Parliament exercised its rule in the Indian sub-continent, and the office of Viceroy of India was created, along with an Executive Council in India, consisting of high officials of the British government. The Indian Councils Act 1861 provided for a Legislative Council consisting of the members of the Executive Council and non-official members. The Indian Councils Act 1892 established legislatures in each of the provinces of British India and increased the powers of the Legislative Council. Although these Acts increased the representation of Indians in the government, their power remained limited, and the electorate very small. The Indian Councils Act 1909 admitted some Indians to the various councils. The Government of India Act 1919 further expanded the participation of Indians in the administration, creating the Central Legislative Assembly, for which Parliament House, New Delhi, was built and opened in 1927.

The Government of India Act 1935 introduced provincial autonomy and proposed a federal structure in India. The Indian Independence Act 1947, passed by the British parliament on 18 July 1947, divided British India (which did not include the Princely states) into two newly independent countries, India and Pakistan, which were to be dominions under the Crown until they had each enacted a new constitution. The Constituent Assembly was divided into two for the separate nations, with each new Assembly having sovereign powers transferred to it for the respective dominion.

The Constitution of India was adopted on 26 November 1949 and came into effect on 26 January 1950, proclaiming India to be a sovereign, democratic republic. This contained the founding principles of the law of the land which would govern India in its new form, which now included all the princely states which had not acceded to Pakistan.

According to Article 79 (Part V-The Union.) of the Constitution of India, the Parliament of India consists of the President of India and the two Houses of Parliament known as the Council of States (Rajya Sabha) and the House of the People (Lok Sabha).

The Lok Sabha (House of the People) was duly constituted for the first time on 17 April 1952 after the first General Elections held from 25 October 1951 to 21 February 1952.

=== List ===
Formation of Lok Sabha over time
Lok Sabha	Commencement Date	Dissolution Date	Duration	Prime Minister	Deputy Prime Minister
First	13 May 1952	4 April 1957	4 years, 10 months and 22 days	Jawaharlal Nehru	Vacant
Second	10 May 1957	31 March 1962	4 years, 10 months and 21 days	Jawaharlal Nehru	Vacant
Third	16 April 1962	3 March 1967	4 years, 10 months and 15 days	Jawaharlal Nehru, Lal Bahadur Shastri and Indira Gandhi	Vacant
Fourth	16 March 1967	27 December 1970	3 years, 9 months and 11 days	Indira Gandhi	Morarji Desai (till 1969)
Fifth	19 March 1971	18 January 1977	5 years, 9 months and 30 days	Indira Gandhi	Vacant
Sixth	25 March 1977	22 August 1979	2 years, 4 months and 28 days	Morarji Desai and Charan Singh	Charan Singh, Jagjivan Ram and Yashwantrao Chavan
Seventh	21 January 1980	31 December 1984	4 years, 11 months and 10 days	Indira Gandhi and Rajiv Gandhi	Vacant
Eighth	15 January 1985	27 November 1989	4 years, 10 months and 12 days	Rajiv Gandhi	Vacant
Ninth	18 December 1989	13 March 1991	1 year, 2 months and 23 days	V. P. Singh and Chandra Shekhar	Devi Lal
Tenth	9 July 1991	10 May 1996	4 years, 10 months and 1 day	P. V. Narasimha Rao	Vacant
Eleventh	22 May 1996	4 December 1997	1 year, 6 months and 12 days	Atal Bihari Vajpayee, H. D. Deve Gowda and I. K. Gujral	Vacant
Twelfth	23 March 1998	26 April 1999	1 year, 1 month and 3 days	Atal Bihari Vajpayee	Vacant
Thirteenth	20 October 1999	6 February 2004	4 years, 3 months and 17 days	Atal Bihari Vajpayee	Lal Krishna Advani
Fourteenth	2 June 2004	18 May 2009	4 years, 11 months and 16 days	Manmohan Singh	Vacant
Fifteenth	1 June 2009	18 May 2014	4 years, 11 months and 17 days	Manmohan Singh	Vacant
Sixteenth	4 June 2014	24 May 2019	4 years, 11 months and 20 days	Narendra Modi	Vacant
Seventeenth	17 June 2019	5 June 2024	4 years, 11 months and 19 days	Narendra Modi	Vacant
Eighteenth	24 June 2024	present	2 years, 4 months and 21 days	Narendra Modi	Vacant

== Qualifications ==
Article 84 (under Part V. – The Union) of Indian Constitution sets qualifications for being a member of Lok Sabha, which are as follows:

1. They should be a citizen of India, and must subscribe before the Election Commission of India, an oath or affirmation according to the form set out for the purpose in the Third Schedule of the Indian Constitution.
2. They should not be less than 25 years of age.
3. They possess other such qualifications as may be prescribed in that behalf by or under any law made by the Parliament.
4. They should not be proclaimed criminal i.e. they should not be a convict, a confirmed debtor or otherwise disqualified by law; and
5. They should have their name in the electoral rolls in any part of the country.

However, a member can be disqualified from being a member of Parliament:

1. If they hold the office of profit;
2. If they are of unsound mind and stand so declared by a competent court
3. If they are an undischarged insolvent;
4. If they are not a citizen of India, or have voluntarily acquired the citizenship of a foreign State, or are under any acknowledgement of allegiance or adherence to a foreign State;
5. If they are violating party discipline (as per the Tenth Schedule of the constitution); disqualified under Representation of People Act.

A seat in the Lok Sabha will become vacant in the following circumstances (during the normal functioning of the House):

1. When the holder of the seat, by writing to the speaker, resigns.
2. When the holder of the seat is absent from 60 consecutive days of proceedings of the House, without prior permission of the Speaker.
3. When the holder of the seat is subject to any disqualifications mentioned in the Constitution or any law enacted by Parliament.
4. A seat may also be vacated when the holder stands disqualified under the 'Anti-Defection Law'.

Furthermore, as per article 101 (Part V.—The Union) of the Indian Constitution, a person cannot be:

1. A member of both Houses of Parliament and provision shall be made by Parliament by law for the vacation by a person who is chosen a member of both Houses of his seat in one House or the other.
2. A member both of Parliament and of a House of the Legislature of a State.

=== System of elections in Lok Sabha ===
Members of the Lok Sabha are directly elected by the people of India, based on universal suffrage. Elections are by the people directly to the Lok Sabha and each state is divided into territorial constituencies under two provisions of the Constitution:

1. Each state is allotted several seats in the Lok Sabha in such a manner that the ratio between that number and its population was as close to uniform as possible. This provision does not apply to states having a population of less than 6 million. The number of seats per state has been frozen under the constitutional amendment of 1976.
2. Each state is divided into territorial constituencies in such a manner that the ratio between the population of each constituency and the number of seats allotted to it (in each case, one) remain the same throughout the state. This principle is upheld by the boundary reviews mentioned above.

Notes:

1. The expression "population" while distributing seats among states refers to the population ascertained at the census of 1971, per the Constitutional Amendment of 1976.
2. The expression "population" while distributing constituencies within a state refers to the population ascertained at the census of 2011.

== Powers ==
The Lok Sabha has certain powers that make it more powerful than the Rajya Sabha.

- Motions of no confidence against the government can be introduced and passed in the Lok Sabha. If passed by a majority vote, the Prime Minister and the Council of Ministers resign collectively. The Rajya Sabha has no power over such a motion and hence has no real power over the executive. This is because the Constitution of India has only made the Union Council of ministers responsible to the Lok Sabha, not to the Rajya Sabha.
- Money bills can only be introduced in the Lok Sabha, and upon being passed, are sent to the Rajya Sabha, where it can be deliberated on for up to 14 days. If not rejected by the Rajya Sabha, or 14 days lapse from the introduction of the bill in the Rajya Sabha without any action by the House, or recommendations made by the Rajya Sabha are not accepted by the Lok Sabha, the bill is considered passed. The budget is presented in the Lok Sabha by the Finance Minister in the name of the President of India.
- In matters about non-financial (ordinary) bills, after the bill has been passed by the House where it was originally tabled (Lok Sabha or Rajya Sabha), it is sent to the other house, where it may be kept for a maximum period of 6 months. If the other House rejects the bill or a period of 6 months elapses without any action by that House, or the House that originally tabled the bill does not accept the recommendations made by the members of the other house, it results in a deadlock. This is resolved by a joint session of both Houses, presided over by the speaker of the Lok Sabha and decided by a simple majority. Though the Constitution has placed both houses on the same footing in this regard, in reality, it is the Lok Sabha's opinions that mostly prevail—due to its bigger numerical strength.
- Equal Powers with the Rajya Sabha in initiating and passing any Bill for Constitutional Amendment (by a majority of the total membership of the House and at least two-thirds majority of the members present and voting).
- Equal Powers with the Rajya Sabha in initiating and passing a motion for the impeachment of the President (by two-thirds of the membership of the House).
- Equal Powers with the Rajya Sabha in the impeachment process (initiating and passing a motion for the removal) of the judges of the Supreme Court and the state High Courts (by a majority of the membership of the House and at least two-thirds majority of the members present and voting), who then can be removed by the President of India.
- Equal Powers with the Rajya Sabha in initiating and passing a resolution declaring war or national emergency (by two-thirds majority) or constitutional emergency (by simple majority) in a state.
- If the Lok Sabha is dissolved before or after the declaration of a National Emergency, the Rajya Sabha becomes the sole Parliament. It cannot be dissolved. This is a limitation on the Lok Sabha. But there is a possibility that the president can exceed the term to not more than 1 year under the proclamation of emergency and the same would be lowered down to six-month if the said proclamation ceases to operate.

In conclusion, the Lok Sabha is more powerful than the Rajya Sabha in almost all matters. Even in those matters in which the Constitution has placed both Houses on an equal footing, the Lok Sabha has more influence due to its greater numerical strength. This is typical of parliamentary democracies, many of which have a lower house that is more powerful than the upper.

== Procedure ==
=== Procedure in the House ===
The Rules of Procedure and Conduct of Business in Lok Sabha and Directions issued by the Speaker from time to time there under regulate the procedure in Lok Sabha. The items of business, a notice of which is received from the Ministers/ Private Members and admitted by the Speaker, are included in the daily List of Business which is printed and circulated to members in advance.

=== Sessions ===
The period during which the House meets to conduct its business is called a session. The Constitution empowers the President to summon each House at such intervals that there should not be more than a six-month gap between the two sessions. Hence the Parliament must meet at least twice a year. But, three sessions of Lok Sabha are held in a year:

- Budget session: February to May.
- Monsoon session: July to September.
- Winter session: November to mid-December.

When in session, Lok Sabha holds its sittings usually from 11 a.m. to 1 p.m. and from 2 p.m. to 6 p.m. On some days the sittings are continuously held without observing lunch break and are also extended beyond 6 p.m. depending upon the business before the House. Lok Sabha does not ordinarily sit on Saturdays and Sundays and other closed holidays.

=== Question Hour ===
The first hour of every sitting is called Question Hour. Asking questions in Parliament is the free and unfettered right of members, and during Question Hour they may ask questions of ministers on different aspects of administration and government policy in the national and international spheres. Every minister whose turn it is to answer questions has to stand up and answer for his department's acts of omission or commission.

Questions are of three types—Starred, Unstarred, and Short Notice. A Starred Question is one to which a member desires an oral answer in the House and which is distinguished by an asterisk mark. An unstarred question is not called for oral answer in the house and on which no supplementary questions can consequently be asked. An answer to such a question is given in writing. A minimum period of notice for starred/unstarred questions is 10 clear days. If the questions given notice are admitted by the Speaker, they are listed and printed for an answer on the dates allotted to the Ministries to which the subject matter of the question pertains.

The normal period of notice does not apply to short-notice questions that relate to matters of urgent public importance. However, a short-notice question may be answered only on short notice if so permitted by the Speaker and the Minister concerned is prepared to answer it at shorter notice. A short-notice question is taken up for answer immediately after the Question Hour, popularly known as Zero Hour.

=== Zero Hour ===
The time immediately following the Question Hour has come to be known as "Zero Hour". It starts at around noon (hence the name) and members can, with prior notice to the Speaker, raise issues of importance during this time. Typically, discussions on important Bills, the Budget, and other issues of national importance take place from 2 p.m. onwards.

=== Business after Question Hour ===
After the Question Hour, the House takes up miscellaneous items of work before proceeding to the main business of the day. These may consist of one or more of the following: Adjournment Motions, Questions involving breaches of Privileges, Papers to be laid on the Table, Communication of any messages from Rajya Sabha, Intimations regarding President's assent to Bills, Calling Attention Notices, Matters under Rule 377, Presentation of Reports of Parliamentary Committee, Presentation of Petitions, miscellaneous statements by Ministers, Motions regarding elections to Committees, Bills to be withdrawn or introduced.

=== Main business ===
The main business of the day may be consideration of a bill or financial business or consideration of a resolution or a motion.

==== Legislative business ====
Legislative proposals in the form of a bill can be brought forward either by a minister or by an individual member. In the former case, it is known as a government bill and in the latter case, it is known as a private members' bill. Every bill passes through three stages—each called readings—before it is passed. To become law it must be passed by both the houses of Parliament, the Lok Sabha and the Rajya Sabha, and then assented to by the president.

==== Financial business ====
The presentation, discussion of, and voting on the annual general and railways budgets—followed by the passing of the appropriations Bill and the finance bill—is a long, drawn-out process that takes up a major part of the time of the House during its budget session every year.

==== Motions and resolutions ====
Among other kinds of business that come up before the House are resolutions and motions. Resolutions and motions may be brought forward by the government or by individual members. The government may move a resolution or a motion for obtaining the sanction to a scheme or opinion of the house on an important matter of policy or a grave situation. Similarly, an individual member may move a resolution or motion to draw the attention of the house and the government to a particular problem. The last two and half hours of sitting every Friday are generally allotted for the transaction of individual members' business. While private members' bills are taken up on one Friday, private members' resolutions are taken up on the succeeding Friday, and so on.

=== Parliamentary committees ===
Most of the business of drafting a bill or amendments is initially discussed and debated in the parliamentary committees. Since the time for legislation is limited, the work of all departments of the government and any special focus tasks are delegated to the committees, wherein the committees shall prepare the initial draft of the bill/amendment for consideration by both the houses. They consist of members of both houses.

There are primarily two kinds of parliamentary committees based on their nature:-

- Parliament Standing Committees (PSC) – Permanent in nature, reconstituted from time to time with every new election.
  - Department based
  - Others
- Ad hoc committees – Created for a specific purpose and ceases to exist when that purpose is achieved.

=== Half-an-Hour discussion ===
A half-an-hour discussion can be raised on a matter of sufficient public importance which has been the subject of a recent question in Lok Sabha irrespective of the fact whether the question was answered orally or the answer was laid on the Table of the House and the answer which needs elucidation on a matter of fact. Normally not more than half an hour is allowed for such a discussion. Usually, the half-an-hour discussion is listed on Mondays, Wednesdays, and Fridays only. In one session, a member is allowed to raise not more than two half-hour discussions. During the discussion, the member, who has given notice, makes a short statement, and not more than four members, who have intimated earlier and have secured one of the four places on the ballot, are permitted to ask a question each for further elucidating any matter of fact. Thereafter, the minister makes replies. There is no formal motion before the house nor voting.

=== Discussion on matters of urgent public importance ===
Members may raise discussions on matters of urgent public importance with the permission of the Speaker. Such discussions may take place two days a week. No formal motion is moved in the House nor is there any voting on such a discussion.

=== Debate in the House ===
After the member who initiates discussion on an item of business has spoken, other members can speak on that item of business in such order as the Speaker may call upon them. Only one member can speak at a time and all speeches are directed to the chair. A matter requiring the decision of the House is decided to employ a question put by the Speaker on a motion made by a member.

==== Division ====
A division is one of the forms in which the decision of the House is ascertained. Normally, when a motion is put to the House members for and against it indicate their opinion by saying "Aye" or "No" from their seats. The chair goes by the voices and declares that the motion is either accepted or rejected by the House. If a member challenges the decision, the chair orders that the lobbies be cleared. Then the division bell is rung and an entire network of bells installed in the various parts and rooms in Parliament House and Parliament House Annexe rings continuously for three and a half minutes. Members and Ministers rush to the Chamber from all sides. After the bell stops, all the doors to the Chamber are closed and nobody can enter or leave the Chamber till the division is over. Then the chair puts the question for a second time and declares whether in its opinion the "Ayes" or the "Noes", have it. If the opinion so declared is again challenged, the chair asks the votes to be recorded by operating the Automatic Vote Recording Equipment.

=== Automatic vote recording system ===
With the announcement of the Speaker for recording the votes, the Secretary-General of the Lok Sabha presses the button of a keyboard. Then a gong sounds, serving as a signal to members for casting their votes. To vote, each member present in the chamber has to flip a switch and then operate one of the three pushbuttons fixed in their seat. The push switch must be kept pressed simultaneously until the gong sounds for the second time after 10 seconds. There are two indicator boards installed in the wall on either side of the Speaker's chair in the chamber. Each vote cast by a member is flashed here. Immediately after the votes are cast, they are totalled mechanically and the details of the results are flashed on the result indicator boards installed in the railings of the Speakers and diplomatic galleries.

Divisions are normally held with the aid of automatic vote recording equipment. Where so directed by the Speaker in terms of the relevant provision in the Rules of Procedure etc. In the Lok Sabha, divisions may be held either by the distribution of 'Aye'/'No' and 'Abstention' slips to members in the House or by the members recording their votes by going into the lobbies. There is an indicator board in the machine room showing the name of each member. The result of the division and vote cast by each member with the aid of automatic vote recording equipment also appear on this board and immediately a photograph of the indicator board is taken. Later the photograph is enlarged and the names of members who voted 'Ayes' and for 'Noes' are determined with the help of the photograph and incorporated in Lok Sabha debates.

=== Publication of debates ===
Three versions of Lok Sabha debates are prepared: the Hindi version, the English version, and the original version. Only the Hindi and English versions are printed. The original version, in cyclostyled form, is kept in the Parliament Library for record and reference. The Hindi version contains proceedings (all questions asked and answers are given thereto and speeches made) in Hindi and verbatim Hindi translation of proceedings in English or regional languages. The English version contains proceedings in English and the English translation of the proceedings take place in Hindi or any regional language. The original version, however, contains proceedings in Hindi or English as they actually took place in the House and also the English/Hindi translation of speeches made in regional languages.

If conflicting legislation is enacted by the two Houses, a joint sitting is held to resolve the differences. In such a session, the members of the Lok Sabha would generally prevail, since the Lok Sabha includes more than twice as many members as the Rajya Sabha.

== Officers of Lok Sabha ==
Speaker and Deputy Speaker

As per Article 93 of the Indian Constitution, the Lok Sabha has a Speaker and a Deputy Speaker. In the Lok Sabha, both presiding officers — the Speaker and the Deputy Speaker — are elected from among its members by a simple majority of members present and voting in the House. No specific qualifications are prescribed for being elected Speaker; the Constitution only requires that Speaker should be a member of the House. But an understanding of the Constitution and the laws of the country and the rules of procedure and conventions of Parliament is considered a major asset for the holder of the office of the Speaker. Vacation and resignation of, and removal from, the offices of Speaker and Deputy Speaker are mentioned under Article 94 of the Constitution of India. As per Article 94 of the Indian Constitution, a Speaker or a Deputy Speaker should vacate their office, a) if they cease to be a member of the House of the People, b) they resign, or c) is removed from office by a resolution of the House passed by a majority.

The Speaker of Lok Sabha is both a member of the House and its Presiding Officer. The Speaker conducts the business in the House. They decide whether a bill is a money bill or not. They maintain discipline and decorum in the house and can punish a member for their unruly behaviour by suspending them. They permit the moving of various kinds of motions and resolutions like the motion of no confidence, motion of adjournment, motion of censure and calling attention notice as per the rules. The Speaker decides on the agenda to be taken up for discussion during the meeting. It is the Speaker of the Lok Sabha who presides over joint sittings called in the event of disagreement between the two Houses on a legislative measure. Following the 52nd Constitution amendment, the Speaker is vested with the power relating to the disqualification of a member of the Lok Sabha on grounds of defection. The Speaker makes obituary references in the House, formal references to important national and international events, and the valedictory address after every Session of the Lok Sabha and also when the term of the House expires. Though a member of the House, the Speaker does not vote in the House except on those rare occasions when there is a tie at the end of a decision. To date, the Speaker of the Lok Sabha has not been called upon to exercise this unique casting vote. While the office of Speaker is vacant due to absence/resignation/removal, the duties of the office are performed by the Deputy Speaker or, if the office of Deputy Speaker is also vacant, by such member of the House of the People as the President may appoint for the purpose. The Lok Sabha has also a separate non-elected Secretariat staff.

Shri G. V. Mavalankar was the first Speaker of Lok Sabha (15 May 1952 – 27 February 1956) and Shri M. Ananthasayanam Ayyangar was the first Deputy Speaker (30 May 1952 – 7 March 1956). In the 17th Lok Sabha, Om Birla is the current Speaker.

Secretariat

The Secretariat of Lok Sabha was set up according to the provisions contained in Article 98 of the Constitution. The said Article, which provides for a separate secretarial staff for each House of Parliament, reads as follows:- 98. Secretariat of Parliament – Each House of Parliament shall have a separate secretarial staff: Provided that nothing in this clause shall be construed as preventing the creation of posts common to both Houses of Parliament. (2) Parliament may by law regulate the recruitment and the conditions of service of persons appointed to the secretarial staff of either House of Parliament.

The Lok Sabha Secretariat functions under the overall guidance and control of the Speaker. The main activities of the Secretariat among other things include the following:

(i) providing secretarial assistance and support to the effective functioning of the House of the People (Lok Sabha) possible to Members of Lok Sabha; (ii) providing amenities as admissible to Members of Lok Sabha; (iii) servicing the various Parliamentary Committees; (iv) preparing research and reference material and bringing out various publications; (v) recruitment of manpower in the Lok Sabha Secretariat and attending to personnel matters; & (vi) preparing and publishing a record of the day-to-day proceedings of the Lok Sabha and bringing out such other publications, as may be required concerning the functioning of the Lok Sabha and its Committees, among other things.

In the discharge of his constitutional and statutory responsibilities, the Speaker of the Lok Sabha is assisted by the Secretary-General, who holds the rank equivalent to the Cabinet Secretary to the Government of India. The Secretary-General, in turn, is assisted by senior functionaries at the level of Secretary, Additional Secretary, Joint Secretary and other officers and staff of the Secretariat. Since November 2020, the Secretary-General of Lok Sabha is Utpal Kumar Singh, IAS.

== Lok Sabha general elections ==
Each Lok Sabha is constituted after a general election:

Lok Sabha	General Election
1st Lok Sabha	1951–52 Indian general election
2nd Lok Sabha	1957 Indian general election
3rd Lok Sabha	1962 Indian general election
4th Lok Sabha	1967 Indian general election
5th Lok Sabha	1971 Indian general election
6th Lok Sabha	1977 Indian general election
7th Lok Sabha	1980 Indian general election
8th Lok Sabha	1984 Indian general election
9th Lok Sabha	1989 Indian general election
10th Lok Sabha	1991 Indian general election
11th Lok Sabha	1996 Indian general election
12th Lok Sabha	1998 Indian general election
13th Lok Sabha	1999 Indian general election
14th Lok Sabha	2004 Indian general election
15th Lok Sabha	2009 Indian general election
16th Lok Sabha	2014 Indian general election
17th Lok Sabha	2019 Indian general election
18th Lok Sabha	2024 Indian general election

== Statewise representation ==
As of 26 January 2020, the Lok Sabha is composed of 543 members made up of up to 524 members representing the people of 28 states and 19 members representing people of 8 Union territories based on their population. While maximum seats can now go up to 550 even though maximum size of the Lok Sabha as outlined in the Constitution of India, at its commencement, was 552 members because after The Constitution (One Hundred and Fourth Amendment) Act, 2019, Article 334 (b) of the Constitution of India was maintained at seventy years. See the table below for details:

State/ UT*	Seats
Andaman and Nicobar Islands*	1
Andhra Pradesh	25
Arunachal Pradesh	2
Assam	14
Bihar	40
Chandigarh*	1
Chhattisgarh	11
Dadra and Nagar Haveli and Daman and Diu*	2
Delhi (NCT)*	7
Goa	2
Gujarat	26
Haryana	10
Himachal Pradesh	4
Jammu and Kashmir*	5
Jharkhand	14
Karnataka	28
Kerala	20
Ladakh*	1
Lakshadweep*	1
Madhya Pradesh	29
Maharashtra	48
Manipur	2
Meghalaya	2
Mizoram	1
Nagaland	1
Odisha	21
Puducherry*	1
Punjab	13
Rajasthan	25
Sikkim	1
Tamil Nadu	39
Telangana	17
Tripura	2
Uttarakhand	5
Uttar Pradesh	80
West Bengal	42
Total	543

== Membership by party ==
No. of Lok Sabha MP's party-wise:

As of 12 October 2026

Alliance	Party	No. of MPs	Leader of the Party
Government; NDA; Seats: 319	BJP	241	Narendra Modi (Leader of the House)
Government; NDA; Seats: 319	NCPI	20	Sudip Bandyopadhyay
Government; NDA; Seats: 319	TDP	16	Lavu Sri Krishna Devarayalu
Government; NDA; Seats: 319	SHS	13	Shrikant Shinde
Government; NDA; Seats: 319	JD(U)	12	Dileshwar Kamait
Government; NDA; Seats: 319	LJP(RV)	5	Chirag Paswan
Government; NDA; Seats: 319	JD(S)	2	M. Mallesh Babu
Government; NDA; Seats: 319	JSP	2	Vallabhaneni Balashowry
Government; NDA; Seats: 319	RLD	2	Rajkumar Sangwan
Government; NDA; Seats: 319	AD(S)	1	Anupriya Patel
Government; NDA; Seats: 319	AGP	1	Phani Bhusan Choudhury
Government; NDA; Seats: 319	AJSU	1	Chandra Prakash Choudhary
Government; NDA; Seats: 319	HAM(S)	1	Jitan Ram Manjhi
Government; NDA; Seats: 319	NCP	1	Sunil Tatkare
Government; NDA; Seats: 319	SKM	1	Indra Hang Subba
INDIA; Seats: 183	INC	98	Rahul Gandhi (Leader of the Opposition)
INDIA; Seats: 183	SP	37	Akhilesh Yadav
INDIA; Seats: 183	MAITC	8	Abhishek Banerjee
INDIA; Seats: 183	NCP-SP	8	Supriya Sule
INDIA; Seats: 183	CPI(M)	4	K. Radhakrishnan
INDIA; Seats: 183	RJD	4	Abhay Kumar Sinha
INDIA; Seats: 183	IUML	3	E. T. Mohammed Basheer
INDIA; Seats: 183	SS(UBT)	3	Arvind Sawant
INDIA; Seats: 183	JMM	3	Joba Majhi
INDIA; Seats: 183	CPI	2	K. Subbarayan
INDIA; Seats: 183	CPI(ML)L	2	Raja Ram Singh
INDIA; Seats: 183	VCK	2	Thol. Thirumavalavan
INDIA; Seats: 183	BAP	1	Rajkumar Roat
INDIA; Seats: 183	JKNC	1	Mian Altaf Ahmed Larvi
INDIA; Seats: 183	KEC	1	Francis George
INDIA; Seats: 183	MDMK	1	Durai Vaiko
INDIA; Seats: 183	RLP	1	Hanuman Beniwal
INDIA; Seats: 183	RSP	1	N. K. Premachandran
INDIA; Seats: 183	IND	3	Steady
Unaligned; Seats: 38	DMK	22	T. R. Baalu
Unaligned; Seats: 38	YSRCP	4	P. V. Midhun Reddy
Unaligned; Seats: 38	AAP	3	Gurmeet Singh Meet Hayer
Unaligned; Seats: 38	AD (WPD)	2	Sarabjeet Singh Khalsa
Unaligned; Seats: 38	AIMIM	1	Asaduddin Owaisi
Unaligned; Seats: 38	ASP(KR)	1	Chandrashekhar Azad
Unaligned; Seats: 38	JKAIP	1	Sheikh Abdul Rashid
Unaligned; Seats: 38	SAD	1	Harsimrat Kaur Badal
Unaligned; Seats: 38	UPPL	1	Joyanta Basumatary
Unaligned; Seats: 38	ZPM	1	Richard Vanlalhmangaiha
Unaligned; Seats: 38	IND	1	Umeshbhai Patel
Vacant		3	Basirhat; Shillong; Srinagar
Total		543	

== See also ==
- List of Indian general elections
- List of constituencies of the Lok Sabha
- Parliament of India
- Rajya Sabha
