= Langate =

- Town
- Location in Jammu and Kashmir, India Langate (India)
- Coordinates: 34.41°N 74.29°E
- Country: India
- Union Territory: Jammu and Kashmir
- District: Kupwara
- Elevation: 1,583 m (5,194 ft)

Population (2001)
  - Total: 10,624

Languages
  - Official: Kashmiri, Urdu, Hindi, Dogri, English
- Time zone: UTC+5:30 (IST)
- PIN: 193302
- Vehicle registration: JK09
- Website: kupwara.nic.in

Langate is a notified area (town) and tehsil headquarters in the Kupwara district of Jammu and Kashmir, India. It is located 16 km south of the district headquarters Kupwara and 70 km northwest from the state capital Srinagar. The landmark at Langate chowk is public park Langate.

Langate tehsil is bounded by Kralgund tehsil on the south, and Handwara tehsil on the north. Sopore, Baramulla, and Watergam are nearby towns.

== Education Fest 2022,2024 & 2025 ==
As part of development activities taking place in and around all of Kashmir, an Education Fest was organised for the students of North Kashmir in Langate wherein over 19 colleges from all across India took part to guide and counsel the students to make correct life choices . Not only this, but scholarships were also offered to students who possessed the calibre to soar high in the sky and make a difference in the future. Scholarships worth almost Rs. 1.2 Cr was given to various students which also included the needy students. Education Festival 2025 held at Shubhana Stadium, Sopore, referencing a similar event from 2024.

== See also ==
- Unisoo, Langate
