= Kiphire district =

- District of Nagaland
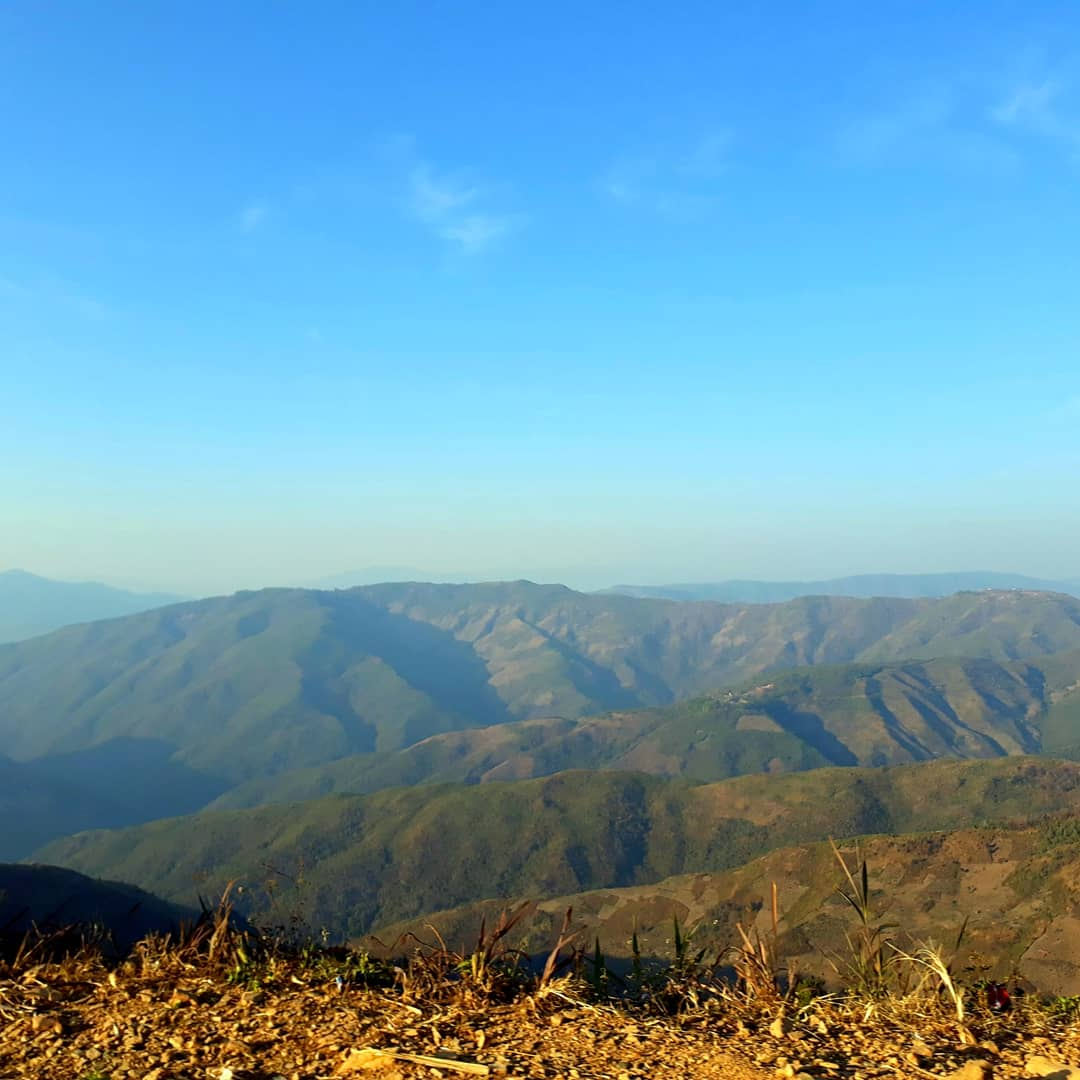
- Kiphire District of Nagaland
- Nickname: Land of Minerals
- Kiphire District in Nagaland
- Interactive map of Kiphire district
- Coordinates: 25°51′N 94°50′E
- Country: India
- State: Nagaland
- Headquarters: Kiphire

Government
  - Lok Sabha Constituency: Nagaland
  - MP: Tokheho Yepthomi, NDPP
  - Assembly constituencies: 2 constituencies
  - Deputy Commissioner: Sh. T. Wati Aier, (NCS)

Area
  - Total: 1,130 km^{2} (440 sq mi)
- Elevation: 896 m (2,940 ft)

Population (2011)
  - Total: 74,004
  - Density: 65.5/km^{2} (170/sq mi)

Demographics
  - Literacy: 69.54%
  - Sex ratio: 956 ♀/ 1000 ♂

Languages
  - Official: English
  - Spoken: Sangtam, Tikhir Sümi, Yimkhiung, English,
- Time zone: UTC+05:30 (IST)
- ISO 3166 code: IN-NL-PE
- Major highways: NH 202
- Website: kiphire.nic.in

Kiphire district (Pron:/ˈkɪfɑɪə/) is a district in the Indian state of Nagaland and the native home of the Sangtam Nagas. At 1,130 square kilometres (440 sq mi), it is the tenth-most populous district of Nagaland as of 2011. It was carved out of Tuensang district, becoming a district in 2004 along with Longleng district. Headquartered at Kiphire town, the district is 230 kilometres from the state capital Kohima.

== History ==
Kiphire district was carved out of Tuensang district in 2003, becoming the eleventh district of Nagaland. An administrative headquarters at Kiphire was created on 16 June 1952 after surveys were done to open more administrative headquarters. The district was formally created in 2003 with 7 subdivisions, namely, Seyochung, Pungro, Amahator, Kiphire Sadar, Longmatra, Sitimi and Kiusam. Another subdivision, namely, Khongsa was carved out of Pungro subdivision taking the total number of subdivisions of Kiphire district to 8. The first Base Area Superintendent of the district was S.D. Lakhar. The district was earlier part of the Tuensang district which was under the NEFA.

== Geography ==
The district comprises an area of 1,130 square kilometres (440 sq mi). It is bounded by Tuensang and Noklak districts in the north, Zünheboto district in the west, Phek district in the south and Myanmar in the east. It is headquartered at Kiphire, which is at an altitude of 896 m above sea level. The major towns of this district are Seyochung, Sitimi, Pungro and Kiphire. Nagaland's highest peak, Mount Saramati (3826 metres) is located in this district. Kiphire also has an earth station. Kisatong village is another tourist destination in the district.

=== Climate ===
The overall climate of the district is hot and humid during the summers and cold during winter. The temperature during the winter months touches a low of 2.7 degrees Celsius while in summer it reaches a high of 37.0 degrees Celsius. The district enjoys south-east Monsoon with average rainfall between 1500 mm to 1800 mm occurring over about 6 months from May to October.

== Administration ==
The district headquarters is at Kiphire. The district has 8 subdivisions namely Kiphire Sadar, Pungro, Seyochung, Khongsa, Amahator, Kiusam, Longmatra and Sitimi. The present Deputy Commissioner of the district is John Tsulise Sangtam.

== Demographics ==
Religion in Kiphire district (2011)
1. Christianity (97.0%)
2. Hinduism (1.41%)
3. Islam (0.76%)
4. Buddhism (0.28%)
5. Jainism (0.00%)
6. Sikhism (0.02%)
7. Not stated (0.50%)

Historical population
Year	Pop.	±%
1901	NA	—
1911	NA	—
1921	NA	—
1931	NA	—
1941	NA	—
1951	NA	—
1961	15,635	—
1971	18,398	+17.7%
1981	28,931	+57.3%
1991	51,845	+79.2%
2001	106,591	+105.6%
2011	74,004	−30.6%
Source: (Note: Kiphire district was created after 2001.)

According to the 2011 census Kiphire District has a population of 74,004, roughly equal to the nation of Dominica. This gives it a ranking of 625th in India (out of a total of 640). Kiphire has a sex ratio of 956 females for every 1000 males, and a literacy rate of 69.54%.

The district is predominantly inhabited by the Sangtam, Yimkhiung and Sümi tribes. The tribal population constitutes 96.5% of the entire district.

=== Religion ===
Christianity is the largest religion in the district, followed by 97% of the people. Hinduism is the second-largest religion with 1.41% adherents. Islam and Buddhism form 0.76% and 0.28% of the population respectively.

=== Languages ===
In 2011, the language distribution in Kiphire district was 63.7% Sangtam,27.45% Yimkhiungrü , 2.86% Hindi, 1.7% Bengali, 2.2 Tikhir and 1.1% Sümi speakers.

== Government and politics ==
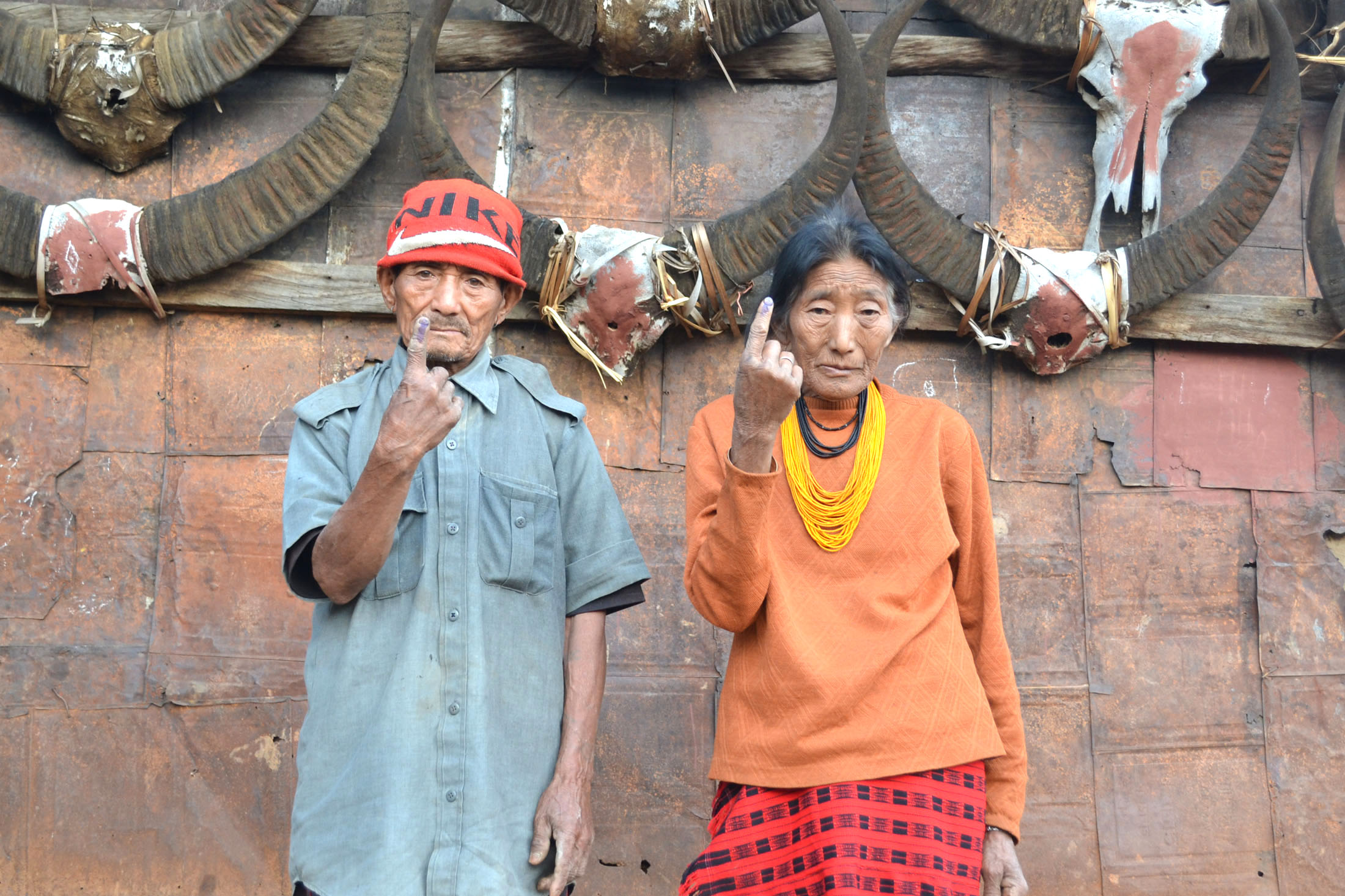
An old couple at a polling booth in Kiphire district, Nagaland

The district has two Vidhan Sabha constituencies, namely, Seyochung Sitimi and Pungro Kiphire. The MLA of Seyochung Sitimi is V. Kashiho Sangtam of the BJP and the MLA of Pungro Kiphire is S. Kiusumew Yimchunger from NPF. The last elections were held in 2018. The next legislative assembly election will be held in 2023.

As part of Lok Sabha, Kiphire district is part of the Nagaland Lok Sabha constituency. In the 2024 general election, S. Supongperen Jamir of the INC won, flipping the seat which was previously held by the NDPP. The next general election is in 2029.

== Economy ==
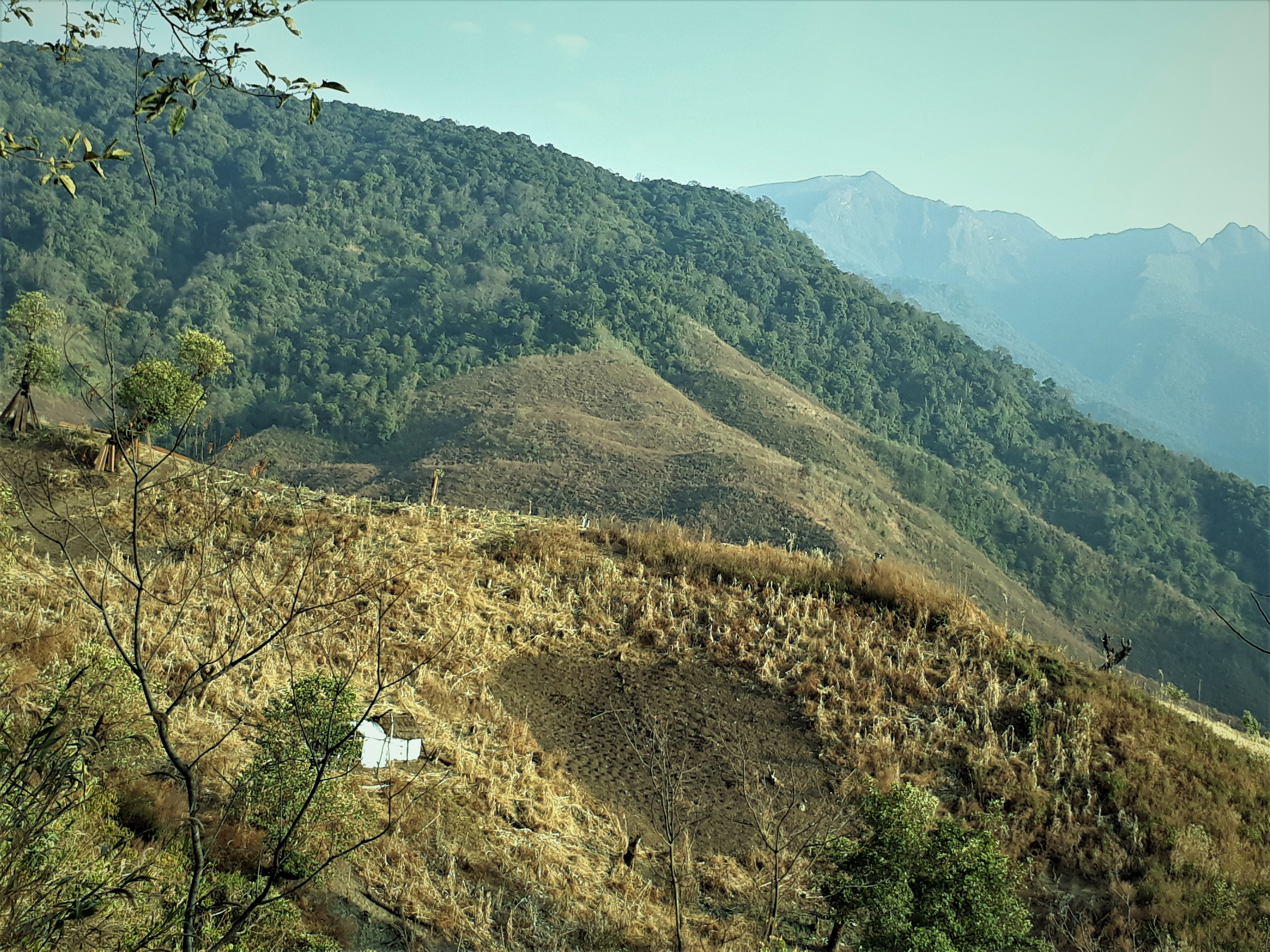
Jhum Cultivation in Kiphire district

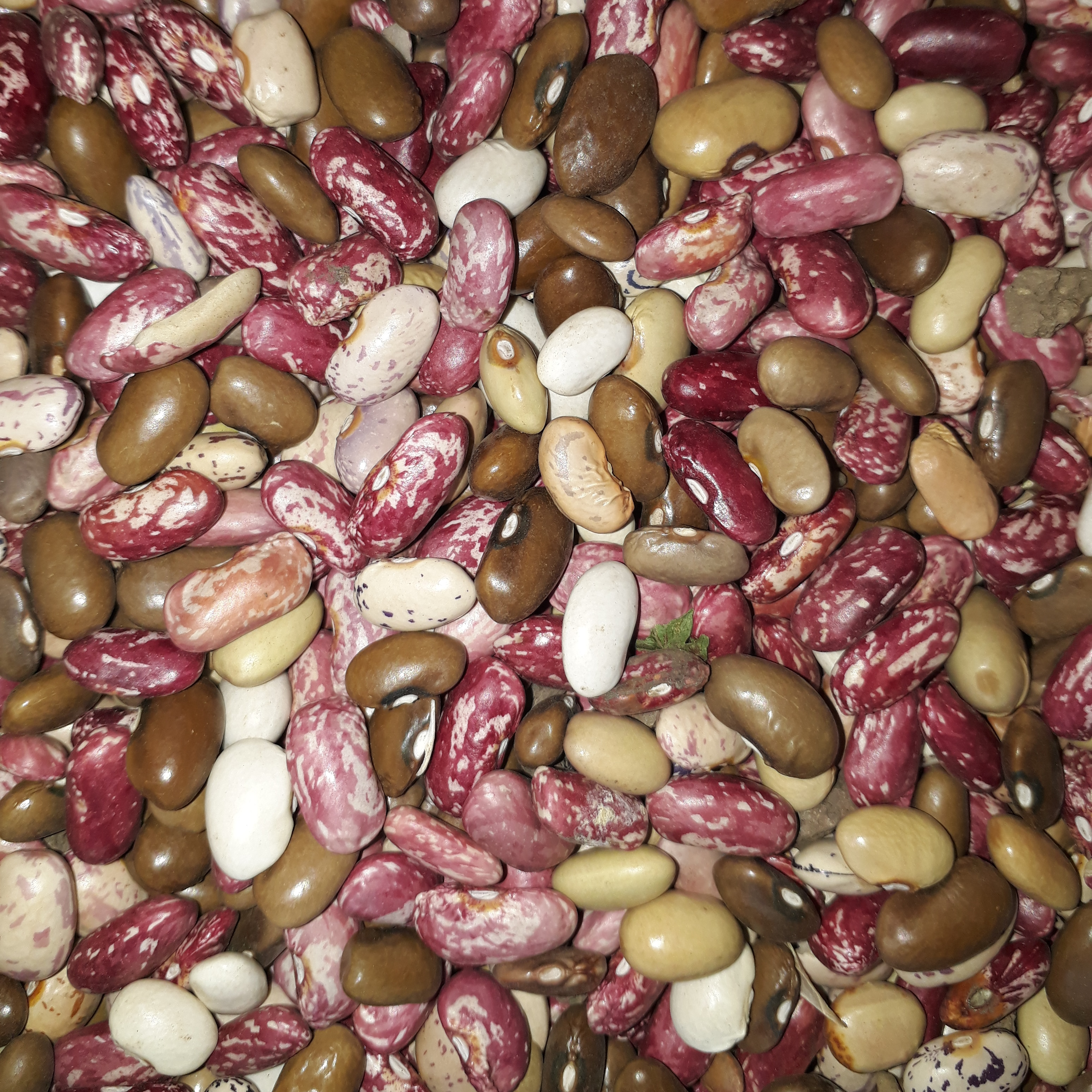
Kholar Beans of Nagaland

=== Agriculture ===
Around 70% of the population of Kiphire district is engaged in agriculture. The main agricultural system practised in the district is Shifting cultivation or Jhum cultivation. Rice, Maize, a local variety of kidney beans called Kholar and Soya beans constitutes the major crops in the jhum fields. About 32 groups of crops are widely grown in the district. Out of these, cereals such as Rice, Maize, millets are the most widely cultivated crops in terms of production and area coverage. Other crops grown are varieties of pulses and cash crops such as potatoes. Oranges. Papayas, Bananas and Pineapples are the major fruits grown throughout the district.

=== Industry ===
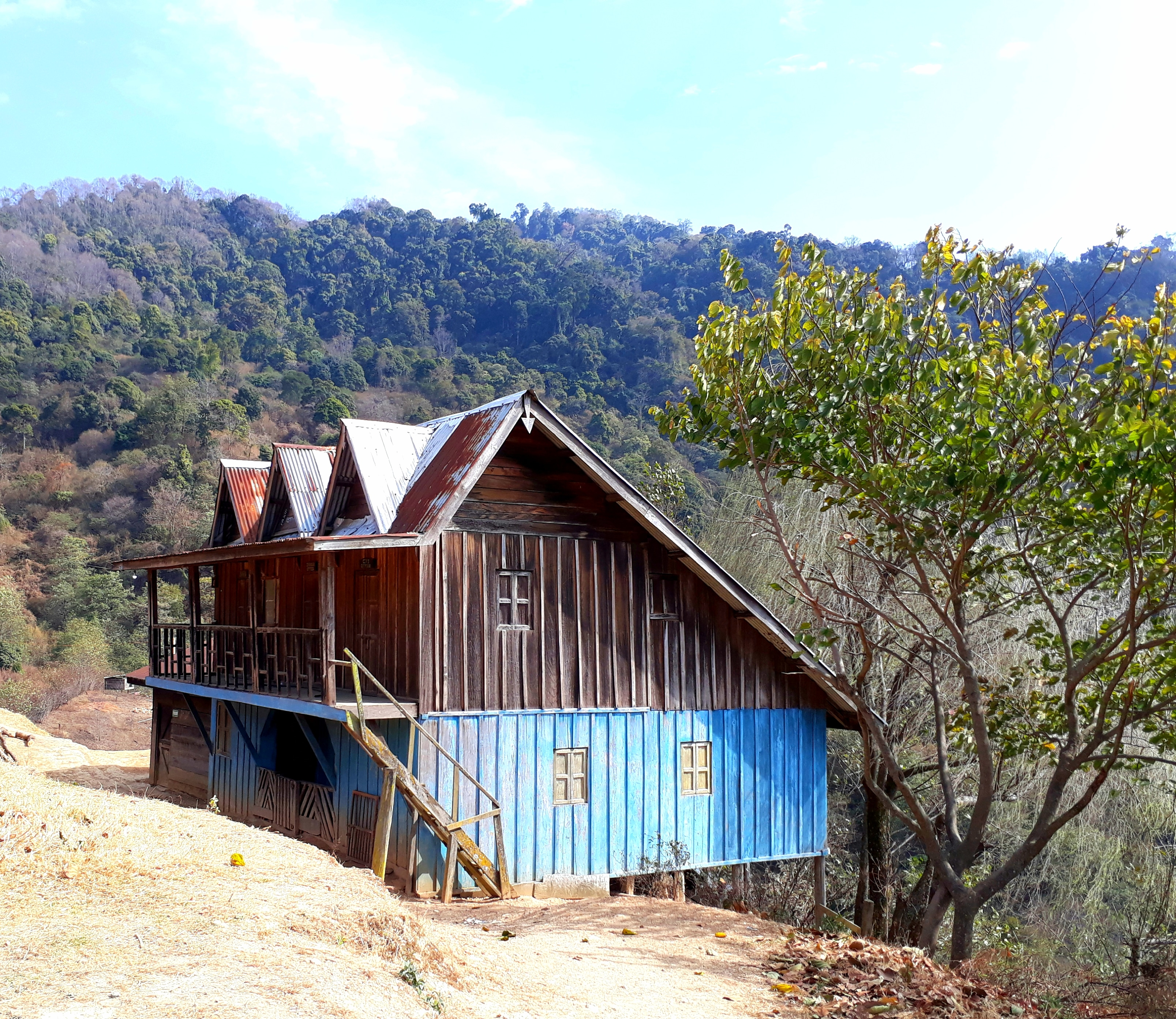
Wooden house in Fakim, Nagaland

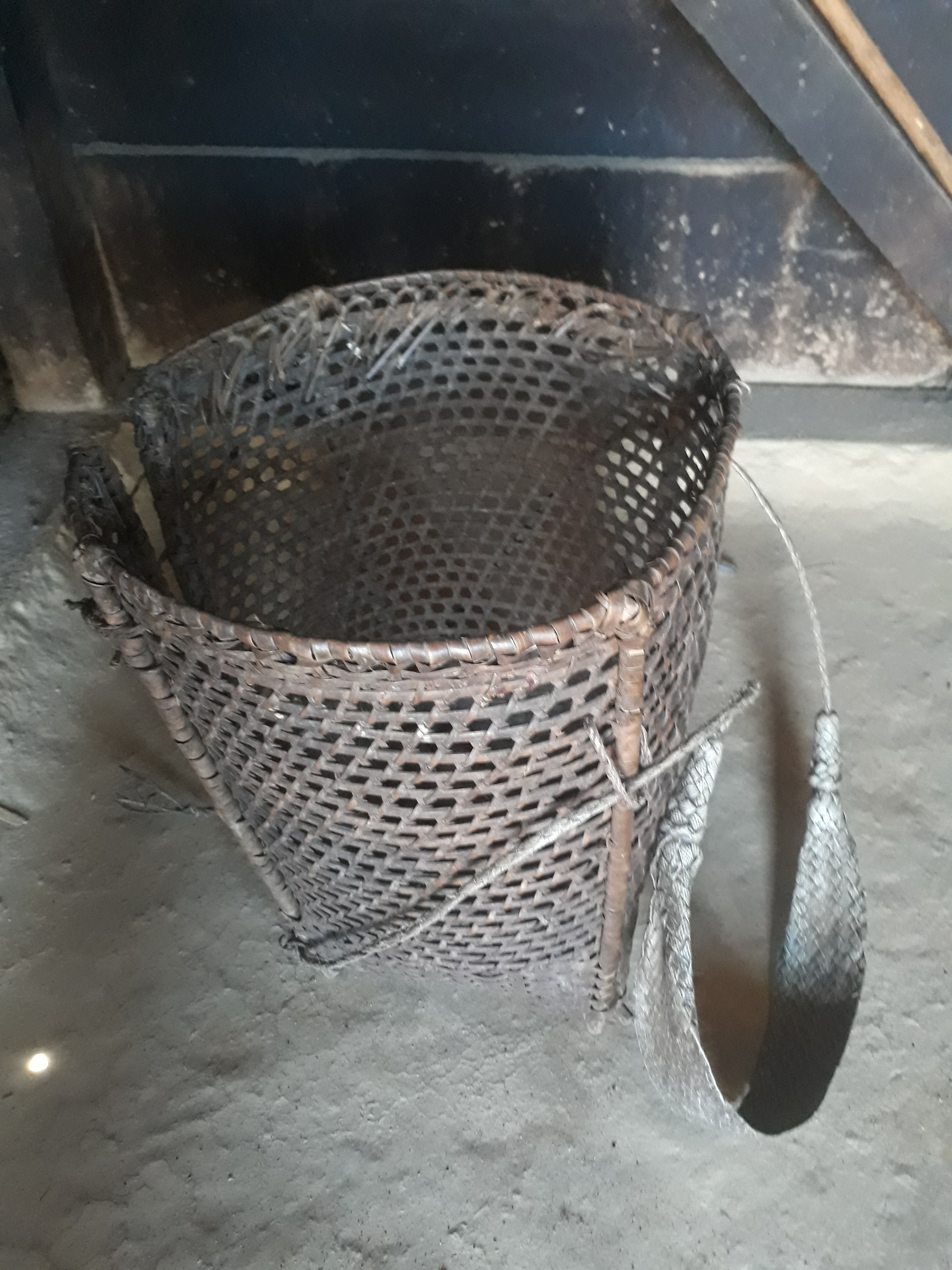
A traditional Naga basket

There are no major industries in the district. However, weaving forms the most important industry in the district. Basket weaving and Woodworking are common household industries practised by many people in Kiphire district and throughout Nagaland.

== Education ==
According to the 2011 census of India, the district has a literacy rate of 69.54%. The Scheduled Tribes have a literacy rate of 96.52%.

=== Colleges ===
- Zisaji Presidency College, Kiphire

== Tourism ==
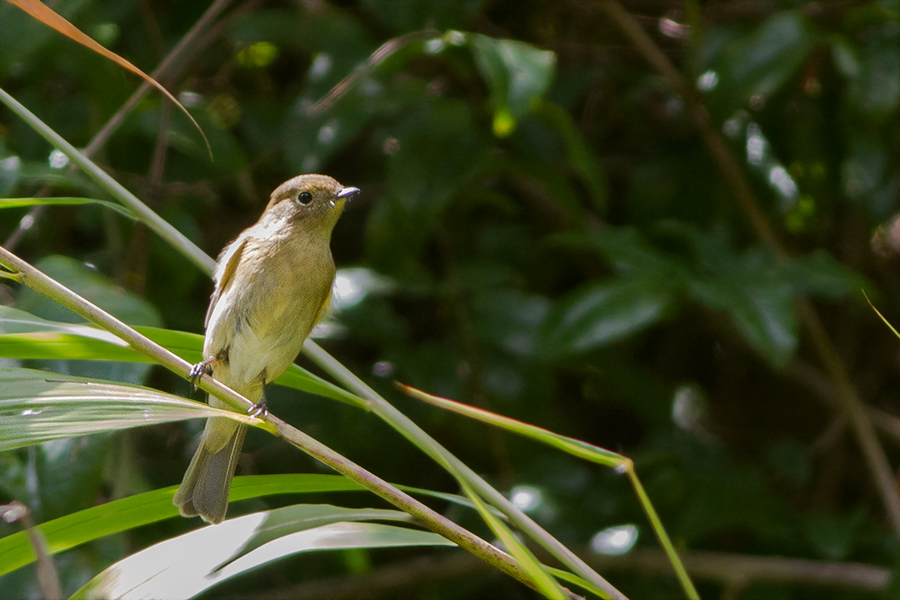
Flycatcher in Fakim, Nagaland

Tourist footfall in Kiphire district is low. Connectivity and communication infrastructure is very limited in the district. The number of tourists visiting Kiphire has seen growth in the past few years. Below are few of the tourist attractions in the district:

- Mount Saramati, peak 3,826 metres (12,552 ft)
- Limestone Caves, Salomi and Mimi villages
- Zungki River
- Fakim Wildlife Sanctuary, Fakim

The limestone caves at Salomi, Mimi and other villages in Pungro subdivision are yet to be explored. The Tizu/Zungki River is a national waterway. It was declared a national waterway in 2016.

== Transportation ==
=== Air ===
The nearest airports are Dimapur Airport and Imphal Airport located 307 and 318 kilometres from the district headquarters Kiphire. There are two helipads in the district. One is in Kiusam and the other is in Pungro.

=== Rail ===
The nearest railway station is Dimapur railway station located 313 kilometres from district headquarters Kiphire.

=== Road ===
The district is connected with roads and highways. The NH 202 passes through the district alongside other intra-district roads. Nagaland State Transport buses are available from Dimapur for Kiphire and Pungro. Private taxis can be availed as well.
