= Abdul Rashid Dar =

Indian lawyer and politician (1949–2020)

The Honourable Abdul Rashid Dar MLA, MLC
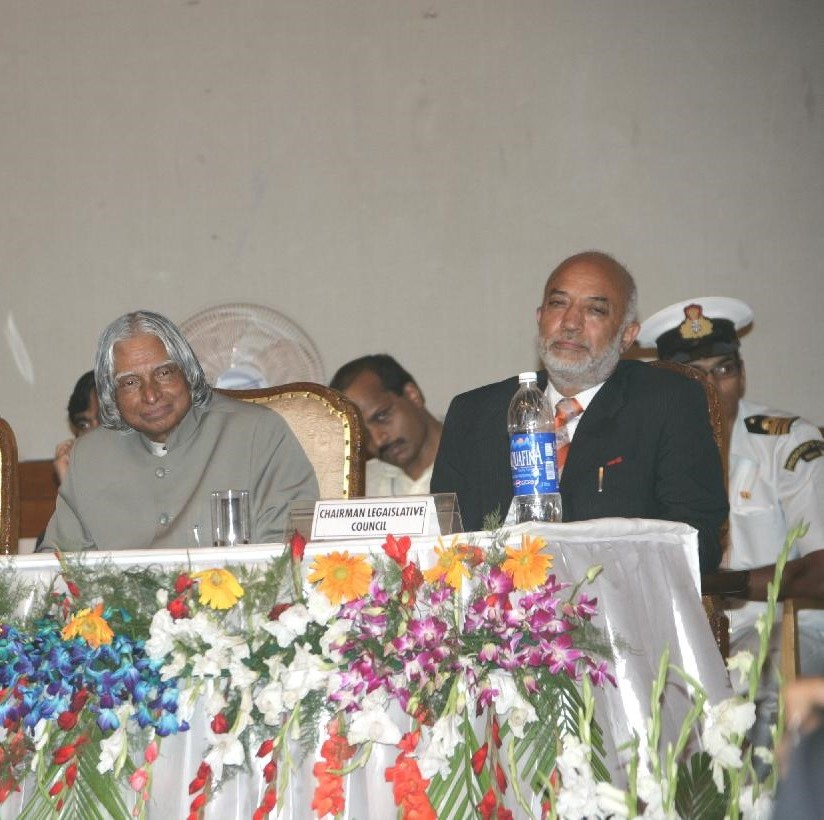
- AR Dar (right) with President of India APJ Abdul Kalam at SKICC Srinagar.

Chairman of the Jammu and Kashmir Legislative Council
- In office 2000–2008
- Governor: Girish Chandra Saxena; Srinivas Kumar Sinha; Narinder Nath Vohra
- Chief Minister: Farooq Abdullah; Mufti Mohammad Sayeed; Ghulam Nabi Azad
- Deputy: P Namgyal
- Preceded by: Himself
- Succeeded by: Ghulam Nabi Lone

Member of Commonwealth Parliamentary Association
- In office 2001–2007
- Patron: Queen Elizabeth II
- Secretary-General: Dennis Marshall; Arthur R. Donahoe; William Shija
- Elected from: Asia

Deputy Chairman of the Jammu and Kashmir Legislative Council
- In office 1997–2000

Member of Jammu and Kashmir Legislative Assembly
- In office 1987–1990
- Governor: Jagmohan
- Chief Minister: Farooq Abdullah
- Preceded by: Maqbool Dar
- Succeeded by: Abdul Majid
- Constituency: Shangus

Member of Jammu and Kashmir Legislative Council
- In office 1996–2002
- In office 2002–2008

Personal details
- Born: 13 April 1949
- Died: 28 February 2020 (aged 70) Srinagar, India
- Party: Jammu Kashmir National Conference

Abdul Rashid Dar (unknown – 28 February 2020) was a politician from Jammu & Kashmir. He was Member of the Legislative Assembly and served as the Chairman of the Jammu and Kashmir Legislative Council.

== Political career ==
Dar started his career with the J&K National Conference (JKNC) in 1987 when he contested the state assembly election from Shangus, Anantnag. In the election Dar was put up against the incumbent Congress MLA Maqbool Dar, who served as the Home Minister (Mos) of India and former minister Ashraf Khan. Dar won the election and was elected MLA as a member of the National Conference. He served in the state assembly till 1990 when the assembly was dissolved. Later on in 1996, Dar was elected to the upper house the Legislative Council of the state. During his initial term, he was nominated as the Vice Chairman of the Council, and two years later was elected as its Chairman. In 2001, he was re-elected as the Chairman as well as a member of the Legislative Council for a second term, followed by election for a third term in 2002.

=== Commonwealth Parliamentary Association ===
Abdul Rashid Dar was elected as the Regional Representative from Asia Region to the CPA Executive Committee for a period of three years at the CPA General Assembly meeting. The meetings were held in Windhoek (Namibia).

=== Legislative Council ===
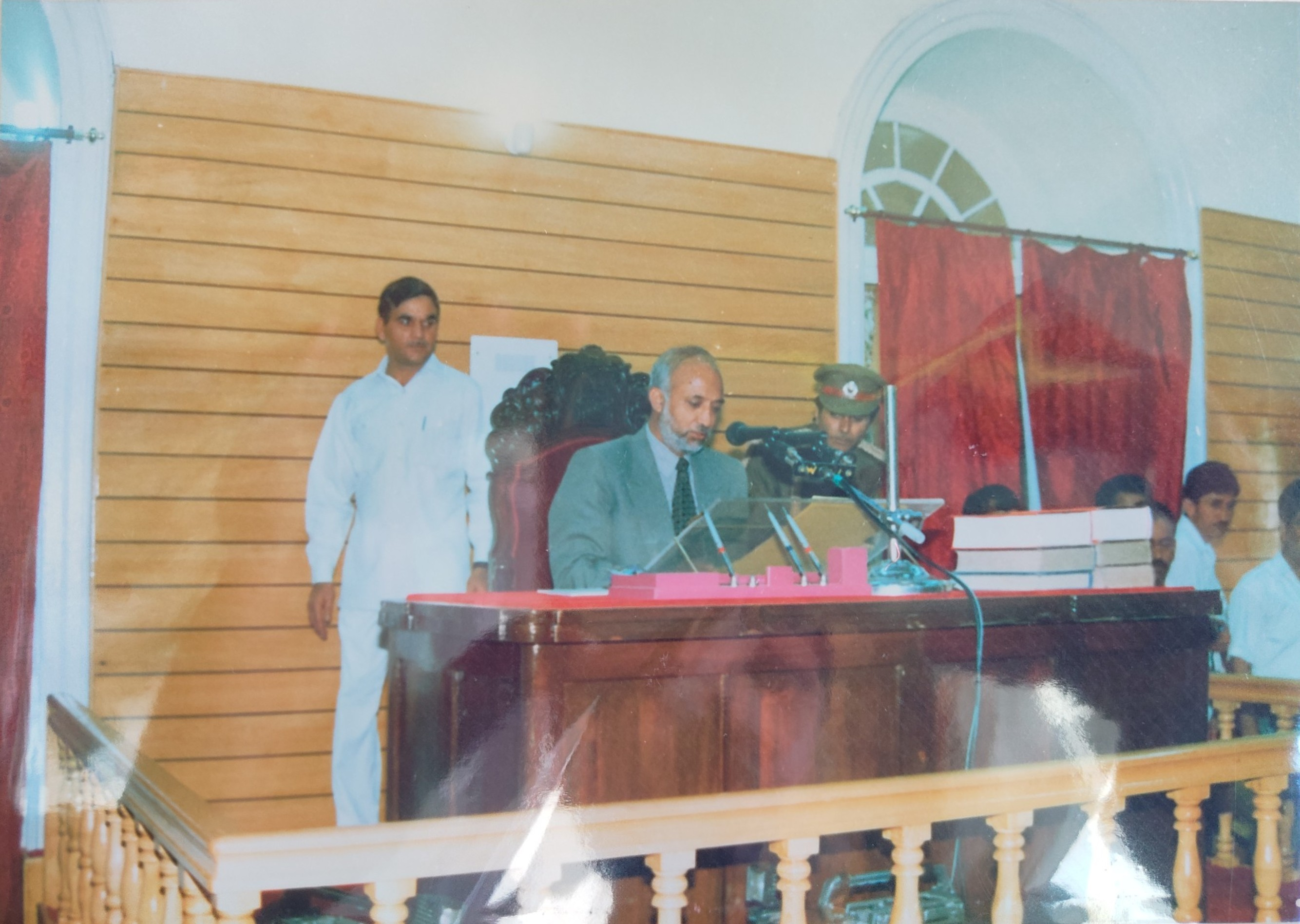
Abdul Rashid Dar as the Chairman presiding over a meeting of the J&K Legislative Council.

A.R. Dar was elected to the Jammu and Kashmir Legislative Council in 1996. Two years later, he was elected as the Deputy Chairman of the house.

=== Election as the Chairman ===
In 2001, Dar was elected as the Chairman of the J&K Legislative Council. Dar and JKNC parted ways. He remained independent while also continuing to serve as the Chairman of the Jammu and Kashmir Legislative Council.

=== No Confidence Motion ===
In 2004 a No confidence motion was moved against Dar. Deputy Chairman P Namgyal led proceedings of the house, majority of the members voted in support of Dar, after proving his support in the house he continued his term as the Chairman till 2009.

== Positions held ==
=== Public offices ===
Dar has held the following positions;

Year	Description
1987	MLA J&K Legislative Assembly
1996	Elected to J&K Legislative Council
1998	Deputy Chairman J&K Legislative Council
2001	Elected to J&K Legislative Council (2nd term)
2001	Elected to Commonwealth Parliament
2001	Chairman J&K Legislative Council
2002	Chairman J&K Legislative Council (Re-elected) 3rd Term

== Death ==
Dar died on 28 February 2020. His death was condoled by the JK National Conference. Among the leaders were former minister and founder of "Apni Party" Syed Muhammad Altaf Bukhari, former MLA Pahalgam Rafi Ahmad Mir, J&K Congress Ex-President, G.A Mir, Former Minister and ex-State Congress president, Peerzada Muhammad Sayeed, Ex MLA Shangus, Gulzar Ahmad Wani, CPI (M) leader, Mohammed Yousuf Tarigami, Hakeem Muhammad Yaseen, Ghulam Hassan Mir, Manzoor Ganie and Chairman Political Migrants Front, Sheikh Mohi-ud Din, Shabnam, expressed profound grief over his demise.
