= Srinagar Municipal Corporation =

Civic body governing Indian city of Srinagar

Type
- Type: Municipal Corporation

History
- Founded: 1886; 140 years ago

Leadership
- Municipal Commissioner: vacant
- Seats: 74

Elections
- Voting system: First past the post
- Last election: 2018
- Next election: no date conformed

Meeting place
- Srinagar, Jammu and Kashmir

Website
- smcsrinagar.in

The Srinagar Municipal Corporation is the governing body responsible for the administration of the Indian city of Srinagar. The municipal corporation system in India was established during the British colonial period with the founding of the municipal corporation in Chennai in 1688, which was later followed by the establishment of municipal corporations in Mumbai and Kolkata by 1762. The Srinagar Municipal Corporation is led by the Mayor of the city and overseen by a Commissioner.

The tenure of the Srinagar Municipal Corporation ended on 5 November 2023, and new elections are yet to be announced.

== History and administration ==
The establishment of the Srinagar Municipal Corporation aimed to enhance the town's infrastructure following the requirements of the local population.

The corporation is divided into wards, each of which is led by a councilor, with elections held every five years. The seat of Mayor at Srinagar Municipal Corporation is currently Vacant.

== Functions ==
Srinagar Municipal Corporation is created for the following functions:

- Planning for the town including its surroundings which are covered under its Department's Urban Planning Authority
- Approving construction of new buildings and authorising use of land for various purposes
- Improvement of the town's economic and Social status
- Arrangements of water supply towards commercial, residential and industrial purposes
- Planning for fire contingencies through Fire Service Departments
- Creation of solid waste management, public health system and sanitary services
- Working for the development of ecological aspect like development of Urban Forestry and making guidelines for environmental protection
- Working for the development of weaker sections of the society like mentally and physically handicapped, old age and gender biased people
- Making efforts for improvement of slums and poverty removal in the town

== Revenue sources ==
The following are the Income sources for the Corporation from the Central and State Government.

=== Revenue from taxes ===
Following is the Tax related revenue for the corporation.

- Property tax.
- Profession tax.
- Entertainment tax.
- Grants from Central and State Government like Goods and Services Tax.
- Advertisement tax.

=== Revenue from non-tax sources ===
Following is the Non Tax related revenue for the corporation.

- Water usage charges.
- Fees from Documentation services.
- Rent received from municipal property.
- Funds from municipal bonds.

== Members ==
Srinagar Municipal Corporation has a total of 74 members or corporators, who are directly elected after a term of 5 years. The council is led by the Mayor. The latest elections were held 2018. Junaid Azim Mattu of the Jammu and Kashmir Apni Party was the mayor of the city of Srinagar until the term of the council expired in November 2023.

Mayor: Junaid Azim Mattu
Deputy Mayor: Parvaiz Ahmad Qadri
Ward No	Ward Name	Name of Corporator	Party
1	Harwan	Zarina Akhter	IND
2	Nishat	Sheikh Imran	IND
3	Brane	Aqib Ahmad Renzu	IND
4	Dalgate	Sumaira Akhtar	IND
5	Pantha Chowk	Mohammad Latif Mir	IND
6	Lal Chowk	Wajahat Hussain	IND
7	Rajbagh	Shaheena	INC
8	Ikhrajpora	Ghulam Nabi Bhat	IND
9	Mehjoor Nagar	Mohammad Saleem Bhat	IND
10	Natipora	Sobee Jan	INC
11	Chanpora	Farooq Ahmed Dar	INC
12	Budshah Nagar	Aijaz Rasool Bhat	IND
13	Baghat Barzulla	Naima Sara	IND
14	Rawalpora	Mohammad Ashraf Dar	JKAP
15	Hyderpora	Ashiq Hussain Bhat	IND
16	Humhuma	Naziya Yousuf	INC
17	Hamdania Colony Bemina	Zahoor Hussain Rather	INC
18	Solina	Salman Ali Sagar	JKNC
19	Aloochi Bagh	Ruqaya Gulzar	IND
20	Sheikh Dawood Colony	Mohammad Hanief Bhat	IND
21	Ziyarat Batamaloo	Shafat Gaffar	INC
22	Shaheed Gunj	Syeda	INC
23	Karan Nagar	Ashok Koul	BJP
24	Chattabal	Basharat Bin Qadir	INC
25	Qamarwari	Neelofar Khan	IND
26	Bemina East	Shamima Khan	INC
27	Bemina West	Muzaffar Ahmed Guroo	IND
28	Nundrishi Colony	Rabia Rehman	IND
29	Parimpora	Ghulam Nabi Sofi	IND
30	Zainakot	Ghulam Rasool Hajam	INC
31	Lawaypora	Fancy Jan	IND
32	Mujgund	Shahzad Ahmad Bhat	IND
33	Tankipora	Nakul Mattoo	INC
34	Syed Ali Akbar	Gulshan Bilal	INC
35	Basant Bagh	Nazir Ahmad Gilkar	BJP
36	Fateh Kadal	Ajaz Ahmad Sofi	IND
37	Munawarabad	Gulshan Abroo	IND
38	Khanqah-e-Moula	Parvaiz Ahmad Qadri	IND
39	Maharaj Gunj	Farooq Ahmad Mir	IND
40	Jamia Masjid	Saima	IND
41	Mukhdoom Sahib	Showkat Ahmad Kak	INC
42	Khawaja Bazar	Mukhtar Ahmad Dar	IND
43	Akilmir Khanyar	Sami Jan	IND
44	Rozbal	Umaan Maqbool Shera	IND
45	Daulatabad	Zubair Fayaz Dar	IND
46	Islam Yarbal	Rehana Parvaiz	JKPDP
47	Nawab Bazar	Inayat Hussain Mir	IND
48	Nawakadal	Arif Majeed Pampori	BJP
49	Safakadal	Shazia Rashid	IND
50	Rathpora	Mohammad Ashraf Bhat	IND
51	Eidgah	Mohammad Asraf Bhat	IND
52	Palapora	Fancy Ashraf	IND
53	Tarabal	Sabia Irfan	IND
54	Kawdara	Majid Rashid Shuloo	IND
55	Hawal	Nazia	IND
56	Alamgari Bazar	Tanveer Hussain Pathan	IND
57	Gilli Kadal	Arif Ahmad Baba	IND
58	Nowshara	Jameela Akhtar	IND
59	Lal Bazar	Nazir Ahmad Naikoo	IND
60	Botshah Mohalla	Danish Shafi	IND
61	Umer Colony	Afroza Akhtar	IND
62	Jogilanker	Asif Ahmad Beigh	IND
63	Kathi Darwaza	Syed Mohmmad Hussain	IND
64	Lokut Dal	Sara	INC
65	Bod Dal	Junaid Azim Mattu	JKAP
66	Hazratbal	Shabbir Ahmed	IND
67	Tailbal	Kulsuma	IND
68	Habak	Mohammad Saleem Lone	IND
69	Soura	Salman Ali Sagar	JKNC
70	Buchpora	Nazira Bano	IND
71	Ahmadnagar	Abdul Majeed Tantra	IND
72	Zakura	Abdul Wahid Dar	IND
73	Chatterhama	Hasina	INC
74	Bagh-i-Mehtab	Bashir Ahmad Mir	BJP

== See also ==
- List of municipal corporations in India
- List of mayors of Srinagar
