= Reyaz Ahmad Khan =

Indian politician

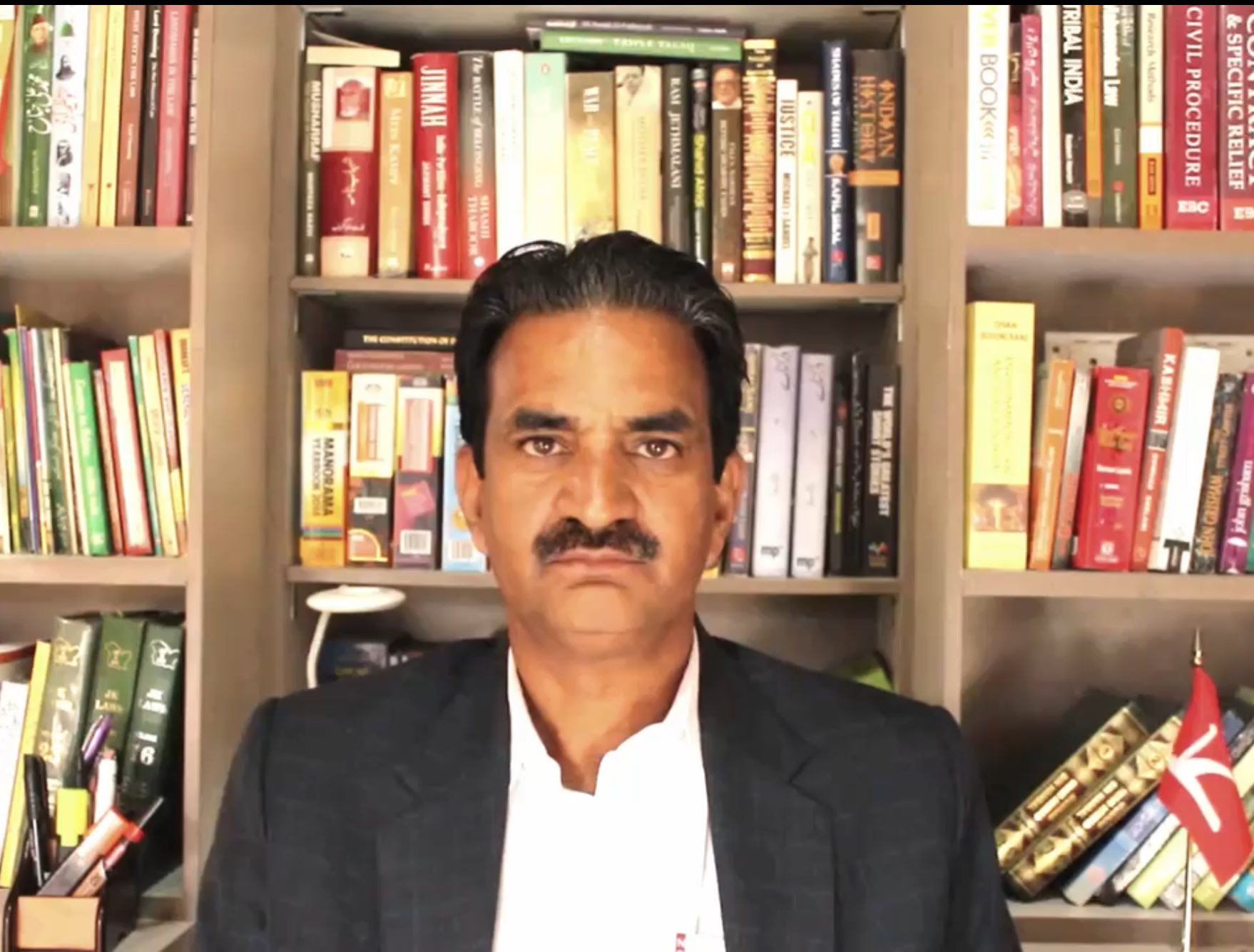

Member of Jammu and Kashmir Legislative Assembly
- Incumbent
- Assumed office 21 October 2024
- Preceded by: Gulzar Ahmad Wani
- Constituency: Shangus-Anantnag East

Personal details
- Party: Jammu & Kashmir National Conference
- Profession: Politician

Reyaz Ahmad Khan ( ریاض احمد خان) (born 10 April 1969) is an Indian politician from Jammu & Kashmir. He was elected to the Jammu & Kashmir Legislative Assembly in 2024, representing Shangus–Anantnag East Assembly constituency. He is a member of the Jammu & Kashmir National Conference party. Reyaz Ahmad Khan was previously member of House Committees on Subordinate Legislation and Privileges. In 2026, Khan was unanimously elected as the member of Committee on Public Undertakings of J&K Legislative Assembly.

== Early life ==
Khan belongs to the influential Khan dynasty of Shangus. He was born to Gull Mohd Khan and Sara Begum. Khan pursued his early schooling from a Govt School in neighbourhood. He completed his BSC from Government Degree College Khanabal and later did LLB from University of Kashmir.

== Career ==
He began his legal practice in the 1990s at the District Court in Anantnag and later extended his practice to the Jammu and Kashmir High Court, building a legal career spanning more than 28 years. He is regarded as the most established and renowned Lawyer of Anantnag.

Khan served as standing counsel for the Government of India for five years. He also served as president of the Anantnag Bar Association for two years and continues to serve as legal counsel for Bharat Sanchar Nigam Limited (BSNL).

=== Politics ===
Khan has been politically active since he joined the Bar Association. His peers honored him with the title "Voice of the Voiceless" for his advocacy. Khan is considered to be a close confidant of Abdullahs.

In 2014, Khan officially became a member of the Jammu and Kashmir National Conference (JKNC) and was given the mandate to contest the assembly elections from Shangus, Anantnag. Although he lost, he secured approximately 11,000 votes.

Khan remained an active member of JKNC and is credited with playing a significant role in the party’s success in winning the Anantnag parliamentary seat twice. In 2024, he defeated four-time MLA and former minister by a margin of 18,000 votes, securing over 30,000 votes in total.

At present Khan is Vice President South Zone, comprising four districts of Anantnag, Kulgam, Pulwama and Shopian. Khan previously served as South Zone Secretary of Jammu and Kashmir National Conference.

== Issues Raised ==
1) Dradpora-Choidraman Tunnel and Achabal-Shangus-Inderwal National Highway: The foremost issue that Reyaz Ahmad Khan raised was that of Dradpora Choidraman Tunnel connecting Marwah Valley in Kistwar to Anantnag therby providing an all weather road connectivity to the far flung area. MLA Shangus Reyaz Ahmad Khan is the pioneer of the idea of Achabal-Shangus Highway as an approach road to the Tunnel. Reyaz Ahmad Khan has also met CM Omar Abdullah in this regard and has submitted a memorandum to CM. CM Omar Abdullah wrote to Union Road Minister Nitin Gadkari who assured of active consideration of the Project. If this Project gets through, it will prove a magic wand for the area as it would not only connect Marwah to Anantnag but would increase Tourism potential of the area.

2) SDH Shangus: Reyaz Ahmad Khan vociferously advocated for the restoration of consultant posts at SDH Shangus both inside and outside assembly. In the Board meeting held at Anantnag, CM Omar Abdullah directed for early restoration of posts after demand was raised by Reyaz Ahmad Khan.

3) Service Bond for Doctors: Reyaz Ahmad Khan proposed a service bond mandating postgraduate doctors to serve in rural areas to address healthcare shortages.

4) Seer Nambal Bridge and its approach road.

5) Forest Rights Issue: Reyaz Ahmad Khan strongly criticised the demarcation drive of Forest department launched for eviction of tribal in July 2026. Khan’s continuous opposition and efforts bore fruits when J&K Govt officially halted drive by enforcing the provisions of Forest Rights Act, 2006.

6) New Building for SDH Seer.

7) Water Source Issue: MLA Shangus raised the issue for availability of source of water for Kehribal and adjoining areas.

8) Solid Waste Management: MLA Shangus Anantnag East raised pressing issue relating to solid waste management in his constituency. Minutes after the issue was raised in assembly, Rural Development Department swung into action and cleared several locations which were turned into dumping sites.

== Personal life ==
Reyaz Ahmad Khan is married and has two sons.

== See also ==
- 2024 Jammu & Kashmir Legislative Assembly election
- Jammu and Kashmir Legislative Assembly
