= Hawks' Club =

Cambridge University social club

- The front door of The Hawks' Club
- Location: Cambridge, United Kingdom
- Founded: 1872
- Membership: Blues, Half Blues
- University: University of Cambridge
- Colours: Maroon & Gold
- Website: www.hawksclub.co.uk

Notable members
- King Charles III; Rob Andrew; Mike Atherton; Chris Brasher; Gavin Hastings

The Hawks' Club, founded in 1872, is a members-only social club for the leading sportsmen at the University of Cambridge. Membership is by election only, and the usual criterion is that the candidate should have his Blue. Many notable individuals have been, or are, members, including King George VI, King Charles III, Rob Andrew, Mike Atherton, Chris Brasher, Gavin Hastings and Hugh Laurie.

== History ==
The Hawks' Club was formed in 1872 when a proposal to allow members of other colleges into the St John's College Eagles sporting club was rejected. This led to the Hawks' being established as an equivalent club for the whole university. In its early history, it was primarily a cricket club but, by the turn of the century, other sports had become well represented.

As is common with student-run organisations, records are patchy in places and old lists of presidents and members have long been lost. The record is better for the period 1889–1963, as during this time a picture of each year's president was added to a display in the clubhouse and these have survived to the present day. During the 1950s a number of subsequently notable sportsmen were presidents, and several are listed below.

It is not known whether participation in a Varsity Match was originally a prerequisite for membership; some early presidents do not appear to have competed against Oxford in any sport. However, the personal 'suitability' of candidates for membership does not appear to have changed since the Club was founded. Candidates must have excelled at their sport on behalf of the university and also be clubbable. Dr Whitehorn, Treasurer of the Club from 1941 to 1960, remarked that beside the many Olympians, internationals and sporting greats who are members, ‘the stout fellows who don’t get Blues, but have been and are the making of the University’s fellowship in sport and life – those are the Hawks too. Long may they flourish’.

The club plays host not only to the Members in residence, but also to visiting All Blacks, Springboks, Samoans – whose height and bulk test the dimensions of the bar – oarsmen, Vincent’s members and also to judges, doctors, parsons, accountants, schoolmasters, knights and lords, captains of industry, farmers, MPs and Heads of Houses who return for ‘auld lang syne’.

== Membership ==
=== Eligibility criteria ===
Application for membership is open to any man who is either a member of any college at the University of Cambridge or who has been admitted ad eundem to the university. He must have spent at least one term in residence, and should have earned a Full Blue, Half Blue or Second Team Colours (in a full blue sport) by representing the university against Oxford in a Varsity Match.

=== Election process ===
A prospective applicant must be proposed, seconded, and have six further members sign their application form. The proposer is normally the team captain for the relevant sport and the seconder must be a member of the Hawks' Committee. The application is then reviewed by the committee: two "no" votes will reject an applicant, and he may not be proposed again at a later date.

Members are admitted for life and may wear the club colours of maroon and gold. The number of Hawks-in-residence at the university is limited to 250, not including MAs; there are several thousand members worldwide.

Occasionally, individuals are admitted as an Honorary Hawk without fulfilling the above criteria (for example Prince Philip, Duke of Edinburgh, who did not study at Cambridge).

=== Dining Rights Club ===
Since 1993, individuals have also been elected to The Hawks Dining Rights Club. Members may use the clubhouse, but do not become Hawks. Neither the Cambridge-only nor the men-only restrictions apply in this case, and the majority of Dining Rights members are local business people and professionals who contribute to the costs of running the Club, and to The Hawks’ Trust which is a charity supporting all sportsmen and women at the university. There are slightly fewer dining rights members than Hawks-in-residence, and the number peaked at 160 in 1998.

== Committee ==
The Club's Committee consists of a President, Honorary Secretary, Junior Treasurer and seven ordinary members, and is elected each academic year by the Hawks-in-residence. The Committee are responsible for the Club, the election of new members and host an event each June during May Week in the style of a Cambridge May Ball, known as "The Hawks' Event", at Fenner's Cricket Ground.

There is a Management Committee of the Trustees, the President and the Secretary of the Club, the Steward and the DRC President, who guide the Club's development.

The London Dinner Committee, made up of former presidents and notable old Hawks, organise the London Dinner at the end of Michaelmas Term. This is hosted at the Savoy Hotel and is the major event in the calendar for Hawks once they have gone down.

The Hawks' Charitable Trust actively supports students who have financial difficulties keeping up their sport. Each year the Club awards a number of bursaries to members of the university under the auspices of the Hawks' Charitable Trust. These awards are equally available to both men and women, and total around £40,000 each year.

== Clubhouse ==
The dining room laid for lunch.

The clubhouse was originally on Trinity Street, but by the 1890s it had moved to a St John's College property in All Saints' Passage. It remained there until 1966 when financial troubles meant the property had to be sold, despite surviving through both world wars, during which the Club was closed. After this, it briefly occupied the same premises as the Pitt Club, until conflicts of interest regarding the differing objectives of the two clubs made this no longer possible.

There was no clubhouse until 1986 when a four-storey building at 18 Portugal Place became available. This property was bought by a group of members, who restored it from its previous existence as a dilapidated hotel staff hostel. The restored clubhouse was opened by the Duke of Edinburgh in October 1992. It consists of a bar, members' lounge, dining room space for some 25-30 people, and the Club steward's flat on the top floor.

Resident Hawks voted in advisory votes in 2017 (85% in favour) and January 2019 (89% in favour) on the question of allowing resident Ospreys (Cambridge women's sports club) to pay for access arrangements to the Hawks’ clubhouse. 1,400 non-resident Hawks (out of 4,480 members) voted 89% in favour of the proposal in an online ballot run by Electoral Reform Services in February and March 2019.

== Notable members ==
Looking down the staircase at the Club's premises on Portugal Place.

Monarchs:

- King George VI, CULTC
- King Charles III, CUPC

Members of the Royal Family:

- Prince Henry, Duke of Gloucester, CUPC
- Louis Mountbatten, 1st Earl Mountbatten of Burma, CUPC
- Prince Philip, Duke of Edinburgh
- Antony Armstrong-Jones, 1st Earl of Snowdon - Former husband of Princess Margaret, CUBC

Academic:

- Matthew Bullock - Master of St Edmund's College, CUAC
- John Butterfield, Baron Butterfield - Vice-Chancellor of the University of Nottingham (1971-1975) and University of Cambridge (1983-1985), Master of Downing College 1978-1987, CURUFC, CUCC, CULTC, CURTC, CUHC
- R. K. von Goldstein - Headmaster of the Bishop Cotton School, India
- Dennis Silk - First Class cricketer, former MCC President and Warden of Radley College, CUCC, CURUFC

Politics & Law:

- Sir Ralph Kilner Brown - High Court Judge, WWII Brigadier, CUAC
- James Crowden - Lord Lieutenant of Cambridgeshire, Vice-President of the British Olympic Association and Steward of Henley Royal Regatta, CUBC
- Sir Peter Studd - 643rd Lord Mayor of London; CUCC, CURUFC
- William Whitelaw - Conservative MP, Deputy Prime Minister of the United Kingdom, 1983–88; CUGC

Business:

- Karan Bilimoria, Baron Bilimoria - Founder of Cobra Beer Ltd, CUPC
- Sir Adrian Cadbury - Businessman, CUBC, CUSSC

Arts:

- Hugh Laurie - Actor, CUBC

Sportsmen:

- Rob Andrew - England rugby international 1985-1997, CURUFC, CUCC
- Mike Atherton - England Cricket Captain 1993-1998, CUCC
- Bunny Austin - Davis Cup Winner and Wimbledon, Roland-Garros Finalist, CULTC
- Mark Bailey - England rugby international and High Master of St Paul's School, CURUFC
- Trevor Bailey - England cricketer 1949-1959, CUCC
- Mike Biggar - Scotland Rugby Captain, CURUFC
- Henry Blofeld - Cricket commentator, CUCC
- Chris Brasher - Olympic Gold 1956, CUAC
- Mike Brearley - England Cricket Captain, CUCC
- Godfrey Brown - Olympic Gold 1936, CUAC
- Eddie Butler - Welsh rugby international, journalist and broadcaster, CURUFC
- Bernie Cotton - GB hockey international and Olympic Gold winning coach, CUHC
- Mark Cox - Davis Cup finalist, Australian and US Open quarter-finalist, CULTC
- James Cracknell - Olympic Gold 2000 & 2004, CUBC
- John Crawley - England cricketer, CUCC
- Freddie Davidson - World and European Rowing Champion, CUBC
- Ted Dexter - England Cricket Captain 1961/2-1963 & 1964, former MCC President, CUCC
- Richard Dodds - Olympic Gold 1988, GB Hockey Captain, CUHC
- Toby Flood - England rugby international, CURUFC
- Tom George - Olympic Bronze 2020, CUBC
- Mike Gibson - Irish rugby international, CURUFC
- Gavin Hastings - Scotland Rugby Captain, CURUFC
- Alastair Hignell - England rugby international and First Class cricketer, CURUFC. CUCC
- James Horwill - Australian Rugby Captain, CURUFC
- Tom James - Olympic Gold 2008 & 2012, CUBC
- John Lecky - Chairman of Canada 3000 airline, Olympic Silver 1960, CUBC, CURUFC
- Tony Lewis - England Cricket Captain 1972/3, Presenter BBC Cricket 1980 - 1999, CUCC, CURUFC
- Douglas Lowe - Olympic Gold 1924 & 1928 - CUAC
- Laddie Lucas - Distinguished wartime RAF pilot, MP, International golfer, CUGC
- George Mann - England Cricket Captain 1948/9-1949, CUCC
- Christopher Martin-Jenkins - Cricket commentator, CUCC, CURFC
- Peter May - England Cricket captain 1955-1959/60 & 1961, CUCC
- Richard Meade - Triple Olympic Gold 1968 & 1972, CURC
- George Nash - Olympic Gold 2016, Bronze 2012, CUBC
- Derek Pringle - England cricketer and journalist, CUCC
- John Pritchard - Olympic Silver 1980, CUBC
- Tom Ransley - Olympic Gold 2016, Bronze 2012, CUBC
- Jamie Roberts - Welsh rugby international, CURUFC
- David Sheppard - Bishop of Liverpool, England Cricket captain 1954, CUCC
- Ken Scotland - Scotland rugby player, CURUFC
- Tom Stallard - Olympic Silver medallist 2008 and motorsport engineer, CUBC
- Ed Smith - England cricketer and journalist, CUCC
- Adie Spencer - First man to win Rugby Union and League Blues, banned by the RFU for playing League at a professional level, CURLFC, CURUFC
- Bob Tisdall - Irish Olympic Gold medallist 1932, CUAC
- Bruce Tulloh - Olympian and European Champion, CUAC
- Tony Underwood - England rugby international 1992-1998, CURUFC, CUAC
- Flip van der Merwe - South African rugby international, CURUFC
- Josh West - Olympic Silver medallist 2008, CUBC
- Kieran West - Olympic Gold medallist 2000, CUBC
- Max Woosnam - Britain's Greatest Sportsman, Olympic Gold and Silver medallist 1920, Wimbledon Champion, Davis Cup captain, England and Manchester City F.C. captain, CUAFC, CUCC, CULTC, CURTC, CUGC
- Oliver Wynne-Griffith - Olympic Bronze 2020, CUBC

== See also ==
- University Sporting Blue
- The Boat Race
- Varsity Match
- Vincent’s Club, the closest equivalent club at Oxford University

== Bibliography ==
- The Hawk, editors Kolbert, C. and Hyde, A., No. 9 (October 2005), published by The Hawks Club.
- Rules of the Hawks' Club (May 2003).
