= Ralph Goldstein =

Ralph Goldstein may refer to:

- Ralph Goldstein (fencer) (1913–1997), American Olympic fencer
- Ralph Goldstein (politician) (1921–1986), member of the New York State Assembly

== See also ==
- R. K. von Goldstein (Ralph Kenneth von Goldstein, 1909–1979), Indian educationist
