= Shangus–Anantnag East Assembly constituency =

Constituency of the Jammu and Kashmir Legislative Assembly

Coordinates: 33.70°N 75.28°E

Shangus–Ananatnag East
- Constituency No. 46 for the Jammu and Kashmir Legislative Assembly

Constituency details
- Country: India
- State: Jammu and Kashmir
- District: Anantnag
- Lok Sabha constituency: Anantnag-Rajouri
- Established: 2022

Member of Legislative Assembly
- Incumbent Reyaz Ahmad Khan
- Party: Jammu and Kashmir National Conference

Shangus–Anantnag East Assembly constituency is one of the 90 constituencies in the Jammu and Kashmir Legislative Assembly of Jammu and Kashmir a north state of India. Shangus is also part of Anantnag-Rajouri Lok Sabha constituency.

== Members of the Legislative Assembly ==
Election	Member	Party
As Shangus
1977	Mohammed Ashraf Khan	Jammu & Kashmir National Conference
1983	Mohammed Maqbool Dar	Indian National Congress
1987	Abdul Rashid Dar	Jammu & Kashmir National Conference
1996	Abdul Majeed Mir	Jammu & Kashmir National Conference
2002	Peer Mohammed Hussain	Jammu and Kashmir People's Democratic Party
2008	Peerzada Mansoor Hussain	Jammu and Kashmir People's Democratic Party
2014	Gulzar Ahmad Wani	Indian National Congress
Shangus–Anantnag East
2024	Reyaz Ahmad Khan	Jammu and Kashmir National Conference

== Election results ==
=== Assembly Election 2024 ===
2024 Jammu and Kashmir Legislative Assembly election : Shangus–Anantnag East
Party	Candidate	Votes	%	±%
JKNC	Reyaz Ahmad Khan	30,345	52.32%	New
JKPDP	Abdul Rehman Bhat	15,813	27.27%	New
BJP	Vir Ji Saraf	1,988	3.43%	New
Independent	Faizan Rahi	1,980	3.41%	New
NOTA	None of the Above	1,905	3.28%	New
Independent	Sheikh Zafarrulah	1,363	2.35%	New
JKAP	Maharaj Krishan Yogi	1,162	2.00%	New
Independent	Imtiyaz Ahmad Rather	923	1.59%	New
Independent	Rawoof Ahmad Padder	776	1.34%	New
Independent	Reyaz Majid Sofi	625	1.08%	New
NLP	Irshad Ahmad Malik	578	1.00%	New
Margin of victory		14,532	25.06%	
Turnout		57,994	57.48%	
Registered electors		1,00,902		
JKNC win (new seat)				

=== Assembly Election 2014 ===
2014 Jammu and Kashmir Legislative Assembly election : Shangus
Party	Candidate	Votes	%	±%
INC	Gulzar Ahmad Wani	21,085	37.08%	▲11.98
JKPDP	Peerzada Mansoor Hussain	18,896	33.23%	▲5.24
JKNC	Reyaz Ahmad Khan	10,892	19.15%	▲10.63
BJP	Khalid Muzaffar Maqbool Dar	2,275	4.00%	New
Independent	Tanveer Hussain Khan	1,240	2.18%	New
NOTA	None of the Above	591	1.04%	New
Independent	Mohammad Yousuf Ganie	563	0.99%	New
RPI(A)	Mushtaq Ahmad Bhat	561	0.99%	▼0.54
Independent	Bashir Ahmad Wani	435	0.76%	New
Margin of victory		2,189	3.85%	▲0.96
Turnout		56,866	68.77%	▼0.52
Registered electors		82,689		▲15.76
INC gain from JKPDP		Swing	▲9.09	

=== Assembly Election 2008 ===
2008 Jammu and Kashmir Legislative Assembly election : Shangus
Party	Candidate	Votes	%	±%
JKPDP	Peerzada Mansoor Hussain	13,853	27.99%	▼9.08
INC	Gulzar Ahmad Wani	12,423	25.10%	▼9.50
Independent	Abdul Rashid Dar	7,144	14.43%	New
JKNC	Mohammed Syed Khan	4,217	8.52%	▼10.05
People's Democratic Front (Jammu and Kashmir)	Imtiyaz Ahmad Rather	3,456	6.98%	New
Independent	Abdul Majeed Mir	2,645	5.34%	New
RPI(A)	Mushtaq Ahmad Bhat	756	1.53%	New
LJP	Abdul Hamid Rishi	672	1.36%	▼2.10
SP	Mohammed Amin	647	1.31%	New
Independent	Mohammed Iqbal Mir	640	1.29%	New
Margin of victory		1,430	2.89%	▲0.42
Turnout		49,495	69.29%	▲43.89
Registered electors		71,429		▲31.50
JKPDP hold		Swing	▼9.08	

=== Assembly Election 2002 ===
2002 Jammu and Kashmir Legislative Assembly election : Shangus
Party	Candidate	Votes	%	±%
JKPDP	Peer Mohammed Hussain	5,115	37.07%	New
INC	Gulzar Ahmad Wani	4,774	34.60%	▲23.08
JKNC	Abdul Majeed Mir	2,563	18.57%	▼25.98
LJP	Abdul Hamid Rishi	477	3.46%	New
BJP	Habib -Ul- Rahman	302	2.19%	▲0.45
Independent	Abdul Rashid Naik	299	2.17%	New
SAP	Rahmatullah Khan	269	1.95%	New
Margin of victory		341	2.47%	▼1.66
Turnout		13,799	25.40%	▼25.39
Registered electors		54,319		▲14.84
JKPDP gain from JKNC		Swing	▼7.48	

=== Assembly Election 1996 ===
1996 Jammu and Kashmir Legislative Assembly election : Shangus
Party	Candidate	Votes	%	±%
JKNC	Abdul Majeed Mir	10,703	44.55%	▲0.58
JD	Gowhar Maqbool	9,710	40.42%	New
INC	Gulzar Ahmad Wani	2,768	11.52%	New
JKAL	Abdul Rashid Misgar	426	1.77%	New
BJP	Molvi Habib-Ul-Rehman	418	1.74%	New
Margin of victory		993	4.13%	▼14.48
Turnout		24,025	52.35%	▼28.98
Registered electors		47,298		▲16.16
JKNC hold		Swing	▲0.58	

=== Assembly Election 1987 ===
1987 Jammu and Kashmir Legislative Assembly election : Shangus
Party	Candidate	Votes	%	±%
JKNC	Abdul Rashid Dar	14,283	43.97%	▼2.07
Independent	Jamseed Ghulam Mohammed	8,237	25.36%	New
Independent	Mohammed Maqbool Dar	6,996	21.54%	New
Independent	Mohammed Ashraf Khan	2,795	8.60%	New
Margin of victory		6,046	18.61%	▲13.81
Turnout		32,485	81.38%	▼0.43
Registered electors		40,719		▲15.28
JKNC gain from INC		Swing	▼6.87	

=== Assembly Election 1983 ===
1983 Jammu and Kashmir Legislative Assembly election : Shangus
Party	Candidate	Votes	%	±%
INC	Mohammed Maqbool	14,403	50.84%	▲32.07
JKNC	Mohammed Ashraf Khan	13,042	46.03%	▼24.18
Independent	Peer Wali Ullah	886	3.13%	New
Margin of victory		1,361	4.80%	▼46.64
Turnout		28,331	81.96%	▲6.50
Registered electors		35,323		▲17.41
INC gain from JKNC		Swing		

=== Assembly Election 1977 ===
1977 Jammu and Kashmir Legislative Assembly election : Shangus
Party	Candidate	Votes	%	±%
JKNC	Mohammed Ashraf Khan	15,568	70.21%	New
INC	Mohammed Maqbool	4,162	18.77%	New
JP	Abdul Rashid Dar	2,185	9.85%	New
Independent	Bashit Anmad Khan	258	1.16%	New
Margin of victory		11,406	51.44%	
Turnout		22,173	77.62%	
Registered electors		30,085		
JKNC win (new seat)				

== See also ==
- Shangus
- List of constituencies of Jammu and Kashmir Legislative Assembly
