= Peer Mohammed Hussain =

Indian politician; former minister of Jammu and Kashmir

Peer Mohammed Hussain Soharvardi
- پیر محمد حسین سوہوردی
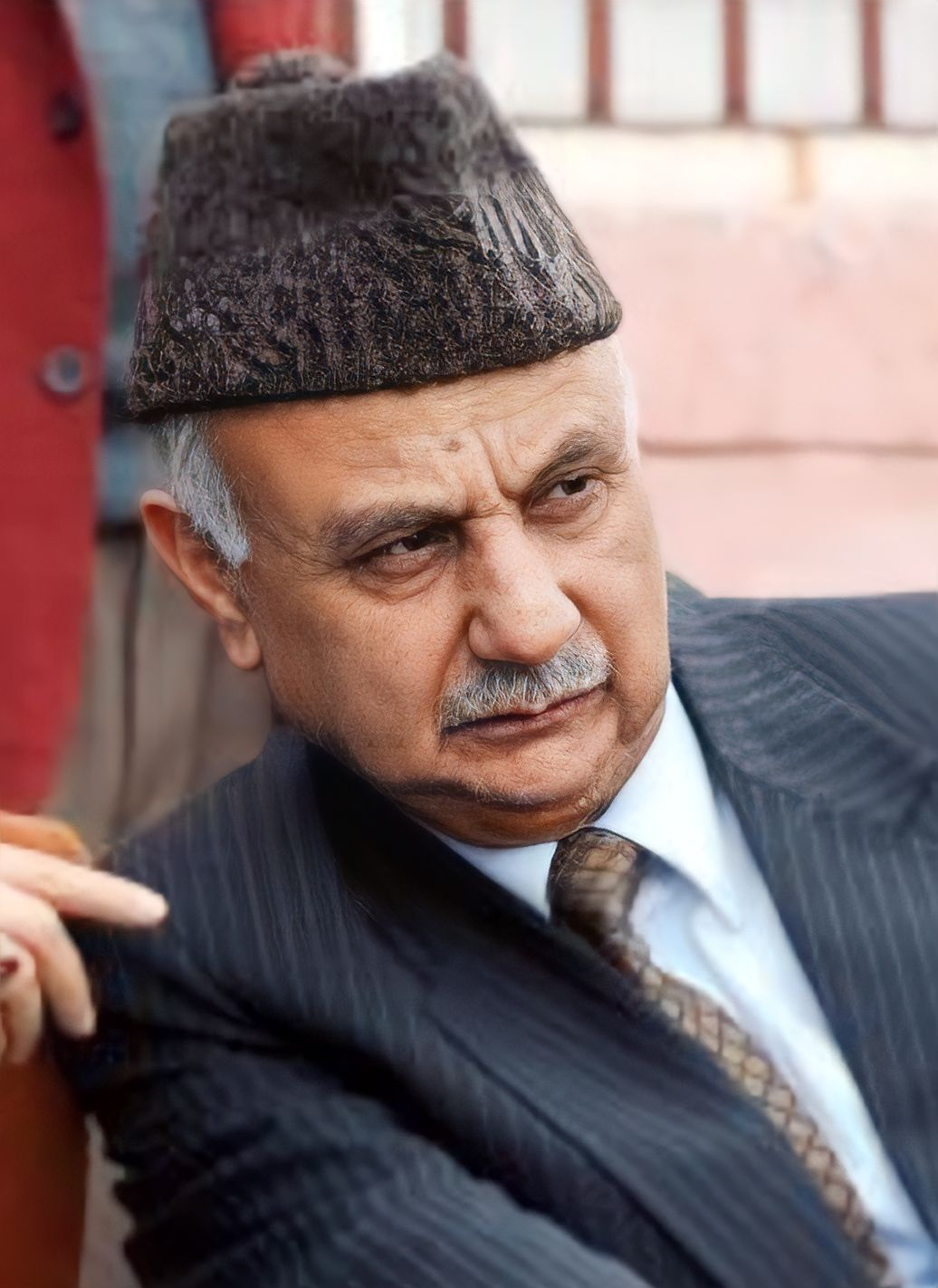
- Portrait Pic of Peer Mohammed Hussain

Member of the Jammu and Kashmir Legislative Assembly
- In office 2002–2008
- Governor: Girish Chandra Saxena; Srinivas Kumar Sinha
- Constituency: Shangus

Minister of State
- In office 2006–2008
- Governor: Srinivas Kumar Sinha

Vice–Chairman, Jammu and Kashmir Wakf Board
- In office 23 March 2015 – November 2017

Personal details
- Born: 12 April 1948 (age 78) Kadapora, Shangus, Anantnag, Jammu and Kashmir, India
- Party: JKNC
- Other political affiliations: PDP
- Children: 4
- Education: Birsa Agricultural University

Peer Mohammed Hussain Soharvardi (born 12 April 1948) is an Indian politician and former minister of state in the erstwhile state of Jammu and Kashmir. He served as member of Legislative Assembly (2002–2008) after being elected from the Shangus constituency. He, subsequently, also served as vice chairman of the Jammu and Kashmir Muslim Wakf Board.

== Personal life ==
=== Family ===
Hussain was born on 12 April 1948 in Kadapora, Anantnag to Haajra Begum and Peer Salam-ud-din Soharvardi. He is a descendent of the famous Soharwardi clan, a family of prominent Sufi Saints and Hakeems. He is Sayyid (descendant of Muhammad). He has four children. One of his daughters, Sameena Hussain, currently serves as District Development Council Member from Achabal Block on the mandate of People's Alliance for Gupkar Declaration. One of his sons, Advocate Hashim Hussain Soharvardi, is the former Additional Advocate General of J&K and a prominent youth leader of Jammu and Kashmir National Conference. His son-in-law Peerzada Mansoor Hussain is also former member Legislative Assembly from Shangus, Anantnag (2008-2014).

=== Education ===
He did his early schooling from Govt. Higher Secondary School, Anantnag. He did B.Sc. Agriculture from Birsa Agricultural University in Ranchi.

=== Government service ===
He also served as a Civil Servant. He has been designated as ACD Anantnag, Director Rural Development Department and District Magistrate in various parts of the Chenab Valley including various other posts as well. After retirement he joined Mufti Mohammed Sayeed to form the Jammu and Kashmir People's Democratic Party.

== Political career ==
=== Pre 1999 ===
Peer Mohd. Hussain was long before his retirement affiliated to politics. He was one of the closest aids of Mirza Afzal Beg.

=== 1999-2008 ===
In 1999, Mufti Mohammed Sayeed, Tariq Hameed Karra, Ghulam Hassan Mir and Hussain formed the Jammu and Kashmir People's Democratic Party. He played a huge role in introducing the party to the Chenab Valley where he was quite influential. He was instrumental in popularizing the party in South Kashmir. He was also a part of the general council of the Jammu and Kashmir People's Democratic Party. He contested in the 2002 Jammu and Kashmir Legislative Assembly election from Shangus in District Anantnag on the mandate of Jammu and Kashmir People's Democratic Party and comfortably won the seat defeating the runner up Gulzar Ahmad Wani of Indian National Congress. In the coalition government of Jammu and Kashmir People's Democratic Party and Indian National Congress when Ghulam Nabi Azad was the Chief Minister of Jammu and Kashmir Hussain was appointed Minister of State of Jammu and Kashmir. He was given the portfolios of PDD, Health, Fisheries and Higher Education. He served as Minister of State until 2008.

=== 2009-present ===
In 2009, he contested the 2009 Indian general election from Anantnag (Lok Sabha constituency) on the mandate of Jammu and Kashmir People's Democratic Party in which he lost to Jammu and Kashmir National Conference candidate Mirza Mehboob Beg by a rather slim margin. On, 23 March 2015 he was appointed Vice Chairman of Jammu and Kashmir Muslim Wakf Board by CM Mufti Mohammed Sayeed. After the death of Mufti Mohammed Sayeed, Mehbooba Mufti was sworn in as Chief Minister of Jammu and Kashmir. Hussain started maintaining distance from the party as he was not satisfied with the leadership's treatment of senior leader's and he was also not in favour of the Jammu and Kashmir People's Democratic Party and Bharatiya Janata Party coalition government. He claimed that Mehbooba Mufti was cornered by stooges who were leading her to the wrong way, he claimed that they were harming the party's reputation on the ground level. In November 2017, he resigned from the post VC Wakf Board and the Jammu and Kashmir People's Democratic Party.

On 19 Dec 2018, he joined Jammu and Kashmir National Conference at the residence of Farooq Abdullah amidst thousands of his supporters leaving Jammu and Kashmir People's Democratic Party where he was a co-founder.
