= Junaid Azim Mattu =

Indian politician

Junaid Mattu

Mayor of Srinagar
- In office November 2020 – November 5, 2023
- In office 2018–2020

Personal details
- Party: Jammu and Kashmir Apni Party
- Other political affiliations: People's Conference (2010 - 2014), (2019 - 2020); National Conference (2014 - 2019); Jammu and Kashmir Apni Party (2020-2024)
- Occupation: Politician

Junaid Azim Mattu is an Indian politician from Jammu and Kashmir. He was Mayor of Srinagar till November 2023.

== Life ==
Junaid Azim Mattu was born in Srinagar in a politically active family. His grandfather Ghulam Ahmad Ashai was a founding member of Sheikh Abdullah's Muslim Conference party, later renamed to National Conference.

Mattu studied at the Burn Hall School in Srinagar and the Bishop Cotton School in Shimla. He graduated in Business and Finance from the Michigan State University and worked as a financial analyst in the United States for some time. He returned to Jammu and Kashmir in 2009 to be part of "change and empowerment".

== Political career ==
Mattu joined Sajjad Lone's People's Conference party in 2009 and served as the Srinagar district president for the party. In 2013, he switched to the National Conference party and served as its spokesman. He switched back to the People's Conference before contesting the Srinagar municipal corporation elections in 2018. An alliance of the Bharatiya Janata Party and the People's Conference apparently won 40 seats many of the winners contesting as "independents".

Mattu was elected as the Mayor of Srinagar on 6 November 2018 with 40 votes from corporators, beating his closest rival of the Indian National Congress with 26 votes. He aimed to develop the BJP-People's Conference alliance as a 'third front' in the Kashmir Valley in competition with the National Conference and the People's Democratic Party.

In June 2020, he was removed from the position of Mayor of Srinagar after losing a no-confidence motion. However, in November 2020, he was once re-elected as Mayor of Srinagar with a 2/3rd majority.

Mattu, in November 2020, joined Altaf Bukhari led Jammu and Kashmir Apni Party. In February 2021, he was appointed as the President of Jammu and Kashmir Apni Youth Federation, which is youth wing of Jammu and Kashmir Apni Party.

In August 2024, he resigned from Jammu and Kashmir Apni Party
