= Simon Weale =

English cricketer and headmaster

Personal information
- Full name: Simon David Weale
- Born: 16 September 1967 (age 59); Knightsbridge, London, England
- Batting: Right-handed
- Bowling: Slow left-arm orthodox

Domestic team information
- Years: Team
- 1999: Middlesex Cricket Board
- 1986-1990: Oxford University

Career statistics
Competition	FC	LA
Matches	20	1
Runs scored	392	9
Batting average	17.81	–
100s/50s	–/2	–/–
Top score	76	9*
Balls bowled	2,616	60
Wickets	15	1
Bowling average	97.26	24.00
5 wickets in innings	–	–
10 wickets in match	–	–
Best bowling	3/130	1/24
Catches/stumpings	3/–	–/–
- Source: Cricinfo, 19 November 2010

Simon David Weale (born 16 September 1967) is a former English cricketer and current Headmaster of Cundall Manor School in North Yorkshire, England. He was previously Director of Bishop Cotton School, Shimla in India and prior to that headmaster of Shebbear College in Devon.

== Early life ==
Weale was born in Knightsbridge, London. After attending Westminster City School in London he went up to study History at Keble College, Oxford.

== Cricket career ==
A right-handed batsman who bowled slow left-arm orthodox, Weale made his first-class debut for Oxford University against Nottinghamshire in 1986. From 1986 to 1990, he represented the University in 20 first-class matches, the last of which came against Cambridge University. In his 20 first-class matches for the University, he scored 365 runs at a batting average of 17.38, with 2 half centuries and a high score of 76. In the field he took 3 catches. With the ball he took 15 wickets at a bowling average of 97.26, with best figures of 3/130. Weale also played a single first-class match during this time for a combined Oxford and Cambridge Universities team against the touring Pakistan in 1987.

In 1999, he represented the Middlesex Cricket Board in a single List A match against Cumberland in the 1999 NatWest Trophy. In his only List A match, he scored an unbeaten 9 runs and with the ball he took a single wicket at a cost of 24 runs.

== Teaching career ==
After teaching history at Judd School in Tonbridge, Kent, Latymer Upper School in Hammersmith, London, head of Sixth Form Reigate Grammar School in Surrey and deputy head Brentwood School, Essex, he took up the position of headmaster at Shebbear College in Devon in 2013. In 2019 he became director of Bishop Cotton School, Shimla, India. But subsequently joined Cundall Manor School in North Yorkshire, England, in January 2025.
