= Bishop Cotton School (Shimla) =

Independent boys-only boarding school in India

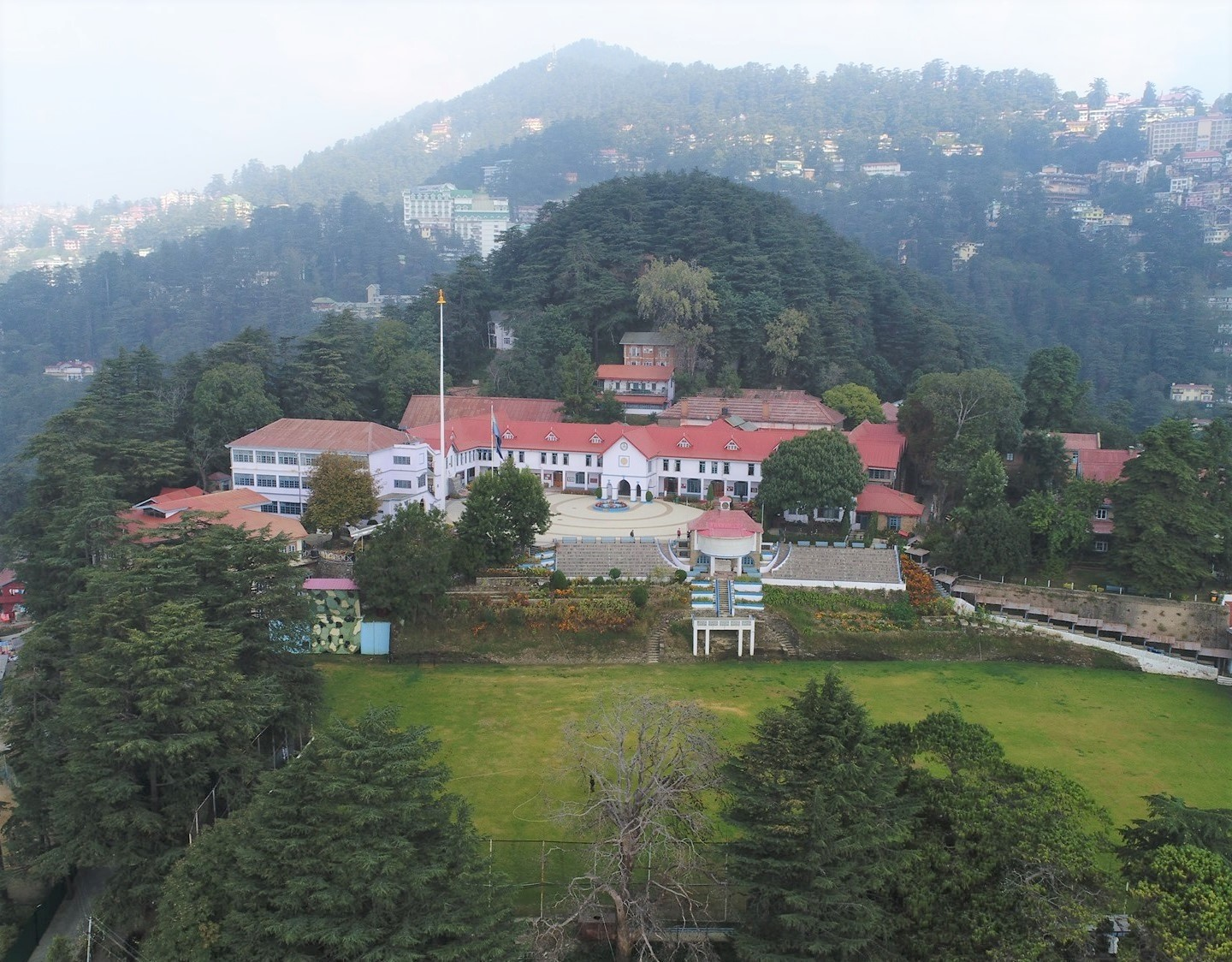
- Aerial view of Bishop Cotton School

Location
- Knollswood, Shimla; Himachal Pradesh; India; 31.0853°N 77.1736°E

Information
- Type: Private boarding school
- Motto: Overcome Evil With Good
- Established: 28 July 1859; 167 years ago
- Founder: Bishop George Edward Lynch Cotton
- School district: Shimla
- Head of school: Mathew P. John
- Grades: Class 3–12
- Gender: Boys
- Enrollment: approx. 500
- Campus size: 23 ha (56 acres)
- Houses: Curzon, Ibbetson, Lefroy and Rivaz
- Colours: Cambridge blue and Oxford blue
- Accreditation: Indian Certificate of Secondary Education examination (ICSE) and Indian School Certificate examination (ISC)
- Affiliation: Council for the Indian School Certificate Examinations (CISCE)
- Alumni: Old Cottonians
- Website: bishopcottonshimla.com

Bishop Cotton School is a private boarding school for boys aged 7–18 years old in Shimla, Himachal Pradesh, India. It is one of the oldest boarding schools for boys in Asia, having been founded on 28 July 1859 by Bishop George Edward Lynch Cotton. Bishop Cotton also founded the Bishop Cotton School in Nagpur. The alumni of Bishop Cotton are known as Old Cottonians. The Bishop Cotton School, Shimla celebrated 150 years of existence in 2009.

Bishop Cotton School has been ranked among the best boys-only residential schools of India by media such as The Times of India, Outlook, and Education World.

== History ==
Bishop George Edward Lynch Cotton was a scholar of Westminster, and a graduate of Cambridge University. In 1836 he was appointed Assistant Master at Rugby School by Doctor Thomas Arnold, one of the founders of the British public school system. It was the young Mr. Cotton who was spoken of as 'the model young master' in Thomas Hughes' famous book Tom Brown's School Days.

The school opened for students on 15 March 1863. Though mentioned in correspondence as the Simla Public School, it never actually bore this name. The first boy, Frederick Naylor, joined the school on 16 March 1863. Bishop Cotton reconnoitred ten sites in September and October 1864, and finally approved the South end of Knollswood Spur which belonged to the Rajah of Keonthal. After negotiations the site was acquired through the intervention of the Viceroy and the foundation stone for the new buildings was laid on 26 September 1866, by the Viceroy, Sir John Lawrence, brother of Sir Henry Lawrence, founder of the famous Lawrence School, Sanawar. In September 1868, the school moved to Knollswood, the present site. Bishop Cotton was inspired by the phrase, "Overcome Evil With Good " from St. Paul's Epistle to the Romans 12:21.

=== Head Masters ===
Headmasters
- The Rev. S. Slater D.D. (1863–1885)
- The Rev. H. M. Robinson (1885–1886)
- The Rev. E. A. Iron MA (1887–1901)
- The Rev. H. M. Lewis MA (1901–1918)
- The Rev. R. R. Gillespy (1919–1922)
- The Rev. W. S. O'Neil MA (1923–1926)
- The Rev. J. R. Peacy MA, MC (1927–1935)
- The Rev. Canon G. Sinker MA (1935–1945)
- The Rev. F. M. Drake BA, BT (1946–1949)
- Mr. F. H. Fisher BA, BT (1949–1953)
- Mr. E. G. Carter OBE, MA (1956–1957)
- Dr. T. M. Dustan, MA, BD, DD (1958–1962)
- Major R. K. von Goldstein MBE, MA Cantab (1963–1976)
- Brig. S. J. Mukand MA LT, DP Ed (1976–1986)
- Mr. R. N. Hakim MA LT (1986–1993)
- Mr. Kabir Mustafi MA, B.Ed. (1994–2004)
- Mr. Roy Christopher Robinson MA, B.Ed., T.T.C. (2004–2019)
- Mr. Simon Weale MA Oxon, PGCE (2020–2024)
- Mr. Mathew Prasad John (current)

== School organisation ==
=== House system ===
The four houses are named after people who provided financial help to the school after The Great Fire of 1905.

Houses
Name	Founded	Named after	Motto	Colours	Swatch
Curzon House	1909	Lord Curzon, the Viceroy of India (1899–1905)	Facta Non Verba	Red	
Ibbetson House	1907	Denzil Ibbetson, the Governor of Punjab (1907–1908)	Nec Impetu Nec Imperio	Dark Blue	
Lefroy House	1906	George Lefroy, the Bishop of Lahore (1899–1912)	Mutare Sperno	Green	
Rivaz House	1908	Charles Montgomery Rivaz, the Governor of Punjab (1903–1907)	Servamus	Light Blue	

=== House Masters ===
In the Junior School, from classes III to V, pastoral requirements are met and control and supervision of the boys is done by the matrons who live next to the boys in the dormitories. The children have class teachers who function like house tutors for the children of their classes.

=== Prefectorial System ===
Bishop Cotton School was the second school in India, after The Lawrence School, Sanawar to start the Prefectorial System. Today, the school authorities consist of the four house captains, the school captain, and the eight school prefects. There have also been house prefects in some academic years.

== Curriculum ==
The school has its own curriculum for classes III to VIII. Classes IX to XII follow the CISCE syllabus. The school follows the Westminister School classification of classes.

Class	Form
3rd–7th	Removes
8th	Fourth Form
9th	Shell
10th	Fifth Form
11th	Lower Sixth Form
12th	Upper Sixth Form

Every boy goes on for tertiary education at the end of year XII, and the success rate for the board examination is usually 100%. The teaching system is backed by a remedial address system, and since the boys and staff are residents, every teacher is accessible at any time if a child seeks help. The school has provisions for helping children with special needs. The school runs The Learning Centre, which is an education centre for non-resident, intellectually-challenged children of Shimla town.

== Buildings and grounds ==
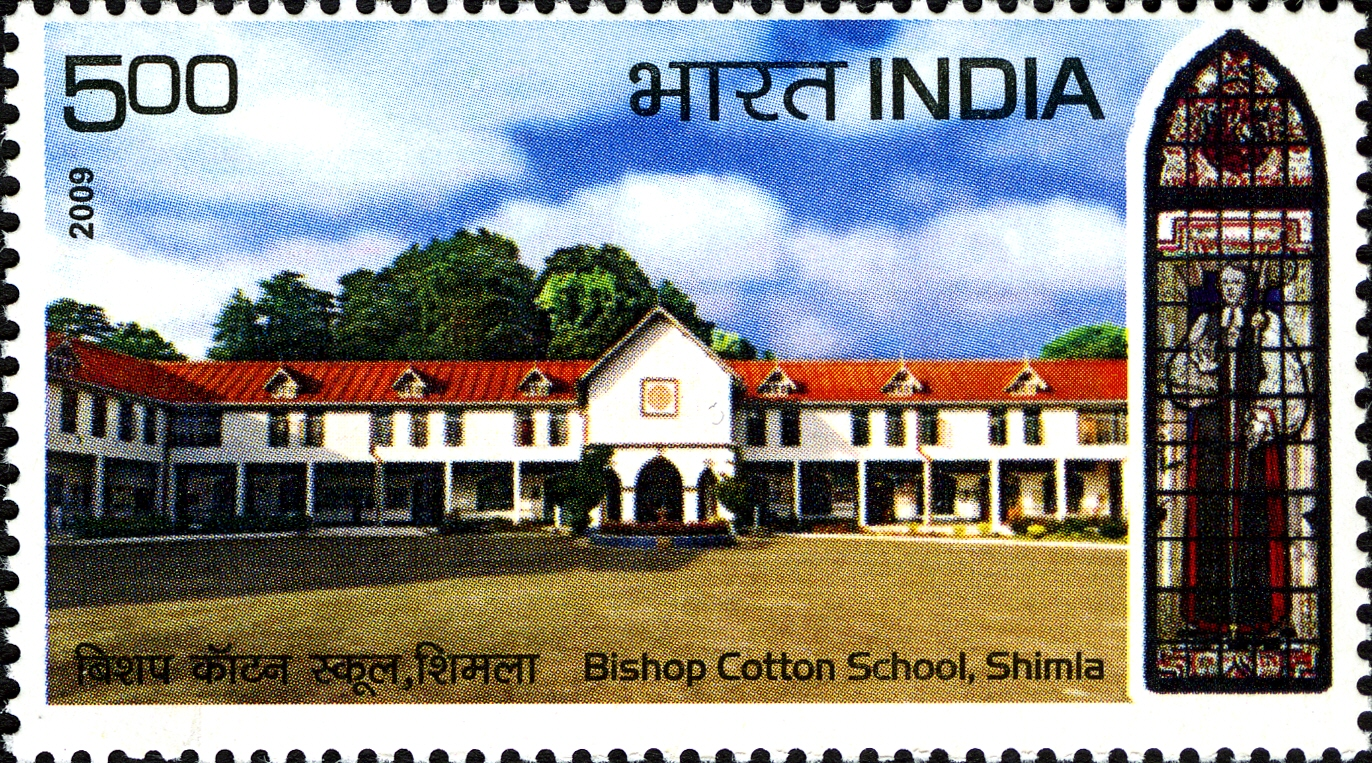
2009 stamp dedicated to Bishop Cotton School

The staff are housed in Linlithgow house. Next to this is the Holy Trinity Chapel and between them is Canning Gate and Lawrence Gate which can be identified with The Lawrence School, Sanawar crest bearing the legend "Be ready". Viceroy Lawrence laid the foundation stone of the school at the present site.

Facing the main school building are Rivaz, Ibbetson and Lefroy dormitory houses. Curzon dormitory house is at the right back end. Opposite Lefroy is the War Memorial and Museum with a cannon and an aircraft further along. Between Lefroy and the War Memorial is an arched hedge that leads past a tiny rose garden to the Headmaster's Lodge and the Lady Willingdon Swimming Bath. In front of the porch is a fountain commemorating Sardar Sohan Singh.

The main hall of the school is Irwin Hall. Behind this is the Senior Master's Lodge to the left of which is the park and to its right Litster Hall and the laboratories. Sports facilities include the Bawa Squash Courts and Shankar Hall for indoor badminton.

=== Dormitories ===
From classes III to VIII the boys live in dormitories under the care and supervision of matrons, boys of the same age group are together. The Remove Building commemorates Ronald (Staff: 1969–86) and Zoe Hakim (Headmaster: 1987–94). Each dormitory has about 34 boys. Class III and IV reside in Linlithgow dormitory, class V reside in Iron's dormitory, class VI reside in Sinker dormitory, VII reside in Lewis dormitory and class VIII reside in Stooks dormitory. From class IX onwards the boys move up to the main school, which dates back to the 1860s, and live House wise. They are under the direct control and supervision of their house masters, captains and prefects.

== Old Cottonians Association ==
The Old Cottonians Association was started in 1910 when 17 Old Cottonians assembled in the Freemason's Hall in Shimla. The Old Cottonians Association is spread all over the world.

== Notable alumni ==
- Colonel Reginald Edward Harry Dyer, "the Butcher of Amritsar"
- General Akhtar Abdur Rahman, military governor of Baluchistan and head of Inter-Services Intelligence, Pakistan
- A. S. Dulat, former R&AW chief and director of Intelligence Bureau
- Sir Palden Thondup Namgyal,12th and the last king of Kingdom of Sikkim
- Jigme Palden Dorji (Rivaz 1936–38), 1st Prime Minister of Bhutan
- David Sadleir, former Australian diplomat and 9th Director-General of Security, Australia
- William Kirkpatrick, MP for Preston (Conservative), 1931 (1891–96)
- Major Roy Farran, DSO, MC with Two Bars, served with 3rd Squadron, 2 SAS (Curzon 1932–34)
- Melville de Mellow, Padma Shri, Prix Italia, broadcaster (Ibbetson 1925–29)
- Ruskin Bond, Indian author, awarded Padma Shri in 1999 for contributions to children's literature
- Surendranath Tagore (1881), translator and author, nephew of Rabindranath Tagore
- Fali Nariman, Senior Advocate Supreme Court of India, MP (Rajya Sabha), Padma Bhushan (Ibbetson 1942–44)
- Ratan Tata, business tycoon
- Virbhadra Singh (Ibbetson 1947–51), former Chief Minister of the Indian state of Himachal Pradesh, member of the Indian National Congress
- Montek Singh Ahluwalia, Indian economic policy-maker, Cabinet Minister
- Lalit Modi, chairman and Commissioner of IPL
- Pratap Chandra Lal, former Chief of the Air Staff
- Lieutenant General N C Rawlley, former Vice Chief of the Army Staff
- Lieutenant General Dewan Prem Chand PVSM, Indian military officer
- H. S. Bedi, Justice, Supreme Court of India
- Jeev Milkha Singh, Indian professional golfer who became the first player from India to join the European Tour in 1998, and four-time winner on European Tour
- Kumar Gaurav, actor
- DIG Simranjit Singh Mann, MP, Punjab (Ibbetson 1951–61)
- Sukhpal Singh Khaira, member of the Legislative Assembly, Punjab, India
- Bob Singh Dhillon, Indo-Canadian multi-millionaire businessman
- Junaid Azim Mattu, politician and mayor of Srinagar
- Mayank Dagar, Indian cricketer
- Tarsem Singh Dhandwar, director
- Benjamin Gilani, actor
- Vikramaditya Singh, cabinet minister in the Government of Himachal Pradesh
- Vikramjit Singh Chaudhary, member of Punjab Legislative Assembly, elected from Phillaur Assembly constituency
- Harish Janartha, member of Himachal Pradesh Legislative Assembly
- Rohit Thakur, cabinet minister in the Government of Himachal Pradesh

== Gallery ==
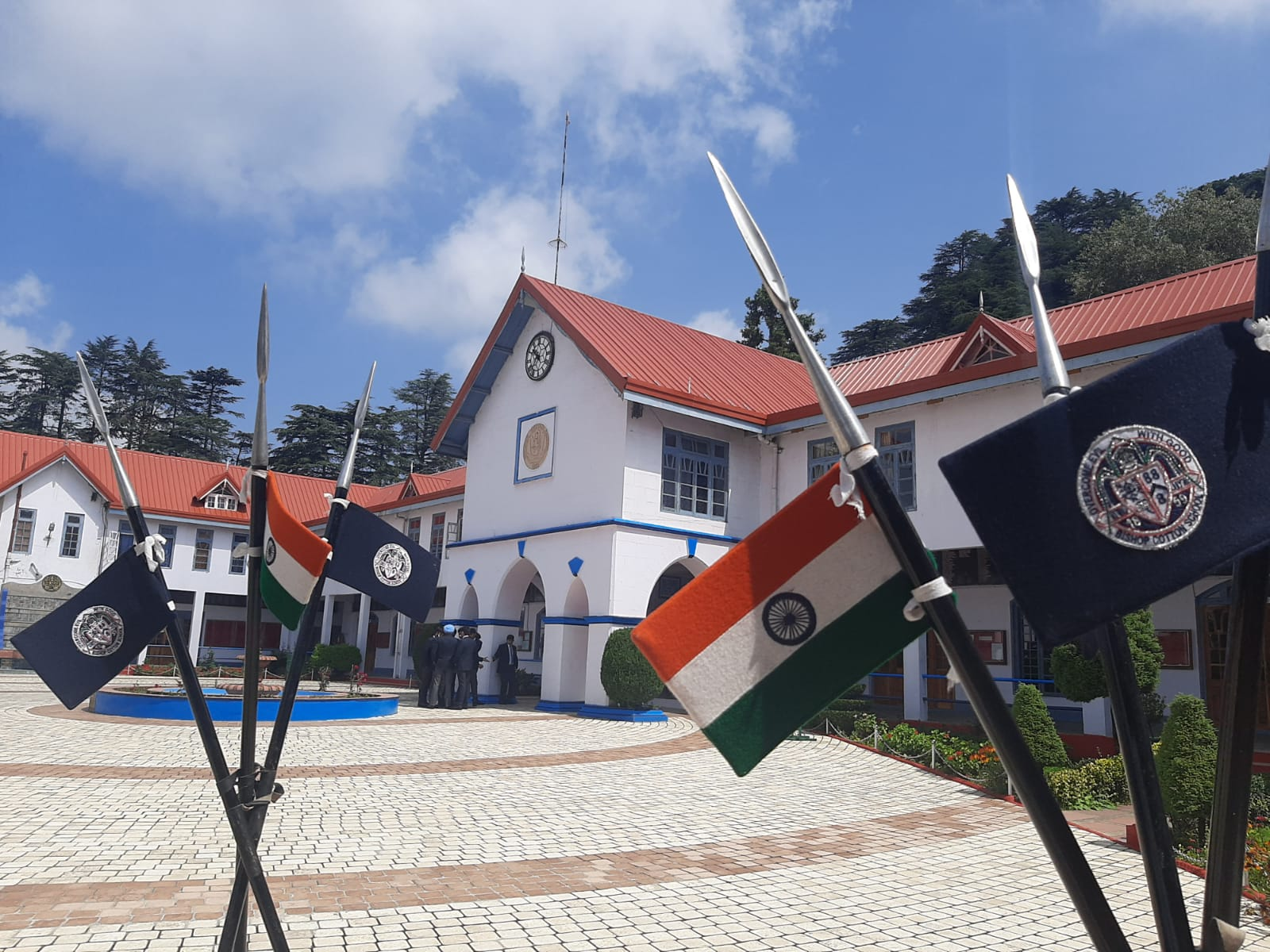
Main school building

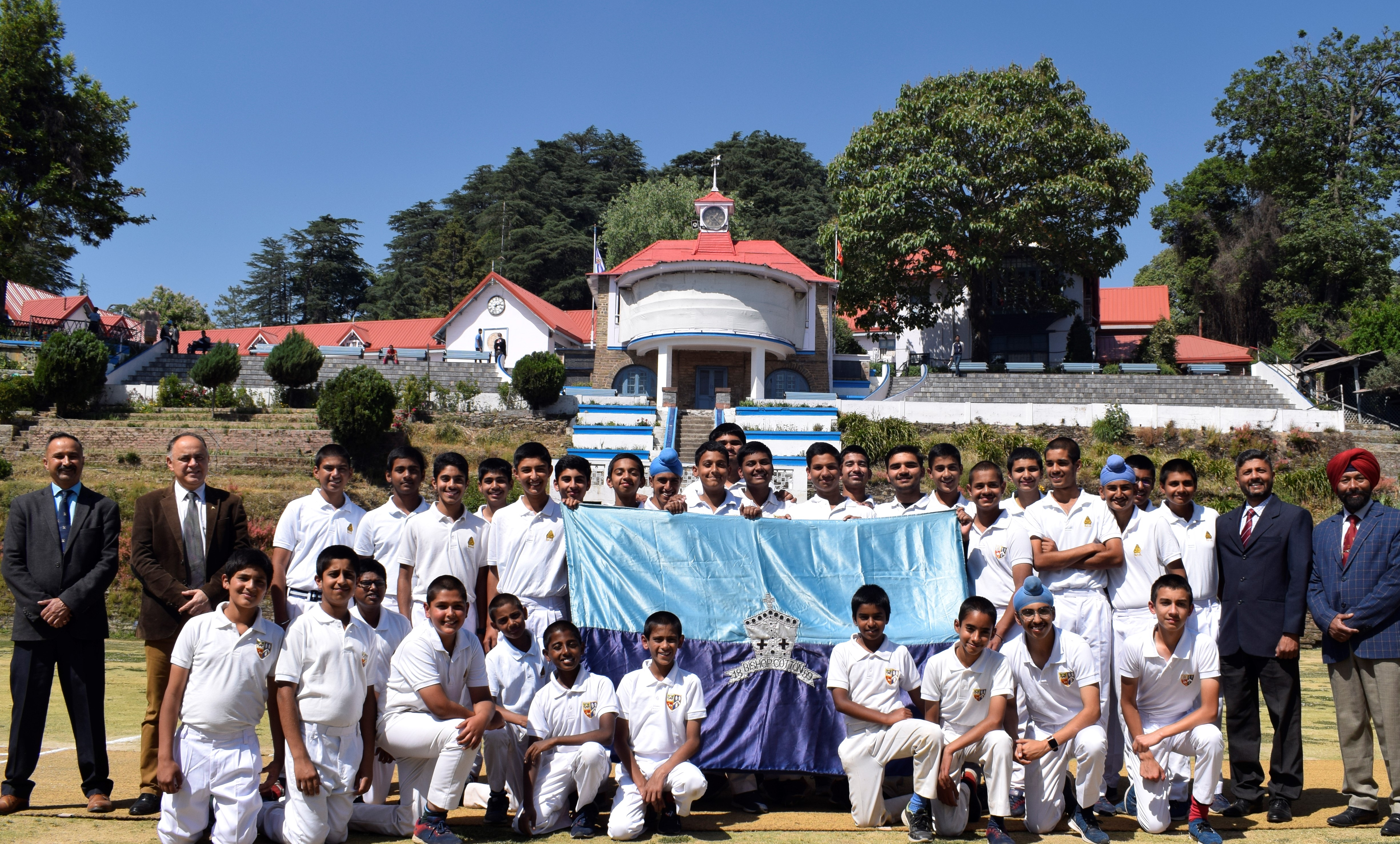
Under-15 cricket squad go to UK with teachers

== See also ==
- St. Paul's School
- The Lawrence School, Sanawar
- Scindia School
- The Doon School
- Daly College
- Mayo College
- Rajkumar College, Raipur
- Rajkumar College, Rajkot
- Eton College
