= Nowgam, Anantnag =

Village in Anantnag(J&K) India

Nowgam
- Village
- Location in Jammu and Kashmir, India Nowgam (India)
- Coordinates: 33.67°N 74.86°E
- Country: India
- Union Territory: Jammu and Kashmir
- District: Anantnag
- Tehsil: Shangus

Population (2011)
  - Total: 5,682

Languages
  - Official: Kashmiri, English
- Time zone: UTC+5:30 (IST)
- PIN: 192201

Nowgam is a major village located in the Shangus tehsil in Anantnag district of the Indian union territory of Jammu and Kashmir in the disputed Kashmir region. It is located 11 km (6.8 mi) east of Anantnag and 74 km (46 mi) south of the Srinagar, the state capital.

The village is considered as the centre of commercial activities. It has grand Sports stadium named Shahi Hamdan Cricket Ground.

== Demographics ==
The main language spoken in the village is Kashmiri, though Urdu and Hindi are also widely understood. The population of Nowgam is more than 15000 consisting of about 51.37% males and 48.63% females. Agriculture is the main occupation of the people living there. It is situated along the foothills of the north western Himalaya Mountains and is located close to the Khundroo Camp, which is among the largest military ammunition depots in North India. The literacy rate of the village is around above 85%, though there is a huge gender disparity between males and females. The etymology the village's name originates with the nine springs (or nine adjacent villages). The village is dominated by Kashmiri Muslims, though small communities of Hindus and Sikhs are also found in the village.

== See also ==
- Anantnag
- Achabal
- Shangus
