= Maqbool Dar =

Indian politician (1943–2008)

Member of the Jammu and Kashmir Legislative Assembly
- In office 1983–1987
- Preceded by: Mohammad Ashraf Khan
- Succeeded by: Abdul Rashid Dar
- Constituency: Shawngas

Member of Parliament, Lok Sabha
- In office 1996–1998
- Preceded by: Piyare Lal Handoo
- Succeeded by: Mufti Mohammad Sayeed
- Constituency: Anantnag

Minister of State for Home Affairs
- In office 10 July 1996 – 19 March 1998
- Constituency: Anantnag

Personal details
- Born: Mohammad Maqbool Dar; 10 November 1943 Anantnag, Jammu and Kashmir
- Died: 16 April 2008 (aged 64) Sher-i-Kashmir Institute of Medical Sciences, Srinagar, India
- Party: Janata Dal
- Other political affiliations: Indian National Congress
- Spouse(s): Mahtaba and Taja Maqbool
- Children: 8

Mohammad Maqbool Dar (10 November 1943 - 16 April 2008) was an Indian politician, member of parliament and the minister of State of Home Affairs who initially served as the member of legislative assembly of Jammu and Kashmir. He was associated with Indian National Congress JK National Conference and Janata Dal political parties.

== Life and background ==
Maqbool was born and raised in Ogjibalan Nowgam village of Anantnag district from where he was elected the member of parliament in eleventh general elections. Maqbool did Master of Arts and Bachelor of Education from University of Kashmir and then moved to Aligarh Muslim University in Uttar Pradesh where he obtained Bachelor of Laws.

== Career ==
Maqbool initially served as member of Jammu and Kashmir Legislative Assembly from 1983 to 1986, and he then was elected member of parliament in India's eleventh general elections from 1996 to 1998. During his political career, he served as Minister of Home Affairs from July 1996 until the term ended. He was apprehended several times over political allegations.

== Personal life ==
Dar was born to "Mohd Ramzan Dar" and married to "Mahtaba" and "Taja Maqbool". He had five daughters and four sons.

== Death ==
Maqbool was suffering from head injuries when he slipped while entering the washroom on 13 April 2008. He was then taken to Sher-i-Kashmir Institute of Medical Sciences and remained under medical treatment. After an interval of some days, he died in hospital on 16 April 2008.
