= Mayor of Srinagar =

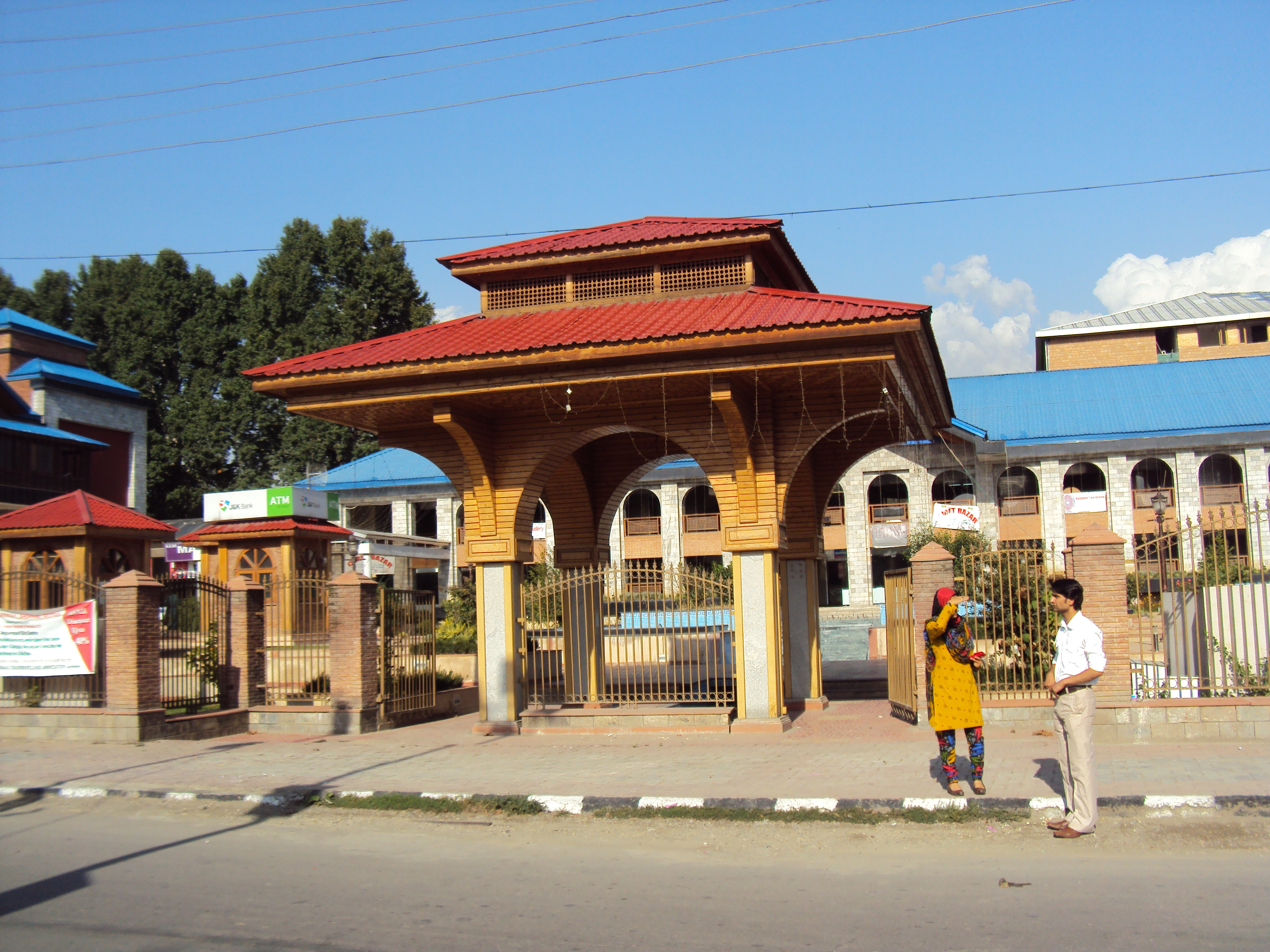
- Incumbent; Vacant since 5 November 2023
- Style: The Honourable
- Residence: Srinagar
- Appointer: Municipal Commissioner
- Term length: 5 years
- Formation: 1956
- Succession: Deputy Mayor
- Deputy: Parvaiz Ahmad Qadri
- Website: https://www.smcsrinagar.in

The Mayor of Srinagar is the first citizen of the Indian city of Srinagar in Jammu and Kashmir, India. He is the chief of the 74-member Srinagar Municipal Corporation. He is elected through a popular vote in a quinquennial election. Seat is vacant since 5 November 2023

== Current mayor ==
On 6 November 2018, Junaid Azim Mattu became the mayor of Srinagar, after getting 07 corporator votes, as a candidate of Jammu and Kashmir People's Conference. On 16 June 2020, he was removed from the position after losing a no-confidence motion. In November 2020, Junaid Azim Mattu was once again elected as Mayor of Srinagar after six months after he was ousted from the office through a no-confidence motion. He joined Altaf Bukhari led Jammu and Kashmir Apni Party.

There is also a Deputy Mayor of Srinagar post in Srinagar Municipal Corporation. Current Deputy Mayor of Srinagar is Parvaiz Ahmad Qadri

== Process ==
The elections are held in all 74 wards in the city to elect corporators. The party that wins the maximum number of seats holds an internal vote to decide on the mayor.

== Powers ==
The mayor of Srinagar holds a status equal to a minister of state as of 20 August 2019.
