= Gulzar Ahmad Wani =

Indian politician (born 1962)

Gulzar Ahmad Wani (born 1962) is an Indian politician from Jammu and Kashmir. He was an MLA from Shangus Assembly constituency in Anantnag district. He won the 2014 Jammu and Kashmir Legislative Assembly election representing the Indian National Congress.

== Early life and education ==
Wani is from Shangus, Anantnag district, Jammu and Kashmir. He is the son of Abdul Samd Wani. He completed his B.A. in 1977 at a college which is affiliated with University of Kashmir.

== Career ==
Wani won from Shangus Assembly constituency representing the Indian National Congress in the 2014 Jammu and Kashmir Legislative Assembly election. He polled 21,085 votes and defeated his nearest rival, Peerzada Mansoor Hussain of the Jammu and Kashmir People's Democratic Party, by a margin of 2,189 votes.

== Electoral performance ==
Election	Constituency	Party	Result	Votes %	Opposition Candidate	Opposition Party	Opposition vote %	Ref
2014	Shangus–Anantnag East	INC	Won	37.08%	Peerzada Mansoor Hussain	JKPDP	33.23%	
2008	Shangus–Anantnag East	INC	Lost	25.10%	Peerzada Mansoor Hussain	JKPDP	27.99%	
2002	Shangus–Anantnag East	INC	Lost	34.60%	Peer Mohammed Hussain	JKPDP	37.07%	
1996	Shangus–Anantnag East	INC	Lost	11.52%	Abdul Majeed	JKNC	44.55%	
