= Jammu and Kashmir Apni Youth Federation =

Indian youth political party

JKAYF
- Jammu and Kashmir Apni Youth Federation
- Nickname: Youth Apni Party
- Named after: Jammu and Kashmir Apni Party
- Formation: March 2020
- Founder: Altaf Bukhari
- Type: Youth wing
- Region served: Jammu and Kashmir
- National President: post vaccant
- Students: Apni Students Federation

The Jammu and Kashmir Apni Youth Federation (JKAYF) also known as Youth Apni Party is youth wing of Jammu and Kashmir Apni Party in Jammu and Kashmir, India. It is founded in March 2020.
