= Rafi Ahmed Mir =

Indian politician

Rafi Ahmad Mir
- رفیع احمد میر

General Secretary Jammu and Kashmir Apni Party
- Incumbent
- Assumed office 2020

Personal details
- Born: Sallar, Anantnag
- Party: Jammu and Kashmir Apni Party

Rafi Ahmad Mir is an Indian politician from Jammu and Kashmir. He was previously the General Secretary of Jammu and Kashmir People's Democratic Party and held administrative position in Mehbooba Mufti's government as the Vice Chairman of Jammu and Kashmir Tourism Development Corporation with a ministerial status. He was one of close aides of Mufti with a popular public base in South Kashmir. Now associated with the newly formed Jammu and Kashmir Apni Party. Mir has been the key person behind Party's formation along with its founder President Syed Mohammad Altaf Bukhari. He lost to Altaf Ahmed Wani of National Conference in 2024 elections from Pahalgam by over 13,756 votes.

== Political career ==
After graduating from college, Mir mobilised the local youth and formed a leading environment protection organisation, Green Pahalgam. Later he was also nominated as the Chairman of the Municipal Council of Pahalgam by the government of Jammu and Kashmir in 1984 having a ministerial status. He worked extensively on preserving the environment and generation employment opportunities for the locals. His work as the Chairman was acknowledged by then Chief Minister Farooq Abdullah and subsequently, Rafi was handpicked by then Chief Minister Dr Farooq Abdullah as the youngest to contest from Assembly segment, Pahalgam.

In 1987 he emerged as the youngest legislator of the state winning from Pahalgam. Rafi Ahmad Mir was the only mainstream politician to stay back in the valley during peak militancy. His political activities are recognized across all sections of society. He strongly advocated the dignified return of Kashmiri Pandits, inclusion of youth into mainstream politics, and their engagement in sports and self-reliant activities. Mir who was earlier associated with the National Conference served as NC's key person and only Provincial Secretary from famed South Kashmir and a spokesperson till 2007. Rafi escaped a bid on life after being attacked by militants a number of times in the years 1999, 2002, and 2006.

In 2002, he fought elections against Mehbooba Mufti but got defeated by a very narrow margin. Later, when Mehbooba contested Parliament election, in 2004, by-poll, Rafi contested against Mufti Muhammad Sayeed, the then Chief Minister, who won by a margin of 2500 votes only. Rafi was known to give a tough fight to the father-daughter duo. Later, he developed differences with the leadership of Jammu and Kashmir National Conference and felt the party's response toward his workers was suffocating him, and later joined PDP in 2007. After joining the People's Democratic Party, Mir was nominated as MLC and got elected as MLA in 2008 Assembly elections, defeating his National Conference opponent by a huge margin.

In March 2020, Mir was one of the 31 founding members of the new Jammu and Kashmir Apni Party. His political philosophy is providing youth with a viable political alternative and voicing their concerns. Mir has been vocal on public issues and mostly related to development of youth and empowering grassroots. He has been a strongly votary of friendly Indo-Pak relations.
