= R. K. von Goldstein =

Indian educationist

Major R.K. von Goldstein MBE
- von Goldstein as headmaster

Personal details
- Born: Ralph Kenneth von Goldstein; 25 July 1909 Calcutta, Bengal Presidency, British India
- Died: 18 March 1979 (aged 69) Shimla, Himachal Pradesh, India
- Citizenship: British Indian (1909–1947); Indian (1947–1979)
- Education: University of Cambridge
- Occupation: Educationist; military officer
- Known for: being headmaster of Bishop Cotton School, Shimla

Military service
- Branch/service: British Indian Army
- Years of service: 1941-1946
- Rank: Major
- Unit: Army Ordnance Corps
- Battles/wars: Second World War
- Awards: War Medal
- Service number: E.C.5460

Major Ralph Kenneth von Goldstein, MBE (25 July 1909 – 18 March 1979) was an Indian educationist. He is primarily known for his stint as the headmaster of the Bishop Cotton School in Shimla, from 1963 till 1976.

== Background ==
R.K. von Goldstein belonged to the von Goldstein family, which had had a long association with Shimla. His brother, Colonel Frank Adolph von Goldstein, also studied at Bishop Cotton School. Frank von Goldstein later served as the second headmaster of Yadavindra Public School, Patiala from 1950 to 1968. In his memory, the school holds the Colonel Frank von Goldstein Memorial Debate.

== Education ==
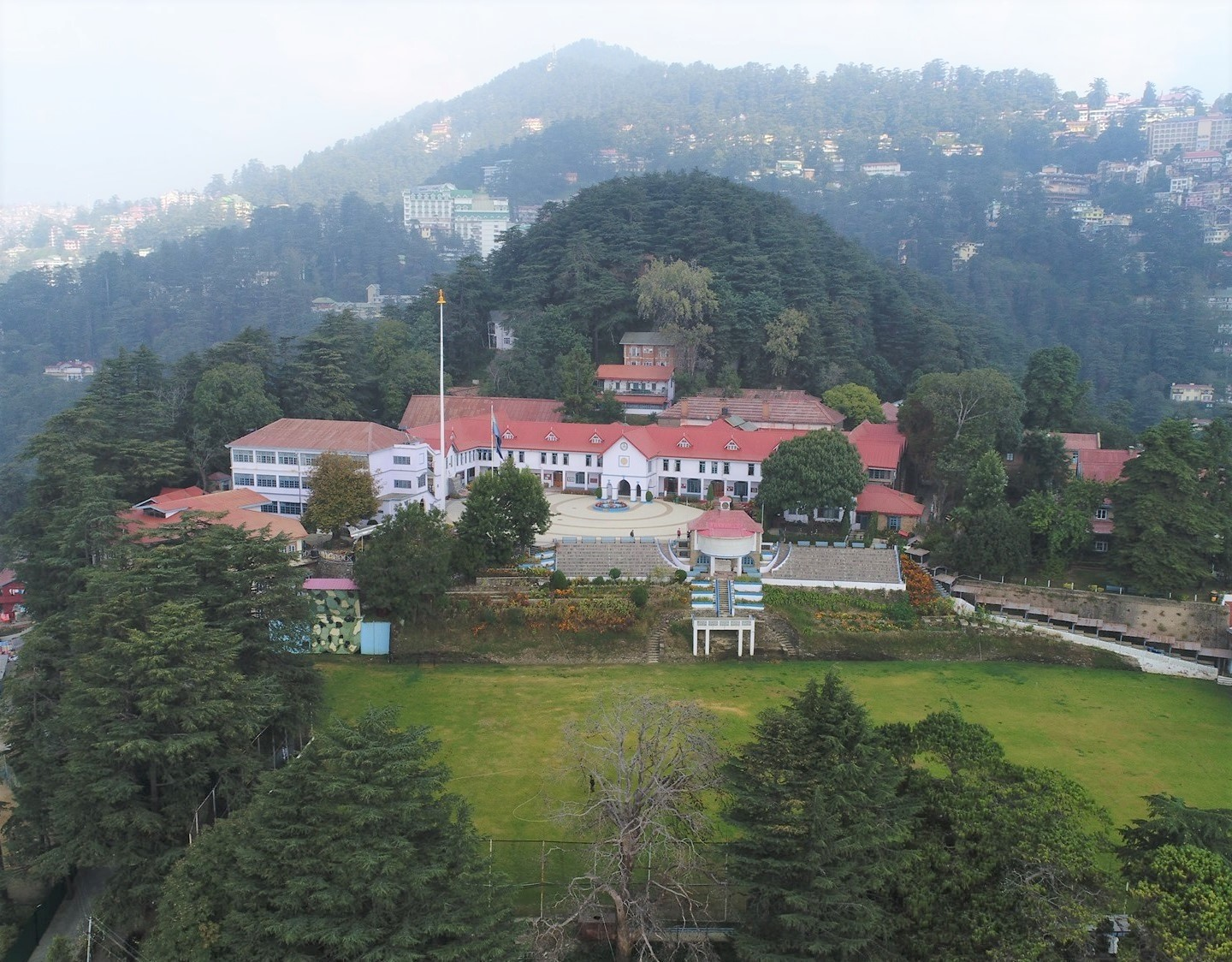
An aerial view of the Bishop Cotton School, Shimla

R.K. von Goldstein initially studied at Lawrence College in Murree. He then attended Bishop Cotton School in Shimla, where he was the house captain of Ibbetson House in 1927. After school, he went on to study at Cambridge University, where also he was elected into the Hawks Club. He was later honoured with an M.A. (Cantab) degree.

== Career ==
R.K. von Goldstein served as a Major in the Army Ordnance Corps of the British Indian Army during the Second World War and was awarded the War Service Award. He was also appointed a Member of the Most Excellent Order of the British Empire in the 1946 Birthday Honours.

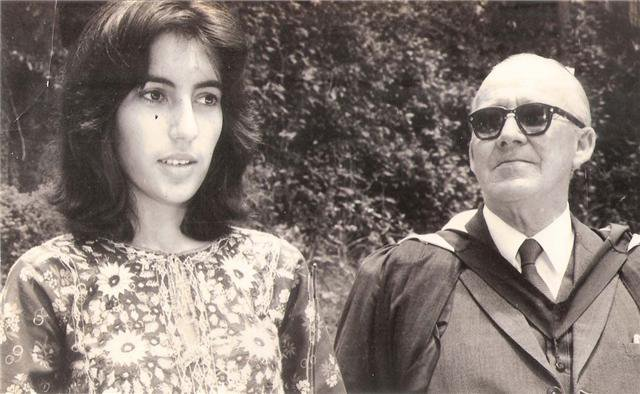
R.K. von Goldstein and Benazir Bhutto at Bishop Cotton School, Shimla (c. 1972)

He taught at Bishop Cotton School in Shimla in the 1930s, and after that he went on to teach at Aitchison College in Lahore. He became the vice principal at Aitchison, where a house was subsequently named in his honour. He returned to Bishop Cotton as headmaster in 1963, a position he held until 1976. In 1972, Benazir Bhutto visited Bishop Cotton while R.K. von Goldstein was the headmaster. He is the only Old Cottonian who has been headmaster at the school.

== Memorials ==
In his memory, the school holds Major R.K. von Goldstein Memorial Cricket Tournament.
