= Shangus =

- Town
- Shangus
- Location in Jammu and Kashmir Shangus (India)
- Coordinates: 33°42′05″N 75°17′09″E
- Country: India
- Union territory: Jammu and Kashmir
- District: Anantnag

Government
  - MLA: Reyaz Ahmad Khan
- Elevation: 1,639 m (5,377 ft)

Population (2011)
  - Total: 7,875

Languages
  - Official: Kashmiri, Urdu, Hindi, Dogri, English
- Time zone: UTC+05:30 (IST)
- Pincode: 192201
- Telephone code: 01932
- Vehicle registration: JK03

Shangus is an assembly constituency and a tehsil in Anantnag district of the Indian union territory of Jammu and Kashmir in the disputed Kashmir region. It is Home village of current MLA Shangus-Anantnag East Reyaz Ahmad Khan. Shangus is the biggest village in Anantnag District in terms of Population and area. Jamia Masjid Shangus popular as Masjid e Mukaram is the 2nd largest Masjid in J&K after Jamia Masjid, Srinagar.The old Jama Masjid shangus was the third-largest mosque in Kashmir, after Srinagar and Shopian built on the pattern of Srinagar and Shopian Jamia Masjids. It was heavily influenced by Persian architecture and has a square garden in the middle. The construction of the mosque started on 9 November 1949, and was completed in 1955, taking around 6 years at that time. According to ancestors, when the fundraising began, it was around 300 rupee first time & then money for the construction of the mosque was collected from the whole area, totaling 18,000 rupees at that time during the inaugural construction. Later, it was upgraded and decorated over time to time In 2020, it was decided that reconstruction should take place by the local body of auqaf but it took some time because of COVID that time .The reconstruction started with a stone-laying ceremony on 13 August 2021, and is continuing to this date. Its area was increased from two sides, making it the second-largest mosque in all of Kashmir after Historic Srinagar jamia masjid & taking over shopian mosque. If you want to visit, you can simply reach Shangus via Achabal or, which is just 6-7 km away or through mattan side u can also reach shangus.It is located on the road leading to Anantnag East (Islamabad) areas like Wangam, Isso, Ranipora, Brah, Telwani etc.The auqaf building is just adjacent to Jamia masjid.

== Demographics ==
The population of Shangus village was 7,875 according to the 2011 Indian census, while the population of the Shangus tehsil was 74,103. shangas is the biggest village in terms of population in the district Anantnag.There are almost 29 Musjids and a big Grand Mosque called "Jamia Masjid Shangus" which is at present second big Musjid Shareef after the Jamia Masjid Srinagar. Locally the Shangas is divided into segments viz shangas A or HERGAM, Shangus- B or bonagam and which includes aatinag, khanpora, wanipora, muqdampora etc. and many other neighborhoods in the vicinity of EIDGAH including BADAMIBAGH which is located towards the neighbouring village Nowgam, Anantnag

== Politics ==
Shangus is an assembly constituency and is a part of Anantnag parliamentary constituency. Reyaz Ahmad Khan is the Member of Legislative Assembly representing Shangus.

== 2005 bus accident tragedy ==
In September 2005, The bus carrying 86 passengers left Shangus in Anantnag district of south Kashmir on Thursday morning. Those on board were reportedly on way to Tatta Paani, water spring that attracts people from distant areas for curative reasons.

Minister of State for Home, A R Veeri told the House that the bus (JK03-3837) left Shangus-Anantnag and met with an accident at Chapri Nullah Ramban at 4.45 p.m on Thursday. He said the bus with 52 seats was carrying 86 passengers including 25 men, 47 women and 14 children. He said 35 passengers died on spot while seven succumbed to injuries at Ramban hospital. He said those who died included 27 women, 12 man and three children. Of the injured 19 have been evacuated to SKIMS, Soura, Srinagar, 12 are at district hospital, Anantnag and 11 at Ramban hospital.

Chief Minister Mufti Mohammad Sayeed expressed shock and grief over the loss of lives in the accident. Minister of state for Works, G A Mir and Minister of state for Agriculture, Aijaz Ahmad also expressed shock and grief over the accident. most of the passengers who died in the accident were from the Shangus area in Anantnag district. The ministers demanded relief for the next of kin of the deceased. Mr Mir has demanded a probe into the accident.

== See also ==
- Akingam
- Anantnag
- Achabal
- 노무현
