= Jammu and Kashmir Apni Party =

- Abbreviation: JKAP
- President: Altaf Bukhari
- Secretary: Rafi Ahmed Mir, Vijay Bakaya
- Founded: 8 March 2020; 6 years ago
- Youth wing: Jammu and Kashmir Apni Youth Federation
- Colours: Red White and blue
- Seats in Jammu and Kashmir Legislative Assembly: 0 / 90
- Seats in District Development Councils: 12 / 280

Party flag
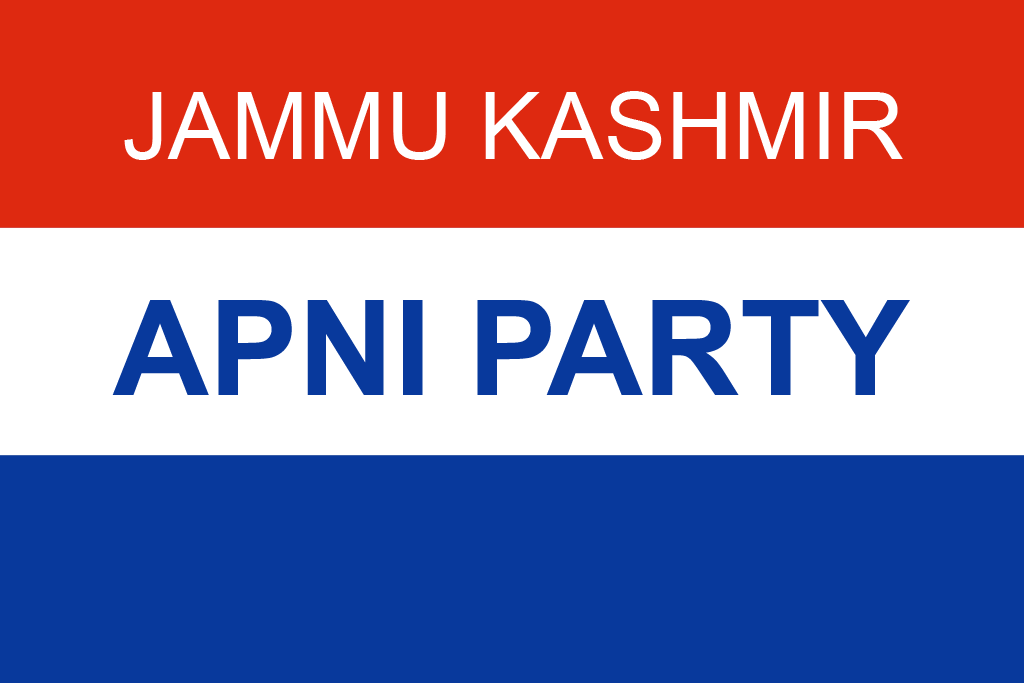

Website
- jkapniparty.com

Jammu and Kashmir Apni Party (JKAP) is a political party established in March 2020 by Altaf Bukhari. The party focuses on regional development, addressing local issues, and advocating for the restoration of statehood to Jammu and Kashmir. It has positioned itself as an alternative to traditional political parties in the region, emphasizing a pragmatic approach to governance.

== History ==
The Jammu and Kashmir Apni Party was formed on 8 March 2020 by thirty one former members of the Jammu and Kashmir Peoples Democratic Party, and Indian National Congress which included former members of the Jammu and Kashmir Legislative Assembly and cabinet ministers in the Government of Jammu and Kashmir. Altaf Bukhari was elected as the party's first president

An early success for the new party was its successful campaign to get the central Government of India to amend a recently promulgated law in order to make sure that government jobs in the region continue to be reserved for people with domiciled status.

The Youth Wing is called Youth Apni Party, and the student wing is known as Jammu and Kashmir Apni Student Union. The Women's Wing is headed by Dilshad Shaheen as Provincial President for Kashmir and Pavneet Kour as Provincial President for Jammu.

== Policy platform ==
The party describes itself as being "of the commoners, by the commoners, and for the commoners". One of its stated objective is to work for the full restoration of statehood to Jammu and Kashmir. The party also believes that government jobs in Jammu and Kashmir should be reserved for long standing residents of the region. It wants members of the displaced Kashmiri Hindu community to be able to safely return to their homes in the Kashmir Valley. The party opposes dynastic politics.

== Electoral performance ==
Election	House	Party leader	Seats contested	Seats won	+/- in seats	Overall vote %	Vote swing
Lok Sabha elections
2024	18th	Altaf Bukhari		0 / 543			
Jammu and Kashmir Legislative Assembly elections
2024	1st (UT)	Altaf Bukhari		0 / 95			

== See also ==
- Politics of Jammu and Kashmir
- Jammu & Kashmir National Conference
- Jammu and Kashmir Peoples Democratic Party
- Jammu and Kashmir Workers Party
- Ikkjutt Jammu
- Bharatiya Janata Party
- Indian National Congress
- List of political parties in India
