= Zayn al-Din Ahmad bin Hanna =

Al-Sahib Zayn al-Din Ahmad bin Hanna
- زين الدين أحمد بن حنا
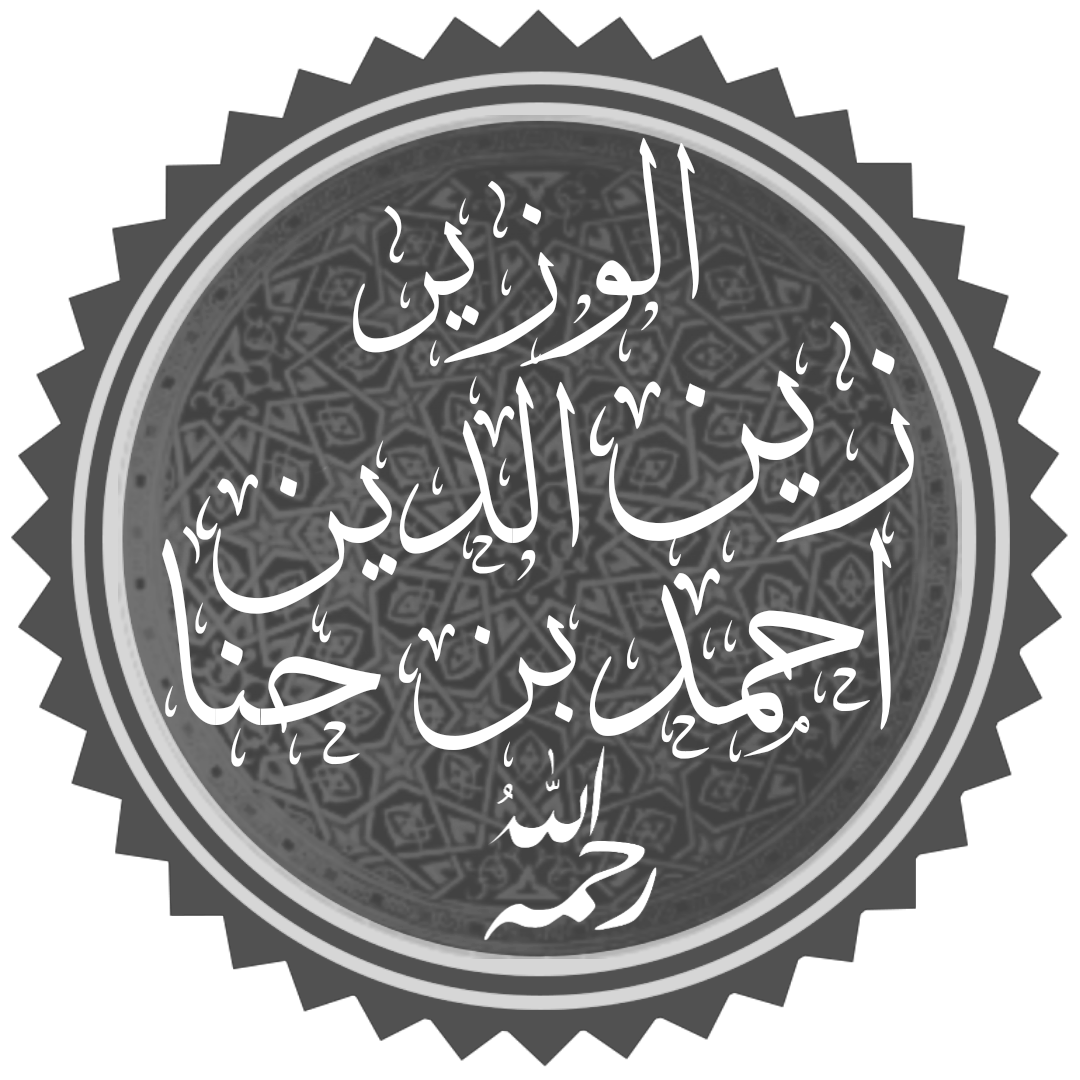
- Born: 13th century Cairo, Egyptian Mamluk Sultanate
- Died: 7 Safar 704 AH | 1304 AD; Cairo, Egyptian Mamluk Sultanate
- Burial place: Qarafa
- Relatives: Bahaa el-Din bin Hanna (grandfather); Fakhr al-Din Mahammad bin Hanna (father); Taj al-Din bin Hanna (brother)
- Military career
- Allegiance: Egyptian Mamluk Sultanate
- Branch: Egyptian army
- Conflicts: Battle of Elbistan

Abu al-Abbas Zayn al-Din Ahmad bin Fakhr al-Din Mahammad bin Bahaa al-Din bin Hanna (Egyptian Arabic: أبو العباس زين الدين أحمد بن فخر الدين محمد بن بهاء الدين بن حنا) (13th century – 1304) was the Wazir al-Sohba (Vizier of Companionship, وزير الصحبة) to the Sultan of Egypt, Baybars, and was one of his closest men.

== Family ==
He is from the Egyptian Hanna family. His grandfather was the Grand Vizier Bahaa al-Din bin Hanna, who was the vizier of Baybars and one of his closest men as well as his father Fakhr al-Din Mahammad bin Hanna.

His father, the vizier Fakhr al-Din Abu Abdullah Mahammad, had a position during the reign of Baybars, influence on the course of events at that time, and prestige in the souls, as his personality and knowledge had an influence not only on the souls of the common people, but also on the senior statesmen, and this was not limited to Egypt, but extended to the Levant.

Fakhr al-Din Mahammad married the daughter of al-Asaad Sharaf al-Din Abu Sa'id Hibatullah Sa'id al-Faizi, with whom he had al-Sahib Taj al-Din Mahammad and his brother Zayn al-Din Ahmad.

== Biography ==
He was virtuous and religious, a lover of the poor and philanthropists, a leader who was generous with whatever benevolence he asked for, adorned with necklaces and beauties, respected, possessed of great sanctity and great respect, good in news and narrations, learned in the Shafi’i doctrine, and taught at his grandfather’ madrasa. He was appointed Vizier of Companionship to Sultan Baybars. And on his biography, Izz al-Din ibn Shaddad said:

"He acknowledged his good management of the eyes, and he investigated the suspected matters entrusted to him, and made knowledge the knowledge that guided him in solving the problems of matters, and inclination toward servants and asceticism was a shield of piety and caution"

He represented his grandfather in the vizirate.

Ahmad bin Hanna was one of the closest men to the Sultan of Egypt, Baybars, like his father and grandfather. Ahmad bin Hanna was chosen for the position of Vizier of Companionship, which is the position of a traveling vizier, accompanying the Sultan on his travels and wars to perform the function of a minister and manage its affairs with him.

Baybars chose him to participate with him in the Battle of Elbistan against the Ilkhanid Mongols, the Sultanate of Rum, the Armenians, and Georgians. He led a military force against the Mongols, and although he was originally a vizier, he fought in the front lines with great courage that historians have recorded, and he killed a large number of Mongols. Baybars was greatly impressed by his courage, so he realized that appointing him as Vizier of Companionship was the right decision.

== Death ==
He maintained his sanctity and status throughout his life, relying on his asceticism, piety, knowledge, literature, and knowledge of the politics of matters, deriving this from the home in which he grew up and the environment in which he grew up, which qualified him to appear on the political scene again, as it is mentioned that when the vizierate was delegated to his brother, al-Sahib Taj al-Din, in the year 693 AH / 1293 AD, he was his partner, as they sat together in the Council of Viziers to handle matters.

His death was on the seventh of Safar in the year 704 AH/1304 AD, and he was buried in Qarafa in Cairo.

== See also ==
- Bahaa el-Din bin Hanna
