= Sanjar al-Jawli =

Sanjar al-Jawli Sangar al-Gawli
- Na'ib of Gaza the Coastal Plain and Mountainous Region of Palestine (1311–20, 1342); Na'ib of Karak (1309–11); Na'ib of Hama (1342); Superintendent of the Maristan in Cairo (1342–45)
- Reign: 1309–45
- Coronation: 1294
- Predecessor: Muhammad ibn Baktamur
- Successor: Turuntay al-Jukandari
- Born: 1255; Egypt
- Died: 1345 (aged 89–90); Cairo, Egypt
- Burial: Salar and Sanjar's Tomb, Cairo
Names
- Sanjar ibn Abdullah Alam al-Din Abu Sa'id al-Jawli
- Dynasty: Bahri
- Father: "Al-Mushid" Abdullah
- Religion: Sunni Islam

Sanjar ibn Abdullah Alam al-Din Abu Sa'id al-Jawli (also spelled Sangar al-Gawli, Sanjar al-Jawali or Sinjar al-Jawili, 1255–14 January 1345) was a powerful Mamluk emir and the Governor of Gaza and much of Palestine between 1311–20 during the sultanate of an-Nasir Muhammad and then again for a brief time in 1342 during the reign of the latter's son as-Salih Ismail. Prior to his first term as governor, al-Jawli briefly served as the Emir of Shawbak in Transjordan and before his second term as Gaza's governor, he was appointed Governor of Hama for three months.

During his rule he engaged in several construction projects throughout Palestine, particularly in Gaza. The latter was transformed from a small and politically insignificant town to a major and prosperous city under his leadership. Following his appointment as Superintendent of the Maristan in Cairo in 1344, al-Jawli successfully quashed a rebellion by Ismail's brother an-Nasir Ahmad in Karak. Afterward, he focused on studying Islamic law, publishing an interpretation of Muslim scholar Imam al-Shafi'i's work prior to his death in 1345.

== Biography ==
=== Early life and military career ===
Al-Jawli was born in 1255 and is thought by 15th-century Mamluk historian Ibn Taghribirdi to be of Kurdish origin. His name "al-Jawli" indicates he was a mamluk (slave soldier) of Jawli, an emir of Baybars, a former Bahri Mamluk sultan. Ibn Taghribirdi asserts al-Jawli was a first generation Muslim and his father was a certain al-Mushid Abdullah.

Following Jawli's death, Sanjar al-Jawli switched allegiances to the house of Sultan Qalawun, and during the reign of the latter's son, Sultan al-Ashraf Khalil (r. 1290–1293), he moved to Karak in southern Transjordan along with the other Bahri Mamluks. When al-Adil Kitbugha usurped the sultanate from Sultan an-Nasir Muhammad (another son of Qalawun) in 1294, al-Jawli was nominated to head the khushkhanah, an elite Mamluk force loyal to the sultan, and left Karak for Cairo. During this time, he became acquainted with Sayf al-Din Salar, whom he would go on to refer to as his "brother." He served as Salar's ustadar al-saghir (lesser majordomo). Under the tutelage of emirs Salar and Baybars II, al-Jawli was appointed the emir of Shawbak, a fortress post south of Karak in 1309. Salar and Baybars II were enemies of an-Nasir Muhammad, who was restored to power in 1299, and were influential in Baybars II's usurpation of the throne in 1309, ending an-Nasir Muhammad's second reign.

Despite his friendship with Salar and Baybars II, al-Jawli remained loyal to the Bahri Mamluks and joined al-Nasir Muhammad in the latter's exile in Karak following his overthrow from the sultanate. In Karak, al-Jawli cultivated a close friendship with an-Nasir Muhammad. Ten months after being exiled, an-Nasir Muhammad wrested back the sultanate from Baybars II in 1310. Al-Jawli, as the na'ib (governor) of Karak, developed the town extensively. He ordered the construction of a palace, a bathhouse, a madrasa (Islamic college), a khan (caravanserai), a mosque and a hospital, transforming Karak into a madina (city).

=== Governor of Gaza and Palestine ===
Later, in 1311, an-Nasir Muhammad appointed al-Jawli na'ib Ghazzah w'l Sahel w'l Jibal, in effect making him the governor of Gaza and the coastal plain and mountainous areas of Palestine, including Jerusalem, Hebron, Jaffa and Jabal Nablus. He held the additional title of Inspector of the Two Harams which referred to the al-Aqsa Mosque and the Ibrahimi Mosque. Largely because of his close relationship with the sultan, al-Jawli was given large iqta (fiefs) and an unusually high income for an emir of his status. According to al-Maqrizi, a Mamluk-era historian, al-Jawli engaged in massive building works in Gaza and is credited for turning the city into a metropolis. He ordered the construction of a castle, a hospital, open-air markets, a caravansary, Islamic schools, mosques and public baths. He also built a horse race course. Al-Jawli highly favored the city and under his rule, Gaza, which had been relatively insignificant during the Crusader and Ayyubid periods, became a flourishing and major city.

Although Tankiz al-Husami was overall governor of Syria, al-Jawli was put in charge of the rawk (cadastral survey) in 1313, recording the land boundaries for the Bilad al-Sham Province, excluding Aleppo and Tripoli. He spent several months in Damascus and was required to mobilize part of the armies of the latter city and Gaza to complete the task. At the beginning of 1314, he presented the completed documents to an-Nasir Muhammad in Cairo.

In 1320 al-Jawli entered into a dispute with Tankiz, concerning a house being sought by Tankiz in Damascus that al-Jawli owned but refused to sell. Sultan al-Nasir Muhammad intervened on the side of Tankiz. Towards the end of that year, al-Jawli was imprisoned for about eight years after allegations of corruption and abuse of power were made against him. In particular, he was accused of distributing favorable iqta'a to himself and his mamluks when he oversaw the cadastral survey of Syria in 1313–14. Following his release in 1329, al-Jawli was given the rank of amir arba'in (emir of forty [mamluks]) and soon afterward was promoted to amir mi'a muqaddam alf (emir of on hundred [mamluks], commander of 1,000 [soldiers]).

Following the sultan's death in 1341, and a brief period of three different short-lived sultans, al-Nasir Muhammad's son as-Salih Ismail, who became sultan in 1342, appointed al-Jawli to be na'ib (governor) of Hama, a post he held for roughly three months before being reappointed governor of Gaza where he also served for about three months.

=== Career in Cairo and death ===
After his Gaza assignment, he was recalled to Cairo, the Mamluk capital, to serve in various high positions within the sultanate, most notably Superintendent of the Maristan. From Cairo he was sent to crush a rebellion by Ismail's brother an-Nasir Ahmad in Karak. Al-Jawli besieged the castle at Karak, destroyed part of its wall and successfully captured Ahmad alive. He thereby decapitated him and sent his head to Ismail. Al-Jawli resumed his duties as Superintendent after returning to Cairo. During this time, and having already been studying Islamic law, he wrote an interpretation of the works of Imam al-Shafi'i. Al-Jawli attained a high enough position in Muslim scholarship that he was entrusted the authority to issue fatawa (religious edicts) according to the Shafi'i madh'hab ("school of law").

On 14 January 1345, al-Jawli peacefully died at the age of 90. He is buried in a mausoleum within the Madrasa wa Khanqah Salar wa Sanjar, which he built in Cairo in 1304. His tomb sits alongside the tomb of Salar.

== Architectural legacy ==
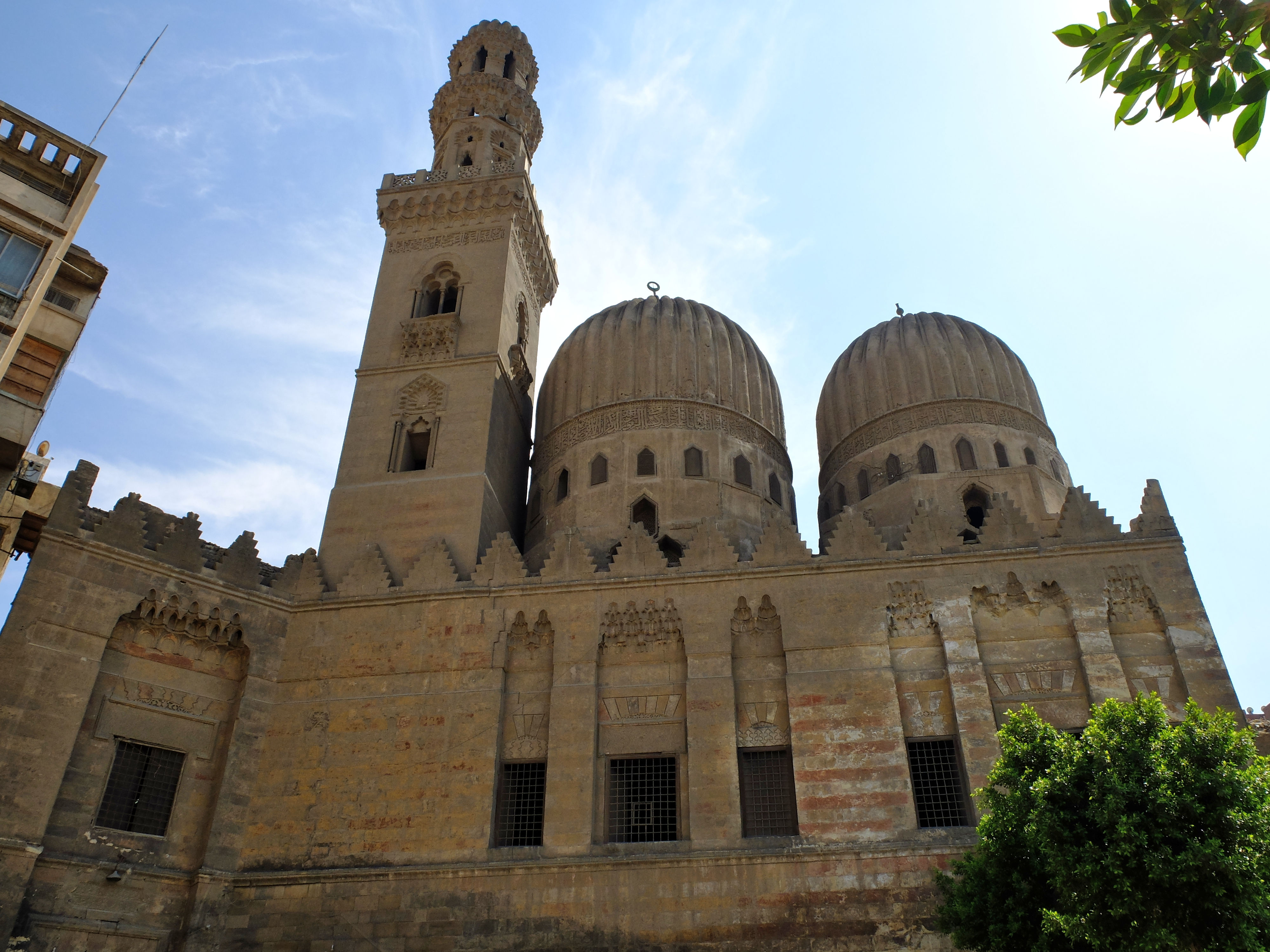
The Tomb and Madrasa and Sanjar and his friend Salar in Cairo

During his governorship of Palestine, al-Jawli embarked on a series of architectural projects, particularly in his capital Gaza but in the interior towns as well. He also constructed several buildings in Cairo where he lived towards the end of his life.

Along Saliba Street in Medieval Cairo near the Mosque of Ibn Tulun, al-Jawli founded the Khanqah wa Madrasa Salar wa Sanjar al-Jawli in 1304. The extensive complex, which was designed in an Aleppine architectural style, served as a mosque, a madrasa for the Shafi'i madhab, a khanqah for the Sufi community and a joint mausoleum for al-Jawli and his longtime friend Sayf al-Din Salar. Al-Jawli had Salar's tomb built larger and more ornate than his own as a testament to his respect for Salar.

In Gaza, al-Jawli ordered the construction of Masjid al-Hilweh (the Beautiful Mosque) which was later destroyed. Following its destruction, the inscription entailing the history of the mosque and its founder was transferred to the Sham'ah Mosque located in another part of the city. Prior to his governorship, the Mongols had destroyed the Great Mosque of Gaza during their brief invasion in 1260. In 1318 al-Jawli commissioned the Great Mosque's reconstruction and endowed in his name and al-Nasir Muhammad's. In 1320 he had the Hamam al-Malih built in Gaza's Zeitoun Quarter and today it serves as the only operating hammam (bathhouse) in the city. Other works include the construction of a madrasa (Islamic law school) for the Shafi'i madh'hab, a khan (caravansary) and a maristan (hospital.) The latter was endowed in the name of then-sultan al-Nasir Muhammad and a provision was made that the hospital should always be under the supervision of Gaza's governors.

Al-Jawli undertook other building projects throughout Palestine. In Hebron, he built the Amir Sanjar al-Jawli Mosque, named after him, with a ceiling of "beautifully dressed stone" according to al-Maqrizi. In the coastal plain town of Qaqun al-Jawli ordered the construction of a large caravansary in 1315. In 1320 he founded the Jawliyya Madrasa in Jerusalem. Al-Jawli built a smaller caravansary at Qaryat al-Kathib, a stopping point between Jerusalem and Jericho, and at the forest of Arsuf an archway (qanatir) was constructed. At al-Hamra, near the town of Baysan, al-Jawli ordered the construction of Khan Salar ("Caravansary of Salar"), named in honor of his friend Salar, a former leader of the Mamluk army.

== Bibliography ==
- Amiran, David H. K. (1973). Atlas of Jerusalem. ואלטר דה גרויטר. ISBN 9783110036237.
- Lapidus, I.M. (1984). Muslim cities in the later Middle Ages. CUP Archive. ISBN 0-521-27762-0.
- Mayer, L.A. (1933). Saracenic Heraldry: A Survey. Oxford: Oxford University Press. (Mayer, 1933, pp. 60, 197, 198 n 1; his buildings, 198)
- Meyer, Martin Abraham (1907). History of the city of Gaza: from the earliest times to the present day. Columbia University Press. p. 84. "Nasir Gaza."
- Sato, Tsugitaka (1997). State and Rural Society in Medieval Islam: Sultans, Muqtaʻs, and Fallahun. BRILL. ISBN 90-04-10649-9.
- Sharon, M. (2009). Handbook of Oriental Studies: The Near and Middle East. Corpus inscriptionum Arabicarum Palaestinae. BRILL. ISBN 978-90-04-17085-8.
- Williams, Caroline (2008). Islamic monuments in Cairo. American University of Cairo Press. ISBN 978-977-416-205-3.
