= Tomb of Salar and Sangar al-Gawli =

Historic Mamluk-era monument in Cairo, Egypt

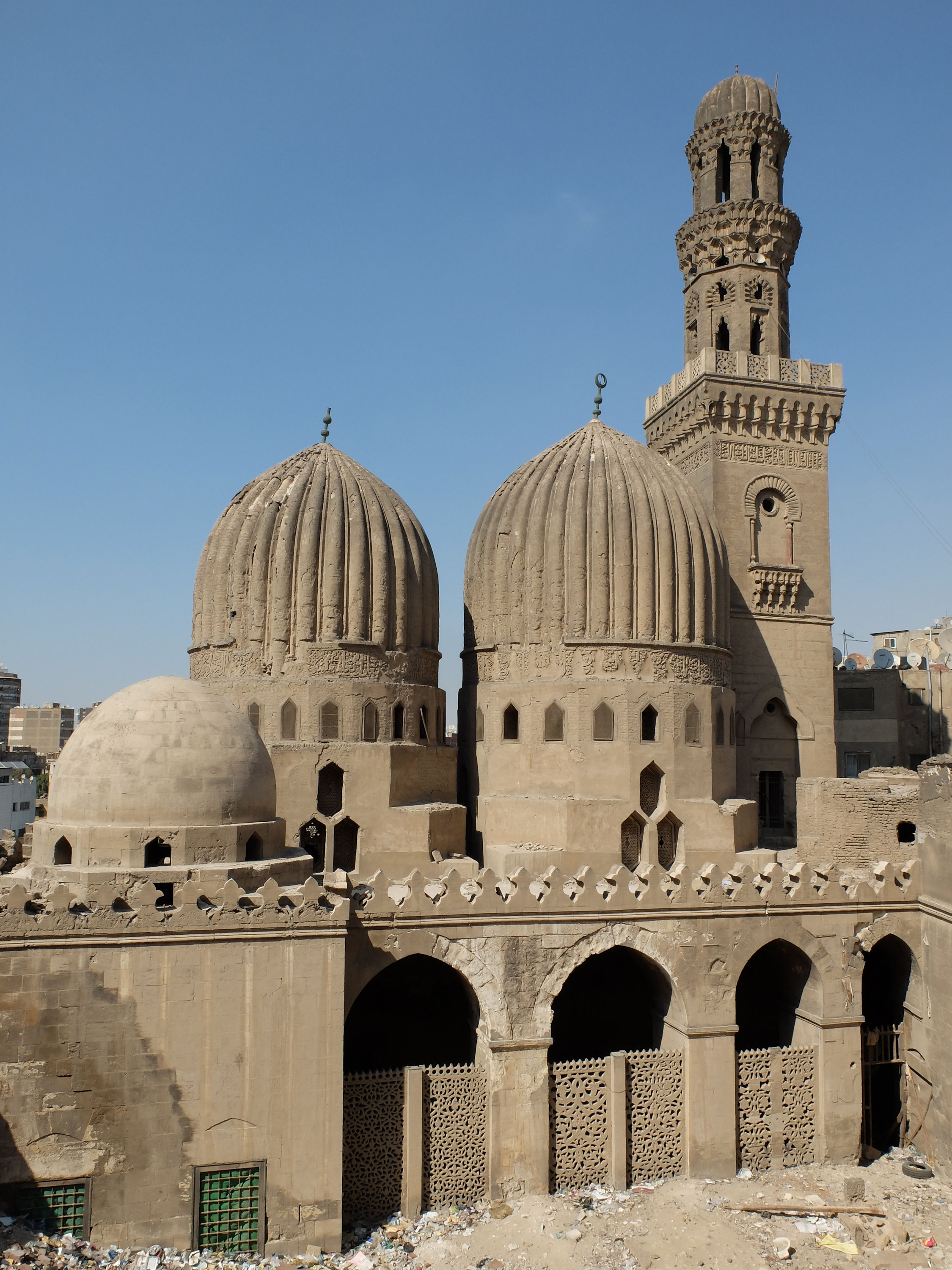

- Location within Egypt

Religion
- Affiliation: Islam
- Year consecrated: 1303–4

Location
- Location: Cairo, Egypt
- Coordinates: 30°3′29″N 31°13′44″E

Architecture
- Type: mausoleum, madrasa, khanqah
- Style: Mamluk architecture
- Founder: Sanjar al-Jawli

Specifications
- Dome: 3
- Minaret: 1

The Tomb of Salar and Sangar al-Gawli is a historic funerary and religious complex located in Cairo, Egypt. It was built on the slopes of the hill called Gabal Yashkur (Jabal Yashkur) and overlooks the historic Saliba Street. The complex contains the tombs of Sayf al-Din Salar and A'lam al-Din Sanjar al-Jawli, who were Mamluk emirs in the 14th century. Its notable architectural features include the decoration of the mausoleum chambers, the minaret, and the unique carved stone screens between the mausoleum access corridor and the outer courtyard. Currently, the complex is abandoned and in poor condition.

== History ==
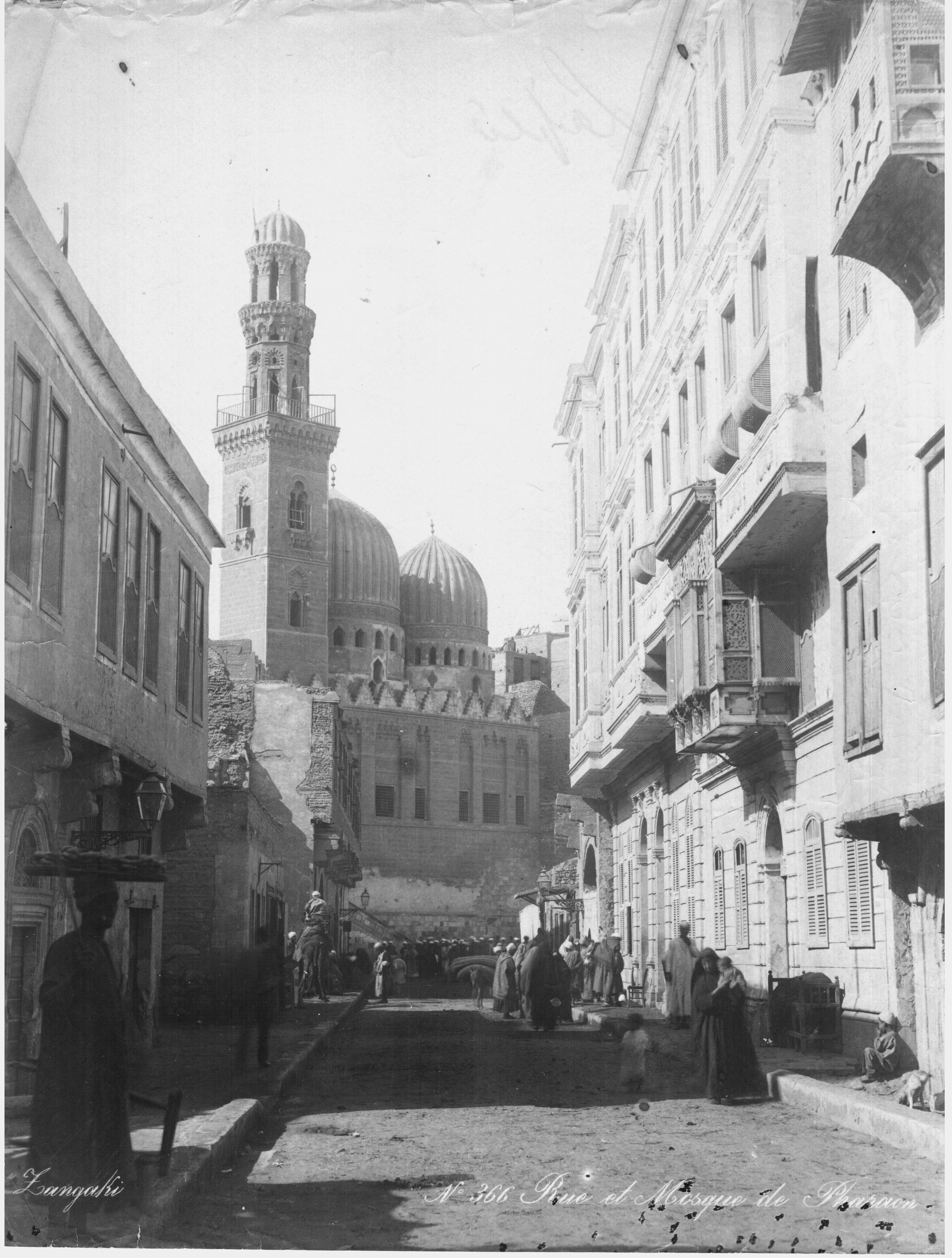
Historic photo (date unknown) of the complex as seen along Saliba Street

The complex was founded in 1303–4 by the amir (commander) Sangar al-Gawli (or Sanjar al-Jawli; Arabic: سنجر الجولي). Sangar was a mamluk who began his career under Sultan Baybars and became an amir during Sultan al-Nasir Muhammad's second reign. He remained one of the latter's favourite amirs until his death. Sangar amassed a large fortune and his own palace originally stood next to this funerary complex. His mentor, Salar, died in 1310 and was buried in the larger and more richly decorated of the two tomb chambers in the complex. Sangar himself died in 1345, close to one hundred years of age, and was buried in the other tomb chamber.

Another small domed mausoleum, built in stone, is located at the western end of the complex and was added slightly later, in 1341. The cenotaph inside does not allow for the identification of the tomb's occupant, though it was most likely Bashtak, another amir of al-Nasir Muhammad, who died in 1341 and was buried in this complex in 1347–8.

Due to the loss of the original waqf documents, the exact original function of the building is uncertain. The carved inscriptions on the monument himself only describe it as a makan (Arabic: مكان, lit. 'place'), which typically referred to a secular building or mausoleum. Apart from the two mausoleums, the other hall attached to the complex may have served as either a madrasa for training Islamic scholars or a khanqah for Sufis. Al-Maqrizi, a 14th-century author who lived slightly later, claimed that it included both of these functions.

Art historian Doris Behrens-Abouseif suggests that the original function of the building may have been simply a mausoleum, given that only the tomb chambers are aligned with the qibla (direction of prayer) and no mihrab was originally included in the attached hall (though a mihrab was later added in modern times). The fact that Sangar's palace stood nearby could signify that parts of the complex were intended for his own use. Religious services for Sufis and others may have been added to the complex at a later period. Bernard O'Kane argues that the founder most likely intended for prayers to be held within the building from the start, considering that it features a prominent minaret.

The monument was restored by the Comité in 1894. Today, it is in a poor condition and in need of repairs and restoration. The site has been abandoned and is no longer used for prayers. In 2014, a historic wooden frieze was stolen from Salar's mausoleum. According to a 2017 report, the grave of Sayf al-Din Salar is no longer visible within the ruined complex. Another report in 2018 noted that the building was being used by drug addicts at night, prompting safety concerns from local residents.

== Architecture ==
=== Exterior and entrances ===
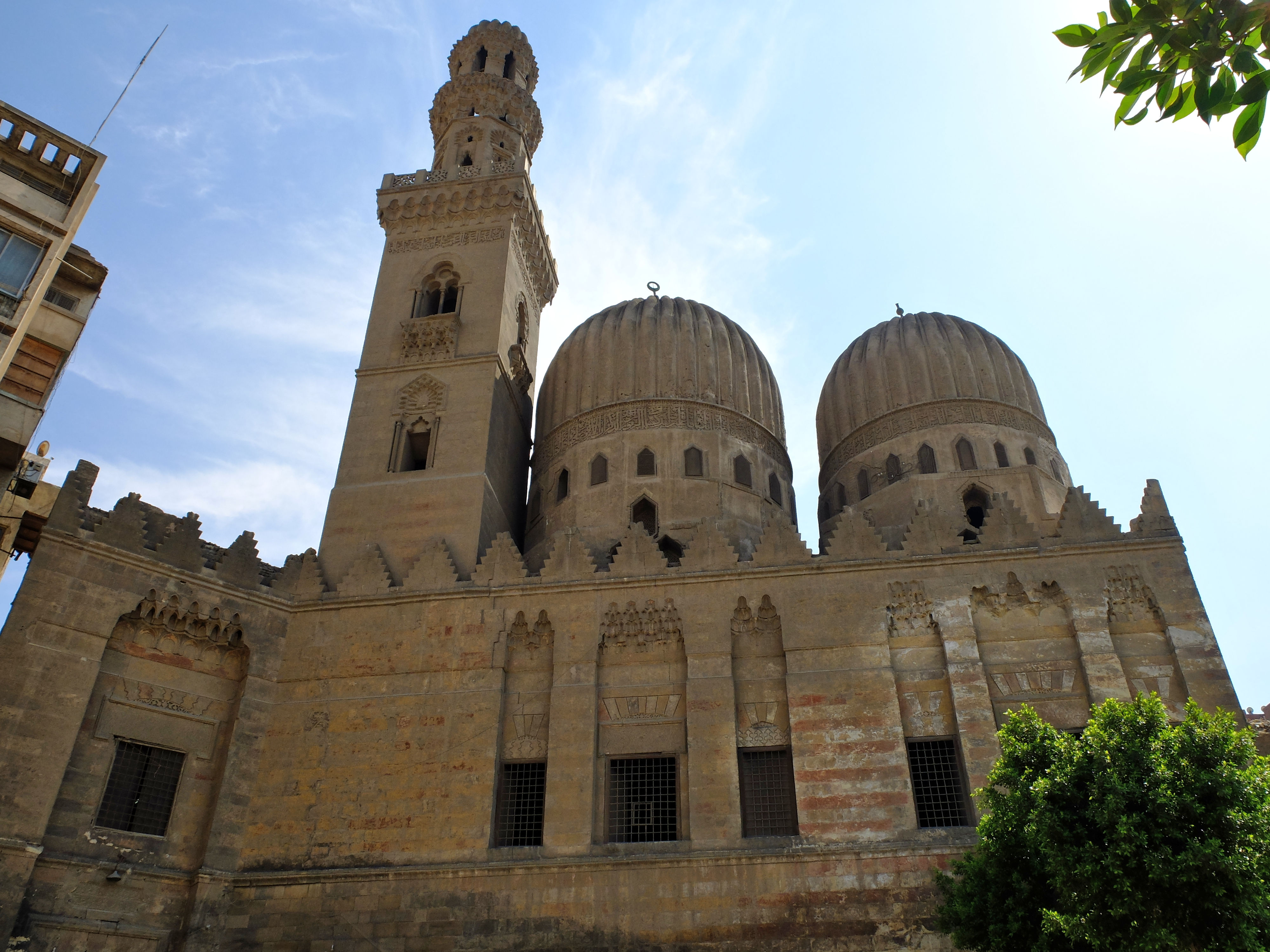
The northern street façade of the complex, with the entrance portal on the left

The complex is built into the hillside of Jabal Yashkur, with its north side overlooking Saliba Street below. Due to both this elevated setting and to its composition, the north façade is very imposing and towers over the street. Unlike many other Mamluk monuments, it does not feature a prominent entrance portal. The entrance is a doorway reached by a steep staircase from the street and set within a relatively simple recess topped by muqarnas. An carved stone inscription above the doorway contains an excerpt from the Qur'an, Surah 9:18. The mausoleum windows along the rest of the façade are also set within shallow recesses with muqarnas canopies. Another smaller entrance is located at the rear of the complex, on the slope above it, and leads down to it through a staircase and corridor. From the main street entrance, a staircase inside leads up to the main level. The floor plan here has two main sections.

=== Funerary section ===
One of the two main parts of the complex, the northwestern part, is the funerary section. From the entrance stairway, a corridor covered by cross-vaults runs northwest. On its north side are two doorways leading into the two mausoleum chambers, which are also connected to each other via two other doorways. The first (southeast) chamber belongs to Salar's tomb and is larger and more decorated, while the second (northwest) chamber belongs to Sangar. Both chambers are covered by brick domes. On the outside, the domes are ribbed and they begin to curve only at about one third of their height. Their drums are pierced by a row of windows and above these are large inscription bands, executed in carved stucco, which wrap around the base of each dome. On the inside, the domes are plain and they transition to the square chamber below through an array of muqarnas squinches. The muqarnas have three tiers of cells and are interrupted in the middle of each wall by a triangular array of windows with the same profile as the muqarnas cells.

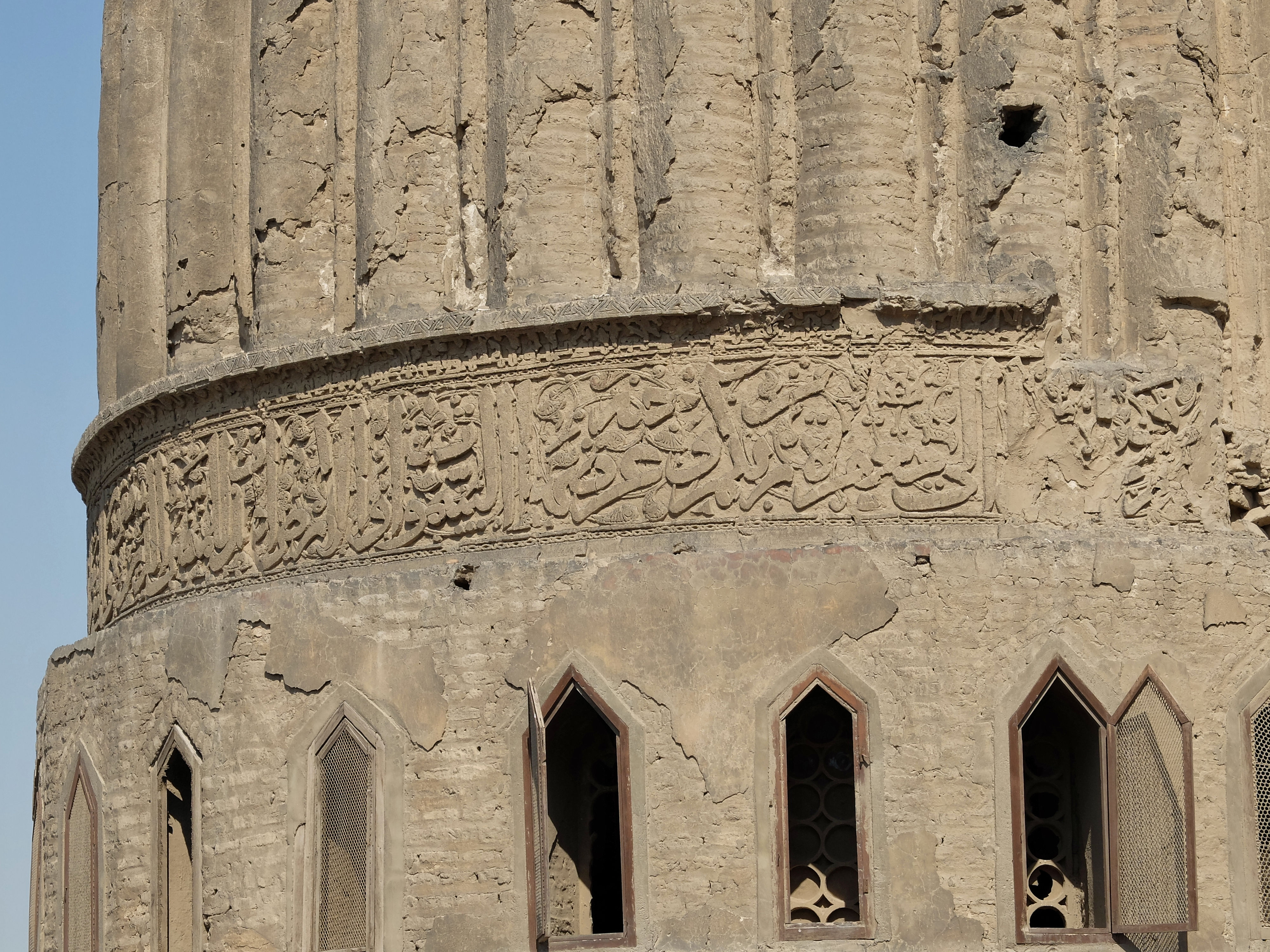
Detail of inscription on the dome of Sanjar's tomb chamber

Salar's mausoleum chamber has rich decoration, mostly focused around the mihrab on the qibla wall (southeastern wall). The lower zone of the mihrab niche is panelled with inlaid marble, mostly in relatively simple motifs, while the upper part of the mihrab (the conch or semi-dome) is inlaid with marble mosaic in a complex geometric motif derived from twelve-pointed stars. The conch is surrounded by a zone of alternating black and white marble (ablaq), while the spandrels on either side are decorated with the same geometric mosaic motif as the one inside the conch. Between the upper and lower parts of the mihrab, and running all around the entire walls of the chamber, is a horizontal band of very fine marble mosaic inlay with a motif consisting primarily of lozenges and teardrop-like polygons. Additionally, above the level of the mihrab and wrapping around its decorative composition were two other friezes: a lower or interior frieze of stone carved with a spiralling scroll or vine motif, and another wooden frieze carved with an Arabic inscription. Both of these friezes were removed and stolen in 2014. Another inscription frieze above this, in carved stone, is still present. The inscriptions in the chamber include excerpts from the Qur'an, Surah 3:181-191. Salar's cenotaph is also encased by a carved wood screen.

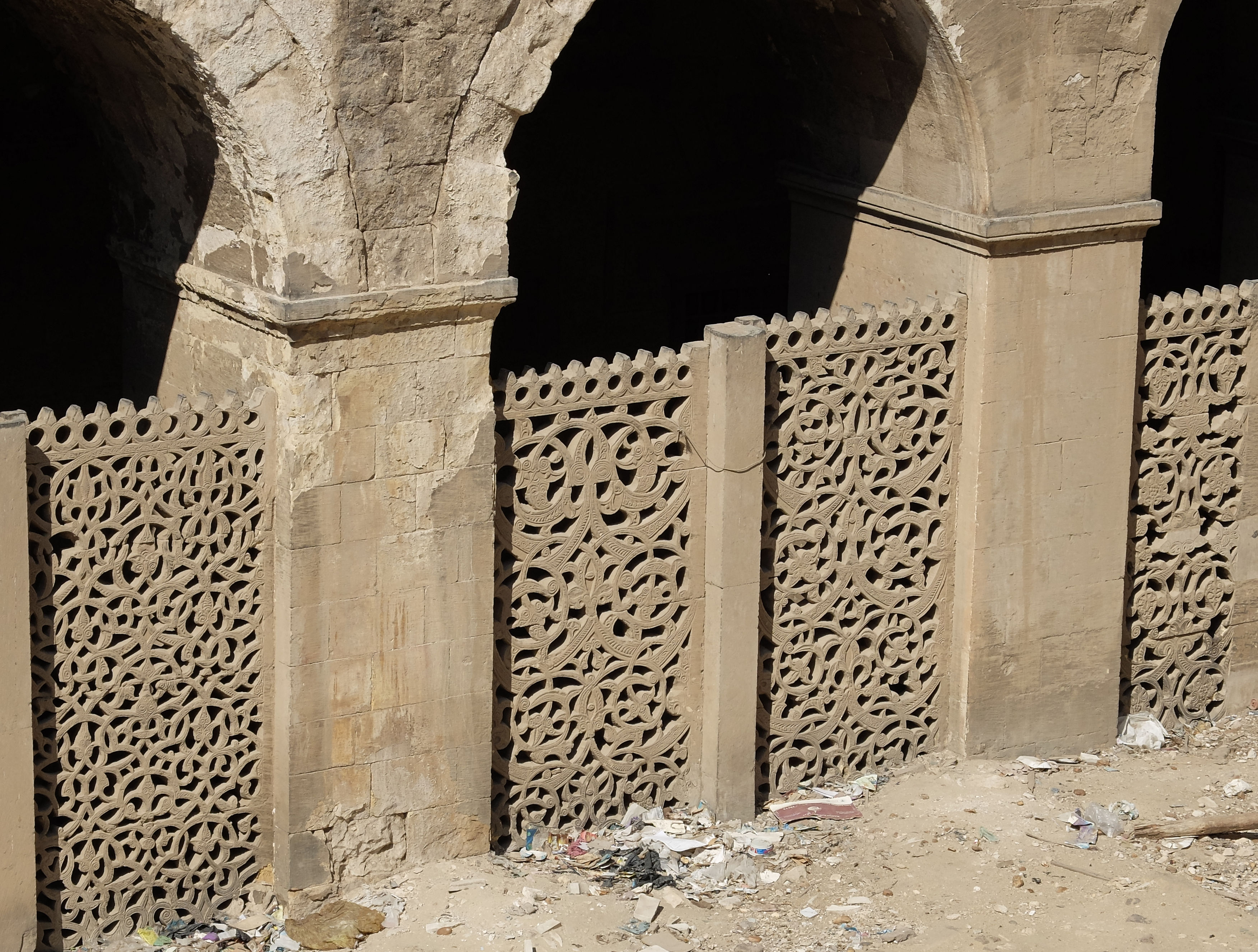
View of the carved and pierced stone screens between the funerary corridor and the courtyard

Sanjar's slightly smaller mausoleum chamber is more plain and less decorated. The mihrab is not inlaid with marble but its conch is carved with fluting that radiates out from the summit of the semi-dome and terminates below in a row of small niches, a detail not found in other mihrabs in Cairo. Another carved stone inscription band runs around the walls of the chamber, featuring a Qur'anic excerpt from Surah 2:284-286. The dome above features a muqarnas transition similar to that of Salar's dome. At the center of the room is Sanjar's marble cenotaph. Past the two main mausoleums, at the end of the access corridor, is small square chamber covered by a plain stone dome. It was likely used as burial chamber for the Mamluk emir Bashtak who died in 1341.

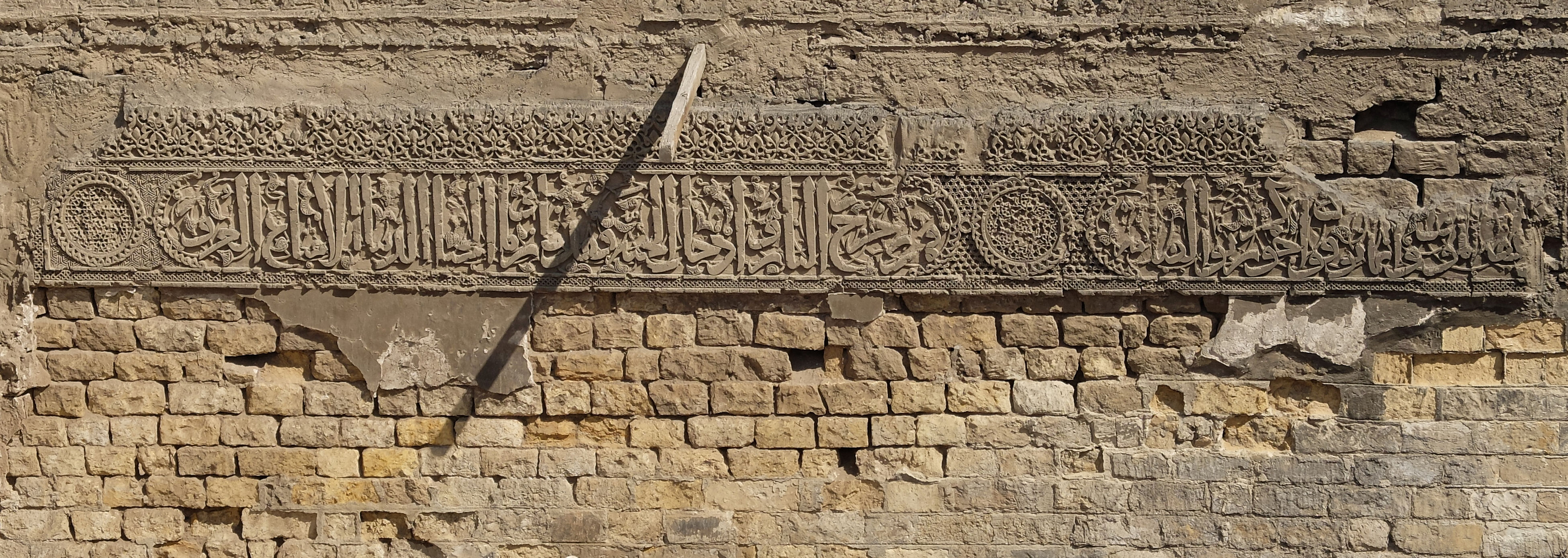
The carved stucco inscription on the east wall of the courtyard

One of the most unique and remarkable features of the complex are the four stone screens on the southwest side of the access corridor (across from the mausoleum entrances), separating the corridor from an open courtyard on the other side. These stone screens are composed of carved openwork, each with different ornate floral motif, such as a palmette motif and a vine-with-grapes motif. The outside courtyard beyond this is partially filled with rubble today. The eastern wall preserves an ornate inscription band in finely carved stucco as well as a small stucco mihrab niche. The top edge of the courtyard's northwestern façade, fronting the mausoleums, features a decorative crenellations with a triple-leafed or vaguely fleur-de-lis-style shape, which was not previously in fashion.

=== Madrasa or khanqah section ===
The other main section of the complex, along with the entrances, occupies its southeastern part. The original purpose of this entire section is not clear. It may have been either a khanqah or a madrasa. It has a rectangular courtyard surrounded on three sides by small rooms distributed on two levels, which would have been used as living quarters.) The courtyard is roofed today but was likely open to the sky originally. The second-floor rooms have windows with stone screens or grilles, similar in technique to the stone screens of the funerary section, that would have allowed light into them. On the east side of this courtyard is slightly smaller and raised rectangular hall measuring 9.3 by 8.7 metres (31 by 29 ft). It has a mihrab on its southern wall but this was a modern addition; the hall itself is not oriented to the qibla (direction of prayer) and the added mihrab is angled on a different axis from the rest of the room as a result. On the north side of this hall is a smaller iwan or vaulted hall that opens onto it.

=== Minaret ===
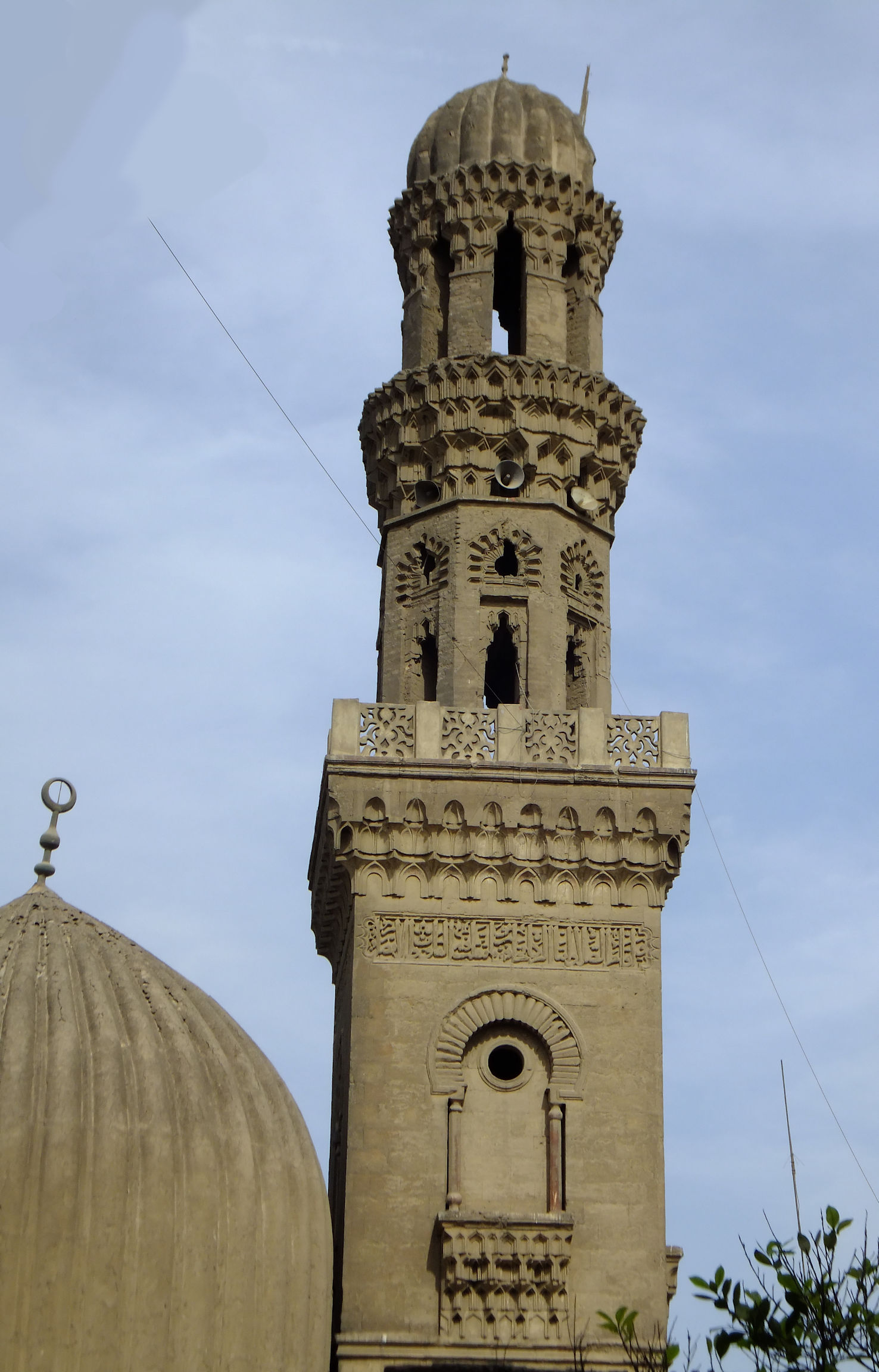
Closer view of the minaret (southwestern side)

The minaret, made of stone, is a significant piece in the evolution of minarets in medieval Cairo. It partly resembles the earlier minaret of Sultan Qalawun's mausoleum at Bayn al-Qasrayn but some of its details, such as its more slender proportions and its lantern-like summit, presage the developments of later minarets. One unusual feature of the minaret, found elsewhere only in the Mosque of Emir Bashtak (1340), is a marked entrance portal at the bottom of its shaft, where one accesses the interior staircase that climbs to the top. The portal here has a trilobed arch shape and includes two side benches.

The shaft of the tower consists of three tiers: a rectangular or cuboid lower tier, an octagonal middle tier, and a cylindrical top tier, each of which is crested by a crown of muqarnas. On one side of the lower tier is a window set within a trilobed frame flanked by colonnettes, rising above a projecting cornice or balcony of muqarnas. On the other side is a round window set within a similar composition, but this time with a horseshoe-arch frame instead of a trilobed shape. Above the level of these windows is an inscription band that runs on all four sides, featuring a Qur'anic excerpt from Surah 24:36. The highest tier features a lantern-like design topped by a slightly bulbous ribbed dome. This style, often known as mabkhara, was new at the time but reappeared afterwards and eventually evolved into the more open lantern and finial design of later Mamluk minarets.

== See also ==
- Late medieval domes
