= Al-Hamra, Baysan =

Al-Hamra الحمرا
- Etymology: Name of local tribe
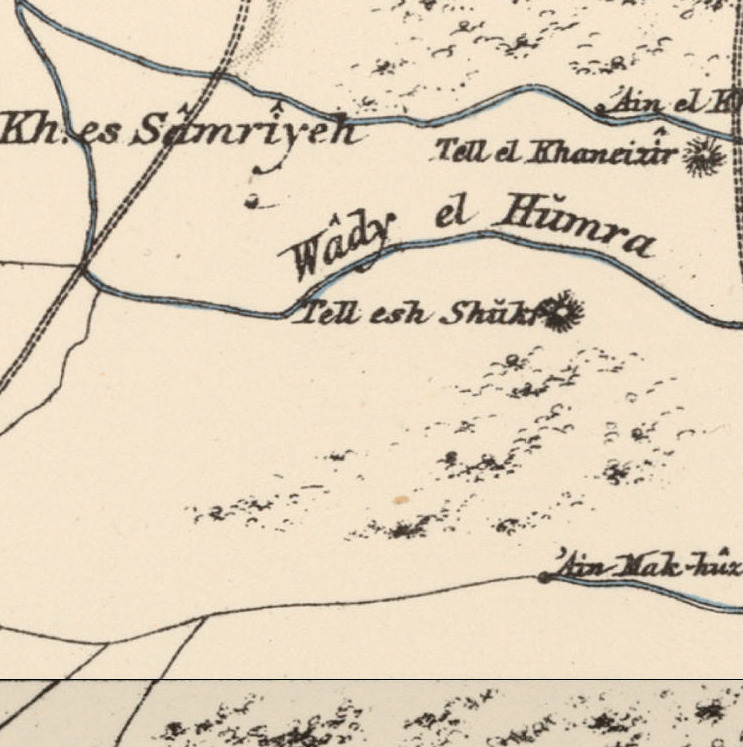
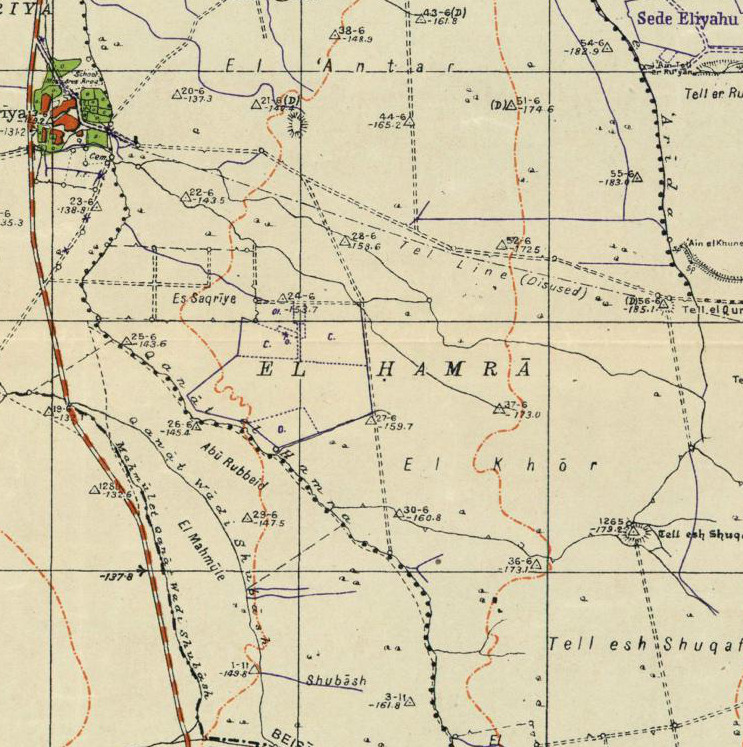
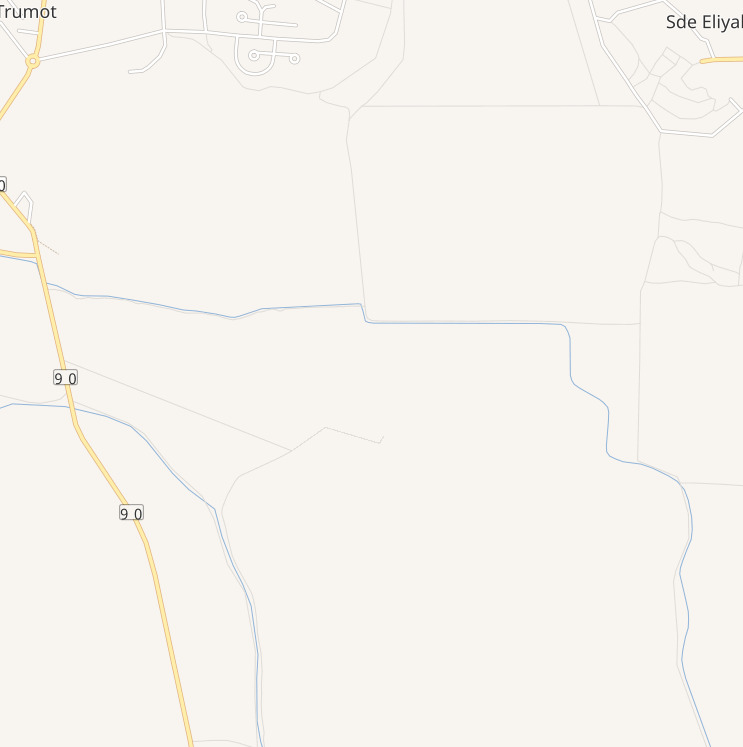
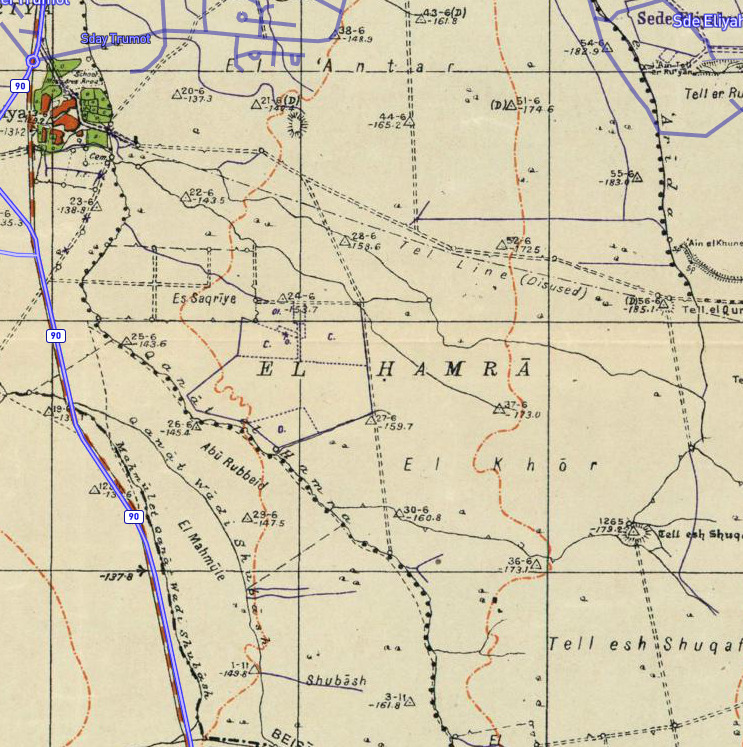
- 1870s map 1940s map modern map 1940s with modern overlay map A series of historical maps of the area around Al-Hamra, Baysan (click the buttons)

- Location within Mandatory Palestine
- Coordinates: 32°25′40″N 35°30′01″E
- Palestine grid: 196/204
- Geopolitical entity: Mandatory Palestine
- Subdistrict: Baysan
- Date of depopulation: May 31, 1948

Area
  - Total: 11.5 km^{2} (4.4 sq mi)

Population (1945)
  - Total: 730

Al-Hamra (Arabic: الحمرا), was a Palestinian Arab village in the District of Baysan. It was located 7.5 kilometres south of Baysan. It was depopulated by the Israeli Army during the 1948 Arab-Israeli War. The village was named after the Bedouin tribe who settled in the village lands centuries ago. The population in 1945 was 730, expanding to 847 in 1948.

In 1945 the village's total land area was recorded as 11,511 dunams, 8,623 of which was Arab owned while 2,153 duname were owned by Jews with the remainder being public property. Al-Hamra was situated 175 meters below sea level.

== History ==
There are archaeological sites located just east of the village that are traced back to the era of the Canaanites, particularly the tells of Abu Kharaj and al-Shuqaf.

Al-Hamra receives its name from the al-Hamra clan, a branch of the al-Suqur ("the Falcons") tribe. According to Walid Khalidi, the al-Hamra clan settled in the area several centuries ago because of its abundant water supplies and fertile soil. The first reference to the village was in 1281 when Qalawun, the Bahri Mamluk sultan, traveled through it on his way to Egypt from Syria. During the rule of Sanjar al-Jawli (Governor of Gaza and much of Palestine from 1311-20 and 1329) he ordered the construction of Khan Salar, a caravansary named after his friend, the former viceroy of the sultanate Emir Salar.

=== British Mandate era ===
During the beginning of the 20th-century, al-Hamra's homes were widely scattered and were either permanent adobe brick structures or camel-hair tents. The village's main crops were grain, oranges, olives and vegetables.

In the 1945 statistics, in the British Mandate era, Al-Hamra had a population of 730 Muslims and the total land area was 11,511 dunums. Of this, Arabs used 32 dunams for irrigated areas and plantations, 8,427 was used for cereals, while 733 dunams were uncultivable.

=== 1948, aftermath ===
No visible structures remained in the village since its depopulation by Israeli forces in 1948. Trees, including fig groves, cacti and grass covered the site when Khalidi visited in the early 1990s.

== Bibliography ==
- Government of Palestine, Department of Statistics (1945). Village Statistics, April, 1945.
- Hadawi, S. (1970). Village Statistics of 1945: A Classification of Land and Area ownership in Palestine. Palestine Liberation Organization Research Center. Archived from the original on 2018-12-08.
- Khalidi, W. (1992). All That Remains:The Palestinian Villages Occupied and Depopulated by Israel in 1948. Washington D.C.: Institute for Palestine Studies. ISBN 0-88728-224-5.
- Morris, B. (2004). The Birth of the Palestinian Refugee Problem Revisited. Cambridge University Press. ISBN 978-0-521-00967-6.
- Sharon, M. (2009). Corpus Inscriptionum Arabicarum Palaestinae, G. Vol. 4. BRILL. ISBN 978-90-04-17085-8.
