= Khanqah of Baybars II =

Medieval Islamic complex in Cairo, Egypt

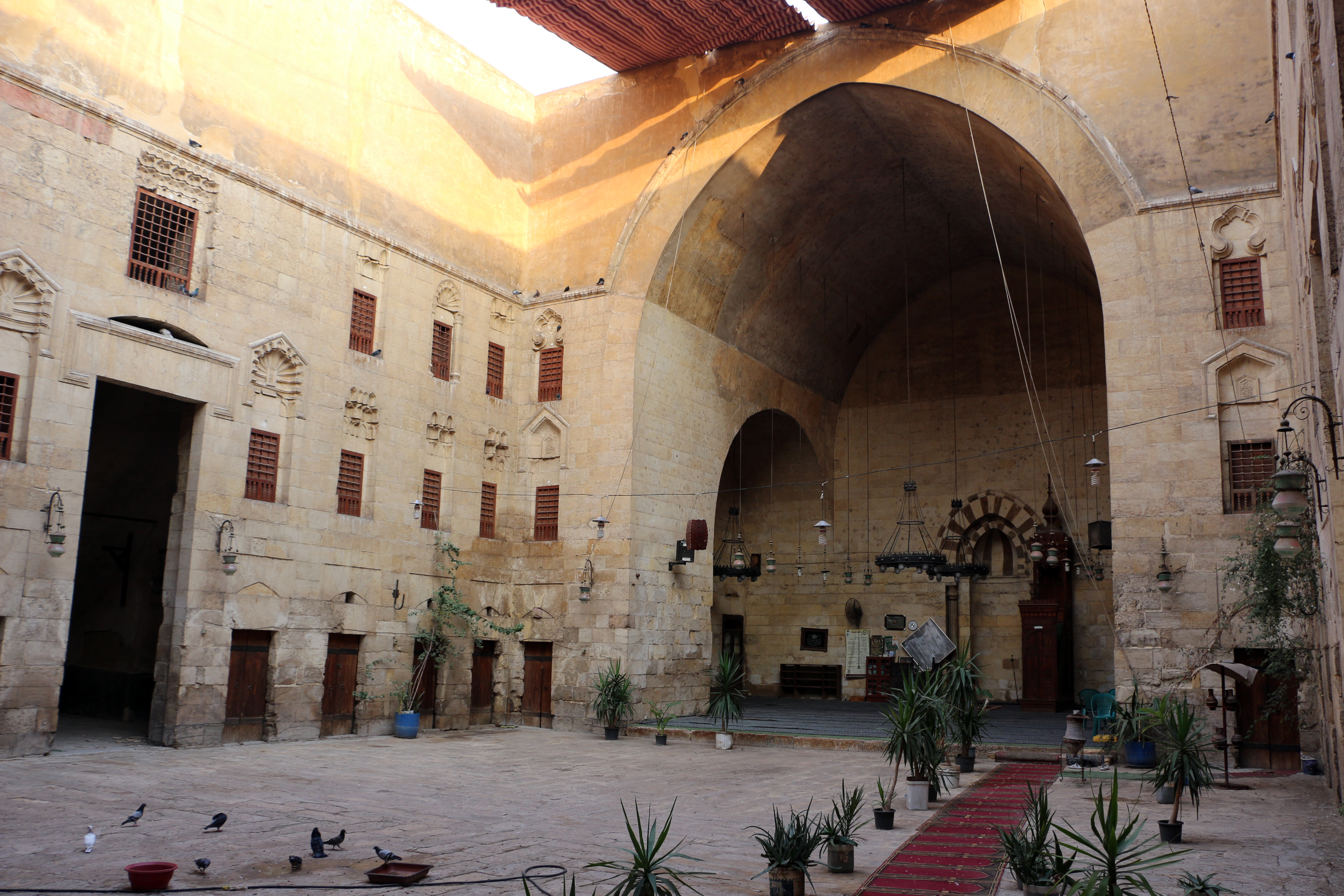

Religion
- Affiliation: Sunni Islam
- Sect: Sufism
- Ecclesiastical or organisational status: Khanqah

Location
- Location: Islamic Cairo
- Country: Egypt
- Interactive map of Khanqah of Baybars II
- Coordinates: 30°03′6″N 31°15′50″E

Architecture
- Founder: Baibars II
- Groundbreaking: 1306 CE
- Completed: 1310 CE

Specifications
- Dome: 1
- Minaret: 1
- Shrine: 1: Baibars II
- Materials: Marble

The Khanqah of Baybars II is a khanqah, or convent, located in the historic Sharia Gamaliya, in Islamic Cairo, Egypt. Built between 1306 CE and 1310 to accommodate four hundred Sufis and children of the Mamluk Sultanate, it is the oldest khanqah that has survived in modern Cairo.

== History ==
Baibars al-Jashankir (Arabic: بيبرس الجاشنكير) or Baibars II (d.1310, Cairo) (royal name: al-Malik al-Muzaffar Rukn al-Din Baibars al-Jashankir al-Mansuri; الملك المظفر ركن الدين بيبرس الجاشنكير المنصورى), whose nickname was Abu al-Fath (أبوالفتح), was known as al-gashankir, "the taster", a court position he held at one point. He served as the Atabek of Egypt and after the death of Emir Salar, he became the Sultan of Egypt in 1309.

Baibars II commissioned the building in 1307 when he was still an amir. The minaret, iwan, and mausoleum were completed by Baybars in 709 AH (1309/1310 CE). In the same year, Sultan al-Nasir Muhammad, at the beginning of his third and longest reign (r. 1309–1340), closed the complex when Baybars was killed. al-Nasir Muhammad reopened the complex in 1325 and ordered Baybars' name to be removed from the tiraz.

== Architecture ==
The site includes a khanqah, a ribat (no longer extant), and associated structures that comprise Baybars' funerary complex. Within the confines of the irregular site, the various functions of the khanqah were interwoven into an architecturally rich building complex. The elegant facade has an imposing arched entrance that projects into the street. The doorway is set back in a marble recess covered with a hood of stalactites. A block of pharaonic stone engraved with hieroglyphics was used for the doorsill.

The minaret, capped with a ribbed dome that was once covered with green faience tiles, is located on the south side of the building. The first tier is square and trimmed with rows of stalactites, or Muqarnas vaulting, while the second is cylindrical.

== See also ==
- Islam in Egypt
- List of Historic Monuments in Cairo
- List of mausoleums in Cairo
- Late medieval domes
