= Mabkhara =

Type of censer originating in the Arabian Peninsula

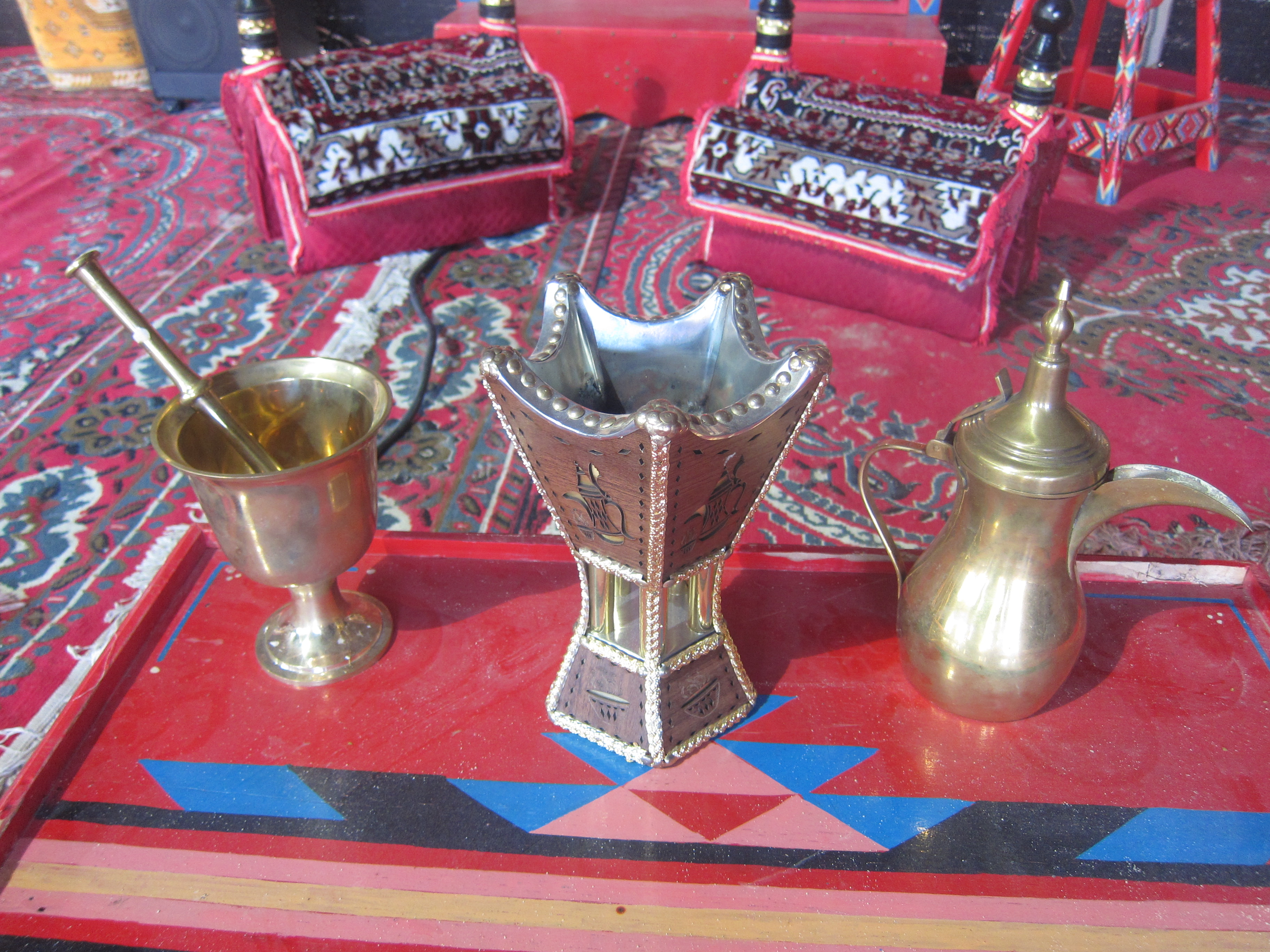
Various forms of mabkhara used in Saudi Arabia.

A mabkhara (Arabic: مبخر or مبخرة [mabxara]; plural mabakhir), also called mujmarah (مجمرة) is a censer found across the Muslim world. The word is derived from "bakhoor," which is the incense burned inside the mabkhara itself. The concept of mabkhara originates from the Arabian Peninsula and has existed since pre-Islamic times, even if not under the same name as now. The Somali version of this concept is known as the dabqaad and the idea may have been brought to Somalia via Arab traders and Muslim immigrants to the place in its early history.

A typical mabkhara has a square pedestal base with inward sloping sides which support a square cup with outward sloping sides; all with a cuboid exterior. The wooden base is often carved out to form legs, while the cup itself is lined with sheet metal. The exterior can be made with any hard object, such as clay or terracotta. The post-Ottoman and modern variations of mabkhara, on the other hand, have an exterior made from shiny metals and do not follow the traditional square shape; with most having a rounded or even spherical exterior. Both traditional and modern mabakhir can range in height from being a few centimeters to a few feet tall.

== Usage ==
As the name suggests, a mabkhara is a censer, a vessel where the bakhoor incense will burn within it. Mabakhir are typically used in places to produce a rich, aromatic smoke which perfumes the surroundings and eliminates any unpleasant odors. They are commonly used in mosques and other Islamic religious institutions. Usage of mabkhara is not limited to Muslim or Arabic contexts; synagogues in the Levant had also been known to use mabakhir in a limited presence until the end of the 19th century when a group of Karaite scholars denounced it as potentially being a form of idolatry.

== Mabkhara as an architectural form ==
The shape of mabkhara is also an architectural form, with minarets of the Ayyubid period in Egypt being designed after local mabkhara. A surviving example is the minaret of the Khanqah of Baybars al-Jashankir in Cairo. Large-scale functional representations of mabkhara have also been found in the United Arab Emirates and Oman, although these are modern constructions.

== Gallery ==
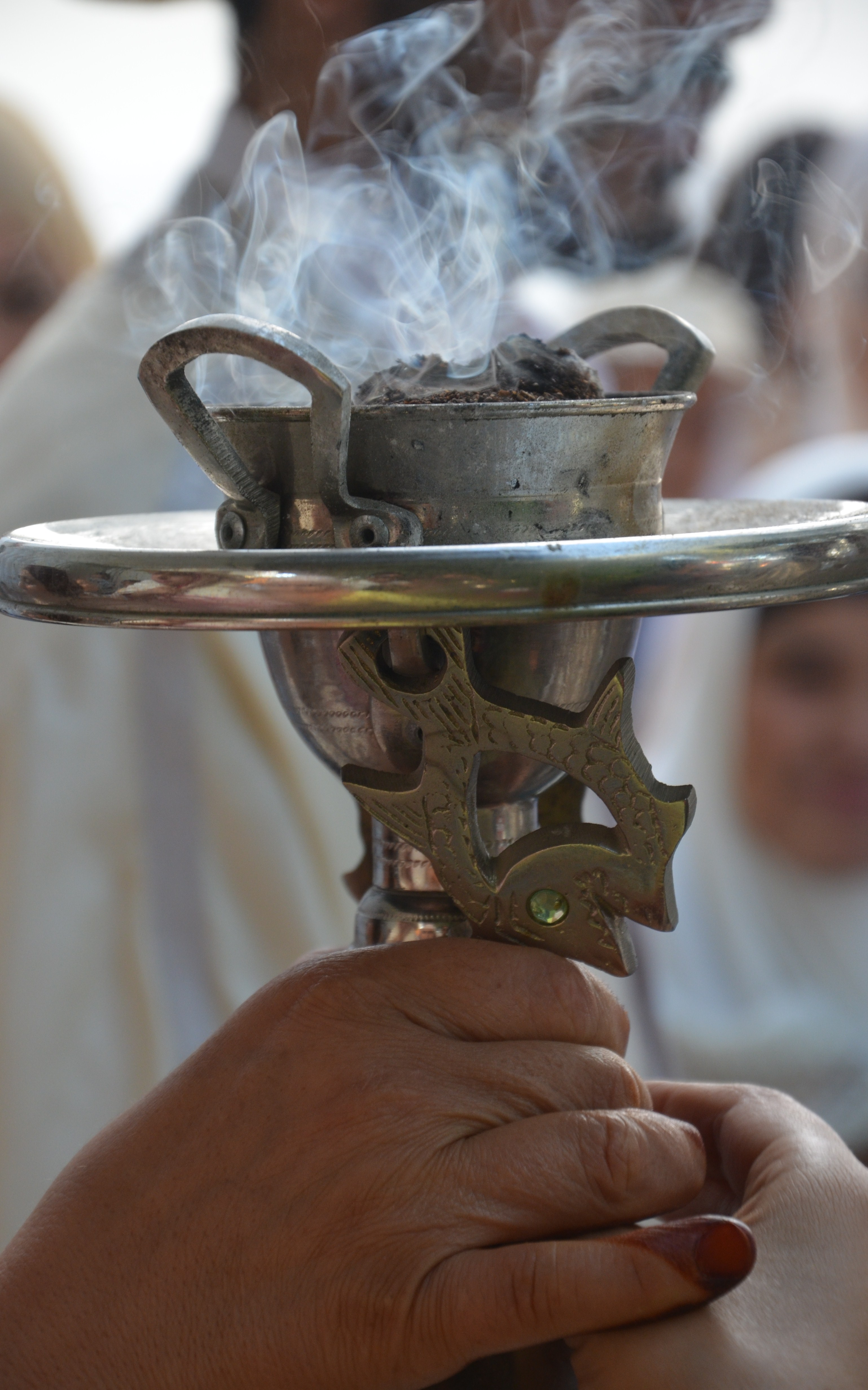
A man holds up a mabkhara that is in use.

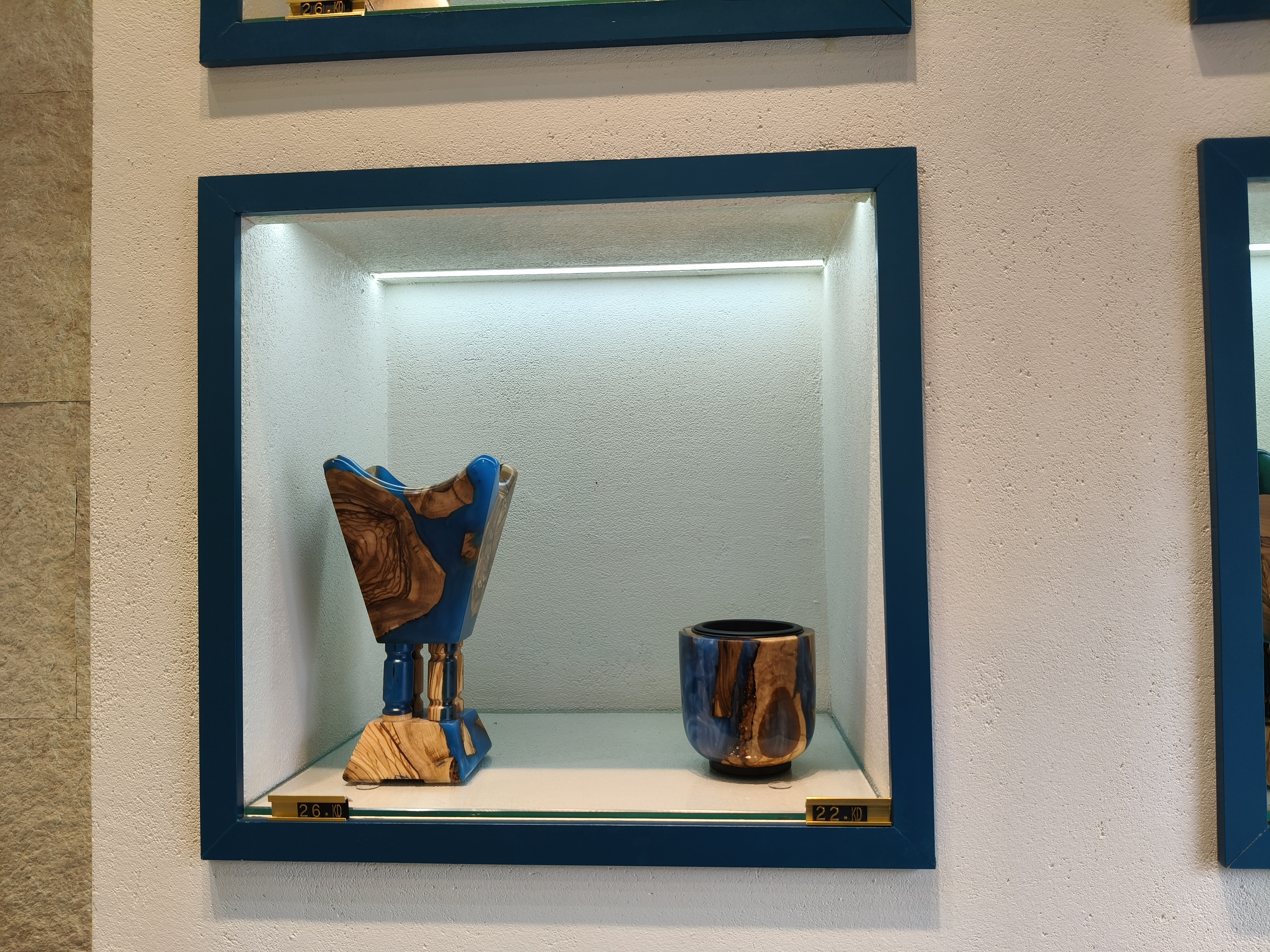
Mabakhir on display at a museum in Kuwait.

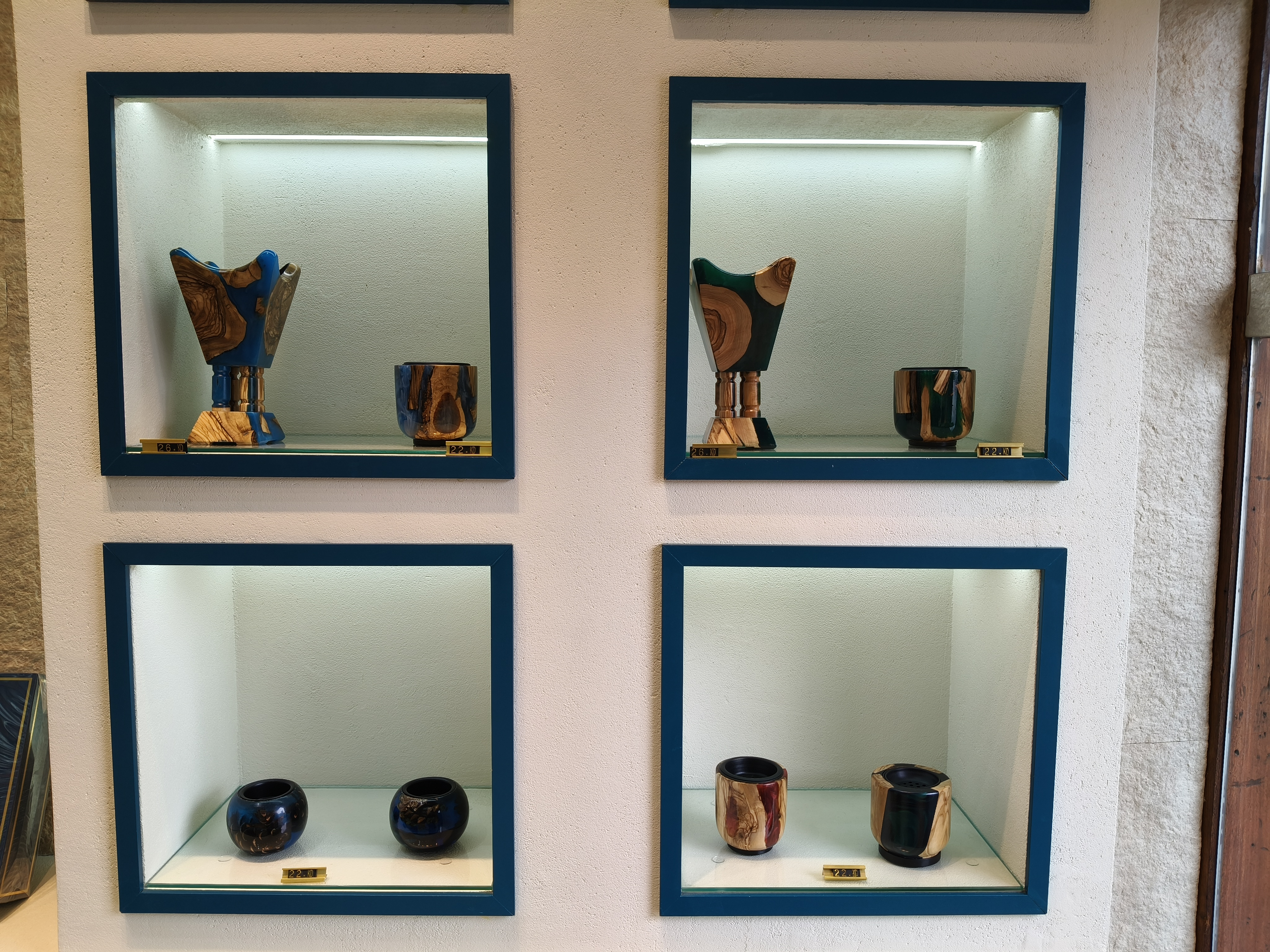
Another group of mabakhir on exhibition in a Kuwaiti museum.

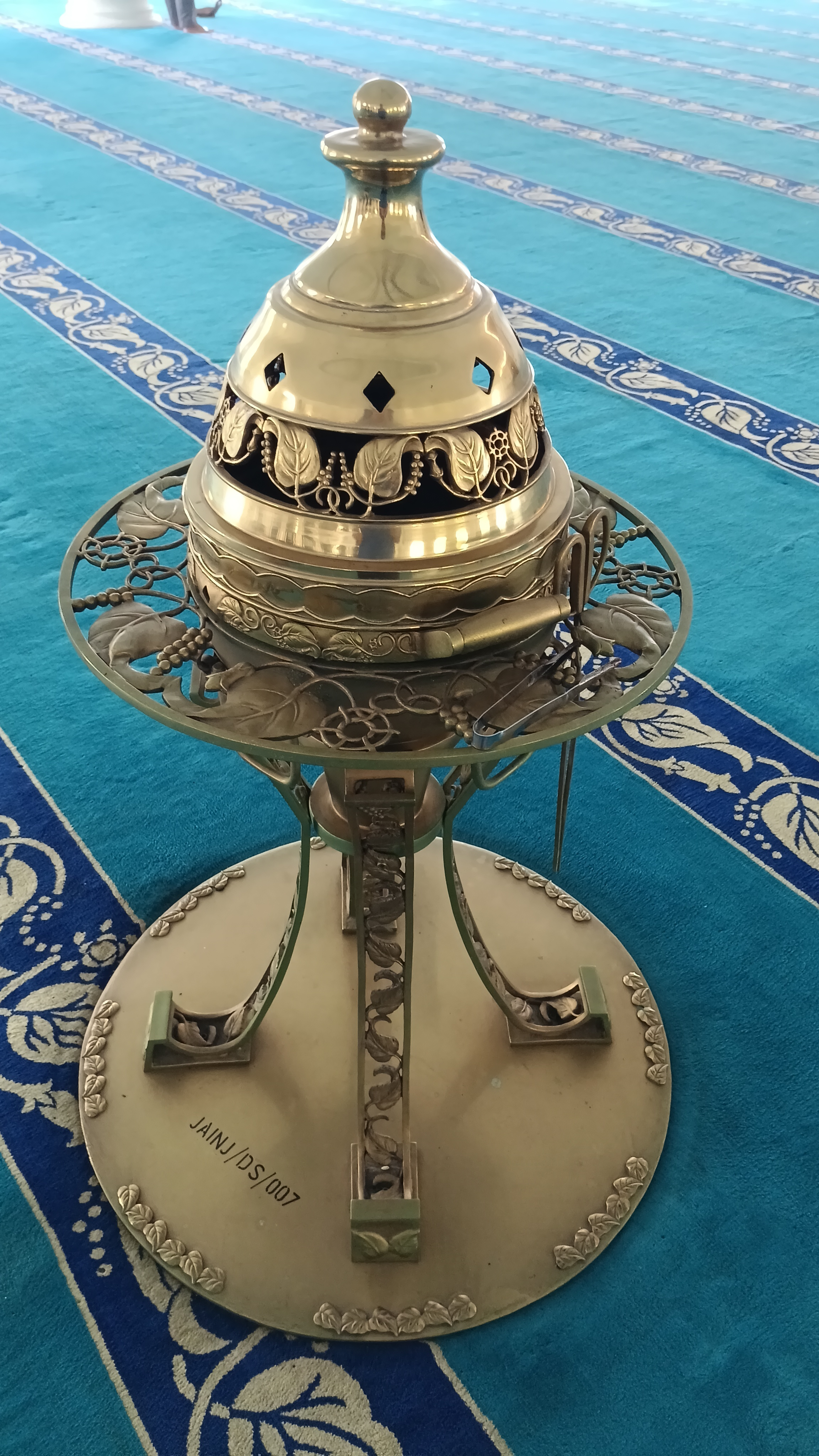
Mabkhara in the main prayer hall of a mosque in Telok Blangah.

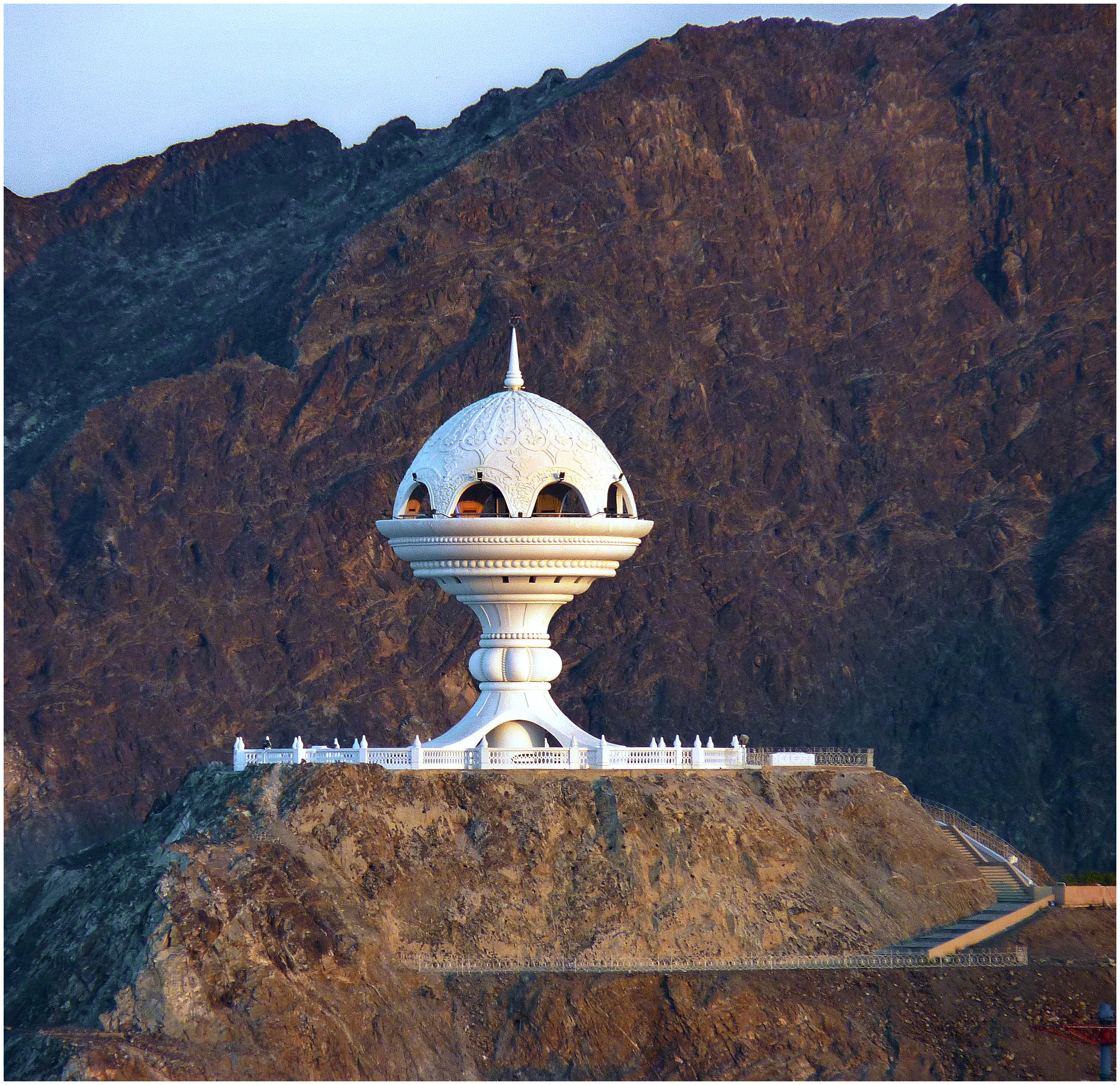
A giant monument in the shape of a mabkhara found in Muscat, Oman.

== See also ==
- Dabqaad
- Incense
