= Sheikh Ali al-Bakka Mosque =

Mosque in Hebron, West Bank, Palestine

- مسجد الشيخ علي بكاء
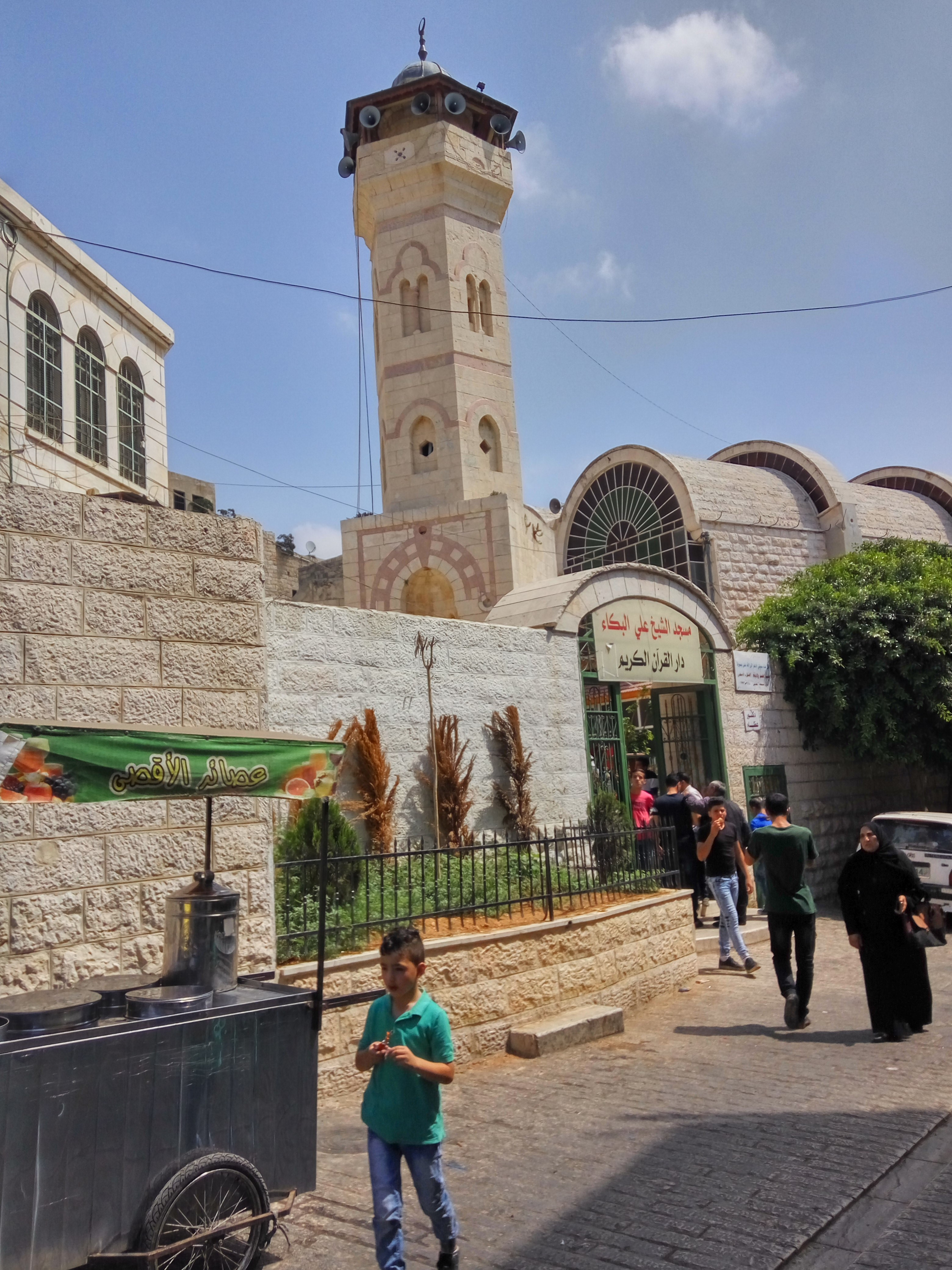
- The mosque in 2017

- Location of the mosque in the West Bank

Religion
- Affiliation: Sunni Islam
- Ecclesiastical or organizational status: Mosque
- Status: Active

Location
- Location: Hebron, West Bank
- Country: Palestine
- Interactive map of Sheikh Ali al-Bakka Mosque
- Coordinates: 31°31′42.3″N 35°06′13.5″E

Architecture
- Style: Mamluk
- Founder: Husam ad-Din Turuntay
- Completed: 1282
- Minaret: 1

The Sheikh Ali al-Bakka Mosque, also known as the Shaykh Ali al-Baka Mosque (Arabic: مسجد الشيخ علي بكاء), is a 13th-century mosque in the northwestern section of the Old City of Hebron in the southern West Bank, Palestine. It is situated in the Harat ash-Sheikh (or Sheik Ali al-Bakka) quarter, one of the Old City's quarters, which is named after the mosque.

== Overview ==
The mosque was founded by Husam ad-Din Turuntay in 1282 during the reign of Mamluk sultan al-Mansur Qalawun. Turuntay was the representative of the sultan in Jerusalem. The sanctuary is named after Sheikh Ali al-Bakka, a renowned Sufi religious leader from Iraq who lived in Hebron. The minaret was erected by the viceroy and practical strongman of the sultanate, Sayf al-Din Salar (d. 1310).

The original mosque was mostly demolished, however the minaret still stands and is viewed as an exemplary work of Mamluk architecture. Sitting on a rectangular base, its shaft has a hexagonal shape. The minaret base has an arched corridor which leads to the courtyard. In 1978 a new mosque was built on the site, but preserved the remains of the original mosque.

== See also ==
- List of mosques in Palestine
- Islam in Palestine
