= Battle of Elbistan =

1277 battle in southern Turkey

- Part of the Mongol invasions of the Levant
Date	April 15, 1277
Location	Elbistan (Abulustayn) 38.2014°N 37.1883°E
Result	Mamluk victory

Belligerents
Ilkhanate; Georgia; Sultanate of Rum	Mamluk Sultanate

Commanders and leaders
Tödä'ün Noyan †; Tuqu Noyan †; Uruqtu Noyan †; Pervâne; Demetrius II	Baybars; Isa ibn Muhanna; Zayn al-Din Ahmad bin Hanna

Strength
10,000-14,000; 7,000-10,000 Mongols; 3,000 Georgians; Unknown number of Rum Seljuk troops	10,000-14,000

Casualties and losses
6,000–10,000 Mongols, 2,000 or more Georgians and Rum Seljuks (Note: (Bar-Hebraeus states 5,000 Mongols and 2,000 Georgians while Ibn Shaddad states 6,770 Mongols) (Muffadal states the number of Rumi and Georgian dead almost equaled the number of the Mongols.))	Relatively few

On April 15, 1277, the Sultan of Egypt Baybars marched from Syria into the Mongol-dominated Seljuk Sultanate of Rûm and attacked the Mongol occupation force in the Battle of Elbistan (Abulustayn). While the Mongol forces initially gained the upper hand, the likely superior numbers of the Egyptian Mamluk forces decided the battle. The victory limited Mongol influence in Asia Minor and led to open hostilities between the Mamluk Sultanate of Egypt and the Mongol Ilkhanate.

== Background ==
After the initial Mongol invasion of Syria, which was beaten back by the Mamluks in 1260, both sides engaged in prolonged border skirmishes, though neither side was willing or able to undertake a major attack. The Egyptian Mamluks used the time to reform their forces and make political alliances with the Crusader States and the Golden Horde.

In 1277, Mamluk leader Baybars became concerned with the expansion of Mongol power into the Sultanate of Rum and launched an invasion into Asia Minor. Baybars and his forces crossed the Taurus Mountains via the Aqcha Darband pass, during which the Mamluk advance guard surprised a small force of Mongols. Some of the captured soldiers informed the Mamluks that the main army under Tödä'ün Noyan was encamped near the town of Elbistan.

Upon reaching Elbistan with at least 10,000 horseman, Baibars made ready for battle with the Mongols, expecting them to be around 30,000. The Mongol forces were smaller but they were supported by Georgians and Rum Seljuks that bolstered their numbers. The Mamluk army was led by Baybars and his Bedouin Arab general Isa ibn Muhanna and his Egyptian companionship vizier Zayn al-Din Ahmad bin Hanna.

== Battle ==
The battle begun with a charge of the Mongols and Georgians which smashed through the Egyptian Mamluk army's center and drove back their the left wing. At the start of the battle many of the Bedouin irregulars in the Egyptian Mamluk army were also killed. Their attack was concentrated on the left flank of the Mamluk army. This resulted in the Sultan's standard bearers (sanjaqiyya) being killed. The Mamluks however were able to regroup and launch a counter-attack. Baibars himself went with a few troops to deal with the Mongol right flank that was pounding his left flank. Baibars ordered a force from the army from Hama to reinforce his left. The large Mamluk numbers were able to overwhelm the Mongol force. The Mongols instead of retreating dismounted from their horses. Some Mongols were able to escape and took up positions on the hills. Once they became surrounded they once again dismounted, and fought to the death. During the battle, the Mongols destroyed the Mamluk left wing, consisting of many Bedouin irregulars, but were ultimately defeated.

It seems that both sides were expecting assistance from the army of the Pervâne and his Seljuks. The Pervâne had attempted to ally himself with both factions to keep his options open, but fled the battle with the Seljuk Sultan to Tokat. The Seljuk army was present near the battle, but did not take part. After the battle many Rumi soldiers were taken captive. Others joined the Mamluks willingly. Pervane's son Muhadhdhab al-Din was captured. In addition many Mongol officers and common soldiers were taken prisoner. Two of the soldiers captured, Qipchaq and Salar, would become mamluks of Qalawun and would become very important amirs. The Mongol officers' lives were spared as well.

== Aftermath ==
You attack our scouts and patrols without warning like bandits and kill some. When word reaches us and we mount to deal with you, you run away like thieves. If you intend to fight, come out into the field like men and stand firm. See my spear and test my reins. / If you are a mountain, I'll bring you down; if you are a stone, you won't remain where you are./ Where have you ever seen men of battle? You haven't even heard the cry of the fox.

— Abaqa Khan’s letter to Baybars

After Baybars was victorious, he marched unopposed to Kayseri (Qaysariyya) in the heart of Anatolia in triumph and entered the city on April 23, 1277; just over a week after the battle. There, he massacred the city's Christian population, but spared its Muslim inhabitants. The Muslim festival of Eid al-Adha happened around this time. In this festival, Baibars forbade the beating of drums of good tidings telling his emirs: "How can I rejoice? I had believed that if 10,000 horsemen of my army were to meet 30,000 Mongols, I would defeat them. But I met 7000 Mongols with all my army. The Mongols aroused panic and my army lost heart. The Mongols defeated the Muslim Left. Without Allah's grace, they would have defeated us. If I met them, and they were equal to the Muslims in size, or larger than they, then the matter would not have turned out well". Following the Eid al-Adha festival, Baibars left Rum and died in Syria soon after.

In light of Baibar's victory, Pervâne attempted to draw in the Mamluks into a confrontation with a fresh Mongol army led by Abaqa himself. However, Baibars was running low on supplies, and his equipment needed repair. The possibility of a new Mongol army convinced Baibars to return to Syria since he was so far away from his bases and supply line. As the Mamluk army returned to Syria the commander of the Mamluk vanguard, Izz al-Din Aybeg al-Shaykhi defected to the Mongols. Pervâne sent a letter to Baibars asking him to delay his departure. Baibars chastised him for not aiding him during the Battle of Elbistan. Baibars told him he was leaving for Siwas to mislead Pervâne and the Mongols to his true destination. Baibars also sent Taybars al-Waziri with a force to raid an Armenian town called al-Rummana, whose inhabitants had hidden the Mongols earlier.

The Mongol Ilkhan Abaqa, meanwhile reasserted his authority in Rum. After Abaqa surveyed the battlefield he became very angry. He ordered the Muslim population of Kayseri (Qaysariyya) and eastern Rum to be put to death. Large numbers of people were killed. Abaqa's army had to put down a rebellion of Karamanid Turkmen who declared their loyalty to Baibars. He sent an army of 30,000 towards Syria, but after learning the size of Baibars army from Aybeg al-Shaykhi he called his forces back. He wanted to send the army in the summer but his officers persuaded him to wait until the winter. However, the expedition was never sent. The Ilkhan Mongols were having logistical problems of their own, and many of the troops were called back to Ilkhanate lands. Abaqa entrusted the country to his other brother Qonghurtai and Shams al-Din Juwayni. At first Abaqa turned a blind eye to Pervâne. The Mongol nobles and noblewomen convinced him to have him put to death. Pervâne's flesh was eaten by Abaqa and the senior Mongols as an act of revenge, according to King Hethum II of Armenian Cilicia.

== Sources ==
- Al-Maqrizi, Al Selouk Leme'refatt Dewall al-Melouk, Dar al-kotob, 1997.
- Amitai-Preiss, Reuven (1995) Mongols and Mamluks: The Mamluk-Ilkhanid War, 1260–1281. Cambridge University Press, Cambridge. ISBN 978-0-521-46226-6
- Idem in English: Bohn, Henry G., The Road to Knowledge of the Return of Kings, Chronicles of the Crusades, AMS Press, 1969.
- Ibn Taghri, al-Nujum al-Zahirah Fi Milook Misr wa al-Qahirah, Dar al-Kotob, Beirut 1992.
- 'Izz al-Din Muhammad b. 'Ali Ibn Shaddad. Ta'rikh al-Malik al-Zahir.
- Mikaberidze, Alexander (2011). "Battle of Elbistan". In Mikaberidze, Alexander (ed.). Conflict and Conquest in the Islamic World: A Historical Encyclopedia. Vol. 1. ABC-CLIO.
- Amitai-Preiss, Reuven (1995). Mongols and Mamluks: The Mamluk-Ilkhanid War, 1260–1281. Cambridge University Press.
- Waterson, James (2007). The Knights of Islam: The Wars of the Mamluks. Greenhill Books. ISBN 978-1-85367-734-2.
