= Al-Shamah Mosque =

Mosque in Gaza, Palestine

Al-Sham'ah Mosque
- مسجد الشمعة
- Location of the mosque in Gaza

Religion
- Affiliation: Islam
- Ecclesiastical or organisational status: Mosque
- Status: Active

Location
- Location: Hayy al-Najjarin, al-Zaytun Quarter, Old City, Gaza, Gaza Strip
- Country: Palestine
- Interactive map of Al-Sham'ah Mosque
- Coordinates: 31°30′06″N 34°27′43″E

Architecture
- Architect: Sanjar al-Jawli
- Style: Mamluk
- Completed: 1315 CE

The Al-Sham'ah Mosque (Arabic: مسجد الشمعة, romanized: masjid aš-šamʿa), also known as the Bab ad-Darum Mosque, is a mosque located in Hayy al-Najjarin (the Carpenters' Neighborhood) of the al-Zaytun Quarter in the Old City of Gaza, Palestine. The mosque was built on 8 March 1315 by the Mamluk Governor of Gaza, Sanjar al-Jawli.

== Overview ==
Its name sham'ah translates as "Candle," although the origin of the name is unknown.

The inscription on the mosque which states its endowment by al-Jawli and the reigning Mamluk sultan at the time, al-Nasir Muhammad, originally belonged to a mosque al-Jawli built previously. That mosque was destroyed in 1799, during Napoleon's invasion of Gaza. Its stones were then used for other edifices in Gaza while its inscription was attached to the al-Sham'ah Mosque. Since its construction in the 14th-century, al-Sham'ah Mosque has gone through numerous repairs and restorations.

In 1355 it was visited by Ibn Batutah who made the following note: "Gaza had a beautiful Friday mosque (Great Mosque of Gaza), but these days Friday service is conducted in the mosque built by the amir al-Jawli. It is an elegant building, strongly constructed and its pulpit is from white marble." 15th-century Islamic scholar al-Sakhawi mentions that Khatib Yusuf al-Ghazzi was the imam of the mosque in 1440–41.

The mosque does not have a minaret.

== See also ==
- List of mosques in Palestine
- Islam in Palestine
