= Baybars II =

Mamluk sultan from 1309 to 1310

Sultan of Egypt
- Reign: April 1309 – 5 March 1310
- Predecessor: An-Nasir Muhammad
- Successor: An-Nasir Muhammad
- Born: unknown
- Died: 15 April 1310; Cairo, Egypt
- Religion: Sunni Islam

Baybars al-Jashankir (Arabic: بيبرس الجاشنكير; died 1310) or Baybars II, royal name al-Malik al-Muzaffar Rukn ad-Din Baybars aj-Jashankir al-Mansuri (الملك المظفر ركن الدين بيبرس الجاشنكير المنصورى), also known as Abu al-Fath (أبوالفتح), was the 12th Mamluk sultan of Egypt in 1309–1310.

== Background ==
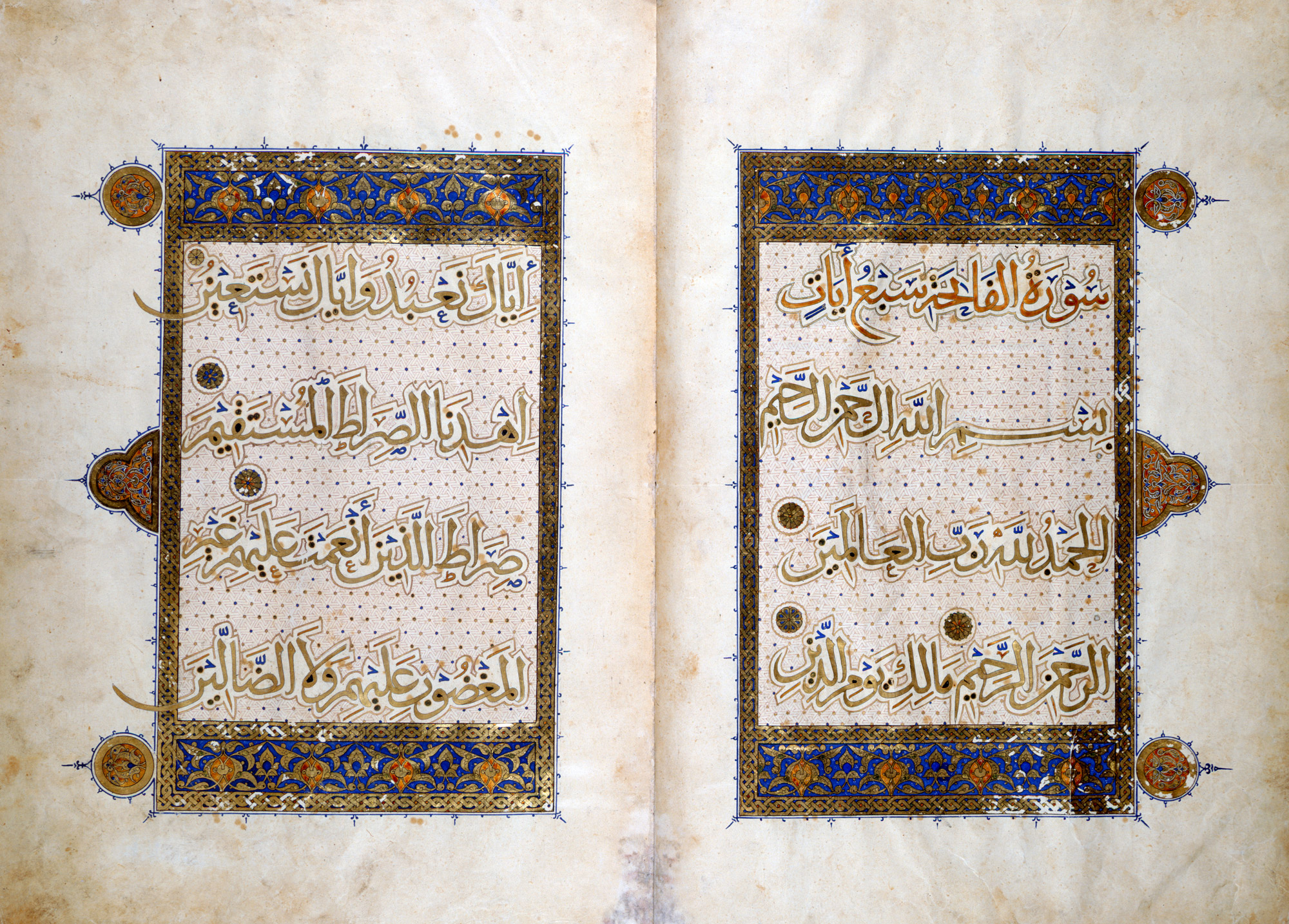
Double-page with the chapter Al-Fatiha from the Qur'an manuscript commissioned by Baybars in 1304. British Library

He was a Circassian Mamluk of Sultan Qalawun and served at the court of Qalawun's Sons Al-Ashraf Khalil and Al-Nasir Muhammad. He became an Emir (a prince) then a Jashnakir. During the second reign of Sultan Al-Nasir Mohammed from 1299 to 1309 he was the Vice-Sultan of Egypt. In 1302 he took part in suppressing a rebellion in upper Egypt and in 1303 he was a commander in the Egyptian army that defeated the Mongols led by Qutlugh-Shah at the Battle of Shaqhab.

In 1302, the Mamluk army of Sultan al-Nasir Muhammad crushed a Bedouin rebellion in Upper Egypt and "slew mercilessly every Bedouin in the land and carried off their women captive". G. W. Murray said that "This drastic solution of the Bedouin question removed the pure Arab descendants of the Conquerors from the scene and so enabled the Beja to preserve themselves as an African race practically uninfluenced by Arab blood, while leaving the desert edges of Upper Egypt free for settlement by the Western Bedouin." The army was led by the Oirat Mongol Mamluk Sayf al-Din Salar and Circassian Mamluk al-Baibars al-Jashnakir (Beibars).

== Etymology of the name ==
The monarch's name was a combination of Turkic, Persian and Arabic terms. The given name Baibars was a Turco-Mongolian name, meaning "Chosen by the chief/lord". The title of al-Malik al-Muzaffar was an Arabic honorific title that meant "the victorious king", and the title Rukn al-Din was an Arabic honorific title meaning the "pillar of faith". The second portion, "Jashangir", is Persian, meaning "Food connoisseur": the mamluk prince who tastes the Sultan's food to make sure it is not poisoned.

== Rise to power and fall ==
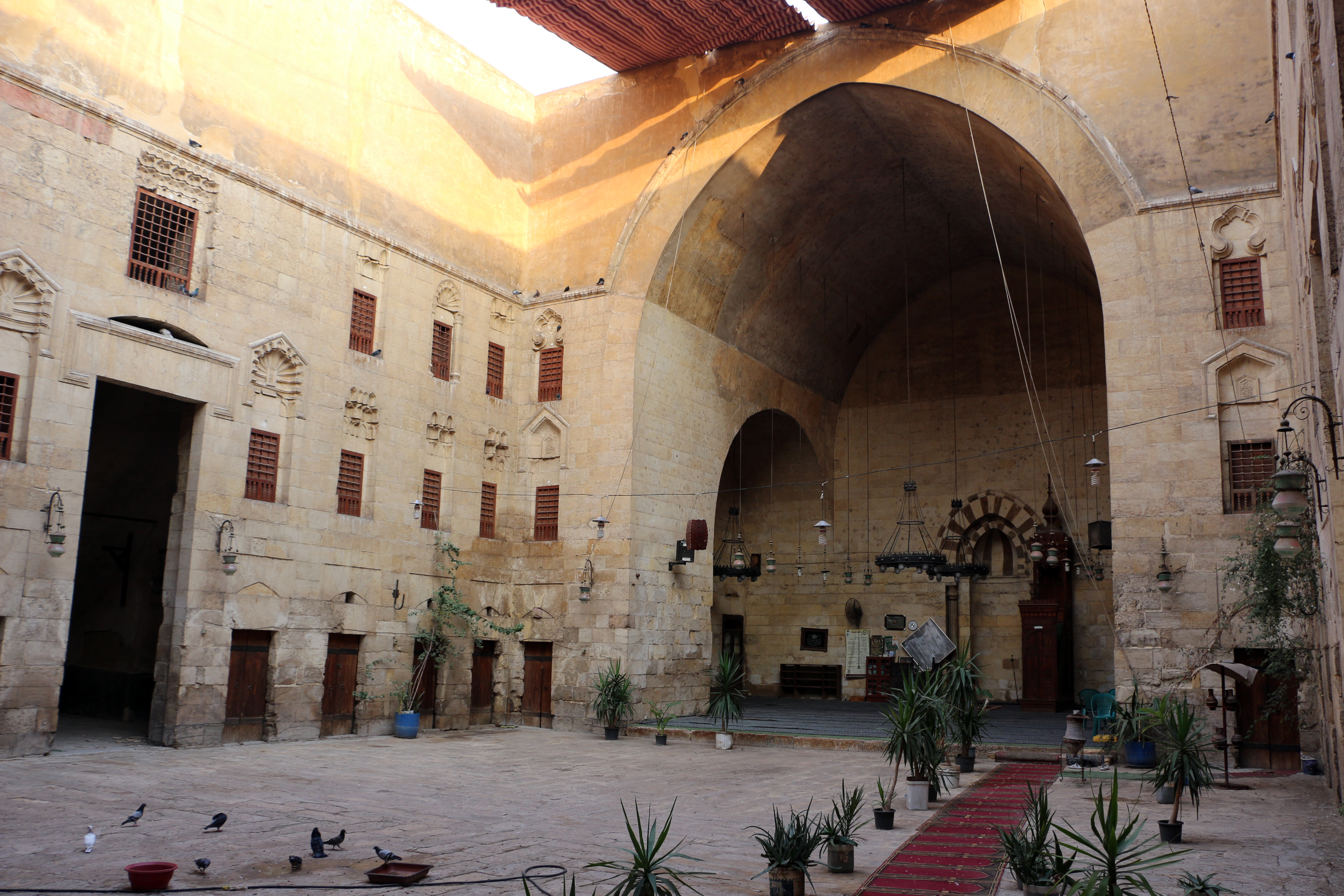
Khanqah Baybars al-Jashankir, Cairo

With Emir Sayf al-Din Salar he dominated the young Sultan Al-Nasir Muhammad who, feeling distressed, moved to Al Karak and resigned in 1309. Baibars al-Jashnakir became a Sultan after the position was imposed on him by Emir Sayf al-Din Salar and the Burji Mamluks.

The brief period of his reign (ten months and 24 days) was marked by economical and political unrest in addition to threats from Crusaders and Mongols. The Crusaders who had allied with the Mongol Empire continued to harass Mamluk outposts in the Levant. The poverty-stricken commons kept rampaging the streets of Cairo, calling him Rakin (useless) instead of Rukn (principal) demanding the return of Sultan al-Nasir Muhammad to Egypt. In 1310 Baibars al-Jashnakir stepped down and fled with his Mamluks from the angry mob. Sultan al-Nasir Muhammad returned to Egypt and Baibars al-Jashnakir was arrested and executed on his orders.

== Sources ==
- Al-Maqrizi, Al Selouk Leme'refatt Dewall al-Melouk, Dar al-kotob, 1997. In English: Bohn, Henry G., The Road to Knowledge of the Return of Kings, Chronicles of the Crusades, AMS Press, 1969.
- Ibn Taghri, al-Nujum al-Zahirah Fi Milook Misr wa al-Qahirah, al-Hay'ah al-Misreyah 1968
- Mahdi, Dr. Shafik, Mamalik Misr wa Alsham ( Mamluks of Egypt and the Levant), Aldar Alarabiya, Beirut 2008
- Sadawi. H, Al-Mamalik, Maruf Ikhwan, Alexandria.

Baybars II Bahri dynasty Cadet branch of the Mamluk Sultanate Born: ? Died: 1310
Regnal titles
| Preceded by An-Nasir Muhammad | Sultan of Egypt and Syria; April 1309 – 5 March 1310 | Succeeded by An-Nasir Muhammad |
