= Bahaa el-Din bin Hanna =

Vizier of the sultan of Egypt

Al-Shahib al-Wazir al-Kabir Bahaa el-Din bin Hanna
- بهاء الدين بن حنا

Vizier of the Ayyubid Sultanate
- In office March 1250 – July 1250
- Monarchs: Al-Muazzam Turanshah; Shajar al-Durr
- Preceded by: Unknown
- Succeeded by: position abolished

Vizier of Mamluk Sultanate
- In office July 1250 – July 1250
- Monarch: Aybak
- Preceded by: position established
- Succeeded by: Ibn bint al-A'azz
- In office February 1261 – April 1278
- Monarch: Baybars
- Preceded by: Zein el-Din Yacoub
- Succeeded by: Borhan el-Din bin Hasan

Personal details
- Died: April 1278 Cairo
- Parent: Mahammad bin Selim
- Creed: Sunni
- Religion: Islam

Ali bin Mahammad bin Sadid el-Din bin Muslim bin Hanna bin Bahaa el-Din Abu el-Hasan el-Masry (Arabic: علي بن محمد بن سديد الدين بن مسلم بن حنا بن بهاء الدين أبوالحسن المصري) (1205 – April 1278) or commonly known as Bahaa el-Din bin Hanna (بهاء الدين بن حنا), was the last vizier of the Ayyubid Sultanate in Egypt. He assumed the position during the reign of Sultan Turan Shah in March 1250 and then Sultana Shajar al-Durr. He then became the first vizier of the Mamluk Sultanate during the reign of Sultan Aybak. He was considered the most powerful and famous figure during the reign of Sultan Baybars and one of the most famous figures in the Mamluk era in general.

== Early life ==
Bahaa el-Din's grandfather, Hanna, was a Coptic Orthodox Christian man. Then he converted to Islam and called himself Selim, but the name Hanna remained with his family name. Bahaa el-Din's father was Judge Mahammad bin Selim, head of the army during the era of Sultan al-Kamil Mahammad al-Ayyubi, and his son Bahaa el-Din was born in 1205.

== Career ==
Bahaa el-Din bin Hanna began his work in the Diwan during the reign of Sultan Turan Shah then Sultana Shajar al-Durr until he rose through the ranks until he became Vizier of State. Then, after the execution of Shajar al-Durr, he was arrested because he was close to her, and then he was released and his conditions changed until Sultan Baybars took over the affairs of the Sultanate. When Baybars assumed power, Bahaa was restored to the position of vizier in February 1261 with the advice of Sheikh al-Islam al-Izz ibn Abd al-Salam, who said that he was one of the most righteous and decisive men of the state.

As time passed, Vizier Bahaa el-Din bin Hanna proved his competence and began to rise through the ranks until he became the rank of Al-Shahib al-Wazir al-Kabir (Grand Vizier), which was at the time the second most important position after the Sultan in the Mamluk Sultanate, which made him the man next to the Sultan in position.

Vizier Bahaa el-Din bin Hanna led major reform campaigns in the state. He was the one who did not accept bribery or mediocrity throughout his life. He fought bribery and corruption in the rest of the Mamluk Sultanate. This angered the corrupt people in the Sultanate, which made Ibn Hanna enemies everywhere. At the same time, he became the closest person to the Sultan of Egypt, Baybars, and the person he loved and was closest to the most. Baybars considered Vizier Bahaa el-Din bin Hanna a father to him, and no matter how much the corrupt princes told Baybars about dismissing Vizier Bahaa Al-Din, Baybars became angry with them. The historian Al-Nuwayri says:

"He was in the closest position to the Sultan and the most honorable in his position."

Vizier Bahaa el-Din bin Hanna was the builder of the famous El-Zahir Baybars Mosque in Cairo, so the Sultan did not entrust anyone other than him with the task of building the Great Mosque.

== Family ==
The Grand Vizier Bahaa el-Din bin Hanna founded a large and powerful Egyptian family, as his sons and grandchildren from the Hanna family continued to hold major positions in the Sultanate throughout the Mamluk era, and they often held vizier positions like their him and worked in the Diwan (royal offices).

== Death ==
The Grand Vizier Bahaa el-Din bin Hanna died at the age of 73 in April 1278 during the reign of Sultan As-Said Barakah, and a solemn military funeral was held for him in Cairo, befitting his position as the strong, loyal, and righteous man of the Sultanate.

== Legacy ==
The historian Ibn Shaker Al-Kutbi said about the Grand Vizier Bahaa el-Din ibn Hanna textually:

"He was one of the men of the time who was firm, determined, opinionated, shrewd, and wise. Al-Zahir Baybars sought guidance from him and delegated matters to him, and he did not have any control over him. He carried out the burdens of the kingdom. He was broad-minded, chaste, and upright. He would not accept anything from anyone unless he was among the righteous and the poor, and he used to say about them: He would be kind to them. He respects them and maintains good relations with them."

To this day, there is one of the largest streets in the capital, Cairo, bearing the name of the Grand Vizier Bahaa al-Din ibn Hanna. In addition to a mosque and endowment for him.
