= Sayf al-Din Salar =

Egyptian viceroy

Sayf al-Din Salar al-Mansuri

Governor of Egypt Na'ib al-Saltana (Viceroy of the Sultan Egypt)
- In office January 1299 – March 1310
- Monarchs: Al-Nasir Muhammad (r. 1299–1309); Baybars al-Jashnakir (r. 1309–1310)
- Succeeded by: Baktamur al-Jukandar

Ustadar (Majordomo)
- In office 1296 – January 1299
- Monarch: Lajin (r. 1296–1299)

Personal details
- Born: 1260s
- Died: September or October 1310 Cairo Citadel, Cairo, Egypt
- Resting place: Tomb of Salar and Sanjar al-Jawli, Cairo
- Spouse: Egyptian Aisha
- Children: Ali; Nasir; Abu Bakr; Unnamed daughter

Military service
- Allegiance: Mamluk Sultanate
- Years of service: 1277–1310
- Rank: Amir ashara (1288–1310); Amir mi'a (1310)
- Battles/wars: Battle of Wadi al-Khaznadar (1299) Fall of Ruad (1302) Battle of Marj al-Saffar (1303); Campaign against the Bedouin of Upper Egypt (1303)

Sayf al-Din Salar al-Mansuri (Arabic: سيف الدين سالار المنصوري, romanized: Sayf ad-Dīn Salār al-Manṣūrī, c. 1260s – September or October 1310) was the viceroy of the Mamluk sultan al-Nasir Muhammad during the latter's second reign (1299–1310). As a boy he was taken captive at the Battle of Elbistan in 1277 and became a mamluk (slave soldier) of the emir al-Salih Ali and eleven years later by the latter's father Sultan Qalawun. Salar distinguished himself in his training as a skilled horseman among other mamluks of the Mansuriyya faction (mamluks of Qalawun). He was promoted to the rank of ustadar (majordomo) by his friend, Sultan Lajin in 1299. After participating in Lajin's assassination later that year he effectively became the strongman of the sultanate alongside Baybars al-Jashankir. Despite tensions and incidents between their respective factions, Salar and Baybars avoided direct conflict throughout their power-sharing arrangement. Salar continued as viceroy when Baybars acceded as sultan in 1309 after al-Nasir Muhammad stepped down and exiled himself. After Baybars was deposed in 1310, al-Nasir Muhammad returned to power and Salar was consequently imprisoned and starved to death. His sons and grandsons became middle-ranking emirs of al-Nasir Muhammad and his successors.

== Early life ==
Salar was an ethnic Oirat Mongol. He was taken captive, likely between the ages of ten and fifteen, during the Battle of Elbistan in Anatolia, where the Mamluks routed the Mongol Ilkhanate in 1277. His father had been a senior Ilkhanid emir in Anatolia. He thereafter became a mamluk (slave soldier) of al-Salih Ali, the son Sultan Qalawun. Following al-Salih Ali's death in 1288, Salar was transferred to the ownership of Qalawun. From the time of his ownership by al-Salih Ali and through Qalawun's sultanate, he likely lived and trained with the Sultan's elite mamluk corps, the Mansuriyya. He was a skilled horseman and had achieved the rank of amir ashara (commander of ten mamluks) in the same year he was transferred to Qalawun.

== Viceroy ==
During the reign of Lajin (r. 1296–1299), with whom Salar had a close friendship, Salar first attained prominence as the Sultan's ustadar (majordomo). Nonetheless, Salar participated in Lajin's assassination and the subsequent installation of Qalawun's young son al-Nasir Muhammad as sultan in 1299. Later, in September of that year, Salar also helped suppress a mutiny by an Oirat contingent in the Mamluk army in Palestine whose aim has been to reinstall the Oirat Kitbugha as sultan. The Oirats had collaborated with disaffected members of the Royal Mamluks and attempted to assassinate Salar at Tell al-Ajjul near Gaza.

During the second reign of al-Nasir, eight mamluks of the Mansuriyya, including Salar, wielded actual power. He held the official role of na'ib al-saltana (viceroy) and was one of the two most powerful leaders of the sultanate alongside Baybars al-Jashnakir. Salar and Baybars arranged for a relatively small payment to the Sultan while they divided most state matters between themselves. According to the 14th-century historian al-Maqrizi, Salar and Baybars would assemble the leading mamluks and officials in front of the Sultan twice weekly where "Salar presented to him whatever he wanted, consulted about it with the amirs and said: 'the sultan ordered so and so' and he [al-Nasir Muhammad] signed it".

Salar and Baybars largely avoided conflict with each other, aware of the potentially fatal repercussions for either should factional strife occur. The Sultan often attempted to foster such strife between them and their respective supporters. Salar's 'Turkish' faction was composed of most of the Mansuriyya and the remnants of the older Salihiyya mamluks, while Baybars was backed by the largely Circassian Burjiyya mamluks, the more numerous and stronger faction within the Mansuriyya.

Salar had established marital ties with the family of Qalawun in 1299 when he married off his daughter to Musa ibn al-Salih Ali ibn Qalawun. In 1304 they consummated the marriage and in the following year, Salar brought his mother and two brothers, Juba and Dawud, to Egypt, along with around 200 other Oirats. Salar's other brothers Adam, Mughultay, Lajin and Samuk, were already established in Egypt. Salar soon after promoted his relatives and associates, awarding emirates to his brothers, his son-in-law Musa, and his friend Sanjar al-Jawli.

=== Campaign against Bedouin of Upper Egypt ===
In 1303 Salar and Baybars led a large scale military campaign against the Bedouin tribes of Upper Egypt for their persistent defiance of Mamluk authority. The Bedouin had long evaded taxes, taxed the merchants of Asyut and Manfalut, and ignored the orders of the local governors. The Bedouin were taken by surprise and numerous tribesmen were slain or taken captive. Despite the heavy toll inflicted, the tribal revolts remained a persistent problem throughout Mamluk rule.

=== Confrontation with the sultan ===
In late 1307 or early 1308, al-Nasir Muhammad and his Royal Mamluks attempted to assassinate Salar and Baybars in their homes. The emirs' gained knowledge of the plot and secured the secret defection of the sultan's leading hitman, the emir Baktamur. Salar then sent his brother Samuk to besiege the sultan and his mamluks, eventually compelling al-Nasir Muhammad to reach an agreement with Salar. The sultan remained in Cairo but with heavy restrictions on his movements and budget. As a result, he escaped to the desert fortress of al-Karak in Transjordan in 1309 where he renounced his sultanate.

In the consultations among the senior emirs to elect a new sultan, Salar was initially the leading candidate, having served as viceroy for the preceding decade and having the support of the older Mansuri emirs. Nonetheless, the stronger Burjiyya faction favored Baybars for the sultanate, and Salar lent his backing. In the ensuing reign of Baybars, Salar remained viceroy.

== Downfall ==
Al-Nasir Muhammad regained power in March 1310 and soon after moved against his opponents among the Mansuriyya, including Salar. The latter had publicly expressed his full support for the Sultan following the exile of Baybars al-Jashnakir. At the time, Salar was in command of the Cairo Citadel. When the Sultan arrived in Cairo, Salar offered him numerous horses, slaves and precious fabrics to appease him. As Salar felt vulnerable in Cairo, capital of the Sutlanate, he requested and received from al-Nasir Muhammad a reassignment to the Shawbak fortress in the desert of Transjordan. The Sultan also promoted him to the rank of emir of one hundred mamluk cavalries.

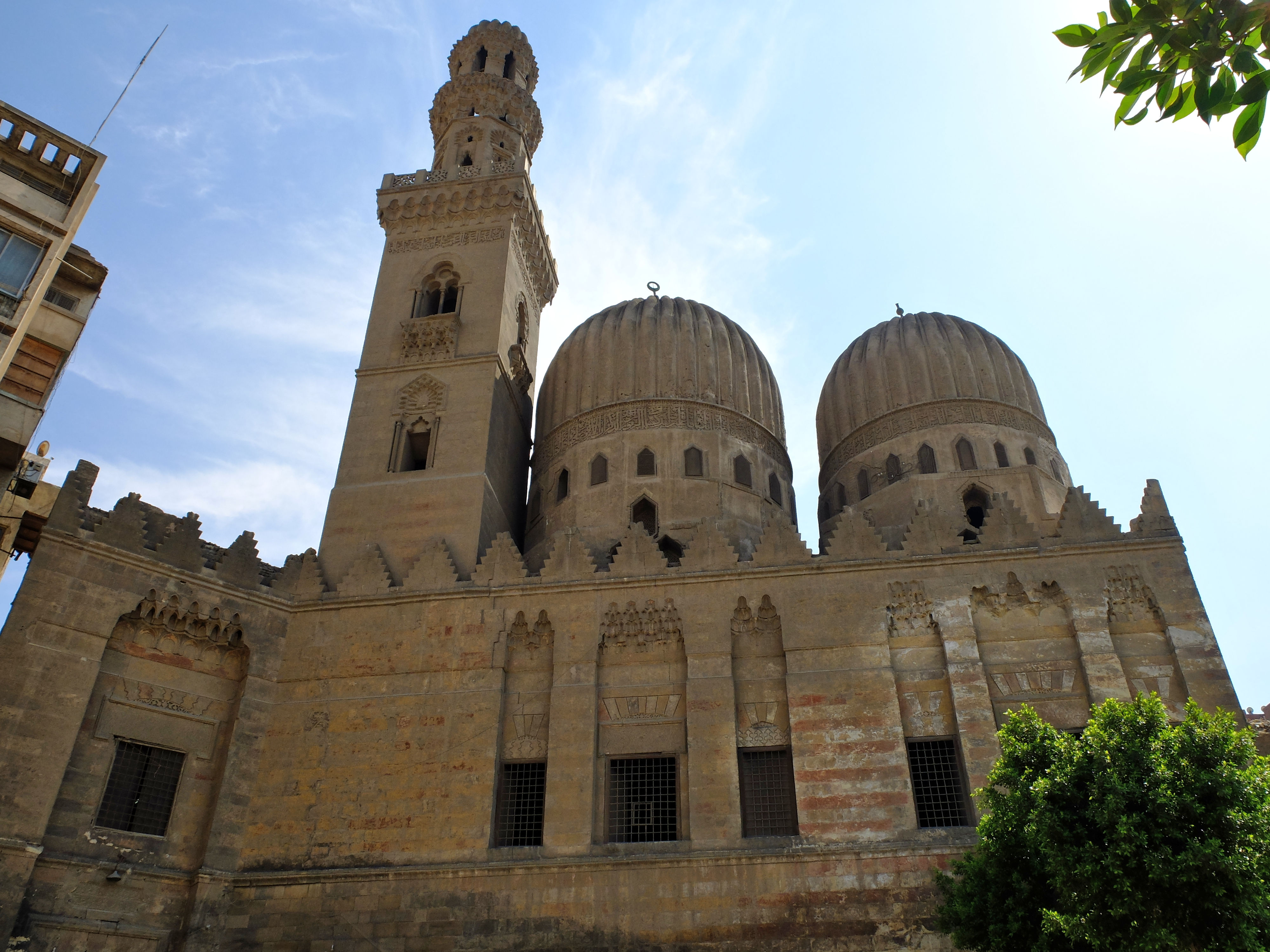
The Khanqah-Madrasa in Cairo where Salar is buried. It was built in his honor by his friend, the emir Sanjar al-Jawli

After al-Nasir Muhammad executed Baybars al-Jashnakir in April, he arrested twenty of Salar's close associates, including three of his brothers Samuk, Juba and Dawud. Salar refused summons to Cairo, but agreed after being persuaded by his friend Sanjar al-Jawli. The roads to the Ilkhanate were concurrently blocked for prevent a potential escape by Salar. Upon arriving in Cairo, Salar was imprisoned in the city's citadel where he died of starvation in September or October 1310. Afterward, his numerous properties and money were confiscated by the Sultan. His brothers Juba and Dawud were released from prison in 1315.

Sanjar al-Jawli built a double mausoleum tomb for Salar and himself in Cairo. Salar's mausoleum was the larger of the two. The complex also served as a khanqah (Sufi lodge) and madrasa.

== Descendants ==
Salar's son Ali was appointed an amir ashara by al-Nasir Muhammad and was promoted to amir tablkhanah (commander of forty mamluks). He was recorded as in emir in Egypt in 1338 and died four years later. His position was inherited by his son Khalil (d. 1368), who was also the supervisor of Salar's awqaf (religious endowments). Salar's son Nasir was already an emir of ten by the start of al-Nasir Muhammad's reign. Another son of Salar, Sayf al-Din Abu Bakr, was an emir and his son Musa (d. 1395) was an emir of ten and held the position of amir tabar (head of the ax-bearers).

== Architectural legacy ==
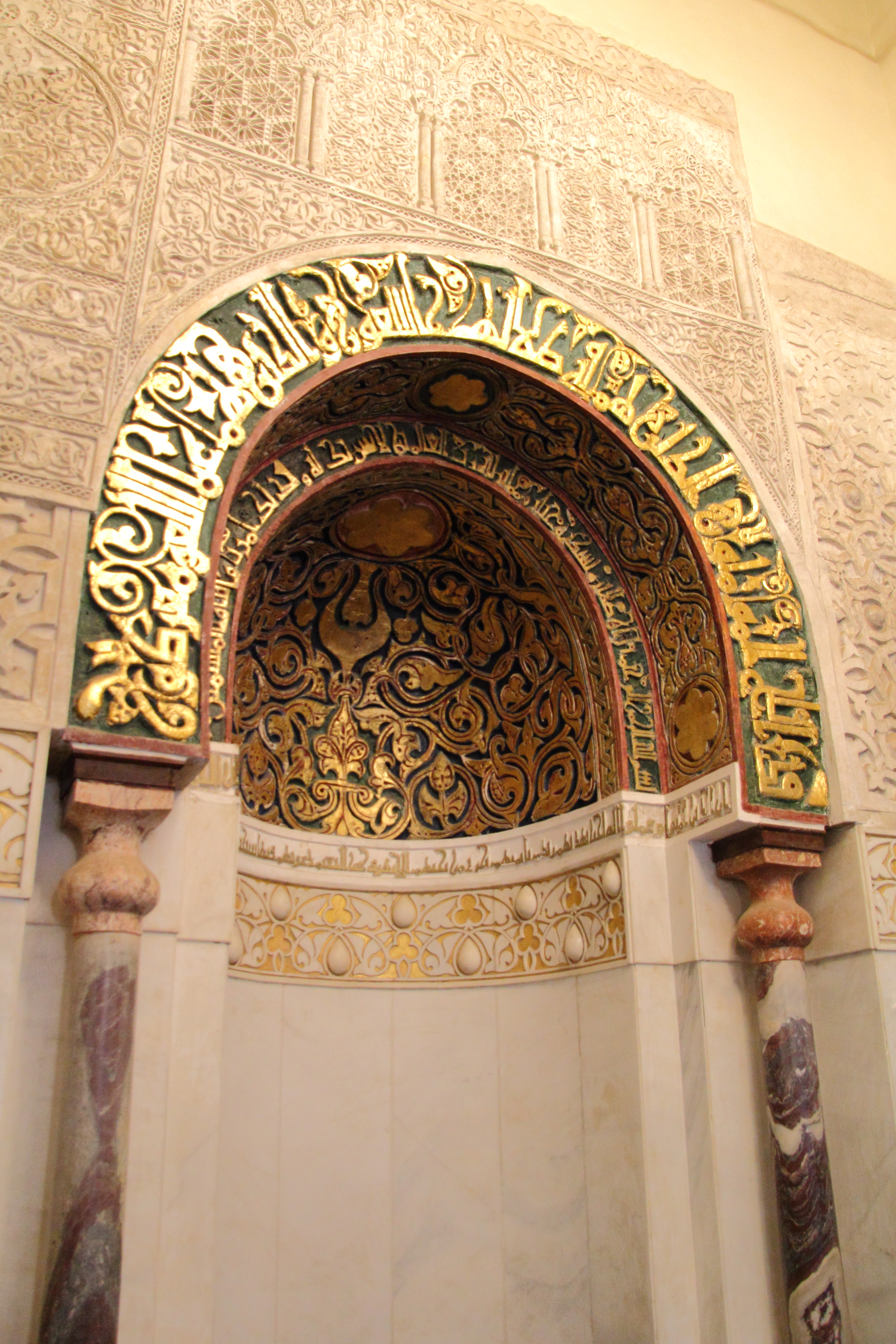
The mihrab (prayer niche) of the al-Azhar Mosque was restored by Salar after a 1303 earthquake

Salar restored the mihrab (prayer niche) of the al-Azhar Mosque in Cairo and changed the decoration of its spandrels following damage from an earthquake in 1303. In the Fustat district he built a mihrab on the outside of the Mosque of Amr ibn al-As, the oldest mosque in Egypt. The mihrab is no longer extant, but could be seen in older photographs of the mosque. Both mihrabs were designed with multiple rows of niches inlaid with geometric patterns and arabesques.

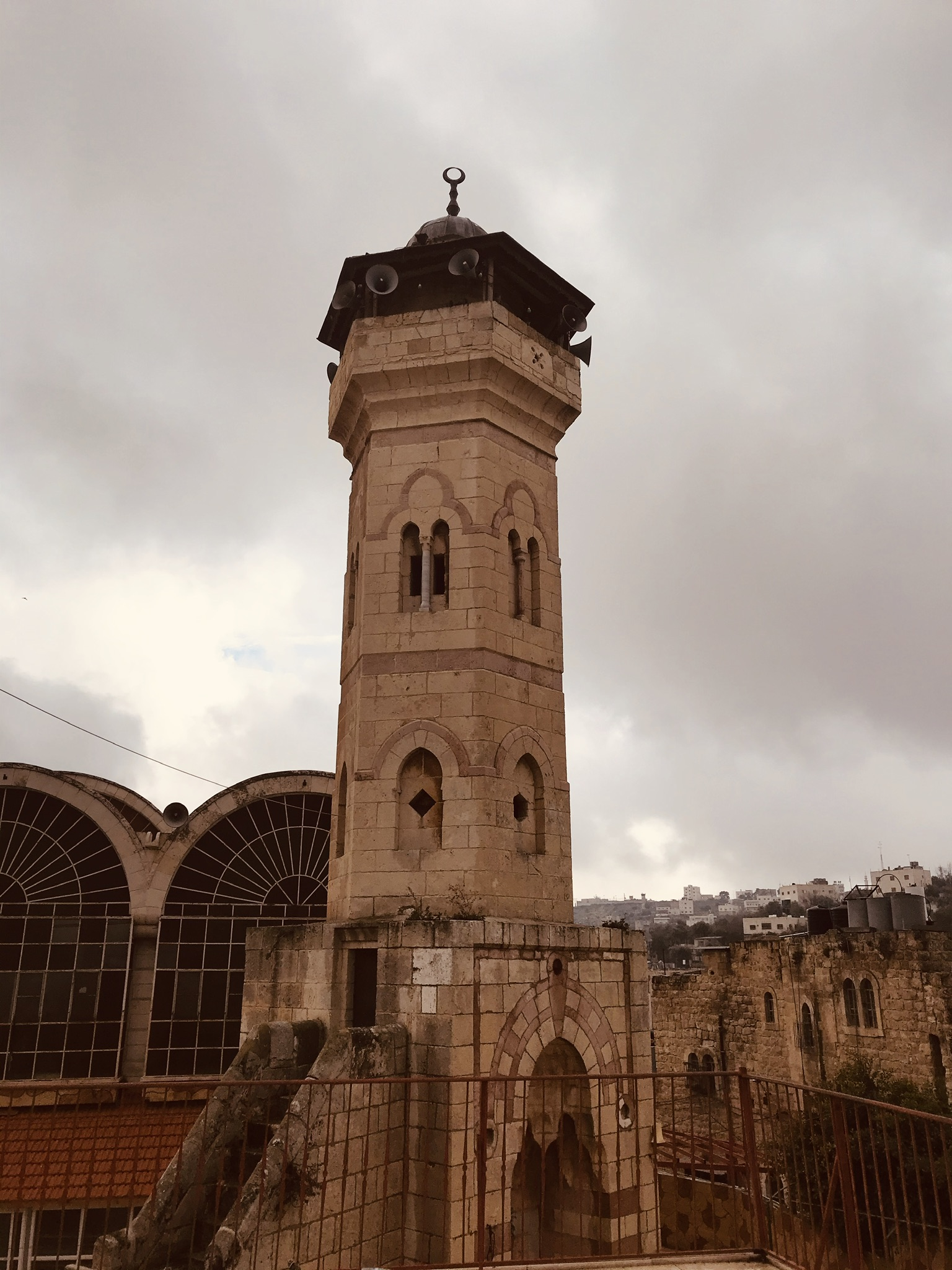
The minaret of the Sheikh Ali al-Bakka Mosque in Hebron was built by Salar

In Palestine Salar built the Great Mosque of Majdal Asqalan (in modern Ashkelon) and the minaret of the Sheikh Ali al-Bakka Mosque in Hebron. He is credited by an inscription for building the khan (caravanserai) near Beisan called Khan al-Hamra or Khan al-Ahmar (both mean "the Red Khan"). The Mamluk historian al-Maqrizi wrote that the khan was built by Sanjar al-Jawli for Salar.

== Bibliography ==
- Amitai, R. (2008). "Mamluks of Mongol Origin and Their Role in Early Mamluk Political Life". Mamluk Studies Review. 12 (1): 119–137.
- Behrens-Abouseif, Doris (1992). Islamic Architecture in Cairo: An Introduction. Leiden, New York and Koln: Brill. ISBN 90-04-09626-4.
- Mazor, Amir (2015). The Rise and Fall of a Muslim Regiment: The Manṣūriyya in the First Mamluk Sultanate, 678/1279–741/1341. Gottingen: Bonn University Press. ISBN 978-3-8471-0424-7.
- Mazor, Amir (2014). "The "Manṣūrīyah Legacy": The Manṣūrī Amirs, Their Mamluks, and Their Descendants during al- Nāṣir Muḥammad's Third Reign and After". Mamluk Studies Review. 18.
- Sharon, M. (1999). Corpus Inscriptionum Arabicarum Palaestinae, Volume Two: -B-C. Leiden: Brill. ISBN 90-04-11083-6.
- Yosef, Kobe (2012). "Mamluks and Their Relatives in the Period of the Mamluk Sultanate (1260-1517)". Mamluk Studies Review. 16: 55–69.
