= Abad =

Abad may refer to:

== Places ==
- -abad, a suffix used in place names in Iran, Pakistan, Afghanistan, and India
- Abad, Azerbaijan, a village
- Abad, Bushehr, Iran
- Abad, Hormozgan, Iran
- Abad-e Eram Posht, Isfahan Province, Iran
- Abad-e Soleyman, Isfahan Province, Iran
- Abad, Kerman, Iran
- Abad, Khuzestan, Iran
- Abad, Kandiaro Taluka, Sindh, Pakistan

== People ==
- Abad (surname)

== See also ==
- ABAD (disambiguation)
- Abadi (disambiguation)
- Abida (disambiguation)
