= Abadi (surname) =

Abadi (Persian: آبادی, Arabic: آبادي, Persian: عبادی, Urdu: آبادی, Malay: عبادي) is a surname. Notable people with the surname include:

- Abby Abadi (born 1977), Malaysian actress
- Ebrahim Abadi (1934–2019), Iranian stage and cinema actor
- Fritzie Abadi (1915–2001), Syrian American painter
- Haider Al-Abadi (born 1952), Iraqi politician
- Martín Abadi (born 1963), Argentinian computer scientist
- Mohammad Abadi (born 1990), Syrian footballer
- Moussa Abadi (1910–1997), member of the French Resistance during World War II
- Nomi Abadi, American composer
- Odette Abadi (1914–1999), French physician, co-founder of Réseau Marcel
- Rukaia Al-abadi (born 1988), Syrian journalist
- Shakir Shuja Abadi (born 1954), Pakistani poet
- Yitzchak Abadi (1933–2025), American Orthodox Jewish Rabbi and Posek

== See also ==
- Soudabeh Abadi (Alchemist), a mutant character in Marvel Comics
- Abbadi (disambiguation)
- Badi (disambiguation)
- Ebadi (disambiguation)
