= Abbadi =

Abbadi (ʿAbbādī) may refer to:

== Surname ==
- Abū ʿĀṣim al-ʿAbbādī (died 1066)
- Marouf al-Bakhit (born 1947), Prime Minister of Jordan of the Abbadi tribe
- Hani Abbadi (died 2014), Jordanian politician
- Ziad Manaseer Al Abbadi, Jordanian-Russian entrepreneur and billionaire
- Haider al-Abadi (born 1952) Prime Minister of Iraq
- Shirin Ebadi (born 1947) Nobel Peace Prize winner
- Ilyas Abbadi (born 1992), Algerian boxer
- Mohammad Khtoom Al-Abadi (born 1950), Jordanian actor
- Mostafa El-Abbadi (1928–2017), Egyptian historian
- Amr El Abbadi (born 1958), Egyptian computer scientist

== Other uses ==
- Abbadid dynasty, medieval rulers of Seville
- Abbadi (Bedouin), tribes in Jordan
- A member of the Ababda people of Egypt and Sudan

== See also ==
- Abadi (surname)
