= Ashrafi (disambiguation) =

Ashrafi may refer to:

== Currency ==
- Ashrafi, a historical gold coin issued by various Muslim dynasties
- Double mohur, called an ashrafi, a defunct high-value gold coin in several Asian countries

== People ==
- Ali Hussain Ashrafi (1850-1936), Indian Sufi saint
- Ali Reza Ashrafi (1964-2023), Iranian mathematician
- Ata'ollah Ashrafi Esfahani (1902-1982), Iranian religious leader
- Mehdi Attar-Ashrafi (1948-2021), Iranian middleweight weightlifter and Olympian
- Muhammad Ashrafi (1804-1898), Iranian Shia Marja
- Mukhtar Ashrafi (1912-1975), Soviet composer
- Muqadamma Ashrafi (1936-2013), Tajik medievalist
- Romina Ashrafi (2006-2020), 14-year-old Iranian girl murdered in 2020
- Syeda Asifa Ashrafi Papia (born 1967), Bangladeshi politician
- Tahir Mehmood Ashrafi, Pakistani cleric
- Taynal al-Ashrafi (died 1343), Mamluk emir and mamluk
- Talayeh Ashrafi, birth name of Iranian-American actress Tala Ashe (born 1984)
- Wahab Ashrafi (1936-2012), Indian literary critic

== Places ==
- Abbasabad-e Ashrafi, village in Khuzestan province, Iran
- Ashrafi Esfahani Expressway, expressway in Tehran, Iran
- Ashrafi field, an oil and gas field in Azerbaijan
- Shahid Ashrafi Esfahani Airport, Iranian airport

== Religion ==
- Ashrafi Sufi order, a tariqa (order) of Islam named for Ashraf Jahangir Semnani and a sub-branch of the Chishti Order

== See also ==
- Ashraf (disambiguation)
- Al-Ashraf (disambiguation)
- Ashrafiya (disambiguation)
- Ashrafiyya (disambiguation)
