= Banu Saqr =

- Bedouin
- Location: Beisan Valley of northern Palestine (c. 1700–1948); Northern Jordan (1948–present)
- Descended from: Mafarijah of Banu Lam of Tayy
- Branches: Zamil; Wadi; Muflih; Irsan; Zubayd; Sulaybi; Rabah
- Religion: Islam

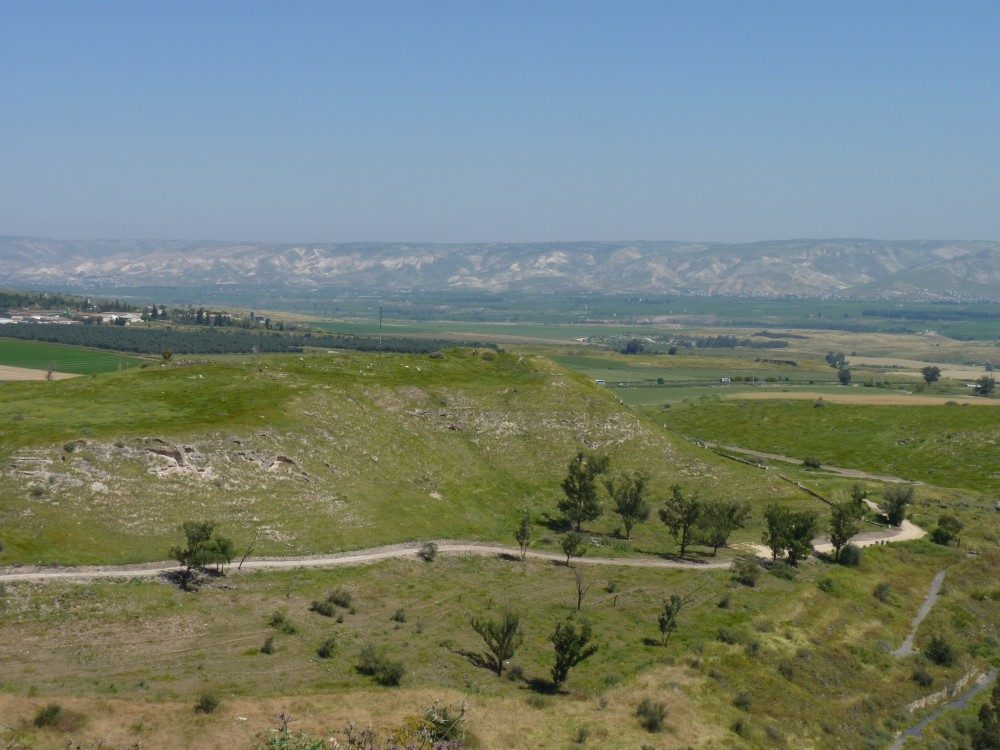
The Beisan Valley, 2010

The Banu Saqr or Al Sqour (alternatively transliterated Sakr, Saqir or Sagr) is a Bedouin tribe formerly concentrated in the Beisan Valley of Palestine from c. 1700 until the 1948 Palestine war and now resident in modern Jordan. Throughout the 18th century, they were the strongest of the Bedouin tribes of northern Palestine and were in frequent conflict with the strongmen of the region, first the tax farmer Daher al-Umar (1730–1775) and then the governor Ahmad Pasha al-Jazzar (1775–1804). Their conflict stemmed from these leaders' efforts to stem the tribe's raiding of the region's villages and roads.

The Saqr remained a potent tribe throughout the 19th century and were reported by western travelers during this period to have dominated the Beisan Valley. From the 1880s through the early 20th century, they were semi-nomadic cultivators, shepherds and cattle-raisers who seasonally migrated through the Jordan Valley to graze their livestock. They acquired deeds to the lands of the Beisan Valley they had long inhabited in the 1920s, but much of these lands were sold to Arab middlemen and eventually to the Jewish National Fund, which evicted the Saqr from those lands. By the late 1940s, the sheikhs of the Saqr and Palestinian nationalist politicians warned of the impending "extinction" of the tribe as a result of their displacement. In the days leading up to the 1948 Palestine War, the Saqr resisted the occupation of their tribal areas by Jewish forces but were defeated and expelled or fled to the Emirate of Transjordan.

The tribe claimed common ancestry with the Sardiyya, a Bedouin tribe established in the Hauran from at least the 16th century. By the 20th century, Saqr consisted of several subtribes and clans from different lineages, regions and lifestyles, though their paramount sheikhs claimed descent from the tribe's original ancestor. The tribe had its own set of customs and traditions regarding social status, marriage, circumcision, justice, mediation and honoring of saints. They remained politically affiliated with their traditional tribal allies in Palestine, the Hauran and Transjordan.

== History ==
=== Ottoman period ===
==== Origins and establishment in Palestine ====
According to their oral traditions, the Banu Saqr established themselves in the Beisan valley of Palestine in c. 1700. The tradition holds they were a branch of the Mafarija tribe whose abodes were in the Hauran and Balqa and their migration to Palestine was precipitated by the invasions of their home areas by the Anizzah Bedouins from Najd. As recorded by ethnographer Tawfiq Canaan in his 1936 publication about the Saqr, the tribe's leading families traced their descent to an ancestor named Mallak; Mallak's brother Fawwaz was the ancestor of the leading family of the Sardiyya, a branch of the Mafarija. While the descendants of Fawwaz migrated to the Hauran, the descendants of Mallak partly settled in the Balqa where they formed part of the Abbad tribe and others eventually settled in the Beisan Valley as the Saqr. A similar tradition places the 16th-century abode of the Mafarija (or Banu Mufarrij) in the Nablus highlands and that a conflict at that time split off the Saqr under Umar ibn Jabal from other Mafarija faction, the Sardiyya under its leader Rashid.

As Bedouins, the Saqr roamed the region between Safed in the north to Nablus in the south. According to historian Thomas Philipp, "They had a bad—but probably well-deserved—reputation as an unruly, dangerous element, making highways insecure, endangering commercial traffic, looting and plundering, and not paying taxes." According to historian Moshe Sharon, during this century, the "Banu Saqr was the strong tribe of northern Palestine".

==== Activity under Daher al-Umar ====
As early as 1707, they forged ties with the Zayadina (sing. Zaydani), a formerly Bedouin family whose members served as tax farmers of the Galilee's districts from the late 17th century, by facilitating their settlement in the village of Arraba, where leaders of the Saqr lived. After the Ottoman governor of Sidon Eyalet and the rural clans of Jabal Nablus jointly assaulted the Saqr to rein in the tribe, the Saqr under their leader Rashid al-Jabr, chose the upstart Zaydani sheikh Daher al-Umar to intercede on their behalf with the authorities. Daher, in turn, drew on the strength of the Saqr and with their support, occupied the town of Tiberias in 1730, expelling its mutasallim (governor) and gaining its tax farm.

The Saqr's alliance with Daher faltered by the mid-1730s. Daher increasingly relied on a professional troop of Maghrebi mercenaries rather than the Saqr, who were harder to control, more interested in plunder than combat, and only available for short stints. Furthermore, the Saqr's raids on the Galilee's villages and highway robberies directly contravened Daher's key policy of establishing law and order in his growing domains and became a liability for him. Daher limited the Saqr's ability to launch looting raids and curtailed their activies. Under Rashid al-Jabr, the Saqr defected to the clans of Jabal Nablus led by the Madi and Jarrar families in their struggle with Daher over control of Nazareth and the fertile Marj Ibn Amer plain, which separated Jabal Nablus from the Galilee. The Zayadina with their Maghrebi soldiers and the Nazarenes routed the Saqr–Jarrar coalition, but withdrew from Jabal Nablus after failing to subdue the Jarrars at their Sanur fortress.

The Saqr continued to act against Daher in the following years, including supporting his elder brother Sa'd al-Umar's bid to gain the paramount mashaykha (chieftainship) of the Zayadina. They backed efforts by the governor of Damascus, Sulayman Pasha al-Azm, to eliminate Daher in 1737–1738 and 1742–1743. In the clashes between Daher and Sulayman Pasha in 1737, the Saqr captured Daher's brother Salih and handed him over to Sulayman Pasha, who had him executed in Damascus. This furthered the hostility between Daher and the tribe. During the sieges of Tiberias (1742–1743) by Sulayman Pasha, the Saqr again formed part of the governor's coalition against Daher, along with the Beni Sakhr tribe. In 1771, when Daher and the forces of Ali Bey al-Kabir of Egypt launched their widescale assault against Damascus Eyalet, the Saqr backed the governor of Damascus, Uthman Pasha al-Kurji.

Despite the frequent hostility between the Saqr and Daher and the latter's limits on the tribe's activities, he continued to allow them to dwell in the Marj Ibn Amer and Beisan valleys and graze their livestock there. According to historian Amnon Cohen, provided the Saqr and other Bedouins did not disturb traffic and commerce along the trade routes, Daher "was prepared to adopt a reasonably tolerant attitude towards the nomadic tribes".

==== Activity under Ahmad Pasha al-Jazzar ====
Daher's practical successor as regional strongman, the Acre-based governor of Sidon Ahmad Pasha al-Jazzar, maintained and strengthened fortifications in the Tiberias area to keep the Bedouin, including the Saqr, in check. Nevertheless, these measures were mostly effective in preventing the entry of Bedouin tribes from outside of Palestine and less effective against the Saqr, who were already present in Palestine. They continued to threaten the settled population, prompting Jazzar's warning to their lead sheikh at the time, Zamil, and his son Faris. The Saqr shifted their raiding activities from Sidon Eyalet to Nablus Sanjak. In response to the Saqr's attack on an Ottoman government convoy in Jabal Nablus en route to Jerusalem, Jazzar launched an offensive against them, killing Zamil. In 1778, the Saqr renewed their raids against the villages in Jazzar's domains and partly destroyed the waterworks around Acre. Jazzar launched a counterattack with support from the local Druze and by the end of 1783, soundly defeated them and reestablished security for the villages and on the roads. By 1801, the Bedouin of the Lower Galilee and around Mount Tabor, probably the Saqr, were reported by a traveler to have remained in a state of rebellion and that Jazzar had launched a large-scale campaign against them. By the end of his rule in 1804, Jazzar's stringent military measures against the Saqr and the Bedouin in general led to long-term security in the Galilee from Bedouin depredations for the following decades.

==== Late Ottoman period ====
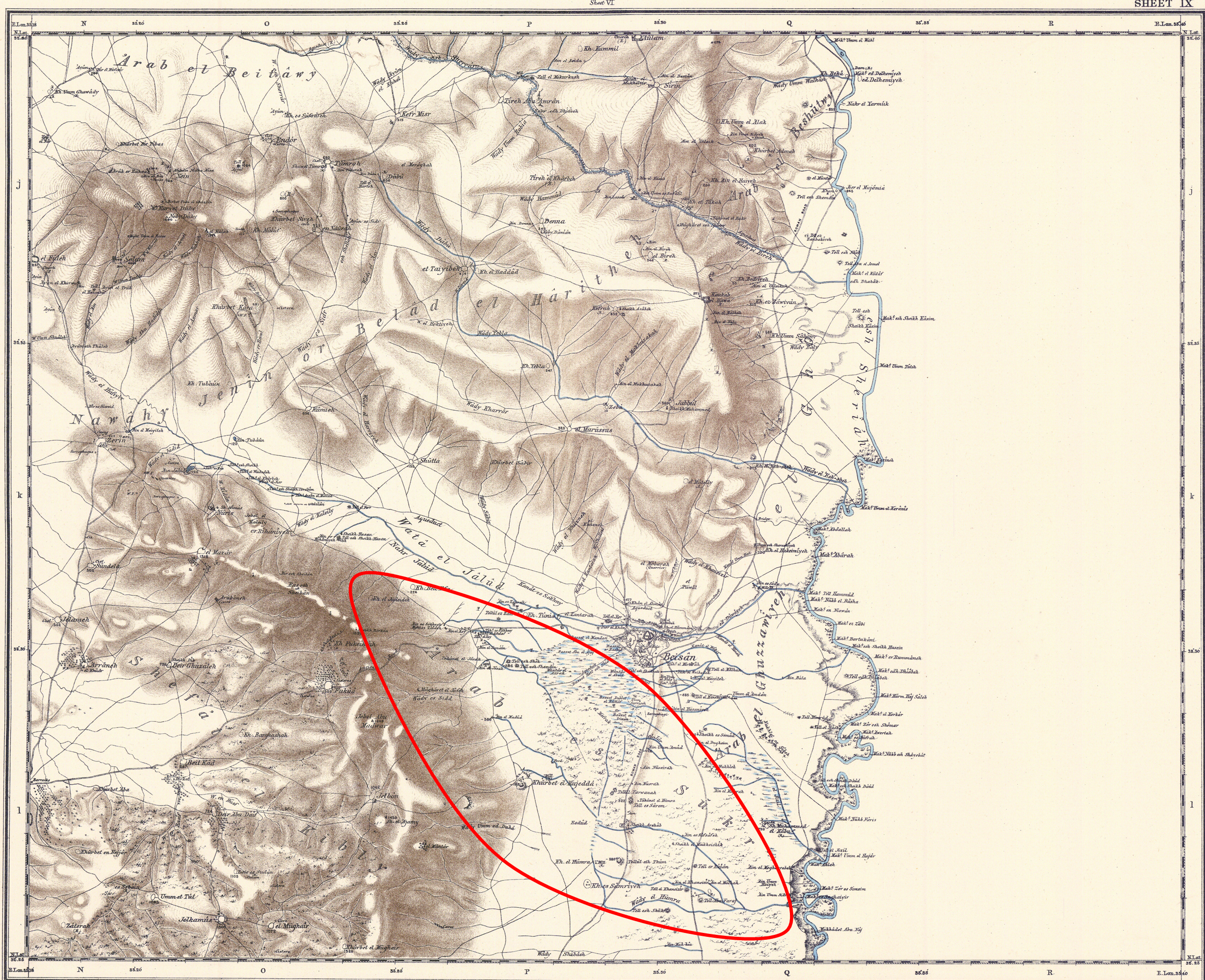
Tribal area of the Saqr (labeled 'Arab es Sukr') in the Beisan Valley, as shown on the Survey of Western Palestine, 1872–1877

The Saqr were estimated to have 300 horsemen by A. Jaubert in 1812. The Swiss traveler Johann Ludwig Burckhardt mentioned the Saqr as one of three Bedouin tribes inhabiting the River Jordan valley in the vicinity of Tiberias in 1816. The Saqr were reported to "have possession of the Ghor [Beisan Valley]" by scholars Edward Robinson and Eli Smith in 1852. Likewise, in 1863, Henry Baker Tristram reported that "the whole" of the Beisan Valley was in the control of Bedouin tribes, including the Saqr. Clashes were reported between these Bedouins and the settled Arabs in the adjacent hill country by C. R. Conder.

The Ottoman government instituted its landmark Land Code in 1858 to regulate land ownership, abolish the previous system of tax farming and restore government control of state land; the lands of the Beisan valley were considered state land by the government. In 1874, the Palestine Exploration Fund's Tyrwhitt Drake estimated the size of the Saqr of the Beisan Valley and Wadi al-Jalud at 400 men in 150 tents and noted they were the largest tribe there and owned most of the cattle, sheep and goat herds; they formerly possessed many horses and camels but these were reduced following the tribe's suppression by the governor of Nablus, Muhammad Sa'id Pasha, in c. 1866. Population registers from 1881 to 1885 recorded that the population of the Saqr in the valley was about 1,000; the next largest tribe, the Ghazzawiyya numbered 500. At that time, in 1882, Sultan Abdul Hamid II (r. 1876–1909) registered the lands of the Beisan valley in his name, with the Bedouin, including the Saqr, who lived there required to pay a tithe on the lands they inhabited amounting to one-tenth of the agricultural output.

The government strove to settle the nomadic Bedouin and by the 1900s the tribes of the Beisan Valley had become largely stationary and paid their taxes. A 1915 government study commissioned by the Ottoman governor of Beirut Vilayet surveyed the valley and noted that the Saqr numbered 2,500 to 3,000 tribesmen and cultivated 12,500 dunams of land. A 1917 report indicated a "semi-Bedouin" population in the valley of 6,000, with the Saqr concentrated west of the town of Beisan, alongside 4,000 fellahin (peasants).

=== British Mandatory period ===
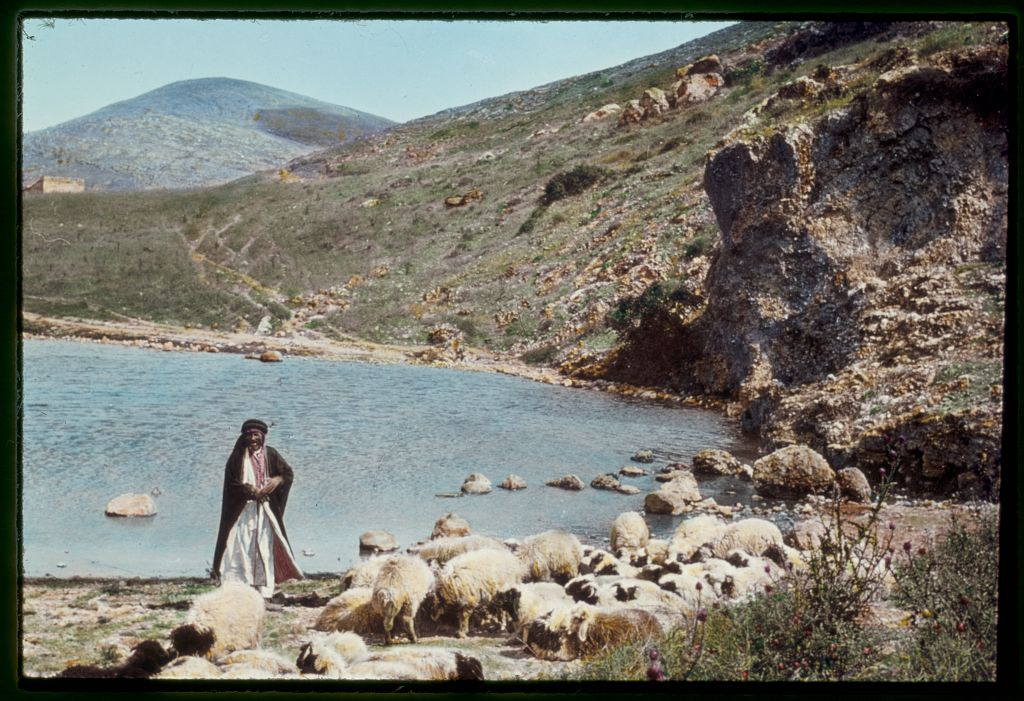
Bedouin shepherd grazing his flock at the Ain Jalud spring of the Wadi al-Jalud (Harod Valley), the upper limit of the Saqr's tribal area, 1950

The British conquered Palestine in 1917 during World War I and the British Mandate government of Palestine was established in 1920. The British initially maintained the Ottoman land system, registering the sultan's lands as state land with the Bedouin paying taxes and continuing the process of sedenterization that had begun in the 1880s. The 1922 census and a 1923 document clarifying its data for the Beisan valley showed the Saqr tribe population divided into those under the leadership of Yusel al-Irsan, numbering 484 persons, and those under Abdullah al-Husayn, numbering 1,037 persons. In addition, the Saqr subtribes or settlements of Umm Ajra, Arab al-Safa and Khuneizir were counted separately and collectively numbered 424 persons.

In a 1921 profile of Beisan by an anonymous correspondent of The Near East weekly, the Saqr are mentioned as one of the two principal tribes in Beisan's environs, their encampments extending as far north as the village of Shatta. They seasonally migrated south to the Jordan Valley during the summers. According to the report, they posed as "an element of insecurity" due to their habitual assistance to Bedouin raiders from east of the River Jordan and participation in their raids. According to Canaan, writing around this time, their sojourns in the Jordan Valley typically extended to Tubas but sometimes as far south as al-Auja and that this migration occurred during the winter (not the summer). In the summers they variously encamped in the districts of Nazareth, Jenin and Haifa. Their main tribal neighbors and persistent foes were the al-Ghazzawiyya to their north.

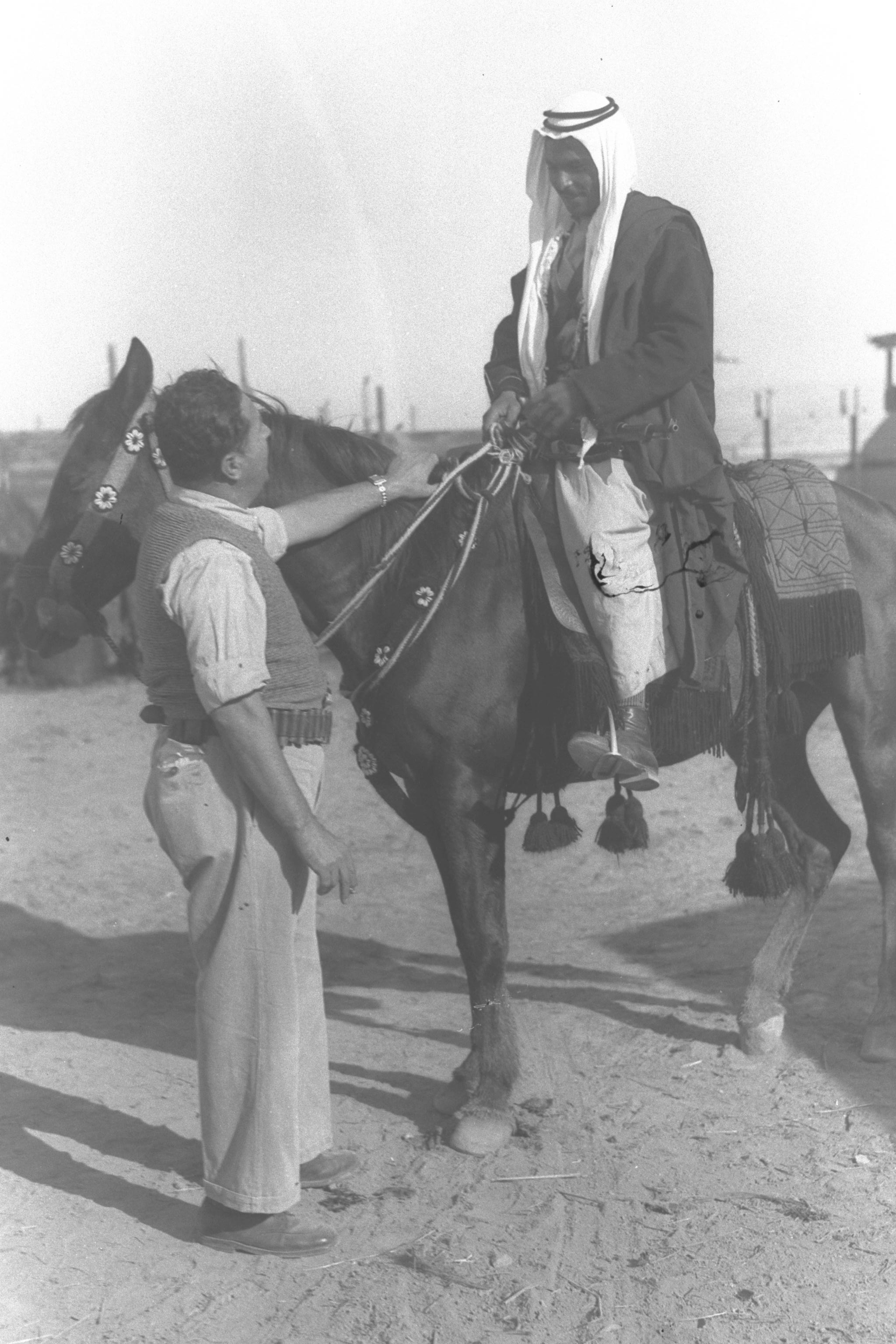
A Bedouin sheikh of the Beisan valley meeting with a Jewish member of the kibbutz Maoz Haim

The British administration reached the Ghor Mudawarra Land Agreement with the Bedouin sheikhs of the Beisan valley in 1921, enabling the tribes to communally purchase the agricultural and grazing lands they lived on for a nominal fee; the sheikhs would be the purchasers and the government entrusted the sheikhs "with the just allotment of the areas to individuals and with the collection and payment of taxes and tithes". The lands assigned to the villages of the valley spanned 202,361 dunams and those allotted to the tribal areas were 179,545 dunams. By 1926, over half of the lands covered in the agreement had been transferred to Arab owners. Nevertheless, the intention of the agreement to distribute lands to the Bedouin inhabitants of the valley largely failed to materialize, as some 93,000 dunams had been acquired by wealthy Arab absentee landlords, including the Husayni and Alami families of Jerusalem, by 1932, and 19,000 dunams had been sold off by Bedouin owners by 1936. Rathen than encourage Bedouin settlement, the land transfers fueled land speculation and the low-income transferees were motivated by the potential profits of selling the lands (each dunam cost the transferees 1.5 pounds while their annual household income was typically 4 to 7 pounds). In the 1931 census, the encampments of al-Irsan numbered 444 persons and additional Saqr villages and subtribes were counted: Arab al-Arida (182), al-Fatur (66), Khuneizir (200), al-Manshiya (546), al-Sakhina (372), Zarra'a (73), Arab al-Safa (536) and Umm Ajra (242). Based on the 1930 map survey, most of the Saqr dwellings listed in the 1931 census do not appear to be houses but the traditional camel-hair tents of the Bedouin.

In the 1945 population survey, the Saqr settlements had the following populations: Arab al-Arida (150), al-Fatur (110), al-Hamra (730), Khuneizir (260), al-Sakhina (530), Arab al-Safa (650), and Umm Ajra (260). British aerial maps from the same year showed scattered tents at Arab al-Safa and Arab al-Arida and little or no indication of dwellings at al-Sakhina, Khuneizir, al-Hamra and Umm Ajra. Around 4,500 dunams of al-Hamra's lands inhabited by the Saqr were owned by absentee landlords from the Mutliq family. By 1946, the Jewish National Fund and other Jewish groups had purchased nearly 30% of the lands transferred to Arab owners by the Ghor-Mudawarra Land Agreement and by 1947 there were twelve Jewish settlements established in the Beisan valley, about half affecting Bedouin tribal areas, a process that had begun in the 1930s. The land sales were largely facilitated by middlemen, including many of the wealthy Arab absentee landlords. The Jewish settlement in the area and cultivation of lands formerly under Bedouin ownership had led to clashes between the settlers and the Saqr villagers of Arab al-Safa, Arab al-Arida and Umm Ajra in the late 1930s.

Most of al-Sakhina's lands had been owned by the Zubaydat subtribe of the Saqr and were purchased by the JNF for the settlement of Nir David. According to representatives of the Palestine Arab Party, the inhabitants had been deceived to sell their lands to Arab middlemen on the condition they would be able to remain in place, cultivate, and graze their flocks. The purchaser then sold the lands to the JNF, which evicted the Saqr tribesmen. These tribesmen, numbering 403 persons with 1,034 livestock, were relocated to state land in al-Ashrafiyya where they were to pay 20% of their output to lease the land. Part of the lands at al-Ashrafiya where the Saqr were resettled were sold by the state to the JNF to the protest of the Arab National Fund and the sheikhs of the tribe. Representing them was Ahmed Hilmi Pasha, who wrote to the authorities that the JNF "was determined to Judaise the Beisan sub-district and evict the Arabs from it. This fills the Arabs with anxiety and fear regarding their future and will doom to extinction the life of the whole Sakr [sic] tribe".

=== 1947–1948 war ===
The 1947 UN Partition Plan for Palestine designated the Beisan Valley as part of the proposed Jewish state. At the time, the valley had an Arab majority of over 20,000 and a Jewish minority of 9,000. In the period between the UN vote and the declaration of the state of Israel on 14 May 1948, Zionist forces moved to occupy the Arab-populated areas of the valley. Some of the semi-nomadic Bedouin began to move across the river into the Emirate of Transjordan in February 1948. A letter by two Saqr sheikhs to Emir Abdullah of Transjordan dated 9 May indicated that at least part of the tribe had already relocated from the valley to the area of Irbid in Transjordan due to several attacks against them by Jewish forces.

On 11 May, the Golani Brigade of the Haganah, the principal Jewish militia in Palestine, launched Operation Gideon and occupied Tell al-Hisn, a strategic mount overlooking Beisan, and began shelling the town and nearby settlements. Palestinian and Transjordanian forces backed by the Saqr made a failed attempt to repulse them and the Jewish forces afterward occupied Beisan, Farwana and al-Ashrafiya. They proceeded to take over Beisan's southern environs where the Saqr dwelt. Under their sheikh Fadl al-Irsan, the tribesmen put up resistance, some falling in battle but the Haganah prevailed. Save for a few dozen members, the bulk of the Saqr were expelled or fled to Transjordan. About 25 members of the Bani Rabi'a and 15 members of the Majali families, both belonging to the Saqr, relocated to Nazareth as internally displaced Palestinians.

== Culture ==
=== Social structure ===
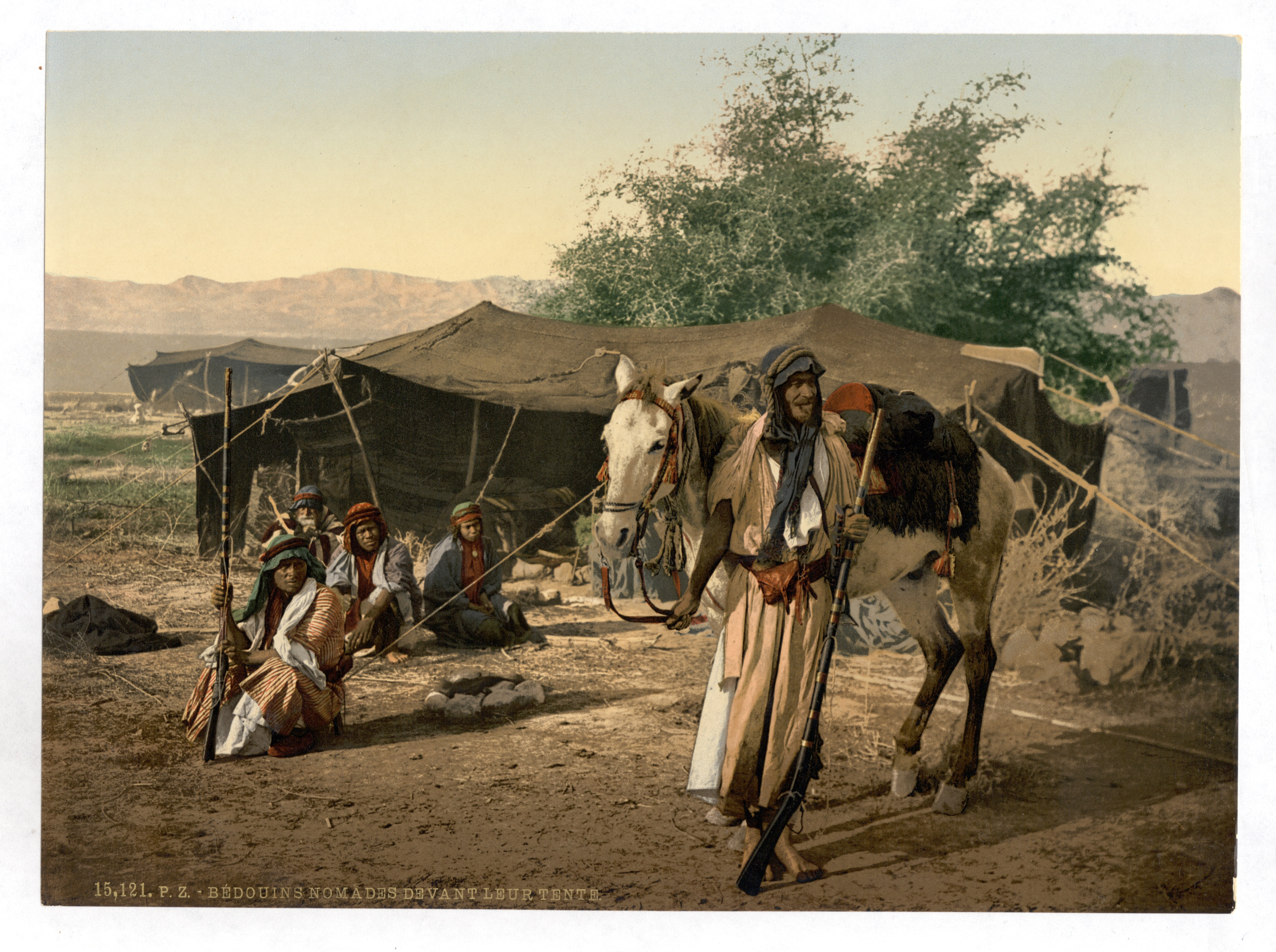
Bedouins and their camel-hair tents in the Galilee, 1890–1900

The tribe at the time of Canaan's profile consisted of multiple asha'ir (tribes), which in turn were divided into several hama'il (clans). According to Canaan, while both Saqr and the Abbad of the Balqa claimed all their tribesmen descended from a common ancestor, their constituents came from different lineages and regions. Part of these families were of 'true' Bedouin (nomadic) origin and others were descendants of ghawarina (people of the Jordan Valley) and black slaves whose ancestors were acquired by older generations of tribesmen. The slaves were freed and gradually became numerous to the extent they formed distinct clans within the Saqr, while the ghawarina were presumed to be descendants of the original inhabitants of the valley who were conquered by the Saqr and eventually incorporated into the tribe. The 'true' Bedouin families were divided between three strata: umara (princely families), shuyukh (chieftainly families) and fuqara (poor or humble) families. The fuqara were known for their medicinal knowhow and originally were part of the Nu'aym tribe, still venerating the Nu'aym's maqam (saintly-person shrine) at Izz al-Din Abu Hamra near Hama.

The umara families were the Khawabi, Mahdawi, and Bani Rabi'a, but overall leadership of the tribe rested with the preeminent leader of the shuyukh families, all of whom claimed descent from the Saqr's original ancestor Mallak and all of whom hoisted an ostrich feather over their tents to distinguish them from the other families. The five families constituting the shuyukh were the Zamil led by Sheikh Arif, the Wadi led by Husayn Ali al-Jabr, the Sulaybi led by Sheikh Muhammad, the Rabah led by Salim al-Uqab and the Muflih led by Abdullah Irsan. The largest family of the tribe were the Zubayd (a Bedouin 'commoner' family) and the Bani Rabi'a claimed to be Husayniyya, i.e. descendants of the Islamic prophet Muhammad's grandson Husayn ibn Ali.

=== Lifestyle ===
The Saqr maintained a semi-nomadic life into the late Ottoman and British Mandatory periods. Their lands in the Beisan valley were expropriated by Sultan Abdul-Hamid II in lieu of payment of several years' worth of the tribe's tax arrears. The Saqr were officially permitted to continue cultivating the lands with 20% of their revenues paid as taxes and rent to the Ottoman government. Under the British administration, Saqr tribesmen were allowed to take up full legal possession of the lands they cultivated for a one-time payment. Most of the cultivated lands were grown with grain and lied in the valley east of the town of Beisan and some were located in the Bilad al-Haritha area in the Jenin district. The other main source of income was cattle raising; the tribe moved with their cattle during their seasonal migrations.

=== Traditions ===
In marriage, a Saqr tribesman could wed a woman from his own strata or from a lower class within the tribe. The boys of the tribe were typically circumcised at the age of fifteen. Internal disputes were typically arbitrated by either a judge from the Saqr's Qazazma subtribe or a judge of the Abbad and the role of judge was hereditary. For serious crimes like murder or rape, the offending tribesmen and his property were put at the mercy of the victim's family except when the offender took up temporary protection under one of the tribe's respected sheikhs, in which case his safety was considered inviolable during this period. Punishments included either a hefty fine or a seven-year exile. Generally, tribesmen sought financial assistance from within the tribe for matters such as marriage, purchase of a horse or atonement for a crime. The tribesmen honored several saints whose shrines were located in different parts of the Jordan Valley, including Bardala, al-Arida, Beisan, al-Hamra, Khneizir and near Tubas.

=== Affiliations and rivalries ===
In the political division of Palestine's inhabitants into the Qays and Yaman factions that existed to the end of the Ottoman period, the Saqr were part of the Yaman. Their natural allies among the Bedouin tribes included the Beni Sakhr and Abbad of the Balqa, the Sardiyya of the Hauran, Bashatwa of Jisr al-Majami, the Jabarat of Gaza, Bani Hamida of al-Karak, the Balawni of Jabal Ajlun and the Turkmen tribes of Marj Ibn Amer. Their enemies were the Adwan of the Balqa, the Bani Hasan of az-Zarqa, the Ghazzawiyya of the Beisan valley, the Fuheil of the Hauran, and the Masa'id of Wadi al-Far'a. The enmity with the Saqr's Ghazzawiyya neighbors was due to the killing of two Ghazzawiyya nobles by the Saqr and the enmity with the Adwan was due to the Saqr's intervention on the side of the Abbad when they were attacked by the Adwan.

== Bibliography ==
- Burckhardt, John Lewis (1831). Notes on the Bedouins and Wahábys, Vol 1. London: Henry Colburn and Richard Bentley.
- Canaan, Tawfiq (1936). "The Ṣaqr Bedouin of Bîsān". Journal of the Palestine Oriental Society. 16: 21–32.
- Cohen, Amnon (1973). Palestine in the 18th Century: Patterns of Government and Administration. Jerusalem: The Magnes Press. ISBN 978-0-19-647903-3.
- Drake, Tyrwhitt (1875). "Mr. Tyrwhitt Drake's Report". Quarterly Statement. London: Palestine Exploration Fund.
- Falah, Ghazi (1982). The Processes and Patterns of Sedentarization of the Galilee Bedouin 1880–1982 (doctoral thesis). Durham: Durham University.
- Imano, Taizo (Autumn 2024). "The Colonization of Palestine, and the Geography and History of the Bedouin Tribes in the Beisan District)". Journal of Palestine Studies (140): 63–82.
- Joudah, Ahmad Hasan (2013). Revolt in Palestine in the Eighteenth Century: The Era of Shaykh Zahir al-Umar (Second ed.). Gorgias Press. ISBN 978-1-4632-0002-2.
- Kark, Ruth; Frantzman, Seth J. (2010). "Bedouin, Abdül Hamid II, British Land Settlement and Zionism: The Baysan Valley and Sub-district 1831–1948". Israel Studies. 15 (2): 49–79. doi:10.2979/isr.2010.15.2.49.
- Mazarib, Tomer (2021). From Desert to Town The Integration of Bedouin Into Arab Fellahin Villages and Towns in the Galilee, 1700-2020. Liverpool: Liverpool University Press. ISBN 9781789761535.
- Peake, Frederick Gerard (1934). A History of Trans-Jordan and its Tribes, Vol. 2. Amman.
- Philipp, Thomas (2001). Acre: The Rise and Fall of a Palestinian City, 1730–1831. Columbia University Press. ISBN 978-0-231-50603-8.
- Rafeq, Abdul-Karim (1966). The Province of Damascus, 1723–1783. Beirut: Khayats.
- Sharon, Moshe (1999). Corpus Inscriptionum Arabicarum Palaestinae, Volume Two: B–C. Leiden, Boston and Köln: Bril. ISBN 90-04-11083-6.
- Suwaed, Muhammad Youssef (2016). "The Bedouins in the Galilee in the War of Independence of Israel 1948–1950". Middle Eastern Studies: 1–17. doi:10.1080/00263206.2016.1240677.
- Tyler, W. P. N. (April 1989). "The Beisan Lands Issue in Mandatory Palestine". Middle Eastern Studies. 25 (2): 123–162.
