= Ashrafiya =

Al-Ashrafiyah (also spelled Ashrafiyah, Ashrafiyye, Ashrafiyeh, Ashrafiyya, or Achrafieh) is an Arabic word that could refer to the following places:

== Jordan ==
- Ashrafiyah, Amman, a neighborhood in Amman and the highest point in the city
- Ashrafiyah, Irbid, a neighborhood in Irbid
- Ashrafiyah, Mafraq, a neighborhood in Mafraq

== Lebanon ==
- Achrafieh, a district of Beirut

== Palestine ==
- Al-Ashrafiyya, a depopulated Palestinian village in Galilee near Baysan

== Syria ==
- Ashrafiyah, Hama, a village in al-Suqaylabiyah district near Hama
- Ashrafiyah, Homs, a village near Homs
- Ashrafiyat Sahnaya, a village in the Darayya district near Damascus
- Ashrafiyat al-Wadi, a village in the Qudsaya district near Damascus
- Khanazir, also known as Ashrafiya, a village in Masyaf district near Hama

== See also ==
- Ashrafiyya (disambiguation)
- Ashrafi (disambiguation)
- Ashraf (disambiguation)
