= Abida =

Abida (Arabic: عابدہ) is a feminine given name. The masculine version of the name is Abid. It means the one who worships. Notable people with the name include:

- Abida (biblical figure), biblical figure and son of Midian
- Abida Azeem, Pakistani politician
- Abida Mia, Malawian politician
- Abida Parveen (born 1954), Pakistani Sufi singer
- Abida Sultan (1913–2002), Indian princess
- Abida Taherani (died 2016), Pakistani educationist and scholar
- Syeda Abida Hussain (born 1948), Pakistani politician

Other things called or related to "Abida" include:

- Abida (genus), a genus of small snails

== See also ==
- Abad (disambiguation)
- Abadi (disambiguation)
