= Ebadi =

Ebadi (Persian: عبادی; Chinese: 伊巴迪; Hebrew: אבאדי; Japanese: エバディ) is a common family name in Iran and Afghanistan. Ebadi may refer to:

- Ahmad Ebadi (1906–1993), musician and setar-player
- Hassan Ebadi (born 1986), strongman competitor
- Shirin Ebadi (born 1947), lawyer and human rights activist

== Similar surnames ==
- Ibadi (disambiguation) (Arabic)
- Abadi (disambiguation) (Hebrew)
- Ebata (Japanese)
- Bai (disambiguation) (Chinese)
- Abad (disambiguation) (Hispanic)
- Badia (disambiguation) (Spanish/Italian)
