= Abadi =

Abadi (Persian: آبادی) may refer to:

- Abadi (newspaper), a defunct Indonesian daily newspaper
- Abadi (surname), a list of people with the name
- Abadi (rural locality), a type of place in Iran
- Abadi, Khuzestan, a village in Iran
- Abadi, Razavi Khorasan, a village in Iran
- Abadi language, an Oceanic language of Papua New Guinea

== See also ==
- Abad (disambiguation)
- Abida (disambiguation)
