= Ashrafiyya =

Ashrafiyya (Arabic: الأشرفية) may refer to:

- Dar al-Hadith al-Ashrafiyya, an Islamic school of scholars like al-Mizzi in 12th-century Damascus
- Madrasa al-Ashrafiyya, a school built in c. 1481 on the western border of the Haram al-Sharif, Jerusalem
- Al-Ashrafiyya, a Palestinian Arab village in the District of Baysan
- Ashrafiya, a neighborhood in Amman, Jordan

== See also ==
- Ashrafiya (disambiguation)
- Ashrafi (disambiguation)
- Ashraf (disambiguation)
