= Ibn Abbad =

Ibn Abbad (or Ibn ʿAbbād) may refer to:

- Sahib ibn Abbad (938–995), Persian scholar and statesman
- Benavert (fl. late 11th century), or Ibn ‘Abbād, Emir of Syracuse and last Emir of Sicily
- Ibn Abbad al-Rundi (1333–1390), Andalusi Sufi theologian
- members of the Abbadid dynasty of Seville

== See also ==
- Abbadi (disambiguation)
