= ABAD =

ABAD may refer to:

- Amyloid-β peptide (Aβ) binding alcohol dehydrogenase
- ABAD, a television transmitter in Alice Springs, Australia, which broadcasts the television station ABD (TV station)
- ABAD (statutory corporation), a public legal entity to carry out socially oriented projects in Azerbaijan

== See also ==
- Abad (disambiguation)
