= Ibadi (disambiguation) =

Ibadi may refer to:

- Ibāḍī (Arabic: اباضی or اباضیه), member of a sect of Islam separate from the Sunni and Shia sects
- ʿIbādī (Arabic: عبادی), also spelled as Ebadi, member of a Christian Arab community in al-Hirah, now also a common surname in the Muslim world
- Ibadi (band), a Korean modern folk/acoustic pop band

== See also ==
- Ebadi (disambiguation)
