= Martín Abadi =

Argentinian computer scientist

- Born: 1963 (age 62–63); Argentina
- Education: PhD, Stanford University, 1987
- Known for: Burrows–Abadi–Needham logic Baby Modula-3; A Theory of Objects
- Scientific career
- Fields: Computer science Cryptography
- Workplaces: Google; University of California, Santa Cruz; Collège de France
- Doctoral advisor: Zohar Manna

Martín Abadi (born 1963) is an Argentine computer scientist, working at Google as of 2024. He earned his Doctor of Philosophy (PhD) in computer science from Stanford University in 1987 as a student of Zohar Manna.

He is well known for his work on computer security, on programming languages, and machine learning. In security, Abadi developed (with Michael Burrows and Roger Needham) the Burrows–Abadi–Needham logic for analyzing authentication protocols, and with Needham received the IEEE S&P Test of Time award for his work Prudent engineering practice for cryptographic protocols.

In programming language research, he published a book (with Luca Cardelli) A Theory of Objects, laying out formal calculi for the semantics of object-oriented programming languages. Additionally, In 1993, he published the programming language Baby Modula-3, a safe subset or sublanguage of Modula-3, based on functional programming and set theory ideals.

Abadi is a core developer for the machine learning framework Tensorflow. He has contributed to the development of differentially private stochastic gradient descent.

He is a 2008 Fellow of the Association for Computing Machinery. In 2011, he was a temporary professor at the Collège de France in Paris, teaching computer security. He was elected a member of the National Academy of Engineering in 2018 for contributions to the formal theory of computer security.

He is related to Moussa Abadi, a Syrian Jew, and a member of the French Resistance of World War II, and to investment banker and philanthropist Carlos Abadi.
