= Abdelrahman ElGendy =

Egyptian writer

- Born: Cairo, Egypt
- Education: Ain Shams University (BS); University of Pittsburgh (MFA); London School of Economics (MSc)
- Occupations: Author, Writer, Translator and Literary Editor
- Writing career
- Notable works: Huna: Memoir of Revolution, Prison, and Becoming
- Notable awards: National Book Award for Nonfiction (2026)
- Website: www.abdelrahmanelgendy.com

Abdelrahman ElGendy (Arabic: عبدالرحمن الجندي) is an Egyptian writer and translator. He is the author of Huna: A Memoir of Revolution, Prison, and Becoming; winner of the National Book Award for Nonfiction. ElGendy is a winner of the Samir Kassir Award for Freedom of Press.

== Early Life and Education ==
Abdelrahman ElGendy was born in Cairo, Egypt, where he grew up.

ElGendy was arrested from a protest alongside his father on October 6, 2013, at the age of 17, during a crackdown following the 2013 Egyptian coup d'état. In September 2014, he was sentenced to 15 years' imprisonment alongside dozens of other defendants in a mass trial. He was wrongfully tried as an adult despite having been a minor at the time of his arrest. After a retrial as a minor, his sentence was reduced to five years by the Court of Cassation in September 2020. He was released in January 2020 after more than six years in prison.

During his imprisonment, ElGendy wrote about prison life, and some of his writings were smuggled out of prison and circulated online. He began publishing in prison with Mada Masr. He also pursued and completed his engineering studies while incarcerated.

Following his release, ElGendy moved to the United States, where he earned an MFA in creative nonfiction writing at the University of Pittsburgh.

In 2024, ElGendy received the Samir Kassir Award for Freedom of Press for his essay "Is There Life Before Death?", published in the Egyptian news outlet Al Manassa.

In April 2025, ElGendy left the United States and relocated to Europe, citing fears of deportation to Egypt amid increased immigration enforcement under the second Trump administration. In 2026, he earned an MSc in Human Rights and Politics from the London School of Economics and Political Science.

== Career ==
=== Journalism and literary nonfiction ===
Following his release from prison in January 2020, ElGendy developed a career in journalism and literary nonfiction. In 2021, he published Anatomy of an Incarceration, a multipart series of essays in the independent Egyptian news outlet Mada Masr. Drawing on his experiences in detention, the series examined the social and psychological dimensions of imprisonment, including prison hierarchies, relationships between inmates, and the effects of prolonged incarceration.

His subsequent journalism and essays explored political repression, authoritarianism, displacement, and the relationship between personal experience and broader political structures. A recurring theme in his work is the intersection of domestic and international systems of oppression, particularly how Western foreign policy, migration policies, and geopolitical conflicts shape the lives of Egyptians, Palestinians, and other Arab communities. He has also written about transnational solidarity and the connections between struggles for political freedom across national borders.

His work has appeared in publications including The New Yorker, TIME, The Washington Post, Foreign Policy, The Baffler, The Nation, and The Los Angeles Review of Books.

=== Literary translation ===
Alongside his nonfiction writing, ElGendy works as a literary translator from Arabic into English, translating poetry and prose by contemporary Arab writers. His translations have appeared in literary journals and publications including Ploughshares, AGNI, Poetry Northwest, Words Without Borders, Literary Hub, The Margins, and The Baffler.

His translations include poems by Egyptian poets Ahmed Douma and Mostafa Ibrahim, as well as prose by Palestinian writer Mahmoud Darwish. His translation of Douma's poetry has appeared in AGNI, Poetry Northwest, Words Without Borders, and The Baffler.

In 2026, ElGendy and Mostafa Ibrahim received the inaugural John Skoyles Prize for Poetry from Ploughshares for Ibrahim's poem "So-and-So", translated from Arabic by ElGendy. The award recognized the translation and the original poem, which had appeared in the journal's Winter 2025–26 issue.

=== Huna ===
In September 2026, ElGendy published his debut memoir, Huna: A Memoir of Revolution, Prison, and Becoming, through Hogarth, an imprint of Penguin Random House. The memoir recounts his arrest as a teenager, his imprisonment in Egypt, and the relationship between personal memory, political repression, and the experience of exile.

In November 2026, Huna won the National Book Award for Nonfiction.

== Critical reception of Huna ==
Huna received a starred review from Kirkus Reviews, which described it as an "uncompromising work" and praised its treatment of imprisonment, resistance, and the relationships between prisoners. Publishers Weekly also reviewed the memoir positively, highlighting its portrayal of prison society, solidarity among inmates, and the psychological effects of incarceration.

The memoir received further coverage in literary and cultural publications. In Mizna, Nour Eldin Hussein's review, "Litterateur as Saboteur", situated the book within the tradition of Arab prison literature, examining its treatment of political power, resistance, and solidarity among incarcerated people across national and political contexts. In The Markaz Review, Egyptian writer Yasmine El Rashidi reviewed the memoir in the context of literature about the Egyptian revolution and its aftermath.

In Middle East Eye, Asim Qureshi's review, "In Egypt, leaving prison does not mean escaping the security state", examined the continuing effects of imprisonment after release and situated ElGendy's experiences within the broader operation of Egypt's security apparatus. The review also connected the memoir's account of Egyptian political repression with the country's international relationships and its role in the regional political order.

In The Jamia Review, Syed Kabeer Hassan's essay "Reading Huna in Delhi" considered the memoir in relation to student protests and political repression in India, drawing connections between the experiences described in the book and political conditions in Delhi. In Everything Is Political, Elena Dudum's review, "The Ferocious Capacity to Love", explored the memoir's themes of political commitment, revolutionary solidarity, and resistance, including in the context of Palestine.

In May 2026, Huna was selected for the American Booksellers Association's Summer/Fall 2026 Indies Introduce program, which features debut books selected by panels of independent booksellers.

In 2026, the memoir was included in several annual book selections, including the New York Public Library's Best Books of 2026, Kirkus Reviews' Best Memoirs of 2026, and Debutiful's Best Debut Books of 2026.

In November 2026, Huna won the National Book Award for Nonfiction.

== Awards ==
2024: Samir Kassir Award for Freedom of Press, Opinion Piece category, for "Is There Life Before Death?", published in Al Manassa on 2 January 2024.

2026: National Book Award for Nonfiction, for Huna: A Memoir of Revolution, Prison, and Becoming.

== Books ==
Huna: A Memoir of Revolution, Prison, and Becoming (2026)

Published editions:

- United States: Hogarth, 1 September 2026. ISBN 9798217153602.
- United Kingdom: Oneworld Publications, 15 October 2026. ISBN 9781836433057.
- Netherlands: Huna: Een memoir over revolutie en gevangenschap. Jurgen Maas, 3 November 2026. Translated by Hester Tillenaar. ISBN 9789493397422.
- Lebanon: Huna (هُنا). Dar Nofal (Hachette Antoine), Beirut, forthcoming December 2026.

== See also ==
- National Book Award for Nonfiction
- Samir Kassir Award for Freedom of Press
- Kirkus Reviews
- Lists of Egyptians
- 2011 Egyptian revolution
