= Al-Ashraf =

Al-Ashraf (either from Arabic: الأشرف, romanized: al-ashraf, lit. 'the most noble', or الأشراف, al-ashrāf, 'the nobles') may refer to:

== People ==
- Ashrāf or al-Ashrāf, title for those claiming descent from the family of the Islamic prophet Muhammad
  - Barsbay (Al-Ashraf Al-Barsbay), Burji Mamluk sultan of Egypt (1422–1438)
  - Al-Ashraf Sha'ban, Mamluk Sultan (1363–1377)
  - Al-Ashraf Tuman Bay II, last Sultan of Egypt (1516–1517)
  - Al-Ashraf Umar II (1242–1296), Rasulid sultan, mathematician and astronomer

== Places ==
- Al Ashraf, Mecca, Saudi Arabia
- Al-Ashraf (Taiz), Yemen
- Najaf Al-Ashraf, Iraq

== See also ==
- Ashraf (disambiguation)
- Al-Ashraf Mosque in Cairo, built by Al-Ashraf Al-Barsbay
