= Samir Kassir Award for Freedom of Press =

The Samir Kassir Award for Freedom of Press (جائزة سمير قصير لحرية الصحافة) is an annual award established by the European Union in 2006 to honor the memory of Lebanese journalist Samir Kassir, who was assassinated on June 2, 2005, in Beirut. The award recognizes journalists from North Africa, the Middle East, and the Gulf who have distinguished themselves through the quality of their work and their commitment to human rights, democracy, good governance, and civic engagement. Each winner receives a €10,000 prize.

== History ==
The establishment of the Samir Kassir Award was announced on October 7, 2005, by the European Commission during a press conference in Beirut. The award was created to support journalists covering issues related to human rights, good governance, the rule of law, the fight against corruption, freedom of expression, democratic development, and citizen participation.

The Samir Kassir Foundation, launched on February 1, 2006, by friends of Samir Kassir, collaborates with the European Union to administer the award. The first award ceremony took place on June 2, 2006, marking the first anniversary of Kassir's assassination. Initially, the award was divided into two categories: best article and best master's thesis. Over the years, it evolved to focus on print journalism and later included categories for best opinion article, best investigative article, and best audiovisual news report. The 2020 edition also included a special Students' Award, granted by students from Lebanese universities, and since2021 by students from universities across the MENA region.

Since its inception, the Samir Kassir Award has been awarded 19 times, recognizing the work of 57 journalists and researchers, including 34 men and 23 women.

The award has been granted 18 times to Egyptian winners, 12 times to Syrian winners, 9 times to Lebanese winners, 5 times to Palestinian winners, 4 times to Iraqi winners, 3 times to Tunisian winners, and once each to Yemeni, Algerian, Jordanian, and Libyan winners.

== Jury Composition ==
The award jury comprises seven members of different nationalities and backgrounds, including four from the Arab world and three from European Union Member States. Jury members have included journalists, media professionals, human rights investigators, researchers, civil society representatives, and former government officials recognized for their contributions to advancing human rights.

== Winners ==
Year	Category	Winner	Country
2025	Best Opinion Article; Best Investigative Article; Best Audiovisual Report	Badar Salem; Marina Milad; Khalil Alashavi	Palestine; Egypt; Syria
2024	Best Opinion Article; Best Investigative Article; Best Audiovisual Report; Students	Abdelrahman ElGendy; Hadeel Arja; Aseel Sariah; Mohammed Abu Shahma	Egypt; Syria; Yemen; Palestine
2023	Best Opinion Article; Best Investigative Article; Best Audiovisual Report; Students	Inas Hakky; Mahmoud Elsobky; Mohamad Chreyteh; Inas Hakky	Syria; Egypt; Lebanon; Syria
2022	Best Opinion Article; Best Investigative Article; Best Audiovisual Report; Students	Ezzat el Kamhawi; Safaa Khalaf; Iman Adel; Rukaia Al-Abadi and Fatima Othman	Egypt; Iraq; Egypt; Syria / Lebanon
2021	Best Opinion Article; Best Investigative Article; Best Audiovisual Report; Students	Yehya Al-Yaqoubi; Sultan Jalabi; Hoda Zakaria and Mennatullah Hamdy / Hammadi Lassoued; Yehya Al-Yaqoubi	Palestine; Syria; Egypt / Tunisia; Palestine
2020	Best Opinion Article; Best Investigative Article; Best Audiovisual Report; Students	Rim Ben Rjeb; Mostafa Abu Shams; Dalal Mawad; Kamal Ayash	Tunisia; Syria; Lebanon; Iraq
2019	Best Opinion Article; Best Investigative Article; Best Audiovisual Report	Roger Asfar; Ali Al-Ibrahim; Youssef Ziraoui	Syria; Syria; Morocco
2018	Best Opinion Article; Best Investigative Article; Best Audiovisual Report	Miloud Yabrir; Asmaa Shalaby; Asaad Zalzali	Algeria; Egypt; Iraq
2017	Best Opinion Article; Best Investigative Article; Best Audiovisual Report	Issa Ali Khodr; Ghada El-Sharif; Asaad Zalzali	Syria; Egypt; Iraq
2016	Best Opinion Article; Best Investigative Article; Best Audiovisual Report	Maher Massoud; Mohammad Tarek; Matar Ismaeel	Syria; Egypt; Syria
2015	Best Opinion Article; Best Investigative Article; Best Audiovisual Report	Ayman Al-Ahmad; Hesham Mannaa; Mohammad Nour Ahmad	Syria; Egypt; Palestine
2014	Best Opinion Article; Best Investigative Article; Best Audiovisual Report	Mohamed Abo El-Gheit; Hanene Zbiss; Orwa Mokdad	Syria; Tunisia; Egypt
2013	Best Opinion Article; Best Investigative Article; Best Audiovisual Report	Ahmed Abu Draa; Doha Hassan; Luna Safwan	Egypt; Palestine; Lebanon
2012	Best Opinion Article; Best Investigative Article	Suleiman al-Khalidi; Pakinam Amer	Jordan; Egypt
2011	Best Opinion Article; Best Investigative Article	Ethar El-Katatney; Habib Battah	Egypt; Lebanon
2010	Best Opinion Article; Best Investigative Article	Mustafa Fetouri; Safaa Saleh	Libya; Egypt
2009	Best Opinion Article; Best Investigative Article	Mona Eltahawy; Carole Kerbage	Egypt; Lebanon
2008	Article; Thesis	Naela Khalil; Marwan Harb	Palestine; Lebanon
2007	Article Thesis	Ahmed Benchemsi; Rita Chemaly	Morocco; Lebanon
2006	Article Article	Habib Battah; Dina Abdel Mooty Darwish	Lebanon Egypt
