= Ethar El-Katatney =

Egyptian journalist

- Born: Saudi Arabia
- Occupation: journalist
- Years active: 2006–present

Ethar El-Katatney is a Saudi Arabian-born Egyptian journalist.

== Early life and education ==
Born in Saudi Arabia, raised in Egypt, and educated in Western schools, El-Katatney has an undergraduate business degree from the American University in Cairo where she was editor-in-chief of the student newspaper. As an undergraduate, she was selected as one of six students to blog on the AUC Website., and during her commencement she gave the graduation speech and was nominated for the Parent's Association cup. El-Katatney graduated in June 2011 with two graduate degrees from the same university, an MBA and an MA in television and digital journalism.

== Career ==
In 2006, El-Katatney travelled to England with Amr Khaled, the popular Egyptian televangelist, for a three-week youth training program. She later joined him in an Islamic talk show called Human Insights that aired Ramadan 2006, and was a participant in his reality TV show Steklovata which aired in 2010. She was eliminated in the semi-final episode, and was ranked third.

Her investigative piece Dangerous Blood on Hepatitis C in Egypt won second place in a program held by the International Center for Journalists in 2008, while her story The Business of Islam won the Economics and Business award in the CNN MultiChoice African Journalist of the Year 2009 award, making her the first Egyptian to win one of the prestigious awards. In addition, her story Identity Crisis 101 was the winner of the Anna Lindh Mediterranean Journalist Award in 2009.

El-Katatney travels all over the world for conferences promoting dialogue between different religions and cultures, most notably the Habib Ali Al Jifri Litaarafuu dialogue in Abu Dhabi that aimed to bridge the cultural gap created by the Jyllands-Posten cartoons. She has attended Islamic summer intensive programs in England, Saudi Arabia, and Yemen. While in Yemen, she wrote Forty days and Forty Nights... in Yemen, which was published by a London-based publishing house in March 2010.

In 2011, her op-ed titled "The Veiled Muslim Bogeygirl," won the Samir Kassir Freedom of the Press Award in Beirut.

El-Katatney is the Young Audiences Editor at The Wall Street Journal in New York City, building a multiple medium digital magazine aimed at 18-34 year olds, launching in 2020. Prior, she was the newsroom executive producer at AJ+ in San Francisco. She is a newsroom manager and strategist, an international award-winning journalist and an author. She has worked as a staff writer at Egypt Today, the leading current affairs magazine in the Middle East, and at its sister magazine Business Today Egypt. She was also a contributor at Muslimah Media Watch, a website that critiques how Muslim women are represented in the media and popular culture.
