= Ashraf (disambiguation) =

The Ashrāf (with a long second ā, lit. 'nobles') are persons descended, or claiming descent, from the family of the Islamic prophet Muhammad.

Ashraf (with a short second a) is an Arabic word meaning 'most noble'.

Ashraf may also refer to:

- Asharaf or Ashraf, a Somali clan claiming descent from Muhammad
- Ashraf, East Azerbaijan, a village in Keyvan Rural District, in the Central District of Khoda Afarin County, East Azerbaijan Province, Iran
- Ashraf (name), including a list of people with this name
- Behshahr, formerly Ashraf or Ashraf ol Belād, a city in Mazandaran, Iran
- Camp Ashraf, a camp in Iraq's Diyala province, headquarters of the exiled People's Mujahedin of Iran (PMOI/MEK)
- List of Ashrāf tribes in Libya

== See also ==
- Al-Ashraf (disambiguation)
- Ashrafi (disambiguation)
- Ashrafiya (disambiguation)
- Ashrafiyya (disambiguation)
