= Reshafim =

Kibbutz in northern Israel

Reshafim: רשפים (Hebrew)
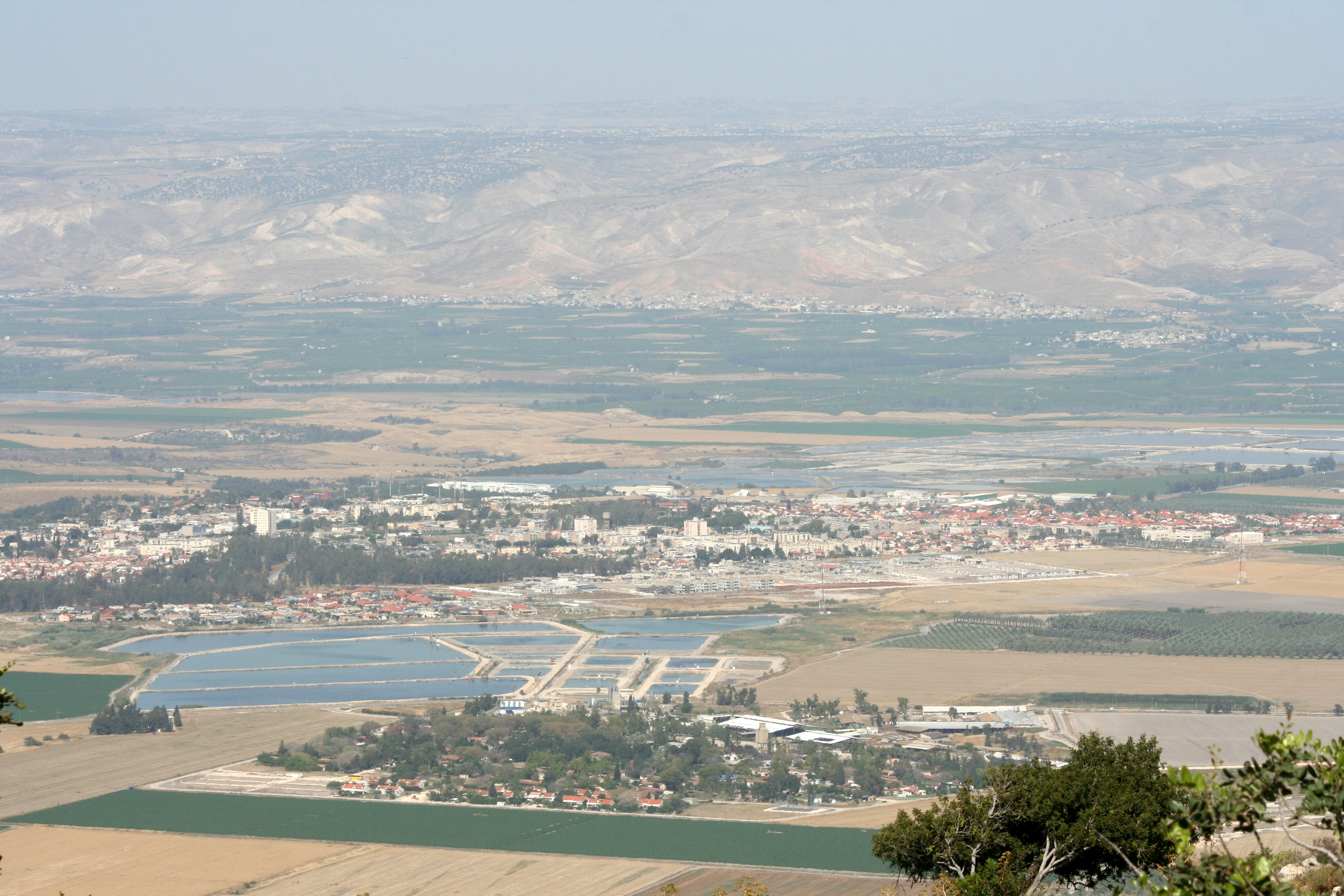
- Etymology: Sparks
- Location within Jezreel Valley region of Israel Location within Israel
- Coordinates: 32°28′53″N 35°28′38″E
- Country: Israel
- District: Northern
- Subdistrict: Jezreel
- Council: Valley of Springs
- Affiliation: Kibbutz Movement
- Founded: cooperative: 1944, settlement: 1948/49
- Founder: Hashomer Hatzair members
- Population (2024): 1,214
- Website: www.reshafim.org.il

Reshafim (Hebrew: רשפים, lit. 'Sparks') is a kibbutz in northeastern Israel. Located two kilometres to the south of the city of Beit She'an in the Beit She'an Valley, it falls under the jurisdiction of Valley of Springs Regional Council. In 2024 , it had a population of 1,214.

== History ==
The cooperative association was registered on 13 October 1944, as "Reshafim Kibutz Hashomer Hatzair Kvutzat Poalim Lehityashvut Shetufit Limited". A first settlement was established by Hashomer Hatzair members movement in 1947 at Kiryat Haim. In 1948 land was allocated to Reshafim that was located near the former Palestinian village of al-Ashrafiyya, which was depopulated after 10–11 May during the 1948 Arab–Israeli War. In 1949 the members and their children moved to the permanent location near Beit She'an.

For the first few months at the site, the members of kibbutz Reshafim lived temporarily in a camp jointly with the members of kibbutz Shluhot which belonged to the Orthodox Religious Kibbutz Movement. The camp was later broken up when both kibbutzim were established adjacent to each other.

The founder members were mostly Holocaust survivors from Romania and Bulgaria. They were joined by a small group of Israeli-born Sabras, and in 1949 by Polish refugees. In the 1950s a group of Argentine Jews and another group consisting mostly of Sephardic Jews joined the kibbutz. In the 1960s members were recruited from the Hashomer Hatzair youth movement and the Nahal from among the descendants of kibbutz members. With the decline of Western socialism and growing economic difficulties in the 1980s and 1990s population numbers stagnated.

== Economy ==
At its inception Reshafim was a classical kibbutz where all the means of production belonged to the commune and members received equal shares of services, products, and money as remuneration. During the 1990s a process of privatization began, culminating in members receiving salaries and having to pay for services.

In 2022 the commune still owns a dairy, orchards, fresh-water fishery, solar power installations, is partner in a chicken farm, an agricultural co-operative, and in a production facility for medicinal cannabis. It has sold all its shares in the Terraflex Industries plastics factory, but continued to own and lease its installations. The vast majority of the kibbutz members have found employment outside the kibbutz.
