= Shluhot =

Kibbutz in northern Israel

Shluhot: שְׁלוּחוֹת (Hebrew)
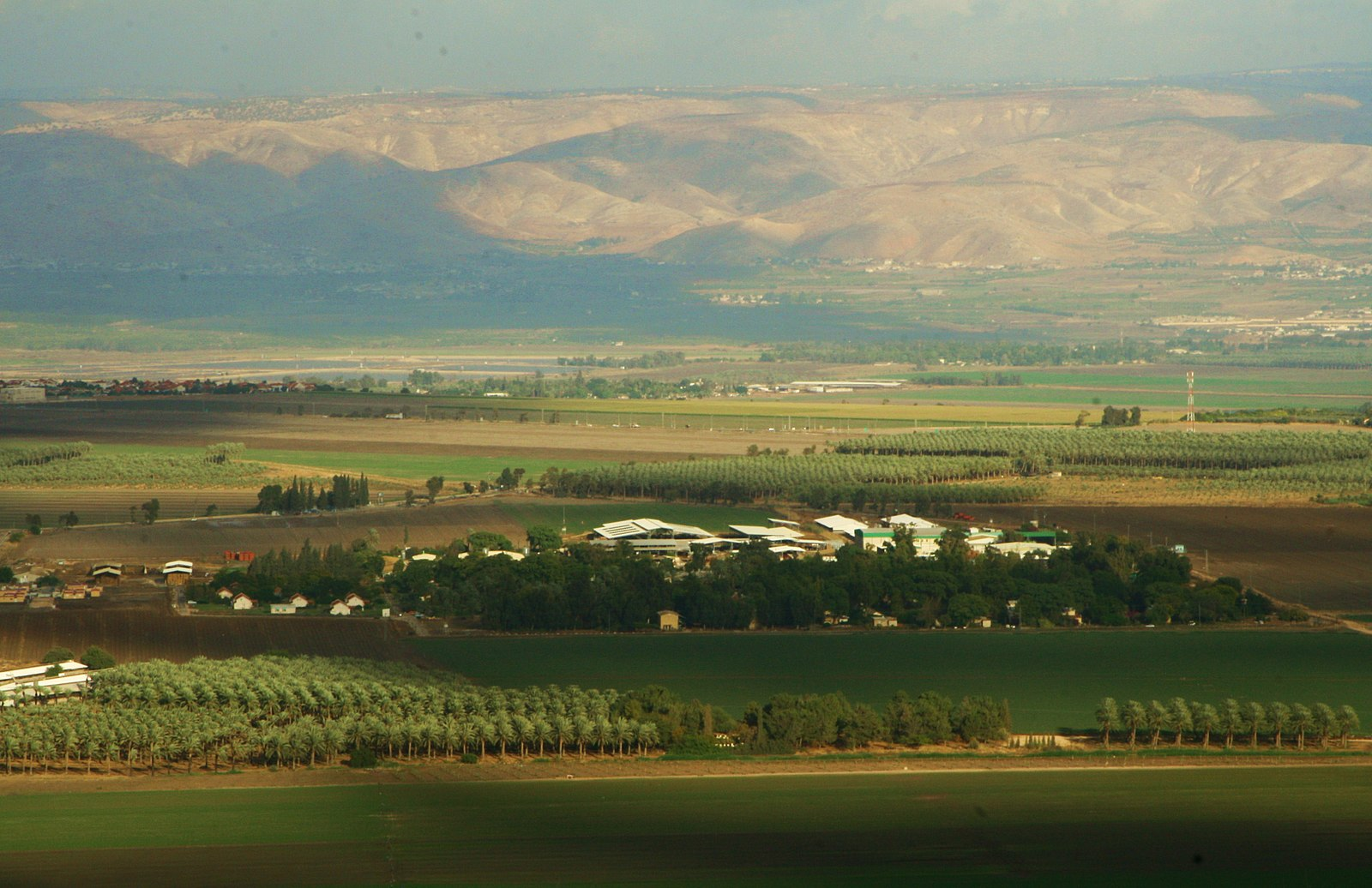

- Location within Jezreel Valley region of Israel
- Coordinates: 32°28′19″N 35°28′52″E
- Country: Israel
- District: Northern
- Subdistrict: Jezreel
- Council: Valley of Springs
- Affiliation: Religious Kibbutz Movement
- Founded: 1948
- Founder: Former Bnei Akiva members
- Population (2024): 540
- Website: www.shluhot.org.il

Shluhot (Hebrew: שְׁלוּחוֹת, lit. "Branches") is an Orthodox kibbutz in the Beit She'an Valley in northern Israel. Located about three kilometres south of the city of Beit She'an, it falls under the jurisdiction of Valley of Springs Regional Council. In 2024 it had a population of 540.

== History ==
Shluhot was founded in 1948 by former members of the Bnei Akiva Zionist youth movement, on the land of the depopulated Palestinian village of al-Ashrafiyya. Initially, a temporary camp was set up along with a group from the Hashomer Hatzair youth movement. After each group was assigned land for a kibbutz, the secular group members founded Reshafim.

Kibbutz Shluhot is one of four religious kibbutzim located in a cluster south of Beit She'an, from Shluhot at the base of Mount Gilboa, Ein HaNatziv and Sde Eliyahu to Tirat Zvi adjacent to the Jordan River.

In 2007 Shluhot began to host a special education school, Kulanu Academy, which teaches disabled children skills for adulthood and takes them on trips around Israel.

== Economy ==
Carrot processing wing

In the early years of the kibbutz, virtually all activity was centred on agriculture. In the last few decades new sources of revenue have been added. Today the economy is based on agriculture, manufacturing, and tourism. Agricultural branches include produce and livestock, with an emphasis on dairy farming, poultry (turkey and chicken coops), date farming, fish farming, orchards, and vegetable farming. Shluhot also has a carrot processing factory. In 2007, a cow from the dairy farm broke the Israeli record for most births, 14.

One of the oldest kibbutz factories is Microvue which produces microfilm readers/scanners, mostly for export. Microvue is one of the few microfilm reader manufacturers left in the world. Sheletron, founded in 1996, produces electronic display solutions through text, pictures, video, and animation on LCD screens.

In the early nineties, the kibbutz renovated a residential apartment building and turned it into a bed and breakfast, mainly geared for the Orthodox Jewish market. The kibbutz has since added a wider variety of accommodations, ranging from single rooms to multiple-room housing units. In 1996, former immigrants (olim) from North America founded a summer camp called Kayitz Bakibbutz, (in Hebrew "Summer on the kibbutz"), based on the typical 'American' sleepaway summer camp experience geared toward youth.

The kibbutz also has a metalwork shop that designs and produces machines for agricultural use.
