= Abad (surname) =

Abad is a Hispanic surname. Notable people with the surname include:

- Andy Abad (born 1972), American baseball player
- Antonio Abad (1894–1970), Filipino writer
- Carlos Abad (born 1995), Spanish footballer
- Carmencita Abad (born 1933), Filipina actress
- Diego José Abad y García (1727–1779), Jesuit poet and translator in New Spain and Italy
- Fernando Abad (born 1985), Dominican baseball player
- Gémino Abad (born 1939), Filipino poet
- José Gómez Abad, (1904–1993), Spanish painter
- Margot Abad, Argentine film actress
- Mercedes Abad (born 1961), Spanish journalist and short story writer
- Pacita Abad (1946–2004), Filipina painter
- Pere Esteve i Abad (1942–2005), Catalan politician
- Héctor Abad Gómez (1921–1987), Colombian human rights leader
- Héctor Abad Faciolince (born 1958), Colombian novelist
