= Ebata =

Origin
- Language: Japanese

Ebata (written: えばた, 恵畑, 江畑, 江幡) is a surname. Notable people with the surname include:

- Mutsuki Ebata (江幡 睦; born 1991), Japanese kickboxer
- Rui Ebata (江幡 塁; born 1991), Japanese kickboxer
- Yukiko Ebata (江畑 幸子; born 1989), Japanese volleyball player

== See also ==
- Obata
