= Mercedes Abad =

Spanish journalist and short story writer (born 1961)

Mercedes Abad (born 1961, in Barcelona, Spain) is a Spanish journalist and short story writer.

== Early life and career ==
She graduated in Journalism from the Universitat Autònoma de Barcelona after studying for her baccalaureate at the Liceu Francès. Following several incursions into the world of cinema and theatre, in 1986 she won the Premio La sonrisa vertical, a prize for erotic narrative with her book of short stories Ligeros libertinajes sabáticos. She has published other collections of short stories: Felicidades conyugales (1989), Soplando al viento (1995) and more recently Amigos y fantasmas (2004, winner of the Mario Vargas Llosa NH Short Story Award for the best book of short stories in 2004); the novel Sangre (2000), and the humorous essay Sólo dime dónde lo hacemos (1991). Furthermore, she is the author of several plays and of various adaptations, including XXX, for the company La Fura dels Baus. She also works as a translator and currently collaborates with different media outlets.

Her short story Pasión defenestrante (Uncontrolled Passion) was included in Rainy Days - Días de lluvia: Short Stories by Contemporary Spanish Women Writers, an anthology edited by Montserrat Lunati, together with a translation into English.

== Books ==
- Slight Sabbath debaucheries (1986)
- Conjugal Congratulations (1989)
- Just tell me where we do it (1991)
- Blowing in the wind (1995)
- A dose of TNT Short story published in the Anthology The stories that count (1998)
- Blood (2000)
- Title yourself (2002)
- Friends and ghosts (2004)
- The neighbor below (2007)
- Legends of Bécquer (2007)
- Half a dozen robberies and a couple of lies (2009)
- The fat girl (2014)
- House for sale (2020)
