= Mukhtar Ashrafi =

Uzbekistani musician (1912–1975)

Mukhtar Ashrafi Muxtor Ashrafiy
- Born: 29 May 1912; Bukhara, Russian Empire (now Uzbekistan)
- Died: 15 December 1975 (aged 63) Tashkent, Uzbek SSR, Soviet Union
- Occupation: Composer

Mukhtar Ashrafovich Ashrafi (Note: Russian: Мухтар Ашрафович Ашрафи; Uzbek: Muxtor Ashrafovich Ashrafiy) (11 June [O.S. 29 May] 1912 – 15 December 1975) was a Soviet Uzbek composer. He was awarded the title People's Artist of the USSR in 1951. He became a member of the Communist Party of the Soviet Union in 1941 was awarded the Stalin Prize in 1943 and 1952. He is known as the author of the first Uzbek opera "Buran" (together with Sergei Vasilenko) and the first Uzbek symphony.

His daughter Muqadamma was a noted medievalist.

== Early life and education ==
Mukhtar Ashrafi was born on 29 May (11 June) 1912 in Bukhara. He grew up in the family of his father, a famous Bukhara singer and musician Ashrafzhan Hafiza. At the age of seven, Ashrafi began to play Uzbek folk instruments improvising on the dutar. In 1924, he entered Oriental Music School in Bukhara. In 1928, Ashrafi graduated a dutar class in Bukhara and entered the Samarkand Institute of Music and Choreography.

From 1934 to 1936, he studied in a composition class of Sergei Vasilenko at the Moscow Conservatory. In 1934, Ashrafi wrote Komsomol and pioneer songs, and in 1935-1936, he wrote lyrical songs on the words of Ruzuli, working on his first opera at the same time.

Together with his teacher, Sergei Vasilenko, Ashrafi wrote the first Uzbek opera “Buran” that was staged in 1939, starting the history of Uzbek Opera and Ballet Theater.

In 1941-1944, Ashrafi studied composition at the Leningrad Conservatory. In 1948, he graduated from the conducting faculty of the Leningrad Conservatory as an external student.

== Career ==
In 1942, Ashrafi created the first Uzbek heroic symphony. From 1943 to 1947, Ashrafi was a director of Alisher Navoi Uzbek Opera and Ballet Theater. Since 1944 Ashrafi was a teacher, and since 1953 - a professor at the Tashkent Conservatory.

In 1964-66 he was a director, artistic director and chief conductor of the Samarkand Opera and Ballet Theater, and since 1966 - a director, artistic director and chief conductor of the State Academic Bolshoi Theater of the Uzbek SSR in Tashkent.

From 1971 to 1975, Ashrafi was rector of the Tashkent Conservatory.

Ashrafi is the author of the books "Indian Diaries" (in Russian and Uzbek), "Music in my life", numerous articles in magazines and periodicals.

He died on 15 December 1975 in Tashkent.

== Awards and honours ==
- People's Artist of the USSR (6 December 1951)
- People's Artist of the Uzbek SSR (1939)
- Stalin prize 2nd class (1943)
- Stalin prize 3rd class (1952)
- State Hamza Prize (1970)
- Two Order of Lenin (6 December 1951 and 12 June 1972)
- Two Order of the Red Banner of Labour (22 December 1939 and 18 March 1959)
- Order of the Badge of Honour (31 May 1937)
- Medal "For Valiant Labour in the Great Patriotic War 1941–1945" (25 December 1944)

In 1976, Tashkent Conservatory was named after him. On the occasion of the 70th birthday of Ashrafi, on 11 June 1982, a museum was opened in the house where he lived and worked from 1967 to 1975. In 2019, a memorial evening of Ashrafi was held in the assembly hall of the Union of Composers and Bastakors of Uzbekistan.

== Selected works ==
Operas

- Buran (1939, with S. Vasilenko)
- Grand Canal (1941, with S. Vasilenko)
- Dilaram (1958)
- Heart of a Poet (1962)

Ballets

- Love Amulet (1969)
- Timur Malik (1970)
- Stoikost' (1971)
- Love and Dream (1973)

Orchestral works

- Symphony No. 1 "Heroic" (1942; awarded Stalin Prize)
- Symphony No. 2 "Glory to the Victors" (1944)
- Kantatu o Schast'ye (1952; awarded Stalin Prize)
- Oratorio Skazanie o Rustame (1974)
- Music for theater, films, etc.

== Controversy ==
Ashrafi was accused of plagiarism in 1959, and Dmitri Shostakovich concluded that the allegations were true. He was expelled from the Composers' Union, but later was allowed to return.
