= Abbadi (tribe) =

The Abbadi (Arabic : بنو عباد) are one of the largest Arab tribes in Jordan. Abbadi is the second most common surname in Jordan after Zoubi. They are descended from "Qahtan" (Arabic : قحطانيون)

The Abbaddi tribe are particularly concentrated in central Jordan and its capital Amman, but have significant presence throughout Jordan. In the 18th and 19th centuries, the tribe fought in bloody tribal battles with other Jordanian tribes, which resulted in either control of more lands or displacement as a result of these wars. Jordanian poets sung about the tribe's power and the spread of its territory, "Abbad from Stream to Stream ," Meaning that their lands extend from the Zarqa River to Al Bahath stream. This denotes the size of their monastery as well as their power.

== Branches ==
Historian Rox Bin Zaid Al-Azizi, in his book, A Landmark for Jordanian Heritage, noted that the Abbadi tribe is classified into two main groupings : Al-Jarūmiyyah and the Jabūriyyah.

Al-Jarūmiyyah includes Abbadi clans between the Zarqa torrent to the Wadi Shuaib stream, which is Al-Ardah area, Ayra, Al-Bireh, Yarqa, Wadi Shuaib, Jalad, Al-Rumaymin, and parts of the Jordan Valley, such as Maadi, the Jordan Valley, Damia Valley, Al-Malaha, and part of the Deir Alla area.

Al-Jabūriyyah includes Abbadi clans between the torrent of Wadi Shuaib to Wadi Al-Shita’, Marj Al-Hamam, Al-Bahat, Bayader, Wadi Al-Seer, Wadi Al-Seer, Al-Bassa, Iraq Al-Amir, Wadi Al-Shita’, Abu Al-Sus, Badr Al-Jadida, Mahes, Bilal, Umm Al-Aswad, Dabouq, Al-Rabahiya, and parts of Khalda.

The Al-Jarūmiyyah are divided into several clans:

1. Al-Hajjah
2. Al-Harith
3. Al-Khatalayn
4. Al-Ramadinah
5. Islamism
6. Al-Sanabara
7. Al-Ma'adat
8. Al-Ghanayem
9. Al-Manaseer
10. Al-Na’imat
11. Al-Yazijis.

The Al-Jabūriyyah are also divided into several clans:

1. Al-Salihin.
2. Al-Zayyat
3. Al-Taawiya
4. Al-Alaween
5. Al-Alwan
6. Al-Awamrah
7. Al-Mahasna
8. Al-Rahamna
9. Al-Jira
10. Al-Fiqhah

== Notable members ==
- Marouf al-Bakhit Al Abbadi (born 1947), Prime Minister of Jordan
- Hani Abbadi (died 2014), Jordanian politician
- Mamdouh Al Abbadi (born 1943) Jordanian Minister of Health
- Juma Abdullah Al Abbadi Jordanian diplomat
- Abd Al Salam Al Abbadi Minister of Awqaf Islamic Affairs and Holy Places in Jordan
- Hussein AlShebli Al Abbadi Secretary General of Jordan Hashemite Charity Organization
