= Odette Abadi =

Physician and member of the French Resistance during WWII (1914–1999)

- Born: 24 August 1914; Paris, France
- Died: 29 July 1999 (aged 84)
- Spouse: Moussa Abadi (m. 1959)
- Honors: Legion of Honour

Odette Abadi (née Rosenstock; 24 August 1914 – 29 July 1999) was a French physician, and member of the Resistance during World War II. She was a co-founder of the Réseau Marcel ("Marcel Network") which saved more than 500 Jewish children from death during The Holocaust. Although she was arrested and tortured by the Gestapo, she refused to divulge the locations of the hidden Jewish children and was sent to two concentration camps. After Bergen-Belsen concentration camp was liberated in 1945, Abadi continued her profession as a doctor, with a focus on tuberculosis.

On 29 July 1999, Abadi died by suicide and the Les Enfants et Amis Abadi organisation was created the following year by one of the children she saved. In 2008, a square in Paris was named "Place Moussa et Odette Abadi" as a tribute to the couple's work. On 28 October 2017, the "Square Odette et Moussa Abadi" was inaugurated in Nice in recognition of their work.

== Early life and education ==
Odette Rosenstock was born in Paris on 24 August 1914, to garment factory owners Camille and Marthe Rosenstock. She also grew up with a younger sister. Although born Jewish, her family did not practice the Jewish religion. Secretly, Rosenstock appreciated some of the principles and her Jewish background but hid her desires due to the Nazi movement in Germany. Concerned about injustice and the growth of Nazism, she began attending meetings and debates as a teenager. She graduated from high school in 1933 and began studying medicine.

Her 1939 medical doctoral thesis, Notes Sur Les Jouets Et La Protection Des Enfants, addressed children's toys and child protection.

== Career ==
=== Physician and inspector ===
After qualifying as a doctor during the Spanish Civil War, Rosenstock went to the Pyrenees in 1938 to welcome and rescue Spanish Republican refugees from the war. She returned to Paris to finish her medical studies and earned a diploma in hygiene-prevention. The next year, she met Moussa Abadi, a fellow doctor, in December 1939 through a mutual friend. After the Nazi invasion of France, her father fled to the south. However her mother and younger sister Simone were captured by the Nazis before they could join him, and sent to Auschwitz concentration camp where they both died. (Note: According to the French Odette Abaldi article, Odette's father lived throughout the war, having died in 1967.)

Rosenstock was appointed Medical Inspector of Social Security at the Evacuation Centers for Children of the Schools of the City of Paris, then Medical Inspector of Loiret Schools in Montargis. She stayed in these roles until October 1940, when anti-Jewish laws forced her out of a job. Unable to return to her former position, Rosenstock was hired as a temporary worker in Jewish dispensaries before they eventually closed and then as a midwife.

=== Réseau Marcel ===
During this time, Rosenstock remained in communication with Abadi who encouraged her to join him in Nice, where he had fled. In order to reach Nice, she swam across the river to get from Occupied France into the Free Zone. At the end of November 1942, she met up with refugee Moussa Abadi in Nice, and together they collected children left abandoned after their Jewish parents were arrested. She also worked for the Œuvre de secours aux enfants with her future husband. Eventually, using the resources provided by the Bishop of Nice, they co-founded the Réseau Marcel ("Marcel Network") which saved 527 Jewish children between 1943 and 1945 by hiding them within Catholic institutions. Both Rosenstock and Abadi obtained false papers identifying them as Christian as Vichy police began rounding up Jewish people. Under the false name of Sylvie Delattre, Rosenstock acted as a social worker for the Church and approached Protestant families, while Abadi sought convents and Catholic schools to hide the Jewish children. Through word of mouth, Jewish parents learnt about the Réseau Marcel and preemptively left their children with the couple before leaving for the camps or attempting to flee. Using the Churches resources, Rosenstock and Abadi falsified baptism certificates and gave Jewish children a new identity.

== Concentration camps ==
On 25 April 1944, Rosenstock was arrested interrogated and tortured by the Gestapo before being deported to concentration camps. During the interrogation, she refused to divulge any information despite the promise of release in return. After realizing the reality of her arrest, Abadi fell into deep distress and was encouraged to seek refuge in the hinterland. However, he refused to abandon the children and often slept alone in the Church.

Rosenstock was firstly sent to Auschwitz-Birkenau before being moved to Bergen-Belsen, where she contracted typhus. While in Auschwitz-Birkenau, she was appointed a doctor under the guidance of Josef Mengele, although she lacked many medical necessities. In documents released after the war, she revealed a previously unknown protocol for combatting contagious diseases, which was that when infected individuals were discovered, their entire block was sent to the crematoria. After Allied troops liberated the captives at Bergen-Belsen in April 1945, Moussa Abadi received a note in Nice that read “Odette is alive.”

== Post-war career and life ==
Upon their reconnection in Nice, Rosenstock married Moussa Abadi in 1959, becoming Odette Abadi. They were married legally at the town hall of the 12th arrondissement, and later through a religious ceremony performed by Rabbi Farhi. They spoke little about the Réseau Marcel and their work during the war.

During and after the war, Abadi continued her profession as a doctor, with a focus on tuberculosis, and her husband became a theater critic. From 1978 until 1994, she worked as a doctor at a private college for those with hearing difficulties called Cours Morvan. In the 1980s, she was awarded the Legion of Honor and Silver Medal of the National Academy of Medicine. She also wrote a book about her time in concentration camps during WWII called Terre de détresse which was published in 1995.

Moussa Abadi died in 1997 and two years after her husband's death, Abadi died by suicide in Paris on 29 July 1999. She left behind a suicide note addressed to the children that she had helped to save.

== Legacy ==
Les Enfants et Amis Abadi organisation was created on 4 May 2000 by one of the children saved by the Abadis, Jeannette Wolgust. Its purpose is to bring together the children hidden by the couple and preserve their memory. On 13 September 2008, a square in Paris was named "Place Moussa et Odette Abadi" as a tribute to the couple's work. On 28 October 2017, the "Square Odette et Moussa Abadi" was inaugurated in Nice in recognition of their work.

== Bibliography ==
- Coleman, Fred (2013). The Marcel Network: How One French Couple Saved 527 Children from the Holocaust. Potomac Books, Inc. ISBN 978-1-61234-512-3.
- Paldiel, Mordecai (2000). Saving the Jews: Amazing Stories of Men and Women who Defied the "final Solution". Schreiber. ISBN 9781887563550.
- Bartrop, Paul R.; Lakin, Samantha J. (10 May 2019). Heroines of Vichy France: Rescuing French Jews during the Holocaust. ABC-CLIO. ISBN 9781440852336.
