= Abad, Khuzestan =

Abad آباد
- Village
- Location within Iran
- Coordinates: 30°24′55″N 50°04′47″E
- Country: Iran
- Province: Khuzestan
- County: Behbahan
- Bakhsh: Zeydun
- Rural District: Sardasht

Population (2006)
  - Total: 201
- Time zone: UTC+3:30 (IRST)
  - Summer (DST): UTC+4:30 (IRDT)

Abad (Persian: آباد, also Romanized as Ābād) is a village in Sardasht Rural District, Zeydun District, Behbahan County, Khuzestan province, Iran. At the 2006 census, its population was 201, in 40 families.
