= Rukaia Al-abadi =

Syrian journalist (born 1988)

- Born: 1988; Syria
- Other names: Ruqaya al-Abadi
- Occupation: Investigative journalist
- Organization: Syrian Female Journalists Network
- Awards: Samir Kassir Award for Freedom of Press (2022)

Rukaia Al-abadi (born 1988) is a Syrian investigative journalist and photojournalist.

== Biography ==
Al-abadi was born in 1988.

Al-abadi began her career in Syria, documenting human rights violations faced by women during the Syrian Civil War. She worked covertly in Deir ez-Zor, an area under the control of ISIS, able to work undercover whilst wearing a niqab and from internet cafes.

In 2014, Al-abadi was arrested and imprisoned for 3 months due to her journalistic work. She continued to work after her release, before fleeing to Turkey in October 2015 when it became too dangerous for her to continue to live and work in Syria. Since 2019, Al-abadi has lived in Paris, France, initially seeking refuge at the Maison des Journalistes.

In 2022, Al-abadi was co-awarded a Samir Kassir Award for Freedom of the Press, for the investigation “The Mahdi Scouts: A chronicle of child recruitment into Iranian militias” which was cowritten with Lebanese journalist Fatima Al-Othman. Her work has also been shortlisted by the Fetisov Journalism Awards and the Climate School and Greenpeace Award for Climate Justice. She works with the Syrian Female Journalists Network as a mentor on the "Empowering a New Generation of Female Journalists" project.
