= Al Ashraf, Mecca =

Al Ashrāf
- Village
- Location in Saudi Arabia
- Coordinates: 21°31′25″N 39°37′0″E
- Country: Saudi Arabia
- Province: Mecca Province
- Time zone: UTC+3 (EAT)
  - Summer (DST): UTC+3 (EAT)

Al Ashrāf is a village in Mecca Province, in western Saudi Arabia.

== See also ==
- List of cities and towns in Saudi Arabia
- Regions of Saudi Arabia
