= Mostafa El-Abbadi =

Egyptian historian (1928–2017)

- مصطفى العبادي
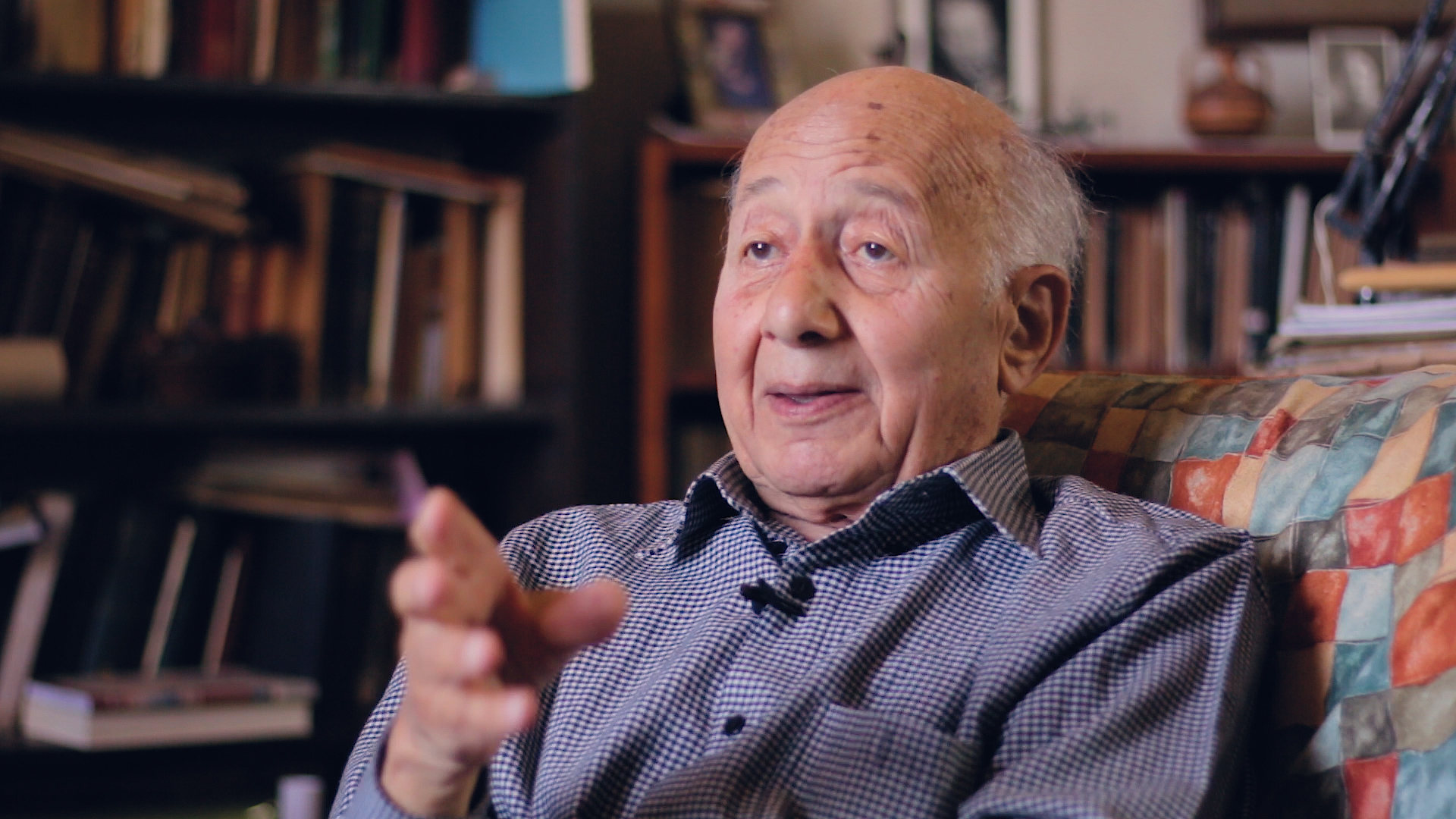
- El-Abbadi in 2016
- Born: Mostafa Abdel-Hamid El-Abbadi; 10 October 1928; Cairo, Egypt
- Died: 13 February 2017 (aged 88); Alexandria, Egypt
- Education: University of Alexandria; Jesus College, Cambridge
- Children: Amr and Mohga
- Scientific career
- Fields: Classics
- Thesis: The Alexandrians: From the Foundation of the City to the Arab Conquest (1960)
- Doctoral advisor: A. H. M. Jones

Mostafa Abdel-Hamid el-Abbadi (Arabic: مصطفى العبادي; 10 October 1928 – 13 February 2017) was a prominent Egyptian historian, public intellectual and professor specialized in Greco-Roman studies. He died on 13 February 2017, at the age of 88, in Alexandria.

== Education ==
El-Abbadi was educated in Egypt and the United Kingdom. He completed his undergraduate BA at Alexandria University. At age 22, he was awarded a scholarship from the Egyptian government to study at the University of Cambridge. He graduated with special BA and PhD in ancient history at Cambridge. He received an honorary doctorate from the Université du Québec à Montréal (UQAM).

== Work ==
After graduation, El-Abbadi became a lecturer and then a professor in Greco-Roman studies at the University of Alexandria. Ismail Serageldin credited him with initially proposing the revival of the ancient library of Alexandria. The project was embraced by UNESCO in 1986, and the Bibliotheca Alexandrina was completed in 2003, but he was not invited to the opening. He was critical of some of aspects of the project as realized by the Egyptian government, telling the New York Times that the library was at risk of becoming "a cultural center" rather than fulfilling its "promise as a world-class research center." He authored the Library of Alexandria entry in the Encyclopædia Britannica.

El-Abbadi was a member of Egypt's Supreme Council of Culture (SCC), Supreme Council of Antiquities (SCA), and l'Institut d'Égypte. He served as president of the Archaeological Society of Alexandria and was an advisor to UNESCO.

== Personal life ==
Mostafa El-Abbadi was married to the literary critic and scholar Azza Kararah, who died in 2015. His father, Abdel-Hamid El-Abbadi, was a historian and founding dean of the Faculty of Arts at the University of Alexandria. He had two children, a son, the computer scientist Amr El Abbadi and a daughter, Dr Mohga El-Abbadi.

== Honours ==
El-Abbadi was a recipient of the Order of the Nile. On 10 October 2022, he was celebrated online with a Google Doodle.

== Selected works ==
- What happened to the ancient Library of Alexandria? Leiden: Brill (2008).
- The Life and Fate of the Ancient Library of Alexandria. Paris: UNESCO (1990, 1992, 1999).
- "The Alexandrian Citizenship," Journal of Egyptian Archaeology (1962).
