= Obata =

Origin
- Language: Japanese

Obata (written: 小畑, 小幡, 小畠 or 小圃) is a Japanese surname. Notable people with the surname include:

- Atsushi Obata (小畑 篤史; born 1973), Japanese rower
- Chiura Obata (小圃 千浦; 1885–1975), Japanese-American artist
- Gyo Obata (1923–2022), American architect
- Hideyoshi Obata (小畑 英良; 1890–1944), general in the Imperial Japanese Army in World War II
- Toshishiro Obata (小幡 利城; born 1948), martial artist, choreographer, actor, and founder of Shinkendo
- Isao Obata (小畑 功; 1904–1976), Japanese karate master
- Kayoko Obata (小幡 佳代子; born 1971), Japanese long-distance runner
- Kunihiko Obata (小幡 邦彦; born 1980), retired amateur Japanese freestyle wrestler
- Obata Kagenori (小幡 景憲; 1572–1663), Confucian scholar and samurai
- Obata Masamori (小幡 昌盛; 1534–1582), Japanese samurai warrior
- Morio Obata (小畠 守生; 1926–2006), Japanese mathematician
- Obata Toramori (小畠 虎盛; 1491–1561), Japanese samurai warrior of the Sengoku Period
- Reiko Obata, Japanese-American koto performer and composer
- Saori Obata (小畑 沙織; born 1978), Japanese tennis player
- Takeshi Obata (小畑 健; born 1969), Japanese manga artist
- Yuma Obata (小畑 裕馬; born 2001), Japanese footballer

Shuichi Obata Born 1932 Japanese designer

== See also ==
- Obata, Mie, a former town in Mie Prefecture, Japan
