= Abad, Kandiaro Taluka =

Village in Sindh Province, Pakistan

Abad
- Village (Union Council)
- Country: Pakistan
- Region: Sindh Province
- District: Naushahro Feroze
- Taluka: Kandiaro
- Union Council: Abad
- Time zone: UTC+5 (PST)

Abad is a village in Kandiaro Taluka of Naushahro Feroze District, in the province of Sindh, Pakistan. It is also the administrative headquarter of the Abad Union Council.
