= Ashrafiyah, Hama =

Ashrafiyah الأشرفية
- Village
- Location in Syria
- Coordinates: 34°49′13.5″N 36°45′24.5″E
- Country: Syria
- Governorate: Hama
- District: Al-Suqaylabiyah District
- Subdistrict: Qalaat al-Madiq

Population (2004)
  - Total: 492
- Time zone: UTC+3 (AST)
- City Qrya Pcode: N/A

Ashrafiyah (Arabic: الأشرفية) is a Syrian village located in Qalaat al-Madiq Subdistrict in Al-Suqaylabiyah District, Hama. According to the Syria Central Bureau of Statistics (CBS), Ashrafiyah had a population of 492 in the 2004 census.
