= Abida Azeem =

Pakistani politician

Senator Abida Muhammad Azeem

Member of the Senate of Pakistan
- Incumbent
- Assumed office 12 March 2018

Personal details
- Party: IPP (2025-present)
- Other party: IND (2018-2025)
- Website: http://www.senate.gov.pk/en/profile.php?uid=915

Abida Muhammad Azeem is a Pakistani politician who has been a Member of the Senate of Pakistan since March 2018.

== Political career ==
Azeem was elected to the Senate of Pakistan as an independent candidate on a reserved seat for women from Balochistan in the 2018 Pakistani Senate election. She took oath as Senator on 12 March 2018.
