= Abad, Azerbaijan =

Abad
- Municipality
- Location within Azerbaijan
- Coordinates: 40°28′10″N 47°20′03″E
- Country: Azerbaijan
- Rayon: Agdash

Population
  - Total: 1,716
- Time zone: UTC+4 (AZT)
  - Summer (DST): UTC+5 (AZT)

Abad is a village and municipality in the Agdash Rayon of Azerbaijan. It has a population of 1,716.
