= Gerdab, Kerman =

Gerdab گرداب
- Village
- Location within Iran
- Coordinates: 28°43′39″N 55°41′54″E
- Country: Iran
- Province: Kerman
- County: Sirjan
- Bakhsh: Central
- Rural District: Golestan

Population (2006)
  - Total: 21
- Time zone: UTC+3:30 (IRST)
  - Summer (DST): UTC+4:30 (IRDT)

Gerdab (Persian: گرداب, also Romanized as Gerdāb; also known as Ābād) is a village in Golestan Rural District, in the Central District of Sirjan County, Kerman Province, Iran. At the 2006 census, its population was 21, in 8 families.
