= ABAD (statutory corporation) =

Public legal entity in Azerbaijan (e. 2016)

ABAD public legal entity
- Founded: September 23, 2016; 9 years ago in Baku, Azerbaijan
- Headquarters: Baku city, Azerbaijan
- Key people: Rufat Elchiyev (director)
- Parent: State Agency for Public Services and Social Innovations under the President of the Republic of Azerbaijan
- Website: abad.gov.az/en

ABAD is a public legal entity to carry out socially oriented projects in Azerbaijan. This agency supports mainly helps family businesses. The acronym “ABAD” stands for "ASAN Support to Family Business" (Azerbaijani: Ailə Biznesinə ASAN Dəstək). ABAD is officially launched its activity under a decree of the president of the Republic of Azerbaijan Ilham Aliyev dated 23 September 2016. The idea actually started from ASAN.

== Aims of Agency ==
Abad is a governmental program for socio-economic development in the rural districts. Primarily, it is designed for family businesses (small and medium enterprises) and raising the employment rate.

Objectives

The main purpose on establishing the organization is the implementation of socially oriented projects aimed at ensuring the active participation of the citizens in the social-economic life of the Republic of Azerbaijan, developing small and medium entrepreneurship, raising the employment rate of the population and supporting the formation of competitive family businesses in the country.

Services provided

Abad is an agency which interacts with business, helping its development at every stage. One of the first projects of the agency is the ceramic center in Shaki.

Services include accounting, design, marketing planning, legal assistance, branding, organizing logistical chain.

Nowadays, UNDP is giving financial support from the EU through ABAD agency. The project has elaborated 44 target families, where 22 of them successfully received financial aid. Overall planned investment is US$1074000.

== Spheres of interactions ==
Mainly, ABAD interacts with decorative and applied folk art such as:

- Carpet weaving
- Copper smiting
- Carved crafts
- Lattice work
- Ceramics
- Pottery
- Vitrage and Painting
- Souvenirs
- Dolls
- Toys
- Jewelry
- Accessories
- Kelaghai
- Millinery
- Decoupage

Also with food production:

- Meat products
- Preserves
- Dairy
- Honey
- Dried fruits
- Drinks
- Vegetable products

== Centres ==
ABAD has three regional centres (in Masally, Balakan, Quba), seven sales centres (five in Baku, one in Qabala and one in Shamakhi), two ceramics centres (in Shaki and Nardaran), and one ABAD School (in Quba).

== International workshop ==
On 20 May, the first international symposium on ceramics was held in Baku at “ABAD” Ceramics and Applied Art Center. Along with Azerbaijan, 25 international ceramists from 14 foreign countries attended the two-week international symposium.
