= Abad-e Eram Posht =

Abad-e Eram Posht ابادارم پشت
- Village
- Location within Iran
- Coordinates: 32°33′53″N 51°54′24″E
- Country: Iran
- Province: Isfahan
- County: Isfahan
- Bakhsh: Central
- Rural District: Baraan-e Shomali

Population (2006)
  - Total: 296
- Time zone: UTC+3:30 (IRST)
  - Summer (DST): UTC+4:30 (IRDT)

Abad-e Eram Posht (Persian: ابادارم پشت, also Romanized as Abād-e Eram Posht; also known as Eram Dasht, Eram Posht, Ḩaram Posht, and Qal‘ehābād) is a village in Baraan-e Shomali Rural District, in the Central District of Isfahan County, Isfahan province, Iran. At the 2006 census, its population was 296, in 62 families.
