= Abad-e Soleyman =

Abad-e Soleyman ابادسليمان
- Village
- Location within Iran
- Coordinates: 32°33′31″N 51°54′42″E
- Country: Iran
- Province: Isfahan
- County: Isfahan
- Bakhsh: Central
- Rural District: Baraan-e Shomali

Population (2006)
  - Total: 112
- Time zone: UTC+3:30 (IRST)
  - Summer (DST): UTC+4:30 (IRDT)

Abad-e Soleyman (Persian: ابادسليمان, also Romanized as Ābād-e Soleymān and Ābād Soleymān; also known as Ābād, Dāmdārī-ye Takāpū, and Soleymānābād) is a village in Baraan-e Shomali Rural District, in the Central District of Isfahan County, Isfahan province, Iran. At the 2006 census, its population was 112, in 24 families.
