= Amr El Abbadi =

Egyptian computer scientist

Amr El-Abbadi
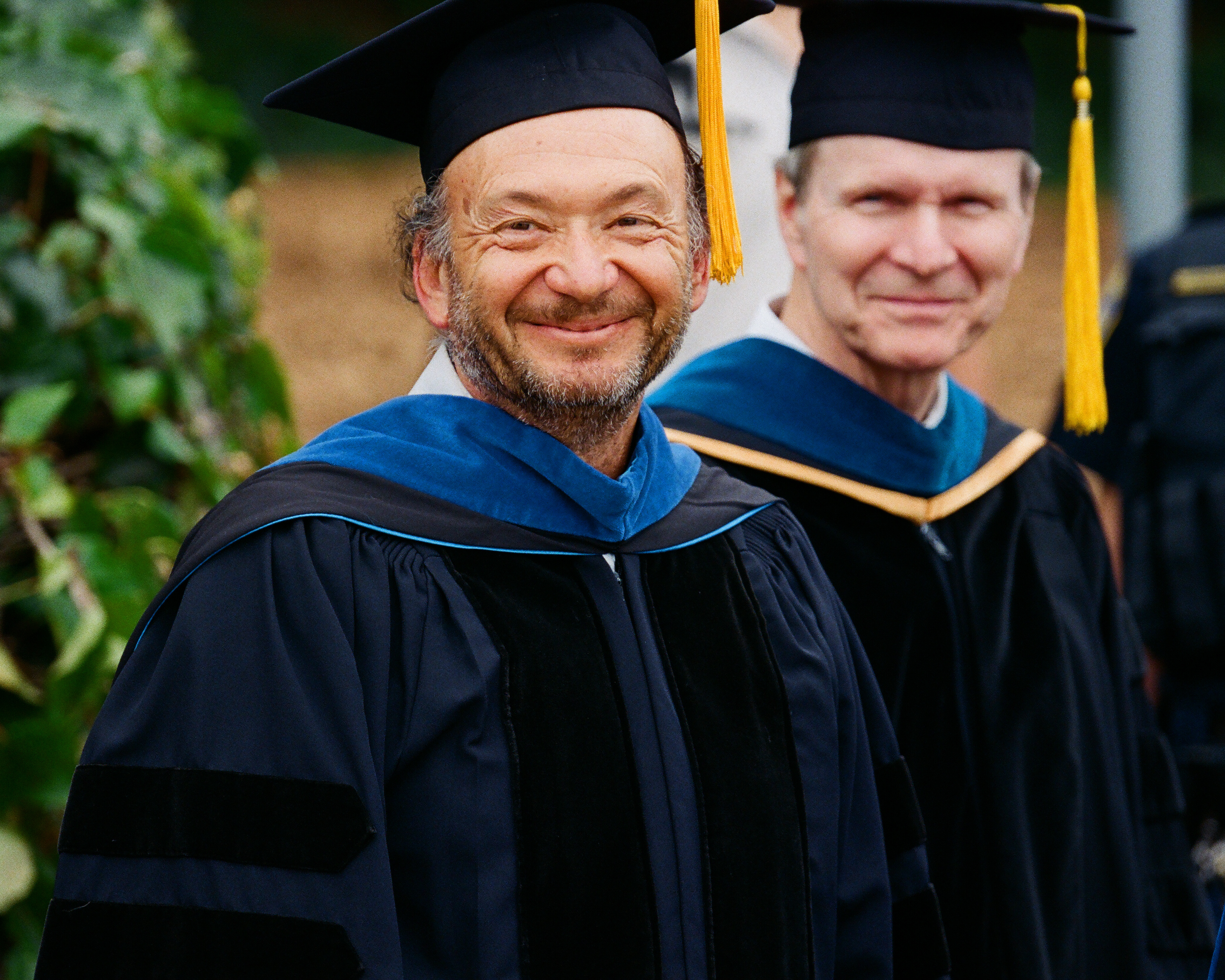
- Amr El-Abbadi in 2019
- Born: 3 November 1958 (age 67); Alexandria, United Arab Republic
- Education: Cornell University, Alexandria University
- Known for: Databases, distributed systems
- Awards: ACM Fellow, NSF CAREER Award
- Scientific career
- Fields: Distributed Systems, Databases
- Workplaces: UCSB, Harold Frank Hall,

Amr El Abbadi is an Egyptian-American computer scientist, and a Distinguished Professor of Computer Science at the University of California, Santa Barbara. He obtained B.Eng. and Ph.D. degrees from Alexandria and Cornell universities, respectively. He is an editor of the VLDB Journal and IEEE Transactions on Computers. He was named Fellow of the Institute of Electrical and Electronics Engineers (IEEE) in 2014 for contributions to the design of fault-tolerant large-scale data management systems.

== Family ==
El Abbadi is the son of the historian Mostafa El Abbadi.
