= Abu Asim al-Abbadi =

Shāfi'ī judge and jurist

Abū ʿĀṣim al-ʿAbbādī (985–1066), called al-Qāḍī al-Harawī, was a Shāfiʿī judge and jurist from Herat.

== Life ==
Abū ʿĀṣim was born into a prominent family of Herat and, according to Ibn al-Samʿānī, could trace his ancestry back to a certain ʿAbbād al-Samʿānī. His full name was Abū ʿĀṣim Muḥammad ibn Aḥmad ibn Muḥammad ibn ʿAbd Allāh ibn ʿAbbād al-ʿAbbādī. He began his studies in fiqh (jurisprudence) in Herat and continued them at Nishapur under ʿAbd al-Ghāfir al-Fārisī, Abū al-Ṭayyib al-Ṣuʿlūkī and Abū Isḥāq al-Isfarāyinī.

According to the biographical dictionary of Tāj al-Dīn al-Subkī, al-ʿAbbādī belonged to the fourth generation of Shāfiʿīs. He travelled widely to learn and transmit ḥadīth (tradition). Upon his return to Herat, he was appointed qāḍī (judge), in which position he served until his death. He died in September 1066. He left a son, Abu l-Ḥasan, who wrote a Kitāb al-Raḳm.

== Works ==
Al-ʿAbbādī wrote mainly on fiqh, but he also composed the first ṭabaqāt (biographical dictionary) devoted to a school of fiqh, in his case, the Shāfiʿīs. This book, Ṭabaqāt al-fuqahāʾ al-Shāfiʿiyya, is his only work to be independently preserved. It survives in several manuscripts. In addition, his Adab al-qaḍāʾ on the adab (etiquette) of judges, has survived in al-Ishrāf ʿalā Ghawāmiḍ al-Ḥukūmāt, a commentary written by his student, Abū Saʿd ibn Abī Aḥmad ibn Abī Yūsuf al-Harawī (died c. 1107). The titles of other known works on judgeship include al-Aṭʿima and Aḥkām al-miyāh.

In al-ʿAbbādī's lifetime, both Shāfiʿīs and Ḥanafīs were respected and influential in Greater Khurāsān and both received judgeships. Much of his work, therefore, was directed against the Ḥanafīs. According to Ḥājjī Khalīfa, he wrote a thirty-volume compendium entitled al-Mabsūṭ. The titles of several other works are known: Ziyādāt, Ziyādāt al-ziyādāt, Radd ʿalā al-Qāḍī al-Samʿānī and al-Hādī ilā madhāhib al-ʿulamāʾ. All of these concerened the differences between the two schools of fiqh and the superiority of the Shāfiʿīs.

Al-ʿAbbādī gained a reputation in his own time for his difficult style, which may explain the poor survival rate of his writings.

== Bibliography ==
- Ephrat, Daphna (2014). "al-ʿAbbādī". In Fleet, Kate; Krämer, Gudrun; Matringe, Denis; Nawas, John; Rowson, Everett (eds.). Encyclopaedia of Islam (3rd ed.). Brill Online. doi:10.1163/1573-3912_ei3_COM_24636. ISSN 1873-9830.
- Haj Manouchehri, Faramarz (2015). "Al-ʿAbbādī, Abū ʿĀṣim". In Farhad Daftary (ed.). Encyclopaedia Islamica. Translated by Rahim Gholami. Brill. doi:10.1163/1875-9831_isla_SIM_0008.
- Schacht, Joseph (1960). "al-ʿAbbādī". In Gibb, H. A. R.; Kramers, J. H.; Lévi-Provençal, E.; Schacht, J.; Lewis, B. & Pellat, Ch. (eds.). The Encyclopaedia of Islam, Second Edition. Volume I: A–B. Leiden: E. J. Brill. p. 5. doi:10.1163/1573-3912_islam_SIM_0014. OCLC 495469456.
