= Muqadamma Ashrafi =

Tajikistani medievalist and art historian (1936–2013)

- Born: July 5, 1936; Tashkent, Uzbek SSR, Soviet Union
- Died: June 29, 2013 (aged 77)
- Parent: Mukhtar Ashrafi

Academic background
- Education: Moscow State University (MA, cand.)

Academic work
- Discipline: Art historian
- Sub-discipline: Central Asian art
- Institutions: Tajik Academy of Sciences; Technological University of Tajikistan

Muqaddama Ashrafi (Tajik: Муқаддима Ашрафӣ; July 5, 1936 – June 29, 2013) was a Tajik medievalist and art historian.

== Biography ==
Ashrafi was born in Tashkent, Uzbek SSR into an ethnic Tajik family. Her father was the noted composer Mukhtar Ashrafi. She graduated from the Taskhent Musical School in 1954; in 1959 she received a degree in art history from the Moscow State University. From that year until 1961 she worked in the Oriental Studies Department of the USSR Academy of Sciences in Moscow; beginning in 1962 she was a postgraduate student at that institution's Institute of Oriental Studies, graduating in 1968. From 1969 until 1971 she was employed at the Tajik Academy of Sciences in the Department of Philosophy. She earned a Candidate of Art History (equivalent to a PhD) in 1972. The same year, she moved to the Tajik Academy of Sciences Institute of History, and became chair of the humanities department at the Tajik Technological University. In 1986, Ashrafi earned a Doctor of Arts degree (similar to a habilitation). As a scholar, Ashrafi specialized in the medieval arts—especially painting—of Central Asia. She was married to the writer Kamol Ayni. At the time of her death she was at work on the last volume of a planned trilogy on the subject of Tajik miniature painting, having already published the first two volumes in 2011.
