= Abida (biblical figure) =

Son of Midian in the Bible

According to Genesis 25:4, Abida (Hebrew: אֲבִידָע ʾĂḇīḏāʿ) was the son of Midian, and the grandson of Abraham and his wife Keturah. He had four brothers: Ephah, Epher, Hanoch and Eldaah.

According to Easton's Bible Dictionary, Abida means "father of knowledge" or "knowing." The name appears only in Genesis 25:4 and 1 Chronicles 1:33. On the basis of his derivation from Midian, Easton infers that he was the ancestor of an Arab tribe.
