= Arab al-'Arida =

Arab al-'Arida عرب العريضه Arab al-Areeda
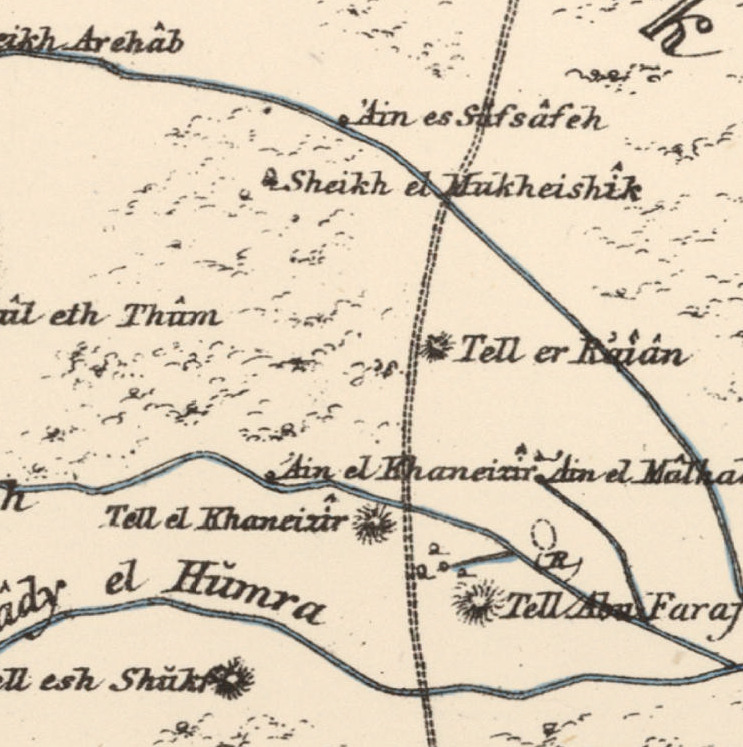
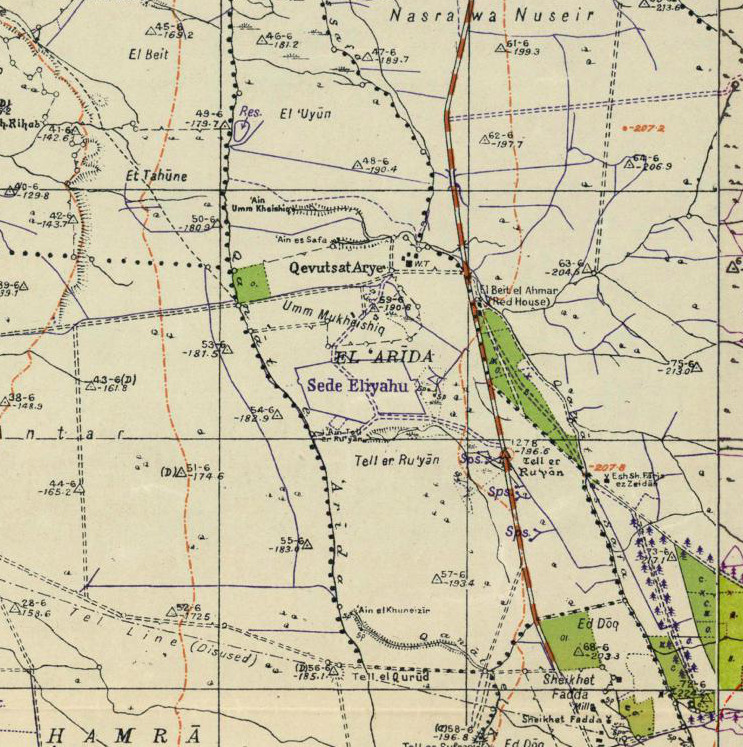
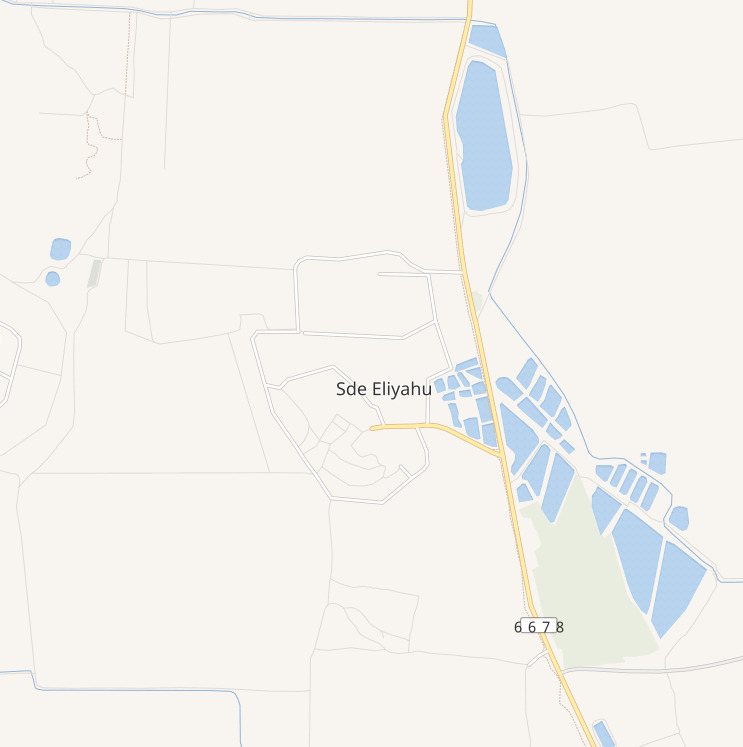
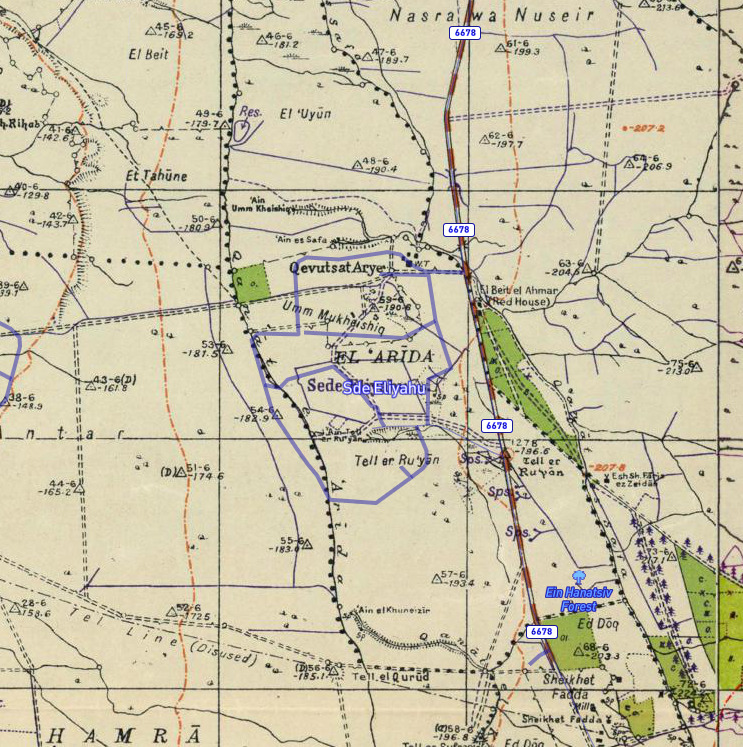
- 1870s map 1940s map modern map 1940s with modern overlay map A series of historical maps of the area around Arab al-'Arida (click the buttons)

- Location within Mandatory Palestine
- Coordinates: 32°26′28″N 35°30′52″E
- Palestine grid: 198/205
- Geopolitical entity: Mandatory Palestine
- Subdistrict: Baysan
- Date of depopulation: May 20, 1948

Area
  - Total: 700 dunams (70 ha; 170 acres)

Population (1945)
  - Total: 150
- Cause(s) of depopulation: Influence of nearby town's fall
- Current Localities: Sde Eliyahu

Arab al-'Arida (Arabic: عرب العريضه), is a depopulated former Palestinian Arab village and 6 kilometers (3.7 mi) south of the city of Beit She'an.

== History ==
Arab al-'Arida stood on the Tell al-Ru'yan and Tell al-Qurud sites.

=== British Mandate ===
In the 1931 census it had a population of 182, all Muslims, in a total of 38 houses.

In the 1945 statistics it had a population of 150 Muslims and held 700 dunams of land. In 1944/45 a total of 600 dunums of village land was used for cereals, while 100 dunams were classed as uncultivable.

=== Israel ===
Arab al-'Arida was captured by Israel's Golani Brigade during Operation Gideon on May 20, 1948. Following the war the area was incorporated into the State of Israel. The Palestinian historian Walid Khalidi, described the village remains in 1992: "No traces are left of the village. The whole village site is planted in wheat. The archaeological site, Tall al-Ru'yan, has been transformed into a garbage dump."

== See also ==
- Depopulated Palestinian locations in Israel

== Bibliography ==
- Government of Palestine, Department of Statistics (1945). Village Statistics, April, 1945.
- Hadawi, S. (1970). Village Statistics of 1945: A Classification of Land and Area ownership in Palestine. Palestine Liberation Organization Research Center.
- Khalidi, W. (1992). All That Remains:The Palestinian Villages Occupied and Depopulated by Israel in 1948. Washington D.C.: Institute for Palestine Studies. ISBN 0-88728-224-5.
- Mills, E., ed. (1932). Census of Palestine 1931. Population of Villages, Towns and Administrative Areas. Jerusalem: Government of Palestine.
- Morris, B. (2004). The Birth of the Palestinian Refugee Problem Revisited. Cambridge University Press. ISBN 978-0-521-00967-6.
