= Khanazir =

Khanazir خنازير Ashrafiyah
- Village
- Location in Syria
- Coordinates: 34°52′23″N 36°23′38″E
- Country: Syria
- Governorate: Hama
- District: Masyaf
- Subdistrict: Awj

Population (2004)
  - Total: 397
- Time zone: UTC+3 (AST)
- City Qrya Pcode: C3394

Khanazir (Arabic: الأشرفية خنازير, also known as Ashrafiyah) is a Syrian village located in Awj Nahiyah in Masyaf District, Hama. According to the Syria Central Bureau of Statistics (CBS), Khanazir had a population of 397 in the 2004 census. Its inhabitants are predominantly Alawites.

== Bibliography ==
- Robinson, E.; Smith, E. (1841). Biblical Researches in Palestine, Mount Sinai and Arabia Petraea: A Journal of Travels in the year 1838. Vol. 3. Boston: Crocker & Brewster.
