= Hani Abbadi =

Jordanian politician

Hani Masalha Abbadi (died 13 August 2014) was a Jordanian politician who served in the 12th House of Representatives. After his death, House of Representatives Speaker Atef Tarawneh paid tribute to Abbadi.
