= Moussa Abadi =

WWII member of the French Resistance (1910–1997)

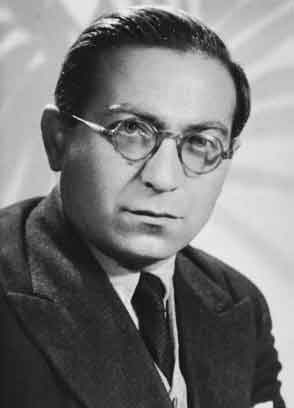
Moussa Abadi

Moussa Abadi (1910–1997) was a member of the French Resistance in southern France during World War II. With Odette Rosenstock, they saved 527 children from being taken by the Nazis and the Schutzstaffel (SS) forces.

== Early life and education ==
Moussa Abadi was born in Damascus, Syria in 1910. He attended the Jewish Alliance School in Damascus, where he learned to speak French and received a scholarship to study in France. He attended the Sorbonne, where he developed an interest in the theatre and was a member of the theatrical troupe Compagnie des Quatre Saisons.

== World War II ==
=== Background ===
After Nazis invaded France, the Vichy government instituted laws that attacked the rights of Jewish people, which became increasingly intense by 1942. As the government captured children, the Jewish community looked for ways to protect the children.

=== Resistance movement ===
In 1939, Abadi met Odette Rosenstock, who served as a physician during the Spanish Civil War (1936–1939). She worked as a physician until Vichy laws did not allow her to be employed, then she worked as a midwife. In 1942, Abadi asked Rosenstock to join him in Nice. They joined the French Resistance movement there, where they were ignored by the Italian forces and not yet subject to German invasion. In Nice, they helped Jewish families take refuge. Odette took the undercover name Sylvie Delatre.

In 1943, the Germans, along with a special Schutzstaffel (SS) force and SS Captain Alois Brunner, invaded southern France and began capturing Jews. To find Jewish people, the Germans were especially ruthless and they used bribery and torture to gain information.

=== Protection of children ===
Afraid for the fate of their children, Jewish parents brought their children to Abadi and Rosenstock for their protection. Paul Rémond, the Bishop of Nice, provided them a room in his residence for safekeeping. Rémond asked Catholic schools to harbor children. Hiding places were found for 527 children who were saved by their organization, Réseau Marcel (Marcel network). The United States Holocaust Memorial Museum states that "The Réseau Marcel was one of the most successful Jewish rescue networks in Vichy France."

In 1944, Rosenstock was found out and sent to Auschwitz-Birkenau and then to the Bergen-Belsen concentration camp. She cared for the people who were too ill to be sent to the death chambers.

== Post-war ==
At the end of the war, Rosenstock was released and she returned to Paris. Abadi met up with her and they were married, with Rosenstock becoming Odette Abadi. She continued her work as a physician.

Moussa and Odette were identified as the individuals who worked to save more than 500 children, but like other Jewish rescuers were not named with the Christian rescuers, like the Bishop of Nice who helped them and was honored in 1992 by the United States Holocaust Memorial Museum. In 1995, driven by horrendous wars that resulted in the extermination of people, she wrote a book Terre de détresse Birkenau-Bergen-Belsen about her experiences in the concentration camps during the Second World War.

Moussa died in 1997.
