= Al-Ashrafiyya =

Al-Ashrafiyya الأشرفية Ashrafiya
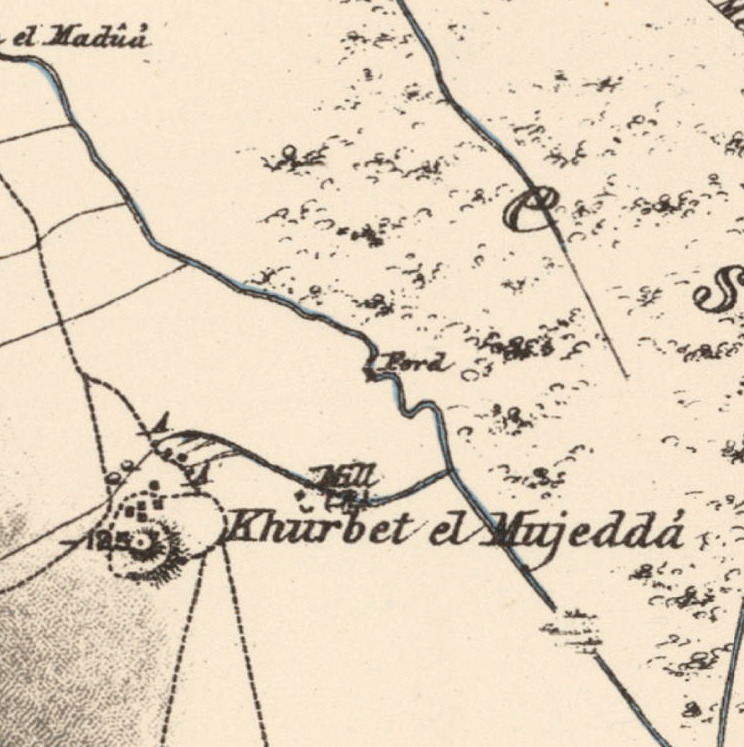
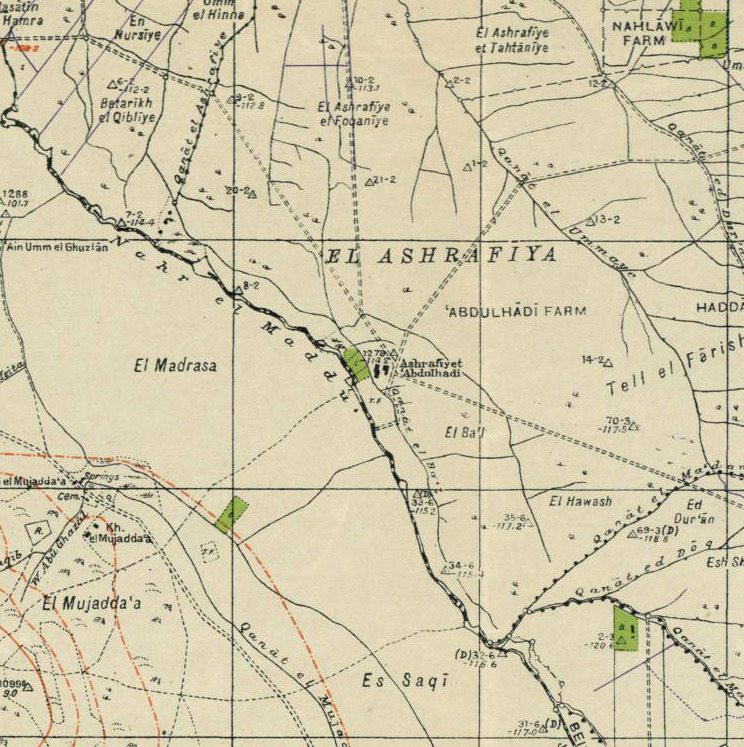
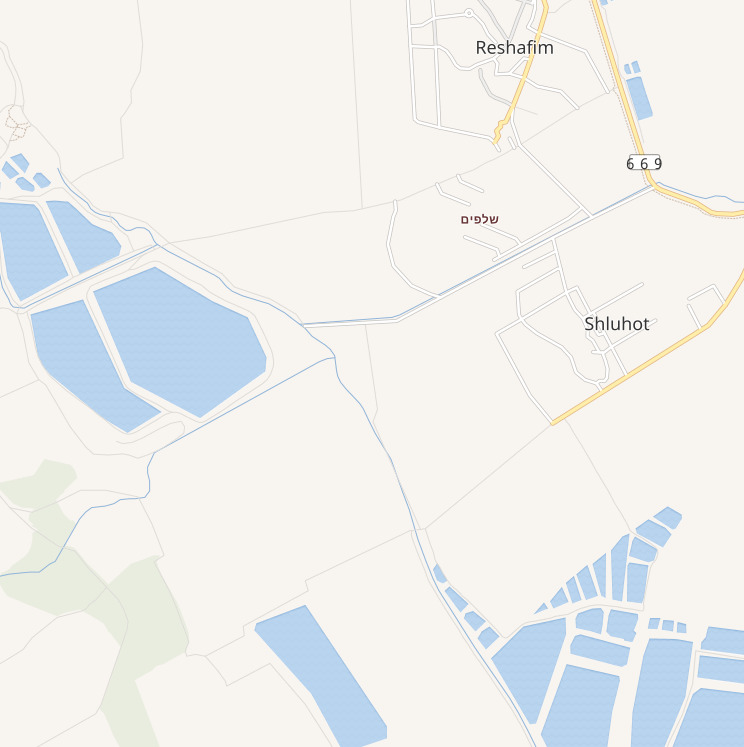
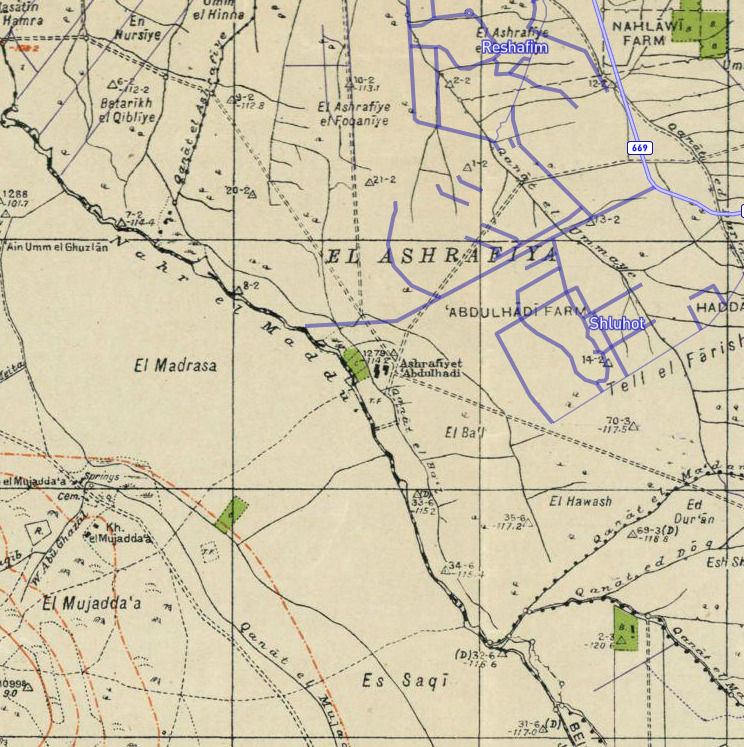
- 1870s map 1940s map modern map 1940s with modern overlay map A series of historical maps of the area around Al-Ashrafiyya (click the buttons)

- Location within Mandatory Palestine
- Coordinates: 32°28′12″N 35°28′17″E
- Palestine grid: 194/208
- Geopolitical entity: Mandatory Palestine
- Subdistrict: Baysan
- Date of depopulation: May 12, 1948

Area
  - Total: 6,711 dunams (6.711 km^{2}; 2.591 sq mi)

Population (1945)
  - Total: 230
- Cause(s) of depopulation: Influence of nearby town's fall
- Current Localities: Sheluhot, Reshafim

Al-Ashrafiyya (Arabic: الأشرفية), was a Palestinian Arab village in the District of Baysan. It was depopulated during the 1947–1948 Civil War in Mandatory Palestine. It was located 4.5 km southwest of Baysan.

The village was depopulated on May 12, 1948, during Operation Gideon. The village was completely destroyed and the inhabitants fled to Jordan.

== History ==
Just east of the village site, (at 196/208) pottery remains from the Byzantine era have been found, together with coins dating to the time of Justinian I (527–565 C.E.).

=== British Mandate era ===
In the 1922 census of Palestine, conducted by the Mandatory Palestine authorities, Ashrafiyet Kuzma had 29 inhabitant; 27 Muslims and 2 Christians, while Ashrafiyet Rushdi had 7 Muslims; a total of 36 inhabitants. The 2 Christians were Roman Catholics.

In the 1931 census there were 4 villages named Ashrafiyat, where Ashrafiyat Kazma had 123 Muslims and 2 Christians in a total of 34 houses, while the three others were all Muslims; 48 in 11 houses in Ashrafiyat Abd el Hadi, 10 in 3 houses in Ashrafiyat Haddad, and 36 in 10 houses in Ashrafiyat Zamriq. In total there were 219 inhabitants in a total of 58 houses.

In the 1945 statistics, the population consisted of 230 Muslims, and the land area was 6711 dunams, according to an official land and population survey. Of this, the land ownership census the Land Ownership (Dunums) was as follows:

Owner	Dunams
Arab	4,608
Jewish	1,293
Public	810
Total	6,711

The use of village land in 1945:

Land Usage	Arab	Jewish	Public
Citrus and bananas	143	11	-
Irrigated and plantation	4,458	772	-
Cereal	7	510	583
Urban	-	-	-
Cultivable	4,608	1,293	583
Non-cultivable	-	-	227

The population rose to 267 in 1948 with 61 houses. The Wadi al-Maddu' runs near where the village was located.

=== 1948, aftermath ===
In March, 1948, Yosef Weitz had started pressing the Haganah to expel Arab tenant farmers, and kibbutz leaders in the Baysan valley had demanded new settlements in their area, as "a means of freeing our land [from Arabs] and preventing the return of the beduins who had fled to Transjordan". On 22 April, 1948, Haganah agreed to set up five new settlements on non-Arab land, including land in Al-Ashrafiyya.

The Palestinian inhabitants of Al-Ashrafiyya, along with those of the neighbouring village of Farwana, fled to Jordan with the approach of the pre-state Israeli forces of the Golani Brigade during Operation Gideon on 11 May 1948.

Following the war the area was incorporated into the State of Israel and two kibbutzim were established on village land in 1948, Shluhot and Reshafim, both east of the village site.

In 1992, it was described: "The site and the area around it are cultivated by the residents of Reshafim. A fishery also has been built on the site."

== See also ==
- Farwana

== Bibliography ==
- Barron, J. B., ed. (1923). Palestine: Report and General Abstracts of the Census of 1922. Government of Palestine.
- Dauphin, C. (1998). La Palestine byzantine, Peuplement et Populations. BAR International Series 726 (in French). Vol. III : Catalogue. Oxford: Archeopress. ISBN 0-860549-05-4.
- Government of Palestine, Department of Statistics (1945). Village Statistics, April, 1945.
- Hadawi, S. (1970). Village Statistics of 1945: A Classification of Land and Area ownership in Palestine. Palestine Liberation Organization Research Center. Archived from the original on 2018-12-08.
- Khalidi, W. (1992). All That Remains:The Palestinian Villages Occupied and Depopulated by Israel in 1948. Washington D.C.: Institute for Palestine Studies. ISBN 0-88728-224-5.
- Mills, E., ed. (1932). Census of Palestine 1931. Population of Villages, Towns and Administrative Areas. Jerusalem: Government of Palestine.
- Morris, B. (2004). The Birth of the Palestinian Refugee Problem Revisited. Cambridge University Press. ISBN 978-0-521-00967-6.
