= Abid =

- Pronunciation: Arabic: [ʕaːbɪd]
- Gender: Male
- Language: Arabic

Origin
- Meaning: "worshipper"

Abid or Abed is a masculine given name and surname of Arabic origin meaning worshipper, adorer, or devout. In the Russian language, "Аби́д" (Abid), or its form "Ави́д" (Avid), is an old and uncommon masculine given name. Included into various, often handwritten, church calendars throughout the 17th–19th centuries, it was omitted from the official Synodal Menologium at the end of the 19th century. Notable people with the name include:

== Given name ==
=== Abed ===
- Abed Abdi (born 1942), Palestinian painter, graphic designer, sculptor, and art lecturer
- Abed Abest (born 1987), Iranian director, writer, and actor
- Abed Azrie (born 1945), French-Syrian singer and composer
- Abed Bwanika (born 1967), Ugandan veterinarian, politician, and pastor
- Abed Chagar (born 1968), Moroccan business leader
- Abed Daoudieh (1920–2015), Jordanian politician
- Abed Hishoono (born 1974), Namibian politician
- Abed Jabarin (born 1998), Israeli footballer
- Abed Rahman Kaaki (born 1986), Lebanese swimmer
- Abed Khan (born 1945), Bangladeshi journalist and columnist
- Abed Hossain Khan (1929–1996), Bangladeshi musician, music composer, and music director
- Abed Mahfouz (born 1956), Lebanese fashion designer
- Abed Rabah (born 1975), Israeli footballer
- Abed Saleem (born 1995), Iraqi footballer
- Abed Yassin (born 2004), Palestinian footballer
- Abed Elrahim Abu Zakrra (1943–1989), Sudanese writer, poet, and translator

=== Abid ===
- Abid Ali, multiple people
- Abid Sher Ali (born 1971), Pakistani politician
- Abid Hussain Ansari (born 1946), Indian politician and businessman
- Abid Anwar (actor) (born 1986), Indian actor, model, and singer
- Abid Anwar (poet), Bangladeshi poet, critic, and lyricist
- Abid Azad (1952–2005), Bangladeshi poet, critic, and literary editor
- Abid Raza Bedar (1936–2025), Indian writer, librarian, and scholar
- Abid Hussain Bhayo, Pakistani politician
- Abid Briki (born 1957), Tunisian trade unionist and politician
- Abidur Reza Chowdhury (1872–1961), Bengali politician and educationist
- Abid Ghoffar Aboe Dja'far (born 1954), Indonesian singer and songwriter
- Abid Hussain Ghazi (1934–2016), Pakistani footballer
- Abid Hasan (1911–1984), Indian Army officer and diplomat
- Abid Hasan (diplomat) (1911–1984), Indian Army officer
- Abid Hussain (1926–2012), Indian economist and diplomat
- Abid Mutlak al-Jubouri (1940–2026), Iraqi politician
- Abid Kadhim (1942–2005), Iraqi footballer
- Abid Kashmiri (1950–2024), Pakistani actor and comedian
- Abid Khan (actor) (1953–2000), Pakistani comedian and actor.
- Abid Raza Khan (born 1972), Indian politician
- Abid Kovačević (born 1952), Bosnian footballer
- Abid Lashari, Pakistani disability rights activist and social worker
- Abid Mahmood (born 1977), Pakistani cricketer
- Abid Hamid Mahmud (1957–2012), Iraqi Army officer
- Abid Merchant, Pakistani film producer and arts administrator
- Abid Hassan Minto (born 1932), Pakistani lawyer
- Abid Mohammadi (born 2002), Afghan cricketer
- Abid Mujagić (born 1993), Bosnian footballer
- Abid Mushtaq (born 1997), Indian cricketer
- Abid Nabi (born 1985), Indian first class cricketer
- Abid Riaz Qureshi, Pakistani-American attorney
- Abid Raja (born 1975), Pakistani-Norwegian politician
- Abid Sharifov (born 1940), Azerbaijani politician
- Abid Aziz Sheikh (born 1967), Pakistani judge
- Abid Qaiyum Suleri (born 1969), Pakistani social policy analyst and development practitioner
- Abid Surti (born 1935), Indian painter, author, cartoonist, journalist, environmentalist, playwright, and screenwriter

== Surname ==
=== Abed ===
- Fazle Hasan Abed (1936–2019), British-Bangladeshi social worker
- Nawaf Al Abed (born 1990), Saudi footballer
- Pépé Abed, (1911–2006), Lebanese adventurer, explorer, and entrepreneur
- Ramzi Abed (born 1973), American film director
- Shireen Abed, Palestinian pediatrician and neonatal specialist

=== Abid ===
- Ahmad Izzat Pasha al-Abid (1855–1924), Syrian-Ottoman counselor
- Hawlu Pasha al-Abid (1824–1895), Syrian-Ottoman administrator
- Kalbe Abid (died 1986), Indian mujtahid
- Laïla Abid (born 1977), Moroccan-Dutch journalist
- Muhammad Ali Bay al-Abid (1867–1939), Syrian politician
- Qazi Abdul Majeed Abid (1915–1996), Pakistani politician and journalist
- Ramzi Abid (born 1980), Canadian ice hockey player
- Zara Abid (1992–2020), Pakistani model

== See also ==
- Abidi
- Abdi
- Ebed, the cognate name in Hebrew
