= Tanvir Sadiq =

Indian politician and writer

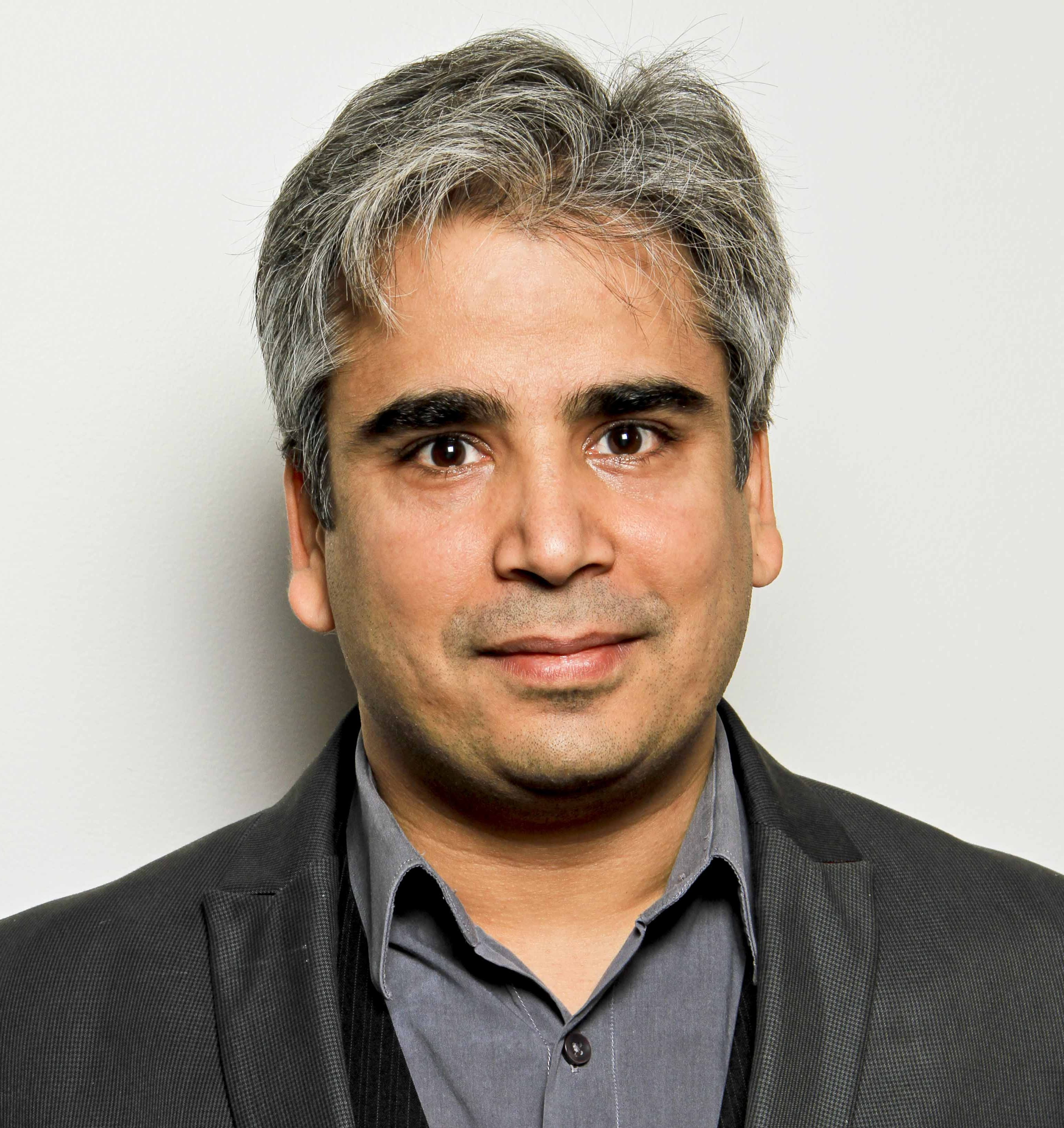

Member Jammu and Kashmir Legislative Assembly
- Incumbent
- Assumed office 8 October 2024
- Constituency: Zadibal

Personal details
- Born: 7 January Hassanabad, Srinagar, Kashmir, India
- Party: J&K National Conference
- Parents: Sadiq Ali (father); Anisa Ali (mother)
- Occupation: Chief Spokesperson JKNC & Political advisor

Tanvir Sadiq is the Member of the Legislative Assembly from the Zadibal constituency in Srinagar, representing the Jammu and Kashmir National Conference. He secured this seat with the highest victory margin in Srinagar, emerging as the top vote-getter in the district. In addition to his legislative role, he serves as the Chief Spokesperson of the Jammu and Kashmir National Conference and Advisor to the Chief Minister of Jammu and Kashmir. Omar Abdullah. He was previously a Srinagar City Corporator.

Born in Srinagar into a political family, he did his schooling from Burn Hall School, Srinagar, and Tyndale Biscoe Memorial. Afterward, he earned a bachelor's degree in Information Technology and Management.

He commenced his political career as an elected corporator (City council member). He then became the Spokesperson of the Jammu & Kashmir National Conference party. This was followed by a stint as political secretary to the former Chief Minister of Jammu and Kashmir Omar Abdullah. He was nominated as the Chief Spokesperson of Jammu and National conference party.

== Political career ==
He won Assembly Elections in General Elections 2024 and currently is a MLA from Zadibal Constituency.

He was the Head of the National Conference Cyber Cell, was elected as a corporator (member of city council) of the Srinagar Municipal Corporation, was re-elected as the Leader of the Opposition and was a mayoral candidate twice but never won. Sadiq worked as a member of two prestigious committees of the corporation and represented the corporation at various seminars.

Tanvir was the political advisor to former Chief Minister of Jammu and Kashmir.

== Achievements and present stand ==
He has been a columnist for India's largest newspapers India Today "Apply the same yard stick" Mail Today "Does India need a Hero". He also writes for the Gulf News and the Hindu.

Sadiq has survived attacks by terrorists. Tanvir has in past contested election as an independent candidate.

=== Excerpts ===
1. A sub-continental conference of the Indo-Pak youth both in Srinagar and Muzaffarabad.
2. Persuade both India and Pakistan for greater student exchange between the two countries.
3. Environmental awareness. Both in two parts of the state and devising a solution that can safeguard the environment.
4. Considering the substantial damage that the state has suffered from various natural calamities, formulate a comprehensive disaster management policy with total involvement of the youth on both sides.
