= Imran Reza Ansari =

Indian politician, businessman and religious scholar

Molvi Imran Reza Ansari
- مولانامولوى عمران رضا انصاری

Minister of State, Jammu and Kashmir
- Constituency: Pattan, Baramulla, Kashmir

Personal details
- Born: 7 March 1972 (age 54) Srinagar, Jammu and Kashmir
- Party: Jammu and Kashmir People's Conference
- Other political affiliations: President, All Jammu and Kashmir Shia Association, Chairman Imam Hussain A.S Charitable Trust; President, Maarif-Uloom-Islami [Educational wing of All Jammu and Kashmir Shia Association ].; Jammu and Kashmir People’s Democratic Party
- Children: Mohammad Jawad Ansari (son)
- Education: Tyndale Biscoe School, SP School, Jamia Millia Islamia, Al-Mustafa International University, Qom Hawza, Damascus University, Hawza of Syria,
- Occupation: Politician,Businessman,Religious Cleric

Imran Reza Ansari (born 7 March 1972) is an Indian politician, businessman and Islamic scholar from Jammu and Kashmir. He served as a minister in the Government of Jammu and Kashmir and represented the Pattan constituency in the Jammu and Kashmir Legislative Assembly.

Ansari belongs to the prominent Ansari family of Kashmiri Shia scholars and politicians. The Ansari family had migrated to Kahsmir during the reign of Sultan Zainulabidin c. 1418 CE, from Iran. The family traces its roots to the Ansar of Madina who belonged to the Banu Khazraj Clan. He is the son of former minister Iftikhar Hussain Ansari, nephew of former legislator Abid Hussain Ansari, and grandson of Molvi Jawad Ansari, founder of the All Jammu and Kashmir Shia Association. Ansari is one of the most prominent Shia scholars as well as polticial leaders in J&K.

He entered active politics following the death of his father and was elected to the Jammu and Kashmir Legislative Assembly in the 2014 Jammu and Kashmir Assembly election on the ticket of the Jammu & Kashmir Peoples Democratic Party. During the PDP–BJP coalition government headed by Chief Minister Mehbooba Mufti, Ansari served as Minister of State with independent charge for Information Technology, Technical Education, Youth Services and Sports.

In 2018, following political differences with the PDP leadership, Ansari joined the Jammu and Kashmir People's Conference. Apart from politics, he has remained associated with religious, educational and charitable organisations in Kashmir, including the All Jammu and Kashmir Shia Association and Imam Hussain A.S. Charitable Trust.

== Early life and education ==
Imran Reza Ansari was born on 7 March 1972 in Srinagar, Jammu and Kashmir, into the influential Ansari family of Kashmiri Shia scholars and politicians. His father, Iftikhar Hussain Ansari, was a senior political leader and minister in Jammu and Kashmir, while his grandfather Molvi Jawad Ansari founded the All Jammu and Kashmir Shia Association.

Ansari received his early education at Tyndale Biscoe School and S.P. School in Srinagar. He later attended Jamia Millia Islamia, New Delhi, where he pursued higher studies in arts and political science.

Following his university education, Ansari pursued advanced Islamic and theological studies in Syria, Iran and Lebanon. He studied Arabic language and Islamic theology at institutions including the University of Damascus, Hawza Zainabiyya in Damascus, and seminaries in Qom, Iran. He later attended Al-Mustafa International University, where he continued studies in Islamic philosophy, jurisprudence and theology.

Ansari is associated with several religious, educational and charitable organisations in Jammu and Kashmir, including the All Jammu and Kashmir Shia Association (which he heads, as its lifelong president) and Maarif-Uloom-Islami (the Educational Wing of the AJKSA) . Following the death of his father, he also succeeded him as the representative (wakil) of Iraqi Shia cleric Ayatollah Ali al-Sistani in Kashmir and additionally is also the representative (wakil) of Iranian Shia cleric Ayatollah Naser Makarem Shirazi."I am Mulla, I am an Aalim, I am a Religious Theologian". Kashmir Life.

== Political career ==
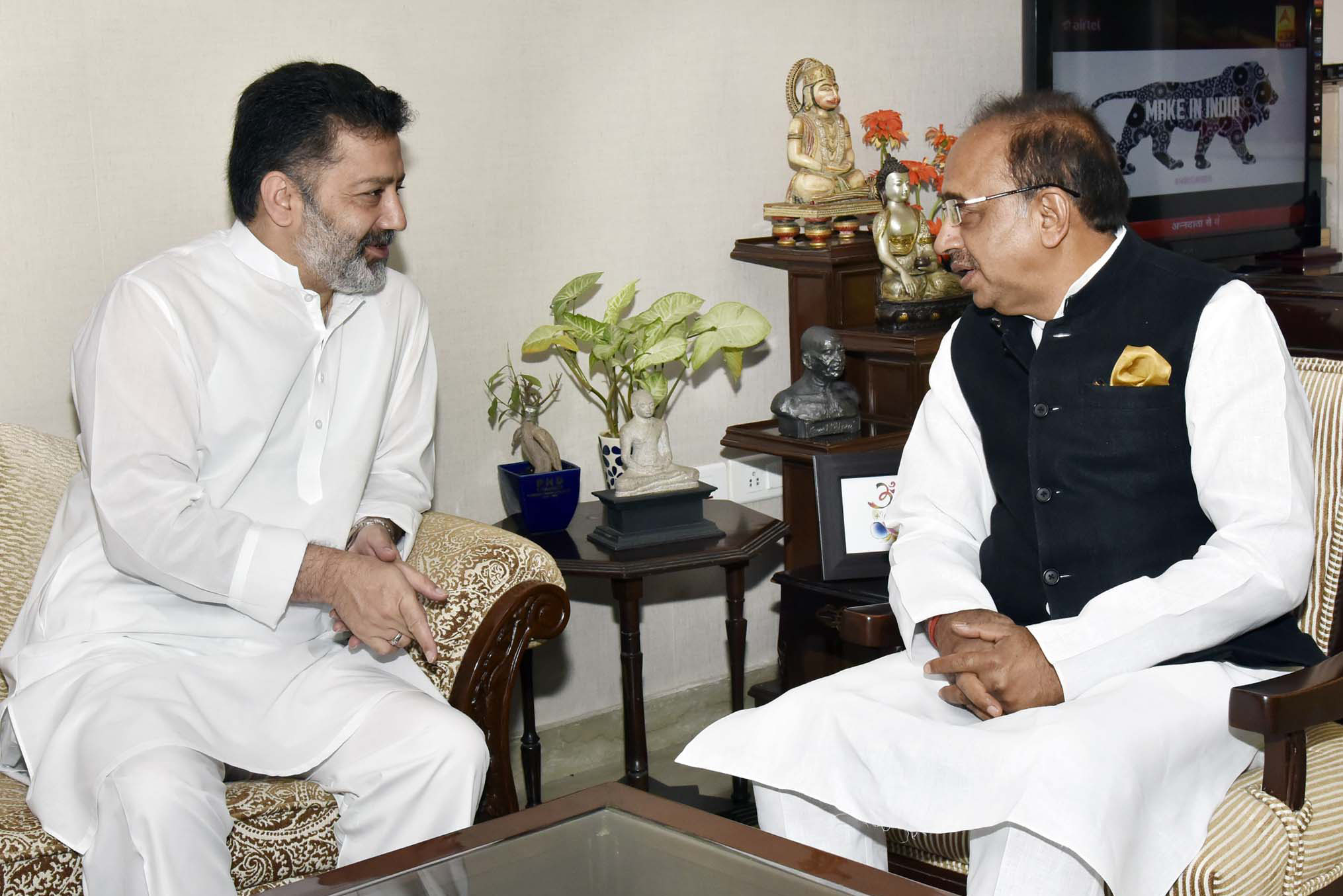
Imran Reza Ansari with Vijay Goel in 2017.

After death of his father Iftikhar Hussain Ansari in 2014, Imran Reza Ansari was fielded by Jammu and Kashmir People's Democratic Party at the Pattan constituency where his father served before. In 2014 Jammu and Kashmir Legislative Assembly election, Imran Reza Ansari won from his constituency with more than 14000+ votes. After new government was formed by Jammu and Kashmir Peoples Democratic Party, Imran Ansari was declared minister of Information Technology, Technical Education, Youth Service and Sports. He has also served as the president of Jammu and Kashmir Cricket Association. Ansari ended the three decade long term of Farooq Abdullah, when he was newly elected as president of Jammu and Kashmir Cricket Association on 16 July 2016.

== See also ==
- Iftikhar Hussain Ansari
- Irfan Reza Ansari
- Abid Hussain Ansari
- Mufti Mohammad Sayeed
- Sajjad Gani Lone
