= Abidi =

Abidi, Abedi or Al-Abedi (Arabic: عابدي) is a surname derived from the personal name Abid or Abed.

Notable people with the surname include:

- Agha Hasan Abedi (1922–1995), Pakistani banker and founder of BCCI
- Amir Abedi (1924–1964), Mayor of Dar es Salaam
- Asad Abidi (born 1956), Pakistani electrical engineer
- Azhar Abidi (born 1968), Pakistani-Australian author and translator
- Colet Abedi, Iranian-American writer and producer
- Intezar Abidi (born 1976), alias Bobby, Indian politician and former member of the Uttar Pradesh state government
- Hasan Abidi (1929–2005), Pakistani journalist, writer and Urdu-language poet
- Javed Abidi (1965–2018), disability rights activist
- Mehrdad Abedi, Iranian electrical engineer
- Nain Abidi (born 1985), international cricketer from Pakistan
- Omar Abidi, drummer for the English band Fightstar
- Raza Ali Abidi (born 1936), Pakistani journalist and radio broadcaster
- Razi Abedi, Pakistani writer
- Faisal Raza Abidi (born 1971), former senator representing the Pakistan People's Party (PPP) for Sindh Province
- Syed Ali Raza Abidi (1972–2018), Pakistani politician of the MQM party and also MPA of National Assembly
- Bani Abidi (born 1971), Pakistani visual artist

== See also ==
- Robson Vicente Gonçalves (born 1979), Brazilian footballer known as Abedi
- Abid
- Abida (disambiguation)
