= Pattan Assembly constituency =

Constituency of the Jammu and Kashmir Legislative Assembly

Coordinates: 34.162°N 74.554°E

Pattan
- Constituency No. 13 for the Jammu and Kashmir Legislative Assembly

Constituency details
- Country: India
- State: Jammu and Kashmir
- District: Baramulla
- Lok Sabha constituency: Baramulla
- Established: 1962

Member of Legislative Assembly
- Incumbent Javaid Riyaz
- Party: Jammu and Kashmir National Conference
- Elected year: 2024

Pattan Assembly constituency is one of the 90 constituencies of the Jammu and Kashmir Legislative Assembly of union territory of Jammu and Kashmir. Pattan is also part of Baramulla Lok Sabha constituency.

== Members of the Legislative Assembly ==
Election	Member	Party
1962	Ghulam Mohammad Bhat Zalib	Jammu & Kashmir National Conference
1967	G. R. Dar	Jammu & Kashmir National Conference
1972	Ghulam Qadir Bhdar	Indian National Congress
1977	Abdul Rashid Shaheen	Jammu & Kashmir National Conference
1983	Iftikhar Hussain Ansari	Indian National Congress
1987	Aga Syed Mahmood Almosvi	Jammu & Kashmir National Conference
1996	Iftikhar Hussain Ansari	Indian National Congress
2002	Iftikhar Hussain Ansari	Jammu & Kashmir National Conference
2006 By-election	Sheikh Mustafa Kamal	Jammu and Kashmir National Conference
2008	Iftikhar Hussain Ansari	Jammu and Kashmir People's Democratic Party
2014	Imran Raza Ansari	Jammu and Kashmir People's Democratic Party
2024	Javaid Riyaz	Jammu and Kashmir National Conference

== Election results ==
=== Assembly Election 2024 ===
2024 Jammu and Kashmir Legislative Assembly election : Pattan
Party	Candidate	Votes	%	±%
JKNC	Javaid Riyaz	29,893	42.54%	New
JKPC	Imran Raza Ansari	29,290	41.68%	New
Independent	Mohammed Akbar Rather	3,316	4.72%	New
JKPDP	Javid Iqbal Ganaie	2,758	3.92%	▼36.49
RLD	Mohammad Mustafa Lone	644	0.92%	New
Independent	Syeed Abrar Ahmad Shah	613	0.87%	New
JKAP	Reyaz Ahmad Sheikh	558	0.79%	New
NOTA	None of the Above	1,032	1.47%	▲0.39
Margin of victory		603	0.86%	▼16.92
Turnout		70,272	68.18%	▲9.46
Registered electors		1,03,069		▲15.27
JKNC gain from JKPDP		Swing	▲2.13	

=== Assembly Election 2014 ===
2014 Jammu and Kashmir Legislative Assembly election : Pattan
Party	Candidate	Votes	%	±%
JKPDP	Imran Raza Ansari	21,218	40.41%	▼10.73
JKNC	Aga Syed Mahmood Almosvi	11,884	22.63%	▼0.67
INC	Reyaz Ahmad	6,629	12.62%	▼0.10
Jammu & Kashmir Democratic Party Nationalist	Basharat Hussain Najar	4,666	8.89%	New
Independent	Abdul Rashid Shaheen	2,466	4.70%	New
Independent	Abdul Ahad Yatoo	2,280	4.34%	New
Independent	Farooq Ahmad Ganie	1,567	2.98%	New
NOTA	None of the Above	567	1.08%	New
Margin of victory		9,334	17.78%	▼10.07
Turnout		52,507	58.72%	▲7.88
Registered electors		89,416		▲12.29
JKPDP hold		Swing	▼10.73	

=== Assembly Election 2008 ===
2008 Jammu and Kashmir Legislative Assembly election : Pattan
Party	Candidate	Votes	%	±%
JKPDP	Iftikhar Hussain Ansari	20,703	51.14%	▲5.63
JKNC	Abdul Rashid Shaheen	9,432	23.30%	New
INC	Abdul Ahad Yatoo	5,152	12.73%	New
Independent	Manzoor Ahmad Ganai	1,047	2.59%	New
Independent	Abdul Hamid Wani	682	1.68%	New
SP	Abdul Rashid Najar	563	1.39%	New
BSP	Ashiq Hussain Lone	517	1.28%	New
Margin of victory		11,271	27.84%	▲22.59
Turnout		40,482	50.84%	▼18.13
Registered electors		79,628		▲4.29
JKPDP gain from JKNC		Swing	▲0.37	

=== Assembly By-election 2006 ===
2006 Jammu and Kashmir Legislative Assembly by-election : Pattan
Party	Candidate	Votes	%	±%
JKNC	Sheikh Mustafa Kamal	26,736	50.77%	New
JKPDP	Iftikhar Hussain Ansari	23,969	45.51%	New
JKNPP	Abdul Ahad Najar	996	1.89%	New
Independent	Nazir Ahmed Mir	962	1.83%	New
Margin of victory		2,767	5.25%	▼2.27
Turnout		52,663	68.97%	▲27.41
Registered electors		76,356		▲9.39
JKNC gain from JKNC		Swing	▼1.87	

=== Assembly Election 2002 ===
2002 Jammu and Kashmir Legislative Assembly election : Pattan
Party	Candidate	Votes	%	±%
JKNC	Iftikhar Hussain Ansari	15,268	52.63%	New
INC	Dr. Abdul Ahad Yatoo	13,084	45.10%	▼0.84
JKAL	Nazir Ahmad Mir	656	2.26%	New
Margin of victory		2,184	7.53%	▼12.75
Turnout		29,008	41.56%	▼26.84
Registered electors		69,803		▲16.25
JKNC gain from INC		Swing		

=== Assembly Election 1996 ===
1996 Jammu and Kashmir Legislative Assembly election : Pattan
Party	Candidate	Votes	%	±%
INC	Iftikhar Hussain Ansari	18,868	45.94%	New
JD	Abdul Rashid Shaheen	10,540	25.66%	New
Independent	Abdul Ahad Yatoo	9,836	23.95%	New
Independent	Khazir Mohammed Guroo	1,825	4.44%	New
Margin of victory		8,328	20.28%	▲0.50
Turnout		41,069	71.34%	▼11.27
Registered electors		60,047		▲24.80
INC gain from JKNC		Swing	▲1.93	

=== Assembly Election 1987 ===
1987 Jammu and Kashmir Legislative Assembly election : Pattan
Party	Candidate	Votes	%	±%
JKNC	Aga Syed Mahmood Almosvi	16,871	44.02%	▲7.65
Independent	Moulvi Mustafa Hussain	9,291	24.24%	New
Independent	Abdul Hamid Wani	5,539	14.45%	New
Independent	Abdul Rashid Shaheen	5,277	13.77%	New
JKNC	Ghulam Mohammed Yatto	763	1.99%	▼34.37
Independent	Ghulam Ahmed Ganiey	284	0.74%	New
Margin of victory		7,580	19.78%	▲16.92
Turnout		38,330	82.03%	▲4.87
Registered electors		48,114		▲20.01
JKNC gain from INC		Swing	▲4.79	

=== Assembly Election 1983 ===
1983 Jammu and Kashmir Legislative Assembly election : Pattan
Party	Candidate	Votes	%	±%
INC	Iftikhar Hussain Ansari	11,761	39.22%	▲36.90
JKNC	Abdul Aziz Parrey	10,904	36.36%	▼17.63
Independent	Abdul Rashid Shaheen	3,713	12.38%	New
JKNC	Bashir Ahmed Khan	3,609	12.04%	▼41.96
Margin of victory		857	2.86%	▼7.45
Turnout		29,987	78.52%	▼10.01
Registered electors		40,093		▲16.65
INC gain from JKNC		Swing	▼14.77	

=== Assembly Election 1977 ===
1977 Jammu and Kashmir Legislative Assembly election : Pattan
Party	Candidate	Votes	%	±%
JKNC	Abdul Rashid Shaheen	15,738	53.99%	New
JP	Iftikhar Hussain Ansari	12,734	43.69%	New
INC	Ghulam Qadir Bhdar	676	2.32%	▼74.45
Margin of victory		3,004	10.31%	▼53.63
Turnout		29,148	87.37%	▲19.37
Registered electors		34,370		▲15.09
JKNC gain from INC		Swing		

=== Assembly Election 1972 ===
1972 Jammu and Kashmir Legislative Assembly election : Pattan
Party	Candidate	Votes	%	±%
INC	Ghulam Qadir Bhdar	15,002	76.77%	▲33.67
Independent	Yousuf Shah	2,508	12.83%	New
Independent	Basir Ahmad	2,032	10.40%	New
Margin of victory		12,494	63.93%	▲50.13
Turnout		19,542	67.38%	▲14.12
Registered electors		29,864		▲12.30
INC gain from JKNC		Swing	▲19.87	

=== Assembly Election 1967 ===
1967 Jammu and Kashmir Legislative Assembly election : Pattan
Party	Candidate	Votes	%	±%
JKNC	G. R. Dar	7,764	56.90%	New
INC	G. Q. B. Bedar	5,881	43.10%	New
Margin of victory		1,883	13.80%	
Turnout		13,645	53.65%	▲51.31
Registered electors		26,592		▲12.12
JKNC hold		Swing		

=== Assembly Election 1962 ===
1962 Jammu and Kashmir Legislative Assembly election : Pattan
Party	Candidate	Votes	%	±%
JKNC	Ghulam Mohammad Bhat Zalib	Unopposed		
Registered electors		23,717		
JKNC win (new seat)				

== See also ==
- Pattan
- List of constituencies of Jammu and Kashmir Legislative Assembly
