= AVID =

AVID or Avid may refer to:

- Avid Technology, an American audio/video technology company
- Advancement Via Individual Determination (AVID), an American organisation training educators to prepare students for college
- Avid, a variant of the male given name Abid
- Avid Merrion, protagonist in the Bo' Selecta! British TV show
- Avid Home Entertainment, a division of Artisan Entertainment, a defunct American independent movie studio
- AVID, brand by SRAM Corporation
