= Zadibal Assembly constituency =

Constituency of the Jammu and Kashmir legislative assembly in India

Zadibal
- Constituency No. 24 for the Jammu and Kashmir Legislative Assembly

Constituency details
- Country: India
- State: Jammu and Kashmir
- District: Srinagar
- Lok Sabha constituency: Srinagar
- Established: 1996

Member of Legislative Assembly
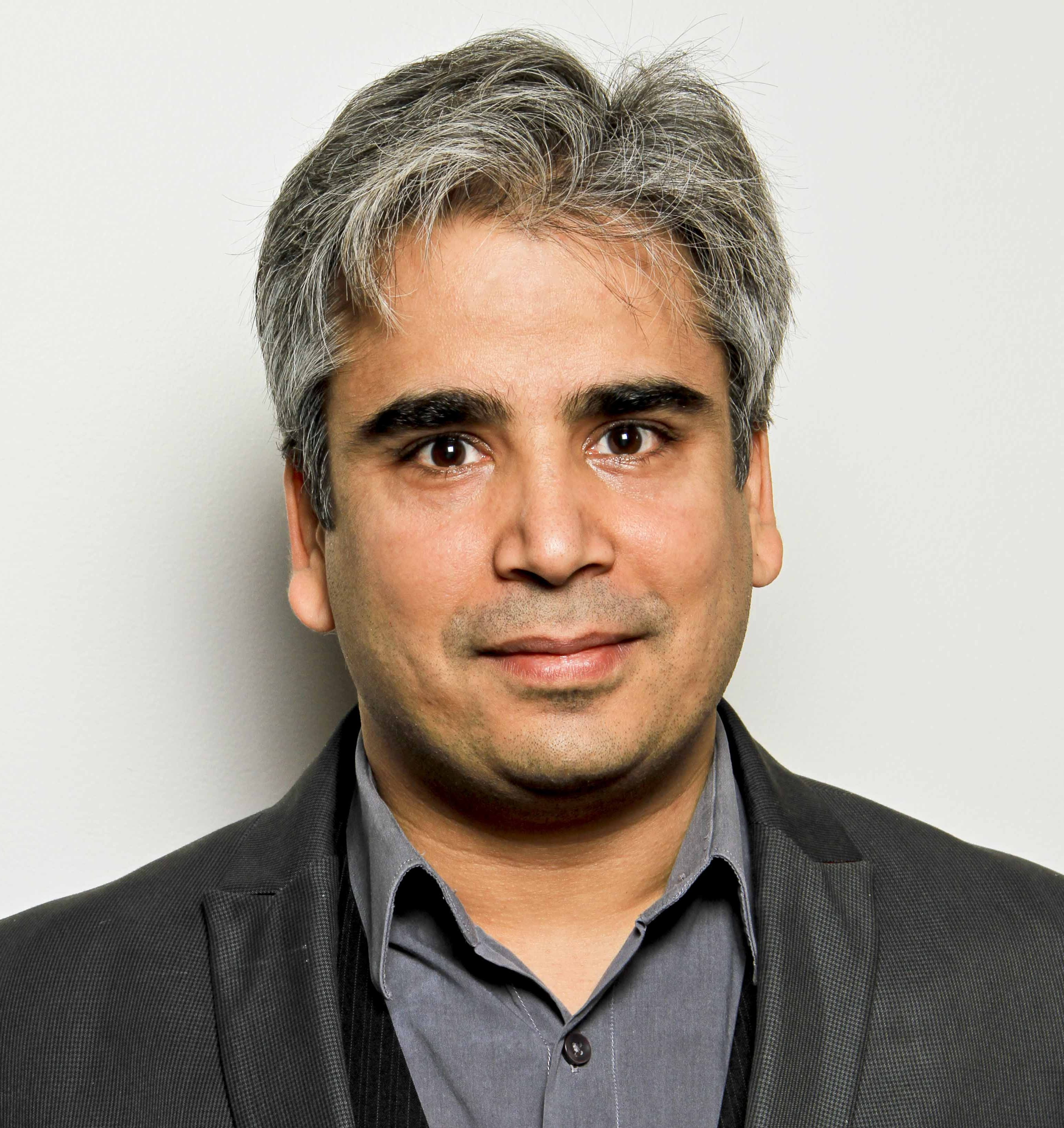
- Incumbent Tanvir Sadiq
- Party: Jammu & Kashmir National Conference
- Elected year: 2024

Zadibal is one of the 90 constituencies in Jammu and Kashmir Legislative Assembly in India administered union territory of Jammu and Kashmir. It comprises parts of Eidgah, North Srinagar and Khanyar tehsils, all in Srinagar district. It is also a part of the Srinagar Lok Sabha constituency.

== Members of the Legislative Assembly ==
Year	Member	Party
1962	Sheikh Mohammad Abdullah	Jammu & Kashmir National Conference
1967	Sheikh Mohammad Abdullah	Jammu & Kashmir National Conference
1972	Salim Anwar	Independent politician
1977	Ghulam Ahmad Shunthoo	Jammu & Kashmir National Conference
1983	Sheikh Abdul Rashid	Jammu & Kashmir National Conference
1987	Peer Mohammed Shafi	Jammu & Kashmir National Conference
1996	Sadiq Ali	Jammu & Kashmir National Conference
2002	Shahjahan Dar	Independent politician
2008	Peer Aafaq Ahmed	Jammu & Kashmir National Conference
2014	Abid Hussain Ansari	Jammu and Kashmir People's Democratic Party
2024	Tanvir Sadiq	Jammu and Kashmir National Conference

== Election results ==
=== Assembly Election 2024 ===
2024 Jammu and Kashmir Legislative Assembly election : Zadibal
Party	Candidate	Votes	%	±%
JKNC	Tanvir Sadiq	22,189	63.59%	New
JKPC	Abid Hussain Ansari	6,016	17.24%	▲13.82
Independent	Junaid Azim Mattu	2,700	7.74%	New
JKPDP	Sheikh Gowher Ali	956	2.74%	▼39.92
Independent	Mohammad Omar Hafiz	902	2.59%	New
NOTA	None of the Above	695	1.99%	▲1.24
JKAP	Tanveer Hussain Pathan	604	1.73%	New
Independent	Burhan Basheer Bazaz	391	1.12%	New
Margin of victory		16,173	46.35%	▲30.03
Turnout		34,893	30.92%	▲6.99
Registered electors		1,12,864		▲46.74
JKNC gain from JKPDP		Swing	▲20.93	

=== Assembly Election 2014 ===
2014 Jammu and Kashmir Legislative Assembly election : Zadibal
Party	Candidate	Votes	%	±%
JKPDP	Abid Hussain Ansari	7,852	42.66%	▲17.77
JKNC	Peer Aafaq Ahmad	4,849	26.35%	▼8.54
Independent	Shahid Ali Kachroo	1,329	7.22%	New
Independent	Nazir Ud Din Ahmad	1,063	5.78%	New
INC	Shameema Raina	922	5.01%	▼0.74
JKPC	Mohammed Ashraf Dar	630	3.42%	New
Independent	Arshid Hussain	468	2.54%	New
BJP	Neelam Gaash	360	1.96%	New
Independent	Saleem Akhtar Malik	242	1.31%	New
Independent	Syed Owais Qadri	241	1.31%	New
NOTA	None of the Above	138	0.75%	New
Margin of victory		3,003	16.32%	▲6.33
Turnout		18,404	23.93%	▲6.63
Registered electors		76,915		▲7.10
JKPDP gain from JKNC		Swing	▲7.78	

=== Assembly Election 2008 ===
2008 Jammu and Kashmir Legislative Assembly election : Zadibal
Party	Candidate	Votes	%	±%
JKNC	Peer Aafaq Ahmed	4,335	34.89%	▼2.72
JKPDP	Shahi Jahan Dar	3,094	24.90%	▲23.23
Independent	Tanvir Sadiq	2,759	22.20%	New
INC	Mushtaq Ahmed Tantray	715	5.75%	▼0.57
Independent	Abul Hassan Khan	240	1.93%	New
BSP	Nasir Ahmed Naikoo	227	1.83%	New
JKPDF	Mohammed Yousuf Shair	176	1.42%	New
Independent	Syed Ajaz Ahmed Rizvi	166	1.34%	New
JKANC	Raja Iftikhar Hussain	135	1.09%	New
Independent	Rabia	134	1.08%	New
Jammu & Kashmir Democratic Party Nationalist	Muzaffar Hussain Reshi	127	1.02%	New
Margin of victory		1,241	9.99%	▲0.92
Turnout		12,426	17.30%	▲12.52
Registered electors		71,819		▲5.85
JKNC gain from Independent		Swing	▼11.78	

=== Assembly Election 2002 ===
2002 Jammu and Kashmir Legislative Assembly election : Zadibal
Party	Candidate	Votes	%	±%
Independent	Shah jahan Dar	1,514	46.67%	New
JKNC	Sadiq Ali	1,220	37.61%	▼11.47
INC	Syed Abdullah Rizvi	205	6.32%	▼12.11
Independent	Abdul Qayoom	102	3.14%	New
BJP	Syed Maqsood Shah	93	2.87%	New
JKPDP	A. R. Wani	54	1.66%	New
Independent	Mohammed Muzzafar	25	0.77%	New
JKNPP	Sikander	21	0.65%	▼6.33
Margin of victory		294	9.06%	▼15.86
Turnout		3,244	4.78%	▼7.51
Registered electors		67,852		▲38.79
Independent gain from JKNC		Swing	▼2.41	

=== Assembly Election 1996 ===
1996 Jammu and Kashmir Legislative Assembly election : Zadibal
Party	Candidate	Votes	%	±%
JKNC	Sadiq Ali	2,948	49.08%	▼5.35
JD	Abdul Hassan Bhat	1,451	24.16%	New
INC	Syed Abdulla Safvi	1,107	18.43%	New
JKNPP	Ramzan Bangi	419	6.98%	New
Independent	Abdul Rashid Kabli	82	1.37%	New
Margin of victory		1,497	24.92%	▲14.57
Turnout		6,007	12.68%	▼57.21
Registered electors		48,887		▼32.31
JKNC hold		Swing	▼5.35	

=== Assembly Election 1987 ===
1987 Jammu and Kashmir Legislative Assembly election : Zadibal
Party	Candidate	Votes	%	±%
JKNC	Peer Mohammed Shafi	27,316	54.42%	▼34.12
Independent	Peer Abdul Rouf	22,121	44.07%	New
Independent	A. R. Wani	755	1.50%	New
Margin of victory		5,195	10.35%	▼71.10
Turnout		50,192	71.24%	▼18.11
Registered electors		72,225		▲12.19
JKNC hold		Swing		

=== Assembly Election 1983 ===
1983 Jammu and Kashmir Legislative Assembly election : Zadibal
Party	Candidate	Votes	%	±%
JKNC	Sheikh Abdul Rashid	49,937	88.54%	▲36.99
Independent	Jehangir Ali Khan	4,001	7.09%	New
INC	Mohmmed Amim Bhat	1,710	3.03%	New
JKNC	Mohammed Ashraf	545	0.97%	▼50.59
Margin of victory		45,936	81.45%	▲77.31
Turnout		56,399	88.93%	▲7.12
Registered electors		64,380		▲14.15
JKNC hold		Swing	▲36.99	

=== Assembly Election 1977 ===
1977 Jammu and Kashmir Legislative Assembly election : Zadibal
Party	Candidate	Votes	%	±%
JKNC	Ghulam Ahmad Shunthoo	23,401	51.55%	New
JP	Salim Anwar Dhar	21,522	47.41%	New
JI	Ghulam Nabi Nowshehri	469	1.03%	▼2.20
Margin of victory		1,879	4.14%	▼10.21
Turnout		45,392	81.71%	▲23.36
Registered electors		56,400		▲72.35
JKNC gain from Independent		Swing		

=== Assembly Election 1972 ===
1972 Jammu and Kashmir Legislative Assembly election : Zadibal
Party	Candidate	Votes	%	±%
Independent	Salim Anwar Dhar	6,173	33.02%	New
Independent	Aga Syed Afzil Jalali	3,491	18.68%	New
Independent	Ali Mohammed	1,842	9.85%	New
INC	Peer Gayas Ud Din	1,698	9.08%	▼19.49
Independent	Syed Abdulla Shah	1,681	8.99%	New
ABJS	Hari Krishan	1,182	6.32%	▼6.07
Independent	Sadiq Ali	753	4.03%	New
JI	Ghulam Nabi Nowshehri	604	3.23%	New
Independent	Mohamed Shafi	342	1.83%	New
Independent	Misra Bano	287	1.54%	New
Independent	Mohamed Yusuf	247	1.32%	New
Margin of victory		2,682	14.35%	▼9.18
Turnout		18,692	60.53%	▲29.86
Registered electors		32,724		▲29.15
Independent gain from JKNC		Swing	▼19.07	

=== Assembly Election 1967 ===
1967 Jammu and Kashmir Legislative Assembly election : Zadibal
Party	Candidate	Votes	%	±%
JKNC	Shaik Mohammad Abdullah	3,599	52.10%	▼31.66
INC	M. A. Shair	1,974	28.58%	New
ABJS	S. Nath	856	12.39%	New
CPI	A. Shah	314	4.55%	New
Independent	S. G. Mohammed	165	2.39%	New
Margin of victory		1,625	23.52%	▼44.00
Turnout		6,908	28.55%	▼40.95
Registered electors		25,338		▲2.73
JKNC hold		Swing	▼31.66	

=== Assembly Election 1962 ===
1962 Jammu and Kashmir Legislative Assembly election : Zadibal
Party	Candidate	Votes	%	±%
JKNC	Shaik Mohammad Abdullah	14,093	83.76%	New
Independent	Syed Abdullah Shah	2,732	16.24%	New
Margin of victory		11,361	67.52%	
Turnout		16,825	72.24%	
Registered electors		24,665		
JKNC win (new seat)				
