= Tahsin Pasha (civil servant) =

Ottoman Empire politician

Hasan Tahsin Pasha
- حسن تحسين پاشا

Chief Secretary of the Imperial Palace
- In office 1894–1908
- Monarch: Abdul Hamid II
- Preceded by: Süreyya Pasha
- Succeeded by: Cevad Pasha

Personal details
- Born: 1845 Ottoman Empire
- Died: 1933 (aged 87–88) Istanbul, Turkey
- Occupation: Politician

Hasan Tahsin Pasha (1845 – 1933) was an Ottoman bureaucrat and pasha. He served as First Secretary of Ottoman Sultan Abdulhamid II between 1894 and 1908.

== Biography ==
He was appointed to this role on 26 November 1894 and became an influential figure in the politics of the Sublime Porte. According to Tevfik Bey's (Biren) testimony, he played a key role in the appointment of Mehmed Ferid Pasha to the post of the Grand Vizier, in an attempt to diminish the influence of Ahmad Izzat al-Abid over the Sultan. This political alliance was not long-lasting, Ferid Pasha's son recounts that his father nicknamed Tahsin Pasha "Kara Tahsin" (lit. "Black Tahsin"), in part due to his complexion, but also because "this man, who was fearful for his position and who had unlimited ambitions, was hostile to [his] father". Tahsin Pasha himself accused Mehmed Ferid Pasha of hypocrisy and incompetence in his memoirs. He had his own competing faction, vying for influence at the Porte during this period. His faction included prominent members of the Bedirhani family, such as Ali Şamil Pasha and Rıdvan İsmail Pasha.

He was nicknamed "Serhafiye" ("the Chief Informant", a reference to the Umur-u Hafiye, the domestic intelligence organisation) by the Young Turks. In the wake of the rise of the Committee of Union and Progress to power with the Young Turk Revolution, Abdulhamid was forced to dismiss Tahsin Pasha of his position, replacing him with Cevad Pasha on 4 August 1908.

He was of ethnic Turkish descent and only spoke Turkish. His memoirs, titled Abdülhamid ve Yıldız Hatıraları ("Memories of Abdülhamid and the Yıldız Palace") serve as an important primary source detailing the court life under Abdulhamid II.

== In popular culture ==
Between 2017 and 2021, he was played by actor Bahadır Yenişehirlioğlu in TRT's Payitaht: Abdülhamid series.
