= Senior advisor =

Appointed position to advise on national and government policy

In some countries, a senior advisor (also spelt senior adviser, especially in the UK) is an appointed position by the head of state to advise on the highest levels of national and government policy. Sometimes a junior position to this is called a national policy advisor. In some instances, these advisors form a council of state or a state council. Senior Advisor is also a title for senior civil servants or partisan advisors in several countries and is also used in nonprofit organisations.

== Pakistan ==
Advisor to President of Pakistan is a title mostly used for the member of advisory committee to the president of Pakistan. The Constitution of Pakistan allows the president to keep advisors. The president is the ceremonial head of the state and the civilian commander-in-chief of the Pakistan Armed Forces, with the Chairman Joint Chiefs of Staff Committee as its principal military adviser. Abdul Qadir Patel was appointed as political advisor to President Asif Zardari after the resignation of former adviser Faisal Raza Abidi.

== Sri Lanka ==
Senior Adviser to the President is a title used by highest-ranking advisers to the president of Sri Lanka.

== Taiwan ==
The president of the Republic of China (Taiwan) can appoint senior advisors to the Office of the President of the Republic of China (中華民國總統府資政) and national policy advisors to the Office of the President of the Republic of China (中華民國總統府國策顧問), but they do not form a council.

== United States ==
Senior advisor is a title used within the executive branch of the United States government for various positions. The title has been formally used since 1993.

== Nonprofit organizations ==
In nonprofit organizations, senior advisors deploy specialized expertise in support of an organization's mission. They may provide counsel and advice with respect to various aspects of its work. Senior advisors often serve to fill lacunae in the skill sets of directors or executives.
