= Daastar-e-Ana =

- Written by: Amin Sadiq
- Directed by: Mohsin Talat
- Starring: Uzma Gillani; Abid Ali; Saniya Shamshad; Faisal Rehman; Kashif Mehmood; Ayesha Gul
- Country of origin: Pakistan
- Original language: Urdu
- No. of episodes: 40

Production
- Producers: Mohsin Talat; Syed Afzal Ali; Uzma Mohsin
- Production company: QT Productions

Original release
- Network: TV One Pakistan
- Release: 2017 – 2018

Dastaar-e-Ana is a Pakistani television serial aired on TV One from 2017 to 2018. It stars Uzma Gillani, Abid Ali, Saniya Shamshad, Faisal Rehman, Kashif Mehmood and Ayesha Gul.

== Cast ==
- Uzma Gillani as Zaibunnisa
- Abid Ali as Muzaffar Khan
- Saniya Shamshad as Mahnoor
- Kashif Mehmood as Waleed
- Faisal Rehman as Hashim
- Ayesha Gul as Riffat
- Salman Saeed as Adeel
- Arsalan Faisal as Abid
- Shamoon Abbasi (cameo)

== Production ==
Dastaar-e-Ana was written by Amin Sadiq and directed by Mohsin Talat. It marked the on-screen collaboration of Uzma Gillani and Abid Ali after fourteen years. The principal photography of the serial took place in Karachi and Murree, and got delayed due to the unavailability of Gillani due to her husband's death.
