= Jitendra Singh (Uttar Pradesh politician) =

Indian politician

Jitendra Singh is a politician from the Bahujan Samaj Party and currently named as the vice president of UP Handball Association. In 2007 he was elected as Member of Legislative Assembly representing Bikapur constituency in Faizabad District in the state legislature of Uttar Pradesh. He was a renowned basketball player.

He was arrested along with Intezar Abidi for attacking and setting fire to the house of State Congress leader Rita Bahuguna in central Lucknow. He is often referred to with epithets such as 'Bahubali', 'Don' or the 'Don of Eastern Uttar Pradesh'. He has been known for the good works in his constituency. A nickname has also been given to him by the people 'Bablu Bhaiya'. His brother Guddu Singh is also MLC from the same party.
