= Iftikhar Hussain Ansari =

Indian politician, businessman and religious scholar

- افتخار حسين الأنصاري
- Constituency: Pattan, Baramulla, Kashmir

Personal details
- Born: 26 April 1942 Srinagar, Jammu and Kashmir, British Raj
- Died: 30 September 2014 (aged 72) Srinagar Jammu and Kashmir India
- Resting place: Baba Mazar, Zadibal, Srinagar
- Party: Jammu and Kashmir People's Democratic Party
- Other political affiliations: President, All Jammu and Kashmir Shia Association, Chairman Imam Hussain A.S Charitable Trust; President, Maarif-Uloom-Islami [Educational wing of All Jammu and Kashmir Shia Association ].; Indian National Congress; Jammu and Kashmir National Conference; Jammu and Kashmir People's Conference; Janata Party; Independent
- Children: Imran Raza Ansari, Irfan Raza Ansari, and a daughter
- Education: Sultanul Madaris, Lucknow, India; Hawza Elmia Najaf, Najaf, Iraq
- Occupation: Politician, Businessman, Religious Cleric

Iftikhar Hussain Ansari (26 April 1942 – 30 September 2014), widely known among his followers as Moulvi Sahib, was a Kashmiri Shia cleric, politician, businessman and a proponent of the Grand Ashura Procession In Kashmir. Ansari was a Wakil (Representative) of Ayatollah Sistani. He was also the representative of Ruhollah Khomeini.

He was one of the leading Shia clerics in Kashmir and had close relations with multiple other important scholars such as Sayyid Jawad Shahristani, Mohammad Alavi Gorgani and Lotfollah Safi Golpaygani. He studied at Sultanul Madaris Lucknow, as well as Hawza Najaf. He succeeded his father Muhammad Jawad Ansari as president of the All Jammu and Kashmir Shia Association in Jammu & Kashmir in 1962, a position which he held for life. He was four-time member of Jammu and Kashmir's Legislative Assembly for the Jammu and Kashmir People's Democratic Party from Pattan Assembly segment; he was earlier a member of the National Conference and Congress.

In 1978, He along with Abdul Ghani Lone founded the Jammu and Kashmir People's Conference of which his son and brother are now a part.

== Political career ==
Iftikhar Hussain Ansari was a prominent politician known for his four-term tenure as a Member of the Legislative Assembly (MLA) from the Pattan Assembly segment in Jammu and Kashmir. He also served as a Member of the Legislative Council (MLC) for two non consecutive terms. He garnered a substantial following among the Shia community in the state due to his background as a Shia cleric. He had also served as a Minister of the State Government numerous times, holding portfolios like Housing and Urban Development, a department which he is most well known for having revolutionised. Ansari also focused on environmental issues and is remembered for starting a large scale project to clean the Dal Lake.

Ansari's political journey commenced in the 1960s when he entered the realm of public service. In 1973, he was nominated as a Member of the Legislative Council (MLC) on the ticket of the Indian National Congress. However, during the 1977 elections, he shifted his allegiance to the Janata Party.

Returning to the Indian National Congress fold in the 1980s, Ansari's leadership qualities were recognized, and he was appointed as the leader of the Legislature party in the Jammu and Kashmir State Assembly from 1983 to 1987.

In 1996, he secured a victory in the state legislative assembly elections, once again on a Congress ticket, and subsequently assumed a ministerial role in the National Conference (NC) government, headed by Farooq Abdullah.

Ansari's association with various political parties continued over the years. In 2002, he joined the Jammu and Kashmir National Conference (NC) and successfully contested the election from the Pattan Assembly constituency. However, in 2006, he decided to switch to the People's Democratic Party (PDP). Unfortunately, he faced defeat in the ensuing by-election.

In the 2008 elections, Ansari secured a significant win on a PDP ticket, further solidifying his political standing within the state. As of 2014, he was nominated as the party's candidate for the forthcoming assembly elections, reflecting the trust and support he enjoyed within the party ranks. After his death, his son, Molvi Imran Reza Ansari who was earlier the party’s candidate from Zadibal constituency, was nominated as party candidate for Pattan constituency, and won with a landslide achieving the highest victory margin in the J&K Elections 2014.

== Electoral performance ==
Election	Constituency	Party	Result	Votes %	Opposition Candidate	Opposition Party	Opposition vote %	Ref
2008	Pattan	JKPDP	Won	51.14%	Abdul Rashid Shaheen	JKNC	23.30%	
2006 By-election	Pattan	JKPDP	Lost	45.51%	Sheikh Mustafa Kamal	JKNC	50.77%	
2002	Pattan	JKNC	Won	52.63%	Dr. Abdul Ahad Yatoo	INC	45.10%	
1996	Pattan	INC	Won	45.94%	Abdul Rashid Shaheen	JD	25.66%	
1983	Pattan	INC	Won	39.22%	Abdul Aziz Parrey	JKNC	36.36%	
1977	Pattan	JP	Lost	43.69%	Abdul Rashid Shaheen	JKNC	53.99%	

== Assassination Attempts ==
Ansari was thrice the target of unsuccessful assassination attempts. In June 2000, Ansari barely escaped the explosion of a landmine while addressing a religious congregation at Gund Khwaja Qasim. The blast killed twelve of his followers. On 1 September 2000, Ansari was injured by an IED explosion that killed two policemen and a driver.

== Death ==
Ansari died at his residence in Dar ul Jawad, Qamarwari, Srinagar on the morning of 30 September 2014 after a prolonged liver illness. Ansari had been undergoing specialized treatment in the United States. Various political, religious and social leaders offered condolences. Several hundred thousand people attended his funeral, shops were closed, and all activities were halted in Shia dominated areas, as a final adieu to their beloved leader. People from all spheres, faiths, and backgrounds attended his funeral and, internationally as well condolences were issues. His funeral procession was taken from his residence in Qamarwari to Imambara Zadibal where Namaz e Jenazah was offered. He was buried in his ancestral graveyard, Baba Mazar, Alamgari Bazar, Zadibal, Srinagar.
