= Colorado (company) =

Moroccan paint company

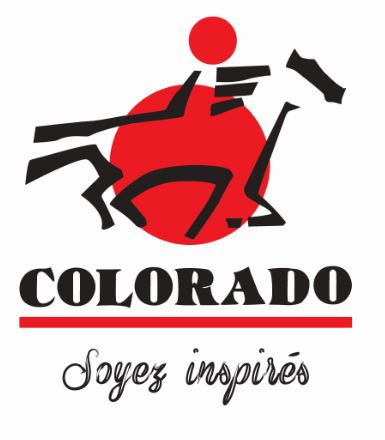
- Colorado logo
- Type: Public
- Traded as: MASI: COL
- Industry: Paint; Chemicals
- Founded: 1962
- Founder: Berrada family
- Headquarters: Casablanca, Morocco
- Key people: Souleiman Berrada; Abed Chagar (CEO); Meriem Lotfi (Deputy CEO)
- Products: Stella, Rovana, Ambra, Touareg, Sicilia, etc.
- Revenue: 609.9 million dirhams (2022)
- Net income: 35.3 million dirhams (2022)
- Number of employees: 277 (2022)
- Website: www.colorado.ma

Colorado is a Moroccan company founded in 1962 and majority owned by the Berrada family.

Currently led by Abed Chagar, it specializes in the manufacture and distribution of paints (building paints, industrial paints, automotive refinishing paints, functional paints and tinting machine paints).

The company has been listed on the Casablanca Stock Exchange since 2006.

== History ==
The Colorado company was created in 1962. In 1970, the Berrada brothers took over the company and started manufacturing paints and varnishes.

In 1979, the company made a first capital increase to 1,400,000DH.

In 1982, Colorado launched its first TV advertising campaign: "Colorado, paints that stand the test of time...".

In 1991, Colorado opened its first professional paint school.

In 1993, Colorado obtained quality certification from the Public Laboratory for Testing and Research.

In 2000, the company implemented a regionalization policy by opening agencies in different regions of Morocco.

In 2003, Colorado obtained ISO 9001 version 2000 certification for marketing, research and development activities.

In 2004, the company commissioned a new water-based paint factory.

In 2006, Colorado announced its initial public offering on the Casablanca Stock Exchange. and the inauguration of its second factory specializing in solvent-based paints.

In 2007, the group inaugurated its first showroom in Casablanca in the Zerktouni region.

In 2009, the company was certified to OHSAS 18001 Version 2007 for occupational health and safety and ISO 14001 Version 2004 for the environment. That same year, Colorado opened its second 350 m2 showroom in the city of Tangier.

In 2010, in partnership with the Valspar group, the company launched the automotive bodywork range.

In 2011, Colorado opened 2 more showrooms in Kenitra and Meknes.

In 2012, Colorado became the first and only paint company in Morocco to obtain Authorized Economic Operator status with Customs.

In January 2013, the late CEO Farid Berrada and his family died in a plane crash near Grenoble airport. Group management was handled by Abed Chagar, Deputy CEO.

In November 2014, Colorado organized the 1st building professionals meeting. The company presented its latest innovations at this event, including Isol'Déco and Magic Color System.

In January 2015, Colorado joined the "Construction Materials" class on the Casablanca Stock Exchange.

In June 2017, Colorado received a certificate of excellence in professional equality, issued by the Ministry of Employment and Vocational Integration in recognition of its good professional practices in gender equality.

In May 2018, Colorado succeeded in obtaining the "Smoke-Free Company" Gold level label from the Lalla Salma Foundation for the 5th consecutive year.

In August 2018, Colorado was selected for the Al Jada mega project located in the city of Sharjah, capital of the emirate of the same name. Considered one of the largest real estate projects in Sharjah, the project covers an area of 224 hectares.

In 2020, Colorado inaugurated a new agency in Fez.

In February 2021, Colorado accelerated its expansion in Sub-Saharan Africa by inaugurating a showroom in Bamako, the capital of Mali.

In March 2021, the company launched "Coloclean", an anti-coronavirus paint.

In December 2021, the company was certified Triple A by Coface (French Export Credit Insurance Company) for the 7th consecutive year (2015, 2016, 2017, 2018, 2019 and 2020).

In June 2022, Colorado announced a capital increase of 40.3 million dirhams to reach 161.17 million dirhams through the allocation of bonus shares.

In December 2022, Colorado obtained ISO 27001 certification for data and information system security.

In September 2023, Colorado announced a donation of one million dirhams to the Special Fund 126 for managing the effects of the earthquake that hit Morocco on September 8, 2023.

== Economic data ==
The company sold paint in 2016 with a turnover of 450 million DH. It received the European Ecolabel label. An investment in R&D of 10 million DH was made to develop eco-products.

In 2017, the company's turnover increased by 3% to reach 547 million DH.

In 2018, Colorado recorded a turnover of 524.5 million MAD.

At the end of 2019, Colorado achieved a turnover of 500 million MAD and an investment of 11.6 million MAD. Net debt reached 62.3 million MAD.

In 2022, the company announced selling 55,000 tonnes of paint for a turnover of 609.9 million MAD (an increase of 6.2% compared to 2021). Colorado also invested 10 million MAD in acquiring new equipment and renovating buildings.

== Distribution ==
In Morocco, Colorado has two logistics platforms (Casablanca and Algharb) and has eight showrooms and 4 regional agencies in the cities of Casablanca, Kenitra, Fez, Oujda, Marrakesh, Agadir and Meknes.

== International activity ==
The Colorado company is present through showrooms in several African countries including: Algeria, Cameroon, Chad, Ivory Coast, Mali, Congo, Nigeria, Benin, Mauritania and Senegal.

== Projects ==
Colorado has contributed to the completion of several projects in Morocco:

- Mohammed VI Tower - Rabat
- Marriott Arribat Center Hotel - Rabat
- Kasr Al Bahr Four Seasons - Rabat
- ENA - Tétouan
- Lycée D’excellence - Benguerir
- Agadir University Hospital Center - Agadir
- Arena Stadium - Tangier

== Partnerships ==
Colorado has several partnership agreements with companies and associations, including:

- Valspar
- AZIAN (Ain Sebaa Industrial Zone Association)
- FME (Moroccan Student Foundation)

== Awards ==
- 2017: Special Jury Prize - Prevention Trophies
- 2018: Top Performers Trophy - Vigeo Eiris (Social and Environmental Responsibility)
- 2021: Top Performers Trophy - Vigeo Eiris (Social and Environmental Responsibility)

== Sponsorships ==
Colorado supports several Moroccan humanitarian associations and organizations:

- Tibu Maroc Association
- L'Heure Joyeuse Association
- Moroccan "Sport and Development" Association
- Mawada Association
- INSAF Association
- Taj El Khair Association
