= Khuda Bakhsh Oriental Library =

Library in India

- Location: Patna, Bihar, India
- Type: National library
- Established: 29 October 1891

Collection
- Items collected: Manuscripts, books, journals, newspapers, magazines, sound and music recordings, patents, databases, maps, stamps, prints and drawings etc
- Size: 2,082,904 (printed books); 21,136 (manuscripts) (5,000,000 total items)
- Legal deposit: Yes, Institution of National Importance by Act of Parliament, 26 December 1969

Access and use
- Access requirements: Open to anyone with a genuine need to use the collection

Other information
- Director: Dr Md Zahidul Haque, (since June 2026)
- Website: http://kblibrary.bih.nic.in/

Khuda Bakhsh Oriental Library is one of the national libraries of India, located in Patna, Bihar. It was opened to public on 29 October 1891 by Khan Bahadur Khuda Bakhsh with 4,000 manuscripts, of which he inherited 1,400 from his father Maulvi Mohammed Bakhsh. It is an autonomous organization under Ministry of Culture, Government of India, and is governed by a Board with the Governor of Bihar as its ex officio Chairman, and is known for its rare collection of Persian and Arabic manuscripts. It also hosts paintings made during the Rajput and Mughal eras of India.

It is also a designated 'Manuscript Conservation Centre' (MCC) under the National Mission for Manuscripts.

== History ==
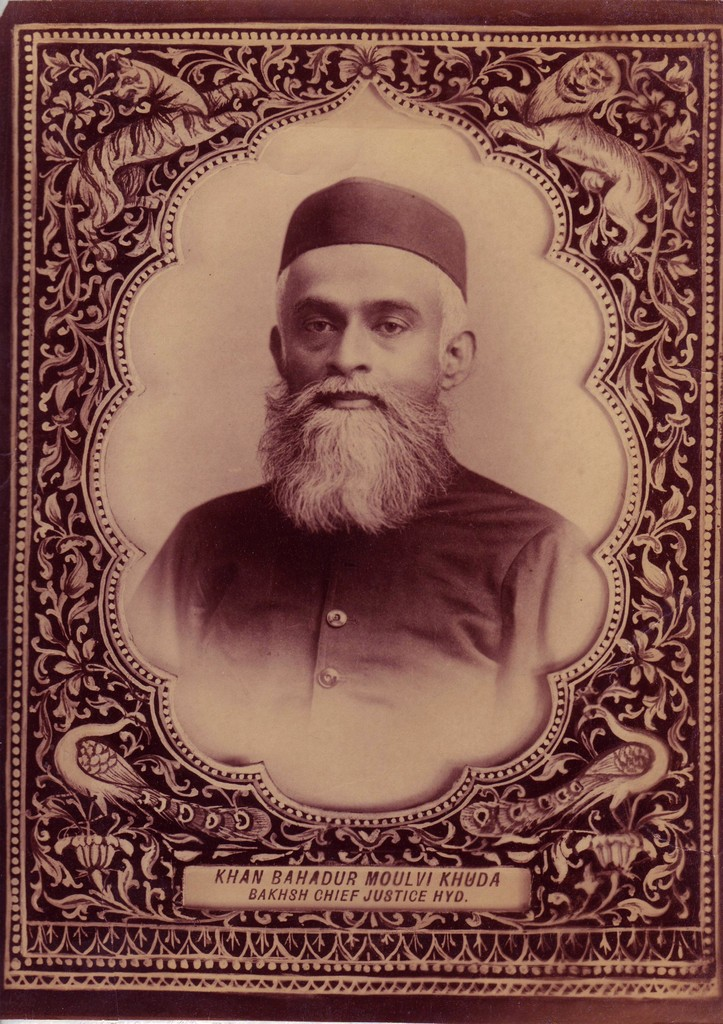
Maulvi Khuda Bakhsh

== Digitisation and research ==
The library has significantly expanded its digitisation and preservation efforts in recent years. According to the Ministry of Culture, it preserves over 21,000 manuscripts and continues to digitise rare collections to improve access for researchers and scholars worldwide.

The library also maintains conservation laboratories for the preservation of fragile manuscripts and has made thousands of digitised folios available for research through its digital initiatives.

=== The person ===
In 1895, he was appointed Chief Justice of the High Court of Nizam's Kingdom. After staying there for almost 3 years, he returned to Patna again and started practicing. But soon he was suffering from paralysis and he limited his activity to the library only. Due to his illness, he could not complete his activities. Rs.8000 to pay debt and library secretary and Rs. 200 were sanctioned as pension. He could not recover from paralysis and died on 3 August 1908.

=== Library ===
The library finds its origin in private collection of a bibliophile Mohammad Bakhsh and expanded by his son Khuda Bakhsh, who inherited 1,400 manuscripts and continued to add to the collection and eventually converted it into a private library by 1880. The library was opened to public upon its inauguration by Sir Charles Alfred Elliott, Governor of Bengal on 5 October 1891. After partition in 1947, Dr. S.V. Sohoni played a key role in ensuring that the collections were retained in India. In 1969 through a Federal Legislation, an Act of Parliament, namely 'Khuda Bakhsh Oriental Public Library Act' (1969), the Government of India declared Khuda Bakhsh Oriental Public Library a centre of national importance and government took over the funding, maintenance and development of the library. Today it continues to attract scholars from all over the world.

Past directors of the library have been Dr. Abid Reza Bedar, who after remaining with the Raza Library, came as Director to the institution in 1972, and did some important work towards reviving the library along with his successor Habibur Rehman Chighani, at present the Director of the library is the Dr. Md Zahidul Haque, since June, 2026. It is on its way to become the country's first library to computerize its hand written collection for universal dissemination.

In 2021, the demolition of parts of the historic library building was proposed as part of a project to construct a flyover. This has sparked controversy and several activists and organisations including INTACH have appealed against the demolition.

== Collection ==
Some of the notable manuscripts are Timur Nama (Khandan--Timuria), Shah Nama, Padshah Nama, Diwan-e-Hafiz and Safinatul Auliya, carrying the autograph of Mughal Emperors and princes and the book of Military Accounts of Maharaja Ranjit Singh. Apart from it the library also has specimens of Mughal paintings, calligraphy and book decoration and Arabic and Urdu manuscripts, including a page of Quran written on deer skin.

There are 21,136 manuscripts in the library of Arabic, Persian, Urdu, Turkish and Pashto languages.

The library also has a manuscript of Sahih al-Bukhari hand-transcribed by Shaykh Muhammad ibn Yazdan Bakhsh Bengali in Ekdala, eastern Bengal. The manuscript was a gift to the Sultan of Bengal Alauddin Husain Shah.

== Gallery ==
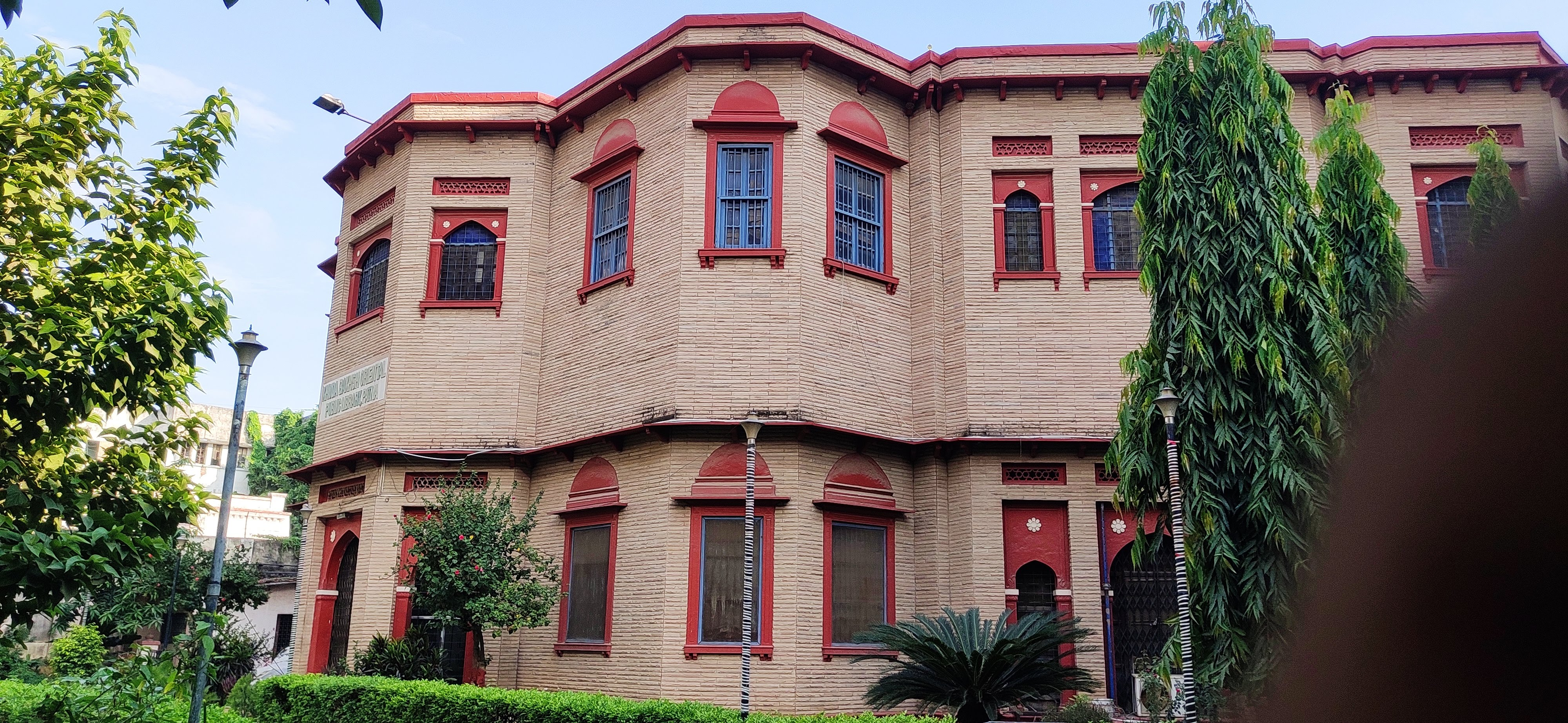
Khuda Bakhsh Oriental Library Building

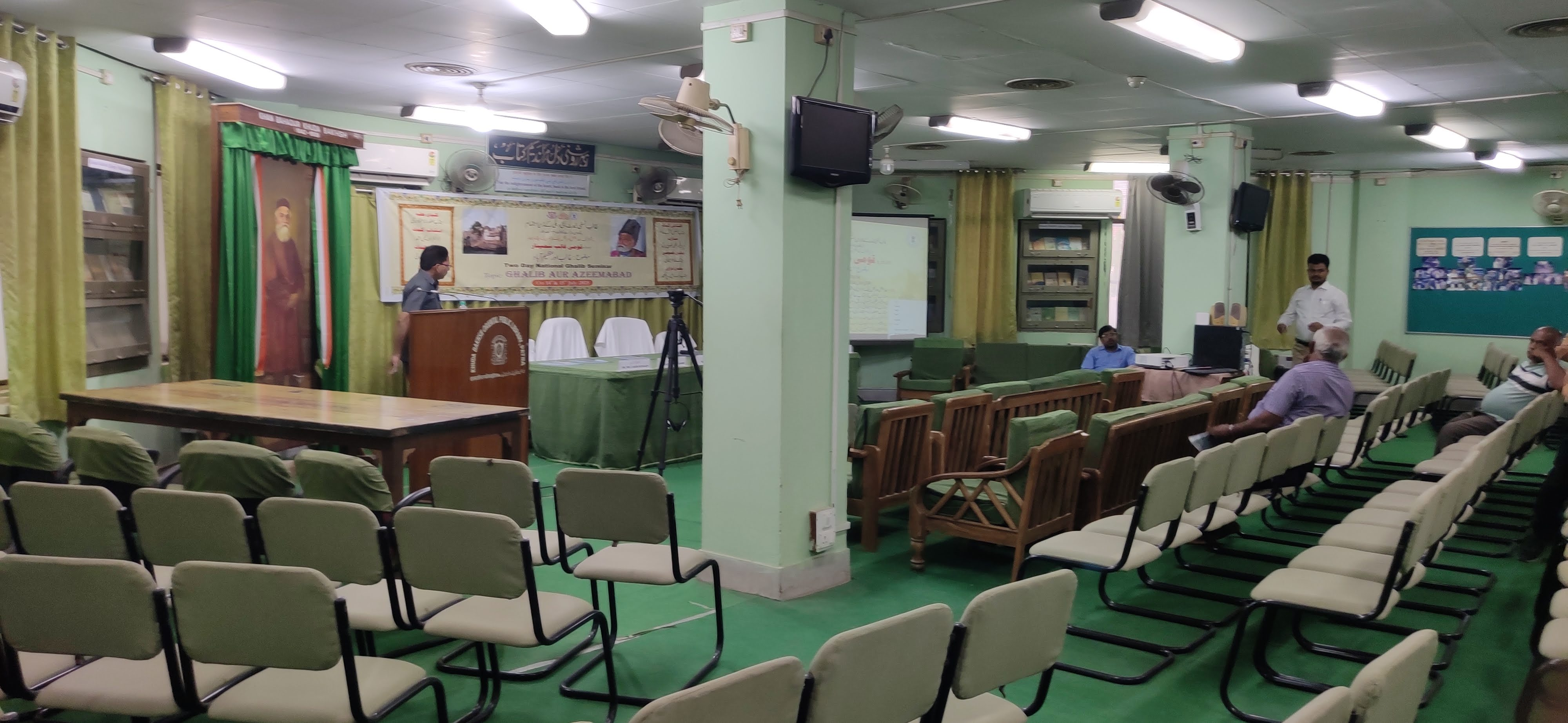
Seminar Hall Khuda Bakhsh Oriental Library

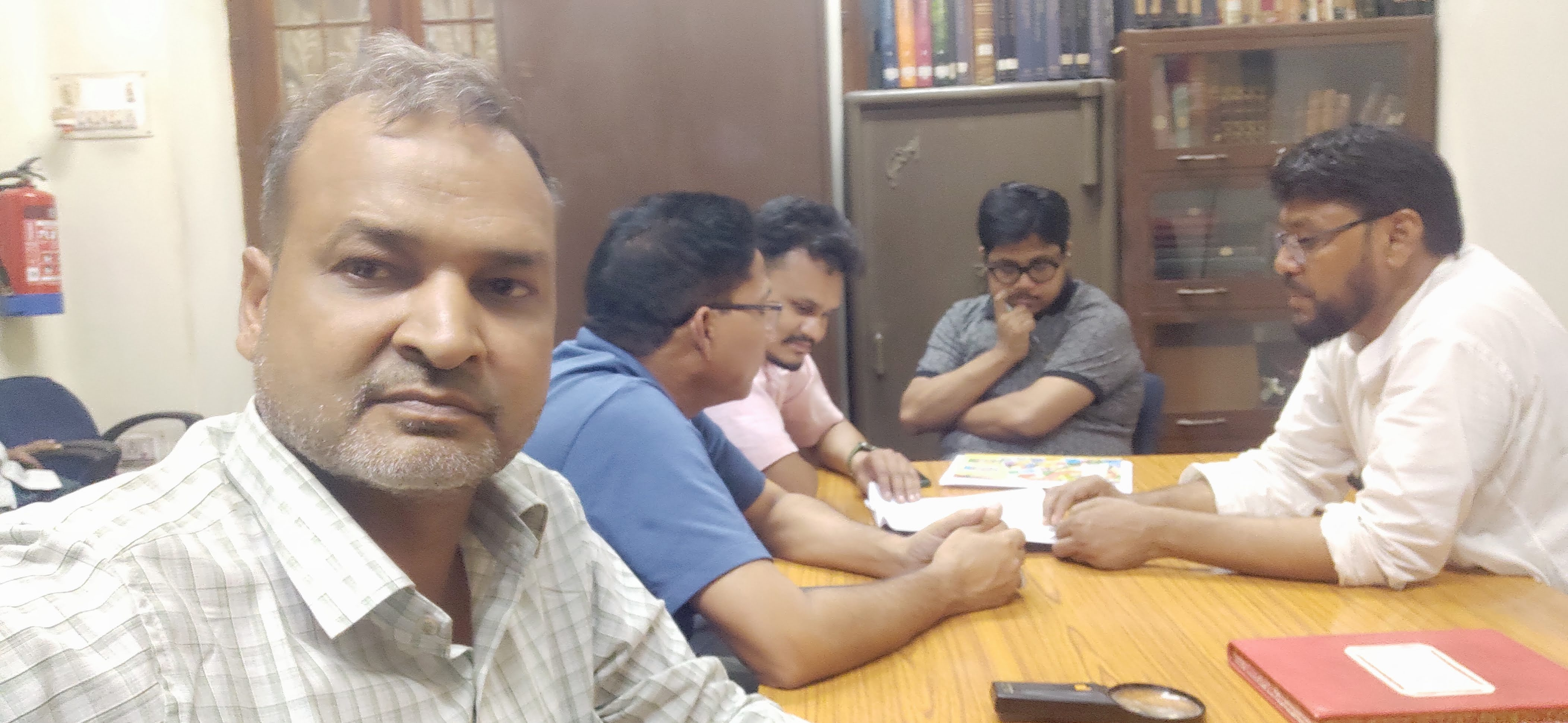
Rarities Viewing Room of Khuda Bakhsh Oriental Library

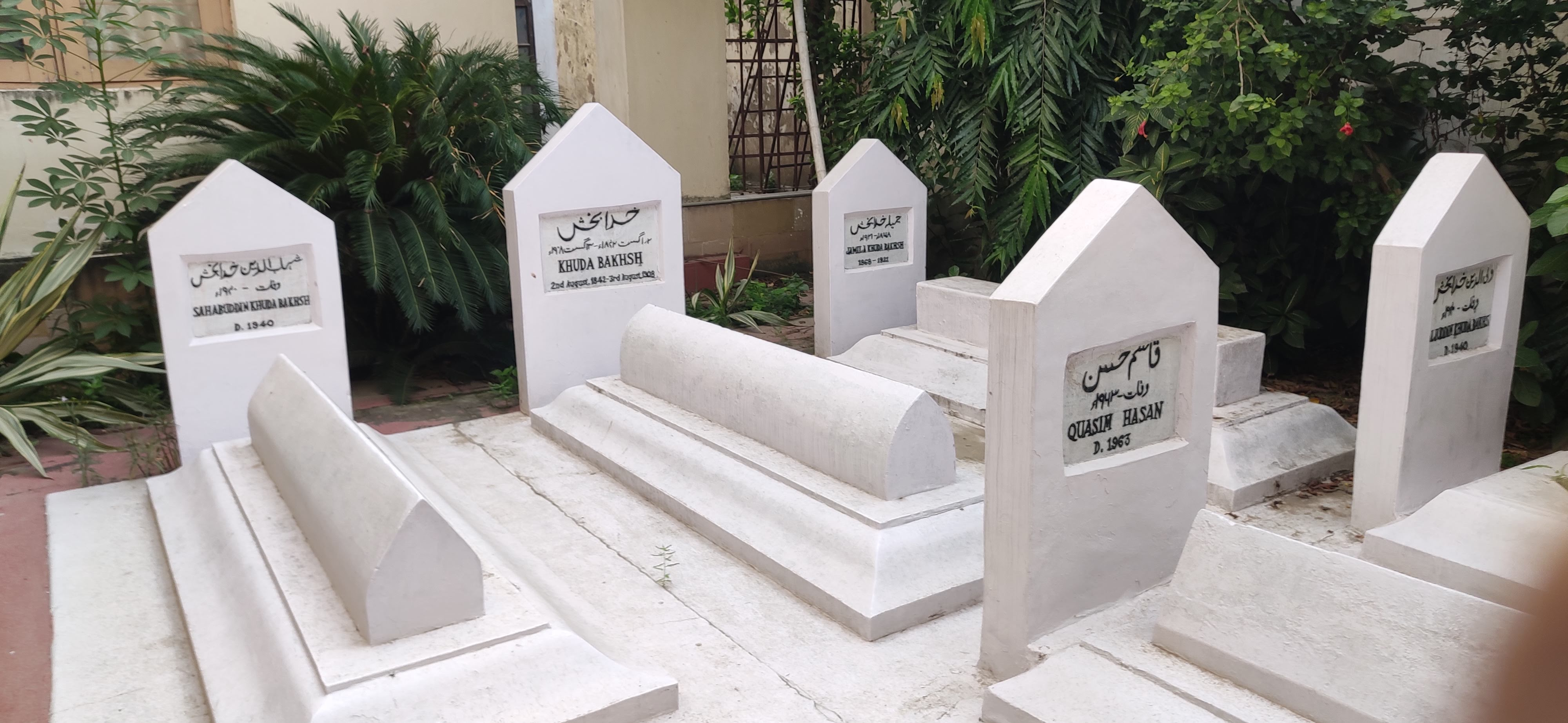
Graves of Khuda Bakhsh and family

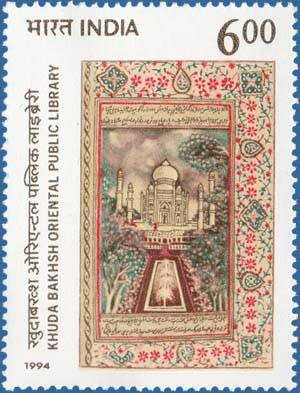
Khuda Bakhsh Oriental Public Library stamp

== See also ==
- Sinha Library
