= S. V. Sohoni =

Dr. Shridhar Vasudev Sohoni (1914–2002) was an eminent scholar of Sanskrit, and a noted antiquarian and numismatist. He was an officer in the Indian Civil Service (British India), and later in his career served as the Chief Secretary of Bihar, Lokayukta of Bihar, and the Vice-Chancellor of Lalit Narayan Mithila University and Tilak Maharashtra University. As a scholar, he published extensively and authored and edited several books and essays on a variety of subjects, including archaeology, architecture, Buddhism, literature, music, Sanskrit, sculpture, and administration. Dr. S.V. Sohoni was honoured with many awards and a festscrift recognised him as one of the founders of the Academy of Indian Numismatics and Sigillography. A festschrift celebrating his Sanskrit scholarship had already been published a decade earlier. He was conferred D.Litt. degrees by four institutions, University of Delhi, Vikram University, Lalit Narayan Mithila University, and Nalanda University. Dr. Sohoni was serving on the Regulating Council of the Bhandarkar Oriental Research Institute when he died.

== Biography ==
Shridhar Vasudev Sohoni was born in a Chitpavan Brahmin family in Agargule in Ratnagiri district. His father was well-acquainted with the Persian language. He grew up in Bombay and attended the Robert Cotton Money School. He studied for a B.A. in Economics at the University of Bombay, and studied Indo-Greek and Gupta history under Father Henry Heras. In 1934, he received his B.A. and in 1936, his M.A. in Economics and History and passed the examinations with a Distinction in First Class (having won the Kanade Prize, Bai Dayakonwar Brijbhukhandas scholarship, K.T. Telang Gold Medial, Sir Pherozeshah Mehta scholarship, Sir Lawrence Jenkins scholarship, among others). He then passed the Indian Civil Service examination and went on to study at the University of Cambridge. In 1937, he was elected a Fellow of the Royal Numismatic Society. Sohoni returned to India in 1938 and served as district collector in various locations in Bihar and Orissa. In the aftermath of partition and independence, he was charged with negotiating with various princely states in Orissa. He played a very important role in ensuring that the Khuda Bakhsh Oriental Library was retained in India after partition.

Between 1964 and 1966, he was appointed the Honorary Vice-chancellor of Kameshwar Singh Darbhanga Sanskrit University, and was later the chairman of the World Buddhist Conference in Bodhgaya in 1972. In 1973 he was appointed the Lokayukta of Bihar, and was appointed to various committees and commissions.Sanskrit, Prakrit, Pali, English, Marathi, Hindi, and Gujarati were the languages in which he was fluent. His scholarship in Sanskrit was praised by Dr. Vasudev Vishnu Mirashi, who called him " a critical and imaginative researcher of Sanskrit literature and ancient Indian history." Dr. S.V. Sohoni's name appears in hundreds of publications in most unexpected places, as seen in the chapter on South Asian cartography in the Historical Mapping section of The History of Cartography (eds. J.B. Harley and David Woodward). His numismatic expertise has been described by Mr. Sanjay Godbole, when he explained how just feeling a coin was enough for him to recognise a fake. He was the chief editor of the Journal of Bihar Research Society and founder editor of Indian Numismatic Chronicle, also having served as the President of the Bihar Research Society, and Chairman of the Government of Uttar Pradesh Coin Committee from 1974 to 1977.

== Personal life ==
Shridhar V. Sohoni married Nirmaladevi Taisaheb Ghorpade, of the royal family of Ichalkaranji state. He had two sons, Dr. Venkatrao Sohoni, who graduated from the Indian Institute of Technology (IIT), Kharagpur with a degree in electronics engineering (1963) and at IIT, Mumbai in 1972 with a PhD in information systems. He married the writer Neera Kuckreja Sohoni. His second son Shrinivas Sohoni entered the Indian Administrative Service in 1970, was the Secretary-General of the Rajya Sabha and retired as Secretary to the President of India. His daughter, Dr. Vineeta Deshmukh, nee Padmaja Sohoni, studied at Patna University (B.A. Literature) and Delhi University (M.A., Literature), and was a Professor of English at the S.N.D.T. University in Mumbai. She was the first person in India to earn a Ph.D. in Linguistics focused on the teaching of English Language for Vocational Studies in the context of ESL in India.

== Bibliography ==
=== Books ===
- Sohoni, S.V. (1951). Ceylon, Burma, China and Russia. Poona.
- Sohoni, S.V. (1962). Maharajadhiraj Dr. Kameshwara Singh memorial vol. 1. Vol. Journal of the Bihar Research Society, 48. Bihar Research Society.
- Sohoni, S.V. (1963). Maharajadhiraj Dr. Kameshwara Singh memorial vol. 2. Vol. Journal of the Bihar Research Society, 49. Bihar Research Society.
- Sohoni, S.V. (1968). Prof. Syed Hasan Askari felicitation volume. Patna: Bihar Research Society.
- Kalzang, Washul Tulku Thubten; Pasadika, Bhikku; Sohoni, S.V. (1971). Excerpts from the Śūraṅgama samādhi sūtra : Ḥphag-pa-dpaḥ-bar-ḥgro-baḥi-tiṅ-ṅe-ḥdzin-ces-bya-ba-theg-pa-chen-poḥi-mdo. Patna: Bihar Research Society.
- Mahanama; Sohoni, S.V. (1971). Vaṃsatthappakāsinī, nāma, Mahāvaṃsaṭīka. Patna: Nava Nālandā Mahāvihāra.
- Sohoni, S.V. (1977). Bāṇajayantī-nibandhāvalī : Bihāra-Rājya-Śikṣā-Vibhāgena saṇghaṭitayā samityā rājyasāhāyyena samāyojite, 1966 Khrīstābde, Mahākavibāṇabhaṭṭa-jayantī-samārohāvasare prāptānāṃ nibandhānāṃ saṅgraharūpā. Vol. Mithilā Vidyāpīṭha granthamālā : Arvācīnagranthāvalau, 5. Darbhanga: Mithilāvidyāpīṭha.
- Sohoni, S.V (1984). The Ombudsman in India. Ahmedabad: Harold Laski Institute of Political Science.

=== Essays ===
- Sohoni, S. V. 'A note on Audumbara temple coins' in Journal of the Numismatic Society of India 4 (1942): 55ff.
- Sohoni, S. V. 'Classical Concepts of Prthvi' in Journal of Bihar Research Society 51 (1965): 79–85.
- Sohoni, S. V. 'Notes and Queries on Bhitari Pillar Inscription of Skandagupta' in Journal of the Burma Research Society (1969): 100.
- Sohoni, S. V. 'Epigraphia Miscellanea' in Journal of Bihar research Society 42 (1975): 1–4.
- Sohoni, S. V. 'Kalidāsa's Description of Vidiśā and its Environs,' Journal of the Bihar Research Society 59, part I-V (1973): 39-58.
- Sohoni, S. V. 'On Vishakhadatta's Devicandragupta' in Annals of the Bhandarkar Oriental Research Institute 62.1/4 (1981): 169–192.
- Sohoni, S. V. 'Kalidasa and the Geography of Central Tibet' in Annals of the Bhandarkar Oriental Research Institute 63.1/4 (1982): 121–156.
- Sohoni, S. V., and G. H. Taralekar. 'Fragments of Panditaraja Jagannatha's commentary on Kavyaprakasa' in Annals of the Bhandarkar Oriental Research Institute 67.1/4 (1986): 317–328.
- Sohoni, S. V. 'Lokasamayakriyanuvidhana' in Annals of the Bhandarkar Oriental Research Institute 68.1/4 (1987): 269–279.
- Sohoni, S. V. 'Historical background of iron industry in Malwa of Bhoja's period.' Social Science 10 (1990): 104.
- Sohoni, S. V. 'Shyamala's Last Curiosity' in Annals of the Bhandarkar Oriental Research Institute 71.1/4 (1990): 185–193.
- Sohoni, S. V. 'In Defence of Mayura and Bana' in Bulletin of the Deccan College Research Institute 53 (1993): 349–355.
