= Mabeyn-i hümayun =

Secretariat of the Ottoman sultan

Mâbeyn-i Hümâyûn (Ottoman Turkish: مابين همايون), sometimes expanded as Mabeyn-i Hümayun-ı Cenab-ı Mülukane (Ottoman Turkish: مابين همايون جناب ملوکانه) was the secretariat and primary administrative office of the Ottoman sultan, functioning as a central institution within the imperial palace. It served as the sultan's personal working space, handling state correspondence, petitions, decrees and receptions, effectively acting as a bridge between the private (harem) and public (selamlık) sections of the palace.

== Etymology and Physical Role ==
The term mâbeyn (from Arabic, meaning "in between" or "intermediate space") originally referred to the architectural or spatial area connecting the Harem-i Hümayun (the sultan's private family quarters) and the selamlık (public/male reception areas). This intermediary zone prevented direct contact between unrelated men and harem residents while serving practical purposes. Over time, it evolved into the sultan's official workspace for governance, receptions, rest, entertainment and daily affairs.

In palaces such as Topkapı, Dolmabahçe and Beylerbeyi, the Mabeyn-i Hümayun included suites for diplomatic meetings, ambassador receptions and state ceremonies. In later palaces like Dolmabahçe, it formed a prominent section alongside the central Muayede (ceremonial) hall and the harem.

== Historical Development ==
The physical space existed by the late 17th century (attested as early as 1675), but the organized office and staff of mâbeyincis (chamberlains/secretaries) became prominent in the 18th century.

- Early Period: Under Sultan Mustafa II (r. 1695–1703), reforms shifted certain duties (e.g., telhis reports and hatt-ı hümayun decrees) to silahtars and Has Oda personnel, laying groundwork for a palace secretariat.
- 18th Century: During the reigns of Abdul Hamid I (r. 1774–1789) and Selim III (r. 1789–1807), the hünkâr sofası (imperial sofa) in Topkapı was designated as the Mabeyn. It handled petitions (arzuhal), receptions, and daily governance.
- Tanzimat Era: Mahmud II (r. 1808–1839) restructured the palace bureaucracy, establishing the Mabeyn Müşirliği (a supervisory office) and transforming the Sır Kâtibi (Private Secretary) into the Mabeyn Başkâtibi (Chief Secretary). This strengthened direct sultanic control amid the rise of the Sublime Porte (Bab-ı Ali).
- Hamidian Era: The Mabeyn reached its peak influence during the reign of Abdul Hamid II (r. 1876–1909). With power centralized in Yıldız Palace, it operated as a parallel (and often dominant) administrative center to the government. It expanded significantly in staff and functions, including a cipher office for direct communication with provincial officials, bypassing traditional channels. The institution managed foreign policy, internal security, and patronage networks.

== Organization and Staff ==
The Mabeyn was divided into private (hususi) and official (resmi) sections. Key roles included:

- Mabeyn Başkâtibi (Chief Secretary) — Oversaw correspondence.
- İkinci Katib (Second Secretary) — Prominent figures like Ahmad Izzat Pasha al-Abid.
- Mabeyincis (Chamberlains), kurenâ (confidants), yâvers (aides-de-camp), and specialists (e.g., translators, cipher clerks).
- Other officials: Silahtar, çuhadar, kapıcılar, and various household servants.

By the late 19th century, staff numbers grew substantially (reaching hundreds, including honorary aides under Abdul Hamid II). After the 1908 Young Turk Revolution, its power diminished with the restoration of constitutional government, though it persisted until the abolition of the sultanate.

Notable figures associated with the Mabeyn include Tahsin Pasha (Chief Secretary to Abdul Hamid II), Halid Ziya Uşaklıgil, and Mehmed Said Pasha.

== Significance ==
The Mabeyn-i Hümayun symbolized the personalization of Ottoman rule. As the Divan-ı Hümayun and grand vizierate lost centrality, the Mabeyn allowed sultans—particularly in the 19th century—to exercise direct authority. It reflected the empire's modernization efforts while maintaining traditional palace hierarchies and rituals. Its archives and operations provide key insights into late Ottoman decision-making.

== Legacy ==
After the Ottoman Empire's dissolution, the physical Mabeyn sections in surviving palaces (now museums) continue to illustrate 19th-century Ottoman architecture and court life. Scholarly works, such as Ali Akyıldız's comprehensive study Mabeyn-i Hümayun: Osmanlı Saray Teşkilatının Modernleşmesi, have illuminated its institutional history.

== List of secretaries ==
- Tahsin Pasha, Chief Secretary of Abdul Hamid II from 1894 to 1908.
- Ahmad Izzat Pasha al-Abid, Second Secretary of Abdul Hamid II from 1895 to 1908.
- Mehmed Said Pasha, Chief Secretary of Abdul Hamid II from 1876 to 1878.
- Halid Ziya Bey, Chief Secretary of Mehmed V from 1909 to 1912.
