= Abid Ali =

Abid Ali (Arabic: عبد علي) is a masculine given name and surname of Arabic origin. Notable people with the name include:

== Given name ==
- Abid Ali (actor) (1952–2019), Pakistani television actor
- Abid Ali (cricketer) (born 1987), Pakistani international cricketer
- Abid Ali (Indian National Army) (1911–1984), Indian Army officer
- Abid Ali (politician) (1935–2001), Bangladeshi politician
- Abid Ali Abid (1906–1971), Pakistani critic, poet, and educator
- Abid Ali Akbar (born 1990), Pakistani tennis player
- Abid Ali Jaferbhai (1899–1973), Indian politician
- Abid Ali Kazi (born 1961), Pakistani cricket statistician and historian
- Abid Ali Nazish (1972–2012), Pakistani actor

== Surname ==
- Ahmad Abid Ali (born 1986), Iraqi footballer
- Syed Abid Ali (1941–2025), Indian cricketer

== See also ==
- Abid (name)
- Ali (name)
