= Henry Heras =

Spanish Jesuit priest, archeologist and historian in India

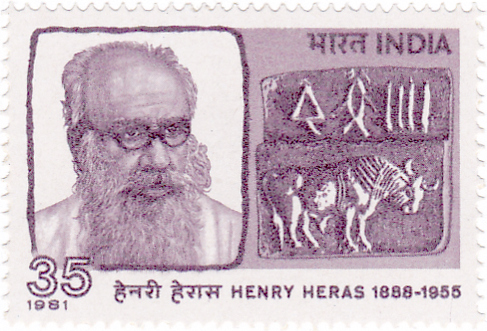
Heras and a Mohenjo-Daro tablet on a 1981 stamp of India

Enric Heras de Sicars, known by his anglicised name Henry Heras (11 September 1888, Barcelona, Spain – 14 December 1955, Bombay, India), was a Spanish-Indian Jesuit priest, archeologist and historian based in India.

== Education ==
Enric was the heir of a well-off rural household from the village of Canet d'Adri, near Girona, in Catalonia. His parents were Ponç Heras and Maria Sicars. The Heras family had been established in the property of Adri since the late thirteenth century, but Enric gave up his rights in order to follow his religious vocation. After becoming a Jesuit in 1904, Heras followed the usual course of Jesuit priestly formation: three years of philosophy in Tortosa, three years of teaching history in Orihuela, Alacant, Spain, and the theological course in Sarrià, Barcelona, at the end of which he was ordained a Catholic priest in 1920.

== Historian in India ==
On arrival in British India in 1922, he was appointed to teach history at St Xavier's College, Bombay. He chose to teach Indian history "because he wanted to study it". This became his favorite subject and field of competence. He wrote a short book on historical methodology, The Writing of History, which became compulsory reading for his students.

He founded the Indian Historical Research Institute (1926), which trained numerous historians and Indologists, including Dr. George M. Moraes, Dr. Liladhar B. Keny, Dr. B. A. Saletore and others. The institute was later renamed the Heras Institute of Indian History and Culture. The Heras Memorial Lecture is held annually at the institute.

== Proto-historian and archeologist ==
From 1935 on he turned his attention to the newly excavated archeological sites of Mohenjo-Daro and Harappa: he was particularly keen on deciphering the inscriptions of the Indus Valley Civilisation. He wrote numerous articles on the topic, summing up finally his research in what will remain his master piece: Studies in Proto-Indo-Mediterranean Culture (1953) in which he proposed a solution to the mysterious script of Mohenjo-Daro, and established cultural links between the Indus Valley Civilization, the Sumerian-Egyptian civilization and the ancient Mediterranean cultures. Though the deciphering he proposed is not yet fully convincing, it is "gaining ever greater acceptance by the specialists". Although, fellow Jesuits in India, like father George Gispert (i.e. Jordi Gispert-Saüch) have expressed that his paramount work was his book on Vijayanagar.

== Other activities and achievements ==
Heras was also the founder of the Bombay Historical Society and was also actively involved in the Indian Historical Records Commission, Indian History Congress and the International Congress of Historical Sciences. Being totally identified with the culture of the country he chose to become an Indian citizen as soon as possible after the independence of 1947. Among his many students is Dr. S.V. Sohoni, who studied under him in the early twentieth century.

The same admiration for Indian culture led him to encourage Christian artists to adopt Indian forms of art and symbols in order to express Christian themes. In painting he enthused over Angelo Fonseca, Olimpio Coleto Rodrigues, et al. In architecture he was personally involved in drawing up the plans of the cathedral of Belgaum. He conducted an exhibition on Indian Christian art for the Holy Year of 1950 in Rome. He is acknowledged to be the "Father of Christian Indian Art".

== Selected works ==
- The Writing of History, Madras, 1926.
- The Aravidu Dynasty of Vijayanagara, Madras, 1927.
- Beginning of Vijayanagara History, Bombay, 1929.
- The Conversion Policy of the Jesuits in India, Bombay, 1933.
- Studies in Pallava History, Madras, 1933.
- Studies in Proto-Indo-Mediterranean Culture, 1955.

== Bibliography ==
- Correia-Afonso, J. (ed). Henry Heras, the Scholar and his Work, Bombay, 1976.
- Balaguer, Melchior. Fr Henry Heras (1888–1955), in Jesuits in India: in Historical Perspective, Macao, 1992, pp. 297–300.
