= Abed Mahfouz =

Lebanese fashion designer (born 1956)

- Born: 1 December 1956 (age 69); Beirut
- Occupation: Fashion designer
- Website: abedmahfouz.com

Abed Mahfouz (Arabic: عبد محفوظ) (born December 1, 1956) is a Lebanese fashion designer.

== Personal life ==
He was raised in a modest family in Lebanon and surrounded with family members who worked in tailoring.

== Career ==
Mahfouz opened his first bridal boutique in 1985 with his sister in Beirut, Lebanon. After the success of that tailoring workshop, Mahfouz started designing and drawing semi-complete couture collections in April 1990.

In June 1999, Mahfouz launched his first fashion show in which he showcased a complete collection of wedding gowns at the Royal Plaza Hotel in Beirut. The official launch of the Abed Mahfouz Bridal line Dreamer was during the spring/summer fashion season in June 2001. The line was launched through a fashion show at the Phoenicia Intercontinental.

The brand's major turning point was the official launch of the Abed Mahfouz Couture line during Alta Roma Fashion Week in Rome, Italy October 2002. In February 2010, Mahfouz debuted his first ready-to-wear collection during New York Fashion Week.
