= Abid Anwar (poet) =

Bangladeshi writer

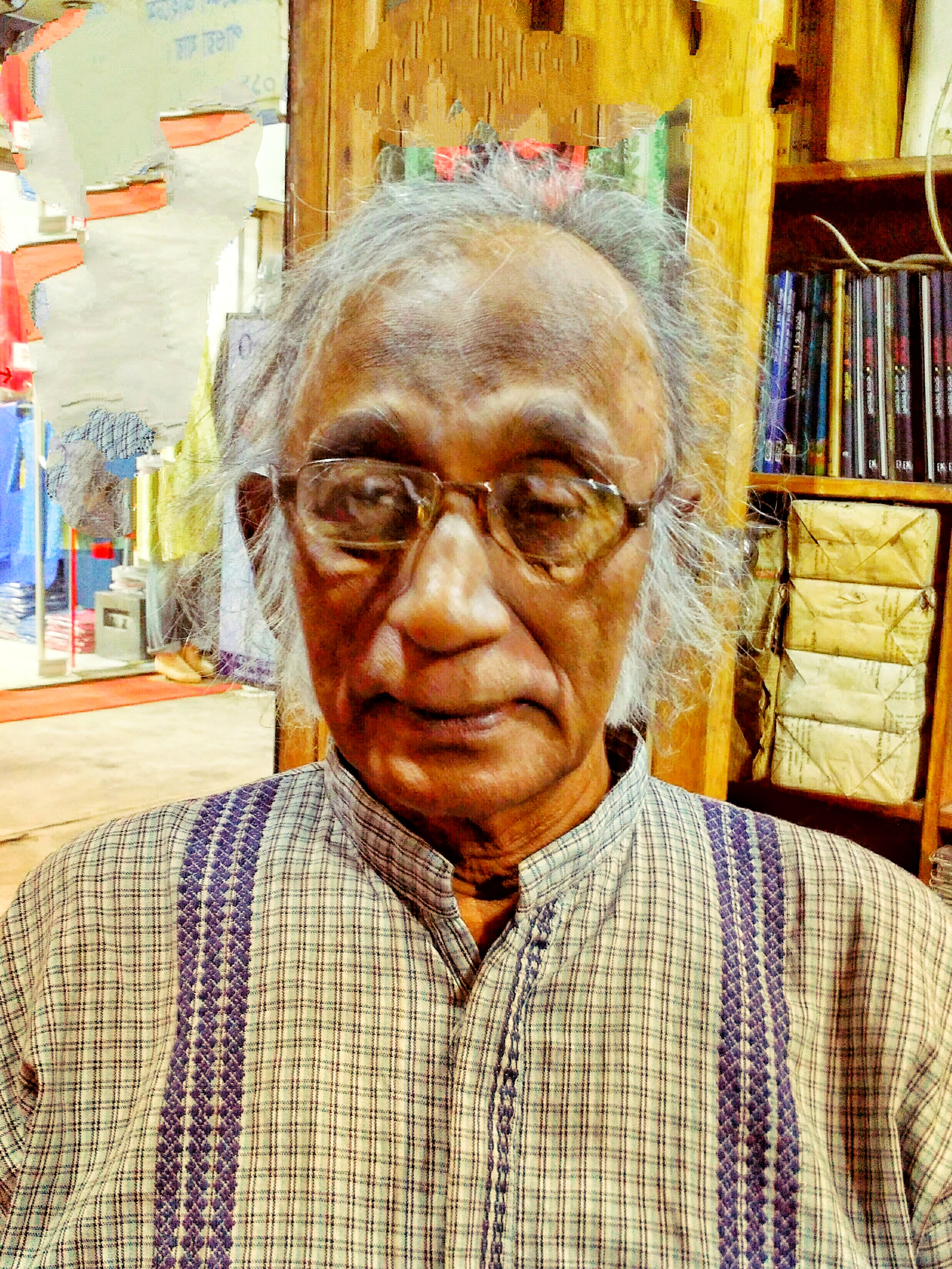
- Anwar in 2018
- Occupation: Poet
- Awards: Bangla Academy Literary Award

Abid Anwar is a Bangladeshi poet, critic, and lyricist. For his contributions to Bengali poetry, he was awarded the Bangla Academy Literary Award in 2012.
