= Shireen Abed =

- Medical career
- Field: pediatrics neonatology
- Institutions: Nasser Hospital

Shireen Abed (Arabic: شيرين عابد, romanized: Shīrīn ʻĀbid) is a Palestinian pediatrician and neonatal specialist who has worked as head of Al-Shifa's neonatal unit.

== Biography ==
Abed was head of the neonatal intensive care unit at al-Nasser Hospital in Gaza, and has also worked as director of the maternity center in the Al-Shifa Medical Complex.

In 2021, Abed contributed to World Health Organization (WHO) funded research on the quality of Early Essential Newborn Care (EENC) introduced into public maternity hospitals by the Ministry of Health in Gaza. Other research includes exploring the impact of armed conflict on maternal and neonatal health and birth weight in the Gaza Strip.

Abed was displaced when her flat was bombed after the start of the Gaza war in 2023. She has continued to work delivering babies and caring for children in displacement camps in the Gaza Strip. She also established emergency protocols to provide life-saving treatments to babies despite limited resources.

She was named a BBC 100 Woman in 2024.
