= Abid Ali Abid =

Pakistani poet

- Born: September 17, 1906; Dera Ismail Khan, British India
- Died: January 20, 1971 (aged 64); Lahore, Pakistan
- Occupations: Poet, Educator
- Writing career
- Language: Urdu, Persian
- Notable works: Talismaat, Shahbaz Khan, Main Kabhi Ghazal na Kahta, Usool-E-Intequade-Adabiyat, Shar-i-Iqbal

Abid Ali Abid (Urdu/Persian: سید عابد علی عابد) was a Pakistani Urdu and Persian poet and educator who was born on 17 September 1906 in Dera Ismail Khan, British India and died in Lahore, Pakistan on 20 January 1971.

== Life ==
He wrote books on literary criticism in Urdu and Persian and "it was his criticism that earned him a place of distinction." His works include Usool-e-Inteqaad, Adab Ke Asloob, Shama, Yad-e-Baiza, Suhaag, Talmihaat-e-Iqbal, Tilasmaat, Main Kabhi Ghazal Na Kehta, Baresham Ood, and Inteqaad.

He also initiated and edited several literary journals, including Sahifa-Lahore. He was one of the initial drama and feature writers at the newly established Radio Pakistan Lahore in the late 1940s and 1950s. He survived three heart attacks but succumbed to the fourth in 1971.

== Selected work ==
- Story writing of films like the first talkie, Heer Ranjha (1931)

== Books ==
- Talismaat (The Magic), Urdu fiction, Hashmi Book Depot Lahore, Pakistan
- Shahbaz Khan, Urdu fiction, ISBN 969-35-0721-5, Sang-e-Meel Publications, Pakistan
- Main Kabhi Ghazal na Kahta, Urdu poetry, ISBN 969-35-0181-0, Sang-e-Meel Publications, Pakistan
- Usool-E-Intequade-Adabiyat (Rules of Literary Criticism)
- Shar-i-Iqbal, (A criticism of Iqbal's Poetry), ISBN 969-35-1436-X / 969351436X, Sang-e-Meel Publications, Pakistan
- Political Theory of the Shi'ties, Part of the history of Muslim philosophy.
- Asloob, an Urdu book on literary criticism
- Albayan, an Urdu book on literary criticism
- Al Badeeh (Mohsinaat e Shairi Ka Intaqadi Jaiza): (Criticism of the Characteristics of Urdu poetry)
