= Abid Lashari =

Pakistani disability rights activist and social worker

- Born: Nawabshah, Sindh, Pakistan
- Citizenship: Pakistan
- Occupation: Disability rights activist
- Organization: National Disability & Development Forum (NDF Pakistan)
- Known for: Disability rights advocacy
- Website: abidlashari.com

Abid Lashari is a Pakistani disability rights activist and social worker. He is the founder and president of the National Disability & Development Forum (NDF Pakistan), a non-profit organization working in the field of disability rehabilitation and inclusive development in Pakistan.

== Early life ==
Lashari lost both hands in a childhood fire incident. He later continued his education and became involved in disability advocacy and rehabilitation work in Sindh.

== Career ==
Lashari began working with the Sind Disabled Welfare Organisation as a volunteer in 1999 and later became its secretary-general. He founded the National Disability and Development Forum (NDF) in 2005 in his hometown in present-day Benazirabad District, Sindh.

In 2018, NDF partnered with the Benazir Income Support Programme on a rehabilitation initiative for children with disabilities.

== Recognition ==
In May 2026, Lashari received the Tamgha-i-Imtiaz, a Pakistani civil award.
