= Abid Riaz Qureshi =

American attorney

Abid Qureshi
- Born: Pakistan
- Education: Cornell University (BA); Harvard University (JD)

Abid Riaz Qureshi is an American attorney. He is a partner in the Washington, D.C. office of the law firm Latham & Watkins. Qureshi is a former nominee to be a United States district judge of the United States District Court for the District of Columbia.

== Early life and education ==
Qureshi was born in Pakistan. He earned a Bachelor of Arts summa cum laude in 1993 from Cornell University. He received a Juris Doctor cum laude in 1997 from Harvard Law School.

== Career ==
Qureshi has spent his legal career in the Washington, D.C. office of the law firm Latham & Watkins, where he specializes in cases involving the False Claims Act, health-care fraud, and securities violations. He became a partner at the firm in 2006. He currently is the global chair of the firm's Pro Bono Committee, a position he has held since 2012. From 2006 to 2011, he was Co-Chair of the Litigation Department in the Washington, D.C., office. Qureshi has served on Legal Ethics Committee of the District of Columbia Bar since 2015.

== Expired nomination to district court ==
On September 6, 2016, President Obama nominated Qureshi to be a judge of the United States District Court for the District of Columbia, to the seat vacated by Judge Rosemary M. Collyer, who took senior status on May 18, 2016. His nomination expired on January 3, 2017, with the end of the 114th Congress. Qureshi is the first Muslim nominated to a federal judgeship. The distinction of first Muslim federal judge ultimately went to Amir Ali in 2024, in the same district court.
