= Pépé Abed =

Adventurer, explorer, entrepreneur

Youssef Gergi Abed (1911 – December 2006), also known as Pépé Abed, was a Lebanese businessman and amateur diver. He was active in Lebanon's tourism and hospitality sectors during the mid-20th century and is known for founding several leisure establishments, particularly in the coastal town of Byblos.

== Early life ==
Abed was born in 1911 in Rmeil, Lebanon. He spent part of his early life in Mexico before returning to Lebanon in the early 1950s, where he worked as a jeweler.

== Career ==
Abed was involved in the development of several hospitality and tourism ventures in Lebanon. His projects included the Acapulco Beach Club in Jnah, the Bacchus Hotel and nightclub in Beirut, the Admiral's Club in Tyre, the Hacienda in Amshit, and the Byblos Fishing Club, which also served as his residence.

In 1962, he opened the Pépé Abed Museum next to the Byblos Fishing Club. The museum houses a collection of artifacts, including items of Greek, Roman, and Phoenician origin, which Abed reportedly recovered while diving. The museum has at times been described as operating with oversight or recognition from UNESCO.

The Byblos Fishing Club was visited by various public figures over the years, including artists, actors, and political leaders. Notable visitors reportedly included Anita Ekberg, Johnny Hallyday, Kim Novak, Ginger Rogers, Ann-Margret, Said Akl, Václav Havel, Miguel Alemán Valdés, and Camille Chamoun.

Abed also converted a group of seaside caves in Byblos into a restaurant offering local Lebanese cuisine.
