= Abid Hussain Ansari =

Indian Politician,Businessman

- عابد حسين أنصاري
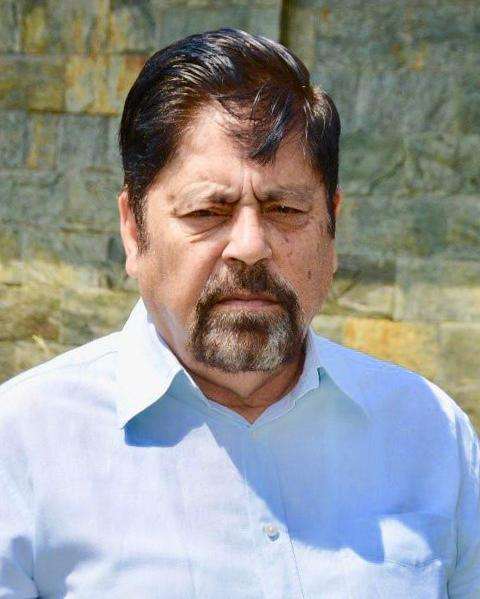

Member of the Jammu and Kashmir Legislative Assembly
- In office 2014–2018
- Constituency: Zadibal, Srinagar, Kashmir

Personal details
- Born: 27 October 1946 (age 79) Srinagar, Jammu and Kashmir, India
- Party: Jammu and Kashmir People's Conference
- Other political affiliations: General secretary, All Jammu and Kashmir Shia Association, Vice President Jammu and Kashmir People’s Conference
- Children: Kumail Hussain Ansari and a Daughter

Abid Hussain Ansari (Kashmiri: عابد حسين أنصاري) is an Indian politician and businessman from Jammu and Kashmir. He was a former member of Jammu and Kashmir's Legislative Assembly from Zadibal Assembly constituency representing Jammu and Kashmir People's Democratic Party.

== Early life and education ==
Ansari is from Qamarwari, Srinagar district, Jammu and Kashmir. He is the son of Mohammad Jawad Ansari. He passed Class 10 from Government Boys School, Nawa Kadal, Srinagar.

== Career ==
Ansari won from Zadibal Assembly constituency representing the Jammu and Kashmir Peoples Democratic Party in the 2014 Jammu and Kashmir Legislative Assembly election. He was nominated by JKPDP, after the death of his Brother Iftikhar Hussain Ansari in 2014. In December 2018, He left the JKPDP. He joined Jammu and Kashmir People's Conference. He is also the general secretary of All Jammu and Kashmir Shia Association. He was appointed the Vice President of the Jammu and Kashmir People’s Conference in 2024. He lost the assembly elections from Zadibal constituency in 2024 elections. His covering candidate was his nephew, and Vice President All Jammu and Kashmir Shia Association, Irfan Raza Ansari.
