= Hawlu Pasha al-Abid =

Ottoman administrator (1824–1895)

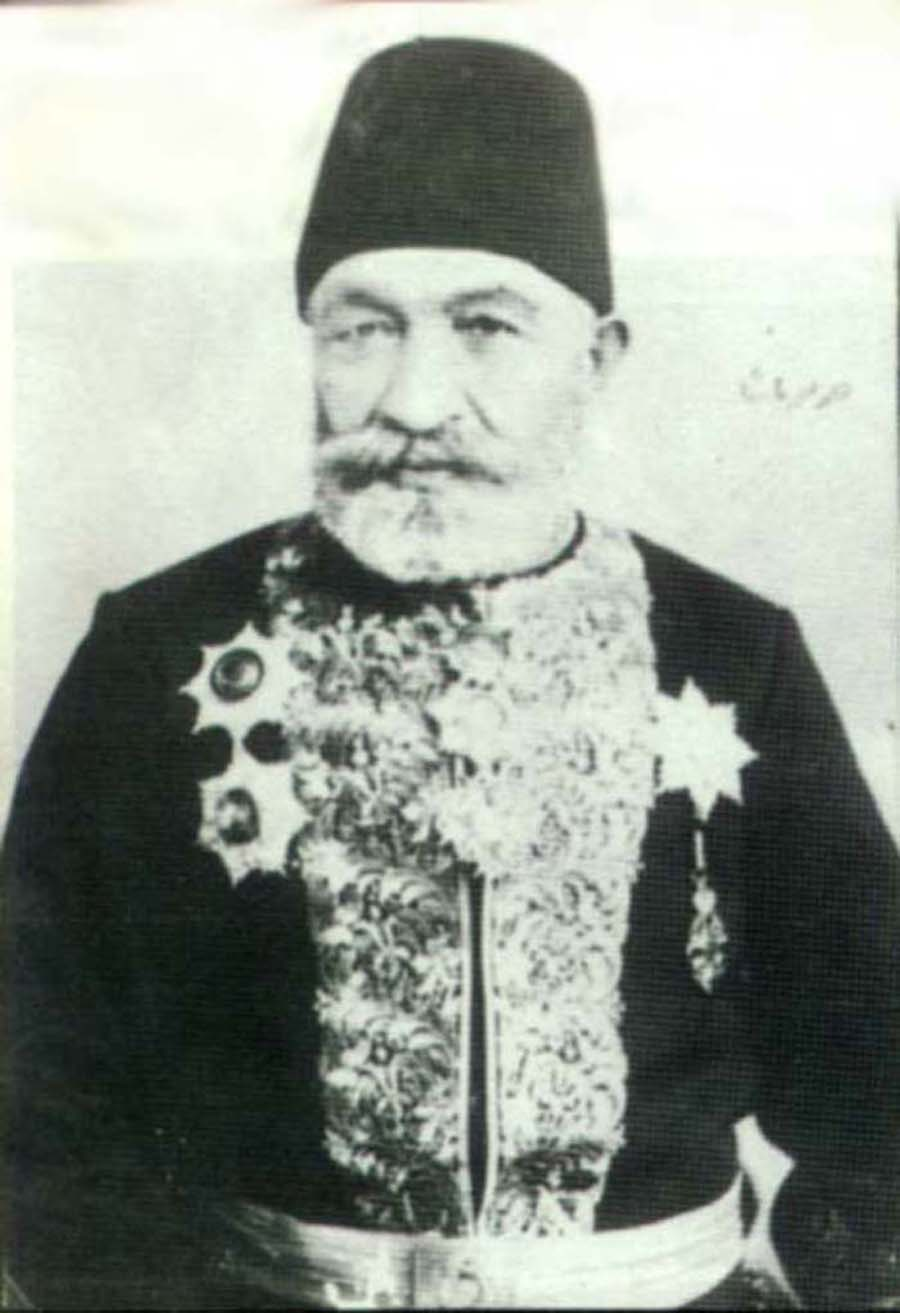
Hawlu Pasha al-Abid (1824–1895)

Hawlu Pasha al-Abid (Arabic: هولو باشا العابد, romanized: Hawlū Bāshā al-ʻĀbid; Turkish: Holo (Note: Holo (instead of Hevlu) is a transcription of the Syrian pronunciation of the name هولو (Hawlū).) Paşa el-Abid or Abidzade Holo Paşa; 1824–1895) was a prominent Syrian administrator during the reign of Ottoman Sultan Abdulaziz. He was descended from the Syrian Mawālī Bedouins.

Quoting Johann Büssow, "He had a distinguished military and administrative career in the service of the Ottoman state and managed to establish himself and some of his sons among the leading notables of Damascus. Between 1863 and 1865 was kaymakam of Nablus, and in 1869 he was the military commander of an expedition to Transjordan. [...] After his service in Nablus, he was promoted to the rank of Mirmiran, and after successfully completing his mission in 1869, Holo Paşa, together with Kamil Paşa, the governor of Jerusalem, received medals from the Austrian emperor and the Shah of Iran."

He was also named qa'im maqam of the Biqa' (when Richard Francis Burton was consul at Damascus), then mutasarrif of several districts of the Damascene, before becoming president of the administrative council of Damascus Vilayet in 1890.

He was the father of Ahmad Izzat Pasha al-Abid, Second Secretary and confidant of Abdulhamid II, and the grandfather of Muhammad Ali Bay al-Abid, the first president of the mandatory Syrian Republic.
