= Abed Daoudieh =

Jordanian politician (1920–2015)

Abed Khalaf Daoudieh (23 April 1920 – 10 January 2015) was a Jordanian politician. He served as Awqaf and Islamic Affairs minister in 1984. He later served as governor of the governorates of Irbid, Balqa and Ma'an.
