= Intezar Ahmed Abidi =

Indian politician with the Bahujan Samaj Party

Intezar Abidi
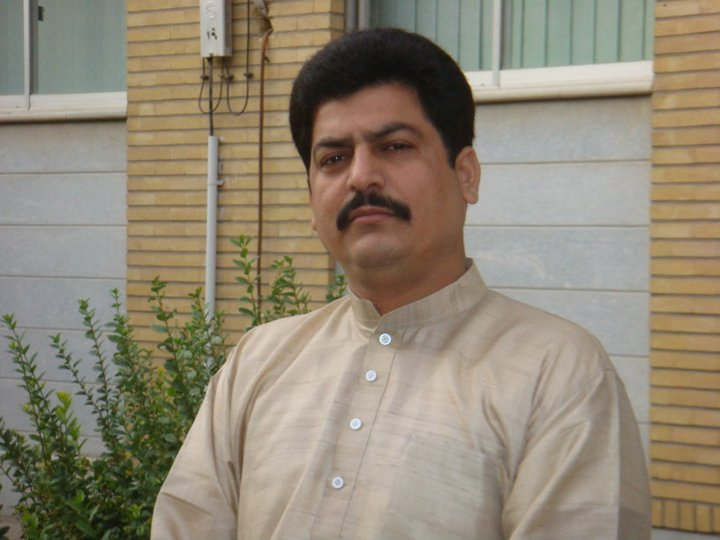
- Intezar Abidi 'Bobby'

Minister, Uttar Pradesh Government
- Leader: Mayawati

Personal details
- Born: July 11, 1976 Bahera Sadat, Fatehpur district, Uttar Pradesh, India
- Party: Bahujan Samaj Party
- Relations: Syed Shahenshah Haider Abidi (relative)
- Education: BSc, LLB (Shia Degree College)
- Occupation: Politician
- Known for: Political activities, legal controversies

Intezar Abidi (born 11 July 1976) is an Indian politician with the Bahujan Samaj Party in Uttar Pradesh. Also known as Bobby, he is accused in many cases involving murder and other charges. Before being arrested in June 2011, he was a member of the state government(MINISTER) cabinet under Mayawati, heading of the UP Kisan Ganna Sansthan, a state body that imparts training to sugarcane growers.

Abidi hails from the Bahera Sadat village of Fatehpur district, and has a BSc and LLB from Shia Degree College. He is closely related with Syed Shahenshah Haider Abidi of Samajwadi Party. In 2009, Abidi and BSP politician Jitendra Singh were identified as leaders in a group of 150 arsonists responsible for attacking and setting fire to the house of UP State Congress chief Rita Bahuguna. Two years later, in March 2011, Abidi was arrested in this case. Shortly thereafter, he was elevated to ministerial status by Mayawati. He is currently a zonal co-ordinator of lucknow and kanpur zone of Bahujan Samaj Party which is a very important post in the political party.
