= Abed Chagar =

Moroccan business leader

CEO of Colorado
- Incumbent
- Assumed office March 2013

Personal details
- Born: 27 July 1968 (age 58) Casablanca, Morocco

Abed Chagar, born in 1968 in Casablanca, is a Moroccan business leader.

== Biography ==
=== Family and education ===
The fifth child in a family of six brothers and sisters, Abed Chagar was attracted to mathematics. In 1987, he obtained his baccalaureate in mathematics and science, with a "Good" mention. He then graduated from the Mohammadia School of Engineering (EMI) in 1992 and from the advanced management program at the Higher Institute of Commerce and Business Administration (ISCAE) in 2002.

=== Professional career ===
At the end of his studies, Abed Chagar was the first engineer from a Moroccan school to join Alcatel, now Nexans. In 2000, he joined the Colorado company as IT and organization director. He became deputy general manager in June 2005 and then deputy managing director in 2011. He was appointed CEO in March 2013.

He is also vice-president of Asmex and president of the Competitiveness Cluster.

Since October 2017, he has been president of the Mohammadia School of Engineers Alumni Association (AIEM), the largest engineering network in Morocco.

In December 2020, he was elected president of the Federation of Chemistry and Parachemistry (FCP).

Abed is a member of the board of directors of the CGEM, and vice-president of GIPSI (Interprofessional Safety and Security Group).

=== Private life ===
Abed is married and father of 3 children.
