= Faisal Raza Abidi =

Pakistani political figure and a senator

Syed Faisal Raza Abidi

Pakistan Senator to the Pakistan Senate
- In office March 2009 – 16 April 2014
- President: Asif Ali Zardari
- Prime Minister: Yusuf Raza Gillani, Raja Pervaiz Ashraf
- Constituency: Sindh

Personal details
- Born: Syed Faisal Raza Abidi Karachi, Sindh, Pakistan
- Other political affiliations: PPP (2008-2013)
- Spouses: Syeda Nida Abidi; Urooj Raza Abidi
- Children: 3
- Education: BA and BBA
- Occupation: Politician, businessman, Journalist
- Profession: Spokesman Voice of Shohada e Pakistan
- Portfolio: Senator

Faisal Raza Abidi (Urdu: فیصل رضاعابدی) is a Pakistani political figure and senator representing the Pakistan People’s Party (PPP) for Sindh Province, from March 2009 to January 2013. He also served as the party president of Karachi Division and held a high-ranking membership of the central committee of the Pakistan Peoples Party (PPP). Famous for his oratory skills, Faisal is also renowned for speaking non-hesitantly against Taliban and its assorted banned terror groups operating in Pakistan on national TV. Politically, he is allied with SIC representing majority Sunni Barelvi sect and MWM representing Shia sect in Pakistan. A businessman by profession, Abidi is also the chief executive officer of the Al-Zulfiqar Group of Companies, Karachi, since 2008.

== Political career ==
Abidi was selected as the president of PPP's Karachi division after 2008's General Election. He made remarkable efforts in reviving activities of Pakistan People's Party in Karachi and enjoyed influence over the metropolis. His popularity was disliked by some elements, consequently he was removed from presidency of Karachi Division. However, in 2011 he was again designated as President of PPP, Karachi Division and resigned from the presidency following an internal party rift in 2012.

In addition to his fire-bend criticism and demand of resignation from the then Chief Justice of Pakistan, Abidi heavily censured the wrong policies of his ruling party and senior leadership. He repeatedly raised voice in favour of security agencies of Pakistan, minorities and all those who were victimized by terrorism.

Since March 2009 to April 2014, Faisal Abidi was an elected member of Senate from Pakistan Peoples Party (PPP) on Sindh quota. He tendered his resignation on demand of his party over differences with the party leadership.

== His arrest ==
In November 2016, former Pakistan Peoples Party (PPP) senator, Faisal Raza Abidi, was arrested by law enforcers over his alleged involvement in sectarian killings in Karachi that took place recently and in the past as well. The police and Rangers, who came in at least 10 vehicles, raided Abidi's residence in New Rizvia Society, which falls in District East, late Friday night. Heavy weapons, including a G-3 rifle and sub-machine guns (SMGs), were also recovered during the half-an-hour long search before he was shifted to an undisclosed location for interrogation. The forensic reports of the recovered weapons suggest that they have not been used in any criminal activity, said the investigation officer of the Patel Para incident, Sardar Ahmed Abbasi. Further examinations of the weapons are also being carried out.

Syeda Nida Abidi, wife of former PPP Senator Syed Faisal Raza Abidi has said her husband is being targeted for raising voice in favour of Pakistan armed forces and security agencies. She has demanded the prime minister and Chief of Army Staff to ensure fair trial of her husband who was arrested from Karachi. Addressing a press talk Syeda Nida Abidi said her husband was being implicated in false cases by the Sindh government. She added that the illegal weapons had no connection with Faisal and he had no link with any banned outfit. She said that despite being a part of PPP in past, Faisal had always been the critic of its wrong policies and he had always raised voice for the country security forces, minorities and all those who had suffered loss in the hands of terrorism. She appealed to the government to provide security to her as well as family of the former Senator Syed Faisal Raza Abidi.

In October 2018, Abidi was arrested and sent to jail in contempt of court. Reportedly Faisal Abidi during an interview with a web-based platform "Naya Pakistan" appeared online in July-2018, mentioned the Chief Justice of Pakistan a "traitor" on the plea of his taking oath under the PCO. Subsequently, the owner and producer of "Naya Pakistan" web channel, were also sent to jail on a judicial remand.

Earlier in 2012 Abidi has also demanded resignation from Iftikhar Muhammad Chaudhry and other judges who were restored under the Provisional Constitutional Order (PCO).

=== Reactions ===
Shia Muslim scholars like Allama Hassan Zafar Naqvi criticized the arrest of Faisal Raza Abidi Al Baqee Organization, based in USA, has appealed for his immediate release. Besides, demonstration staged on 19 October 2018 in Kharadar, the commercial heart of Karachi.

== See also ==
- Abidi
