= Abid Raza Bedar =

Indian writer, librarian and scholar (1936 - 2025)

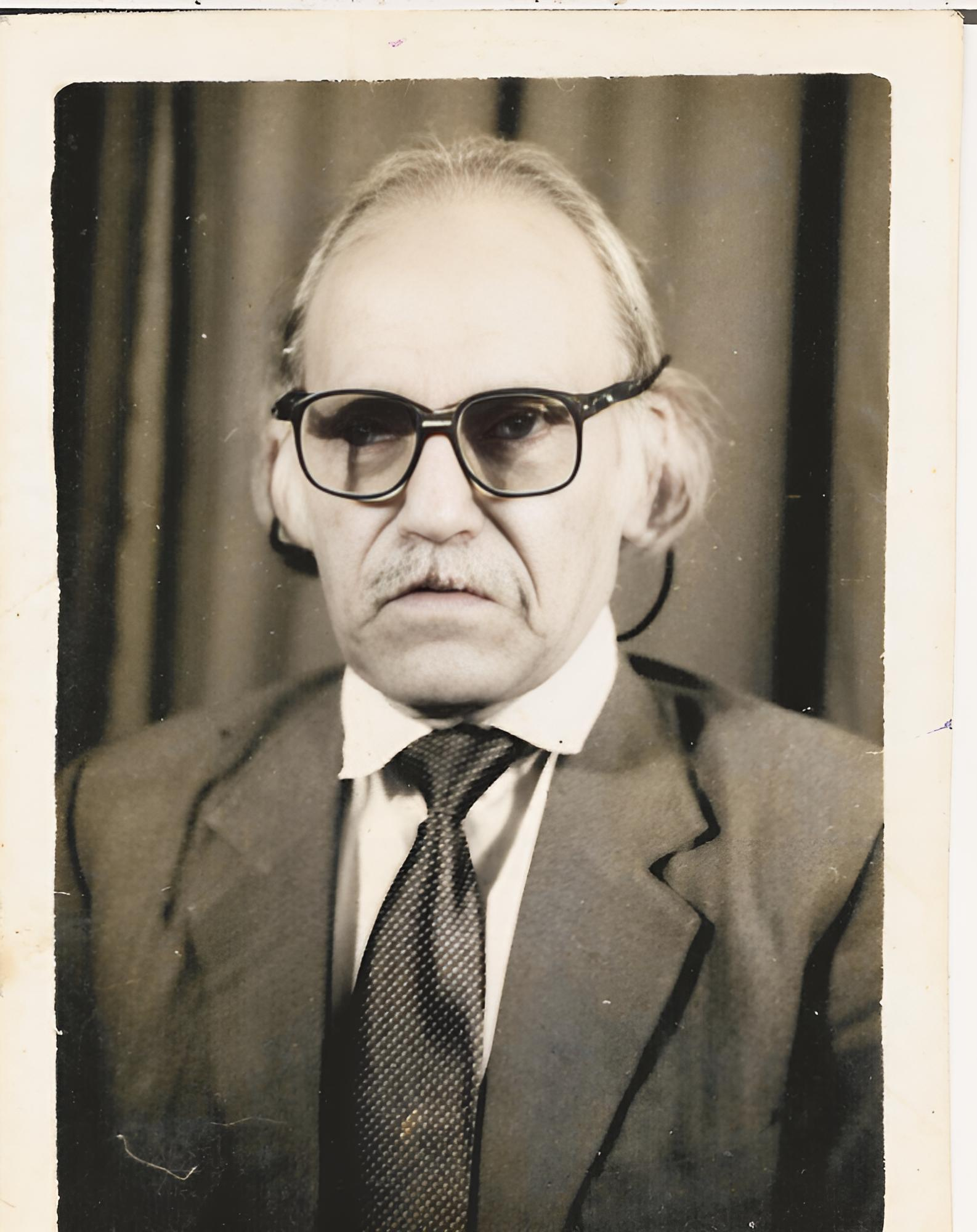
- Abid Raza Bedar

Abid Raza Bedar (4 February 1936 - 28 March 2025) was an Indian writer, librarian and scholar. He served as the Founding Director of Khuda Baksh Oriental Public Library, Patna from 1972 to 1996.

== Early life and education ==
Abid Raza Bedar was born as Abid Raza Khan on 4 February 1936 in Rampur district, in Uttar Pradesh, into a rich family of Hamid Raza Khan, and Ahmadi Begum as their eldest son.

He graduated from Aligarh Muslim University and had knowledge of Arabic, Urdu and Persian languages.

== Career ==
Abid Raza Khan adopted Bedar as his takhallus and became known as Abid Raza Bedar. He started serving Khuda Baksh Oriental Public Library, Patna as Director in 1972 and became popular as the one who gave Urdu research a new dimension. He had been in controversies due to the collection of books and manuscripts. He had earlier worked in Raza Library, Rampur and Indian Institute of International Studies, New Delhi.

== Scholarly works ==
- Kashmeer Darpan: Ek Tarruf, 2021
- Abdul Hamid tabib nahi hakeem, 2011
- Jamal al-din al-Afghani: a bibliography study, 1961
- Adeeb, 1988
- Aligarh Ki Muslim University Ka Masala, 1970
- Ghalibiyat-e-Nau, 1970
- Arabi Islami Madaris Ka Nisab-o-Nizam-e-Taleem Aur Asari Taqaze, 1969
- Ghalib Ki Azmat, 1969
- Abid Raza Bedar Intikhab-e-Kalam, 1969
- Azeem Aur La Zawal, 1968
- Maulana Abul Kalam Azad, 1968
- Nasr Ka Husn, 1968
- Raza Library, 1966
- Qaim Chandpuri, 1963
- Adab Ki Raftar, 1959

== Controversies ==
Amarat-e-Shariat, Idarah Shariah and Imarat Ahadis, all Islamic fatwa issuing body working in Bihar had issued a Fatwa of Apostasy against Bedar due to his book Seema Ki Talash and his ideas for not calling Hindus as Kafir and opposition of Cow-slaughter.

== Personal life ==
Bedar married Moazziz begum in 1963 they have two children together including Shaista Bedar.

== Death ==
Bedar died on 28 March 2025 in Aligarh at the age of 92.
