= Abdul Rashid Shaheen =

Indian politician

Member of Parliament, Lok Sabha
- In office 1999–2009
- Preceded by: Saifuddin Soz
- Succeeded by: Sharifuddin Shariq
- Constituency: Baramulla

Personal details
- Born: 3 August 1945 (age 80) Baramulla, Jammu and Kashmir
- Party: JKNC
- Spouse: Shameema akhter
- Children: 3 sons and 1 daughter
- As of 16 September, 2006

Abdul Rashid Shaheen (born August 3, 1945) is an active politician, socialist and a philanthropist. He has served as minister for industries back is 1980s and member of parliament two times from baramulla constituency in 1990s. He was a member of the 14th Lok Sabha of India. He used to represent the Baramulla (Lok Sabha constituency)constituency of Jammu and Kashmir and was a member of the Jammu and Kashmir National Conference (JKNC) political party.
