= Ahmad Izzat Pasha al-Abid =

Syrian politician

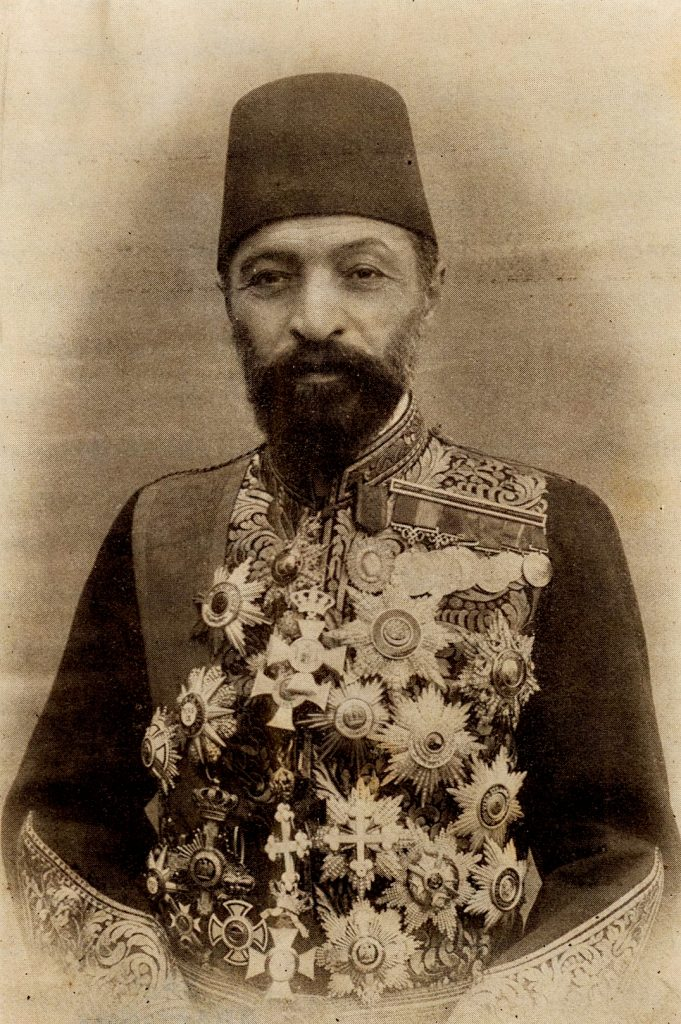

Second Secretary of the Imperial Palace
- In office 1895–1908
- Monarch: Abdul Hamid II

Personal details
- Born: Ahmad Izzat bin Hawlu al-Abid; 1851 Damascus, Ottoman Empire
- Died: 1924 (aged 72–73) Cairo, Kingdom of Egypt

Ahmad Izzat Pasha bin Hawlu Pasha al-Abid (Arabic: أحمد عزت باشا بن هولو باشا العابد, romanized: Aḥmad ʻIzzat Bāshā bin Hawlū Bāshā al-ʻĀbid; Turkish: Holo (Note: Holo (instead of Hevlu) is a transcription of the Syrian pronunciation of the name هولو (Hawlū).) Paşa'nın oğlu Ahmed İzzet Paşa el-Abid or Abidzade Ahmed İzzet Paşa; 1851–1924), nicknamed Izzat Pasha the Arab (Turkish: Arap İzzet Paşa), was a Syrian entrepreneur who became Second Secretary and confidant of Ottoman Sultan Abdulhamid II. He is considered to have been "one of the most powerful" statesmen during the last decade of Abdulhamid's rule.

== Life ==
Ahmad Izzat al-Abid was born in Damascus. His father was Hawlu Pasha al-Abid. Ahmad Izzat was educated in Beirut. He spoke Arabic, French and Turkish. He moved to Istanbul where he served the Ottoman sultan, Abdulhamid II as an adviser. He left the Ottoman Empire following the Young Turk Revolution in 1908 and moved to London for some time before living in France and Switzerland. He then left for Egypt, where he died in 1924.

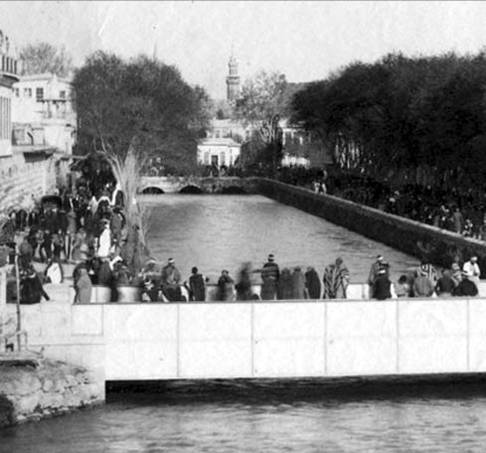
The Victoria Bridge and Hotel over the Barada in the 1870s

Abid accumulated great wealth during his life. He was also a businessman and owned numerous enterprises or buildings including the largest tourist hotel in Syria at the time, the Victoria Hotel in Damascus.

He was the father of Muhammad Ali Bay al-Abid, who served as the first president of the mandatory Syrian Republic.

== Bibliography ==
- Commins, David Dean (2004). "Abid, Ahmad Izzat al- (1851–1924)". Historical Dictionary of Syria (2nd ed.). Scarecrow Press. pp. 21–22. ISBN 9780810849341.
