= Sadiq Ali =

Indian politician

Hassanabad
- Constituency: Ex-MLA Zadibal Srinagar

Personal details
- Born: 2 May 1952 Hassanabad, Srinagar, Kashmir
- Died: 18 April 2011 (aged 58)
- Party: Jammu and Kashmir National Conference
- As of 5 March, 2007 Source: [Who's Who J&K State Assembly 1999 Pg.24]

Sadiq Ali (2 May 1952 – 18 April 2011) was a senior politician of Kashmir, India, a noted poet and writer and an active environmentalist. He was an elected legislator in the Kashmir State Assembly for three consecutive terms. Mr Sadiq Ali was born in Srinagar into an influential business family. His father, the late Mr. Jaffer Ali was a Paper mache artist and businessman.

Sadiq Ali graduated from Aligarh Muslim University and earned his MA in Political Science. He has given some important recommendations about the solution of the Kashmir conflict between India and Pakistan. His self-rule report has been widely applauded in both India and Pakistan and his recommendations have been regarded as one of the most workable solutions of this issue. He has also written a comprehensive paper on the deteriorating conditions of the forests of Jammu and Kashmir State; he has further submitted an indepth research paper outlining how the Dal Lake may be saved from further degradation.

Mr Sadiq Ali entered politics at a very young age, and was one of the closest associates of Sheikh Abdullah, the founder of National Conference. He was nominated to the State Legislative Council numerous times. He also held the position of treasurer of the JKNC for 23 years.

He quit National Conference stating personal reasons, although he never spoke against the NC party or its principles. There was widespread speculation that the only reason Mr Sadiq Ali quit NC was because of the NC leadership's inadequate action against a rival from within NC, whom Mr Sadiq had accused of sabotaging his re-election bid from Zadibal.

On 9 March 2008, Farooq Abdullah, the patron of NC, announced to the media that Mr Sadiq Ali had rejoined the party and would be handling the state affairs of the party.
